= Gotham season 2 =

Gotham
- Season 2
- Home media cover art
- Starring: Ben McKenzie; Donal Logue; David Mazouz; Morena Baccarin; Zabryna Guevara; Sean Pertwee; Robin Lord Taylor; Erin Richards; Camren Bicondova; Cory Michael Smith; James Frain; Jessica Lucas; Chris Chalk; Drew Powell; Nicholas D'Agosto; Michael Chiklis; Cameron Monaghan
- No. of episodes: 22

Release
- Original network: Fox
- Original release: September 21, 2015 – May 23, 2016

Season chronology
- ← Previous; Season 1 Next → Season 3

The second season of the American television series Gotham, based on characters from DC Comics related to the Batman franchise, revolves around the characters of James "Jim" Gordon and Bruce Wayne. The season is produced by Primrose Hill Productions, DC Entertainment, and Warner Bros. Television, with Bruno Heller, Danny Cannon, John Stephens, and Ken Woodruff serving as executive producers.

The season was ordered in January 2015 and every cast member from the last season returned with the exception of Victoria Cartagena as Renee Montoya (who would later return for the third season of Batwoman); Andrew Stewart-Jones as Crispus Allen; John Doman as Carmine Falcone; and Jada Pinkett Smith as Fish Mooney, although both Doman and Pinkett Smith returned as guest stars. New additions to the cast include James Frain as Theo Galavan; Jessica Lucas as Tabitha Galavan; and Michael Chiklis as Captain Nathaniel Barnes. Also, Morena Baccarin, Chris Chalk, Drew Powell, and Nicholas D'Agosto were upped to series regulars after having recurred on the previous season. The season was broadcast over 2 runs: the first 11 episodes aired from September to November 2015; and the other 11 episodes aired from February to May 2016. The season also holds two subtitles. The first half of the season is subtitled Rise of the Villains while the second half is subtitled Wrath of the Villains. The season premiered on September 21, 2015, and concluded on May 23, 2016, on Fox.

== Premise ==
Gotham has taken a major turn, with Penguin being the sole crime boss and commissioner Loeb being forced to retire. However, things start going haywire with the arrival of the Galavan family in Gotham; they seek revenge against the Wayne family over one of their ancestors being disgraced.

In the second half, Professor Hugo Strange has begun experimenting with resurrecting the dead and giving them unnatural abilities.

== Cast and characters ==
=== Main ===
- Ben McKenzie as James "Jim" Gordon
- Donal Logue as Harvey Bullock
- David Mazouz as Bruce Wayne
- Morena Baccarin as Leslie "Lee" Thompkins
- Zabryna Guevara as Sarah Essen
- Sean Pertwee as Alfred Pennyworth
- Robin Lord Taylor as Oswald Cobblepot / Penguin
- Erin Richards as Barbara Kean
- Camren Bicondova as Selina "Cat" Kyle
- Cory Michael Smith as Edward Nygma
- James Frain as Theo Galavan / Azrael
- Jessica Lucas as Tabitha Galavan
- Chris Chalk as Lucius Fox
- Drew Powell as Butch Gilzean
- Nicholas D'Agosto as Harvey Dent
- Michael Chiklis as Nathaniel Barnes

=== Recurring ===
- Tonya Pinkins as Ethel Peabody
- B. D. Wong as Hugo Strange
- Ian Quinlan as Carl Pinkney
- Natalie Alyn Lind as Silver St. Cloud
- Melinda Clarke as Grace Van Dahl
- Chelsea Spack as Kristin Kringle
- Michelle Veintimilla as Bridgit Pike / Firefly
- Ron Rifkin as Father Creel
- Nathan Darrow as Victor Fries / Mr. Freeze
- Cameron Monaghan as Jerome Valeska
- Stink Fisher as Aaron Helzinger
- Carol Kane as Gertrude Kapelnut
- Anthony Carrigan as Victor Zsasz
- Richard Kind as Mayor Aubrey James
- Clare Foley as Poison Ivy

=== Notable guests ===
- Peter Scolari as Gillian B. Loeb
- Todd Stashwick as Richard Sionis
- James Andrew O'Connor as Tommy Bones
- Maria Thayer as Scottie Mullen
- Mark Margolis as Paul Cicero
- Michael Potts as Sid Bunderslaw
- Raúl Castillo as Eduardo Flamingo
- Michelle Gomez as The Lady
- Tommy Flanagan as Tom "The Knife"
- Kristen Hager as Nora Fries
- Lori Petty as Jeri
- Michael Bowen as Patrick "Matches" Malone
- Paul Reubens as Elijah Van Dahl
- John Doman as Carmine Falcone
- Ned Bellamy as Warden Carlson Grey
- Jada Pinkett Smith as Fish Mooney
- Brian McManamon as Basil Karlo

== Episodes ==
No. overall	No. in season	Title	Directed by	Written by	Original release date	Prod. code	U.S. viewers (millions)
Rise of the Villains
23	1	"Damned If You Do..."	Danny Cannon	Bruno Heller	September 21, 2015	4X6201	4.57
Gordon is fired and Bullock resigns from the police. Gordon works with Cobblepot, now a crime boss, to force Commissioner Loeb to reinstate Gordon as a detective and resign as police commissioner in exchange for Gordon collecting a debt from someone and regretfully killing them to protect himself. Meanwhile, several inmates of Arkham Asylum including Barbara Kean, Aaron Helzinger, Jerome Valeska, Arnold Dobkins, Richard Sionis and Robert Greenwood are broken out of the asylum by Theo Galavan (James Frain) and his sister/enforcer, Tabitha Galavan (Jessica Lucas). All but Sionis agree to join forces with Galavan; Sionis is strangled and stabbed to death for his refusal. Bruce and Alfred discover a secret room at the end of the staircase.
24	2	"Knock, Knock"	Rob Bailey	Ken Woodruff	September 28, 2015	4X6202	4.65
Bruce fires Alfred when the latter interferes with his exploring his father's computer, but changes his mind when Alfred agrees to physically train him so he can confront his parents' killer. Galavan kidnaps the mayor and his group of "Maniax" begins a public murder spree for the sake of publicity. The Maniax attack GCPD and kill several police officers, including Essen; Nygma is wounded saving Miss Kringle during the massacre. Following this, Bullock rejoins the force to stop the Maniax.
25	3	"The Last Laugh"	Eagle Egilsson	John Stephens	October 5, 2015	4X6203	4.33
Gordon and Bullock search for Jerome, but discover Paul Cicero (Jerome's father) already murdered, Galavan reveals that his family built Gotham and he is seeking revenge on those who tarnished his family name. Galavan attends a charity event that Alfred, Bruce, and Leslie Thompkins also attend, which turns out to be an elaborate ruse wherein Galavan kills Jerome and is perceived to be a hero; he announces his candidacy for mayor. Several Gotham citizens see Jerome's actions on television and begin having mental breakdowns.
26	4	"Strike Force"	TJ Scott	Danny Cannon	October 12, 2015	4X6204	4.17
Nathaniel Barnes (Michael Chiklis), a new captain of the GCPD, arrives to clean up the department and end corruption. With Gordon's assistance, they recruit several aspiring police trainees from the Police Academy to form an elite team to accomplish that goal. Galavan kidnaps Cobblepot's mother and blackmails Cobblepot into murdering all of the other candidates so that Galavan can run for mayor unopposed. When Selina begins looking for Bruce at his prep school, she is ordered off by Alfred because she killed Reggie. Shortly afterward, Bruce meets with Galavan to thank him for saving his life during the charity event and meets Galavan's niece, Silver St. Cloud (Natalie Alyn Lind). Nygma and Miss Kringle have a romantic evening together. As Cobblepot begins to have Butch quietly search for his mother, Captain Barnes directs the strike force to target Cobblepot.
27	5	"Scarification"	Bill Eagles	Jordan Harper	October 19, 2015	4X6205	4.19
Cobblepot and Butch bring a chest to Galavan in his penthouse, revealing a kidnapped Sid Bunderslaw, where Tabitha removes one of his eyes. Meanwhile, the GCPD Strike Force, led by Captain Barnes and Gordon busts one of Cobblepot's money laundering houses, where they're nearly killed by a man with a rocket-propelled grenade. Galavan arrives at the GCPD, where he offers help in cleaning the GCPD's corruption in exchange for support for his candidacy. Gordon gently refuses, claiming the police and politics don't match. Tabitha visits Cobblepot to discuss their next move, which requires hiring arsonists. Gordon and Bullock ambush Bridgit on a would-be robbery, where their brothers abandon her. While she tries to back off, officer Luke Garrett (Lenny Platt) tries to restrain her, but she accidentally burns him down. She escapes with Selina but Officer Garrett later dies from the fire. Galavan again visits the GCPD, where Gordon decides to support his candidacy. In his penthouse, Galavan is visited by Father Creel (Ron Rifkin), who hands him the knife, claiming his warriors are on the way, and Bruce Wayne will die.
28	6	"By Fire"	TJ Scott	Rebecca Perry Cutter	October 26, 2015	4X6206	4.32
After moving away from the Pike brothers and in with Selina, Bridgit Pike is abducted and further abused by the Pike Brothers after attempting to leave Gotham City. Bridgit snaps and murders the other Pike Brothers, beginning a crime spree. After a visit to Selina's hideout, Gordon and Bullock arrive at the Pike Brothers' apartment where they find them dead. Theo Galavan continues to lure Bruce Wayne, this time offering to help clean up the corruption at Wayne Enterprises. Butch discovers the location of Cobblepot's mother and Cobblepot begins to rally a rescue party. Bridgit Pike is incapacitated in a struggle with the GCPD strike force and publicly announced to be dead much to the dismay of Selina. Kristen Kringle learns that Nygma murdered Officer Dougherty. In an attempt to keep Kringle from telling anyone, Nygma accidentally strangles her, killing her. Meanwhile, Pike is alive but her entire body is burned. She is taken to Indian Hill, an underground division of Wayne Enterprises where inhumane experiments are secretly performed. It is stated that her suit had melted onto her, rendering her fireproof.
29	7	"Mommy's Little Monster"	Kenneth Fink	Robert Hull	November 2, 2015	4X6207	4.27
Butch leads Cobblepot to his mother's location, where Theo and Tabitha Galavan are waiting. Now cured of his programming, Butch betrays Cobblepot and Tabitha. Galavan murders his mother, and Cobblepot escapes, vowing to kill Theo in revenge. Galavan, now elected mayor, convinces the GCPD and the public that Cobblepot assaulted him. He also has Harvey Dent obtain a warrant for Cobblepot's arrest. Gordon begins to suspect that Galavan is framing Cobblepot and tracks down Butch. In an interrogation, Butch reveals that Theo has been blackmailing Cobblepot and that he murdered Cobblepot's mother. Later that night, Theo attends his victory celebration at which the GCPD are secretly stationed, ready to capture Cobblepot if he arrives. Cobblepot shows up with his henchmen show up and is ambushed by Gordon. Theo attempts to convince Gordon to shoot Cobblepot, who escapes. Gordon informs Theo that he is determined to expose his corruption. Elsewhere, Tabitha murders a member of the GCPD strike force. Following the death of Kristen Kringle, Nygma's mental state worsens as his split personality attempts to convince him that he enjoys getting away with murder. Both of Nygma's personalities then merge.
30	8	"Tonight's the Night"	Jeffrey Hunt	Jim Barnes	November 9, 2015	4X6208	4.11
Theo Galavan gives Barbara permission to kill Gordon and also offers Bruce a proposition: Bruce sells his controlling position in Wayne Enterprises to Theo and, in return, Theo gives Bruce the information about his parents' killer and the culprits responsible. Barbara walks inside the GCPD and Gordon suggests he risk himself to find more information about Galavan. While en route to an unknown location on Barbara's instructions, the squad car is assaulted by Tabitha and her crew. Gordon wakes up in Gotham Cathedral, where he and Barbara were going to have their wedding before their break-up. The Strike Force discovers Gordon's location, thanks to the help of Bullock. While the Strike Force engages Tabitha's crew and rescues Leslie (who was somehow kidnapped by Tabitha), Gordon briefly fights Barbara, leading to Barbara hanging outside the church and falling, resulting in severe injuries. Following information obtained by Barbara, GCPD rescued Aubrey James from his abduction. Bruce declines Theo's proposition just as Gordon arrives and arrests Theo, who destroys the evidence on the Waynes' killer. Meanwhile, while trying to bury Kristen Kringle, Nygma discovers an injured and exhausted Penguin, who asks Nygma for help.
31	9	"A Bitter Pill to Swallow"	Louis Shaw Milito	Megan Mostyn-Brown	November 16, 2015	4X6209	4.35
Tabitha goes to an underground killer agency and pays to have James Gordon assassinated. Bruce tries to get information about his parents' killer from Silver but is stopped by Alfred, who orders Silver to stay away from Bruce. When Bruce tries to sneak out, he is stopped by Selina, who claims she has evidence that Silver is not who she claims to be. Gordon and Barnes investigate Theo's condo for evidence. The killers arrive; Gordon and Barnes manage to fend them off, but Barnes is severely injured. Police reinforcements arrive, but are eliminated by another hired killer named Eduardo Flamingo (Raúl Castillo). After coming close to killing him, Gordon arrests Flamingo, but, before being placed in his cell, Flamingo kills another officer. Meanwhile, Nygma persuades Cobblepot to move on from the death of his mother and the both of them kill one of Theo's kidnapped henchmen in celebration. The Order of Saint Dumas arrives in Gotham City.
32	10	"The Son of Gotham"	Rob Bailey	John Stephens	November 23, 2015	4X6210	4.00
Bruce and Silver are kidnapped by Tom "The Knife" (Tommy Flanagan). He manipulates Silver into seemingly revealing the name of Bruce's parents' killer after being paid by Bruce and Selina. She says that the killer's name is "M. Malone" but later claims that she lied. Galavan is released after Mayor James lies, stating that Galavan did not kidnap him, framing Penguin instead. Gordon is captured by Theo, who reveals the history of his family to Gordon, but Gordon is rescued by Cobblepot and Gabe. Alfred grows suspicious of Bruce's whereabouts and searches Theo's residence, where he is wounded in a fight with Tabitha, which he narrowly escapes. When Leslie notices Kristen Kringle's absence, Nygma is forced to lie to her, claiming that Kringle left town with Officer Dougherty. Theo breaks into Wayne Manor and kidnaps Bruce, as part of the Order of St. Dumas' plan to "cleanse" Gotham.
33	11	"Worse Than a Crime"	Jeffrey Hunt	Bruno Heller	November 30, 2015	4X6211	4.51
Gordon wakes up in Nygma's house only to learn from Cobblepot that he is now a fugitive from the law for assaulting Theo Galavan. Gordon and Cobblepot begin making plans to break into Theo's residence and save Bruce. After finding Gordon, Leslie attempts to persuade him to turn himself to the GCPD by informing him that she is pregnant. Gordon, Bullock, Alfred, Selina, Cobblepot, and his gang all arrive at Galavan's residence just as the Order of Saint Dumas is about to kill Bruce. During a clash between the Order and Cobblepot's gang in which the Order is defeated, Theo, Tabitha, and Silver St. Cloud begin to make their escape. Tabitha and Silver escape but leave Theo behind. Cobblepot convinces Gordon that Theo might never be convicted and the two take Theo to the docks and murder him. Later, Gordon finds Leslie and proposes to her. Theo's body is discovered by Wayne Enterprises, who take the corpse to Indian Hill where Fish Mooney's body also is being kept. The scientists state that Theo's body is to be experimented on by Professor Hugo Strange.
Wrath of the Villains
34	12	"Mr. Freeze"	Nick Copus	Ken Woodruff	February 29, 2016	4X6212	4.12
Several weeks following the death of Theo Galavan, Gordon is called in for questioning and Cobblepot is arrested. Gordon and Cobblepot lie to the police, stating that Cobblepot murdered Galavan and Gordon was not involved. Gordon is reinstated into the GCPD, while Cobblepot falsely justifies his actions as the result of mental illness. Cobblepot is sent to Arkham Asylum, where he becomes a patient of Hugo Strange (B. D. Wong), the Chief of Psychiatry. Butch takes over Cobblepot's criminal empire. Gordon and Bullock begin investigating a kidnapping and murder spree, unaware that a scientist named Victor Fries (Nathan Darrow) is the culprit. Fries has been experimenting with freezing and re-animating humans so that he can freeze his terminally ill wife Nora (Kristen Hager) until he can find a cure for her disease. When the police target Fries as a suspect, they discover his laboratory while he's away and arrest his wife. After learning of the arrest, Victor Fries attempts to turn himself in before finally discovering which of his serums can successfully reanimate a human being. Professor Strange learns of the experiments and begins making plans to recruit Fries for Indian Hill.
35	13	"A Dead Man Feels No Cold"	Eagle Egilsson	Seth Boston	March 7, 2016	4X6213	4.54
At Arkham Asylum, Professor Strange begins overseeing intensive treatments meant to reduce Oswald Cobblepot's aggressive tendencies. Upon learning that Nora is being sent to the medical wing at Arkham Asylum, Victor Fries builds an armored suit. Fries arrives at the asylum and, after fighting through security and the police, manages to escape with Nora. Elsewhere, Bruce researches a lead, believing he has discovered that the man who killed his parents is Patrick "Matches" Malone. James Gordon deduces that Victor Fries will return to his home laboratory to freeze Nora and the police surround Fries' home to find that Gordon is correct. In the laboratory, Nora blames herself for the deaths that Fries has caused. Fries attempts to cryogenically freeze her, only to learn that Nora switched the formulas when he was not looking. Nora dies as a result. Distraught by Nora's death, Fries attempts to commit suicide by freezing himself and is publicly pronounced dead despite surviving the process. Fries wakes up in Indian Hill to discover that he can no longer survive outside of subzero temperatures. Fries meets Professor Strange, who offers him an alliance as a fellow scientist.
36	14	"This Ball of Mud and Meanness"	John Behring	Jordan Harper	March 14, 2016	4X6214	4.01
Bruce receives a gun from Selina and goes on the hunt for Patrick Malone with Alfred. To get the information, Alfred is forced to fight in an underground fight club, landing Alfred in the hospital. After Bruce goes on the hunt himself, Alfred contacts Gordon and Bullock so that they can save Bruce from potentially being killed. Bruce locates Malone, who later seemingly confirms he is responsible for the murder of Bruce's parents. He asks Bruce to kill him, but Bruce holds back at the last moment and leaves the gun behind, leading to Malone committing suicide. Later, in the cave, Alfred reads Bruce's letter about him moving to the streets with Selina to learn how to fight crime. Meanwhile, Leslie asks Gordon to investigate Kristen Kringle's sudden disappearance. When Nygma is informed, he swears under his breath that he will outsmart Gordon. After running a few more tests on Cobblepot, Hugo Strange declares him sane and releases him from Arkham, all the while stating that he still has plans for him.
37	15	"Mad Grey Dawn"	Nick Copus	Robert Hull	March 21, 2016	4X6215	3.89
Upon being released from Arkham Asylum when his violent nature is cured, Cobblepot visits the grave of his deceased mother. There, he crosses paths with Elijah Van Dahl (Paul Reubens). After informing Dahl that he is the son of Gertrude Kapelput, Dahl reveals that he is Cobblepot's father. Dahl had an affair with Gertrude for decades in the past, but the two were separated by Dahl's disapproving family. Dahl welcomes Cobblepot into his family. Paranoid that Gordon suspects him of killing Kristen Kringle, Nygma disguises himself and begins a series of crimes that involve brain teasers. As Gordon begins solving these crimes, Nygma kills a member of the GCPD strike force, informs the GCPD that Gordon killed Galavan while pretending to be said officer, and frames Gordon for the murder. Believing Gordon murdered the officer to keep him from testifying, the GCPD arrests Gordon. After a trial, Gordon is found guilty and sentenced to Blackgate Penitentiary. Selina teaches Bruce how to survive on the streets as they steal money from Butch's nephew, with Bruce taking a massive beating from the nephew in the process. Barbara wakes from her catatonic state in Arkham Asylum.
38	16	"Prisoners"	Scott White	Danny Cannon	March 28, 2016	4X6216	3.82
Gordon is adjusting to life in Blackgate Penitentiary. Warden Carlson Grey (Ned Bellamy) announces that Gordon will be transferred to the gen-pop quarter dubbed "the World's End," part of Grey's plan to kill Gordon. He is constantly aided by guard Wilson Bishop (Marc Damon Johnson). Bullock tells Gordon that Lee has lost their baby and left town. Later, Gordon is defended from attackers by convict Peter "Puck" Davies (Peter Mark Kendall), who is beaten and sent to the infirmary. In an attempt to save Gordon, Bullock meets with Falcone. Gordon's death is staged, and he and Puck escape. Puck dies from his injuries, while Gordon is given a safe house so he can clear his name and find Lee. Meanwhile, Cobblepot reveals his criminal past to Dahl, who forgives him. Dahl is told by the doctor that his heart defect is infected and that he has little time to live. Upset that Cobblepot may receive what they perceive to be "their" inheritance, Dahl's wife Grace and her children Sasha and Charles poison a drink for Cobblepot to ingest. However, Dahl drinks from the bottle and dies, after stating to Cobblepot his intentions of changing his will in favor of him.
39	17	"Into the Woods"	Oz Scott	Rebecca Perry Cutter	April 11, 2016	4X6217	3.71
James Gordon continues to flee the law as he tries to clear his name. When Gordon secretly approaches Nygma for help, he deduces that Nygma framed him. Nygma electrocutes Gordon into unconsciousness, but Gordon awakes just as Nygma is preparing to stuff him in a car trunk. Gordon asks Selina to report to the GCPD. Gordon follows Nygma into the woods, from where he intends to relocate Kristen Kringle's body. Nygma admits that he framed Gordon as the GCPD eavesdrops on the conversation. They arrest Nygma before he can kill Gordon. Nygma is placed in Arkham Asylum. Nathaniel Barnes offers Gordon his job back, but Gordon declines as he has other matters with which to deal. Barbara is released from Arkham Asylum after she stops showing any signs of mental illness. Following the death of his father, Cobblepot is bullied by his step-family. However, when he discovers evidence that they killed his father, his former self returns and he murders his step-family.
40	18	"Pinewood"	John Stephens	Robert Hull & Megan Mostyn-Brown	April 18, 2016	4X6218	3.72
Bruce, Lucius, and Alfred search through the secret files on Thomas Wayne's newly fixed computer to find a clue as to who killed him and Martha and why. Barbara tracks down Gordon. Claiming to be cured of her insanity, she tries to reconcile with Gordon, but to no avail. With Barbara's unorthodox assistance, Gordon discovers that the person who contracted Patrick Malone to kill Thomas and Martha Wayne is known as "the Philosopher." Bruce and Alfred track a lead from Thomas Wayne's computer and find Karen Jennings, a former Blackgate inmate on whom experiments were performed at Pinewood Farms, a Wayne Enterprises facility, by the Philosopher. She offers to identify the Philosopher, but Victor Fries is sent to kill her. Following Jennings' death, Lucius does further research and discovers that Hugo Strange is the Philosopher. After many failed attempts, Strange finally succeeds in resurrecting someone from the dead: Theo Galavan.
41	19	"Azrael"	Larysa Kondracki	Jim Barnes & Ken Woodruff	May 2, 2016	4X6219	3.59
Gordon questions Professor Strange about Project Chimera, which later makes Strange send Theo Galavan, now under the name Azrael, to take out Gordon. While at Arkham Asylum, Gordon bumps into Nygma in the playroom. Nygma later overhears Strange and Peabody complaining about Gordon's interference. Nygma suggests that he can help them take out Gordon, but Strange refuses his help. Bruce is told by Bullock and Gordon that there isn't enough evidence to imprison Hugo Strange. Azrael gets some memories back after looking at posters from Galavan's election. After, Gordon is in holding when the lights flicker and Azrael shows up, killing a few officers and making an unsuccessful attempt on Gordon's life. Barnes and Gordon flee to the roof, where Barnes fights Azrael with a pipe, breaks his sword, and rips off his mask, revealing Azrael's identity. In the end, Barnes is sent to the hospital and Gordon heads home, watched by Azrael from a distance.
42	20	"Unleashed"	Paul Edwards	Danny Cannon	May 9, 2016	4X6220	3.67
Together with Bullock and a crew of police officers, Gordon arrives at Arkham Asylum with a warrant to inspect Professor Strange's office. Strange is unfortunately one step in front of them, having shredded all of his documents. Nygma, in the meantime, is disturbed by what he saw at Indian Hill and realizes he needs to escape. As Captain Barnes is still in the hospital, Harvey Bullock becomes de facto captain. Bruce decides to go off with Selina to find a way into Arkham. Selina accepts because she wants to rescue Bridgit from Arkham, but insists she go in on her own. Gordon and Bullock arrive at Butch's mansion to talk with Tabitha, who states the sword Azrael used was fake and that the real one is located in her grandfather's tomb. They later arrive at Gotham cemetery, where they steal the sword. Azrael arrives, injuring Tabitha and escaping with the real sword. Gordon warns Alfred about Galavan just as Bruce returns to Wayne Manor. Gordon arrives and shoots Azrael multiple times, but he remains undefeated until Cobblepot and Butch arrive. Butch fires an RPG, killing Azrael.
43	21	"A Legion of Horribles"	Rob Bailey	Jordan Harper	May 16, 2016	4X6221	3.84
Selina begs to be Bridgit's servant, making use of Bridgit's alter-ego. Bruce is troubled after Selina fails to meet with him and learns of her capture. Meanwhile, Strange's project continues and he successfully resurrects Fish Mooney – the first subject to retain full memory. Bruce believes that there is a secret room in Arkham where Strange is experimenting on the dead and that the only way to be certain is if they head in themselves. Bruce, Gordon, and Fox visit Arkham to execute their plan, but their motives are revealed and all three are captured. Bruce and Fox are put in a chamber and interrogated by Nygma on Strange's behalf. Meanwhile, Gordon is brought into another room with Strange and introduced to Basil, a patient whose skin stretches more than humanly possible. Strange places him in a machine and replicates Gordon's visage onto Basil's face.
44	22	"Transference"	Eagle Egilsson	Bruno Heller	May 23, 2016	4X6222	3.62
Disguised as Gordon, Basil pulls the GCPD off of Arkham; however, Barbara later exposes Basil as an impostor. Strange prepares to detonate a bomb beneath Arkham and tells Ms. Peabody to transfer the patients to another facility. Mooney gains control of Peabody, but Strange starts the bomb's countdown under the White-Haired Lady's orders. With Nygma's help, Gordon and Lucius stop the bomb. Mooney escapes in a bus with Strange's other monsters, and encounters a shocked Penguin on the street after the latter and Butch's gang ambush the bus thinking Strange is on board; she knocks him out, prompting Butch and his gang to flee. Strange is arrested, Gordon leaves to find Lee, Bruce tells Alfred of his plans to find the secret council that wants him dead, and Bullock is trusted to protect Gotham. A homeless woman opens the abandoned bus, unwittingly releasing the monsters upon Gotham; among them is a boy identical to Bruce.

== Production ==
The show was officially renewed by Fox for a 22-episode second season on January 17, 2015.

For this season, the producers decided not to follow the "case-of-the-week" format of most episodes in the first season.

The season saw all series regulars from season 1 returning with the exception of Victoria Cartagena, and Andrew Stewart-Jones. John Doman and Jada Pinkett Smith, who were regulars on season 1, returned to the show in guest star positions. In June 2015, James Frain joined the series as billionaire industrialist Theo Galavan and Jessica Lucas was cast as Tabitha Galavan. Michael Chiklis then joined in July 2015 in the role of Captain Nathaniel Barnes, the GCPD's new captain and Gordon's ally who will one day become his enemy. The show also upgraded Morena Baccarin, Chris Chalk, Drew Powell and Nicholas D'Agosto from recurring or guest roles to series regulars.

The total cost of production for the second season of Gotham was $111 million.

== Reception ==
=== Ratings ===
Viewership and ratings per episode of Gotham season 2
No.	Title	Air date	Rating/share (18–49)	Viewers (millions)	DVR (18–49)	DVR viewers (millions)	Total (18–49)	Total viewers (millions)
1	"Damned If You Do..."	September 21, 2015	1.6/5	4.57	1.2	2.92	2.8	7.49
2	"Knock, Knock"	September 28, 2015	1.6/5	4.65	1.3	2.90	2.9	7.54
3	"The Last Laugh"	October 5, 2015	1.5/5	4.33	1.2	2.78	2.7	7.11
4	"Strike Force"	October 12, 2015	1.5/5	4.17	1.3	2.64	2.8	6.81
5	"Scarification"	October 19, 2015	1.3/4	4.19	1.1	2.43	2.4	6.62
6	"By Fire"	October 26, 2015	1.5/5	4.32	1.1	2.43	2.6	6.76
7	"Mommy's Little Monster"	November 2, 2015	1.6/5	4.27	1.1	2.77	2.7	7.04
8	"Tonight's the Night"	November 9, 2015	1.5/4	4.11	1.2	2.70	2.7	6.81
9	"A Bitter Pill to Swallow"	November 16, 2015	1.5/5	4.35	1.1	2.46	2.6	6.79
10	"The Son of Gotham"	November 23, 2015	1.4/4	4.00	1.0	2.49	2.4	6.49
11	"Worse Than a Crime"	November 30, 2015	1.6/5	4.51	1.0	2.42	2.6	6.93
12	"Mr. Freeze"	February 29, 2016	1.5/5	4.12	1.0	2.44	2.5	6.57
13	"A Dead Man Feels No Cold"	March 7, 2016	1.5/5	4.54	1.0	2.23	2.5	6.77
14	"This Ball of Mud and Meanness"	March 14, 2016	1.3/4	4.01	1.0	2.31	2.3	6.32
15	"Mad Grey Dawn"	March 21, 2016	1.3/4	3.89	0.8	2.09	2.1	5.98
16	"Prisoners"	March 28, 2016	1.3/5	3.82	0.8	1.92	2.1	5.72
17	"Into the Woods"	April 11, 2016	1.2/4	3.71	0.9	2.07	2.1	5.78
18	"Pinewood"	April 18, 2016	1.2/4	3.72	0.9	2.16	2.1	5.88
19	"Azrael"	May 2, 2016	1.2/4	3.59	0.9	2.18	2.1	5.77
20	"Unleashed"	May 9, 2016	1.2/4	3.67	0.9	1.93	2.1	5.61
21	"A Legion of Horribles"	May 16, 2016	1.3/4	3.84	0.8	1.88	2.1	5.72
22	"Transference"	May 23, 2016	1.2/4	3.62	0.8	1.94	2.0	5.55

=== Critical reviews ===
The second season of Gotham received positive reviews from critics, generally being regarded as an improvement over the first season. On Rotten Tomatoes the season has a rating of 74% based on 15 reviews, with an average rating of 6.58/10. The site's critical consensus reads, "While still tonally uneven in season two, Gotham is back with a renewed focus, moving away from disjointed case-of-the-week plots into a darker, more stable serialized story." Metacritic gives the season a score of 62 out of 100, based on 6 critics, indicating "generally favorable" reviews.
