= Pinewood (Gotham) =

- Gotham episode
- Episode no.: Season 2 Episode 18
- Directed by: John Stephens
- Written by: Robert Hull; Megan Mostyn-Brown
- Production code: 4X6218
- Original air date: April 18, 2016
- Running time: 42 minutes

Guest appearances
- B. D. Wong as Dr. Hugo Strange; Tonya Pinkins as Ethel Peabody; Nathan Darrow as Victor Fries/Mr. Freeze; Michelle Gomez as The Lady; Julia Taylor Ross as Karen Jennings

Episode chronology
← Previous "Into the Woods"	Next → "Azrael"
- Gotham season 2

"Pinewood" is the eighteenth episode of the second season, and 40th episode overall from the Fox series Gotham. The episode was written by co-executive producer Robert Hull and Megan Mostyn-Brown and directed by executive producer John Stephens in his first Gotham episode directed. It was first broadcast on April 18, 2016. In the episode, Bruce and Alfred set to find out information about a program called Pinewood Farms which had something to do with Thomas Wayne's death and involvement while Gordon sets out to find The Lady and Dr. Strange continues his experiments.

The episode received positive reviews, with critics praising the character development, resolution of the Waynes' murderer and the plot twists.

== Plot ==
Gordon (Benjamin McKenzie) receives a visit from Barbara (Erin Richards). He holds her at gunpoint, demanding to know how she was let out of Arkham Asylum. Barbara states she's "sane" and regretful about killing her parents. Gordon dismisses her and kicks her out of his apartment where she runs into Bullock (Donal Logue). Gordon is currently investigating The Lady (Michelle Gomez) as the possible contractor of Matches Malone to kill the Waynes. He then brutally attacks many hitmen who serve her until one of them reveals she may be in a club called Artemis.

Gordon tries to enter the Artemis but is denied. Barbara arrives and offers to get inside so she can retrieve the information. While Barbara and The Lady bond, Gordon infiltrates the club until he's captured by Barbara. He's tied to a chair and taunted by Barbara and The Lady. The Lady reveals she sent Matches for an employer but the employer never revealed his real name except his alias, "the Philosopher". Barbara then tasers The Lady and she and Gordon escape. Barbara tries to get Gordon to claim she's sane but Gordon can't forgive her since she tried to kill Lee in the church.

Bruce (David Mazouz), Alfred (Sean Pertwee) and Lucius Fox (Chris Chalk) discover in the computer a meeting Bruce's father attended to meet a woman named Karen Jennings about something called Pinewood Farms. Bruce and Alfred arrive at a shack where they discover Karen (Julia Taylor Ross), who has claws from an experiment. She reveals that Pinewood is an engineering program from Wayne Enterprises. She was convicted of murder and sent to Blackgate after causing her father's death when board members appeared and offered to fix her crippled arm. Thomas Wayne soon found out about Pinewood, shut it down and hid everyone. While experimenting on someone dubbed "Patient 44", Professor Strange (B. D. Wong) is notified by Ethel Peabody (Tonya Pinkins) that someone is tracking the Pinewood Farms program.

Bruce, Alfred and Karen arrive at the Pinewood Farms facility but they're pursued by men sent by Strange. While escaping, Karen kills one of the men with her claw while Alfred shoots another. They're then arrested by the police. Gordon arrives at the GCPD where Bruce and Alfred are set free. Bruce reveals everything to Barnes (Michael Chiklis) but Karen is sent to Blackgate Penitentiary. They then plan on breaking her out. Professor Strange is notified of this and decides to release Victor Fries (Nathan Darrow) with a new suit and armor.

Gordon, Alfred and Bruce hijack the armored truck carrying Karen and bribe the driver to remain silent. In the truck, Karen reveals Thomas visited her frequently and that he was the one to start Pinewood Farms, before the Philosopher took over the command. Fries arrives and ambushes them. Karen decides to sacrifice herself and Fries freezes her and then shatters her corpse. Barbara is shown at the mansion of Tabitha (Jessica Lucas) and Butch (Drew Powell) where Tabitha decides to let her live with them.

Fox arrives at Wayne Manor and shows Bruce, Gordon and Alfred new information he discovered. He identified a photo of Thomas Wayne with many colleagues, including Hugo Strange, who is labelled as "the Philosopher". This leads Bruce to discover that Strange was the one to kill his father. In Arkham, Strange and Peabody are tuned in to an alarm which leads them to a risen Patient 44 brutally attacking the medical staff. He's revealed to be a resurrected Theo Galavan (James Frain), who yells the word "Azrael".

== Production ==
=== Development ===
The eighteenth episode of the season, "Pinewood", was written by Robert Hull and Megan Mostyn-Brown, with John Stephens directing.

=== Casting ===
The episode marked the first appearance of James Frain since his character's death in "Rise of the Villains: Worse Than a Crime", an absence of 7 episodes. Morena Baccarin, Robin Lord Taylor, Camren Bicondova, Cory Michael Smith, and Nicholas D'Agosto don't appear in the episode as their respective characters. The guest cast for the episode include B. D. Wong as Professor Hugo Strange, Tonya Pinkins as Ethel Peabody, Nathan Darrow as Victor Fries, Michelle Gomez as The Lady and Julia Chan as Karen Jennings.

== Reception ==
=== Viewers ===
The episode was watched by 3.72 million viewers with a 1.2/4 share among adults aged 18 to 49. This was a slight increase in viewership from the previous episode, which was watched by 3.71 million viewers. With this ratings, Gotham ranked second for FOX, finally being beaten by Lucifer, fourth on its timeslot and eight for the night on the 18-49 demographics, behind NCIS: Los Angeles, Lucifer, Blindspot, Supergirl, Scorpion, Dancing with the Stars, and The Voice.

It was also the 25th most watched of the week in the 18-49 demographics and the 55th most watched overall in the week. With Live+7 DVR viewing factored in, the episode had an overall rating of 5.88 million viewers, and a 2.1 in the 18–49 demographic.

=== Critical reviews ===
Professional ratings
Review scores
Source	Rating
Rotten Tomatoes (Tomatometer)	86%
Rotten Tomatoes (Average Score)	8.4
IGN	7.2
The A.V. Club	C+
TV Fanatic	4.5/5.0 stars
TV Overmind	4.0/5.0 stars
Den of Geek	4.0/5.0 stars

"Wrath of the Villains: Pinewood" received positive reviews from critics. The episode received a rating of 86% with an average score of 8.4 out of 10 on the review aggregator Rotten Tomatoes.

Matt Fowler of IGN gave the episode a "good" 7.2 out of 10 and wrote in his verdict, "'Pinewood' finally closed the door on the show's biggest mystery. After we waited patiently for Bruce to find Matches. And for him to then also now find Karen. And for Gordon to get answers from 'The Lady.' Though in the end, the unexpected resurrection of Theo Galavan trumped any and all reveals about Strange and Thomas Wayne."

The A.V. Club's Kyle Fowle gave the episode a "C+" grade and wrote, "'Wrath Of The Villains: Pinewood' is basically two completely different shows crammed into one. There's the first half of the episode, which sees Gotham embrace its more campy elements and mix them with its lighthearted gumshoe elements, creating something that's at least fascinating, a weird concoction that wouldn't be out of place in Hugo Strange's facility. Then there's the second half of the episode, when all the storylines dovetail into one, and things get silly and contrived. Balancing and mingling various tones has always been a struggle for Gotham. This season necessitates that balance more than ever, as the show looks to create drama out of the investigation into the Wayne murders while also indulging in the campy fun of Indian Hill — the villains still have to wrath, you know. Like so much of this season, 'Pinewood' can't quite pull off the balancing act."

Andy Behbakht of TV Overmind gave the series a star rating of 4.0 out of 5, writing "Overall, 'Pinewood' was a step-up and while we have to go through yet another one-week hiatus, the second half of this season has been a major improvement and will hopefully end just as strong with these final episodes."

Keertana Sastry of EW stated: "Slowly but surely, the plans for the end of Gotham second season are coming together, and boy are things getting mighty juicy. Tonight's episode, 'Wrath of the Villains: Pinewood' revealed quite a bit of new information about Thomas Wayne's secret activities to take down evil and corruption within his own corporation, as well as a final resurrection scene that many of us fans have wanted for months that goes hand-in-hand with the actual DC universe (how often does that happen anymore on this show?)."

Lisa Babick from TV Fanatic, gave a 4.0 star rating out of 5.0, stating: "There's a lot of crazy about to happen in Gotham, and Jim is right in the thick of it. The mystery of who killed Thomas and Martha Wayne was finally solved on Gotham Season 2 Episode 18, but it doesn't appear Jim and Bruce are going to find peace any time soon. I doubt Professor Strange is going to give up that easily." Kayti Burt from Den of Geek, gave a 4.0 star rating out of 5.0, stating: "What's this? Two consecutive episodes of Gotham that are not only cohesive, but totally compelling? Be still, my skeptical, TV-loving heart. Much like last week's 'Into the Woods,' 'Pinewood' manages to bring together the disparate parts of this show's plot in a logical way. While last week focused on the capture of Ed, this week focuses on (trying to) solve that darn Wayne murder case once and for all."
