= A Bitter Pill to Swallow =

- Gotham episode
- Episode no.: Season 2 Episode 9
- Directed by: Louis Shaw-Milito
- Written by: Megan Mostyn-Brown
- Production code: 4X6209
- Original air date: November 16, 2015

Guest appearances
- Natalie Alyn Lind as Silver St. Cloud; Raúl Castillo as Eduardo Flamingo; Michelle Gomez as The Lady; Jon Sklaroff as Billy Boy; Ron Rifkin as Father Creel; Ashlei Sharpe Chestnut as Officer Katherine Parks

Episode chronology
← Previous "Tonight's the Night"	Next → "The Son of Gotham"
- Gotham season 2

"A Bitter Pill to Swallow" is the ninth episode of the second season and 31st episode overall from the FOX series Gotham. The episode was written by Megan Mostyn-Brown and directed by Louis Shaw-Milito. It was first broadcast in November 16, 2015 in FOX. In this episode, Tabitha sends a group of hitmen to kill Gordon after Galavan's arrest. Gordon and Barnes investigate Galavan's penthouse for clues until they're ambushed by Tabitha's hitmen.

The episode was watched by 4.35 million viewers and received positive reviews, with critics praising Gordon's storyline and Penguin's and Nygma's dynamic chemistry but Bruce's storyline was criticized for no plot advancement.

== Plot ==
Tabitha (Jessica Lucas) arrives at a bar where she enters an underground illegal casino run by a woman known as The Lady (Michelle Gomez). Tabitha offers money in exchange for killing Gordon (Benjamin McKenzie) after the arrest of Galavan (James Frain). Gordon is notified in the hospital that Barbara (Erin Richards) will survive and be transferred to Arkham Asylum. Elsewhere, Cobblepot (Robin Lord Taylor) wakes up in Nygma's (Cory Michael Smith) apartment. When he begins to panic, Nygma sedates him to sleep again.

Bruce (David Mazouz) tries to get the information about his parents' killer from Silver (Natalie Alyn Lind), but is stopped by Alfred (Sean Pertwee), who asks Silver to leave. Silver gives Bruce her hotel key. Lee and Gordon's relationship gets tense after Lee watched Gordon kiss Barbara during the interrogation. While in the elevator to Galavan's penthouse, Gordon is attacked by a hitman, Billy Boy (Jon Sklaroff), but he manages to defeat him. Finding out he failed, The Lady sends more hitmen to kill Gordon.

When Billy Boy regains consciousness, Gordon asks him who sent him. When Billy doesn't reveal anything, Gordon nearly throws him from the penthouse until he is stopped by Barnes (Michael Chiklis). While Barnes chastises Gordon, hitmen arrive at the penthouse. The unarmed forensics officer, standing guard at the door, is killed by a hitman entering from the stairs. The hitmen enter the penthouse and a gun battle begins. The officers appear to kill all of the hitmen, but in the chaos, Billy Boy frees himself and takes Officer Parks (Ashlei Sharpe Chestnut) hostage. Gordon shoots him in the eye, using his round glasses frame as a bullseye. Gordon and Barnes discover a hidden monk's cassock of Galavan's, but, before they can investigate its meaning, an only injured hitman regains consciousness and stabs Barnes in the leg, prompting Barnes to shoot him in the stomach. The Lady then sends another hitman, Eduardo Flamingo (Raúl Castillo) to kill Gordon.

Cobblepot wakes up again and tries to leave, but Nygma prevents him from doing so, stating he's a wanted man for the attempted murder of Galavan. Cobblepot begins to feel guilty after having failed to protect his mother. Nygma tries to help him by offering him a captured associate of Galavan, Leonard, to kill, as retaliation for the murder of his mother. Cobblepot refuses and sobs in the bed. They bond together over the respective deaths of their loved ones. Nygma says having no one whom they love makes them free, because they cannot be threatened. They decide to have fun with Leonard.

The police officers arrive but they're killed by Flamingo. Gordon, seeing this on the closed circuit TV, goes down to the street below, and is attacked by Flamingo. Although Flamingo gets the upper hand, Gordon defeats him. Gordon can't make himself kill Flamingo and arrests him. However, at the GCPD, Flamingo bites Parks' neck and she later dies from blood loss. Selina (Camren Bicondova) visits Bruce and convinces him she has enough proof about Silver. Tabitha visits Galavan in jail, where Galavan expresses his anger for hiring hitmen, when he expressly told her to do nothing, and states that if she does it again, he'll kill her. Later that night, the religious sect of the Galavans arrive in Gotham City where they're greeted by Father Creel (Ron Rifkin). They then kill a patrol officer when he sees them and begin to advance to Gotham City.

== Production ==
=== Casting ===
Michelle Gomez was announced to guest star in this episode just two days before the episode aired. According to her, the episode may not be her only appearance in the show. This is the first episode in the series where Donal Logue doesn't appear as Harvey Bullock.

== Reception ==
=== Ratings ===
The episode was watched by 4.35 million viewers with a 1.4/4 share among adults aged 18 to 49. This was an increase in viewership from the previous episode, which was watched by 4.11 million viewers. This made Gotham the most watched program of the day in FOX, beating Minority Report.

With Live+7 DVR viewing factored in, the episode had an overall rating of 6.79 million viewers, and a 2.6 in the 18–49 demographic.

=== Critical reviews ===
Professional ratings
Review scores
Source	Rating
Rotten Tomatoes (Tomatometer)	77%
Rotten Tomatoes (Average Score)	7.6
IGN	8.0
The A.V. Club	C+
Paste Magazine	8.0
TV Fanatic	5/5 stars
The Young Folks	9/10
JoBlo	8/10
New York Magazine	2/5 stars

"Rise of the Villains: A Bitter Pill to Swallow" received mostly positive reviews from critics. The episode received a rating of 77% with an average score of 7.6 out of 10 on the review aggregator Rotten Tomatoes, with the site's consensus stating: "Gotham gives Jim Gordon some much-needed depth in 'A Bitter Pill to Swallow,' although the surrounding stories are less cohesive."

Matt Fowler of IGN gave the episode a "great" 8 out 10 and wrote in his verdict, "Aside from the Bruce being "grounded" story, this week's 'A Bitter Pill to Swallow' was really, and violently, eventful. It even contained a moment - the death of Parks - that topped Jerome's slaughter of all those GCPD cops months back. Whether or not it was something you were comfortable watching however is another issue. Also, I enjoyed Barnes opening up more as a character and the Riddler/Penguin pairing quite a bit."

The A.V. Club's Kyle Fowle gave the episode a "C+" grade and wrote, "The problem with using 'Rise Of The Villains' as this season's subtitle is that it's such a generic phrase as to be virtually meaningless. Wasn't last season also about the rise of the villains? And which villains are we talking about, anyway? If a subtitle is to have any use at all, it’s to bring some sort of focus to the proceedings, but since almost anything that happens on Gotham can fall under that heading, the show is just as prone to sprawl as it has been from the beginning. Tonight's storylines are connected inasmuch as they all spring from Galavan's presence in Gotham, but since he is barely glimpsed until the episode's final minutes, 'A Bitter Pill To Swallow' still feels like a disparate collection of stories in search of a center.
