= Scarification (disambiguation) =

Scarification is the practice of cutting designs into the skin as a form of body modification.

It may also refer to:

- Scarification (botany), a process used to encourage germination in plants
- Scarification (Gotham), a TV series Gotham episode

== See also ==
"Scarification" may also be involved in:

- Intradermal injection
- Silviculture
- Bloodletting
