= By Fire =

- Gotham episode
- Episode no.: Season 2 Episode 6
- Directed by: TJ Scott
- Written by: Rebecca Perry Cutter
- Production code: 4X6206
- Original air date: October 26, 2015

Guest appearances
- Chelsea Spack as Kristen Kringle; Natalie Alyn Lind as Silver St. Cloud; Clare Foley as Ivy Pepper; Paulina Singer as Officer Josie Mac; Michelle Veintimilla as Bridgit Pike; Leo Fitzpatrick as Joe Pike; Lucas Salvagno as Sal Martinez; Ian Quinlan as Carl Pinkney; Carol Kane as Gertrude Kapelput

Episode chronology
← Previous "Scarification"	Next → "Mommy's Little Monster"
- Gotham season 2

"By Fire" is the sixth episode of the second season and 28th episode overall from the FOX series Gotham. The episode was written by Rebecca Perry Cutter and directed by TJ Scott. It was first broadcast on October 26, 2015, in FOX. Continuing from the previous episode, Bridgit Pike decides to kill her brothers after being abused, going into a vigilante crusade, forcing Gordon to stop her with the help from Selina Kyle. Kringle's and Edward Nygma's relationship turns into a tragedy, while Penguin decides to free his mother from Theo Galavan's clutches.

== Plot ==
As part of their plan to get his mother back, Butch tells Theo Galavan that Cobblepot cut off his hand for thinking he betrayed him and offers to work for Galavan. Galavan initially declines, stating that his associates "have both hands". Tabitha agrees to let him join them but Barbara is skeptical, citing when Butch kidnapped her. Finally, Galavan lets Butch be part of his operation. Galavan also threatens to kill a congressman if he does not support him in the elections, which ends when the congressman agrees to his terms and his life is spared.

Meanwhile, the strike force, led by Gordon, catch a thug and accuse him of being the arsonist who killed Officer Garrett in the previous episode. Bridgit is having a rough time after having killed the police officer. She lives with Selina, but continues to feel guilty. Selina proposes to get money so she can leave Gotham City, and both of them steal money from a human trafficking slave-ring. During their escape, they are caught on camera, and Gordon recognizes Selina. On their way to the bus station, Bridgit is kidnapped by the Pike brothers. Selina plans on rescuing her but is found by Gordon. Selina gives the information to Gordon, but Gordon states he will take care of the situation.

Nygma overhears Kringle talking to Lee at the GCPD, revealing that she is happy that her relationship with Nygma has been going well but believes that he is hiding something from her. Nygma enters the room, bringing Kringle coffee with a heart in it and invites her on a date that night.

Bridgit is brought back to the Pike home, where her brothers taunt her fear of fire by threatening her with firecrackers. Tired of their abuse, Bridgit kills them with a flamethrower. While looking for the whereabouts of Cobblepot's mother, Butch is discovered by Galavan and learns that he knows of his and Penguin's ruse. Galavan figures out that Oswald has a mental hold on Butch and tells Tabitha to try to beat it out of him. Selina reunites with Bridgit but realizes she's changed in her attitude and plans on taking down abusive people. Bridgit returns to the slave-ring, where she burns the captors and frees the women.

With a tip from Selina, Gordon, Barnes and the GCPD arrive at the slave-ring. Gordon tries to calm Bridgit, but she fights back. However, she accidentally catches fire while trying to defend herself. In an attempt to co-opt Bruce, Galavan proposes to help clean up the corruption in Wayne Enterprises. Butch escapes from the Galavans and tells Cobblepot his mother's whereabouts. Selina appears at Leslie and Gordon's apartment and is heartbroken when Gordon tells her Bridgit will not survive her injuries.

During their date, Nygma tries to tell Kringle a secret he's been hiding, but the two end up sleeping together. Later, Kringle confides in Nygma that she is worried that her ex-boyfriend Doughtery will come back and try to hurt her, but Nygma reveals to Kringle that he killed Dougherty while following her home one night and shows her Doughtery's police badge. Terrified, she tries to leave and tell someone, but he holds her against the door and tries to keep her from screaming, but he unknowingly strangles her, and she dies in his arms, leaving him shouting and crying in grief.

In an underground facility of a division of Wayne Enterprises, Bridgit, still alive, is brought to Indian Hill labs where scientists experiment on human beings.

== Reception ==
=== Ratings ===
The episode was watched by 4.32 million viewers. This was an increase in viewership from the previous episode, which was watched by 4.19 million viewers. This made Gotham the most watched program of the day in FOX, beating Minority Report.

=== Critical reception ===
"Rise of the Villains: By Fire" received positive reviews from critics. The episode received a rating of 79% with an average score of 6.5 out of 10 on the review aggregator Rotten Tomatoes, with the site's consensus stating: "Though season two continues to struggle with tonal consistency, 'By Fire' sets up a fun showdown between some of Gotham's most explosive characters."

Matt Fowler of IGN gave the episode a "good" 7.4 out of 10 and wrote in his verdict: "'By Fire' may have been another one of this show's villain-as-a-kid origin tales, but it was utilized nicely right at the end to open up a whole new side of the series - that of the Indian Hill monster farm."

The A.V. Club's Kyle Fowle gave the episode a "C" grade and wrote, "The biggest problem plaguing 'By Fire,' and really Gotham as a whole, is that it wants to explore the story of Gordon’s potentially compromised morality with as much gravitas as possible while also insisting that the more comic and cartoonish tendencies are fine because hey, this is just a comic book show, right? It’s a flippancy that’s insulting to anyone who watches the show and tries to invest in these characters, and it’s a general lack of attention paid to storytelling that results in frustrating swings in tone."
