= Mad Grey Dawn =

- Gotham episode
- Episode no.: Season 2 Episode 15
- Directed by: Nick Copus
- Written by: Robert Hull
- Production code: 4X6215
- Original air date: March 21, 2016

Guest appearances
- Paul Reubens as Elijah Van Dahl; Melinda Clarke as Grace Van Dahl; Ian Quinlan as Carl Pinkney; Clare Foley as Ivy Pepper; Kaley Ronayne as Sasha Van Dahl; Justin Mark as Charles Van Dahl; Jerry Dixon as Mr. Thatch; Paul Pilcz as Sonny Gilzean

Episode chronology
← Previous "This Ball of Mud and Meanness"	Next → "Prisoners"
- Gotham season 2

"Mad Grey Dawn" is the fifteenth episode of the second season, and 37th episode overall from the Fox series Gotham. The episode was written by Robert Hull and directed by Nick Copus. It was first broadcast on March 21, 2016. In the episode, Gordon and Bullock investigate a pair of clues in a museum, unaware that Edward Nygma is the perpetrator. Meanwhile, Bruce continues living in the streets with Selina and Cobblepot meets a man who knew about his mother.

The episode was watched by 3.89 million viewers, both a season and series low, but received positive reviews with Ben McKenzie and Michael Chiklis' performances praised, especially during the interrogation scene as well as Nygma's character development.

== Plot ==
In the Gotham Museum of Art, Nygma (Cory Michael Smith) uses a decoy bomb to steal a painting, "The Mad Grey Dawn", leaving a green spray painted question mark where the painting was. Barnes (Michael Chiklis) assigns Gordon (Ben McKenzie) and Bullock (Donal Logue) to investigate the robbery. He also confronts Gordon about an anonymous tip stating he killed Theo Galavan, but Gordon denies any involvement.

Having been released from Arkham Asylum, Cobblepot (Robin Lord Taylor) visits Butch (Drew Powell) and Tabitha (Jessica Lucas). Tabitha orders their henchmen to kill him but Butch chooses to spare him, acknowledging that Cobblepot has changed, but lets Tabitha humiliate him by tarring and feathering him.

Gordon and Bullock meet with museum curator, Thatch (Jerry Dixon), who tells them that apart from stealing the painting, two other paintings had question marks spray painted on them. Gordon realizes the question marks are above the artists' names, "Marché" and "LaRue". As Marché means market and LaRue means road, Gordon deduces Market Street. Also, the stolen painting has an exploding train on it and is called "Bloody Monday", Gordon finally realizes there is a bomb at the train station on Market Street. They arrive at the train station where they discover an explosive device in a locker. Gordon throws the device in an open stone column before it detonates.

Bruce (David Mazouz) and Selina (Camren Bicondova) rendezvous with Ivy (Clare Foley), who is working for Butch's nephew, Sonny (Paul Pilcz) experimenting on psychedelic mushrooms. They dose part of the gang with mushrooms and steal their money but are stopped by Sonny's arrival. Bruce confronts Sonny and gets severely beaten, but, upon recalling Alfred's advice, finally beats him. He and Selina escape. Cobblepot visits his mother's grave where he encounters a man, Elijah Van Dahl (Paul Reubens) leaving flowers on her grave. Upon learning Cobblepot's age and his being her son, Van Dahl realizes Cobblepot is also his son. He takes Cobblepot to his manor where he introduces him to his wife Grace (Melinda Clarke), and his children Charles (Justin Mark) and Sasha (Kaley Ronayne). He also reveals to him that Gertrude never told him he had a son as his family would disapprove of such a relationship.

Gordon is notified by Bullock that a contact in Internal Affairs that IA has re-opened the investigation into Galavan's murder and that Gordon is the prime suspect. Lee (Morena Baccarin) is terrified since Gordon assured her that the problem was over. Nygma visits Strike Force member, Carl Pinkney (Ian Quinlan) and kills him. Bullock directs Gordon to a payphone where the bomb threat was phoned in, where Gordon discovers Pinkney's corpse. Barnes arrives and assumes Gordon killed Pinkney as Pinkney (Nygma in fact) had texted him to talk to him about Gordon.

He arrests him and states the weapon, a crow bar, has Gordon's fingerprints on it, as Gordon used it to open the locker in the train station. Nygma also used a ruse to get Pinkney to sign a report which could implicate him as the informant accusing Gordon. Gordon is tried and declared guilty of the murders. In Arkham, Barbara (Erin Richards) finally wakes up while listening to Gordon's trial. Lee visits Gordon, who, for Lee's sake, tells her to never contact him again. The episode ends as Gordon is transferred to Blackgate Penitentiary where Bullock states he will find whoever set him up.

== Production ==
=== Development ===
The fifteenth episode of the season was titled "Mad Grey Dawn", and was written by Robert Hull, with Nick Copus directing.

=== Casting ===
Sean Pertwee, James Frain, Chris Chalk, and Nicholas D'Agosto don't appear in the episode as their respective characters. The guest cast for the episode included Paul Reubens as Elijah Van Dahl, Melinda Clarke as Grace Van Dahl, Ian Quinlan as Carl Pinkney, Clare Foley as Ivy Pepper, Kaley Ronayne as Sasha Van Dahl, Justin Mark as Charles Van Dahl, Jerry Dixon as Thatch, and Paul Pilcz as Sonny Gilzean.

== Reception ==
=== Viewers ===
The episode was watched by 3.89 million viewers with a 1.3/4 share among adults aged 18 to 49. This was a decrease in viewership from the previous episode, which was watched by 4.01 million viewers. With this ratings, Gotham was the most-watched program of the day in FOX, beating out Lucifer, the 28th in the 18-49 demographics, and the 45th most watched overall in the week.

With Live+7 DVR viewing factored in, the episode had an overall rating of 5.98 million viewers, and a 2.1 in the 18–49 demographic.

=== Critical reviews ===
Professional ratings
Review scores
Source	Rating
Rotten Tomatoes (Tomatometer)	91%
Rotten Tomatoes (Average Score)	7.9
IGN	8.0
The A.V. Club	B−
TV Fanatic	4.25/5 stars
TV Overmind	4/5 stars
Lyles Movie Files	9.0

"Wrath of the Villains: Mad Grey Dawn" received positive reviews from critics. The episode received a rating of 91% with an average score of 7.9 out of 10 on the review aggregator Rotten Tomatoes with the consensus stating: "A focus on Jim Gordon helps 'Mad Grey Dawn' establish momentum toward Gotham's season finale, and more than makes up for any inconsistencies in the jumping timeline.".

Matt Fowler of IGN gave the episode a "great" 8.0 out of 10 and wrote in his verdict, "'Mad Grey Dawn' could have easily been a wheel-spinner. With the hook simply being Nygma's first attempt at being The Riddler. It didn't have to lead anywhere. I mean, a lot of other villain origin stories didn't. But the show went big here and made Nygma's scheme very important and super impactful."

The A.V. Club's Kyle Fowle gave the episode a "B−" grade and wrote, "If there's something consistent about Gotham it's that, from week to week, the show remains jumbled. Gotham is often a mess of subplots and character motivations, the show failing to find a way to make everything cohere. 'Wrath Of The Villains: Mad Grey Dawn' is only the fourth episode since the show's winter hiatus, and yet the back half of this season already feels like a lost opportunity, with the show seemingly refusing to construct something compelling out of the pieces that were put into place by the fall finale. Essentially, the back half of this season has spent so much time on relatively meaningless subplots, including a Mr. Freeze story that operated in a vacuum and a Penguin subplot that's still spinning its wheels, that the real story of Jim Gordon going against everything he believes in, has been lost."

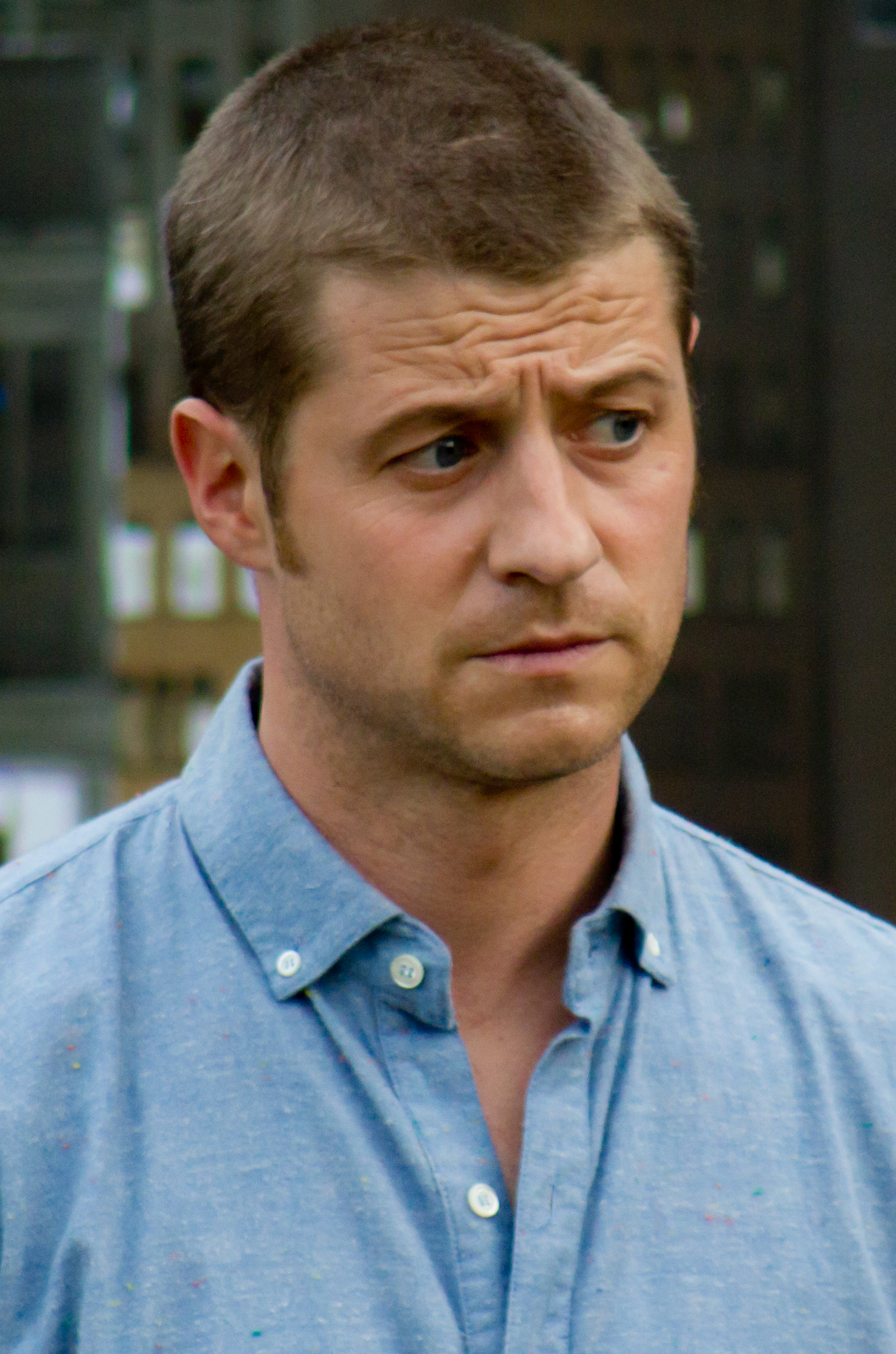
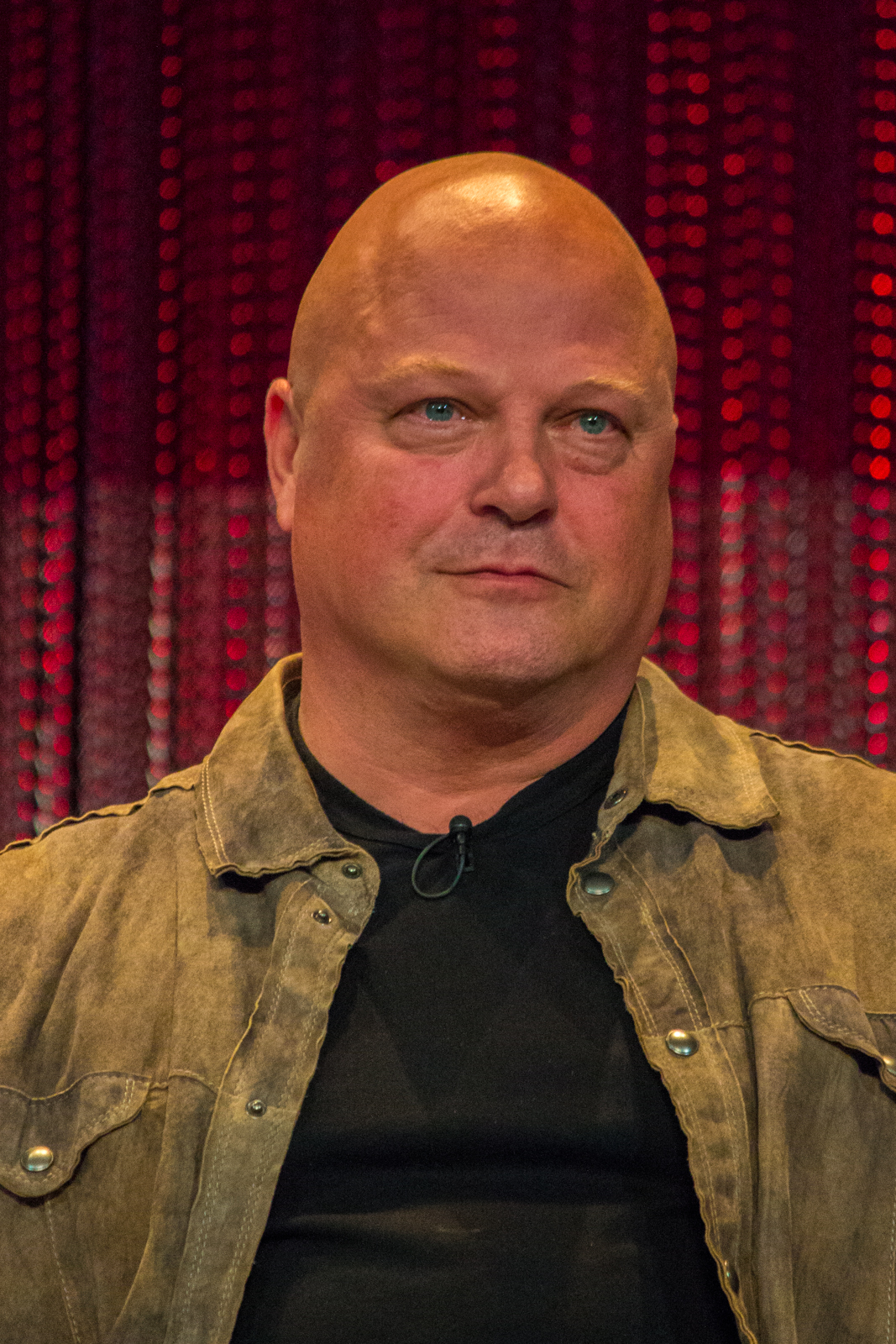
Ben McKenzie (left) and Michael Chiklis (right)'s performances were praised by critics, with many highlighting the interrogation scene.

Andy Behbakht of TV Overmind gave the series a star rating of 4 out of 5, writing "Overall, this was another solid episode where a lot of moving pieces went forward and it continues to make this second half of the season a lot stronger and enjoyable. The only thing that I'm curious to see at this point is how Butch and Tabitha play into anything that is happening right now on this show." Robert Yaniz, Jr., writing for ScreenRant also praised the episode: "Gotham takes a break from its ongoing Hugo Strange tale following the surprise reveal at the end of last week's episode to continue following the evolution of two fan-favorite villains. As the season continues to build toward the finale, the pieces of this second half are starting to fall into place, setting the stage for what could very well be the most explosive run of episodes the show has seen thus far."

Keertana Sastry of EW stated: "Is anyone else genuinely confused by the turn of events on Monday night's Gotham? After a rather slow start to the episode, 'Wrath of the Villains: Mad Grey Dawn' kicked into high gear in the last five minutes by exposing that Gordon did kill Theo Galavan through a perfectly orchestrated set up by the man who should now most certainly be called the Riddler, Edward Nygma. And if that wasn't enough, the episode then sped through the entire trial process and instantly sentenced Gordon to prison for his crimes. I have been consistently baffled by the pacing of this show."

Karmen Fox from The Baltimore Sun wrote positively about the episode, stating: "The writers have done an excellent job again drawing parallels between Jim and Bruce. Just as Bruce has immersed himself in Gotham's criminal underworld, Jim has completely surrounded himself with convictions." Lisa Babick from TV Fanatic, gave a 4.25 star rating out of 5, stating: "While I absolutely loved everything about 'Mad Grey Dawn', the ending with Jim's interrogation room flashbacks and the fast forward to a conviction four weeks later was absolutely maddening. Why did Gotham have to destroy such a perfect episode with such perfect ridiculousness?!"
