= Mommy's Little Monster (Gotham) =

- Gotham episode
- Episode no.: Season 2 Episode 7
- Directed by: Kenneth Fink
- Written by: Robert Hull
- Production code: 4X6207
- Original air date: November 2, 2015

Guest appearances
- Anthony Carrigan as Victor Zsasz; Chelsea Spack as Kristen Kringle; Natalie Alyn Lind as Silver St. Cloud; Lucas Salvagno as Sal Martinez; Ian Quinlan as Carl Pinkney; Carol Kane as Gertrude Kapelput

Episode chronology
← Previous "By Fire"	Next → "Tonight's the Night"
- Gotham season 2

"Mommy's Little Monster" is the seventh episode of the second season and 29th episode overall from the FOX series Gotham. The episode was written by Robert Hull and directed by Kenneth Fink. It was first broadcast in November 2, 2015 in FOX. In this episode, Penguin and Butch release Penguin's mother, but is killed by Galavans, forcing the Penguin into his vengeful conquest against them. Gordon, Bullock and GCPD are forced to protect Theo Galavan from him, but Gordon learns the truth behind Galavan's machinations.

The episode received positive reviews with Taylor’s emotional performance as Oswald Cobblepot receiving critical acclaim, with many critics citing the opening scene. Nygma’s storyline also received praise.

== Plot ==
Butch (Drew Powell) leads Cobblepot (Robin Lord Taylor) to a warehouse in the port where his mother is being held. While trying to release her from her cell, Galavan (James Frain) and Tabitha (Jessica Lucas) arrive, revealing the only way to release her is from a key Galavan only possesses. Cobblepot orders Butch to kill them, but instead, Butch kills Cobblepot's henchmen. Tabitha is revealed to have reversed Butch's brainwashing. Cobblepot pleads for his mother's life and Tabitha releases her. While Cobblepot and Kapelput hug, Tabitha stabs her in the back. She dies in Cobblepot's arms and Galavan orders Butch to kill him and dispose of their bodies. Cobblepot calls Galavan and all his ancestors "cowards" for not killing him himself and Galavan decides to do it personally. While Galavan is aiming his gun at him, Cobblepot removes Tabitha's knife from his mother's back and slashes Galavan's throat and escapes through a window, vowing to kill Galavan.

In his apartment, Nygma (Cory Michael Smith) begins to suffer nightmares after accidentally killing Kristen Kringle (Chelsea Spack). He is even further tormented by the evil personification of himself. He realizes that the personification removed Kringle's body while he slept and needs to find it. Meanwhile, Galavan is elected mayor of Gotham City with the support of Gordon (Benjamin McKenzie) in exchange for help in cleaning up the GCPD. Galavan then claims that the knife wound on his neck came when Cobblepot proposed that the mayor-elect should join up with him to rule the city, and Galavan "politely declined." Captain Barnes (Michael Chiklis) and Harvey Dent get an arrest and search warrant for Cobblepot and his allies. Galavan also imposes a curfew and martial law in order to find Cobblepot.

Still distraught at Bridgit's "death", Selina (Camren Bicondova) visits Bruce (David Mazouz) and is introduced to Silver St. Cloud. While Selina and Silver are alone, Silver threatens Selina if she ever visits Bruce again. Later, with Bruce as a witness, Selina accuses Silver of faking everything and insults her, which prompts Silver to leave. Bruce then tells Selina to leave, and says that they're no longer friends. While pursuing Butch, Gordon reveals to Bullock (Donal Logue) that he may have found some links between Galavan and Mayor James's abduction. They find Butch and his crew but they are ambushed by Victor Zsasz and his gunmen. Butch's crew abandon him and Gordon threatens to deliver Butch to Zsasz if he doesn't tell them what's going on. Butch reveals Galavan was the behind the Mayor's abduction, the assassination of the candidates, and the kidnapping of Cobblepot's mother, before escaping.

Nygma begins to solve his alter ego's riddles at the GCPD HQ in order to find Kringle's corpse. He finds her hand in a vending machine and her corpse in the medical examiner's morgue. He is nearly discovered by Leslie (Morena Baccarin) but he narrowly manages to deflect her by inviting her out to discuss issues him and Kringle have been having in their relationship. That night, Galavan organizes a victory celebration, aware that Cobblepot will try to kill him. The watch sniper, Martinez, stands guard in the roof and notices Penguin and his gang. Penguin is apparently killed by Tabitha, but is shown to be a decoy and the group turns out to be a large amount of heavily armed Penguin imposters. Martinez is killed by Tabitha after confronting her on the roof. The impostors arrive at the party and a shootout occurs. While trying to lead Galavan away from the party, Gordon is confronted at gunpoint by Penguin. Penguin asks Gordon to step aside by emotionally stating that Galavan killed his mother. Gordon contemplates what to do, while Galavan orders him to kill Penguin. Tabitha shoots Cobblepot; while Gordon and Bullock shoot at her, Cobblepot escapes in Galavan's limo.

In the aftermath of the massacre, Silver kisses Bruce while Selina watches from outside. Gordon decides to investigate Galavan after he confronts him for not shooting Cobblepot and everything he heard. Nygma returns to the morgue and is confronted again by the evil personality. The evil personality convinces Nygma that he enjoyed the killing and leaving riddles. Both Nygma's personalities merge and he prepares to dispose of Kringle's corpse.

== Reception ==
=== Ratings ===
The episode was watched by 4.27 million viewers. This was a decrease in viewership from the previous episode, which was watched by 4.32 million viewers. This made Gotham the most watched program of the day in FOX, beating Minority Report.

=== Critical reviews ===
"Rise of the Villains: Mommy's Little Monster" received positive reviews from critics. The episode received a rating of 71% with an average score of 6.4 out of 10 on the review aggregator Rotten Tomatoes, with the site's consensus stating: "Even though it dwells too long on Bruce's teenage drama, 'Mommy's Little Villain' is mostly an action-packed episode of Gotham with new developments for many of the major characters."

Matt Fowler of IGN gave the episode a "good" 7.5 out of 10 and wrote in his verdict: "'Mommy's Little Monster' made some big moves in the lives of Penguin and Nygma while also allowing Gordon to learn the truth about Theo. Naturally though, there were some hiccups. A lot of the cop stuff plays out in wonky ways and Gordon never really seems to make the best decisions when it comes to confronting his enemies. Or ascertaining their actual danger. But - hey! - let's give it up for AN ACTUAL MENTION OF HIS APARTMENT. A place he must have somehow gotten between now and when he was crashing in the precinct locker room. IT EXISTS!"

The A.V. Club's Kyle Fowle gave the episode a "B−" grade and wrote, "There's no telling if the cohesive threads in 'Mommy's Little Monster' will hold together and begin to unravel at just the right time, but at least the episode shows signs of what Gotham can be. This is an episode with a bevy of solid Bullock one-liners, a determined and menacing Penguin, and a clear narrative complete with fun twists and contemplation of forthcoming consequences—we'll just ignore the horrible (pre?) teen love triangle for now. It's not perfect, but it's Gotham with a purpose, and that’s more than can be said for most of this season so far.
