= This Ball of Mud and Meanness =

- Gotham episode
- Episode no.: Season 2 Episode 14
- Directed by: John Behring
- Written by: Jordan Harper
- Production code: 4X6214
- Original air date: March 14, 2016

Guest appearances
- B. D. Wong as Dr. Hugo Strange; Tonya Pinkins as Ethel Peabody; Lori Petty as Jeri; Ian Quinlan as Carl Pinkney; Michael Bowen as Patrick "Matches" Malone; Stink Fisher as Aaron Helzinger; Jamar Green as Terrence "Cupcake" Shaw; Carol Kane as Gertrude Kapelput

Episode chronology
← Previous "A Dead Man Feels No Cold"	Next → "Mad Grey Dawn"
- Gotham season 2

"This Ball of Mud and Meanness" is the fourteenth episode of the second season, and 36th episode overall from the FOX series Gotham. The episode was written by Jordan Harper and directed by John Behring. It was first broadcast on March 14, 2016 in FOX. In the episode, Bruce sets out to find "Matches" Malone, the man who killed his parents. Meanwhile, Gordon investigates Kristen Kringle's disappearance, worrying Nygma.

The episode was watched by 4.01 million viewers and received critical acclaim with David Mazouz's performance receiving universal acclaim. Two days after the episode aired, FOX announced Gotham was renewed for a third season.

== Plot ==
Cobblepot (Robin Lord Taylor) continues to be disturbed by the torture sessions at Arkham Asylum where he imagines watching himself beat his mother (Carol Kane). On orders from Strange (B. D. Wong), he is served ice cream in the dining hall and is assaulted by an inmate for the ice cream, but shows no signs of violence. In an alley, Bruce (David Mazouz) receives a gun from Selina (Camren Bicondova), that he intends to use to kill Patrick "Matches" Malone. Lee (Morena Baccarin) shows Gordon (Benjamin McKenzie) the paychecks from Kristen Kringle (Chelsea Spack) that she never picked up. Gordon questions Nygma (Cory Michael Smith) about Kringle's disappearance, but he denies knowing anything.

Bruce and Alfred (Sean Pertwee) find out about Matches' partner, Cupcake (Jamar Green), who leads an underground fight club; Cupcake agrees to tell Bruce where Matches is if Alfred fights with him. Using his SAS experience, Alfred wins the fight. Cupcake tells them to look for Jeri (Lori Petty), the woman who knows Matches' whereabouts. Alfred is taken to the hospital and falls unconscious, after which Bruce leaves the hospital. Gordon and Bullock (Donal Logue) are then notified of his plans to kill Matches.

Bruce arrives at a club owned by Jeri (Lori Petty), the patrons of which are all influenced by Jerome Valeska's acts. After toying with him, she finally gives him Matches' address. Gordon arrives at the club and stops Bruce, but Gordon is restrained by Jeri's group, allowing Bruce to escape. Bruce finally reaches Matches' (Michael Bowen) apartment. Matches admits to killing Bruce's parents and states that he was contracted by someone to do it, but refuses to reveal their identity. Bruce refrains from killing Matches at the last moment, realizing Matches is suicidal. Gordon arrives at the apartment but is unable to stop Matches from taking his own life.

Alfred finds a note in Wayne Manor from Bruce, in which Bruce details his intention to live in the streets with Selina for a time, as a way to know more about fighting crime and be better prepared to save Gotham in the future. Cobblepot is released from Arkham Asylum after being declared sane, although Strange states to Ethel Peabody (Tonya Pinkins) that he still has plans for experiments on him. Nygma discovers Gordon investigating Kringle's disappearance and swears to outsmart him. In his apartment, Nygma reads about Gordon and draws a green question mark over his face.

== Production ==
=== Development ===
The fourteenth episode of the season is titled "This Ball of Mud and Meanness", written by Jordan Harper, with John Behring as director.

=== Casting ===
Erin Richards, James Frain, Jessica Lucas, Chris Chalk, Drew Powell, Nicholas D'Agosto, and Michael Chiklis don't appear in the episode as their respective characters. The guest cast for the episode include B. D. Wong as Professor Hugo Strange, Tonya Pinkins as Ethel Peabody, Lori Petty as Jeri, Ian Quinlan as Carl Pinkney, Michael Bowen as Patrick "Matches" Malone, Stink Fisher as Aaron Helzinger, Jamar Green as Terrence "Cupcake" Shaw, and Carol Kane as Gertrude Kapelput.

== Reception ==
=== Viewers ===
The episode was watched by 4.01 million viewers with a 1.3/4 share among adults aged 18 to 49. This was a decrease in viewership from the previous episode, which was watched by 4.54 million viewers. With this ratings, Gotham was the most-watched program of the day in FOX, beating out Lucifer, the 27th in the 18-49 demographics, and the 67th most watched overall in the week.

With Live+7 DVR viewing factored in, the episode had an overall rating of 6.32 million viewers, and a 2.3 in the 18–49 demographic.

=== Critical reviews ===
Professional ratings
Review scores
Source	Rating
Rotten Tomatoes (Tomatometer)	90%
Rotten Tomatoes (Average Score)	9.0
IGN	7.3
The A.V. Club	D
TV Fanatic	5/5 stars
TV Overmind	5/5 stars
Lyles Movie Files	9.8

"Wrath of the Villains: This Ball of Mud and Meanness" received critical acclaim from critics. The episode received a rating of 90% with an average score of 9.0 out of 10 on the review aggregator Rotten Tomatoes with the consensus stating: "A masterful performance by young David Mazouz and the beginnings of a gratifying Riddler transformation pave the way for "This Ball of Mud and Meanness" to explore Bruce Wayne's newly maddened soul."

Matt Fowler of IGN gave the episode a "good" 7.3 out of 10 and wrote in his verdict, "'The Ball of Mud and Meanness' was really mostly about Bruce coming face to face with Matches, and the clunky ways of driving him toward that confrontation. Though, once there, the moment with Matches was very well done. And even though some things played out as expected, there were still enough smaller nuances that helped make it great."

In one of the few negative reviews, The A.V. Club's Kyle Fowle gave the episode a "D" grade and wrote, "Let's lay out the huge problem with 'This Ball Of Mud And Meanness' right off the bat: it's an entire episode built around Bruce Wayne hunting down the man who killed his parents, which is a revenge tale that has no end in sight and also contains no real dramatic stakes. The problem with the 'who murdered the Waynes?' story is more than just knowing that Bruce Wayne becomes Batman. With enough good storytelling, we could ignore that fact and just enjoy the process of seeing Bruce get there. But Gotham has no interest in actually digging into the psychology of Bruce Wayne, or how his traumatic experience affected him, or how the corrosion of Gotham, potentially at the hands of his parents, creates the need for villains and heroes. Instead, Gotham continues to coast on the canon. It's like a mirage in a dry desert; the promise is that if you just keep crawling towards your destination, despite evidence suggesting that once you get there you'll be disappointed, everything will be fine."

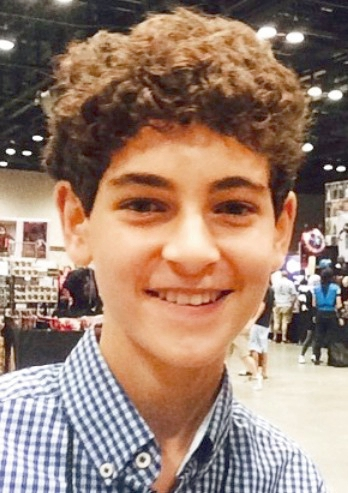
David Mazouz's performance in the episode received universal acclaim from critics.

Andy Behbakht of TV Overmind gave the series a perfect star rating of 5 out of 5, writing "This week's Gotham was one of the strongest episode of the second half for Season 2 so far as Bruce's arc got to a very compelling point while Penguin continues to go through a hellish time at Arkham that takes a surprising turn of event at the end." Robert Yaniz, Jr., writing for ScreenRant also praised the episode: "After honing in on its Mr. Freeze origin story in the last two episodes, Gotham finally turns its attention to young Bruce Wayne's encounter with the man who he believes killed his parents. Meanwhile, Penguin's story gets even stranger as his therapy continues at Arkham, and Nygma draws ever closer to his destiny as one of Gotham's most notorious super-villains."

Keertana Sastry of EW reacted positive, stating: "Monday night's episode of Gotham, 'This Ball of Mud and Meanness,' focuses on change. Oswald continues his 'treatment' with Hugo, which is clearly leading to all kinds of change within our former 'King' of the Gotham City underworld. Bruce finally learns the gravity of what it means to kill a man. And Ed's transformation into the Riddler is getting deliciously close to complete."

David Mazouz's performance in the episode was acclaimed by critics. Karmen Fox from The Baltimore Sun wrote positively about the episode and Mazouz, stating: "Bruce has lost his mind, and 'Gotham' has never been better. Usually, Bruce's coming-of-age plotlines that show his transformation into Batman are shoved to the side in 'Gotham.' But the gradual buildup over the past season and a half make the tension worthwhile when he confronted his biggest foe: Matches Malone, the man who killed his parents." Lisa Babick from TV Fanatic, giving a perfect 5 star rating out of 5, highlighted David Mazouz's performance in the episode, stating "If there were any doubts about David Mazouz's ability to transform into Batman whenever that time comes, those doubts were shattered (like Bruce's childhood) after his brilliantly understated performance this hour."

Vinnie Mancuso from New York Observer also highlighted Mazouz's performance, writing "I...genuinely loved this; completely, unironically loved the performances put in by both Mr. Bowen and David Mazouz, who at 15-years-old can display more complex emotions with his face than I've ever had actual complex emotions. Of course, yeah, there is always a part of me that wishes Gotham would stick a middle-finger directly into the camera and say 'screw your canon, nerds!' and have a young Bruce Wayne shoot a Breaking Bad Nazi in the face. But no, this worked, and it worked because of Matches Malone."
