= Azrael (Gotham episode) =

- Gotham episode
- Episode no.: Season 2 Episode 19
- Directed by: Larysa Kondracki
- Written by: Jim Barnes; Ken Woodruff
- Cinematography by: Crescenzo Notarile
- Production code: 4X6219
- Original air date: May 2, 2016
- Running time: 44 minutes

Guest appearances
- B. D. Wong as Dr. Hugo Strange; Tonya Pinkins as Ethel Peabody; Stink Fisher as Aaron Helzinger

Episode chronology
← Previous "Pinewood"	Next → "Unleashed"
- Gotham season 2

"Azrael" is the nineteenth episode of the second season, and 41st episode overall from the Fox series Gotham. The episode was written by co-producer Jim Barnes and co-executive producer Ken Woodruff and directed by Larysa Kondracki. It was first broadcast on May 2, 2016. In the episode, Theo Galavan is finally resurrected and begins a killing spree across Gotham City, calling himself "Azrael" while Gordon and Bruce try to arrest Dr. Hugo Strange for his involvement in the resurrection and his inhuman experiments.

The episode received critical acclaim, with Azrael's introduction receiving the most recognition. The episode received two Primetime Emmy Award nominations for Outstanding Sound Editing for a Series and Outstanding Cinematography for a Single-Camera Series.

== Plot ==
Having been resurrected by Hugo Strange (B. D. Wong), Theo Galavan (James Frain) is suffering from almost complete memory loss and reciting the sacred book of the Order of Saint Dumas. Meanwhile, Gordon (Benjamin McKenzie) visits Strange to ask him about Karen Jennings' death and the Pinewood Farms program. Strange states that Thomas Wayne started it to heal every disease and denies his involvement. Gordon then shows Strange a warrant to see Victor Fries' corpse but Strange states they cremated him. Strange realizes Gordon made a false warrant so he would admit his lies.

While leaving Arkham Asylum, Gordon runs across Nygma (Cory Michael Smith) in the playroom. Later, Nygma overhears Strange and Peabody (Tonya Pinkins) complaining about Gordon's interference. Nygma suggests that he help them to kill Gordon but Strange refuses. But Nygma's attempt to prove his worth inspires Strange to provide Galavan with a story to give his fractured state of mind a sense of self. Using Saint Dumas scripture while claiming to be Adam Dumas, Strange convinces Galavan that he is the order's ancient warrior Azrael and directs him to kill Gordon.

Bruce (David Mazouz) is told by Gordon and Bullock (Donal Logue) that the evidence won't be enough to imprison Strange. Angered by this, Bruce reveals that he knows Gordon is responsible for killing Galavan, pushing his belief that the law is ineffective at bringing him true justice. While talking with Captain Barnes (Michael Chiklis), Gordon and Barnes are attacked by Azrael, who is forced to flee when the police arrive. While walking through an alley, Azrael sees a poster of Galavan's campaign which causes some of his memories to return before shrugging it off.

Barnes imprisons Gordon in a cell for aiding Karen Jennings' escape. Suddenly, the lights go off and Azrael shows up. He kills three officers and tries to kill Gordon. However, Gordon and Barnes escape to the balcony where Barnes fights with a pipe against Azrael and manages to break his sword and pull off his mask, realizing his identity. Azrael then stabs Barnes when Gordon appears. Azrael tries to flee but Gordon shoots him multiple times until he falls off the building, landing on a TV van. The news broadcasts that Galavan is alive and is Azrael, which Cobblepot (Robin Lord Taylor) witnesses from Dahl Manor. Likewise, Butch (Drew Powell), Tabitha (Jessica Lucas) and Barbara (Erin Richards) watch the report from their mansion, to their shock.

Barnes is transferred to the hospital. Nygma discovers a secret elevator in the hallway of Arkham Asylum, which directs him to Indian Hill labs, to his surprise. Gordon leaves the GCPD while from a distance, Azrael stands atop a bridge watching him.

== Production ==
=== Development ===
In April 2016, it was announced that the nineteenth episode of the season would be titled "Azrael", and was to be written by Jim Barnes and Ken Woodruff, with Larysa Kondracki directing.

=== Casting ===
Morena Baccarin, Camren Bicondova, Chris Chalk, and Nicholas D'Agosto don't appear in the episode as their respective characters. In April 2016, it was announced that the guest cast for the episode would include B. D. Wong as Professor Hugo Strange, Tonya Pinkins as Ethel Peabody and Stink Fisher as Aaron Helzinger.

== Reception ==
=== Viewers ===
The episode was watched by 3.59 million viewers with a 1.2/4 share among adults aged 18 to 49, reaching another series low. This was a decrease in viewership from the previous episode, which was watched by 3.72 million viewers. With this ratings, Gotham ranked first for FOX, beating Houdini & Doyle, fourth on its timeslot and ninth for the night on the 18-49 demographics, behind Blindspot, The Odd Couple, two episodes of Mike & Molly, NCIS: Los Angeles, a rerun of The Big Bang Theory, Dancing with the Stars and The Voice.

It was also the 32nd most watched of the week in the 18-49 demographics and the 59th most watched overall in the week. With Live+7 DVR viewing factored in, the episode had an overall rating of 5.77 million viewers, and a 2.1 in the 18–49 demographic.

=== Critical reviews ===
Professional ratings
Review scores
Source	Rating
Rotten Tomatoes (Tomatometer)	100%
Rotten Tomatoes (Average Score)	8.3
IGN	7.3
The A.V. Club	B+
TV Overmind	4.5/5.0 stars

"Wrath of the Villains: Azrael" received critical acclaim from critics. The episode received a rating of 100% with an average score of 8.3 out of 10 on the review aggregator Rotten Tomatoes.

Matt Fowler of IGN gave the episode a "good" 7.3 out of 10 and wrote in his verdict, "Gotham's version of Azrael was fun, even if it was a bit on-the-nose from a 'Gordon's sins coming back to haunt him' standpoint. Also, Ed Nygma's new role as a cunning evildoer is cool to watch. Strange, however, will most likely cause himself to lose this battle long before Gordon ever makes a definitive move."

The A.V. Club's Kyle Fowle gave the episode a "B+" grade and wrote, "One of the longest-running issues with Gotham has been its futile search for an identity. For almost two seasons now the show has struggled to define what it is and, more importantly, what it has to offer each and every week. That last point is especially significant in today's TV climate, where superhero shows are treated with the same amount of reverence afforded so-called prestige dramas; in fact, the age of Peak TV seems to make superhero shows even more popular, as their blend of episodic and serialized storytelling perfectly fit into models of both binge watching and week-to-week appointment viewing. Every show, to an extent, struggles to define what it is and what it has to offer, but superhero shows like The Flash, Arrow, and Marvel's Agent Carter have moved through those struggles and come out on the other side with a mostly cohesive vision. You know what you're getting from them every week in terms of storytelling, visual aesthetic, performances, tone, and themes. The same can't be said for Gotham, which feels like it's constantly changing shapes, forging new directions before abandoning them and starting all over again. There's no easy answer, but 'Azrael' at least suggests that Gotham does have some redeeming qualities mixed into its failed attempts at being a police procedural, superhero show, and lengthy origin story. When Gotham is good it's not taking itself too seriously while using its supporting performances to craft a story that's actually fun to watch unfold. 'Azrael' succeeds in large part because of the performances, as many of them are firing on all cylinders here."

Andy Behbakht of TV Overmind gave the series a star rating of 4.5 out of 5, writing "Overall, 'Azrael' was a very strong episode that did a solid job with introducing their version of Azrael and with only three episodes left of the season: things are starting to come full circle nicely."

Keertana Sastry of EW stated: "That's how Hugo Strange and his No. 2, Peabody, describe the newly revived Theo Galavan on Monday night's Gotham, 'Wrath of the Villains: Azrael,' and they could not be more right. As the title of the episode suggests, the Order of St. Dumas comes back in a big, big way to the series, but this time it's not Theo pulling the strings."
