= Leo Fitzpatrick =

American actor (born 1978)

- Born: Leonardo Aurellio Randy Fitzpatrick; August 10, 1978 (age 48); West Orange, New Jersey, U.S.
- Occupation: Actor
- Years active: 1994–present
- Spouse: Chrissie Miller (m. 2018)
- Children: 1

Leonardo Aurellio Randy Fitzpatrick (born August 10, 1978) is an American actor and co-director of the Marlborough Chelsea gallery. He is best known as Telly in Kids (1995) and Johnny Weeks in The Wire (2002–2004).

== Career ==
Fitzpatrick was discovered at age 14 by director Larry Clark skateboarding at Washington Square Park in New York City. Fitzpatrick was trying to perform certain skating tricks, and every time he was unsuccessful, he would scream and curse. Clark later cast him as Telly, the central character in the film Kids, then a supporting role in Bully.

Fitzpatrick has appeared in numerous films since his work with Clark, including Storytelling and City of Ghosts. After finishing Storytelling, he was cast in the Robert Redford vehicle The Last Castle (2001). Two days before filming was to begin, he was hit by a drunk driver, suffering severe nerve and muscle damage in his leg which left him unable to walk for a month, and he was dropped from the film.

In 2000, Fitzpatrick appeared in Bam Margera's CKY2K; he also appeared in CKY3 the following year. From 2002 to 2004, he had a recurring role as drug addict Johnny Weeks in the ensemble cast of the HBO series The Wire. Following this he had a string of guest roles on television series including My Name Is Earl (a recurring role), Carnivale, Law & Order: Criminal Intent, Sons of Anarchy, and Broad City.

In 2013, he had a supporting role in the film Cold Comes the Night starring Bryan Cranston.

== Personal life ==
Fitzpatrick has been in a relationship with creative director Chrissie Miller since 2008. They have a child, born in 2016. The couple were married on March 3, 2018 in New York City.

== Filmography ==
=== Film ===
Year	Film	Role	Notes
1995	Kids	Telly	
1998	Another Day in Paradise	Guard at Reverend's Gate	
2000	7-Teen Sips	Julian Shaffer	
2000	Take It to the Limit	Rick	
2000	King of the Korner	Monty	
2001	Bully	Derek Kaufman	
2001	Last Ball	Scooter	
2001	Storytelling	Marcus	
2001	Bubble Boy	Todd	
2001	Serendipity	Leasing Office Temp	
2002	Personal Velocity: Three Portraits	Mylert	
2002	City of Ghosts		Uncredited
2003	Justice	The Egg Machine	
2003	Blind Horizon	Sterling	
2004	Jumbo Girl	Cooney's Little Brother	Short film
2004	Nausea II	Male Porn Star	
2004	Fearless		TV film
2005	The Girl from Monday	William	
2006	Fay Grim	Carl Fogg	
2007	On the Road with Judas	Francis	
2007	How to Rob a Bank (and 10 Tips to Actually Get Away with It)	Gunman	
2008	El Camino	Elliot	
2008	Lovely, Still	Pharmacist	
2009	Winter of Frozen Dreams	Detective Couture	
2009	A NY Thing	Nick	TV film
2010	Ginger	Kidnapper	Short film
2010	Knowledgy		Short film
2011	Totally for Teens	Mookie	Short film
2011	Being Henry	Henry	Short film
2012	Some Guy Who Kills People	Irv	
2012	Jack & Diane	Joby	Uncredited
2013	Blue Caprice	Land Mine Mark	
2013	American Milkshake	Mr. McCarty	
2013	Doomsdays	Bruho	
2013	Cold Comes the Night	Donnie from Cincinnati	
2014	The Mend	Michael	
2014	A Piece of the Bottom	Abe	Short film
2015	Red Right Return	Cullen	
2015	Saturday Night Cosmic Breakdown	Otis	Short film
2015	Addiction: A 60's Love Story	Black Rich	
2016	Pee-wee's Big Holiday	Abe	
2016	The Drowning	Angus MacDonald	
2016	Goldbricks in Bloom	Otis	
2018	Hover	Jason	
2019	Billboard	Ronny	

=== Music videos ===
Year	Title	Artist	Role
2015	She's Not Me	Jenny Lewis	Velda Plendor/Wilderness Girl

=== Television ===
Year	Series	Role	Notes
2000	The Practice	Darryl Hutchins	Episode: "Checkmates"
2002–2004	The Wire	Johnny Weeks	Recurring role, 14 episodes
2004	Law & Order: Criminal Intent	Rickie 'Chops' Cozza	Episode: "Fico Di Capo"
2005	Carnivàle	Ern	Episodes: "Ingram, TX" & "Old Cherry Blossom Road"
2005–2007	My Name Is Earl	Sonny	Recurring role, 4 episodes
2007	The Kill Point	Mr. Mouse/Michael	Series regular, 8 episodes
2010	Sons of Anarchy	Shepard	Episodes: "The Push" & "Lochan Mor"
2010	Burn Notice	Ted Seyers	Episode: "Dead or Alive"
2011	Totally for Teens	Mookie	Failed Television pilot
2011–2014	The Heart, She Holler	The Reverend	Series regular, 19 episodes
2012	Blue Bloods	Leo Packer	Episode: "Mother's Day"
2013	Banshee	McTeague	Episode: "The Kindred"
2013	As Da Art World Might Turn	Sholeva Sure	3 episodes
2015	Broad City	Timothy	Episode: "St. Mark's"
2015	Gotham	Joe Pike	Episodes: "Scarification" & "By Fire"
2016	Law & Order: Special Victims Unit	Gerald Loomis	Episode: "Sheltered Outcasts"
2018	Maniac	Lance	Miniseries, 2 episodes
2019	At Home with Amy Sedaris	Pudge	Episodes: "Hospital-Tality" & "Game Night"
2021	Teenage Euthanasia	Normal Guy	Episode: "Nobody Beats the Baba"
