= Strike Force (Gotham) =

- Gotham episode
- Episode no.: Season 2 Episode 4
- Directed by: TJ Scott
- Written by: Danny Cannon
- Production code: 4X6204
- Original air date: October 12, 2015

Guest appearances
- Anthony Carrigan as Victor Zsasz; Chelsea Spack as Kristen Kringle; Natalie Alyn Lind as Silver St. Cloud; Saundra Santiago as Janice Caulfield; Michael Mulheren as Randall Hobbs; Lenny Platt as Luke Garrett; Paulina Singer as Josie Mac; Danny Johnson as Gus Freeman; Lucas Salvagno as Sal Martinez; Ian Quinlan as Carl Pinkney; Carol Kane as Gertrude Kapelput

Episode chronology
| ← Previous "The Last Laugh" | Next → "Scarification" |
- Gotham season 2

"Strike Force" is the fourth episode of the second season and 26th episode overall from the FOX series Gotham. The episode was written by Danny Cannon and directed by TJ Scott. It was first broadcast by FOX on October 12, 2015. In this episode, a new commissioner of GCPD, Nathaniel Barnes, decides to create an elite unit called "Strike Force" to take down the criminals and crooked people efficiently. Meanwhile, Penguin gets caught up in business deal by Theo Galavan, while Nygma asks Kringle for a date.

== Plot ==
Nathaniel Barnes (Michael Chiklis), the new captain of the GCPD, arrives with the goal of cleaning up the police department and the city's corruption. With the help of Gordon, whom he makes his new second-in-command, Barnes recruits several aspiring police trainees from the Police Academy in order to form an alpha team strike force to help set his goal into motion.

With Mayor Aubrey James still missing from the public and Deputy Mayor Harrison Kane dead, Councillor Janice Caulfield (Saundra Santiago) and teamster boss Randall Hobbs (Michael Mulheren) begin to run for office as a new mayor election begins. Theo Galavan kidnaps Cobblepot's mother and blackmails Cobblepot into murdering all of the candidates so that Theo can run for office unchallenged. After Cobblepot kills Janice Caulfield, Randall Hobbs escapes death at the hands of Victor Zsasz with the help of the GCPD strike force.

When Selina Kyle begins looking for Bruce at his prep school, she is warned by Alfred to stay away from Bruce after what she did to Reggie. Shortly afterwards, Bruce meets with Theo to thank him for saving his life. During the meeting, Bruce has an encounter with Theo's niece, Silver St. Cloud (Natalie Alyn Lind), and is informed by Galavan that Cloud will be attending his school. After agreeing to go on a date with Edward Nygma (Cory Michael Smith), Kristen Kringle (Chelsea Spack) and Nygma bond in a romantic encounter. Gordon attempts to confront Cobblepot about the killings but Cobblepot reminds him of the killing he has done while working for him and drives him away.

As Cobblepot begins to have Butch Gilzean search for the location of his mother, Captain Nathaniel Barnes informs the strike force that Cobblepot will be their next target.

== Reception ==
=== Ratings ===
The episode was watched by 4.17 million viewers. This was a decrease in viewership from the previous episode, which was watched by 4.33 million viewers. This made Gotham the most watched program of the day in FOX, beating Minority Report.

=== Critical reviews ===
"Rise of the Villains: Strike Force" received mixed reviews from critics. The episode received a rating of 58% with an average score of 6.5 out of 10 on the review aggregator Rotten Tomatoes, with the site's consensus stating: "Many of Gotham's characters take a promising step forward in 'Strike Force,' but the tone is uncomfortably akin to the most dour and overly simplistic episodes of season one."

Matt Fowler of IGN gave the episode a "good" 7.5 out of 10 and wrote in his verdict: "I have nothing against Michael Chiklis' performance here, or his character's hard-line stance on corruption (or his idea to give Gordon a squad of rookies to command). If anyone can bark loudly and back it up, it's Chiklis. But how has Barns existed within the ranks of the GCPD the way that it is? The way that it was established to be back in Season 1 when Gordon was notable as being the only honest detective on the beat? Meanwhile, Penguin had some good moments to play here. He went from being on top of the world to having that world totally ransacked. Sure, his moments with his mother stand as some of Season 1's silliest, most wasteful scenes, but the loss of her worked really well here. As did his screams right at the end."

The A.V. Club's Kyle Fowle gave the episode a "C−" grade and wrote, "It's the jarring tone that's the biggest problem, and it's something that Gotham has never managed to shake. Perhaps it's just part of the show's DNA, but it's strange to see Gotham do everything it can to become more gritty while also pumping out cartoonish dialogue and performances. For instance, much of the episode centers on Barnes and his creation of a special task force to clean up Gotham and deal with the new threats that have come as a result of the Arkham breakout. It’s a narrative choice that’s meant to feel consequential, and yet it left me cold, and also outright laughing at some of the dialogue. The creation of the strike force, spearheaded by Barnes but put under the command of Gordon, is so overcooked, so laden with military imagery and chest-beating bravado that it feels completely at odds with everything else going on in Gotham. This is an episode where Butch is a consistent comedic presence, death and murder scenes are scored by silly, jangly piano-and-horn tunes, and Nygma talks to himself over and over again, and yet the show plays the Strike Force storyline with a straight face. It’s baffling, and more than anything contributes to an overall feeling of haphazardness, meaning that 'Rise Of The Villains: Strike Force' lacks any sort of tonal or narrative cohesion.
