= Scarification (Gotham) =

- Gotham episode
- Episode no.: Season 2 Episode 5
- Directed by: Bill Eagles
- Written by: Jordan Harper
- Production code: 4X6205
- Original air date: October 19, 2015

Guest appearances
- Michael Potts as Sid Bunderslaw; Chelsea Spack as Kristen Kringle; Leo Fitzpatrick as Joe Pike; Michelle Veintimilla as Bridgit Pike; Lenny Platt as Luke Garrett; Paulina Singer as Josie Mac; Lucas Salvagno as Sal Martinez; Ian Quinlan as Carl Pinkney; Noah Robbins as Evan Pike; Mary Joy as Edwige; Ron Rifkin as Father Creel; Sophie Lee Morris as Celestine Wayne; Bryan Howard Conner as Caleb Dumas; Brian S. Carpenter as Jonathan Wayne

Episode chronology
| ← Previous "Strike Force" | Next → "By Fire" |
- Gotham season 2

"Scarification" is the fifth episode of the second season and 27th episode overall from the FOX series Gotham. The episode was written by Jordan Harper and directed by Bill Eagles. It was first broadcast in October 19, 2015 in FOX. In this episode, the alliance between Galavan and Cobblepot needs the help of a group of family arsonists. Cobblepot then discovers the reason behind Galavan's intentions.

The episode was watched by 4.19 million viewers, a slight improvement over the last episode and received positive reviews with critics commenting on Firefly's introduction and Galavan's intentions.

== Plot ==
Cobblepot (Robin Lord Taylor) and Butch (Drew Powell) bring a chest to Galavan (James Frain) in his penthouse, revealing a kidnapped Sid Bunderslaw (Michael Potts), where Tabitha (Jessica Lucas) removes one of his eyes.

Meanwhile, the GCPD Strike Force, led by Captain Barnes (Michael Chiklis) and Gordon (Ben McKenzie) busts one of Cobblepot's money laundering houses, where they're nearly killed by a man with a rocket-propelled grenade. Galavan arrives at the GCPD, where he offers help in cleaning the GCPD's corruption in exchange for support in his candidacy. Gordon gently refuses, claiming the police and politics don't match. Tabitha visits Cobblepot to discuss their next move, which requires hiring arsonists.

Butch contacts Selina (Camren Bicondova), who puts him in contact with a group of arsonists, the Pike Brothers: Joe (Leo Fitzpatrick), Cale and Evan (Noah Robbins), who are still loyal to Fish Mooney. They visit them, hiring them to work for Galavan and Cobblepot. Selina also discovers they abuse of their sister, Bridgit (Michelle Veintimilla), a friend from her childhood. Evan goes to a market to buy equipment but the place is raided by the GCPD. He tries to escape, climbing a chainlink fence but Gordon stops him. When he tries to reach for his gun, he is gunned down by Gordon, and is also blown up for hiding an explosive in his pants. Nygma (Cory Michael Smith) invites Gordon and Lee (Morena Baccarin) for a double date with him and Kringle (Chelsea Spack), although Gordon is hesitant. Both Gordon and Lee are surprised at Nygma's relaxed mood during the date and how steady his relationship with Kringle seems to be.

After Evan's death, the Pike brothers force Bridgit to replace Evan's position, threatening to send her to a brothel. They make Bridgit infiltrate a Wayne Enterprises building where, using Bunderslaw's eye, opens a vault containing an ancient knife. Cobblepot later contacts the owner of an antique shop, Edwige (Mary Joy), to tell him the truth about the knife. She reveals that in the 19th century, five families ruled the high council of Gotham: Elliot, Kane, Crown, Dumas and the Waynes. During a party, Caleb Dumas (Bryan Howard Conner) allegedly abused Celestine Wayne (Sophie Lee Morris). Part of his arm was then cut for punishment by Celestine's brother, Jonathan (Brian S. Carpenter) with the same knife. The Dumas were then exiled to a religious sect, their properties belonged to the Waynes, erasing them from history and forced to change their surname to Galavan. Cobblepot then formulates a facade with Butch to fake allegiance with Galavan for thinking Cobblepot is conspiring with him, and to make it work, Cobblepot cuts off Butch's hand.

Gordon and Bullock (Donal Logue) ambush Bridgit on a would-be robbery, where their brothers abandon her. While she tries to back off, officer Luke Garrett (Lenny Platt) tries to restrain her, but she accidentally burns him down. She escapes with Selina but Officer Garrett later dies from the fire. Galavan again visits the GCPD, where Gordon decides to support on his candidacy. In his penthouse, Galavan is visited by Father Creel (Ron Rifkin), who hands him the knife, claiming his warriors are on the way, and Bruce Wayne will die.

== Reception ==
=== Ratings ===
The episode was watched by 4.19 million viewers. This was an increase in viewership from the previous episode, which was watched by 4.17 million viewers. This made Gotham the most watched program of the day in FOX, beating Minority Report.

=== Critical reviews ===
"Rise of the Villains: Scarification" received mixed to positive reviews from critics. The episode received a rating of 62% with an average score of 5.5 out of 10 on the review aggregator Rotten Tomatoes, with the site's consensus stating: "'Scarification' suffers from an overabundance of plot points, but the episode's attention-getting acts of violence hint at more compelling developments to follow."

Matt Fowler of IGN gave the episode a "good" 7.3 out of 10 and wrote in his verdict: "There wasn't anything egregiously wrong with 'Scarification' except that it felt like the show was backsliding a bit. Supposedly, the 'cases of the week' are gone but this episode sort of proved that you can't fully leave that aspect of the show behind. Yes, this week's case tied into a 'future' DC villain, but it also worked to take our heroes even further away from the main conspiracy. They're now three times removed from the main plot. Anyhow, I feel like the Firefly stuff will have to get more intense, and therefore more interesting, next week in the second half of the arc. Just given the sort of character Bridgit is supposed to wind up becoming down the road."

The A.V. Club's Kyle Fowle gave the episode a "D" grade and wrote, "'Scarification' is Gotham in a nutshell, an episode that's narratively scattered and consistently uninterested in moving along meaningful and engaging plotlines, and also deepening the show's ever-expanding roster of characters."
