= A Dead Man Feels No Cold =

- Gotham episode
- Episode no.: Season 2 Episode 13
- Directed by: Eagle Egilsson
- Written by: Seth Boston
- Production code: 4X6213
- Original air date: March 7, 2016

Guest appearances
- B. D. Wong as Dr. Hugo Strange; Tonya Pinkins as Ethel Peabody; Nathan Darrow as Victor Fries/Mr. Freeze; Kristen Hager as Nora Fries; Ian Quinlan as Carl Pinkney

Episode chronology
← Previous "Mr. Freeze"	Next → "This Ball of Mud and Meanness"
- Gotham season 2

"A Dead Man Feels No Cold" is the thirteenth episode of the second season, and 35th episode overall from the FOX series Gotham. It was written by new series writer Seth Boston and directed by Eagle Egilsson and first broadcast on March 7, 2016, on FOX. In the episode, Jim Gordon and Harvey Bullock continue their quest to stop Victor Fries, now dubbed "Mr. Freeze" by the media, with the help of his wife, Nora.

The episode was watched by 4.54 million viewers, and received critical acclaim, with critics praising David Mazouz's and Nathan Darrow's performances and Hugo Strange's intentions.

== Plot ==
Gordon (Ben McKenzie) leads a raid into Ace Chemicals, the company that Victor Fries (Nathan Darrow) uses for his weapon supplies. Inside the factory, they discover multiple frozen cops, a guard was kidnapped by Fries and a canister is missing with a message reading "free my wife", carved in a wall. At Wayne Manor, Bruce (David Mazouz) is visited by Lee (Morena Baccarin) where she tries to help him with his trauma after his assassination attempt, but Bruce reveals he felt alive and plans on continuing to try to find his parents' murderer.

In the GCPD, Barnes (Michael Chiklis) learns that Nora's (Kristen Hager) health has worsened. Realizing hospital general population would be dangerous for civilians as Fries would try to rescue her, he decides to transfer her to the Arkham Asylum hospital and use her as bait. Hugo Strange (B. D. Wong) is notified of this by Ethel Peabody (Tonya Pinkins) and decides to use this as a way to recruit Fries for Indian Hill.

Fries finds out about Nora's transfer and while discussing it with the bound and gagged kidnapped guard, he throws a device in the ocean, causing it to freeze. Meanwhile, Oswald Cobblepot (Robin Lord Taylor) is used for experimentation in Arkham Asylum and then wakes to find himself playing a recreational game with the other inmates. The GCPD arrive and close down Arkham to stop Fries from entering. Gordon runs into Cobblepot as he is dragged away and ignores his pleas for help, which makes Cobblepot shout Gordon was the one who killed Theo Galavan, something that is witnessed by Strange. Lee takes Nora to the hospital ward, where she discovers a comatose Barbara (Erin Richards).

In Wayne Manor, Bruce is confronted by Alfred (Sean Pertwee) for his methods and is finally given the information of the man who killed his parents: Patrick "Matches" Malone. He plans on finding him and killing him, but Alfred makes him promise that, come the time, he'll let Alfred kill him. Selina (Camren Bicondova) later visits him and Bruce wants her to get him a gun to kill Malone. Fries sends a man with frozen limbs to drive a bus into Arkham so he can break through a wall in a new suit while the police are distracted. Gordon, Bullock (Donal Logue) and the Strike Force charge through the hallways, but Strange closes multiple gates, but Gordon slips through in enough time to reach the hospital ward. Fries encounters the electroshock chair room and Strange talks to him through a monitor, stating that he will give him a car so he and Nora can escape if Fries leaves a cryogenic cartridge. He leaves behind a cartridge and takes the keys to the car.

Fries arrives at the hospital ward and makes Lee assist Nora and leave with him, before trapping Gordon in a closet. He then escapes with them to his home. In the basement, Nora urges Lee to realize Fries is not a bad man and feeling guilt for not stopping him earlier, Nora, unknown to Lee, changes the cartridge from Fries' gun to one of the earlier, faulty cartridges. Fries then finally freezes Nora, but the process unfortunately tears her apart. Discovering that Nora changed the cartridge, he lets Lee go and decides to commit suicide by freezing himself to death.

Fries' body is transferred to Arkham Asylum, and although reported as "dead", he wakes up in a room with bright white hair and blue eyes. Strange visits him, stating the room is designed to accommodate his severe hypothermia so he can survive, otherwise he would die as any temperature above freezing will cause him to overheat. Strange guesses that Fries absorbed multiple doses of formula as he worked on them, and his cells underwent a change when he tried to kill himself. He also tells him they designed a new suit for him and that they would begin work later. Strange later passes a room filled with multiple corpses in tanks, including Theo Galavan, Jerome Valeska, and Fish Mooney.

== Production ==
The episode was written by series' writers assistant Seth Boston, his first writing credit for a series. Boston is the fourth alumnus from creator Bruno Heller's show The Mentalist in having worked on the show, as Ken Woodruff, Jordan Harper and Rebecca Perry Cutter have all written for The Mentalist with Boston working as a production assistant in the show.

== Reception ==
=== Viewers ===
The episode was watched by 4.54 million viewers with a 1.5/5 share among adults aged 18 to 49. This was an increase in viewership from the previous episode, which was watched by 4.12 million viewers. With this ratings, Gotham was the most-watched program of the day in FOX, beating out Lucifer, the 17th most watched of the week in the 18-49 demographics and the 45th most watched overall in the week.

With Live+7 DVR viewing factored in, the episode had an overall rating of 6.77 million viewers, and a 2.5 in the 18–49 demographic.

=== Critical reviews ===
Professional ratings
Review scores
Source	Rating
Rotten Tomatoes (Tomatometer)	90%
Rotten Tomatoes (Average Score)	8.2
IGN	7.4
The A.V. Club	B−
TV Fanatic	4.4/5 stars
TV Overmind	4/5 stars
Lyles Movie Files	8.5

"Wrath of the Villains: A Dead Man Feels No Cold" received critical acclaim from critics. The episode received a rating of 90% with an average score of 8.2 out of 10 on the review aggregator Rotten Tomatoes with the consensus stating: "'Dead Men Feel No Cold' proves a satisfying, if melancholy, outing for Mr. Freeze as Gotham continues its descent into mayhem at the hands of Hugo Strange".

Matt Fowler of IGN gave the episode a "good" 7.4 out of 10 and wrote in his verdict, "'A Dead Man Feels No Cold' gave us a very Gotham-style origin story for Mr. Freeze. A rampage, a manhunt, a (somewhat) sympathetic villain, and an accident. Or, in this case, an accidental non-suicide with terrible side effects. At least Hugo Strange was around to sabotage the cops, spy on Gordon, and welcome Freeze to his underground lair of monsters."

The A.V. Club's Kyle Fowle gave the episode a "B−" grade and wrote, "'Wrath Of The Villains: A Dead Man Feels No Cold' is really just an extension of last week's winter premiere, as if Gotham filmed a two-hour premiere and then chopped it into two equal halves. What that means is that this episode would almost work better if it were paired with last week's because it manages to flesh out a few more plot details that were suspiciously absent in the premiere. 'A Dead Man Feels No Cold' takes the time to check in on Bruce Wayne and his search for his parents' killer while also completing its version of the Mr. Freeze origin story."

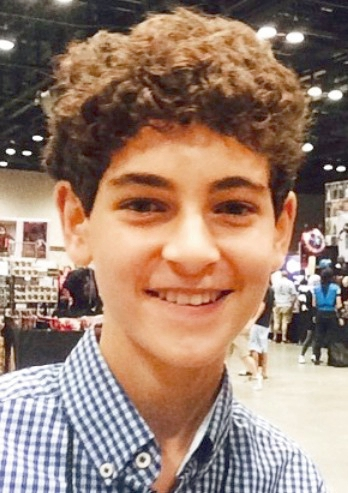
David Mazouz brief performance in the episode was praised by critics as his next step to become Batman.

Maryann Sleasman of TV.com praised the episode stating, "'A Dead Man Feels No Cold' was dark — one of the darkest episodes Gotham has aired. Even the comedic moments with the great Oswald Cobblepot reduced to playing children's games with his wacky roomies were sufficiently depraved enough to silence the laughter. 'I'm not a goose, I'm a penguin,' was not the righteous indignation of one of Gotham's most brilliant underworld princes, but the disjointed ramblings of a man who knew that somewhere inside, he's something special, dangerous, and powerful; but can't figure out how or why he needed to articulate it."

Andy Behbakht of TV Overmind gave the series a star rating of 4 out of 5, writing "Overall, despite some pacing issues that can get problematic later in the season, 'A Dead Man Feels No Cold' was a strong episode, that again, made me forgot about Leslie, Bullock and Jim at many points throughout it. I did appreciate the side-plot with Bruce as he continues to develop into the man we know he will become one day." Robert Yaniz, Jr., writing for ScreenRant also praised the episode: "In this respect, this second episode of 2016 certainly marked the end of a particularly chilling (pun intended) two-parter and revealed the most blatant hint yet at what viewers can expect in the coming weeks."

Keertana Sastry of EW reacted positive about Darrow, stating: "The rise of Mr. Freeze is officially upon us. Yes, it's true that we have already been introduced to Victor Fries, but if the events of 'A Dead Man Feels No Cold' teach us anything, it's that Fries' 'death' means that Mr. Freeze has truly been born." The Baltimore Sun wrote positively about the episode, stating: "Usually 'Gotham' focuses on the troubles from the hero's or the villain's perspective. But in 'A Dead Man Feels No Cold,' it took a break from the usual guts and gore to humanize the usually good guys and not-always bad guys. To do so, the show turned to the supporting ladies and showed how the double lives the men lead can devastate and alienate their significant others. It was surprising and much-welcomed change." Lisa Babick from TV Fanatic highlighted David Mazouz's performance in the episode, stating "Bruce took one huge step forward in his journey to become Batman."
