= Tonight's the Night (Gotham) =

- Gotham episode
- Episode no.: Season 2 Episode 8
- Directed by: Jeffrey Hunt
- Written by: Jim Barnes
- Production code: 4X6208
- Original air date: November 9, 2015

Guest appearances
- Richard Kind as Mayor Aubrey James; Natalie Alyn Lind as Silver St. Cloud; Ian Quinlan as Carl Pinkney

Episode chronology
← Previous "Mommy's Little Monster"	Next → "A Bitter Pill to Swallow"
- Gotham season 2

"Tonight's the Night" is the eighth episode of the second season and 30th episode overall from the FOX series Gotham. The episode was written by Jim Barnes and directed by Jeffrey Hunt. It was first broadcast in November 9, 2015 in FOX. In the episode, Galavan sends Barbara after Jim Gordon, while trying to make a business deal with Bruce Wayne. Nygma has a run-in with Oswald Cobblebot.

== Plot ==
The episode starts with Barbara (Erin Richards) having a dream about her wedding rehearsal with Gordon (Benjamin McKenzie). The priest turns out to be Cobblepot (Robin Lord Taylor), Galavan (James Frain) playing the organ, and the attendees become Arkham Asylum's escapees. Everyone, even Gordon, begins laughing at her. She then gets tied to a pew while she watches Gordon and Leslie (Morena Baccarin) in her wedding dress and everyone aiming their guns at her. She wakes up from the nightmare, where she receives a wrapped gift from Galavan. Galavan then tells Barbara that it's time to develop his plan for Bruce (David Mazouz) and gives her permission to kill Gordon.

Gordon tries to prove to Captain Barnes (Michael Chiklis) that the escape from Arkham Asylum, the massacre at GCPD, and the gala shooting were organised by Galavan. Barnes is skeptical and demands proof. Barbara then appears at the GCPD and turns herself in. During the interrogation, Barbara breaks into tears and Gordon persuades her by kissing her while Leslie, Barnes and Bullock watch from behind the two-way mirror. Barbara leads Gordon and Bullock (Donal Logue) to a location but, as they suspected, it's an ambush, and their car is hit by a truck. There's a firefight between the strike squad shadowing them and Galavan's henchmen, and Gordon's taken hostage.

Meanwhile, Nygma (Cory Michael Smith) buries Kristen Kringle (Chelsea Spack)'s body in the woods. Soon, a hunter runs across him and accidentally finds Kringle's corpse, forcing Nygma to kill him and bury him too. Galavan meets with Bruce in his penthouse and makes a deal with him: in exchange for Bruce selling Wayne Enterprises to Galavan, Galavan will give him the information on the man who killed his parents. Gordon wakes up in Gotham Cathedral, tied to a chair, wearing a tuxedo, in the presence of a priest and with many hostages in the pews. Barbara appears, in her wedding dress and with sawed-off shotgun in hand. While Barbara confronts Gordon, Tabitha (Jessica Lucas) brings in Leslie, tied to a wheelchair. Gordon's gets Barbara to reveal the location of Mayor James on China Dock.

Bullock, listening to a tape of Barbara and Jim's conversation before the ambush, realizes the location of Gordon and Leslie and tells Barnes. Barbara tries to tear Jim and Leslie apart by telling Leslie about the assassination of Odgen Barker he committed as a favor to Cobblepot, but Leslie already knew as Gordon had told her. Gordon frees himself and gets Barbara's gun. Tabitha and her crew arrive, but Gordon kills her crew and injures her in the shoulder. The police arrive and Barbara escapes to the organ loft, where Gordon follows her. They briefly fight and Barbara crashes through the church's stained glass window with Barbara hanging from Gordon's hand. Barbara says she loves him, lets go her hand and falls from the window, to Gordon's horror.

Barbara survives the fall and is taken to the hospital. Gordon and the strike force go to the docks where they discover Mayor James and reveal Galavan's involvement. Bruce and Alfred (Sean Pertwee) reunite with Galavan in his penthouse to close the deal. At the last minute, Bruce declines the offer. Just then, Gordon and the strike force arrive and arrest Galavan for his involvement in Mayor James's abduction, but not before Galavan throws into the fire the information about the Waynes' killer, to Bruce's disbelief. Back in the woods, Nygma discovers Cobblepot in a camper, wounded, and asking Nygma for help.

== Reception ==
=== Ratings ===
The episode was watched by 4.11 million viewers. This was a decrease in viewership from the previous episode, which was watched by 4.27 million viewers. This made Gotham the most watched program of the day on FOX.

=== Critical reviews ===
"Rise of the Villains: Tonight's the Night" received positive reviews from critics. The episode received a rating of 71% with an average score of 6.6 out of 10 on the review aggregator Rotten Tomatoes, with the site's consensus stating: "'Tonight's the Night' reaps some delightfully demented narrative seeds sown earlier in the season, albeit slightly at the expense of sound narrative structure and character development."

Matt Fowler of IGN gave the episode a "good" 7.7 out of 10 and wrote in his verdict, "'Tonight's the Night' had a really cool Barbara story, marred by the weird non-death ending. If they wanted to keep her alive, there were certainly other ways to do it other than the one way that made her death almost necessary by design. Also, and this is more of an observation than a negative, the Se7en homages were pretty out of control during the first 15, 20 minutes. Barbara turning herself in. Offering to lead Jim and Harvey away on an escort mission (followed by armored cops). It's just that instead of the box, it was a church. And a dress. And also a kidnapped Leslie. Other than that, the best stuff this week belonged to Bruce and Alfred."

The A.V. Club's Kyle Fowle gave the episode a "B" grade and wrote, "'Tonight’s The Night' is an episode that deals with various stages of crumbling loyalty and ambition. It sees Gordon, Barbara, and Bruce all contemplate and reckon with past choices and seemingly inevitable, sad futures. 'Tonight’s The Night' is nuanced doom and gloom that also never stops being fun, and really, that's what Gotham should be.
