= The Last Laugh (Gotham) =

- Gotham episode
- Episode no.: Season 2 Episode 3
- Directed by: Eagle Egilsson
- Written by: John Stephens
- Production code: 4X6203
- Original air date: October 5, 2015

Guest appearances
- Cameron Monaghan as Jerome Valeska; Mark Margolis as Paul Cicero; Norm Lewis as Deputy Mayor Harrison Kane

Episode chronology
| ← Previous "Knock, Knock" | Next → "Strike Force" |
- Gotham season 2

"The Last Laugh" is the third episode of the second season and 25th episode overall from the FOX series Gotham. The episode was written by John Stephens and directed by Eagle Egilsson. It was first broadcast on October 5, 2015, in FOX.

In this episode, in the aftermath of the GCPD massacre, Gordon and Bullock begin looking for Jerome Valeska. Meanwhile, Galavan plans his next move at a gala trying to act as a "hero" to the public.

The episode was watched by 4.33 million viewers but received mixed-to-positive reviews with critics debating whether the plot twist was surprising or disappointing.

== Plot ==
With the GCPD recovering from the massacre and death of Commissioner Essen, Gordon (Benjamin McKenzie) and Bullock (Donal Logue) start questioning people on the street for info on Jerome (Cameron Monaghan) and goes to Paul Cicero (Mark Margolis) to know on his son's whereabouts, unaware that Jerome and Tabitha (Jessica Lucas) have already captured and held Paul hostage in his own apartment. Paul reveals to Jerome that he'll be a curse upon Gotham and that his legacy will be death and madness before Jerome kills him. When Gordon and Bullock discovered Cicero's corpse, Jerome's sleeping gas knocks out Bullock and Gordon is kicked in the face by Tabitha, allowing her and Jerome to escape.

Elsewhere, Theo Galavan (James Frain) reveals the next stage of his plan as Barbara (Erin Richards) had a romantic encounter with Tabitha. Galavan states his family built Gotham and that he will get revenge on those who stole the credit for doing so. Bruce (David Mazouz) and Alfred (Sean Pertwee) attend the Gotham Children's Hospital Gala and run into Leslie (Morena Baccarin). Having no idea Leslie is in a relationship with Gordon, Alfred flirts with her. Bruce later encounters Selina, who claims she is "working." As part of Galavan's plan, Jerome and Barbara disguise themselves and take over the show. Leslie recognizes them and tries to call Gordon, but is kidnapped by one of Galavan's henchmen.

When assistant Deputy Mayor Kane (Norm Lewis) is called to the stage, Jerome throws a knife to his chest and reveals himself and Barbara, holding everyone hostage. Galavan comes and tries playing hero, demanding that Jerome and Barbara stop, until Barbara pretends to knock him out with a mallet. As Bruce and Selina are about to leave, Bruce tells Selina he misses her, and goes back to save Alfred.

While Jerome intimidates the hostages, Barbara ties Leslie to a spinning wheel, but Leslie kicks Barbara in the crotch, prompting Barbara to retaliate by trying to stab Leslie, but Jerome stops her.

Jerome threatens to kill Alfred unless Bruce gets on the stage. Unwilling to let his only family die, Bruce gets on the stage, and Jerome holds a knife to his neck until Jim and Alfred start shooting the henchmen. Jerome tries to kill Bruce but Galavan, regaining consciousness, betrays Jerome and stabs him in the neck, killing him and making Galavan look like a hero in front of the public. Barbara escapes through a trap door on the stage.

Bullock confronts Oswald Cobblepot (Robin Lord Taylor) about the rumors circulating that Gordon did a favor for him, but Cobblepot denies it. Bullock tells the self-proclaimed "King of Gotham" that he still sees Cobblepot as the umbrella boy he and Gordon first met, and threatens to beat him if he goes after Gordon again, and he still wants revenge for Fish's death. Alfred tries to flirt with Leslie again only for him to realize that she is with Gordon. Disappointed, he gets annoyed at Bruce, thinking he knew, which Bruce denies.

Back at their hideout, Barbara kisses Galavan on the cheek, while a jealous Tabitha watches. Although Jerome is dead, people became inspired by his sadistic and clever nature, and it gets to the point where people start committing homicidal acts of their own while also mimicking Jerome's laugh, proving Cicero's prediction is true. The last shot shows Jerome's smiling corpse with his laughter echoing in the background.

== Production ==
=== Development ===
On killing Jerome, showrunner Bruno Heller talked in an interview for ComicBook.com: "We always knew, it's one of those things, when we saw Cameron's performance and how brilliant he was, there was a moment of 'oh hell, this guy is genius!' But we had a storyline that has to go how it has to go, otherwise it'd be cheating. So to that degree, there was some second guessing that 'oh hell, we're losing this brilliant young actor".

In another interview, Cameron Monaghan talked about his character getting killed: "In many ways the episode is, at least it was for me, a love letter to the character and to 75 years of the character in that it's an acknowledgment that there's something about this personality that is infectious and seductive. It sticks in your brain in a way that it just lodges in there and it can burrow its way into a popular consciousness — obviously the character of the Joker has. So we see a reflection of that in that this man, this personality, it ripples across the city in some meaningful way. That's what it was for me, at least".

=== Writing ===
When asked about Jerome returning, writer John Stephens stated that "if you watch the episodes closely, as they go forward this year you'll start seeing the seeds of the way that story will continue to develop. And we probably have not seen the last of that fellow".

== Reception ==
=== Ratings ===
The episode was watched by 4.33 million viewers. This was a decrease in viewership from the previous episode, which was watched by 4.65 million viewers. This made Gotham the most watched program of the day in FOX, beating Minority Report.

=== Critical reviews ===
Professional ratings
Review scores
| Source | Rating |
|---|---|
| Rotten Tomatoes (Tomatometer) | 64% |
| Rotten Tomatoes (Average Score) | 6.1 |
| IGN | 8.0 |
| The A.V. Club | C+ |
| Paste Magazine | 8.0 |
| TV Fanatic | 3/5 stars |
| The Young Folks | 8.5/10 |
| JoBlo | 9/10 |
| PopMatters | 6/10 stars |

"Rise of the Villains: The Last Laugh" received generally positive reviews from critics. The episode received a rating of 64% with an average score of 6.1 out of 10 on the review aggregator Rotten Tomatoes, with the site's consensus stating: "Gotham successfully delivers on a fun origin story, even if the big twist at the end of "The Last Laugh" feels unearned."

Matt Fowler of IGN gave the episode a "great" 8.0 out of 10 and wrote in his verdict: "'The Last Laugh,' while kicking things off with a gala premise that one really needed to stretch in order to believe, got more right than it did wrong. And it gave us a very fun, over-the-top Joker/Harley dynamic in the form of Jerome and Barbara's hostage plot. Jerome being menacing-yet-controlling while Barbara was more spontaneous and prone to emotion (especially after Leslie kicked her). Barbara's new relationship with Tabitha fits her flighty, craziness, though I don't know how up I am for a whole sibling jealousy story to take root given how little we know, at this point, about the Galavans."

The A.V. Club's Kyle Fowle gave the episode a "C+" grade and wrote, "If there's hope here though, it's in the episode's implication that Gordon will eventually have to compromise his ethics to truly clean up Gotham and take down Galavan, even if Gordon doesn't know Theo is the bad guy yet. Still, 'Rise Of The Villains: The Last Laugh' is a troubling crack in this season's otherwise sturdy structure, and it may not be long before everything comes crashing down."
