= Flamingo (comics) =

- Flamingo

Publication information
- Publisher: DC Comics
- First appearance: Batman #666 (July 2007)
- Created by: Grant Morrison (writer); Frank Quitely (artist)

In-story information
- Alter ego: Eduardo Flamingo
- Species: Human
- Place of origin: Earth
- Team affiliations: Secret Society of Super Villains
- Abilities: Firearms expert

Flamingo (Eduardo Flamingo) is a supervillain appearing in American comic books published by DC Comics, commonly as an adversary of Batman.

The character appeared on the second season of Gotham, portrayed by Raúl Castillo.

== Publication history ==
Flamingo first appeared in Batman #666 (July 2007) and was created by Grant Morrison and Frank Quitely.

== Fictional character biography ==
Eduardo Flamingo is an emotionless, unfeeling pink-wearing flamboyant killer who has a tendency to eat his victim's faces after he has murdered them. Jason Todd (the second Robin, who had become Red Hood) has rallied a defense against Flamingo, but sustains bullet wounds to the face and kneecap. Flamingo then turns his attentions to Red Hood's partner Scarlet. Flamingo then tugs at the seams of Scarlet's mask before she gashes him with one of her blades. Feeling responsible for the girl and her condition, Robin jumps into the fray to help, but is shot in the spine, paralyzing him from the waist down. Dick Grayson (who is operating as Batman) delivers a boot to Flamingo's face. When Dick is nearly tossed over the side of the building, Jason uses a construction digger to scoop Flamingo up and deposit him over the edge, sending him plummeting to the ground below.

In The New 52 continuity reboot, Flamingo is first seen among the villainous inmates at Arkham Asylum. He joins the inmates and is seen attacking Batman before Joker (who is actually Nightwing in disguise) appears to come to Batman's aid.

During the "Forever Evil" storyline, Flamingo appears as a member of the Secret Society of Super Villains.

While Batman is teased by Julia about his romantic failure with Catwoman, he gets distracted when Flamingo's motorcycle skids past him. Batman makes a hurried U-turn and catches up to his prey, running him down, and sending the assassin flying from his bike. He has taken down Flamingo and allows the man to wake in a cemetery. Batman follows Flamingo to the Moffat Building, where he discovers that Catwoman survived an assassination attempt.

In Catwoman #60 (2023), he was shown flirting with a male ballet dancer.

== Powers and abilities ==
Flamingo is a skilled hitman in excellent physical condition. Additionally, he wields a variety of weapons such as chain whips and sub-machine guns and drives a variety of vehicles, the most common being a bright pink motorcycle.

== Other versions ==
A possible future version of Flamingo appears in Batman #666 as an enemy of Damian Wayne / Batman.

== In other media ==
- Flamingo makes a non-speaking cameo appearance in the Batman: The Brave and the Bold episode "The Knights of Tomorrow!".
- Eduardo Flamingo appears in the Gotham episode "A Bitter Pill to Swallow", portrayed by Raúl Castillo. This version is a spike-wielding cannibal and hitman who sees killing as an art form.
