= Firefly (DC Comics) =

Supervillain created by DC Comics

- Garfield Lynns as Firefly in Detective Comics #690 (October 1995). Art by Staz Johnson (pencils), Scott Hanna (inks), and Matt Hollingsworth (colors).

Publication information
- Publisher: DC Comics
- First appearance: Detective Comics #184 (June 1952)
- Created by: France Herron (writer); Dick Sprang (artist)

In-story information
- Alter ego: Garfield Lynns; Ted Carson; Bridgit Pike
- Team affiliations: Secret Society of Super Villains
- Abilities: Expert in pyrotechnics; Thorough knowledge of flammable agents and explosives; Utilizes fireproof battle suit equipped with a flamethrower, various incendiary devices, and a winged jet pack for high-speed flight

Firefly is the alias of several supervillains appearing in American comic books published by DC Comics. Created by writer France Herron and artist Dick Sprang, the first and best-known incarnation of the character, Garfield Lynns, was introduced in Detective Comics #184 (1952). Initially depicted as a gimmicky stock villain who utilized lighting effects to commit crimes, Firefly was later reimagined as a psychopathic pyromaniac with an obsessive compulsion to start fires following Crisis on Infinite Earths' reboot of the DC Universe in the 1980s. This darker version of the character has since endured as one of Batman's most recurring enemies and belongs to the collective of adversaries that make up his central rogues gallery. Other characters have also adopted the Firefly persona, including Ted Carson and Bridgit Pike, an original female incarnation introduced in the television series Gotham who was later integrated into the comics as Carson's protégé Lady Firefly.

The Garfield Lynns incarnation of Firefly has been adapted in various media incarnations, including several shows set within the DC Animated Universe (voiced by Mark Rolston), The Batman animated series (voiced by Jason Marsden), the first season of The CW's live-action Arrowverse television series Arrow (portrayed by Andrew Dunbar), and the Batman: Arkham video game franchise (voiced by Crispin Freeman).

== Fictional character biography ==
=== Pre-Crisis ===
Firefly, as he was originally depicted. Art by Win Mortimer.

Garfield Lynns was a down-and-out film special effects expert whose plan to rob a theater by faking a fire was foiled by Batman and Robin. As Lynns fled the scene, Batman mistook a distant firefly for Lynns' lit cigarette and gave chase in the wrong direction. Lynns saw this as a sign of fate and became the Firefly, a costumed criminal who utilized various lighting effects and optical illusions during heists.

=== Post-Crisis ===
Following the Crisis on Infinite Earths continuity reboot, Firefly is re-imagined as a darker and more violent character.

After being taken away from their abusive parents, Garfield Lynns and his sister, Amanda, grow up at the St. Evangelina orphanage. Unlike his sister, Garfield is a problematic child whom nobody wants to adopt. As an adult, Lynns becomes a pyrotechnics and special effects expert in the film industry before falling victim to poverty and becoming a criminal.

Lynns then becomes a professional arsonist known as "Firefly", and allies with Killer Moth in an attempt to kill Batman and Robin. Their alliance falls apart, however, when Killer Moth realizes Firefly's madness and fears for his own well-being. The two villains are then taken into custody. In Batman: Knightfall (1993), Firefly escapes from Arkham Asylum and attempts to burn all of the places that he lacked the privilege to go to as a child. After successfully destroying a pier and a theater, Firefly is stopped by Batman as he tries to scorch the Gotham Zoo. In his next attempt to burn Gotham to the ground, Firefly is scarred in a chemical explosion and designs a fireproof battle suit to protect himself from further incidents.

During the No Man's Land (1999) story arc, Firefly is one of the inmates at Blackgate Penitentiary when it is taken over by Lock-Up. When Nightwing is captured after trying to retake the prison from Lock-Up, Firefly attempts to kill him and wear his skin over his burned body.

In DC One Million (1998), Firefly nearly burns down Gotham while infected with the Hourman virus, requiring Nightwing and Robin to work with the future Batman to stop him.

Firefly makes a short appearance in the Justice League of America story arc "Crisis of Conscience", fighting Catwoman in Gotham City over a diamond before Batman arrives. Although an epic battle between the Secret Society of Super Villains and the Justice League ensues, Firefly is knocked unconscious and remains that way during the entire battle. He makes another short appearance in the 2005 miniseries Villains United when the Secret Six attempts to escape the Society's grasp.

Firefly is among the characters apparently killed by the OMACs in The OMAC Project (June 2005), although he later appears alive in Villains United (the following July) and Gotham Underground. He and Mr. Freeze are again shown as having worked together a month after the events of the Crisis. Batman works with a redeemed Harvey Dent to take them down before he takes his year of absence, leaving Dent to guard Gotham.

In Final Crisis, Firefly is with Cheetah's Secret Society of Super Villains during the creation of Genocide. He was defeated by Wonder Woman alongside Shrapnel, Phobia, and T. O. Morrow.

In Batman: Streets of Gotham (2009), Black Mask recruits Firefly into his group to take over Gotham, but he follows his own agenda. Inspired by the chemicals that Black Mask used on him, Firefly inserts chips into Gothamites to make them burn. Not long after the identity of the new Black Mask was revealed to be Jeremiah Arkham, Firefly was arrested and put into Arkham Asylum. A short time later, Firefly is broken out of Arkham by Dick Grayson, who has assumed the mantle of Batman, to assist him in gaining access to Sebastian Blackspell's closest friends. Dick desires to know what Blackspell's true intentions are in regards to killing the Riddler.

In 2016, DC Comics implemented another relaunch of its books called DC Rebirth which restored its continuity to a form much as it was before The New 52. Garfield Lynns operated as Firefly before being killed by his usurper Ted Carson.

In the 2021 Infinite Frontier relaunch, Lynns turns up alive and operates as Firefly alongside Carson. Lynns also appeared in the Batman: Dark Patterns limited series, set during the early years of Batman's career, in which then-Lieutenant Jim Gordon enlists his expertise while investigating an arsonist known as the "Child of Fire".

== Powers and abilities ==
Following Crisis on Infinite Earths' reboot of the DC Universe, Firefly's depiction was drastically altered from that of a mere criminal who utilized colored lights and optical illusions to that of a violent sociopath with intense pyromania. Even prior to becoming Firefly, Garfield Lynns was already an expert in pyrotechnics and explosives with a thorough knowledge of flammable agents. After he is horribly scarred by a blaze at a chemical factory, Lynns mechanically engineered an insulated, fireproof battle suit to protect himself. This specialized outfit is equipped with an extensive arsenal of fire-creating weapons, including a military-grade flamethrower, various incendiary devices (such as grenades, napalm, and smoke bombs), and a sword-like blade of superheated plasma for close-ranged hand-to-hand combat. A high-tech, winged jet pack is also mounted on the back of the armor to allow for high-speed flight.

== Other characters named Firefly ==
There have been other characters who have operated as Firefly:

=== Ted Carson ===
A man named Ted Carson becomes the second character to adopt the Firefly identity. Created by Bill Finger and Sheldon Moldoff, he first appeared in Batman #126. Carson was an ostentatiously wealthy gold mine heir who gambled his family fortune away and subsequently turned to a life of crime as the second Firefly. Carson then goes on a robbery spree before being apprehended by Batman and Batwoman.

In 2011, "The New 52" rebooted the DC universe. Ted Carson is a former high school teacher who tries to incinerate everything that will separate him from his ex-girlfriend Cindy Cooke, though he is ultimately defeated by Nightwing and Batgirl.

In 2016, DC Comics implemented another relaunch of its books called DC Rebirth, which restored its continuity to a form much as it was before The New 52. Ted Carson and Killer Moth attempt to kill Batman to collect Two-Face's multi-million dollar bounty. Carson is later seen as one of the many villains who Bane attacks in his quest to reach Batman at Arkham Asylum.

During the gang war between Joker and Riddler, Carson is shown siding with the Riddler's faction.

After killing Garfield Lynns, Carson took on Bridgit Pike as a protégé at the time when they were hired by Kobra to kill Batman.

In "Infinite Frontier", Carson continues to operate as Firefly alongside Lynns.

=== Bridgit Pike ===
Ted Carson's protégée Bridgit Pike (a character introduced in the TV series Gotham) adopts the identity of Lady Firefly. She first appeared in Detective Comics #988 (September 2018) and was created by James Robinson and Stephen Segovia.

Lady Firefly and Carson are hired by Kobra to kill Batman while he investigates a murder.

== Other versions ==
An alternate timeline variant of Firefly appears in the Flashpoint tie-in The Canterbury Cricket as a member of the Ambush Bugs who is killed in battle against the Amazons.

== In other media ==
=== Television ===
Firefly as depicted in The New Batman Adventures

Firefly as depicted in The Batman

- The Garfield Lynns incarnation of Firefly appears in series set in the DC Animated Universe (DCAU), voiced by Mark Rolston. This version is a former pyrotechnics engineer who was fired by his singer ex-girlfriend Cassidy for intentionally botching a pyrotechnics display during one of her concerts.
  - Firefly is introduced in The New Batman Adventures episode "Torch Song", which sees him attempting to seek revenge on Cassidy. Despite being foiled by Batman, Cassidy is left pyrophobic. Additionally, Firefly makes a minor appearance in "Legends of the Dark Knight". The producers had wanted to use Firefly in the preceding series, Batman: The Animated Series, but Fox forbade them from using pyromaniac characters. Additionally, Cassidy was planned to return and become a new Firefly as a result of her trauma, but the plans for that episode were ultimately scrapped.
  - Firefly returns in the Justice League episode "Only a Dream", in which he forms a casual interest in the similarly-themed Volcana during a prison break before they are apprehended by Green Lantern.
- The Garfield Lynns incarnation of Firefly appears in The Batman, voiced by Jason Marsden. This version bears a suit more akin to his namesake with arm-mounted lasers and a jetpack. Following his introduction in the episode "The Big Heat", he has several encounters with Batman and other Gotham City supervillains over the course of the series, such as Mr. Freeze in the episode "Fire and Ice". In the episode "White Heat", Firefly and his girlfriend Dr. Jane "Blaze" Blazedale steal a phosphorus isotope to upgrade his suit, but an accident causes the isotope to mutate Lynns into the pyrokinetic metahuman Phosphorus. He goes insane and attempts to destroy Gotham, only to be defeated by Batman and remanded to Arkham Asylum, where Blaze breaks up with him.
- The pre-Crisis incarnation of Garfield Lynns / Firefly appears in Batman: The Brave and the Bold, voiced by Robin Atkin Downes.
- Garfield Lynns appears in the Arrow episode "Burned", portrayed by Andrew Dunbar. This version is a former member of the Starling City firefighting unit "The Fireflies" who was presumed killed in a building fire. Having survived in a disfigured state, Lynns became a vengeful recluse. After his wife leaves him and takes their children, Lynns dons a firefighter uniform and begins killing his old crewmates for abandoning him. After being defeated by the Hood, Lynns commits suicide.
- A female incarnation of Firefly named Bridgit Pike appears in Gotham, portrayed by Michelle Veintimilla in the second season and the second half of the fourth season and by Camila Perez in the third season and the first half of the fourth. Pre-dating her appearance in the comics, this version is the abused quasi "step-sister" of arsonists Joe, Cale, and Evan Pike. After Evan is killed by Jim Gordon and Nathaniel Barnes, Joe and Cale force Bridgit to help them burn down Wayne Enterprises buildings at Oswald Cobblepot and Theo Galavan's behest. However, she goes to her old friend Selina Kyle for help and the pair rob a brothel so Bridgit can leave Gotham City. When Joe and Cale kidnap and threaten her, Bridgit kills them with a flamethrower. During a confrontation with Gordon, a gas leak results in Bridgit accidentally setting herself on fire. She is brought to Arkham Asylum, where Professor Hugo Strange heals her and gives her a fireproof suit before Kyle eventually helps facilitate her escape. Throughout the third season, Bridgit found work at a metal refinery before Cobblepot and Ivy Pepper convince her to join them in retaking Cobblepot's criminal empire from the Riddler. In the fourth season, Bridgit joins Jerome Valeska's "Legion of Horribles" to assist in their plan to disperse the Scarecrow's fear toxin throughout Gotham. After Jeremiah Valeska destroys Gotham's bridges and declares the city a "no man's land", Bridgit and her gang claim the Bowery district.
- The Garfield Lynns incarnation of Firefly appears in Harley Quinn, voiced by Alan Tudyk. This version is a member of the Legion of Doom.

=== Film ===
- The Garfield Lynns incarnation of Firefly appears in Batman: Bad Blood, voiced by Steve Blum. This version is a mercenary aligned with the League of Assassins and partner of Killer Moth who is later killed in an explosion.
- The Ted Carson incarnation of Firefly was set to appear in the cancelled DC Extended Universe film Batgirl, portrayed by Brendan Fraser. This version was a disgruntled veteran who lost his benefits and sought to burn down Gotham City.
- The Garfield Lynns incarnation of Firefly makes a non-speaking appearance in Batman: Knightfall.

=== Video games ===
Firefly in a promotional image for Batman: Arkham Origins (2013)

- The Garfield Lynns incarnation of Firefly appears as a character summon in Scribblenauts Unmasked: A DC Comics Adventure.
- The Garfield Lynns incarnation of Firefly appears in the Batman: Arkham series, voiced by Crispin Freeman.
  - He first appears as a boss in Batman: Arkham Origins. After being hired by the Joker disguised as Black Mask to kill Batman, Firefly takes hostages and plants explosives on the Gotham Pioneers' Bridge to draw Batman out, but is ultimately defeated by Batman with the help of Gotham City Police Department Captain James Gordon.
  - Firefly returns in Batman: Arkham Knight. The side mission "The Line of Duty" reveals that, prior to the game's events, Gotham City Fire Department Chief Raymond Underhill hired Firefly to burn down a list of abandoned buildings in hopes of preventing his firefighters from being laid off, but Firefly betrayed Underhill and kidnapped his crew during Scarecrow's takeover of Gotham City, forcing Batman to save the captured firemen from Firefly's thugs and uncover Underhill's corruption. In the side mission "Gotham on Fire", Firefly attempts to destroy Gotham's firehouses, but Batman pursues, defeats, and imprisons both him and Underhill at the GCPD lockup.
  - Firefly makes a vocal cameo appearance in Batman: Arkham Shadow, having been imprisoned at Blackgate Penitentiary following the events of Arkham Origins.

==== Lego series ====
- The Garfield Lynns incarnation of Firefly appears as an unlockable character in the Nintendo DS version of Lego Batman: The Videogame.
- The Garfield Lynns incarnation of Firefly appears in Lego Batman 3: Beyond Gotham, voiced again by Robin Atkin Downes. This version is a member of the Legion of Doom whose appearance is based on his design in The Batman.
- The Garfield Lynns incarnation of Firefly appears as a playable character in Lego DC Super-Villains, voiced again by Crispin Freeman. This version is a member of the Legion of Doom.
- The Garfield Lynns incarnation of Firefly appears in Lego Batman: Legacy of the Dark Knight.

=== Miscellaneous ===
- The Garfield Lynns incarnation of Firefly appears in Smallville Season 11: Lantern #2, in which he temporarily obtains a yellow power ring from Parallax and becomes a Yellow Lantern before he is depowered by Batman and returned to Arkham Asylum.
- An unidentified Firefly makes a minor appearance in Batman: The Brave and the Bold.
- The Garfield Lynns incarnation of Firefly appears in a tie-in prequel comic for Batman v Superman: Dawn of Justice.
- Firefly appears in DC Super Hero Girls, voiced by Khary Payton.
- An original incarnation of Firefly named Sunny appears in Batman: The Adventures Continue #3. She is an assistant to Deathstroke who borrows Garfield Lynns' technology.
- "Robert Lowery / Firefly" appears in Batman '89: Echoes as an alias used by Bruce Wayne as part of his efforts to infiltrate Arkham Asylum.

=== Merchandise ===
- An action figure of Firefly was released by Mattel in 2004 as a part of their toy line for The Batman.
- DC Collectibles released a 7-inch action figure of Firefly in Series 2 of their Batman: Arkham Origins line, based on his design in the 2013 video game of the same name. This statue was sculpted by Gentle Giant Studios.
- Lego released a minifigure of Firefly in the set "Bat Mech vs Poison Ivy Mech". This version's appearance is based on his design from The Batman and Lego DC Super-Villains.
- An action figure of Firefly was released as part of the DC Imaginext line of toys in 2018.

== See also ==
- List of Batman family enemies
