= Robert Hull =

American television writer and producer

Robert Hull is an American television writer and producer.

He is currently the executive producer, creator, and showrunner of the Netflix series I WILL FIND YOU based on the New York Times best-selling book by author Harlan Coben and a principle of production company Story Math. I Will Find You was reported as the number 5 English-language show on Netflix of all time and Hull was named as one of Variety's top 61 showrunners of 2026. He was previously a writer and executive producer of the NBC show Quantum Leap after being the co-showrunner and executive producer of the CBS show God Friended Me. A veteran writer-producer, he is well known for his work on The CW Television Network drama/mystery Veronica Mars and Gossip Girl as well as the Fox Television Network/Bad Robot drama Alcatraz produced by J.J. Abrams, and Monarch starring Susan Sarandon, the ABC fantasy/mystery series Once Upon a Time, and Warner Brothers/DC Studios Gotham and Pennyworth.

== Career ==
He got his start producing the crime film Nether World, starring W. Morgan Sheppard and Mark Sheppard that premiered in competition at the Stockholm International Film Festival, before writing and producing the award-winning documentary "The Other Hollywood" that was distributed by IFC. In 2006, he turned his attention to television when he was hired as a writer by Rob Thomas to join his critically acclaimed drama series Veronica Mars. After completion of Veronica Mars, Hull joined the ABC series Big Shots starring Michael Vartan and Dylan McDermott.

In 2008, Hull boarded The CW drama Gossip Girl, as a story editor, for its second season. During the second half of season two, Hull was promoted to executive story editor. With the commencement of the fourth season Hull began serving as co-producer. When the fourth season concluded he left the show. He wrote and produced multiple episodes while working on the series.

During summer 2011, Hull joined the Fox drama Alcatraz as a producer and writer, for its freshman and only season where he wrote multiple episodes. After the show's cancelation, he joined the breakout hit ABC fantasy series Once Upon a Time, for its second season. rising to Supervising Producer with the commencement of its third season. After taking a year off to focus on development, he returned to Warner Brothers and FOX as a Co-EP on the DC Comics hit Gotham. He currently serves as a showrunner of I Will Find You for Netflix.
