= Gotham season 1 =

Gotham
- Season 1
- Home media cover art
- Starring: Ben McKenzie; Donal Logue; David Mazouz; Zabryna Guevara; Sean Pertwee; Robin Lord Taylor; Erin Richards; Camren Bicondova; Cory Michael Smith; Victoria Cartagena; Andrew Stewart-Jones; John Doman; Jada Pinkett Smith
- No. of episodes: 22

Release
- Original network: Fox
- Original release: September 22, 2014 – May 4, 2015

Season chronology
- Next → Season 2

The first season of the American television series Gotham, based on characters from DC Comics related to the Batman franchise, revolves around the characters of James "Jim" Gordon and Bruce Wayne. The season is produced by Primrose Hill Productions, DC Entertainment, and Warner Bros. Television, with Bruno Heller and Danny Cannon serving as the showrunners.

The season was ordered in September 2013. Ben McKenzie stars, alongside Donal Logue, David Mazouz, Zabryna Guevara, Sean Pertwee, Robin Lord Taylor, Erin Richards, Camren Bicondova, Cory Michael Smith, Victoria Cartagena, Andrew Stewart-Jones, John Doman and Jada Pinkett Smith. The season was broadcast over 2 runs: the first 10 episodes aired from September to November 2014; and the other 12 episodes aired from January to May 2015. The season premiered on September 22, 2014, and concluded on May 4, 2015, on Fox.

== Cast and characters ==
=== Main ===
- Ben McKenzie as James "Jim" Gordon
- Donal Logue as Harvey Bullock
- David Mazouz as Bruce Wayne
- Zabryna Guevara as Sarah Essen
- Sean Pertwee as Alfred Pennyworth
- Robin Lord Taylor as Oswald Cobblepot / The Penguin
- Erin Richards as Barbara Kean
- Camren Bicondova as Selina "Cat" Kyle
- Cory Michael Smith as Edward Nygma
- Victoria Cartagena as Renee Montoya
- Andrew Stewart-Jones as Crispus Allen
- John Doman as Carmine Falcone
- Jada Pinkett Smith as Fish Mooney

=== Recurring ===
- Drew Powell as Butch Gilzean
- David Zayas as Sal Maroni
- Morena Baccarin as Leslie Thompkins
- J. W. Cortes as Alvarez
- Chelsea Spack as Kristen Kringle
- Alex Corrado as Gabe
- Makenzie Leigh as Liza
- Richard Kind as Aubrey James
- Clare Foley as Ivy Pepper
- Carol Kane as Gertrud Kapelput
- Dashiell Eaves as Kelly
- Philip Hernandez as Guerra
- Danny Mastrogiorgio as Frankie Carbone
- Anthony Carrigan as Victor Zsasz
- Peter Scolari as Gillian B. Loeb

=== Guest ===
- Brette Taylor as Martha Wayne
- Grayson McCouch as Thomas Wayne
- Brad Calcaterra as Minks
- Daniel Stewart Sherman as Mario Pepper
- Polly Lee as Alice Pepper
- Lili Taylor as Patti
- Frank Whaley as Doug
- Dan Bakkedahl as Davis Lamond / The Balloonman
- James Colby as Bill Cranston
- Jack Koenig as Ronald Danzer
- Susan Misner as Marks
- Todd Stashwick as Richard Sionis
- Cole Vallis as Tommy Elliott
- Nicholas D'Agosto as Harvey Dent
- Lesley-Ann Brandt as Larissa Diaz / Copperhead
- Christopher Heyerdahl as Jack Gruber
- Julian Sands as Gerald Crane
- Charlie Tahan as Jonathan Crane
- Cameron Monaghan as Jerome Valeska
- Mark Margolis as Paul Cicero
- Colm Feore as Francis Dulmacher / Dollmaker
- Zachary Spicer as Tom Dougherty
- Milo Ventimiglia as Jason Lennon / Ogre
- Chris Chalk as Lucius Fox

== Episodes ==
No. overall	No. in season	Title	Directed by	Written by	Original release date	Prod. code	US viewers (millions)
1	1	"Pilot"	Danny Cannon	Bruno Heller	September 22, 2014	276072	8.21
Rookie detective James "Jim" Gordon and his partner Harvey Bullock are assigned to the case of the murders of Thomas and Martha Wayne, witnessed by petty street criminal Selina "Cat" Kyle. Their investigation leads them to a parolee named Mario Pepper, whom Bullock kills in Gordon's defense. They discover that Pepper had been framed, leading them to mobster Fish Mooney, an associate of Carmine Falcone, an organized crime boss. Mooney has them captured, but Falcone spares them upon his arrival, revealing that he intended to end the case so that the people of Gotham could feel safe, facilitating his illegal activities. In exchange, Falcone orders Gordon to kill Oswald Cobblepot, a low-level member of Mooney's gang and informant for Gotham Major Crimes Unit (MCU) investigators Renee Montoya and Crispus Allen. Gordon fakes Cobblepot's death, and tells him never to return to Gotham. Gordon promises the Waynes' son, Bruce, and his butler, Alfred Pennyworth, he will find the real killer. Cobblepot kills a fisher. Selina is seen watching the Wayne Manor. Meanwhile, Montoya threatens Barbara, Gordon's fiancee, to tell him about Barbara's unknown past.
2	2	"Selina Kyle"	Danny Cannon	Bruno Heller	September 29, 2014	4X6652	7.45
Gordon and Bullock start investigating the abductions of street kids by Patti and Doug, operatives of Dr. Francis Dulmacher, A.K.A. the Dollmaker, and have been posing as members of the Mayor's Homeless Outreach Program. Mayor Aubrey James announces plans to help Gotham's homeless kids, rounding them up and shipping them out of town. Patti and Doug hijack one of the buses of street kids, including Selina. After Bullock's extreme interrogation of an informant, Gordon obtains a clue. Gordon and Bullock arrive and catch Patti and Doug while encountering Kyle. While Bruce has plans to find a way to help the children, Gordon meets with Kyle who states that she has been watching him during his visits with Bruce and might have some information on the person who shot the Waynes. Meanwhile, Cobblepot kills one of two men after they mock his walking pattern. He takes refuge in a rented trailer after his faked death, plotting his return to Gotham City, having kidnapped the other man for ransom. Falcone confronts Mooney for her plans to overthrow him, having heard from Cobblepot. The former warns her by having her lover beaten. Allen and Montoya investigate Cobblepot's mother.
3	3	"The Balloonman"	Dermott Downs	John Stephens	October 6, 2014	4X6653	6.36
Gordon and Bullock track a vigilante who targets corrupt Gotham officials and is nicknamed "Balloonman" for strapping his victims to weather balloons, which eventually implode in the cold atmosphere, giving the victim a long fall. Montoya and Allen question Gordon about Cobblepot, who returns to Gotham to get revenge on Mooney. He gets a job at Don Sal Maroni's restaurant and is befriended by Maroni himself. Mooney arranges for Falcone's lover Natalia to be disfigured in response to her own lover's beating. Gordon realizes that "Balloonman" is social worker Davis Lamond, who was driven to vigilantism because of corrupt officials refusing to aid children on the streets. After arrest, he warns Gordon that more vigilantes will follow in his path. Falcone tells Mooney that he will investigate what happened to Natalia, also telling him about the Arkham Plan. At his apartment later, Gordon receives a surprise visit from Cobblepot. Meanwhile, Barbara is revealed to be an addict and Montoya's former girlfriend. Selina is given to Gordon for his investigation, but she uses the chance to escape.
4	4	"Arkham"	TJ Scott	Ken Woodruff	October 13, 2014	4X6654	6.39
Cobblepot offers Gordon help in stopping the future war. The latter learns of the Arkham Plan from Alfred, who states that Falcone and Mayor James are backing the project that will improve the Arkham District, as opposed to Maroni, who has another plan. An independent hitman starts targeting the city council members involved in both opposing sides of the Plan. After an armed robbery of Maroni's restaurant, Cobblepot is promoted to restaurant manager by Maroni, following the former's action of saving a bag of money and the death of the previous manager. Mooney pits two female singers against each other for her nightclub job opening, with the winner being Liza. To prevent the war, Mayor James holds a conference about a compromise on the Arkham Plan, that Falcone will handle small housing development projects and Maroni will be refurbishing the Asylum. Gordon urges Bruce not to lose hope in the city. Later, Cobblepot fatally poisons the restaurant robbers, who are revealed to have been hired for just that purpose by Cobblepot himself. Meanwhile, Barbara confronts Gordon about Cobblepot, telling him about her past with Montoya. She decides to end the engagement when he refuses to talk.
5	5	"Viper"	Tim Hunter	Rebecca Perry Cutter	October 20, 2014	4X6655	6.09
Bruce plans to find a way to speak to the board members of Wayne Enterprises to learn their connections to the Arkham District Project. A new drug called "Viper", a prototype of Venom, is hitting the street, endowing the user with super-strength, but eventually killing them. Maroni plans to rob a casino owned by Falcone, and Cobblepot offers a less-casualty plan, forcing him to reveal his past, which Maroni believes after Gordon confirms it. The latter learns that "Viper" is being distributed at a charity event held by WellZyn and Wayne Enterprises. Gordon shoots the canister on the roof and former WellZyn employee Stan Potolsky is exposed, committing suicide after he suggests they check out Warehouse 39, where Gordon and Bullock later find nothing, observed by Wayne Enterprises operative Mathis. Maroni successfully robs the casino, admiring Cobblepot. As Mooney makes plans to conspire against Falcone with her lover and Russian mob boss Nikolai, a disguised Liza visits Falcone and begins seducing him.
6	6	"Spirit of the Goat"	TJ Scott	Ben Edlund	October 27, 2014	4X6656	5.89
Ten years ago, a masked killer calling himself the "Spirit of the Goat" targets the firstborn of Gotham's elite, leading Bullock and his partner Dix to investigate the case. They find the killer, Randall Milkie, who is shot down by Bullock after Dix falls through a trap door and ends up badly injured. In the present day, Bullock finds another elite firstborn murdered by someone with the same "Goat" motive. At the autopsy, Bullock sees Milkie's trademark, which only he and Dix knew, meaning that he was not a copycat. During a debrief, Dix tells Gordon about Bullock's enthusiasm for justice, to Gordon's surprise. Bullock deduces that hypnotherapist Marks coerced both Milkie and the new killer to become the Goat to scare Gotham's rich and corrupt, leading to Marks' arrest. The "murder" of Cobblepot is also investigated, with Gordon the prime suspect as Montoya and Allen finally find a witness near the river. When they attempt to arrest Gordon and Bullock, Cobblepot enters the precinct, causing friction between Bullock and Gordon. Meanwhile, CSU operative Nygma is revealed to be in love with archivist Kristen Kringle, who ignores him. Selina infiltrates Wayne Manor and steals a component of Bruce's investigation.
7	7	"Penguin's Umbrella"	Rob Bailey	Bruno Heller	November 3, 2014	4X6657	6.63
Exonerated, Gordon tells Barbara to leave Gotham. Cobblepot leads Maroni enforcer Frankie Carbone and two other henchmen to Nikolai's hideout, killing the latter and Carbone by buying the loyalties of the henchmen. Montoya and Allen begin cooperating with Gordon. The escalating mob war is settled with a land trade between Maroni and Falcone. A drunken Bullock re-evaluates his choice for helping Gordon, and the two partners attempt to arrest Mayor James and Falcone, but they give up when it is revealed that Falcone and hitman Victor Zsasz have Barbara, who had returned to try and negotiate with Falcone for Gordon. Falcone allows the trio to leave. In a flashback to the night they had met Gordon, it is shown that Cobblepot and Falcone had formed a deal, in which Falcone would place Gordon in charge of killing Cobblepot, giving Cobblepot a chance at surviving, and in exchange, Cobblepot would ally with Maroni, snitching for Falcone; and Cobblepot told Falcone about Mooney and Nikolai and their plan. It is revealed that Falcone spared Gordon's life due to Cobblepot's request.
8	8	"The Mask"	Paul Edwards	John Stephens	November 10, 2014	4X6658	6.35
Bruce returns to school, where he has some trouble with bully Tommy Elliot; and Alfred agrees to teach the former how to fight. Gordon and Bullock investigate Richard Sionis, who is hosting an illegal and deadly fight club where the champions are accepted for Sionis Investments. Liza's loyalty to Mooney begins to falter when she learns of the latter's plan to eventually kill Falcone, but Mooney presses her to steal a ledger from Falcone's office that may be used to incriminate him. When Gordon is caught at the site of the fight club, Bullock persuades other officers, who collectively despise Gordon due to blaming them for leaving him during Zsasz's attack, to help find Gordon. Mooney fakes a story about her past to convince Liza to stay on the mission. After Sionis and those involved are arrested, Gordon learns that Selina was apprehended after skillfully robbing a dress store. Barbara leaves Gordon. Cobblepot learns from Mooney's henchman of a spy close to Falcone.
9	9	"Harvey Dent"	Karen Gaviola	Ken Woodruff	November 17, 2014	4X6659	6.49
Gordon has Selina placed at Wayne Manor for her safety. She and Bruce establish a friendship. She claims that her mother is an intelligence agent. During a prison transport from Blackgate Penitentiary to St. Mark Psychiatric Hospital, bomb maker Ian Hargrove is taken by the Russian mob, who are working against Falcone following Nikolai's death. Gordon meets with Harvey Dent, who suspects tycoon Dick Lovecraft for the Wayne murders. Gordon and Bullock realize that Hargrove intends no harm. Manipulated by Mooney, the Russians target Falcone's cache of money, but when a police standoff ensues, the Russians' armored truck explodes via remote control by Mooney's enforcer, Butch Gilzean. Cobblepot confronts Liza for spying on Falcone, whom the former claims will not tell. Mayor James announces his plans to reopen Arkham Asylum to house the mentally ill criminals, including Hargrove. Barbara is revealed to be sleeping with Montoya.
10	10	"Lovecraft"	Guy Ferland	Rebecca Dameron	November 24, 2014	4X6660	6.05
Assassins led by Copperhead infiltrate Wayne Manor, but Bruce and Selina escape into the city. Alfred seeks Gordon and Bullock's help to find the pair. Dent suspects that Lovecraft hired the assassins to cover his tracks. However, Gordon learns Lovecraft is also being targeted to hide what he knows; the assassins kill Lovecraft in a staged suicide, planting Gordon's gun at the scene. Following the armory fiasco, Cobblepot tells Falcone that Mooney has a mole in his ranks, but does not reveal the identity. Selina determines the assassins are after her, and she and Bruce encounter Ivy Pepper, Mario's daughter. The assassins find Selina and Bruce, but she escapes while Bullock and Alfred, who convinces Mooney to help, arrive and rescue Bruce. Selina later kisses Bruce and returns to living on the streets. Following Lovecraft's "suicide", Mayor James reassigns Gordon as a security guard at Arkham Asylum.
11	11	"Rogues' Gallery"	Oz Scott	Sue Chung	January 5, 2015	4X6661	7.06
While working at Arkham run by Dr. Gerry Lang, Gordon investigates a series of attacks on inmates with the help of Dr. Leslie "Lee" Thompkins. Mooney discusses her plan to overthrow Falcone with underboss Jimmy Saviano, who has a disagreement with her on succession. Cobblepot is arrested by the police for trying to further extort some fishermen already paying protection money to Maroni. The former is freed by the latter, who initiated the arrest to warn Cobblepot about hubris. Montoya ends her relationship with Barbara. Gordon, Bullock, and Captain Essen discover that the person attacking the inmates was Jack Gruber, who then escapes from Arkham with his associate Aaron Danzig, after killing several guards and Dr. Lang. Saviano tries to convince Gilzean to change sides, but the latter kills him instead. Selina takes an ill Ivy to Gordon's. Barbara calls and mistakes Ivy as his girlfriend.
12	12	"What the Little Bird Told Him"	Eagle Egilsson	Ben Edlund	January 19, 2015	4X6662	6.50
Gruber and Danzig go on a rampage through Gotham. Gordon promises Commissioner Loeb he will arrest Gruber within 24 hours. Nygma learns Gruber is actually Jack Buchinsky, a former Mafia bank robber who was betrayed by Maroni. Gordon and Bullock put Maroni under protective custody to use as bait to attract Gruber to the precinct. Gruber and Danzig attack, but Gordon thwarts them by shorting out Gruber's electrical apparatus with water. For living up to his end of the deal, Gordon is reinstated as a detective. Meanwhile, Mooney makes her move against Falcone by "abducting" Liza and extorting him into signing his crime family over to Mooney's gang. Falcone nearly goes through with the deal, but Cobblepot informs him that Liza is Mooney's mole. Falcone confronts Mooney, has his mercenaries take both her and Gilzean prisoner, and strangles Liza to death. Cobblepot inherits Mooney's nightclub and what's left of her gang. Barbara visits her estranged parents. Maroni begins suspecting Cobblepot. Gordon and Lee develop a romance.
13	13	"Welcome Back, Jim Gordon"	Wendey Stanzler	Megan Mostyn-Brown	January 26, 2015	4X6663	6.04
Mooney is tortured by Falcone's henchman, but Gilzean frees himself and rescues her. A homicide witness is murdered while under custody at GCPD. Gordon comes to suspect Narcotics Detective Arnold Flass is behind. Learning that Flass is supported by influential figures, Gordon asks Cobblepot for help, who tasks his enforcer, Gabe. Bruce asks Selina about his parents' murderer, but she reveals she lied about seeing the man's face to avoid being sent to juvenile detention. Nygma gives Kringle a romantic greeting card, but Flass finds it and mocks him; Kringle later apologizes to Nygma and admires the card. Gabe gives Gordon evidence that exposes Flass' involvement in the witness' death, and Flass is arrested. Gordon learns that Gabe threatened the family of Delaware, Flass's accomplice, for proof. Mooney and Gilzean confront Cobblepot at the nightclub, but Zsasz arrives and recaptures Gilzean. Mooney escapes and decides to temporarily leave Gotham, with Bullock revealed as her lover.
14	14	"The Fearsome Dr. Crane"	John Behring	John Stephens	February 2, 2015	4X6664	5.79
Gordon and Bullock investigate a serial killer who is targeting members of a phobia support group and extracting their adrenal glands. The killer turns out to be Gerald Crane, Jonathan's father; Gordon and Bullock can save one of his victims, but Crane evades capture. In light of Selina's recent claim of false witness, Bruce absolves Gordon of his promise to find the killer, intending to solve the case himself. Mooney informs Maroni about Cobblepot's treachery to him. Maroni tries to kill Cobblepot, who escapes. Nygma frames medical examiner Guerra for hoarding body parts after Guerra has him suspended for his repeated corpse probing. After Guerra's suspension and Nygma's reinstatement, Gordon informs Lee, who finds a clue in Crane's case, that a job has opened up for her as GCPD's medical examiner. Mooney is captured by mercenaries on a boat away from Gotham.
15	15	"The Scarecrow"	Nick Copus	Ken Woodruff	February 9, 2015	4X6665	5.63
Gordon and Bullock investigate Gerald's background and learn his wife died in a fire that he was too scared to rescue her from; believing fear is a human flaw, he is now harvesting adrenal glands to create a serum that makes people confront and overcome their greatest fears. Bruce continues a yearly family tradition by going on a hiking trip in the woods, albeit alone for the first time. He finds himself unprepared for the dangers, but Alfred eventually joins him. Maroni speaks with Falcone and agrees to let Cobblepot live, but warns the latter that it will last until Falcone's eventual death. After using the serum on himself and overcoming his fear, Gerald injects Jonathan with a much larger dose. Gordon and Bullock arrive and kill Gerald in a gunfight. Jonathan is rushed to the hospital, but the serum has sent him into a state of constant terror, and he may never stop hallucinating his greatest fear: scarecrows. Mooney wakes up among other captives and befriends a man named Kelly. She kills the prisoners' leader and takes his place, learning that their captors are organ harvesters. Lee becomes the new medical examiner.
16	16	"The Blind Fortune Teller"	Jeffrey Hunt	Bruno Heller	February 16, 2015	4X6666	6.19
Barbara returns to Gotham to find Ivy and Selina squatting in her apartment. Gordon and Lee investigate the murder of Lila Valeska, a snake dancer with Haly's Circus, and the contesting families Flying Graysons and the Lloyds are suspects. Gordon determines that Lila's son Jerome is the killer, which he eventually admits maniacally. When business begins to decrease at Cobblepot's club, Zsasz brings in a brainwashed Gilzean for help. Taking advice from Selina and Ivy, Barbara attempts to reunite with Gordon but changes her mind after she sees him kissing Lee. Bruce holds a board meeting at Wayne Enterprises and voices concern to the executives that the company is involved with the mob, threatening with legal action. John Grayson and Mary Lloyd get engaged after the dispute between the two families are resolved. Mooney manages to get a meeting with the captors' boss after uniting the prisoners against the captors.
17	17	"Red Hood"	Nathan Hope	Danny Cannon	February 23, 2015	4X6667	6.53
An armed group robs a bank, and one wearing a red mask throws some of the stolen money into the crowd to ensure their escape. Gordon and Bullock identify the "Red Hood" as Gus Floyd, but find him dead in the hideout. After a robbery led by Carl Destro, who now wears Floyd's mask, and the Hood becomes a public hero, Gordon and Bullock track him to his house where they find him wounded and the mask gone. With the information given by Destro, the police find and kill the remainder of the gang in a shootout. A teenage boy steals the mask. Meanwhile, Cobblepot struggles with Maroni's actions against the restaurant, but Butch uses some fake policemen to seize Maroni's supplies. Mooney discovers that the facility is owned by Dulmacher, meeting the manager, who tries to take her eye for organ trade purposes; but she removes it herself and destroys it before passing out. An old comrade of Alfred, Reginald Payne, visits him in the Manor and stays overnight. On the next day, however, he steals some of Bruce's files, stabs Alfred to evade capture, and reports to the Board that Bruce has no solid evidence.
18	18	"Everyone Has a Cobblepot"	Bill Eagles	Megan Mostyn-Brown	March 2, 2015	4X6668	6.10
At the hospital, Alfred refuses to implicate Payne. Gordon and Dent investigate the sudden release and reinstatement of Flass by Loeb, who announces his support of Flass as the new president of the policemen's union. Bullock reveals that Loeb has leverage to blackmail most officers; in Bullock's case, Loeb forced him to falsely confess to providing illegitimate evidence against Flash. Investigating a triad bookmaking office and interrogating Loeb's former partner, Gordon learns that Loeb has ties with Falcone. With Cobblepot's help, Gordon and Bullock investigate Loeb's uptown farm, where they find the latter's psychotic daughter Miriam, who confesses to her mother's murder, which Gordon uses to terminate Bullock's case by blackmailing Loeb, who announces Gordon as the new candidate. Meanwhile, Mooney finally meets Dulmacher, who provides her with a blue-irised eye and allows her to prove herself to become his right-hand woman. She surrenders some of the prisoners, including Kelly. She discovers that the facility is situated on a snowy island. Selina visits Bruce and offers her help in his investigation, which he refuses. Nygma learns that Kringle has a new boyfriend in the GCPD.
19	19	"Beasts of Prey"	Eagle Egilsson	Ken Woodruff	April 13, 2015	4X6669	4.50
Despite Gordon's warning, Bruce goes after Payne with Selina's help. Payne confesses that he was hired by the Board. Selina pushes Payne out a window after Bruce hesitates to do so, presumably killing him. Gordon and Bullock investigate an unsolved murder case. Upon Nygma discovering a painting of a broken heart as the key evidence, Bullock realizes that the serial killer called "the Ogre" is responsible. Harvey then states that everyone who tried to investigate the Ogre lost their loved ones. It is revealed that the Ogre keeps his victims prisoner for some time until he realizes she is not a fit for his desire, so he kills her. Meanwhile, Oswald manages to convince a bar owner to do business, but his real intention is to kill Maroni in the bar. Mooney succeeds in escaping with Kelly and some other inmates by luring another group to a fatal dead end. She is shot during the takeoff by the "Catcher", the chief guard. It is revealed that Loeb had the case given to Gordon, but the latter decides to continue the investigation, knowing the threat upon Lee. Gordon promises Loeb that he will face justice too.
20	20	"Under the Knife"	TJ Scott	John Stephens	April 20, 2015	4X6670	4.44
Lee refuses to leave town, staying at the GCPD. The "Ogre" calls Gordon and makes his typical threat. Following the incident with Payne, Bruce and Selina attend Wayne Enterprises' Charity Ball with Barbara, where Selina copies keys from Sid Banderslaw, one of the executives who hired Payne. Cobblepot allies himself with Irish hitmen in hopes of killing Maroni, who visits the club and reveals to the former's mother that her son is a psychopathic killer. Nygma tries to protect Kringle from her abusive boyfriend Tom Dougherty but goes too far when he stabs him to death and has a psychotic breakdown. Investigating the Ogre's first victim, Gordon, Bullock, and Essen identify the killer as Jason Skolimski, who illicitly inherited the fortune of a woman, whose butler is his father, who covered up the murder. Gordon learns that Jason saw him with Barbara at a charity event some time prior, meaning she is the target. Jason approaches Barbara at the Ball and takes her to his home, as witnessed by Selina.
21	21	"The Anvil or the Hammer"	Paul Edwards	Jordan Harper	April 27, 2015	4X6671	4.58
Jason holds Barbara captive and forces her at knifepoint to choose his next victim. Nygma disposes of Dougherty's body and forges a letter from him saying a cold goodbye to Kringle. Bruce sneaks into Bunderslaw's office to open his safe, but Bunderslaw was expecting Bruce and has emptied it. He claims that Thomas knew of Wayne Enterprises' illegal activities but kept quiet. Junior executive Lucius Fox tells Bruce that Thomas did not approve of the company's crimes. Bruce confesses his and Selina's adventures, including Payne's death, to Alfred. Cobblepot sends the hitmen to attack Maroni but is revealed to have set up the plan to frame Falcone and start a war between the two mob bosses. Gordon and Bullock locate Jason's apartment, but he and Barbara have already left for her parents' mansion. There, they find her parents dead, and Gordon kills Jason after a standoff. Later, Gordon reassures Lee that he no longer loves Barbara. Maroni begins attacking Falcone's men, and Essen calls all GCPD officers to remain on duty during the upcoming gang war.
22	22	"All Happy Families Are Alike"	Danny Cannon	Bruno Heller	May 4, 2015	4X6672	4.93
The mob war between Falcone and Maroni escalates. Cobblepot attempts to kill Falcone himself and take his place, but Gordon intervenes. As Maroni's men approach, Gordon and Bullock bring Falcone, Cobblepot, and Butch to a safe house, but Mooney's new gang, including Selina, takes them captive. Maroni arrives, but Cobblepot manipulates him and Mooney into a dispute over mob leadership. Mooney kills Maroni for slighting her. Gordon, Bullock, and Falcone escape in the ensuing chaos. While Butch struggles on whom to be loyal to, Cobblepot fights and throws Mooney off the roof into the water, declaring himself Gotham's new crime lord. Barbara undergoes trauma counseling with Lee; she reveals she killed her parents and attacks Lee, who neutralizes her. Kringle begins suspecting Nygma's involvement in Dougherty's disappearance, and he is revealed to have a second personality. Falcone retires from the mob, urging Gordon to continue fighting crime. Believing his father led a secret life and remembering a subtle clue from Fox, Bruce discovers a hidden stairwell behind the fireplace.

== Production ==
=== Development ===
Bruno Heller, a fan of the DC Comics character Bruce Wayne / Batman, had been talking to DC writer Geoff Johns to discuss a potential Batman series. According to Heller, "It opened up a whole world of storytelling that we realized hadn't really been looked at before, which is the world before Batman -- the world of Gotham, young Bruce Wayne, and young James Gordon and the origin stories of the villains". In a September 2014 with Digital Spy, Heller said he was initially hesitant to do a superhero series because he did not know how to write about people with superpowers, adding "Human beings are diminished as soon as a superhero walks onto the screen. As soon as the superhero walks out of frame, you're waiting for them to come back." But when Heller's son suggested that Gordon be the focus of the series, Heller developed the idea of Gordon investigating the murder of Bruce Wayne's parents. That idea, according to Heller, "gave us a starting point and allowed us to tell the saga from a much earlier point than before".

On September 24, 2013, Fox announced that it had bypassed the traditional pilot and placed an order for Gotham to be written by Heller, who was named as showrunner. Danny Cannon also worked as showrunner alongside Heller. Gotham received a series order from Fox on May 5, 2014, with the first season reported to consist of 16 episodes rather than the standard 13 or 22. On October 13, Fox ordered an additional six episodes for the show, bringing the first season order to a full 22 episodes. Fox's Chairman of Entertainment Kevin Reilly stated, "We were only contractually obligated to order 13, and we ordered 16, because we think that's the way that show, at least in its first iteration, will be very strong to arc to. Could we do more next season? We certainly could, but that's where we're starting with that one. That show is going to have a very strong, serialized element". Speaking of the project at the 2014 winter TCA press tour, Reilly described the series as "this operatic soap that has a slightly larger-than-life quality. This is not some adjunct companion series. This is the Batman franchise, just backing it up [in chronology]". He later added that the series is separate from any DC film universe.

=== Casting ===
In January 2014, rumors arose that Donal Logue would portray the series' version of Gordon. Logue denied these rumors, but was eventually cast as Gordon's partner Harvey Bullock. In February 2014, Ben McKenzie was cast as Gordon. McKenzie had previously shot a pilot with Heller for CBS titled The Advocates which was not picked up; this led to Heller writing his characterization of Gordon with McKenzie in mind. McKenzie described this version of Gordon as "a truly honest man. The last honest man in a city full of crooked people" and added, "He's not an anti-hero, he's a true hero – but he will have to compromise."

Casting Bruce Wayne was challenging in part because, as Heller put it "It's such an important casting and it would've been very dangerous to cast the wrong person", adding that the casting process for Wayne "took a lot of negotiation, a lot of back and forth so that everyone was happy and comfortable." In early March 2014, David Mazouz was cast as Bruce while Camren Bicondova was cast as Selina Kyle. Others in the principal cast were Zabryna Guevara as Sarah Essen, Sean Pertwee as Alfred Pennyworth, Robin Lord Taylor as Oswald Cobblepot / Penguin, Erin Richards as Barbara Kean, Cory Michael Smith as Edward Nygma, Victoria Cartagena as Renee Montoya, Andrew Stewart-Jones as Crispus Allen, John Doman as Carmine Falcone, and Jada Pinkett Smith as Fish Mooney, an original creation for the series. Pinkett Smith drew inspiration from various different individuals for playing Mooney: the fictional character Norma Desmond from the 1950 film Sunset Boulevard; and Griselda Blanco, a real-life drug lord of the Medellín Cartel.

=== Filming ===
Production for the season began in New York City in March 2014, and ended a year later on the same month.

== Release ==
=== Broadcast ===
The season was broadcast over two runs on Fox: the first 10 episodes aired from September to November 2014; and the other 12 episodes aired from February to May 2015. The season premiered on September 22, 2014, and concluded on May 4, 2015.

=== Home media ===
The first season was released on Blu-ray on September 8, 2015.

== Reception ==
=== Ratings ===
Viewership and ratings per episode of Gotham season 1
No.	Title	Air date	Rating/share (18–49)	Viewers (millions)	DVR (18–49)	DVR viewers (millions)	Total (18–49)	Total viewers (millions)
1	"Pilot"	September 22, 2014	3.2/10	8.21	2.7	5.84	6.0	14.15
2	"Selina Kyle"	September 29, 2014	2.8/8	7.45	1.9	4.33	4.7	11.81
3	"The Balloonman"	October 6, 2014	2.5/8	6.36	2.0	4.52	4.5	10.88
4	"Arkham"	October 13, 2014	2.4/7	6.39	1.7	3.95	4.5	10.34
5	"Viper"	October 20, 2014	2.3/7	6.09	1.7	4.33	4.0	10.12
6	"Spirit of the Goat"	October 27, 2014	2.2/7	5.89	1.5	3.78	3.7	9.66
7	"Penguin's Umbrella"	November 3, 2014	2.4/7	6.63	1.7	3.83	4.1	10.47
8	"The Mask"	November 10, 2014	2.2/7	6.35	1.6	3.68	3.8	10.03
9	"Harvey Dent"	November 17, 2014	2.3/6	6.49	1.7	3.77	4.0	10.26
10	"Lovecraft"	November 24, 2014	2.3/7	6.05	1.5	3.56	3.8	9.61
11	"Rogues' Gallery"	January 5, 2015	2.5/8	7.06	1.3	3.04	3.8	10.10
12	"What the Little Bird Told Him"	January 19, 2015	2.2/7	6.50	1.6	3.49	3.8	9.99
13	"Welcome Back, Jim Gordon"	January 26, 2015	2.1/6	6.04	1.3	3.03	3.4	9.07
14	"The Fearsome Dr. Crane"	February 2, 2015	1.9/6	5.79	1.3	2.80	3.2	8.59
15	"The Scarecrow"	February 9, 2015	1.8/6	5.63	1.2	2.76	3.0	8.39
16	"The Blind Fortune Teller"	February 16, 2015	2.1/6	6.19	1.3	3.06	3.4	9.25
17	"Red Hood"	February 23, 2015	2.3/7	6.53	1.3	3.20	3.6	9.73
18	"Everyone Has a Cobblepot"	March 2, 2015	2.0/6	6.10	1.4	3.11	3.4	9.21
19	"Beasts of Prey"	April 13, 2015	1.5/5	4.50	1.1	2.63	2.6	7.13
20	"Under the Knife"	April 20, 2015	1.6/5	4.44	1.1	2.85	2.7	7.28
21	"The Anvil or the Hammer"	April 27, 2015	1.5/5	4.58	1.1	2.65	2.6	7.23
22	"All Happy Families Are Alike"	May 4, 2015	1.7/6	4.93	1.1	2.64	2.8	7.57

=== Critical response ===
The review aggregator Rotten Tomatoes gives the season a rating of 76% based on 612 reviews, with an average rating of 6.85/10. The site's consensus states, "High production values, a talented cast, and an appealingly stylized approach to the Batman mythos help Gotham overcome its occasionally familiar themes." Another review aggregator Metacritic gives the season a score of 70 out of 100, based on 44 critics, indicating "generally favorable" reviews.

David Hinckley of New York Daily News praised the first episode for playing "like a 45-minute movie, with stunning visuals that never feel like a shrunken TV version of the Batman films against which it will inevitably be measured" and lauded Logue's Harvey Bullock as a scene-stealer. The San Jose Mercury News' Chuck Barney called the pilot "a fun, dark, moody and well-paced first hour" and McKenzie's James Gordon a commanding lead, while saying Jada Pinkett Smith is "an absolute blast to watch." Matt Brennan of Indiewire said that Gotham was "the perfect antidote to superhero fatigue", praising the "bright, pop-inflected aesthetic, with urban backdrops that appear as though cut out from the panels of a comic book."

Jeff Jensen of Entertainment Weekly criticized the first half of season one along with the mid-season premiere. He found the personalities of the most characters "already nearly fully formed; all they can become is more or less than what they already are." Jensen added that Gordon not being Gotham's redeemer hurt the premise of the show and heavily criticized what he saw as the under-use of Jada Pinkett Smith's character. In the end, he does not see Gotham "as a show for comic book fanboys" but rather as "a post-fanboy, or fanboy-irrelevant." Oliver Sava of The A.V. Club lamented that "there have been dozens of interpretations of Batman and his city in the 75 years since their creation, and Gotham has trouble finding the right balance of influences".
