= Beasts of Prey (Gotham) =

- Gotham episode
- Episode no.: Season 1 Episode 19
- Directed by: Eagle Egilsson
- Written by: Ken Woodruff
- Production code: 4X6669
- Original air date: April 13, 2015

Guest appearances
- Milo Ventimiglia as Jason Lennon; Morena Baccarin as Dr. Lee Thompkins; Peter Scolari as Commissioner Gillian B. Loeb; Dashiell Eaves as Kelly; Willa Fitzgerald as Grace Fairchild; Brendan Griffin as Len Moore; Barbara Rosenblat as Lidia Bicchieri; P.J. Griffith as the Catcher; David O'Hara as Reggie Payne; Colm Feore as Dr. Francis Dulmacher

Episode chronology
← Previous "Everyone Has a Cobblepot"	Next → "Under the Knife"

"Beasts of Prey" is the nineteenth episode of the television series Gotham. It premiered on FOX on April 13, 2015 and was written by Ken Woodruff, and directed by Eagle Egilsson. In this episode, Gordon (Ben McKenzie) and Bullock (Donal Logue) track down a serial killer known as "The Ogre". Meanwhile, Bruce (David Mazouz) and Selina (Camren Bicondova) continue to investigate Wayne Enterprises.

The episode was watched by 4.50 million viewers and received mixed-to-positive reviews. Critics praised Milo Ventimiglia's performance and use of flashbacks but criticized Fish Mooney's storyline.

== Plot ==
Gordon (Ben McKenzie) gets tasked by a young officer to investigate the murder of a girl, Grace Fairchild (Willa Fitzgerald). Along with Bullock (Donal Logue), they interrogate a bartender for information. Through flashbacks, a man, Jason Lennon (Milo Ventimiglia) seduces Fairchild in the bar and brings her to his house, but when she asks to leave, he kills her. Upon discovering a painting of a broken heart, Bullock states the murderer is a serial killer known as "The Ogre", who targets young women. He also reveals that whoever tries to catch him, the Ogre kills a loved one in revenge.

While on the prison island, Mooney (Jada Pinkett Smith) develops an escape plan with the prisoners. Upon realizing only boats and helicopters are the way out, Mooney sends a group of thug prisoners to reach the boat. However, when they reach the boat, they realize Mooney betrayed them so the others could escape and are killed by the guards. Mooney and the rest of the prisoners escape in a helicopter, although Mooney receives a bullet in the rib.

Bruce (David Mazouz) and Selina (Camren Bicondova) go after Reggie Payne (David O'Hara). They find him in an abandoned warehouse. When Selina threatens to throw his drugs through a window, Payne reveals that the Wayne Enterprises people who sent him to retrieve the files were Molly Mathis and Sid Bunderslaw. Although he tells them everything, Selina throws the drugs out the window. Payne states he will tell Bunderslaw that Bruce is after him. When he tries to retrieve the drugs, Bruce tries to push him through the window but is hesitant. Selina finally throws Payne through the window, killing him.

Bullock interrogates the officer who sent Gordon to go after Fairchild's kidnapper. He finally reveals that Commissioner Loeb (Peter Scolari) sent him to give the case to Gordon. Realizing Lee (Morena Baccarin) may be in danger, Gordon angrily confronts Loeb. He promises that after arresting the Ogre, he'll go after him.

== Reception ==
=== Viewers ===
The episode was watched by 4.50 million viewers, with a 1.5 rating among 18-49 adults. With Live+7 DVR viewing factored in, the episode had an overall rating of 7.13 million viewers, and a 2.6 in the 18–49 demographic.

=== Critical reviews ===
Professional ratings
Review scores
Source	Rating
Rotten Tomatoes (Tomatometer)	64%
Rotten Tomatoes (Average Score)	5.4
IGN	6.7
The A.V. Club	C+
"GamesRadar"	3/5 stars
Paste Magazine	7.0/10.0 stars
TV Fanatic	3.6
New York Magazine	2/5 stars

"Beasts of Prey" received positive reviews. The episode received a rating of 64% with an average score of 5.4 out of 10 on the review aggregator Rotten Tomatoes, with the site's consensus stating: "'Beasts of Prey' introduces an exciting new character arc with the Ogre, even if it strands Fish Mooney on an island of irrelevance."

Matt Fowler of IGN gave the episode a "okay" 6.7 out of 10 and wrote in his verdict, "Gotham returned with a creepy, sick new villain (don't overcook his lamb!), an intriguingly ruthless Commissioner Loeb, and more of the usual Fish Mooney nonsense. The use of flashbacks helped this one a great deal (the first time they were used since "Sign of the Goat," no?). In fact, if flashbacks can help fill up episodes and remove the need to overcrowd chapters with extraneous character check-ins, the show should consider using them more."

The A.V. Club's Kyle Fowle gave the episode a "C+" grade and wrote, "Even on its best days Gotham plays like a collection of footnotes and sidebars to the real Batman show most of us wish we were watching, and there's no clearer example of this than the continuing saga of Fish Mooney on Dollmaker Island. Here's a character with no canonical connection to the Bat-story who now has no connection whatsoever to anything else happening on the show; she's literally off on an island of her own. At least when Fish was in Gotham she had a role to play in the city's underworld power struggle, and by extension Oswald Cobblepot's transformation into the Penguin. Now she's an oddball tangent on a show that already suffers from excessive sprawl."
