= The Blind Fortune Teller =

- Gotham episode
- Episode no.: Season 1 Episode 16
- Directed by: Jeffrey Hunt
- Written by: Bruno Heller
- Production code: 4X6666
- Original air date: February 16, 2015

Guest appearances
- Drew Powell as Butch Gilzean; Morena Baccarin as Dr. Lee Thompkins; Anthony Carrigan as Victor Zsasz; Cameron Monaghan as Jerome Valeska; Mark Margolis as Paul Cicero; Clare Foley as Ivy Pepper; Jeremy Bobb as Owen Lloyd; Slate Holmgren as Alphonse Grayson; Abbi Snee as Mary Lloyd; Robert Gorrie as John Grayson; James Monroe Iglehart as Ringmaster; Dashiell Eaves as Kelly; Elliot Villar as Thomas Schmidt; Carol Kane as Gertrude Kapelput

Episode chronology
← Previous "The Scarecrow"	Next → "Red Hood"

"The Blind Fortune Teller" is the sixteenth episode of the television series Gotham. It premiered on FOX on February 16, 2015 and was written by series developer Bruno Heller, and directed by Jeffrey Hunt. In this episode, James Gordon (Ben McKenzie) and Lee Thompkins (Morena Baccarin) go on a date to Haly's Circus, and end up investigating the murder of one of the performers. Meanwhile, Bruce Wayne (David Mazouz) sets to investigate Wayne Enterprises.

The episode was watched by 6.19 million viewers and received generally positive reviews. While Fish Mooney's storyline was criticized, Cameron Monaghan's performance was universally acclaimed.

== Plot ==
Barbara Kean (Erin Richards) returns to her penthouse apartment to see Selina Kyle (Camren Bicondova) and Ivy Pepper (Clare Foley) squatting there. Selina adds James Gordon (Ben McKenzie) left his keys and Barbara says "screw him". Gordon and Lee Thompkins (Morena Baccarin) have a date at the Haly's Circus. However, during a performance, several performers have a fight between their respective families, the Graysons and Lloyds. Gordon and Lee visit the supposed reason for the fight, snake dancer Lila Valeska, in her trailer only to be received by her son, Jerome (Cameron Monaghan), who reports he had not seen her since the morning. They then discover her corpse in a cart and Gordon accuses the ringmaster (James Monroe Iglehart). The ringmaster admits having discovered the corpse earlier, but did not say anything so as to not interfere with the show, planning on giving her a funeral later.

In the prison, Fish Mooney (Jada Pinkett Smith) acts as the leader of the inmates so they can break free of the prison. When the guards arrive to escort a prisoner for organ harvesting, Mooney has her crew beat the prisoner to death so it's now worthless as an organ donor. When Fish defies the jailer's orders, they say the "manager" would like to talk to her. Alfred Pennyworth (Sean Pertwee) discovers Bruce Wayne (David Mazouz) investigating Wayne Enterprises, claiming he's discovered corruption within the company.

Gordon and Lee then interrogate circus psychic Paul Cicero (Mark Margolis), who claims to hear Lila from "beyond". They bring Jerome too, where Gordon accuses him of murdering Lila, as Cicero had been trying to mislead the police with clues about the murder weapon, and Jim figures he's protecting someone. Jerome denies everything, but when it is revealed that Cicero is his father, he begins to laugh maniacally. He finally admits he killed his mother for being a "whore", and Gordon arrests him. Later, the two warring circus families reconcile when John Grayson and Mary Lloyd get engaged.

Barbara tries to get Gordon back, but changes her mind when she sees him kissing Lee in the police station locker room. In Oswald Cobblepot's nightclub, Victor Zsasz (Anthony Carrigan) visits Cobblepot (Robin Lord Taylor) to tell him that Carmine Falcone is unhappy with how business at the club has been going, and that Oswald may not be the right person to manage the club. Cobblepot seems afraid for his safety, until Victor reveals a brainwashed Butch Gilzean (Drew Powell) and says he is now in service to Cobblepot, having worked on him on "his basement for a few weeks". Bruce visits the Wayne Enterprises board to confront them about the cases of corruption and their involvement in Arkham Plan, although they deny everything. In the prison, the guard Thomas Schmidt (Elliot Villar) tells Mooney that the manager wants to meet with her.

== Reception ==
=== Viewers ===
The episode was watched by 6.19 million viewers, with a 2.1 rating among 18-49 adults. With Live+7 DVR viewing factored in, the episode had an overall rating of 9.25 million viewers, and a 3.4 in the 18–49 demographic.

=== Critical reviews ===
Professional ratings
Review scores
Source	Rating
Rotten Tomatoes (Tomatometer)	61%
Rotten Tomatoes (Average Score)	7.3
IGN	7.3
The A.V. Club	C+
"GamesRadar"	4.5/5 stars
Paste Magazine	7.0
TV Fanatic	3.4/5 stars
New York Magazine	2/5 stars

"The Blind Fortune Teller" received generally positive reviews, especially for Monaghan's performance as a character widely interpreted (but never officially confirmed) as a younger version of the Joker. The episode received a rating of 61% with an average score of 7.3 out of 10 on the review aggregator Rotten Tomatoes, with the site's consensus stating: "The action and use of the ensemble in 'The Blind Fortune Teller' add excitement to an otherwise disappointing introduction of an iconic Batman villain."

The A.V. Club's Kyle Fowle gave the episode a "C+" grade and wrote, "'The Blind Fortune Teller' is another dull, convoluted, poorly-written hour of television, but there are a few performances that stand out. Watching Gotham every week is such a frustrating experience because of how banal the procedural elements are and how shallow and haphazard the narrative is; but it's also frustrating because there are moments when characters shine, or when a certain sequence plays out with wonderful tension and patience. So many episodes of the show have given hints as to what Gotham could be if only it could find some narrative depth and focus, and 'The Blind Fortune Teller' is another one of those episodes."
