= Red Hood (Gotham) =

- Gotham episode
- Episode no.: Season 1 Episode 17
- Directed by: Nathan Hope
- Written by: Danny Cannon
- Production code: 4X6667
- Original air date: February 23, 2015

Guest appearances
- Drew Powell as Butch Gilzean; David O'Hara as Reggie Payne; Jonny Coyne as Clyde Destro; Clare Foley as Ivy Pepper; Sharon Washington as Molly Mathis; Jeffrey Combs as Office Manager; Peter Brensinger as Trope; Jenna Gavigan as Bank Manager's Secretary; Takeo Lee Wong as Chaing

Episode chronology
← Previous "The Blind Fortune Teller"	Next → "Everyone Has a Cobblepot"

"Red Hood" is the seventeenth episode of the television series Gotham. It premiered on FOX on February 23, 2015, and was written by Danny Cannon, and directed by Nathan Hope. In this episode, Gordon (Ben McKenzie) investigates the Red Hood gang, which specializes in heists. Meanwhile, Fish Mooney learns more about the place she may be in.

The episode was watched by 6.53 million viewers and received positive reviews. Critics praised the Red Hood gang and Bruce's storyline.

== Plot ==
The Red Hood Gang, a band of thugs, commit a bank heist. A bank guard shoots at one of them; all miss their mark. Gus Floyd (Michael Goldsmith) wants the public crowd to swarm as a distraction for the arriving police so he tosses part of the loot.

Police investigators Gordon (Ben McKenzie) and Bullock (Donal Logue) review bank surveillance footage. They speculate that there was a test staged of police response time with a smoke bomb and where they could be found since one of the gang wore a Kleg's Auto shop uniform. The gang reconnoiters for the shop and Floyd says that whoever wears the red mask should lead the gang. Gang member Clyde Destro (Jonny Coyne) kills Floyd and takes the mask as a prize. Trope wounds Destro for the mask to impress his girlfriend. Gordon and Bullock discover Floyd's body in a refrigerator at the shop.

Destro is identified by a witness, and Gordon and Bullock use his release as a ploy to trail him to the gang. Destro is wounded by a member of the gang, and the red mask is taken as a prize. Gordon and Bullock find Destro who turns on the gang and reveals all about them. The GCPD get into a shootout and all of the gang are killed.

Fish Mooney (Jada Pinkett Smith) is brought to an office manager (Jeffrey Combs). He says he is not the official owner of the prison as the real doctor, "Dulmacher", is away in Gotham. When he tells her that her eyes would be of high value and tries to extract one, she removes her eye herself with a spoon and steps onto it, making it now worthless.

In Wayne Manor, Alfred (Sean Pertwee) receives the visit from an old SAS friend Reggie Payne (David O'Hara), who had been arrested for sleeping in the streets. Bruce (David Mazouz) lets him stay a few days. However, at night, Payne steals some files from Wayne Enterprises and Bruce's notes. Alfred finds him and while they argue, Payne stabs him and flees. Bruce takes Alfred to the hospital. Payne later gives the information to the Wayne Enterprises board, for which he receives a payment. In the streets, a boy finds the red mask and upon wearing it, he mimics shooting at the police.

== Reception ==
=== Viewers ===
The episode was watched by 6.53 million viewers, with a 2.3 rating among 18-49 adults. With Live+7 DVR viewing factored in, the episode had an overall rating of 9.73 million viewers, and a 3.6 in the 18–49 demographic.

=== Critical reviews ===
Professional ratings
Review scores
Source	Rating
Rotten Tomatoes (Tomatometer)	77%
Rotten Tomatoes (Average Score)	7.4
IGN	7.4
The A.V. Club	B+
"GamesRadar"	4/5 stars
TV Fanatic	3.1/5 stars
New York Magazine	4/5 stars

"Red Hood" received positive reviews. The episode received a rating of 77% with an average score of 7.4 out of 10 on the review aggregator Rotten Tomatoes, with the site's consensus stating: "With 'Red Hood,' Gotham finds its footing as a breeding ground for supervillainy, crusaders, and risk, unafraid to throw in a walloping surprise of grotesque proportions that couldn't be seen coming."

Matt Fowler of IGN gave the episode a "good" 7.4 out of 10 and wrote in his verdict, "Even though the Red Hood gang story will only pay dividends in our minds, it felt more like a fun, harmless one-off rather than a big, heavy 'this is where it all begins' ground zero moment. And I liked that. Also working this week was the visit Alfred and Bruce got from Reggie Payne, as it helped shade in Alfred's past and raise up Wayne Industries as a corporate villain. Fish and Penguin however continued to flounder in stories that, respectively, don't tonally line up and seek to undo established character traits from earlier in the season."

The A.V. Club's Kyle Fowle gave the episode a "B+" grade and wrote, "For perhaps the first time this season, Gotham actually feels like a show that's about the city, and how that city might come to produce not only hardened supervillains, but also a caped vigilante. There are two central storylines that drive the episode, and they share thematic territory. In one storyline, Bullock and Gordon investigate a series of bank robberies executed by the newly-named Red Hood Gang. In another, an old Secret Service buddy of Alfred's tracks him down in the hopes of getting his life back on track. The storylines aren't connected on the surface, but both serves to deepen our understanding of Gotham and the central characters. They both speak to issues of identity, power, and corruption in a meaningful, subtle way, something that the show hasn’t been able to pull off so far this season."
