= Everyone Has a Cobblepot =

- Gotham episode
- Episode no.: Season 1 Episode 18
- Directed by: Bill Eagles
- Written by: Megan Mostyn-Brown
- Production code: 4X6668
- Original air date: March 2, 2015

Guest appearances
- Nicholas D'Agosto as Harvey Dent; Peter Scolari as Commissioner Gillian B. Loeb; Dashiell Eaves as Kelly; Elliott Villar as Thomas Schmidt; Becky Ann Baker as Marge; Dan Ziskie as Jude; Nicholle Tom as Miriam Loeb; Zachary Spicer as Tom Dougherty; Jeffrey Combs as Office Manager; Chelsea Spack as Kristen Kringle; Perry Yung as Xi Lu; Michael J. Burg as Charlie Griggs; Dash Mihok as Det. Arnold Flass; Colm Feore as Dr. Francis Dulmacher

Episode chronology
← Previous "Red Hood"	Next → "Beasts of Prey"

"Everyone Has a Cobblepot" is the eighteenth episode of the television series Gotham. It premiered on FOX on March 2, 2015 and was written by Megan Mostyn-Brown, and directed by Bill Eagles. In this episode, after Commissioner Loeb's (Peter Scolari) controversial moves, Gordon (Ben McKenzie) looks for a solution to the problem. Meanwhile, Fish Mooney (Jada Pinkett Smith) comes face to face with the prison's director.

The episode was watched by 6.10 million viewers and received positive reviews, with critics praising the twist ending and corruption themes.

== Plot ==
Alfred (Sean Pertwee) wakes up in the hospital but refuses to tell James Gordon (Ben McKenzie) that Reggie Payne was responsible for his stabbing. In the prison's nursery, Mooney (Jada Pinkett Smith) is visited by Dr. Francis Dulmacher (Colm Feore). Mooney wants to be his second-hand, based on her experiences with Falcone (John Doman). Dulmacher gives Mooney a new sky-blue irised eye, and the opportunity to prove herself worthy of working as his right-hand woman.

Gordon discovers from Essen (Zabryna Guevara) and Dent (Nicholas D'Agosto) that Commissioner Loeb (Peter Scolari) has released Arnold Flass (Dash Mihok) from jail. When he confronts Loeb, Loeb shows him a video of the witness: Bullock (Donal Logue). Bullock was blackmailed by Loeb because on Falcone's orders, he was directed to kill a rival mobster, and unlike Gordon, he executed the man. Gordon and Dent question an ex-partner of Loeb's, Charlie Griggs (Michael J. Burg), where they get an address for a Triad bookmaker named Xi Lu (Perry Yung).

Gordon and Dent arrive at a Chinese restaurant and find Xi Lu and his bookmaking operations. When Lu denies any involvement, Dent threatens him, which prompts Lu to send his employees to kill them. They're saved by Bullock, who realizes Griggs lied to them. After nearly killing him, Griggs reveals Loeb has ties with Falcone. After receiving help from Cobblepot (Robin Lord Taylor), they arrive at a farm owned by Loeb. There, they find a couple, Jude (Dan Ziskie) and Marge (Becky Ann Baker) keeping the house. Jim and Harvey claim to be inspectors for Loeb, but Jude and Marge open fire which ends with Jude being shot by Bullock and Marge knocked unconscious.

In the attic of the farm house, they discover Loeb's daughter Miriam (Nicholle Tom) locked up. When they question her, she reveals she killed Loeb's wife years before. Gordon then visits Loeb in his office, threatening to expose his lies unless he sends Flass back to jail, and erases Bullock's history. Loeb agrees only with Bullock's terms as ratting out his other blackmailees would endanger his life.

Nygma (Cory Michael Smith) tries to ask Kringle (Chelsea Spack) for a date, but is heartbroken as he realizes she has a boyfriend, Officer Tom Dougherty (Zachary Spicer). Cobblepot brings Jude and Marge to the nightclub so they can get relocated before Loeb kills them. When Cobblepot reveals he only has one getaway ticket to Arizona, Marge kills Jude. Cobblepot then reveals that he lied and kills Marge.

Mooney later sees that Dulmacher altered the office manager's (Jeffrey Combs) body to female parts. She is later forced to give some of the inmates to Dulmacher so that they can come to terms. Later, while in his office, Mooney is shocked when she finds out the prison is on an island, making her escape even more difficult.

== Reception ==
=== Viewers ===
The episode was watched by 6.10 million viewers, with a 2.0 rating among 18-49 adults. With Live+7 DVR viewing factored in, the episode had an overall rating of 9.21 million viewers, and a 3.4 in the 18–49 demographic.

=== Critical reviews ===
Professional ratings
Review scores
Source	Rating
Rotten Tomatoes (Tomatometer)	93%
Rotten Tomatoes (Average Score)	7.4
IGN	7.5
The A.V. Club	B+
"GamesRadar"	4/5 stars
Paste Magazine	7.5
TV Fanatic	2.9 stars on a 5 point scale
New York Magazine	2/5 stars

"Everyone Has a Cobblepot" received positive reviews. The episode received a rating of 93% with an average score of 7.4 out of 10 on the review aggregator Rotten Tomatoes, with the site's consensus stating: "'Everyone Has a Cobblepot' successfully brings together some of Gotham's most popular characters and reveals a number of juicy cliffhangers as it heads into a six-week hiatus."

Matt Fowler of IGN gave the episode a "good" 7.5 out of 10 and wrote in his verdict, "Using Commissioner Loeb as a big target, "Everyone Has a Cobblepot" brought together Gordon, Dent, Bullock, and Penguin for one unified adventure that felt good. Despite the fact that the show often seems to forget the big moments that have already happened on it. As in, Gordon and Bullock already walked into a no-win situation, almost ready to die, in the midseason finale. So while this was a good mission, it still paled in comparison to the danger they faced there. Likewise, it seemed like Gordon already learned his lesson when it came to dealing with Cobblepot. But now it appears he'll have to learn it all over again."

The A.V. Club's Kyle Fowle gave the episode a "B+" grade and wrote, "What largely makes the episode work is that it presents a complex, but not convoluted narrative, which deepens our understanding of a handful of central characters and the city of Gotham. The show has always been billed as one that's not about Batman, but rather about the city that produced the caped crusader. Much of this season hasn't told us anything meaningful about Gotham though, or given us an understanding of the details and personality of the city. By focusing on corruption within the GCPD, and how that corruption extends to the city and its criminal underground, 'Everyone Has a Cobblepot' gives us an understanding of Gotham that's been lacking all season."
