= All Happy Families Are Alike =

- Gotham episode
- Episode no.: Season 1 Episode 22
- Directed by: Danny Cannon
- Written by: Bruno Heller
- Production code: 4X6672
- Original air date: May 4, 2015

Guest appearances
- David Zayas as Salvatore Maroni; Morena Baccarin as Dr. Lee Thompkins; Drew Powell as Butch Gilzean; Peter Scolari as Commissioner Gillian Loeb; Chelsea Spack as Kristen Kringle; Dashiell Eaves as Kelly; James Andrew O'Connor as Tommy Bones

Episode chronology
← Previous "The Anvil or the Hammer"	Next → "Damned If You Do..."

"All Happy Families Are Alike" is the 22nd episode and finale of the first season of the FOX series Gotham. The episode was written by series developer Bruno Heller and directed by Danny Cannon. It was first broadcast on May 4, 2015 in FOX. In this episode, the mob war between Carmine Falcone (John Doman) and Salvatore Maroni (David Zayas) is coming to a brutal end while Oswald Cobblepot and Fish Mooney (Jada Pinkett Smith) face off in their final confrontation, putting James Gordon (Benjamin McKenzie) in the middle of both conflicts. Meanwhile, Bruce Wayne (David Mazouz) sets out to find evidence that his father had a secret life before his death.

== Plot ==
A group of street children, among them Selina, witness the arrival of Fish Mooney and the escapees from Dollmaker's Island. Mooney approaches Selina and states that it will be a "new day". Selina and the children soon join Mooney's gang.

Two weeks later, Bruce becomes convinced his father led a double life and with help from Alfred, he looks through his father's study room. Carmine Falcone is shot during an ambush in the port by Maroni's men and taken to the hospital. At the GCPD, Barbara decides to take trauma counselling from Dr. Leslie Thompkins after the death of her parents at the hands of the Ogre.

Cobblepot and Butch Gilzean arrive at the hospital, intending to kill Falcone. Cobblepot reveals planning the mob war since before making his deal with Falcone. Gordon stops them and handcuffs Cobblepot and Butch to a pipe and frees Falcone. Falcone will need two days in a hideout to find a way to stop the war and Gordon agrees to help him. Cobblepot, realizing Maroni's men are coming and will kill him for his betrayal, pleads with Gordon to free him, citing the favor Gordon owns him. Commissioner Loeb arrives with Maroni's hitmen and orders them to kill Gordon and Falcone. A shootout between Gordon and the hitmen ensues, with Gordon killing the hitmen. With help from Bullock, Gordon, Falcone, Cobblepot, and Gilzean escape in an ambulance.

They get to Falcone's safe house but are taken hostage by Mooney's gang. Mooney is even more furious after noticing Butch's brainwashing treatment delivered by Victor Zsasz and Cobblepot. Mooney makes a trade with Maroni: in exchange for Falcone's head, Maroni will return Mooney's territories. Mooney also plans on killing Cobblepot for brainwashing Butch but spares Bullock's life. However, during the meeting with Maroni, Maroni makes sexist comments about Mooney, which causes her to shoot him in the head. Maroni's and Mooney's gangs then fight, which gives enough time to Falcone, Gordon, and Bullock to escape to a cargo container. Falcone decides he's "done" with business and plans on retiring. Selina's gang recaptures them and bring them back to Mooney. Cobblepot appears with a machine gun and kills some gang members. He then pursues Mooney to the rooftop of the warehouse while Falcone, Gordon and Bullock escape. Meanwhile, during the therapy, Barbara reveals that she murdered her parents, enraged that they never loved her. She then suffers a psychotic breakdown and proceeds to attempt to kill Leslie for stealing her fiancée Gordon. Leslie manages to neutralize Barbara in self-defense just as Gordon, Falcone, and Bullock arrive.

On the rooftop of the warehouse, Mooney and Cobblepot engage in a violent fight. Butch arrives with a gun, but as he was brainwashed to obey Cobblepot and with his loyalty to Mooney, he doesn't know whom to shoot. Unknowingly, he shoots both of them. Mooney forgives Butch for shooting her but Cobblepot insults Butch. He then pushes Mooney to the edge of the rooftop, which makes her fall in the water, seemingly killing her. A shocked Butch watches in horror as Cobblepot climbs to the edge of the rooftop and shouts, "I am the king of Gotham!"

In the GCPD, in the file room, Kristen Kringle reveals to Nygma something she found in the note from "Dougherty": the first letter of each line spells out N-Y-G-M-A, his surname. Nygma denies any knowledge of the letter. When Kringle leaves, he suffers a mental breakdown and talks to an alternate personality that has manifested itself in his mind. Before leaving Gotham, Falcone gives Gordon a knife Gordon's father gave him, stating, "The knife is a good friend when you have no others." In the final scene, Bruce and Alfred find nothing in the study. After Alfred states "none so blind", referring to Marcus Aurelius, Bruce recalls Lucius Fox calling his father "stoic". He finds a book with a device and turns it on, revealing stairs behind the fireplace that lead to a cave, ending the season.

== Production ==
The episode's title is a variation on the opening line from the novel Anna Karenina by Leo Tolstoy: "Happy families are all alike; every unhappy family is unhappy in its own way".

== Reception ==
=== Ratings ===
The episode was watched by 4.93 million viewers. This was an increase in viewership from the previous episode, which was watched by 4.58 million viewers. This made Gotham the most watched program of the day in FOX, beating The Following.

=== Critical reception ===
Professional ratings
Review scores
Source	Rating
Rotten Tomatoes (Tomatometer)	57%
Rotten Tomatoes (Average Score)	7.3
IGN	6.3
The A.V. Club	B
GamesRadar	3.5/5 stars
Paste Magazine	8.5
TV Fanatic	2/5 stars
New York Magazine	2/5 stars

"All Happy Families Are Alike" received mixed reviews from critics but acclaim from fans. The episode received a rating of 59% based on 23 reviews, with an average score of 7.3 out of 10 on the review aggregator Rotten Tomatoes, with the site's consensus stating: "'All Happy Families are Alike' brings season one of Gotham to a somewhat confusing conclusion, but some exciting twists hint at a promising, and hopefully more consistent, season two."

Matt Fowler of IGN gave the episode a "okay" 6.3 out of 10 and wrote in his verdict: "Gotham's Season 1 finale had some cool parts involving a freshly insane Barbara and an unexpected mob death, but the rest of it was so dang sloppy (Fish's attire, Selina joining Fish, Falcone quitting, Butch's brainwashing all of a sudden returning after being ignored for months, etc)."

Darren Orf of EW stated: "Gotham's first season ends much as it lived—with confusion, poorly plotted scenes and by turning a blind eye to everything that makes Batman great. To say 'All Happy Families Are Alike' is a letdown would be to expect too much from this finale to begin with. But after this week's episode finally cuts to black and the credits roll, it’s hard not to feel like the entire first year was a missed opportunity."

The A.V. Club's Kyle Fowle gave the episode a "B" grade and wrote, "The first season of Gotham has been a mess of incomplete or simply terrible ideas, but much of the finale proves that the show does have something to offer when it remains focused. The mob power struggle was dragged out over too many episodes, but the finale boasts a narrative concision that’s promising for the show moving forward. There's hope that after an auspicious start, Gotham has found a bit of footing in the last half of this season. Then again, maybe Penguin is right: 'Hope? It’s for losers.'"
