= Under the Knife (Gotham) =

- Gotham episode
- Episode no.: Season 1 Episode 20
- Directed by: TJ Scott
- Written by: John Stephens
- Production code: 4X6670
- Original air date: April 20, 2015

Guest appearances
- David Zayas as Salvatore "Sal" Maroni; Milo Ventimiglia as Jason Lennon; Morena Baccarin as Dr. Lee Thompkins; Drew Powell as Butch Gilzean; Chelsea Spack as Kristen Kringle; Zachary Spicer as Officer Tom Dougherty; Michael Potts as Sid Bunderslaw; Daniel Davis as Jacob Skolimski; Michael McCormick as Dr. Darren Cushman; Clark Carmichael as Connor; Laurence Mason as Det. Ben Mueller; Carol Kane as Gertrude Kapelput

Episode chronology
← Previous "Beasts of Prey"	Next → "The Anvil or the Hammer"

"Under the Knife" is the twentieth episode of the television series Gotham. It premiered on FOX on April 20, 2015 and was written by John Stephens, and directed by TJ Scott. In this episode, Gordon (Ben McKenzie) and Bullock (Donal Logue) continue to track down The Ogre. Meanwhile, Bruce (David Mazouz) digs deeper into Wayne Enterprises' corrupt board and Nygma (Cory Michael Smith) makes an unexpected move.

The episode was watched by 4.44 million viewers and received positive reviews for The Ogre's and Bruce's storyline.

== Plot ==
Feeling The Ogre may be coming for Lee (Morena Baccarin), Gordon (Ben McKenzie) unsuccessfully tries to convince her to leave town. In a bar, Lennon (Milo Ventimiglia) has a new date: Barbara (Erin Richards). He plans to kill her in her penthouse but decides not to after he realizes she feels lonely and depressed. Not comfortable with him, she tells him to go.

Gordon and Bullock (Donal Logue) interrogate the first victim of The Ogre's revenge, Detective Ben Mueller (Laurence Mason), whose wife was killed by The Ogre. They're then cornered by The Ogre, who then calls Gordon and threatens to kill someone unless he retires from the investigation. While inspecting a manor, they save a butler, Jacob Skolimski (Daniel Davis) from being hanged and discover the corpse of Constance Van Groot. They realize the Ogre is called Jason Skolimski, the son of Jacob and Constance Van Groot (the foster mother), who killed her for not being a good mother.

Bruce (David Mazouz) and Selina (Camren Bicondova) continue their investigation in Wayne Enterprises. Accompanied by Barbara, they attend Wayne Enterprises' Charity Ball. While Bruce distracts Sid Bunderslaw (Michael Potts), the director of Physical Operations, Selina steals Bunderslaw's keys to make a copy. Cobblepot (Robin Lord Taylor) is forced to have dinner with Maroni (David Zayas) and his mother Gertrude (Carol Kane). While talking, Maroni reveals to Gertrude that his son has killed many people. Cobblepot swears to kill him.

While looking for files, Nygma (Cory Michael Smith) discover Kringle (Chelsea Spack) has bruises in her arm from Dougherty (Zachary Spicer). Nygma confronts Dougherty outside Kringle's apartment, Dougherty begins to beat him but Nygma accidentally stabs him. Realizing he would implicate him, Ed is forced to stab him to death. Gordon realizes Barbara was with him on a photograph in the last Ball, realizing The Ogre is with Barbara. In his home, Lennon introduces Barbara to a room of BDSM and torture tools.

== Reception ==
=== Viewers ===
The episode was watched by 4.44 million viewers, with a 1.6 rating among 18-49 adults. With Live+7 DVR viewing factored in, the episode had an overall rating of 7.28 million viewers, and a 2.7 in the 18–49 demographic.

=== Critical reviews ===
Professional ratings
Review scores
Source	Rating
Rotten Tomatoes (Tomatometer)	77%
Rotten Tomatoes (Average Score)	6.7
IGN	7.3
The A.V. Club	C
GamesRadar	4/5 stars
TV Fanatic	3.9/5 stars
New York Magazine	3/5 stars

"Under the Knife" received positive reviews. The episode received a rating of 77% with an average score of 6.7 out of 10 on the review aggregator Rotten Tomatoes, with the site's consensus stating: "Gotham finds the right mix of creepy and fun, even when the plot of 'Under the Knife' spreads the characters a bit too thin."

Matt Fowler of IGN gave the episode a "good" 7.3 out of 10 and wrote in his verdict, "With no Fish to follow (yay!) Gotham actually figured out a way to insert Barbara back into the story in an intriguing way. She could have just been a victim of the Ogre. Or someone that Gordon needed to save (again). But they chose to make her somewhat of a broken kindred spirit. Does she know what she's getting herself into? Probably not. But it'd be even cooler if she did."

The A.V. Club's Kyle Fowle gave the episode a "C" grade and wrote, "Now, through two episodes post-break, and with only two more to go, Gotham appears to be falling back into the pattern that’s defined most of this season, which involves convoluted storylines that stretch the characters (and audience’s patience) thin and rely far too much on exposition to move the plot along."
