= The Anvil or the Hammer =

- Gotham episode
- Episode no.: Season 1 Episode 21
- Directed by: Paul Edwards
- Written by: Jordan Harper
- Production code: 4X6671
- Original air date: April 27, 2015

Guest appearances
- David Zayas as Salvatore "Sal" Maroni; Milo Ventimiglia as Jason Lennon; Morena Baccarin as Dr. Lee Thompkins; Drew Powell as Butch Gilzean; Chris Chalk as Lucius Fox; Chelsea Spack as Kristen Kringle; Michael Potts as Sid Bunderslaw; Caroline Lagerfelt as Mrs. Kean; Richard Poe as Mr. Kean; Clark Carmichael as Connor; James Andrew O'Connor as Tommy Bones; Barbara Rosenblat as Lidia Bicchieri; Tonya Glanz as Sally; April Yvette Thompson as Lucy

Episode chronology
← Previous "Under the Knife"	Next → "All Happy Families Are Alike"

"The Anvil or the Hammer" is the 21st episode of the television series Gotham. It premiered on FOX on April 27, 2015, and was written by Jordan Harper, and directed by Paul Edwards. In this episode, Gordon (Ben McKenzie) goes after The Ogre (Milo Ventimiglia), who is playing with Barbara's (Erin Richards) mind. Cobblepot (Robin Lord Taylor) continues to push the mob war even further.

The episode was watched by 4.58 million viewers and received mixed-to-positive reviews with critics praising the plot twist but criticizing the lack of plot advancement.

== Plot ==
Shortly after Jason "The Ogre" Lennon reveals his true intentions to Barbara and holds her captive, he tells her, at knifepoint, to choose his next victim. During the investigation at the Foxglove Club, Gordon and Bullock locate the "Ogre's" apartment at Gotham Royal Hotel, but he and Barbara had already left for her parents' mansion, and both are killed. Nygma disposes of officer Dougherty's body in the forensic lab and pens a letter for Kringle, posing as Dougherty, explaining that he left town. Nygma leaves his name secretly hidden in the letter to Kringle as a clue.

Bruce sneaks into Bunderslaw's office at Wayne Enterprises and opens his safe, which is empty. Bunderslaw himself arrives and reveals that he was expecting Bruce, and has consequently removed the incriminating documents. He confesses to Bruce that his father and grandfather knew about illegal activities in the company, but decided to keep quiet. Afterwards, Bunderslaw orders Lucius Fox (Chris Chalk) to lead Bruce away. Lucius subtly tells Bruce that while Bruce's father knew of the illegal activities, he did not approve of them.

The O'Connor assassination attempt is revealed to be a set-up designed by Cobblepot to start a war between Falcone and Maroni. Gordon and Bullock arrive at the house of Barbara's parents to find them dead.

After a brutal fight with Jim, the "Ogre" holds Barbara at knifepoint until Bullock distracts him for Jim to shoot him. Later, Jim confesses to Leslie that he no longer loves Barbara. Consumed with guilt, Bruce confesses his and Selina's murder of Reggie to Alfred, eventually also admitting to his visit to Bunderslaw. After Alfred tells Bruce that his father was a good man, Bruce states that even good men can have dark secrets.

Several crimes and killings committed by Maroni and his crew alert Captain Essen, who calls all officers of the GCPD to remain on duty during the upcoming gang war.

== Reception ==
=== Viewers ===
The episode was watched by 4.58 million viewers, with a 1.5 rating among 18-49 adults. With Live+7 DVR viewing factored in, the episode had an overall rating of 7.23 million viewers, and a 2.6 in the 18–49 demographic.

=== Critical reviews ===
Professional ratings
Review scores
Source	Rating
Rotten Tomatoes (Tomatometer)	60%
Rotten Tomatoes (Average Score)	6.7
IGN	6.6
The A.V. Club	B−
GamesRadar	3.5/5 stars
Paste Magazine	6.5
TV Fanatic	3.5/5 stars
New York Magazine	2/5 stars

"The Anvil or the Hammer" received mixed-to-positive reviews. The episode received a rating of 60% with an average score of 6.7 out of 10 on the review aggregator Rotten Tomatoes, with the site's consensus stating: "Though the plot twist was surprising, 'The Anvil or the Hammer' disregarded Gotham's own history, muddying up the narrative with a nonsensical story."

Matt Fowler of IGN gave the episode a "okay" 6.6 out of 10 and wrote in his verdict, "A sloppy, silly penultimate episode took us through a parade of familiar beats as Gotham now heads into its season finale. The highlight here was that something actually horrifying happened to Barbara. Something that may may make her snap entirely. Certainly a far cry from the time she was held comfortably captive by Falcone and fed fresh-baked muffins."

The A.V. Club's Kyle Fowle gave the episode a "B−" grade and wrote, "In fact, much of 'The Anvil Or The Hammer' signals a way forward for Gotham, giving us moments that prove this show can be more than a lackluster procedural. The multi-episode arc of the Ogre is the most obvious strength here. It proves that Gotham is better off without it's [sic] case-of-the-week structure, instead choosing to focus on a long-term narrative, rolling out storylines that have consequences in the future and allow the characters to experience something resembling growth."
