= Selina Kyle (Gotham episode) =

- Gotham episode
- Episode no.: Season 1 Episode 2
- Directed by: Danny Cannon
- Written by: Bruno Heller
- Production code: 4X6652
- Original air date: September 29, 2014

Guest appearances
- Lili Taylor as Patti; Richard Kind as Mayor Aubrey James; Drew Powell as Butch Gilzean; Wayne Duvall as Morry Quillan; Kyle Massey as Mackey; Joe Starr as Arbogast; Joseph Latimore as Detective; Carol Kane as Gertrude Kapelput; Frank Whaley as Doug

Episode chronology
← Previous "Pilot"	Next → "The Balloonman"

"Selina Kyle" is the second episode of the television series Gotham. It premiered on FOX on September 29, 2014 and was written by series developer Bruno Heller and directed by Danny Cannon. In the episode, Gordon (Benjamin McKenzie) and Bullock (Donal Logue) investigate a child trafficking ring in Gotham City while Cobblepot (Robin Lord Taylor) begins to make his way back to Gotham, leaving victims in his path.

The episode was watched by 7.45 million viewers and received positive reviews, with some considering it an improvement from the pilot.

== Plot ==
In the streets, two people Patti (Lili Taylor) and Doug (Frank Whaley), pretending to be volunteers from the Mayor's Homeless Outreach Project, kidnap two kids and kill a homeless war veteran while a third kid, Mackey (Kyle Massey), escapes. Doug follows him until he accidentally throws Mackey in a restaurant window, forcing him to flee. Gordon (Ben McKenzie) and Bullock (Donal Logue) investigate the war veteran and interrogate Mackey, although Bullock is skeptical of his testimony. Meanwhile, Cobblepot (Robin Lord Taylor) makes his way back to Gotham City hitchhiking. Two boys pick him up and give him a beer, but when the passenger tells him he walks like a "penguin", he kills him, and keeps the driver, bound and gagged with duct tape, as a hostage.

In the GCPD, forensic scientist Edward Nygma (Cory Michael Smith) reveals a high level of ATP on Mackey, which prompts Captain Sarah Essen (Zabryna Guevara) to order Gordon and Bullock to investigate but not to reveal any information to the media. Montoya (Victoria Cartagena) and Allen (Andrew Stewart-Jones) investigate Cobblepot's disappearance and upon interrogating his mother, Gertrude Kapelput (Carol Kane), they deduce he was killed by Mooney and the corrupt cops.

Don Falcone (John Doman) talks with Fish Mooney (Jada Pinkett Smith) telling her Cobblepot told him she was going to turn against him. While talking with Butch Gilzean (Drew Powell), Mooney plans on killing Falcone. When Gordon shows his frustration to his fiancee, Barbara Kean (Erin Richards), she gives the information to the press as an anonymous tip. Gordon and Bullock ambush Patti and Doug in a facility and although they escape, they rescue the children.

Mayor Aubrey James (Richard Kind) decides to send the kids to the juvenile service. However, the bus where the children (including Selina) are held is taken by Patti and Doug. They take them to a storage container, planning on sending them to "Dollmaker". After trying to get Selina, they're captured by Gordon and Bullock after receiving a tip from their worker, Morry Quillan (Wayne Duvall). In the station, Selina reveals to Gordon she saw who killed the Waynes in the alley.

== Reception ==
=== Ratings ===
The pilot was watched by 7.45 million viewers, with a 2.8 rating among 18-49 adults. With Live+7 DVR viewing factored in, the episode had an overall rating of 11.81 million viewers, and a 4.7 in the 18–49 demographic.

=== Critical reception ===
Professional ratings
Review scores
Source	Rating
Rotten Tomatoes	72%
The A.V. Club	C−
Paste Magazine	6.5
TV Fanatic	3.7/5 stars
IGN	7.6
Den of Geek	2.5/5 stars
New York Magazine	3/5 stars

"Selina Kyle" was well received by critics. The episode received a rating of 72% on the review aggregator Rotten Tomatoes based on 25 reviews, with the site's consensus stating: "An improvement over the pilot episode, Gotham's 'Selina Kyle' gives a handful of its characters some much-needed development, further distinguishing it from other incarnations of the Batman universe."

Matt Fowler of IGN gave the episode a "good" 7.6 out of 10 and wrote in his verdict, "Gotham still has hurdles to overcome, but 'Selina Kyle' felt more like the show was trying to do its own thing, and spin its own stories, than the premiere. Still, the cops are almost too corrupt and the bad guys made some weird, bonehead moves that brought the episode to a halt a few times. But Jada Pinkett Smith and Robin Lord Taylor are still doing great work as Fish Mooney and Cobblepot. And right now I like the crime lord power struggle more than the "cops and robbers" stuff. Though the Dollmaker looming in the shadows was a nice touch and Gordon and Bullock's rapport has improved."

The A.V. Club's Oliver Sava gave the episode a "C−" grade and wrote, "Gotham needs to find the correct balance of those two governing elements in order to succeed, but more importantly, it needs to start delving into the characters in a real emotional way. The show has to stop telling us how characters feel and start showing us how they feel, because after two episodes, none of the relationships or conflicts feel fully formed. Who are these characters when they're not working? Who are they outside of their connection to a vigilante who won't appear for years in this world? Once the show starts committing to answers for these questions, it might pull itself out of the hole dug by these first two chapters."
