= Willa Fitzgerald =

American actress (born 1991)

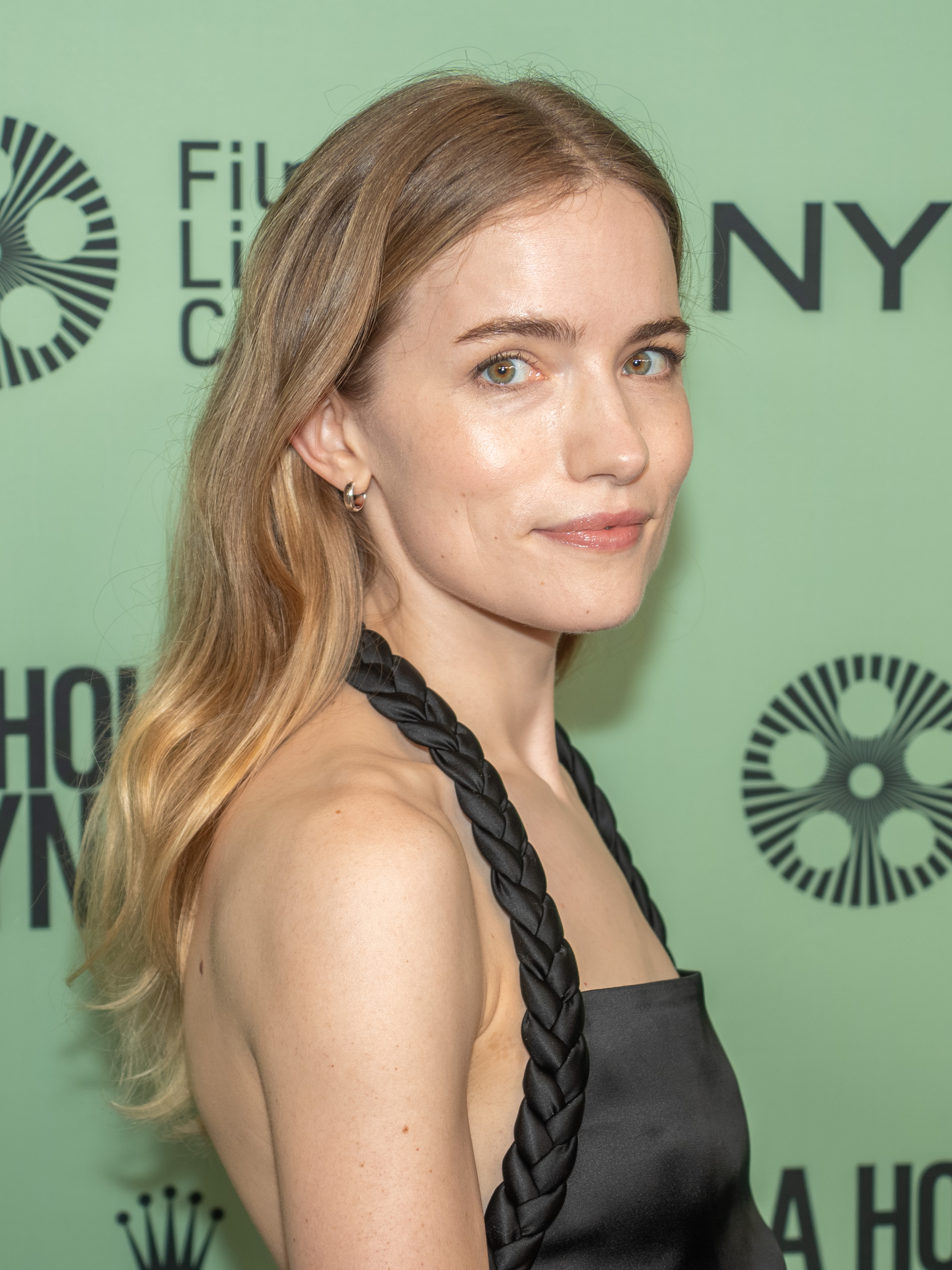
- Fitzgerald in 2025
- Born: January 17, 1991 (age 35); Nashville, Tennessee, U.S.
- Education: Yale University (BA)
- Occupation: Actress
- Years active: 2008–present

Willa Fitzgerald (born January 17, 1991) is an American actress. She is known for her starring role as Emma Duval in MTV's Scream. She has played cheer coach Colette French in the USA Network's television drama series Dare Me and officer Roscoe Conklin in the Amazon Prime Video television series Reacher. Her other notable roles include Amazon Studios' television series Alpha House, the USA Network's drama series Royal Pains, Netflix's horror miniseries The Fall of the House of Usher, and the lead role in the thriller film Strange Darling.

== Early life ==
Willa Fitzgerald was born on January 17, 1991, in Nashville, Tennessee, the only child of musician parents who were in a band together for two decades prior to her birth.

After first studying psychology for three years, Fitzgerald earned her bachelor's degree in theater studies from Yale University.

== Career ==
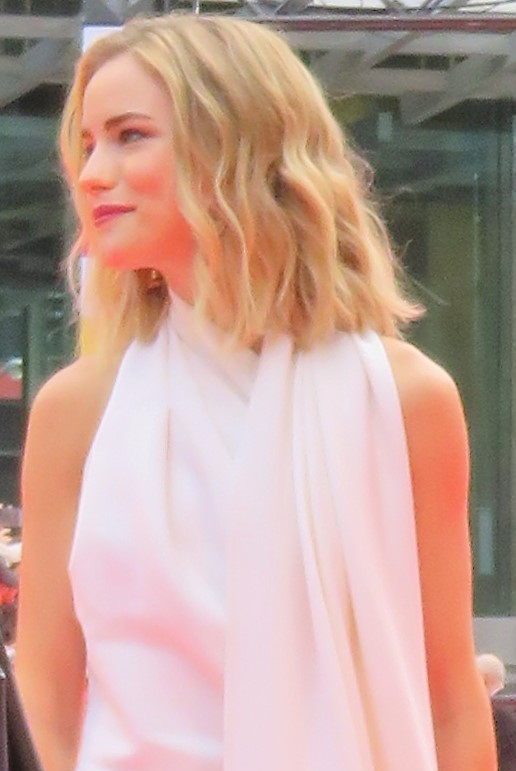
Fitzgerald in 2019

Between 2013 and 2014, Fitzgerald played the role of Lola Laffer in the Amazon Studios political web television series Alpha House. The series lasted two seasons before being cancelled. On April 23, 2014, it was reported that Fitzgerald obtained a recurring role in USA Network's drama series Royal Pains as Emma Miller. Between 2014 and 2015, she also obtained guest-starring roles in various television series such as Blue Bloods, The Following and Gotham.

On August 5, 2014, she was cast in MTV's Scream. On July 29, 2015, the series was renewed for a second season that premiered on May 30, 2016. On April 26, 2017, MTV announced that Scream would undergo a reboot featuring a new cast.

Fitzgerald's credits in theater include works such as Couple in the Kitchen, The Private Sector, Cow Play and The Cat and the Canary. In August 2016, she joined the cast of the film Misfortune, directed by Lucky McKee and released in October 2017 under the title Blood Money.

In January 2016, she was cast in the go90 web series Relationship Status. She portrayed the role of Beth in a two-episode arc.

In March 2017, Fitzgerald was cast in a starring role in the Fox television pilot Behind Enemy Lines, playing Navy pilot Roxanne Daly, though Fox passed on the pilot in May 2017. In July 2017, Fitzgerald was cast to play Meg in the BBC miniseries Little Women based on Louisa May Alcott's novel of the same name. It premiered on Boxing Day, 2017.

In November 2017, she was cast as the lead of E!'s pilot #Fashionvictim as Anya St. Clair. In March 2018, the pilot was not commissioned to go forward with E!. In December 2017, she was cast to play Kitsey Barbour in The Goldfinch based on Donna Tartt's Pulitzer Prize-winning book of the same name, which was released on September 13, 2019.

In July 2018, Fitzgerald was cast as one of the lead roles in the USA Network drama pilot Dare Me, which was picked up to series in January 2019. On April 30, 2020, the series was canceled after one season. In December 2018, Fitzgerald was cast in an episode of the Netflix anthology drama series, Heartstrings. The series premiered on November 22, 2019. In April 2019, it was announced that Fitzgerald would guest star in the sixth season of the TV Land comedy-drama series Younger.

In March 2021, she was cast as officer Roscoe Conklin in the first season of the Amazon Prime Video series Reacher, which premiered in February 2022. In June 2022, she was announced to star in Steven Brand's noir thriller Joe Baby.

== Filmography ==
=== Film ===
Year	Title	Role	Notes	Ref.
2008	For the Love of a Dog	Vivian		
2017	Freak Show	Tiffany		
2017	Blood Money	Lynn	originally titled Misfortune	
2018	Beach House	Emma		
2019	The Goldfinch	Kitsey Barbour		
2021	18½	Connie		
2022	Savage Salvation	Ruby Red		
2023	Desperation Road	Maben		
2023	Strange Darling	the Lady		
2023	Wildcat	Elizabeth Hardwick		
2024	Relay	Rosetti		
2024	Joe Baby	Heather Stanton		
2025	Alarum	Agent Lara Travers		
2025	A House of Dynamite	Abby Jansing		
2025	Regretting You	Jenny Davidson		
2027	Skeletons		Post-production	
TBA	Billion Dollar Spy	Mae Lenihan	Post-production	
TBA	Callback		Post-production	
TBA	New England Toys		Post-production	

=== Television ===
Year	Title	Role	Notes	Ref.
2013–2014	Alpha House	Lola Laffer	Recurring role; 12 episodes (seasons 1–2)	
2014	The Novice	Lucy Griego	Unsold television pilot	
2014	Blue Bloods	Lacey Sutherland	Episode: "The Bogeyman"	
2014	The Following	Jenny	Episode: "Betrayal"	
2014	Royal Pains	Emma Miller	Recurring role; 13 episodes (season 6)	
2014	Untitled Wall Street Project	Tara Conklin	Unsold television pilot	
2015	Gotham	Grace Fairchild	Episode: "Beasts of Prey"	
2015–2016	Scream	Emma Duval	Lead role; 23 episodes (seasons 1–2)	
2017	Bull	Susan Bryant	Episode: "Teacher's Pet"	
2017	Behind Enemy Lines	Roxanne Daly	Unsold television pilot	
2017	Little Women	Meg March	Miniseries; 3 episodes	
2018	#Fashionvictim	Anya St. Clair	Unsold television pilot	
2018	House of Cards	Twenty-Year-Old Claire	Episodes: "Chapter 72" and "Chapter 73"	
2019	Law & Order: Special Victims Unit	Ava Parcell	Episode: "Plastic"	
2019	Younger	Audrey Colbert	Episodes: "The Unusual Suspect" and "Merger, She Wrote"	
2019	Heartstrings	Maddie Hawkins	Episode: "J.J. Sneed"	
2019–2020	Dare Me	Colette French	Main role; 10 episodes	
2020	Billions	Jill	Episode: "The Limitless Sh*t"	
2022	Reacher	Roscoe Conklin	Main role; 8 episodes (season 1)	
2023	The Fall of the House of Usher	Young Madeline Usher	Miniseries; 8 episodes	
2025	Pulse	Dr. Danielle "Danny" Simms	Main role; 10 episodes	

=== Music videos ===
Year	Title	Artist(s)	Ref.
2024	"Dark"	Maya Hawke	

=== Web series ===
Year	Title	Role	Notes
2016	Relationship Status	Beth	Episodes: "The Friends" and "The Good Guy"
2016	Scream: If I Die	Emma Duval	Episode: "One Surprise Left"
2020	Acting for a Cause	Hamlet	Episode: "Hamlet"
2020	Day by Day	Narrator	Voice role; episode: "Closed Germ Loop"
