= Brette Taylor =

American actress, producer & singer-songwriter

- Born: Cincinnati, Ohio, U.S.
- Occupations: Actress, Producer, Singer-Songwriter
- Years active: 1988–present
- Website: https://brette-taylor.com/

Brette Taylor is an American actress, producer and country music singer-songwriter.

Taylor was born in Cincinnati and raised in NYC. She graduated High School of Performing Arts and also studied with the Cincinnati Ballet Preparatory Company at the University of Cincinnati – College-Conservatory of Music.

She began her acting career in theater, television and film, including guest-starring appearances in the multiple episodes in the Law & Order franchise, Spin City, Numb3rs and Unforgettable. She had the recurring role in the FX series, Rescue Me in 2007. Also in 2007, she released her debut studio album Breaking News. In film, she had a supporting role in Laws of Attraction opposite Julianne Moore.

In 2014, Taylor was cast as Martha Wayne in the pilot episode of Fox series, Gotham. Later in that year she joined the cast of the ABC drama series, Nashville, recurring as Deacon's feisty muse, Pam York.

== Filmography ==
Film
| Year | Title | Role | Notes |
|---|---|---|---|
| 1993 | Above The Law | Casting Assoc. | Feature |
| 1995 | Melissa | Amanda | Feature |
| 1998 | Perfect Lies | Toby | |
| 1998 | Return to Paradise | Young Woman in Limo | |
| 2001 | Do You Wanna Know a Secret? | Joan | 2 Episodes: "Blind Eye For Hire" |
| 2002 | Brown Sugar | Woman | |
| 2002 | Town Diary | Veronica | |
| 2004 | Laws of Attraction | Mary Harrison | |
| 2004 | Knots | Emily | |
| 2005 | Spit | Charlene | Short film |
| 2005 | Fortunes | Jessica | |
| 2005 | Stealing Martin Lane | Catherine | |
| 2015 | Officer Down | A.D.A Loughlin | Feature |
| 2020 | Windows To Nowhere | Elise | |
| 2022 | Just Deal With It | Georgia | |
| 2022 | Babs | Det. Becky Rawlings | Writer | Producer | Director |
| 2022 | Soul to Keep | Heather Stinson | Feature |

Television
| Year | Title | Role | Notes |
|---|---|---|---|
| 1995 | Law & Order | Natalie | Episode: "Switch" |
| 1995 | Law & Order | Celia Gaston | Episode: "Jeopardy" |
| 1997 | Spin City | Margo | 2 Episode" "My Life is a Soap Opera" "Bye, Bye Bird" |
| 1998 | Sins of the City | Joan | Episode: "Do You Wanna Know a Secret" |
| 2003 | Law & Order: Special Victims Unit | Mrs. Dutton | Episode: "Soulless" |
| 2004 | All My Children | Pamela | Recurring role |
| 2005 | Rescue Me | Debbie | Recurring role, 6 episodes |
| 2006 | Law & Order: Criminal Intent | Sammie | Episode: "Slither" |
| 2007 | Numb3rs | Catherine Walton | Episode: "Burn Rate" |
| 2009 | The Beast | Karen Maguire | Episode: "Pilot" |
| 2009 | The Beautiful Life: TBL | Gwen | 2 Episode: "The Beautiful Aftermath" "The Beautiful Lie" |
| 2014 | Unforgettable | Eileen Brenner | Episode: "Til Death" |
| 2014-2019 | Gotham | Martha Wayne | Recurring role, 6 episodes |
| 2014 | Nashville | Pam York | Recurring role, 6 episodes |
| 2019 | #Wargames | Lt. Elizabeth Grant | Recurring Interactive Series |
| 2019 | Prodigal Son | Blair Berkhead | Episode: "Pilot" |
