= Viper (Gotham) =

- Gotham episode
- Episode no.: Season 1 Episode 5
- Directed by: Tim Hunter
- Written by: Rebecca Perry Cutter
- Production code: 4X6655
- Original air date: October 20, 2014

Guest appearances
- David Zayas as Salvatore "Sal" Maroni; Makenzie Leigh as Liza; Danny Mastrogiorgio as Frankie Carbone; Daniel London as Stan Potolsky; Kett Turton as Benny; Genevieve Hudson-Price as Charmagne; Peter Maloney as Isaac Steiner; Sharon Washington as Molly Mathis; Jeremy Davidson as Nikolai; Margaret Colin as Taylor Reece

Episode chronology
← Previous "Arkham"	Next → "Spirit of the Goat"

"Viper" is the fifth episode of the television series Gotham. It premiered on FOX on October 20, 2014 and was written by Rebecca Perry Cutter and directed by Tim Hunter. In the episode, detectives Gordon (Ben McKenzie) and Bullock (Donal Logue) are investigating a new street drug that causes euphoria and then death. Meanwhile, Cobblepot (Robin Lord Taylor) works his way deeper into Maroni’s (David Zayas) inner circle and Fish Mooney (Jada Pinkett Smith) continues to plot to take down Falcone (John Doman).

The episode was watched by 6.09 million viewers but received mixed reviews, mostly for lack of character development.

== Plot ==
Bruce (David Mazouz) plans to find a way to speak to the board members of Wayne Enterprises to learn their connections to the Arkham District Project. Later, a new drug called "Viper" (which is a prototype of Venom) is hitting the street, which endows users with super-strength but eventually kills them by draining their bone cartilage. Maroni plans to rob a casino owned by Falcone (John Doman), and Cobblepot (Robin Lord Taylor) reveals his past which results in Maroni assaulting him, and Frankie confronts Gordon, telling him to come with him or else he will reveal that Cobblepot is still alive, which could put his life in danger if Falcone were to learn about it. Gordon (Ben McKenzie) and Bullock (Donal Logue) learn that "Viper" is being distributed at a charity event held by WellZyn and Wayne Enterprises, which is targeted by former WellZyn employee Stan Potolsky (Daniel London), who is planning to reveal Wellzyn's involvement with "Viper" by exposing it to everyone present. Gordon shoots the canister on the roof and Potolsky is exposed, jumping off as he suggests they check out Warehouse 39, where Gordon and Bullock later find nothing. During their search, a WellZyn board member was watching them from afar. As Mooney (Jada Pinkett Smith) makes plans to conspire against Falcone with her lover and Russian mob boss Nikolai, a disguised Liza (Makenzie Leigh) visits Falcone in the park, where she bonds with him while sharing her supposed love for Giacomo Puccini's aria "O Mio Babbino Caro."

== Reception ==
=== Viewers ===
The episode was watched by 6.09 million viewers, with a 2.3 rating among 18-49 adults. With Live+7 DVR viewing factored in, the episode had an overall rating of 10.12 million viewers, and a 4.0 in the 18–49 demographic.

=== Critical reviews ===
Professional ratings
Review scores
Source	Rating
Rotten Tomatoes (Tomatometer)	62%
The A.V. Club	C
Paste Magazine	7.0
TV Fanatic	3.5/5 stars
IGN	7.8
New York Magazine	2/5 stars

"Viper" received mixed reviews. The episode received a rating of 62% on review aggregator Rotten Tomatoes based on reviews from 26 critics, with the site's consensus stating: "While 'Viper' adds some much-appreciated Batman mythology to its origin story, Gotham struggles to figure out what kind of show it's going to be."

Matt Fowler of IGN gave the episode a "good" 7.8 out of 10 and wrote in his verdict, "Gotham is still figuring itself out but I think setting Wayne Enterprises itself as possibly the 'big bad' of the series was a nice step. The gang feud continues to interest me while the cases-of-the-week continue to more or less feel arbitrary and, at times, unnecessary. But at least this week's played into the larger Wayne corruption angle while also introducing the important visual of green serum and green gas to the show. I hope that the series will find the confidence to, at one point, take a break from some of the stories and not feature everything/everyone in each episode."

The A.V. Club's Oliver Sava gave the episode a "C" grade and wrote, "The show has offered tiny crumbs in regards to these questions: Jim has a strict moral code forged during his time as a hero soldier; Harvey is complacent because he's afraid of what would happen to him if he wasn't; Fish and Oswald are both disrespected and condescended to by their superiors. But Gotham needs to give us more, and every week we get another fantastical mystery of the week instead of the grounded character development a successful cop show needs.
