= Pilot (Gotham) =

- Gotham episode
- Episode no.: Season 1 Episode 1
- Directed by: Danny Cannon
- Written by: Bruno Heller
- Production code: 276072
- Original air date: September 22, 2014

Guest appearances
- John Doman as Carmine Falcone; Richard Kind as Mayor Aubrey James; Victoria Cartagena as Renee Montoya; Andrew Stewart-Jones as Crispus Allen; Drew Powell as Butch Gilzean; Daniel Stewart Sherman as Mario Pepper; Michael Kostroff as Officer Tannenbaum; Grayson McCouch as Dr. Thomas Wayne; Brette Taylor as Martha Wayne; Clare Foley as Ivy Pepper; Victor Cruz as Desk Sergeant; Jon Beavers as Comedian

Episode chronology
← Previous —	Next → "Selina Kyle"

"Pilot" is the first episode of the television series Gotham. It premiered on FOX on September 22, 2014 and was written by series developer Bruno Heller and directed by Danny Cannon. The episode, and the series as a whole, are based on characters appearing in and published by DC Comics in the Batman franchise, primarily those of James Gordon and Bruce Wayne. FOX gave the pilot a straight-to-series order with an order of 16 episodes.

The pilot was watched by 8.21 million viewers, a strong number and received generally positive reviews for its acting and plot, but received criticism for its pace and subplots.

== Plot ==
Selina Kyle (Camren Bicondova) is prowling through Gotham City. After stealing a carton of milk and a wallet, she flees into an alley and hides in a fire escape. She watches Thomas (Grayson McCouch) and Martha Wayne (Brette Taylor) with their son Bruce (David Mazouz) walking through the alley as they are walking home from seeing a movie. An unknown assailant approaches them, demanding Martha's pearl necklace and Thomas' wallet. After being given these items, the assailant shoots Thomas and Martha, leaving Bruce shocked in front of his parents' bodies while Selina watches.

Rookie detective James "Jim" Gordon (Ben McKenzie) and his partner, Harvey Bullock (Donal Logue) are sent to investigate the crime scene. Although he is traumatized, Bruce tells Gordon what happened. Then, the Waynes’ butler, Alfred Pennyworth (Sean Pertwee), arrives to take Bruce home. Gordon talks with Bruce and promises to capture the killer. The detectives have no clues; so, they go to see Fish Mooney (Jada Pinkett Smith), an underling of Mafia Don Carmine Falcone (John Doman), but they receive no information.

The next day, Bullock calls Gordon after getting a lead in the case. The suspect, Mario Pepper (Daniel Stewart Sherman) flees from the apartment and nearly kills Gordon with a knife until Bullock fatally shoots him in the chest. During an inspection of the Pepper residence, they find the pearl necklace. As a result, Gordon and Bullock receive acclaim from the media for apparently solving the case. However, a low-level mobster Oswald "Penguin" Cobblepot (Robin Lord Taylor) gives information to Major Crimes Unit investigators Renee Montoya (Victoria Cartagena) and Crispus Allen (Andrew Stewart-Jones) revealing Mooney framed Pepper for the murder. Montoya thinks Gordon and the Gotham City Police Department (GCPD) are corrupt and plans on bringing them down.

Realizing Pepper is innocent, Gordon confronts Mooney, only to be kidnapped. Bullock goes to save his partner, and is knocked out and tied up by Mooney's bodyguard, Butch Gilzean (Drew Powell). Meanwhile, Mooney confronts Cobblepot and beats him with a baseball bat for being an informant. Gordon and Bullock are saved by Don Falcone, who says Mooney should ask him first to kill a cop. Falcone then reveals he saved Gordon due to a prior mutually respectful relationship he had with Peter Gordon, Jim's father. When Gordon accuses Falcone of killing the Waynes, Falcone retorts that it would not be in his financial interest to do so while also tacitly admitting to his compliance in framing Pepper.

To show his adherence to the corruption going on within Gotham City, Gordon is ordered by Falcone to kill Cobblepot at the Gotham Docks. Gordon fakes Cobblepot's death by throwing him in the river, telling him to never come back to Gotham. Gordon visits Bruce in his Manor, revealing Pepper was framed and promises to find the real killer. As he exits Wayne Manor, Selina is seen on an outside wall. The episode ends with Cobblepot climbing out of the river and killing a fisherman to steal his sandwich.

== Production ==
=== Development ===
Bruno Heller, a fan of Batman, has been talking to DC Comics Chief Creative Officer Geoff Johns to discuss a potential Batman series. According to Heller: "It opened up a whole world of storytelling that we realized hadn't really been looked at before, which is the world before Batman -- the world of Gotham, young Bruce Wayne, and young James Gordon and the origin stories of the villains".

In September 2013, Fox bypassed the traditional pilot phase and placed a straight-to-series order for "Gotham", to be written and executive produced by Heller. "Gotham" received a series order from Fox on May 5 the following year, with the first season reported to consist of 16 episodes, rather than the standard 13 or 22.

Fox's Chairman of Entertainment Kevin Reilly commented on the number of episodes for the series: "We were only contractually obligated to order 13, and we ordered 16, because we think that's the way that show, at least in its first iteration, will be very strong to arc to. Could we do more next season? We certainly could, but that’s where we're starting with that one. That show is going to have a very strong, serialized element". Speaking of the project at the 2014 winter TCA press tour, Reilly described the series as "this operatic soap that has a slightly larger-than-life quality. This is not some adjunct companion series. This is the Batman franchise, just backing it up [in chronology]". He later added that the series is separate from any DC film universe.

=== Casting ===
In January 2014, rumors arose that Donal Logue would portray Gordon in the series, but Logue denied these rumors via Twitter. Logue was eventually cast as Harvey Bullock.

In February, Ben McKenzie was cast as James Gordon. In March, David Mazouz was cast as Bruce Wayne while Camren Bicondova was cast as Selina Kyle. Cory Michael Smith was cast as Edward Nygma, the early version of the villain The Riddler.

At the 2014 Chicago Comic & Entertainment Expo, DC's Jim Cunningham said that Renee Montoya would be a character on the show. The character eventually appeared in the series, portrayed by Victoria Cartagena.

== Reception ==
=== Ratings ===
The pilot was watched by 8.21 million viewers, with a 3.2 rating among 18-49 adults. The results were below expectations of becoming the greatest opener in 2015 but were still strong numbers. The pilot ranked as Monday night's No. 1 drama, beating NBC's The Blacklist and new CBS drama Scorpion after three days of delayed viewing.

With Live+7 DVR viewing factored in, the episode had an overall rating of 14.45 million viewers, and a 6.0 in the 18–49 demographic.

=== Critical reception ===
Professional ratings
Review scores
Source	Rating
Rotten Tomatoes	80%
The A.V. Club	C
Paste Magazine	7.0
TV Fanatic	3.5/5 stars
IGN	7.0
Den of Geek	3/5 stars
New York Magazine	2/5 stars

"Pilot" was well received by critics. The episode received a rating of 80% on the review aggregator Rotten Tomatoes based on 25 reviews, with the site's consensus stating: "Though overcrowded with introductions, the Gotham pilot sets the template for an engrossing crime drama with moody atmosphere and likable lead actors".

Matt Fowler of IGN gave the episode a "good" 7.0 out of 10 and wrote in his verdict, "Gotham, from Rome and The Mentalist's Bruno Heller, kicked things off with a basic, somewhat bland, crime story filled with a few too many dog ears. Though I also understand the show's need to sell as many Batman-y elements as it can right out of the gate, considering that it'll never have the big, main ingredient people want. The story-telling almost gets hampered by the brand itself. And the sheer amount of "they all knew each other at one point" coincidences might turn some folks off. Still, Gotham does work when it spins in the opposite direction and strays from what we've become too familiar with. Cobblepot is a delicious wild card, Fish Mooney is a fun addition, and Alfred is joyfully uncouth. David Mazouz's young Bruce is appropriately mature while Camren Bicondova's Selina Kyle hops around rooftops, spying on his trauma. On the flip side, I felt like an "everyman" approach to Gordon would have served that character better than the intensity seen here. The biggest challenge for Gotham just might be whether or not all these relationships, told in long form, will wind up being more effective—or at least as effective—as what other filmmakers were able to achieve with just a few flashbacks".

The A.V. Club's Oliver Sava gave the episode a "C" grade and wrote, "The chemistry between Bullock and Gordon finally clicks during their last scene together in the pilot, with Logue revealing Bullock’s vulnerability in hopes that Gordon will sacrifice his morals to save them both. This show’s fate ultimately rests in that core relationship between Gordon and Bullock, and the stronger their characters become, the better Gotham will fare".
