= The Balloonman =

- Gotham episode
- Episode no.: Season 1 Episode 3
- Directed by: Dermott Downs
- Written by: John Stephens
- Production code: 4X6653
- Original air date: October 6, 2014

Guest appearances
- David Zayas as Salvatore "Sal" Maroni; Dan Bakkedahl as Davis Lamond; Clark Middleton as Jimmy; James Colby as Lt. Bill Cranston; Jack Koenig as Ronald Danzer

Episode chronology
← Previous "Selina Kyle"	Next → "Arkham"

"The Balloonman" is the third episode of the television series Gotham. It premiered on FOX on October 6, 2014 and was written by John Stephens and directed by Dermott Downs. In the episode, detectives Gordon (Ben McKenzie) and Bullock (Donal Logue) track down a vigilante who is killing corrupt Gotham citizens by attaching them to weather balloons. Meanwhile, Oswald Cobblepot (Robin Lord Taylor) returns to Gotham and gets a new job close to an influential figure in the underworld.

The episode was watched by 6.36 million viewers but received mixed reviews, with criticism aimed at the pace.

== Plot ==
Cobblepot (Robin Lord Taylor) returns to Gotham City. A breaking news report on a nearby TV reports that a businessman Ronald Danzer (Jack Koenig), is out on bail awaiting trial for a Ponzi scheme bilked a half a billion dollars. He tries to escape when he is intercepted outside the building by a man with a pig mask. The man ties Danzer to a weather balloon and Danzer floats in the sky.

As Gordon (Ben McKenzie) and Bullock (Donal Logue) investigate the "Balloonman" case (where he kills corrupt citizens), Gordon works with Selina (Camren Bicondova) on the Wayne murder case. He takes her to the alley and explains what she saw but Gordon is not convinced that she was really there at the time of the incident. When she reveals she stole a man's wallet before going to the alley and recalling when the man reported it, she says the wallet fell in the sewer. Gordon handcuffs her and goes down the sewer to look for the wallet. He finds it but Selina frees herself and flees.

Fish Mooney (Jada Pinkett Smith) is questioned by Montoya (Victoria Cartagena) and Allen (Andrew Stewart-Jones) about Cobblepot's whereabouts. She suggests it was Gordon who killed him, which makes them realize it was Falcone (John Doman) who ordered the hit. While practicing fencing with Alfred (Sean Pertwee), Bruce (David Mazouz) decides to lead his own investigation of the murder of his parents.

Cobblepot gets a job at Bamonte's Restaurant as a dishwasher under the alias of Paolo, after having killed one of the employees. He is surprised when he sees Mob Boss Salvatore Maroni (David Zayas) using the restaurant as a base of operations for his businesses. Maroni notices him and befriends him as Maroni sees Cobblepot as a younger version of himself. Lt. Bill Cranston (James Colby) is the next victim of the Balloonman. Barbara (Erin Richards) is visited by Montoya, and it is revealed that the two of them were formerly lovers. Montoya tries to tell Barbara of Gordon's involvement in Cobblepot's disappearance but Barbara refuses to believe her.

Gordon and Bullock arrest Carl Smikers, the manufacturer of the balloons, and take him to the station for questioning. They realize Davis Lamond (Dan Bakkedahl) is the Balloonman and they get orders to arrest him. Arriving at a facility, Gordon and Bullock ambush him. However, Lamond holds Bullock at gunpoint, confessing to having become The Balloonman to stop put an end to the city's corruption. After a fight, during which Gordon and Lamond are carried into the air holding the weather balloon, Bullock shoots the balloon and both fall. Lamond is then arrested.

Bruce and Alfred watch the arrest of Lamond with Alfred praising The Balloonman's actions, but Bruce says that as he killed people, he's a criminal as well. In the Gordon's Penthouse, Barbara opens the door to reveal Cobblepot outside, asking for Gordon.

== Reception ==
=== Ratings ===
The pilot was watched by 6.36 million viewers, with a 2.5 rating among 18-49 adults. With Live+7 DVR viewing factored in, the episode had an overall rating of 10.88 million viewers, and a 4.5 in the 18–49 demographic.

=== Critical reception ===
Professional ratings
Review scores
Source	Rating
Rotten Tomatoes	60%
The A.V. Club	C−
Paste Magazine	5.0
TV Fanatic	3.7/5 stars
IGN	7.2
New York Magazine	3/5 stars

"The Balloonman" was generally well received by critics. The episode received a rating of 60% on the review aggregator Rotten Tomatoes based on 24 reviews, with the site's consensus stating: "The shakiest episode of Gotham so far, 'The Balloonman' is tonally inconsistent but benefits from a welcome dose of pitch-black humor."

Matt Fowler of IGN gave the episode a "good" 7.2 out of 10 and wrote in his verdict, "'The Balloonman' was okay, but the more and more Gotham is shown as a cesspool from every perceivable angle, the harder it is to care about anything or anyone. It might be why the villains already represent the most interesting parts of the show. All Gordon can do right now is intensely nag and then try to solve cases no one wants solved. And even though the show never skips a moment to foreshadow things to come (on a show that we'll never see), it's weird to think that by the time Batman hits the scene, he may not even seem like a big deal. The city's already escalating things and going nuts way ahead of schedule."

The A.V. Club's Oliver Sava gave the episode a "C−" grade and wrote, "Remember last week's cliffhanger with Selina Kyle telling Gordon that she knew who really killed the Waynes? Tonight's episode starts to follow-up on that dangling thread before literally taking a detour through shit, and then Selina disappears for the rest of the story. That's not necessarily a bad thing because Camren Bicondova isn't the strongest actor, but it's frustrating from a plot perspective. Gordon takes Selina back to Crime Alley, then immediately starts wondering why he should believe her instead of getting information he could use to track down the Waynes' killer. I'm no expert on police procedure, so maybe it's regular practice to make sure a witness was actually at the scene before getting information, but it all feels like a way to delay the resolution of last week's cliffhanger for a few more weeks. The Wayne murder investigation is the driving force of this show's narrative, but the baby steps taken in this episode make that essential aspect of the story feel like an afterthought."
