= Arkham (Gotham) =

- Gotham episode
- Episode no.: Season 1 Episode 4
- Directed by: TJ Scott
- Written by: Ken Woodruff
- Production code: 4X6654
- Original air date: October 13, 2014

Guest appearances
- David Zayas as Salvatore "Sal" Maroni; Richard Kind as Mayor Aubrey James; Drew Powell as Butch Gilzean; Hakeem Kae-Kazim as Richard Gladwell; Makenzie Leigh as Liza; Danny Mastrogiorgio as Frankie Carbone; Brad Calcaterra as Minks; Evander Duck as Councilman Ron Jenkins

Episode chronology
← Previous "The Balloonman"	Next → "Viper"

"Arkham" is the fourth episode of the television series Gotham. It premiered on FOX on October 13, 2014, and was written by Ken Woodruff and directed by TJ Scott. In the episode, detectives Gordon (Ben McKenzie) and Bullock (Donal Logue) try to save the council of Gotham, which is threatened after a dispute for the known Arkham Plan is in progress. Meanwhile, Cobblepot (Robin Lord Taylor) indulges more in Maroni's mafia.

The episode was watched by 6.39 million viewers, an improvement over the previous episode and received positive reviews. Critics praised Gordon's and Cobblepot's dynamics but criticized the poor choice of villain.

== Plot ==
Gordon (Ben McKenzie) berates Cobblepot (Robin Lord Taylor) after showing up at his apartment. Cobblepot tells him a mob war will happen with the Arkham Plan, which convinces Gordon. It's revealed that Falcone (John Doman) and Mayor James (Richard Kind) are backing the project.

A councilman, Ron Jenkins (Evander Duck) is killed by a hitman. Gordon tells Bullock (Donal Logue) and Essen (Zabryna Guevara) that the Arkham District is a battlefield between Falcone and Maroni. Upon visiting a prisoner who knows the hitman, Gordon and Bullock look for Richard Gladwell (Hakeem Kae-Kazim), a possible suspect. They find a paper that reads C.L.M.

Bamonte's is attacked by three masked men, which forces Cobblepot to protect the money until they flee. Cobblepot is promoted to restaurant manager by Maroni after the manager is killed in the attack. It was discovered by Bullock that the real Gladwell was dead for five years and that the hitman was using his name. Gordon figures out that Mayor James will be the next target, due to the C.L.M. referring to the initials of the officers sent to protect the mayor. While protecting James, Gordon fights the hitman until Bullock arrives to back him up. The hitman is killed by Bullock and Gordon.

Meanwhile, Mooney (Jada Pinkett Smith) pairs up two possible women for her nightclub job opening against each other where a woman named Liza (Makenzie Leigh) wins. Mayor James holds a press conference about the Arkham Plan. Cobblepot reunites with the masked men who attacked Bamonte's, turning out he hired them so he could get the promotion. They then die after Cobblepot serves them poisoned cannoli.

== Reception ==
=== Ratings ===
The episode was watched by 6.39 million viewers, with a 2.4 rating among 18-49 adults. With Live+7 DVR viewing factored in, the episode had an overall rating of 10.34 million viewers, and a 4.1 in the 18–49 demographic.

=== Critical reviews ===
Professional ratings
Review scores
Source	Rating
Rotten Tomatoes	75%
The A.V. Club	C
Paste Magazine	7.0
TV Fanatic	4.0/5 stars
IGN	7.7
New York Magazine	2/5 stars

"Arkham" was well received by critics. The episode received a rating of 75% on the review aggregator Rotten Tomatoes based on 24 reviews, with the site's consensus stating: "A decent but forgettable episode of Gotham, 'Arkham' shines when the focus shifts to Jim Gordon and Oswald 'Penguin' Cobblepot."

Matt Fowler of IGN gave the episode a "good" 7.7 out of 10 and wrote in his verdict, "Gotham was blissfully foreshadow-free this week, and having Arkham be the actual item that our big villains were fighting over was an inspired way to bring that location into the show. Plus, Fish Mooney and Cobblepot continue to delight as they both separately schemed to take over city. I felt like they could have done more with the hitman this week, "Gladwell," since he kept bringing up his own past and it was never fleshed out. And the idea that Falcone and Maroni wouldn't somehow know (or care) that they were paying the same guy to take shots at the other side didn't feel right. Why wouldn't one just pay Gladwell to kill three councilmen on the other side? Or kill the actual other boss? So I'm hoping, even though the guy got shot down, that we learn more about this."

The A.V. Club's Oliver Sava gave the episode a "C" grade and wrote, "Gotham is a show that runs on abstract nouns. The dialogue is overblown in hopes that it will add gravitas to the story, but it ultimately strips the show of its humanity. These abstract concepts are what drive the plot (we can throw "war" in there as Oswald's big abstract noun), and that makes it extremely hard to connect to the characters on a personal level. While tonight's episode is an improvement over the last couple of chapters, 'Arkham' is still wildly uneven, frustrating, and shallow. Escalating the Gotham mob war gives this episode a stronger sense of forward momentum, but there are still plenty of developments that prevent this show from rising above mediocrity."
