= Fish Mooney =

- Gotham character
- Jada Pinkett Smith as Fish Mooney
- First appearance: "Pilot"; September 22, 2014
- Last appearance: "Destiny Calling"; June 5, 2017
- Created by: Bruno Heller
- Portrayed by: Jada Pinkett Smith

In-universe information
- Full name: Maria Mercedes Mooney
- Nickname: Fish
- Gender: Female
- Nationality: American

Maria Mercedes "Fish" Mooney is a fictional character created by producer and screenwriter Bruno Heller for the television series Gotham, portrayed by actress Jada Pinkett Smith.

== Development ==
Pinkett-Smith drew inspiration from various different individuals for taking on the role, including the fictional character of Norma Desmond from the 1950 film Sunset Boulevard, played by Gloria Swanson; and Griselda Blanco, a real-life drug lord of the Medellín Cartel.

== Fictional character biography ==
=== Season 1 ===
Fish Mooney is mob boss Carmine Falcone's most trusted lieutenant. Unbeknownst to Falcone, Fish is plotting to usurp his criminal empire, and employs a young woman named Liza, who resembles Falcone's late mother, to distract the lonely, aging mafia chieftain while Fish undermines his control of Gotham City. She has good relations with the Gotham City Police Department, and decides to help detective Harvey Bullock in investigating the murder of Thomas and Martha Wayne in return for him leaving her alone. When her underling Oswald Cobblepot informs on her to the GCPD, she hobbles him — giving him his trademark "penguin walk" — and orders him killed along with Bullock and his new partner, Jim Gordon. Falcone intervenes, however, and spares their lives. Cobblepot gradually works his way up the ladder of Gotham's underworld to become the right-hand man of both Falcone and his rival, mob boss, Sal Maroni, and gets revenge on Fish by revealing her treachery to Falcone. Hurt and angered by Fish's betrayal, Falcone has her and Butch tortured, however Butch escapes custody and frees Fish. Wanting revenge against Penguin, she goes to her former club to find him there and proceeds to beat him. Before she can do much harm she and Butch are pursued by Zsasz and his crew. Butch helps her escape while staying behind to fend them off to buy her time. Harvey meets up with her later that night and helps her flee from Gotham City.

However, she is captured again by unknown peoples and wakes to find herself held prisoner in a large basement area with other random abductees, many of whom have been there for years. She learns that they are kept as "spare parts" by the man who owns the large estate and his security staff, with different prisoners being selected by the guards every few days, taken away, and returning (if at all) with missing body parts. Fish takes control of the basement and organizes a resistance by promising she'll be able to save "some" of them (but not all). She forces a meeting with the man in charge, Francis Dulmacher, a mad scientist who is running a blackmarket organ transplant farm and recreationally creating human monsters out of his victims' body parts. When Dulmacher tells her he is going to remove her eyes, she gouges out her own eye with a spoon so he can't use it in his experiments or sell it. Impressed by her resolve he offers a chance to prove her value as a go-between for himself and the prisoners in the basement, promising her safety as long as the supply of body parts isn't interrupted again. She uses this position to prepare an escape and, by sacrificing some of the detainees who had previously been bullying and abusing the weaker prisoners, she uses the ensuing chaos to escape with the rest and return to Gotham with a small band of devoted followers.

In the last episode of the first season, "All Happy Families Are Alike", Fish recruits the young Selina Kyle into her gang, and makes an alliance with Maroni in order to get rid of Falcone. Fish captures Falcone, Cobblepot, Gordon and Bullock. Fish reveals Cobblepot's treachery to Maroni in exchange for an agreement to divide the city between them. When Maroni reveals that he intends to rule the city with Fish as his lieutenant and treats her with sexist condescension, Fish loses her temper and shoots him in the head. An all-out gang war ensues between Fish and Maroni's forces, during which Cobblepot fights her on a rooftop and pushes her into the river below.

=== Season 2 ===
During the second season Fish's corpse is revealed to have been sent to Indian Hill, a scientific division of Wayne Enterprises run by Hugo Strange, who brings her back to life augmented with cuttlefish DNA. The side-effects of the revival gives Fish the ability to take control of anyone who comes in contact with her. She escapes and runs across Cobblepot, who since her death has taken over Gotham's criminal underworld as "The Penguin". Shocked, he passes out.

=== Season 3 ===
Soon after her rebirth, Fish starts going into rapid physical decline, and raids every pharmacy in Gotham for drugs to keep herself alive. She forms a new gang with her fellow Indian Hill escapees. She interrogates Strange's assistant Ethel Peabody, who tells her that her body is rejecting the cells Strange implanted in her, and that only Strange can save her. Fish has her fellow escapee Marv, who can accelerate or slow a person's metabolism, deplete the energy from Peabody's cells, literally stealing her life.

Fish frees Strange, intent on making him create more mutants to do her bidding. By then, however, Cobblepot has amassed an angry mob of Gothamites bent on killing the mutants. When Cobblepot has her at his mercy, Fish says she is proud of having transformed him into "The Penguin". Moved, Cobblepot tells her to leave Gotham and never come back. Later, when Gotham is in chaos from the effects of a homicidal mania-inducing virus, Fish joins forces with Cobblepot and Strange to create an antidote and hold the city to ransom. An infected Gordon shows up and attacks Mooney, accidentally impaling her with a sword and destroying the antidote. With her dying breath, Fish tells Cobblepot to either take Gotham for his own or burn it to the ground.

== Powers and abilities ==
After her resurrection by Hugo Strange near the end of the second season of Gotham, Mooney develops the ability to control people with just a touch of her hand.
