= Gillian B. Loeb =

Fictional character throughout the DC Universe

- Gillian B. Loeb as seen in Batman #405 (March 1987). Art by David Mazzucchelli.

Publication information
- Publisher: DC Comics
- First appearance: Batman #404 (February 1987)
- Created by: Frank Miller (writer); David Mazzucchelli (artist)

In-story information
- Species: Human
- Team affiliations: Gotham City Police Department

Gillian B. Loeb is a fictional character in the DC Universe who serves as an enemy to Batman's ally James "Jim" Gordon in DC Comics publications.

The character was portrayed by Colin McFarlane in The Dark Knight trilogy and Peter Scolari in the television series Gotham.

== Publication history ==
Loeb first appeared in Batman #404, as part of the Batman: Year One story arc. He along with his successor Jack Grogan, are predecessors and foils of James Gordon.

== Fictional character biography ==
=== Post-Crisis ===
Loeb is introduced in Batman: Year One as the commissioner of Gotham City's Police Department three months before Batman first appears in the city. He is in mob boss Carmine Falcone's pocket and considers then-Lieutenant James Gordon's honesty a threat. He has a habit of immediately following up his statements with childish re-assertions (e.g. "Dent is your problem, Falcone. Yes he is."), as if he anticipates being contradicted. Loeb does not share Gordon's concerns about Batman, since Batman is targeting only low-level criminals and distracts the public from his activities. Assistant district attorney Harvey Dent seems much more of a threat, as he has nearly indicted Falcone multiple times over the years. One night however, Batman breaks into Falcone's mansion during a dinner party, the guests at which include Loeb and several other Gotham elites, and announces that he intends to bring them down.

Terrified, Loeb assigns Gordon to lead a task force to arrest Batman. Gordon's traps for Batman prove utterly ineffective, but the GCPD corners him in an abandoned building following an impromptu rescue on the street. Loeb has a bomb dropped on the building and sends in a heavily armed SWAT team to search for a body. Batman escapes.

Loeb informs Gordon he has evidence of his extramarital affair with Sgt. Sarah Essen. However, Loeb seemingly keeps it a secret.

Eventually Detective Flass, faced with the prospect of ten years in prison, exposes Loeb's ties to the Falcone mob and he is forced to resign. According to Gordon, Loeb's replacement, Jack Grogan, is just as corrupt. Gordon becomes the department's commissioner a few years later.

In Batman: Dark Victory, Loeb returns, hoping to use the Hangman killings as an excuse to try to get the city council to remove Gordon from his position as commissioner. His overall goal is to regain his former position, arguing that his "experience" makes him more qualified. Before his plans can be fulfilled, he is killed by the Hangman Killer.

=== The New 52 ===
In The New 52 continuity reboot, Loeb is once again the corrupt commissioner of the GCPD. He assigns Gordon to partner with a crooked detective, Henshaw, who means to give Gordon to Black Mask's henchmen. Batman saves Gordon. Many of the corrupt police officers under Loeb's command known to be associated with the False Face gang are killed, leading Batman and Gordon to theorize that Loeb has suffered an emotional collapse.

During the Zero Year storyline, Riddler attacks GCPD blimps while taking over Gotham City's power grid and allowing the city to be flooded by a hurricane, Loeb is among those killed. After the crisis is resolved and the Riddler is captured, Gordon is appointed the department's new commissioner.

== In other media ==
=== Television ===
Gillian B. Loeb appears in Gotham, portrayed by Peter Scolari. This version is secretly and initially allied with Carmine Falcone before defecting to Sal Maroni. Additionally, Loeb had a mentally-ill daughter named Miriam, who killed her mother in a fit of jealousy twenty years prior. Following a failed attempt at forcing Jim Gordon to resign from the Gotham City Police Department, Loeb resigns and is succeeded by Sarah Essen.

=== Film ===
- Gillian B. Loeb appears in Darren Aronofsky's script for a planned Batman: Year One film, in which he was the master of organized crime in addition to being commissioner of the Gotham City Police Department.
- Gillian B. Loeb appears in Batman Begins, portrayed by Colin McFarlane. This version is an honest but self serving African-American policeman and commissioner who initially disapproves of vigilantism in Gotham City before changing his mind after Batman saves Gotham from Ra's al Ghul.
- Gillian B. Loeb appears in The Dark Knight, portrayed again by Colin McFarlane. Amidst the Joker's attack on Gotham, Loeb is assassinated by him by drinking poisoned whiskey. He is later succeeded by Lieutenant James Gordon.
- Gillian B. Loeb appears in Batman: Year One (2011), voiced by Jon Polito.

=== Video games ===
- Gillian B. Loeb appears in Batman: Arkham Origins, voiced by JB Blanc. This version is allied with Black Mask and personally assigned Detective Harvey Bullock to serve as Captain James Gordon's partner. After disguising himself as Black Mask, the Joker mounts a mass breakout at Blackgate Penitentiary, during which he takes Loeb hostage and kills him via a gas chamber. Having failed to save him, Batman suffers hallucinations of Loeb while thwarting the Joker's plans.
- Gillian B. Loeb, based on his appearance in The Dark Knight trilogy, appears in Lego Batman: Legacy of the Dark Knight.

=== Miscellaneous ===
Gillian B. Loeb, renamed Perry Loeb, appears in The Dark Knight's tie-in novelization.

== See also ==
- List of Batman family enemies
