= Dashiell Eaves =

American actor

- Born: August 6, 1974 (age 52); Albuquerque, New Mexico, U.S.
- Spouse: Kimmarie Lynch (m. 2005)

Dashiell Eaves is an American actor. He lives in New York City.

== Theater ==
Eaves began his professional career in 1993, at age nineteen, when he joined the original American cast of the Off-Broadway percussion show Stomp. Three years later he left that show after being cast as the Courier in Roundabout Theatre Company's revival of 1776. Since then he has appeared in other Broadway productions, The Sound of Music (Rolf), James Joyce's The Dead (Michael), The Lieutenant of Inishmore (Joey), Martin McDonagh's A Behanding in Spokane, the 2007 production of Helen Edmundson's Coram Boy at the Imperial Theatre (Thomas Ledbury), A Time to Kill, A Christmas Carol directed by Matthew Warchus (Bob Cratchit), and Sing Street, a rock musical based on the Irish film by the same name.

Eaves has appeared Off-Broadway in Lynn Nottage's Fabulation at Signature Theater, Luck of the Irish at LCT3 (Lincoln Center), The Lieutenant of Inishmore at Atlantic Theater Company, Frank McGuinness' Observe the Sons of Ulster Marching Towards the Somme at Lincoln Center, James Joyce's The Dead and Quincy Long's People Be Heard at Playwrights Horizons, and Dead Outlaw.

Regionally, Eaves' credits include The Wild Duck and Judgement Day at Bard Summerscape and Brendan at the Huntington Theater. He has appeared at the Williamstown Theatre Festival in A Midsummer Night's Dream (Lysander), Elmer Rice's Street Scene, and Ellen Melaver's Not Waving. He was part of Martha Clarke's production of Hans Christian Andersen at A.C.T. in San Francisco. He was also in the first developmental production of The 25th Annual Putnam County Spelling Bee at Barrington Stage Company, playing the role of Mitch the "Comfort Counselor".

== Film and television ==
Eaves' screen credits include Mindhunter, Law & Order: SVU, Gotham, The Good Wife, Blue Bloods episode "Baggage", and Law & Order: Criminal Intent episode "Masquerade" with Bill Irwin and Liza Minnelli. Other TV and film work includes Luc Besson's Arthur and the Invisibles III, Jonathan Demme's Beloved, the HBO film Stomp Out Loud, and Third Watch.
