= Dollmaker (character) =

Publication information
- Publisher: DC Comics
- First appearance: (Marcel Mannequin); Plastic Man (vol. 2) #10 (June 1968) (Anton Schott); Supergirl (vol. 5) #58 (January 2011) (Barton Mathis); Detective Comics (vol. 2) #1 (September 2011) (Matilda Mathis); Detective Comics (vol. 2) #2 (October 2011)
- Created by: (Marcel Mannequin); Arnold Drake (writer); Jack Sparling (artist) (Anton Schott) (writer); Sterling Gates (artist); Jamal Igle (Barton Mathis); Tony S. Daniel (Matilda Mathis); Tony S. Daniel

In-story information
- Alter ego: Marcel Mannequin; Anton Schott; Barton Mathis; Matilda Mathis
- Species: Human
- Place of origin: Earth
- Team affiliations: (Barton Mathis); Secret Society of Super Villains; The Dollmaker family (Matilda Mathis); The Dollmaker family
- Notable aliases: (Marcel Mannequin); The Doll Maker; The Doll Master
- Abilities: (Marcel & Anton): Mechanical inventors; (Barton Mathis): Gifted surgeon; (Matilda Mathis): Peak human agility; Surgical skills

The Dollmaker is the name of several supervillains appearing in American comic books published by DC Comics.

Barton Mathis appeared in Arrow, portrayed by Michael Eklund. Additionally, a character based on Dollmaker named Dr. Francis Dulmacher appears in Gotham, portrayed by Colm Feore.

== Publication history ==
The Marcel Mannequin version of the Dollmaker first appeared in Plastic Man (vol. 2) #10, and was created by Arnold Drake and Jack Sparling.

The Anton Schott version of the Dollmaker first appeared in Supergirl (vol. 5) #58, and was created by Sterling Gates and Jamal Igle.

The Barton Mathis version of the Dollmaker first appeared in Detective Comics (vol. 2) #1, and was created by Tony S. Daniel.

== Fictional character biography ==
Marcel Mannequin / Dollmaker as he appears in the pages of Plastic Man (vol. 2) #10.

=== Marcel Mannequin ===
The first Dollmaker is Marcel Mannequin, a talented dollmaker who uses sentient mechanical dolls to commit crimes. Plastic Man manages to defeat the Dollmaker at Madame DeLute's high society party.

=== Anton Schott ===
Anton Schott as Dollmaker.

Anton Schott is the son of Winslow Schott, a.k.a. Toyman. His father saw little interest in his son, whom he considered uninteresting, despite Anton showing great promise as a toymaker. Anton's mother took him away on the belief that Winslow was a pedophile but only to abandon him, leaving him to fend for himself in Metropolis. Anton soon found his father's old workshop and decided to make a name for himself as the Dollmaker. Driven by abandonment issues, Anton started kidnapping other children and turning them into cybernetic doll-like slaves.

Anton becomes obsessed with Daily Planet reporter Cat Grant, whose son was killed by Toyman, and plans on becoming her unofficial son. Grant violently rejects Anton, causing him to decide on shutting down all his enslaved doll-children, which would kill them. Grant calls out for Supergirl, who raids Dollmaker's workshop and disarms the dolls. Grant personally knock out Dollmaker and leaves him to be arrested.

=== Barton Mathis ===
Barton Mathis as Dollmaker.

In September 2011, The New 52 rebooted DC's continuity. In this new timeline, Barton Mathis is introduced as a new "Dollmaker". As a child, Mathis went on several "hunting trips" with his father, Wesley. During these hunts, Mathis watched as his father killed people and then cannibalized them. He would also witness his father being shot down by cop James Gordon. After spending only a year in foster care, Mathis disappeared for years before resurfacing as Dollmaker, a serial killer who creates "dolls" out of the skin and limbs of his victims, whose mask is partially made of skin from his deceased father. Despite the ambiguity surrounding his whereabouts, it would later be revealed that Barton Mathis sees Toyman as a father figure, who was at one point a member of the Dollmaker "family".

As Batman tries to rescue Commissioner Gordon from Dollmaker, he discovers that Gordon is a "doll" of human body parts stitched together to resemble Gordon. Dollmaker announces his plans to make a doll of Batman's flesh and then sell it off to the highest bidder. Batman resists and is forced to fight all of Dollmaker's family while dealing with rapidly spreading paralysis. Struggling to stand, Batman escapes while dragging Jack-in-the-Box with him. At an abandoned hospital, a kidnapped Gordon overhears Dollmaker explaining that he plans to remove his liver before beginning the doll process, because he must save a life before his can be taken. He expresses an interest in filming the procedure, as he has a personal vendetta against Gordon for killing his father. When Batman arrives at the hospital, he is attacked by Bentley, who chokes Batman into unconsciousness.

Suspended like a marionette, Batman is forced to fight the Joker dolls when a crook named Raju arrives at Dollmaker's lair to offer Dollmaker a large sum of money in exchange for Batman. Raju's client is the Penguin, who plans to pay Dollmaker some gold bars in exchange for Batman's body. Dollmaker uses magnetized cables to immobilize Batman completely, and Batman is surprised to realize that the cables are of his own design, as Dollmaker has gained access to Wayne Corp. Regardless, he uses a demagnetizer in his suit to free himself, leaping forward and knocking the Penguin's thugs out. Freed, he easily defeats the Joker dolls and begins his search for Gordon. Meanwhile, Dollmaker receives a call from an unseen benefactor, who warns him that the GCPD are on their way. The benefactor orders that Gordon be killed. Batman rescues Gordon as Dollmaker and Matilda escape.

During the Death of the Family storyline as Batman travels through the Joker-controlled Arkham Asylum, he discovers a twisted "royal tapestry" created for him as a "tribute from [his] faithful", made entirely of living bodies sewn together, kept alive via tubes in their stomachs. The Joker tells Batman that it was made "with a little help from Dollmaker". Dollmaker is later found by the Joker's Daughter, who asks him to sew the Joker's face onto her own and inject the Joker's blood into her veins. Dollmaker follows through with her request. During the "Forever Evil" storyline, Dollmaker is among the supervillains who are recruited into the Secret Society of Super Villains.

=== Dollhouse ===
Dollhouse as she appears in the panel of a comic book.

According to Matilda Mathis, she comes from a bloodline of supervillains, with Matilda serving as a successor to Dollmaker and Toyman. Prior to taking up the name "Dollhouse", Matilda had a doll mask grafted on top of her face and wore a nurse's outfit, killing victims with a sledgehammer. Eventually, Matilda began to join her father in organ trading. Following the events of the "Faces of Death" storyline, Matilda was forced to retreat and go into hiding with her father.

Some time after Batman's defeat of the Dollmaker family, Matilda Mathis began to follow in the footsteps as her father, Barton Mathis, taking on the identity of "Dollhouse". As Dollhouse, Matilda adopted Barton Mathis' modus operandi as Dollmaker. Dollhouse kidnapped homeless children, prostitutes and junkies of the streets of Gotham City and took them back to her facility. At her facility, Dollhouse would spend weeks nursing victims to peak condition before killing them and selling their organs. Dollhouse would then stuff the remainder of the corpses and turn them into human dolls, putting them on display in her garden.

== Skills and abilities ==
The first Dollmaker uses mechanical dolls that he can control.

The second Dollmaker is a talented inventor who can use sentient dolls as mobile weapons.

The third Dollmaker is a gifted surgeon known for creating dolls made of human flesh. He has enough skill to make them almost perfectly resemble specific living beings. Barton has some access to Wayne Enterprises technology and resources, as shown when he went against Batman.

In the Faces of Death story arc, Matilda is shown to be quite agile and in possession of a sledgehammer that she wields against her opponents. As Dollhouse, she uses heavy artillery and military grade weapons, such as grenades or machine guns. She is also a skilled surgeon.

== In other media ==
=== Television ===
Dr. Francis Dulmacher as he appears in Gotham.

- An unrelated Dollmaker appears in the Super Friends: The Legendary Super Powers Show episode "The Case of the Dreadful Dolls", voiced by Frank Welker. This version uses voodoo dolls and hides out in Schott's Toy Factory. DVD commentary reveals that the show's producers created this incarnation of Dollmaker in lieu of the Toyman, who was not available to them.
- Barton Mathis appears in the Arrow episode "Broken Dolls", portrayed by Michael Eklund. This version is a serial killer who murders young girls by pouring polymer into their throats before dressing and posing their bodies like bisque dolls, which earned him the nickname "Dollmaker" from the police. Six years prior, he was apprehended by Quentin Lance before breaking out of Iron Heights Penitentiary amidst Malcolm Merlyn's Undertaking during the first season finale with Count Vertigo's help. Determined to recapture him, Quentin joins forces with Arrow. However, Quentin and Laurel Lance are kidnapped by Mathis, who intends to kill the latter in front of Quentin until Canary kills Mathis for threatening her family.
- A character based on Barton Mathis / Dollmaker named Francis Dulmacher appears in the first season of Gotham, portrayed by Colm Feore. This version is a "mad European scientist" who found ways to revive the dead and trafficks organs and children.

=== Film ===
Dollmaker as he appears in Batman vs. Robin.

An amalgamated incarnation of Dollmaker appears in Batman vs. Robin, voiced by "Weird Al" Yankovic. This version is identified as Anton Schott, has elements of Barton Mathis, and wears a broken doll mask. Additionally, he was almost killed by his serial killer father as a child and is based in an abandoned toy factory in Gotham, where he kidnaps children and turns them into cyborgs so that they, according to him, can never be hurt again. Following a fight with Robin, who reluctantly spares him, Dollmaker is killed by the Court of Owls.

=== Video games ===
- The Barton Mathis incarnation of Dollmaker appears in Batman: Caped Crusader - Chronicles (2026).

== See also ==
- List of Batman family enemies
