= Wayne Enterprises =

Fictional company owned by Batman, appearing in DC Comics

- Wayne Enterprise Logo

Publication information
- Publisher: DC Comics
- First appearance: Batman #307 (January 1979)
- Created by: Bob Haney (writer); Jim Aparo (artist)

In-story information
- Type of business: Conglomerate
- Base(s): Gotham City
- Owner(s): Thomas Wayne; Bruce Wayne; Joker
- Employee(s): Lucius Fox

Wayne Enterprises, also known as WayneCorp, Wayne Industries, Wayne Foundation and WayneTech, is a fictional company appearing in American comic books published by DC Comics, commonly in association with the superhero Batman. Wayne Enterprises is a large, growing multinational company.

The American diversified multinational conglomerate is owned and chaired by Bruce Wayne, the son of Thomas Wayne and Martha Kane. Wayne Enterprises is headquartered in Wayne Tower, Gotham City.

Wayne Enterprises and the Wayne Foundation are largely run by Bruce's business manager, Lucius Fox. Fox makes most company decisions on Bruce's behalf, since Bruce's time is largely occupied by his duties as the vigilante, Batman.

In the 2020 storyline The Joker War, the Joker seizes control of Wayne Enterprises and steals the whole of the Wayne fortune, which he then uses to wreak havoc in Gotham. Bruce Wayne eventually regains control of Wayne Enterprises and has the Joker removed from the company for good.

== Company history ==
Wayne Tower in Batman: Legends of the Dark Knight#27 (February 1992). Art by Chris Sprouse.

Founded by merchant ancestors of the Wayne family in the 17th century as a merchant house. The company began as a dozen businesses started by the Wayne brothers, Judge Solomon Wayne and Joshua Wayne, and with the revenue generated by the company, Solomon essentially built Gotham City by hiring Cyrus Pinkney.

Solomon's son and heir, Alan Wayne officially made it a corporate company in the 19th century. Alan, who was Bruce Wayne's great-great-grandfather, erected Wayne Shipping, Wayne Chemical and Wayne Manufacturing. All these companies were energized by the Industrial Revolution; more branches were created and diversified while others dwindled and subsequently dissolved. Along the years, it has developed from a merchant house to a large multinational conglomerate company.

Under the control of Patrick and Laura Wayne, Wayne Enterprises became a "green company" and environmentally conscious from that time forward.

Following the end of "The Joker War" storyline, Lucius Fox regains control of the Wayne fortune from the Joker. He warns Bruce that even if he did return his wealth to him, he would no longer be able to use the companies to fund his heroics, as the board of directors would be monitoring his money. This reduced Bruce's personal wealth status from a billionaire to a millionaire. Some time later, Bruce regains control of his fortune and returns as the CEO of Wayne Enterprises, replacing Lucius.

=== Wayne Tower ===
Wayne Tower is the headquarters of Wayne Enterprises. Also called "Old Wayne Tower" and "Wayne Industries Headquarters"; it was built in 1888 by Alan Wayne. Built as a symbol to welcome all of those who enter the city, Wayne Tower has 13 gargoyles, one for each of the 13 entry points into the city. At the top of the tower is an observation deck which Alan Wayne asserted be open to the public for free on weekends. The windows are made of glass that was designed to be weatherproof and unbreakable.

== Wayne Foundation ==
The Wayne Foundation Building as it appears in Who's Who: The Definitive Directory of the DC Universe#25 (March 1987). Art by Terry Austin.

The Wayne Foundation is the holding company for the Thomas Wayne Foundation and the Martha Wayne Foundation. The primary aims of the foundation are, globally, the arts and humanities: to enhance healthcare and reduce poverty, to expand educational opportunities and access to information technology, and to fund scientific research and help altruistic people with research by providing facilities and training.

The foundation has its own building, called the Wayne Foundation Building, which includes a penthouse where Bruce Wayne lived for a period of time. It also has a secret elevator that leads to a matching Batcave in a secret sub-basement under the building.

Through the Wayne Foundation and the affiliated organizations underneath, Bruce Wayne addresses social-economic problems encouraging crime, assists victims of crimes, and maintains connections to the streets through the soup kitchens and social services groups; all of which augments his crime fighting efforts in a way that his Batman persona cannot. This arrangement also provides a large network of connections.

=== Thomas Wayne Foundation ===
The Thomas Wayne Foundation is a foundation for medicine and medical help. This foundation gives annual awards for medical breakthroughs and lifelong commitment, similar to the Nobel Foundation. The Thomas Wayne Foundation is also responsible for funding the Thomas Wayne Memorial Clinic, which funds dozens of clinics in Gotham. Leslie Thompkins runs the Memorial Clinic in Crime Alley and governed the other clinics until she left Gotham.

=== Martha Wayne Foundation ===
The Martha Wayne Foundation is a patron and supporter of arts, families, education, and tolerance. The foundation supports and helps to run a number of orphanages and free schools, and provides teachers for those who have learning difficulties. Artists can apply for grants from the foundation to help support them in furthering the arts. The foundation sponsors companies like Family Finders. Family Finders is an organization directed at finding lost people and uniting families. The Martha Wayne Foundation also sponsors and runs soup kitchens within the city.

=== Bat Bunker ===
Under the Wayne Foundation building, there is a secret bunker. Dick Grayson used the bunker as his "Batcave," stating that he wishes to embody the role of Batman in a way that is specific to him as well as getting closer to the action in the city. The bunker is as well-equipped as the original Batcave, including the Subway Rocket vehicle stationed beneath the bunker.

== In other media ==
=== Television ===
- Wayne Enterprises appears in series set in the DC Animated Universe (DCAU). In Batman Beyond, Wayne Enterprises is bought by Powers Technologies' owner Derek Powers and renamed Wayne-Powers. In Batman Beyond: Return of the Joker, Bruce Wayne reclaims control of Wayne-Powers and returns it to its original name of Wayne Enterprises.
- Wayne Enterprises appears in The Batman (2004).
- Wayne Enterprises appears in the Arrowverse series, Arrow and Batwoman.
- Wayne Enterprises appears in Young Justice.
- Wayne Enterprises appears in Beware the Batman.
- Wayne Enterprises appears in Gotham.
- Wayne Enterprises appears in Powerless.

=== Film ===
- Wayne Enterprises appears in Batman (1966).
- Wayne Enterprises appears in Batman Forever and Batman & Robin.
- Wayne Enterprises appears in The Dark Knight Trilogy.
- Wayne Enterprises appears in media set in the DC Extended Universe.
- Wayne Enterprises appears in Joker (2019).
- Wayne Enterprises appears in The Batman (2022).

=== Video games ===
- Wayne Enterprises appears in DC Universe Online.
- Wayne Enterprises appears in the Batman: Arkham series.
- Wayne Enterprises appears in Lego Batman: The Videogame and Lego Batman 2: DC Super Heroes.
