= Leslie Thompkins =

Fictional character in the DC comics universe; surrogate figure to Bruce Wayne

- Leslie Thompkins as seen in Detective Comics #457 (March 1976). Art by Dick Giordano

Publication information
- Publisher: DC Comics
- First appearance: Detective Comics #457 (March 1976)
- Created by: Dennis O'Neil (writer); Dick Giordano (artist)

In-story information
- Full name: Leslie Maurin Thompkins
- Supporting character of: Batman; Robin; Nightwing; Catwoman; Stephanie Brown

Dr. Leslie Maurin Thompkins (sometimes spelled Tompkins) is a fictional character appearing in comic books published by DC Comics, usually as a supporting character in stories featuring Batman, of whom she is a close family friend. Created by writer Dennis O'Neil and artist Dick Giordano, she first appeared in Detective Comics #457 (March 1976).

Her live-action debut was in 2015 on Fox's television series Gotham, where she was portrayed by Morena Baccarin. On the HBO Max series Titans, she was portrayed by Krista Bridges in the third season.

== Publication history ==
Created by writer Dennis O'Neil and artist Dick Giordano, she first appeared in Detective Comics #457 (March 1976). She was based on the Catholic pacifist Dorothy Day.

A close friend and medical colleague of Thomas Wayne, Leslie serves as a surrogate parent to his son Bruce after his parents are murdered, and later becomes a confidant in his crusade as Batman. In addition to being one of Batman's allies, Leslie is also a renowned medical professional who has dedicated her considerable skills toward helping Gotham City's less fortunate.

== Fictional character biography ==
Leslie Thompkins makes her first appearance in Detective Comics #457, in which she is depicted as comforting the young Bruce Wayne on the night that his parents are murdered. Inspired, she dedicates her life to helping slum kids avoid a life of crime. Every year, on the anniversary of his parents' murder, Batman visits Leslie in Park Row (which is now referred to as Crime Alley). However, Leslie has no idea he is the boy she helped decades before.

In later years, Leslie is portrayed as having been a close friend and colleague of Thomas Wayne, Bruce's father. She takes it upon herself to look after Bruce after the boy's parents are murdered, often acting with the family butler Alfred Pennyworth as a parental figure and guardian. After Wrath dies in combat with Batman, Leslie comforts Wrath's grieving girlfriend much as she had young Bruce. She also eventually learns that Bruce is Batman.

She runs a clinic for criminals and drug addicts in Gotham City. While the majority of her patients are repeat offenders, she continues to do her job with great perseverance and determination. During the No Man's Land storyline, she runs Gotham's only medical clinic, operating under a strict 'No Violence' policy regardless of her patients' actions and intent.

Stephanie Brown suffers serious injuries at the hands of Black Mask during the storyline War Games and is taken to Leslie's clinic for treatment, where she apparently dies from her injuries. Batman discovers that Leslie deliberately treated Stephanie improperly, intending to show to Batman that his constant use of children as sidekicks was endangering them. She eventually flees Gotham and travels to Africa where she starts a new clinic. Batman travels there and confronts her, saying he'll bring her to justice if she ever returns, effectively exiling her. It is later revealed that Leslie faked Stephanie's death using an overdose victim who had a similar appearance.

After the events of Batman: Battle for the Cowl, Leslie Thompkins has once again set up shop in Gotham, attempting to start over. Cavalier, an enemy of Batman, briefly works as her bodyguard. Leslie has been welcomed back warmly by Alfred and Dick Grayson. Tim Drake, however, maintains a frosty attitude towards her due to her actions regarding Stephanie.

=== The New 52 ===
In 2011, The New 52 rebooted the DC universe. Leslie Thompkins appears, younger than she is usually depicted, in Red Hood and the Outlaws. She is featured in Jason Todd's flashbacks as Red Hood: she took him in at her clinic in Gotham City after he was injured due to fall, while he attempted a robbery.

== In other media ==
=== Television ===
- Leslie Thompkins appears in the DC Animated Universe series Batman: The Animated Series and The New Batman Adventures, voiced by Diana Muldaur. This version is a lifelong friend of Bruce Wayne who attended medical school with his father Thomas. She knows Batman's secret identity and serves as his doctor, confidentially treating injuries that he could not be publicly known to have without raising suspicion.
- Leslie Thompkins appears in the Batman: Caped Crusader episode "Nocturne", voiced by Donna Lynne Champlin. This version is the head of an orphanage.

==== Live action ====
- Leslie "Lee" Thompkins appears in Gotham, portrayed by Morena Baccarin. This version is a physician who has an on-off relationship with Jim Gordon and has no overt connection to Thomas Wayne. She later briefly serves as the leader of the Narrows alongside Edward Nygma before marrying Gordon and becoming stepmother to his daughter Barbara by the end of the series.
- Leslie Thompkins appears in the Titans episode "Lazarus", portrayed by Krista Bridges. This version is a therapist and former colleague of Jonathan Crane.

=== Film ===
Sister Leslie, an alternate universe, Victorian era-inspired version of Leslie Thompkins, appears in Batman: Gotham by Gaslight, voiced by Grey Griffin.

=== Video games ===
- Leslie Thompkins appears as a character summon in Scribblenauts Unmasked: A DC Comics Adventure.
- Leslie Thompkins appears in Batman: Arkham Shadow, voiced by Mara Junot.

== Reception ==
Though later retconned, the revelation in War Games that Thompkins intentionally let Stephanie Brown die was criticised as inconsistent with Thompkins' established characterisation as a pacifist. A contemporary review described her motive as making little sense and argued that the abrupt change had not been adequately developed. The plot development was criticised for its treatment of both Leslie and Stephanie. Comic Watch described the storyline as containing “awkward characterization” and mishandling the characters.
