= Batman: Arkham Unhinged =

American comic book series

- Cover of Batman: Arkham Unhinged #1

Publication information
- Publisher: DC Comics
- Schedule: Weekly
- Format: Ongoing series
- Genre: Superhero
- Publication date: October 2011 – January 2013
- No. of issues: 58
- Main character: Batman

Batman: Arkham Unhinged is an American comic book series published by the comic book publishing company DC Comics. Like the previous anthology, Batman: Arkham City, it acts as a tie-in to the events of the video game Batman: Arkham City, with stories set before and during the events of the game. Originally published online as 58 'chapters', it was later published in print as 20 issues. Chapters #1-43 were written by Derek Fridolfs and chapters #44-58 by Karen Traviss with a number of different artists.

== Storylines ==
Storyline	Chapters	Premise
"Inside Job"	#1–3	Hugo Strange's Tyger guards have succeeded in apprehending every "outlaw" in Gotham City, except for Catwoman, Two-Face, and Batman. Thanks to a tip-off from Two-Face, a Tyger strike team locates Catwoman's apartment and breaks in to arrest her. She evades them, but the commandos crack her wall safe and steal her most prized valuables. Furious, she confronts Two-Face while he is examining stolen blueprints of the Arkham City security facilities. Despite Batman's attempts to help her, both she and Two-Face are arrested and dragged to Arkham City, Catwoman furiously trying to grab a digital memory card from Two-Face with photos of the blueprints.
"Observations"	#4–6	Batman confers with Commissioner Gordon, sharing what little he knows of Strange's murky past. Gordon admits that the GCPD is largely impotent since Quincy Sharp declared martial law, and Strange's Tyger guards have become the ruling authority in Gotham City. They are interrupted by Tyger guards, sent to arrest both of them, but Batman has already disappeared, and Gordon appears politely baffled at the accusation that he has been consorting with a known outlaw.
"Ruffled Feathers"	#7–8	In his lair within Arkham City, the Penguin mulls over the origins of his bitter feud with the Joker, and vows to have revenge once his gang is powerful enough.
"Surgeon's General"	#9–10	In his private clinic, Hugo Strange interviews several people battered by Batman, including Arkham City inmates, and his own Tyger guards. The normally implacable Strange is inwardly troubled at how effectively Batman is inspiring fear in his otherwise rational victims, becoming less a man than a phantasm.
"Separation Anxiety"	#11–13	An origin story of the Abramovici twins who appear in Batman: Arkham City. Born Siamese twins in the former Soviet Union, the twins were discarded by their father and adopted by a traveling freak show, where they grew into strong and brutal animal wranglers. News of their abilities spread, and they were "liberated" by the Joker, who hired a corrupt surgeon named Thomas Elliot to separate them. The Joker kept the twin known as "Hammer," while the other, "Sickle," was thrown out into the street, and later recruited by the Penguin. While researching this history, Nightwing comments that it is odd for twin brothers to be working for opposing sides. Batman says the brothers' conjoinment forced them to get along, but that is no guarantee that they will do so after being separated.
"Theatre of Violence"	#14–16	Robin enters Arkham City to investigate rumors of an underground fight club, and finds it being run out of the Penguin's hideout in the city's old natural history museum. Bane intrudes and finds himself matched against Solomon Grundy.
"Arkham City Sirens"	#17–19	A brief team-up between Catwoman, Poison Ivy and Harley Quinn ends poorly, and later Ivy convinces Harley to help her get revenge by setting a trap for Catwoman, using a kidnapped Batman as bait.
"Crocodile Tears"	#20–22	Killer Croc reflects on his origins while roaming the sewers in search of food. A group of the Joker's henchmen searching for the Penguin's men stumble upon him, but Croc takes an unexpected liking to "Hammer", the Abramovici twin in the Joker's employ, and agrees, for the time being, to focus on devouring the Penguin's men.
"Vicki in Wonderland"	#23–25	The Mad Hatter "invites" Vicki Vale to his tea party with Catwoman, Poison Ivy and other entranced criminals.
"Operation: Kill Joker"	#26–28	Deadshot is hired by the Penguin to kill the Joker, but later returns to the Joker with a cache of weapons from the Penguin's private arsenal, revealing himself to be Clayface in disguise.
"Clown Court"	#29–31	Two-Face puts the Joker on trial with almost the entire inmate population of Arkham City as witnesses.
"Repentance"	#32–34	Quincy Sharp, former warden of Arkham Asylum and former mayor of Gotham City, has become Arkham City's newest inmate, and the entire population wants revenge. He takes refuge in the church, expressing remorse for allowing himself to be manipulated by Hugo Strange. When Bane appears to help in breaking down the church's fortified doors, Sharp volunteers to give himself up to save the other refugees in the church. This proves to be unnecessary when Azrael arrives to save the day.
"Eviction Notice"	#35–37	Black Mask is evicted by the Joker from his factory; he plans to kill him with the Penguin's help but is recaptured and re-sent to Arkham City.
"Beloved"	#38–40	Five years before the events of Batman: Arkham City, Bruce Wayne is reunited with Talia al Ghul, when she saves his life. In the present, they meet again and seem to rekindle their romance, but part company again when Bruce realizes she is testing his willingness to become Ra's al Ghul's heir. She returns to her father in disappointment, and he comforts her that he has found a new potential heir in Hugo Strange.
"Uninvited Guests"	#41–43	Hugo Strange sends his Tyger guards to attack Wayne Manor, where they confront Robin, Nightwing and Alfred.
"Welcome to the Slough of Despond"	#44–58	A new vigilante calling himself "the Bookbinder" attacks well-known people in Gotham, who he blames for contributing to the city's decline in education, health standards, and basic courtesy. Batman tries to figure out who he is and how to catch him, while Commissioner Gordon faces increasing pressure from Mayor Sharp to do the same.

== Collected editions ==
Title	Material collected	Published date	ISBN
Batman: Arkham Unhinged Vol. 1	Batman: Arkham Unhinged #1–5 (originally published as Batman: Arkham Unhinged chapters #1-13 and Batman: Arkham City chapters #6-7)	February 2012	978-1401237493
Batman: Arkham Unhinged Vol. 2	Batman: Arkham Unhinged #6–10 (originally published as Batman: Arkham Unhinged chapters #14-28)	August 2013	978-1401242831
Batman: Arkham Unhinged Vol. 3	Batman: Arkham Unhinged #11–15, Batman: Arkham Unhinged End Game #1 (originally published as Batman: Arkham Unhinged chapters #29-43 and Arkham City: End Game chapters #1-6)	January 2014	978-1401243050
Batman: Arkham Unhinged Vol. 4	Batman: Arkham Unhinged #16–20 (originally published as Batman: Arkham Unhinged chapters #43-58)	August 2014	978-1401246815
Batman: The Arkham Saga Omnibus	Batman: Arkham Unhinged #1-20 and Batman: Arkham Origins, Batman: Arkham Knight: Batgirl Begins #1, Batman: Arkham Asylum: The Road to Arkham #1, Batman: Arkham City #1-5, Batman: Arkham City digital chapters #1-7, Batman: Arkham City: End Game #1, Batman: Arkham Knight #1-12, Batman: Arkham Knight: Robin Special #1, Batman: Arkham Knight Annual #1, Batman: Arkham Knight: Batgirl and Harley Quinn #1, Batman: Arkham Knight Genesis #1-6.	September 2014	978-1401284329
