= Better to Reign in Hell... =

- Gotham episode
- Episode no.: Season 3 Episode 1
- Directed by: Danny Cannon
- Written by: John Stephens
- Editing by: Leland Sexton
- Production code: T13.19901
- Original air date: September 19, 2016
- Running time: 43 minutes

Guest appearances
- Jada Pinkett Smith as Fish Mooney; Richard Kind as Aubrey James; Clare Foley as Ivy Pepper; Tonya Pinkins as Ethel Peabody; James Carpinello as Mario Falcone; Leslie Hendrix as Kathryn; Jamie Chung as Valerie Vale

Episode chronology
← Previous "Transference"	Next → "Burn the Witch"
- Gotham season 3

× "Better to Reign in Hell..." is the first episode of the third season, and 45th episode overall from the Fox series Gotham. This is also the first episode in the series with the subtitle "Mad City". The episode was written by executive producer John Stephens and directed by Danny Cannon. It was first broadcast on September 19, 2016. In the episode, after seeing that Lee has been moving on with another man, Gordon leaves her. 6 months later, he has been working as a bounty hunter dedicated to catch Indian Hills' monsters. After an offer of a million dollars from Oswald Cobblepot for Fish Mooney, Gordon sets out to find her as she is leading the monsters. Meanwhile, Bruce and Alfred return after laying low and prepare to confront Wayne Enterprises about their role in Indian Hills.

The premiere brought the highest ratings since March 2016 and received mostly positive reviews, which highlighted the fast-paced tone and Alfred's and Talon's fight.

== Plot ==
Gordon (Benjamin McKenzie) arrives at Lee's (Morena Baccarin) address but watches through the window and sees her kissing another man (James Carpinello) and leaves, heartbroken. 6 months later and after the events of the season finale, Gordon has returned to Gotham City and has been working as a bounty hunter, chasing down a ridgeback monster that attacks a pharmacy. Gordon manipulates the monster to step on the road and the monster is hit by a truck.

In the GCPD, a Gotham Gazette reporter named Valerie Vale (Jamie Chung) questions Captain Barnes (Michael Chiklis) and Mayor Aubrey James (Richard Kind) and their efforts in catching the monsters. During the press conference, Harvey Bullock (Donal Logue) tries unsuccessfully to persuade Gordon to rejoin the police. Lucius Fox (Chris Chalk) is also revealed to be working as a scientific expert in the GCPD after the corruption within Wayne Enterprises. He states that the monsters were looking for a drug only available in three pharmacies. Cobblepot (Robin Lord Taylor), accompanied by Butch (Drew Powell), interrupts the press conference, accusing the GCPD of doing nothing to stop them and reveals to the press that the monster's leader is Fish Mooney (Jada Pinkett Smith).

Cobblepot and Butch then visit Sirens Nightclub owned by Barbara (Erin Richards) and Tabitha (Jessica Lucas). Cobblepot is proposing that they can use the club as a shelter for his business and also tells them to spread the word that he is offering a million dollars for whoever catches Fish Mooney. Butch is also heartbroken as Tabitha left him for Barbara. Selina (Camren Bicondova) tries to cheer him up and then steals his wallet. She meets with Ivy (Clare Foley) in an alley and gives money to a boy passing by. Unknown to them, the boy is none other than Bruce's doppelganger (David Mazouz). Meanwhile, Bruce and Alfred (Sean Pertwee) return to Gotham after leaving and trying to avoid the secret council while Bruce intends on confronting the Wayne Enterprises board members.

Vale encounters Gordon in the bar and offers to write a story about him but he is not interested. She then abruptly tells him of Cobblepot's reward for whoever brings Mooney, surprising Gordon. Cobblepot meets Edward Nygma (Cory Michael Smith) in Arkham Asylum to discuss his next move while leaving a puzzle as a gift to him. Nygma quickly solves the puzzle and reminds Cobblepot that "Penguins eat fish". Mooney, Selina and her gang break into a Gray Pharma lab to retrieve the drugs they are looking for. Gordon is given a lead by Fox and arrives at Gray Pharma and confronts Mooney but he is then attacked by a member of her gang, affording the others an opportunity to escape.

Bruce confronts the Wayne Enterprises board members and threatens to reveal the information and connection that they have to the Secret Council if they do not contact him within 24 hours. The White-Haired Woman is notified of this and sends a Talon to kill Bruce. Vale meets again with Selina, who tells her about Mooney's next move, to which she meets with Gordon and convinces him on getting the lead. Bruce meets with Selina and warns her of the imminent threat against him but she is convinced that she is safe, not knowing they are being watched by Bruce's doppelganger.

The lead takes Gordon and Vale to a house, but Gordon handcuffs Vale in the car to prevent her from being injured, explaining that she had been used as bait by Mooney and goes inside the building alone. Gordon finds Ethel Peabody (Tonya Pinkins). She had been released as she agreed to testify against Hugo Strange. Mooney's monsters arrive and take Peabody while Gordon once more, faces the monster from the labs. The monster tries to flee through the window, but as Gordon grabs him during the struggle, the monster reveals that it possesses bat wings. Gordon and Bullock are chastised by Barnes, and Bullock tells Gordon to stay away from the hunt as well as him. After speaking with Selina, Ivy is approached by Bruce's doppelganger who demands to know more about Bruce but she flees in fear, believing that she is speaking with the real Bruce Wayne.

Peabody is brought before Mooney, Selina and her gang, Peabody informs Mooney that her cells are rejecting the changes made to her DNA and the only way for Mooney to stop being attacked (following Mooney using her powers) and recover is to stop using them. Mooney responds by using her powers on Peabody who eventually reveals that the only person who can save her is Strange. Afterward, Mooney has a monster use his powers of aging to kill her, horrifying Selina. Soon, Ivy is caught after she has been following Selina. Ivy escapes while Selina tries to stop the monsters from harming her. As she reaches an alley with a sewage drain, Ivy is touched for a moment by the aging monster Marv before she falls down into a sewage pipe.

Bruce and Alfred begin to set an alarm system in Wayne Manor and after Bruce leaves the room, Alfred is confronted by Talon. Although he does his best to fight him off, Alfred is defeated and knocked unconscious by Talon. Bruce finds Alfred unconscious and is then taken away.

== Production ==
=== Development ===
In March 2016, the show was renewed for a 22-episode third season and on May, it was announced that the season was set to premiere on September 19, 2016. In June 2016, Drew Powell revealed on a tweet that the first episode of the season will be titled "Better to Reign in Hell..." and was to be directed by Danny Cannon and written by executive producer John Stephens. The episode's title is a reference to the line "Better to reign in hell than serve in heaven" from John Milton's Paradise Lost.

=== Writing ===
Ben McKenzie spoke about Gordon's new role as a bounty hunter, "He's just trying to get by. The only reason he's bounty hunting is to pay the bills and it also gives him that thrill of being in combat again, of having a challenge again. But the larger mission of cleaning up the city, he's kind of throwing his hands up in the air and said, 'I can't deal with this on an emotional and psychological level right now."

=== Casting ===
On June 20, 2016, Jamie Chung was cast as Valerie Vale, with the role being described as "a crackerjack reporter dead set on uncovering the truth behind Indian Hill. Confident and dogged, she will do anything to get the scoop, and soon sets her sights on Gordon, who she believes is the key lead in her story." The note also revealed that the character is the aunt of fellow comic book character Vicki Vale. 3 days later, James Carpinello was cast as Mario Falcone, son of Carmine Falcone, whose role was described as "Mario has rejected his family's criminal ways and made a legitimate life for himself as a well-respected, Ivy League-educated ER doctor. He's kind, honest and trustworthy, making him the black sheep of the Falcone clan." In August 2016, it was announced that the guest cast for the episode would include Jada Pinkett Smith as Fish Mooney, Richard Kind as Mayor Aubrey James, Clare Foley as Ivy Pepper, Tonya Pinkins as Ethel Peabody, James Carpinello as Mario Falcone, Leslie Hendrix as Kathryn, and Jamie Chung as Valerie Vale.

== Reception ==
=== Viewers ===
The episode was watched by 3.90 million viewers with a 1.3/4 share among adults aged 18 to 49. This was a 7% increase in viewership from the previous episode, which was watched by 3.62 million viewers with a 1.2/4 in the 18-49 demographics. This also brought the show's highest ratings since March 2016 but it was a 15% decrease in viewership from the second-season premiere, which was watched by 4.57 million viewers with a 1.6/5 in the demographics. With this rating, Gotham ranked second for FOX, behind Lucifer, fourth on its timeslot and eighth for the night on the 18-49 demographics, behind Lucifer, Dancing with the Stars, The Case Of: JonBenet Ramsey, The Good Place, Kevin Can Wait, The Voice and The Big Bang Theory.

The episode ranked as the 54th most watched show on the week. With Live+7 DVR viewing factored in, the episode had an overall rating of 6.14 million viewers, and a 2.2 in the 18–49 demographic.

=== Critical reviews ===
Professional ratings
Review scores
Source	Rating
Rotten Tomatoes (Tomatometer)	90%
Rotten Tomatoes (Average Score)	8.2
IGN	7.2
TV Fanatic	3.5/5.0 stars
TV Overmind	4.5/5.0 stars

"Mad City: Better to Reign in Hell..." received mostly positive reviews from critics. The episode received a rating of 90% with an average score of 8.2 out of 10 on the review aggregator Rotten Tomatoes with the consensus stating: "'Better to Reign in Hell...' is a gratifying premiere whose messiness is part of its intriguing charm.".

Matt Fowler of IGN gave the episode a "good" 7.2 out of 10 and wrote in his verdict, "Gotham's Season 3 opener was fairly typical of the series at this point. A ton of villains, old and new, and a driven, daring Bruce hell bent on getting himself killed (maybe Wayne Manor should have actual security at this point). Oh, and a grim, grunting Jim Gordon - which actually works this time because he's done with being a cop, which is the best thing this season's got going for it so far."

Erik Kain of Forbes wrote, "In other words, while I enjoyed the Season 3 premiere and am curious to see where all this is going, right now there's a lot of moving pieces in the air and not a lot of direction. That's okay. Things are just ramping back up. But it's a lot to take in, and a lot of plots and subplots to juggle."

Nick Hogan of TV Overmind gave the series a star rating of 4.0 out of 5, writing "Overall, I'm extremely pleased. I didn't think it was perfect, but it asked a lot of questions that I'm eager to know the answers to, like what's up with this controlling group at Wayne Enterprises? And how will Leslie work her way back onto the show? Will Gordon become a policeman again? I really want to know what's up with this Bruce clone, too. The premiere asked a lot of interesting questions, that hopefully the show will answer throughout the season. I'm really excited that this show is back, and to be covering it going forward!"

Sage Young of EW stated: "Last time around, Gotham touted the 'Rise of the Villains' in a season title that was both apt and not. The bad went worse, to be sure, but this city has never been home to sunshine and rainbows. In the end, that title was revealed to be somewhat ironic. The most powerful villains in Gotham took hold long ago and conduct their business in secret. Or at least they did, until their cover was blown by a major jailbreak."

Lisa Babick from TV Fanatic, gave a 4.5 star rating out of 5.0, stating: "Overall, Gotham's season premiere was a solid start to what's going to be an exciting season. Despite some head-scratching moments, we were given some interesting threads that will be fun to follow as the season progresses. Fish wasn't as obnoxious as I thought she'd be (she handed that trophy to Barbara), Valerie Vale is a refreshing addition, the monsters are going to be a lot of fun, and Bruce is going to be awesome!" Vinnie Mancuso of The New York Observer wrote, "I applaud the fact that Gotham, never one to shy away from a cheap comics nod, seems to have simply made up their own gang of weirdos for the Arkham Asylum escapees."

MaryAnn Sleasman of TV.com questioned the episode, stating "If Gotham could simply stop forcing Batman's presence into the series and embrace the fact that this is a time before the Dark Knight, that their sandbox is deep and full of awesome toys, that the audience doesn't need an 'almost' Batman or a 'pre-Batman' Batman to stay interested in the series, half of the problems with uneven storytelling would be solved. This series is in a nice, seasoned third season and we still have to worry that for every great storytelling decision it makes, Gotham will follow it with something completely terrible. I can't take that kind of stress. At this point in a series' lifespan, we should be comfy-cozy, not perpetually expecting the worst."

Alexander Zalben of TV Guide wrote, "Regardless, Gotham is finally a show about a city and the people who live in it, not just a Batman origin story biding time until young Bruce Wayne puts on his costume. And, just as our group of misfits has it all figured out -- in the premiere, everyone seems resigned to yet another monster attack, and even know each other so well that sequences become a series of intellectual chess matches interrupted by crazy violence -- enter a new villain, who comic readers know is the spirit of order and control in Gotham City fighting back. A perfect foil for the beautiful disorder Gotham has become." Robert Yaniz, Jr. of Screen Rant wrote, "There's the matter of Bruce's mysterious doppelgänger, who was among the Indian Hill escapees and who — much like the actual Bruce — seems to have taken a liking to Selina (Camren Bicondova). For months, fans have speculated on how the character might tie to the comics, but this premiere offers little hint beyond the fact that he doesn't appear to be inherently evil thus far. Then again, neither did many other of Gotham's now-regular villainous figures. So we'll see what the future holds for emo Bruce."

Kayti Burt of Den of Geek gave the episode a 3.5 star rating out of 5 and wrote, "Can Jim Gordon please stay a bounty hunter forever? This day-drinking, money-driven version of Gordon is about a hundred times more interesting than the uneven, self-righteous police officer we've had to hang out with for Gotham seasons one and two. This is what Gotham looks like when the burden of being the primary protagonist is alleviated from Gordon's character and, instead, he gets to be one part of a larger ensemble. Gotham has never felt this well-balanced, and I hope it continues..."
