= Batman: Arkham City (comic book) =

American comic book limited series

- Cover of Batman: Arkham City #1

Publication information
- Publisher: DC Comics
- Schedule: Monthly
- Format: Limited series
- Genre: Superhero
- Publication date: July – October 2014
- No. of issues: 5
- Main character(s): Batman; Hugo Strange; Joker

Creative team
- Written by: Paul Dini
- Artist: Carlos D'Anda
- Letterer: Travis Lanham
- Colorist: Gabriel Eltaeb
- Editor(s): Jim Chadwick; Chynna Clugston

Batman: Arkham City is a five-issue American comic book limited series written by Paul Dini, drawn by Carlos D'Anda and published by the comic book publishing company DC Comics. It bridges the storylines of Batman: Arkham Asylum and Batman: Arkham City.

== Plot ==
The Arkham City comic book tie-in series is set six months before the events of Batman: Arkham City: A riot orchestrated by the villainous Joker had occurred at the asylum, which served as a mental institute for the criminally insane housing Batman's worst enemies. The Dark Knight was able to bring it under control, but not before Arkham was left in ruins following a final showdown with his nemesis, who had injected himself and numerous other test subjects with Titan, a Venom super-steroid derivative which had the ability to turn men into maddened monsters. A mutated, beastly, Joker attempted to destroy Batman during the chaos, but after his eventual defeat was left sickly and weakened.

Meanwhile, Arkham Asylum administrator Quincy Sharp takes the credit for bringing his charges back under control that night, using this false pretense to successfully become the elected Mayor of Gotham City. His attempts to make elaborate public gestures and construct a new city hall are subsequently targeted by a terrorist duo named "T&T", superpowered thugs who were addicted to the Titan formula. In their ensuing murder spree, three hundred Gotham civilians are killed. This gives Sharp the pretext he needs to declare martial law and give himself almost unlimited legal powers under an imposed state of emergency.

Batman, wary of Sharp's secret new plans for Gotham, proceeds to investigate his records, discovering that the mayor is obsessed with him and that he is bordering on being declared a public enemy. Around this same time, the Caped Crusader also comes to the conclusion that someone has been manipulating Sharp behind the scenes; he is merely a puppet in a much larger game. The concept of "Arkham City" is then unveiled shortly afterwards: Arkham Asylum and the local penitentiary are closed – permanently. Arrangements are then made for their respective inmates to be moved to a new location. The result is Sharp's most ambitious and controversial project yet: to wall off half of the city as an open-air detention area reserved only for society's criminal elements. Prisoners housed inside will not be kept in cells but allowed to degenerate into warring factions reveling in anarchy; these lawbreakers will be segregated from the rest of Gotham by heavily fortified defences diligently monitored by a private military company under Sharp's direction: Tyger Security.

Batman, realizing that the mayor's dreadful "solution" to the rising crime rate will light the fuse to a powder keg, infiltrates Arkham City to observe the atmosphere inside. His three greatest enemies, the Joker, Two-Face and the Penguin, are already busily carving up the greater share of Arkham's turf for themselves. The former, having realized that he has only six months to live due to an overexposure to Titan, is planning to cause as much chaos as possible before his demise, while the latter is stockpiling enough smuggled arms to start a small war. To further complicate matters, shady psychiatrist Hugo Strange comes out of the shadows as the outside influence who has been sowing the seeds of the prison city project all along; he issues orders directing Tyger's highly trained operators to hunt down and kill Batman on sight.

Sharp's thugs succeed in rounding up every last remaining citizen with even a minor criminal record, along with numerous "political" prisoners who know too much about the mysterious Professor Strange. The gates swing shut on Arkham City for the final time, trapping hundreds of innocents inside with the world's worst freaks, gangsters, and madmen. Strange is openly announced as the absolute authority in charge of the project, and Bruce Wayne's attempts to derail this by exposing some of the doctor's unethical past are to little avail.

Strange emerges as the key antagonist behind the scenes: He currently wields absolute power in local politics and the criminal underworld. Even the most powerful villains must now submit to his authority or forge an uneasy alliance, and the ruthless Tyger troops are prepared to deal swiftly with those who refuse. Everyone, friend and foe, has become a pawn to be moved about on the chessboard, and the stakes Hugo is playing for could not be higher. Armed with the deduced knowledge of Batman's secret identity as Bruce Wayne, he intends to seize everything his opponent has, crush his spirit, and take his place as a legend, thus achieving for himself twisted immortality.

== Collected editions ==
| Title | Material collected | Published date | ISBN |
|---|---|---|---|
| Batman: Arkham City | Batman: Arkham City #1–5 | July-October 2014 | 978-1401232559 |
| Batman: The Arkham Saga Omnibus | Batman: Arkham City #1-5 and Batman: Arkham Unhinged #1-20, Batman: Arkham Origins, Batman: Arkham Knight: Batgirl Begins #1, Batman: Arkham Asylum: The Road to Arkham #1, Batman: Arkham City digital chapters #1-7, Batman: Arkham City: End Game #1, Batman: Arkham Knight #1-12, Batman: Arkham Knight: Robin Special #1, Batman: Arkham Knight Annual #1, Batman: Arkham Knight: Batgirl and Harley Quinn #1, Batman: Arkham Knight Genesis #1-6. | September 2014 | 978-1401284329 |

== Reception ==
IGN gave Batman: Arkham City #1 an 8.5 "Great" Rating, Batman: Arkham City #2 an 7.5 "Good" Rating, Batman: Arkham City #3 an 7.5 "Good" Rating, Batman: Arkham City #4 an 8.5 "Great" Rating and Batman: Arkham City #5 an 7 "Good" Rating.

== See also ==
- Batman: Arkham Unhinged
