= A Legion of Horribles =

- Gotham episode
- Title shot
- Episode no.: Season 2 Episode 21
- Directed by: Rob Bailey
- Written by: Jordan Harper
- Cinematography by: Crescenzo Notarile
- Production code: 4X6221
- Original air date: May 16, 2016
- Running time: 42 minutes

Guest appearances
- Jada Pinkett Smith as Fish Mooney; B. D. Wong as Dr. Hugo Strange; Tonya Pinkins as Ethel Peabody; Clare Foley as Ivy Pepper; Michelle Veintimilla as Bridgit Pike; Kit Flanagan as the White-Haired Woman; Brian McManamon as Basil Karlo

Episode chronology
← Previous "Unleashed"	Next → "Transference"
- Gotham season 2

"A Legion of Horribles" is the twenty-first and penultimate episode of the second season, and 43rd episode overall from the Fox series Gotham. The episode was written by supervising producer Jordan Harper and directed by Rob Bailey. It was first broadcast on May 16, 2016. In the episode, after Azrael's death, Hugo Strange resurrects Fish Mooney. Meanwhile, Bruce sets out to save Selina, who has been attacked by Bridgit Pike, now calling herself "Firefly". This episode marks the return of Jada Pinkett Smith to the series, after her character was killed off in the first-season finale. On January 29, 2016, she announced her return to the series. She previously stated that she would not return for the second season. This episode also marks the debut of Clayface. The title is a reference to a passage from the 1985 novel Blood Meridian by Cormac McCarthy.

The episode received generally positive reviews, with critics praising the character development for most characters but some criticizing Fish Mooney's return.

== Plot ==
Selina (Camren Bicondova) is now hiding inside the room while Bridgit (Michelle Veintimilla) is using her flamethrower to try to kill her. Selina manages to knock Bridgit out. Meanwhile, on the balcony, Bruce (David Mazouz) waits for Selina, only to be visited by Ivy (Clare Foley). He then decides to save Selina from Arkham and goes with Gordon (Ben McKenzie) for help. In the GCPD, Harvey Bullock (Donal Logue) announces to the media Azrael's death caused by "unknown perpetrator(s)". In an unknown location, a woman calls someone to state that Hugo Strange is losing control and they need to "gather the court".

In Arkham Asylum, Strange (B. D. Wong) along with Peabody (Tonya Pinkins), are now performing a test on a patient, Basil Karlo (Brian McManamon), who can now stretch his skin. Peabody tells Strange that "they" are now questioning his methods and may shut it off, but Strange shrugs it off, stating that he has resurrected dead people. He then decides to perform a resurrection test on "Subject 13": Fish Mooney (Jada Pinkett Smith).

In Wayne Manor, Alfred (Sean Pertwee) is furious upon finding out that Bruce sent Selina to Arkham. Gordon talks with Lucius Fox (Chris Chalk) about infiltrating Arkham Asylum to find the secret lab and they, along with Bruce, decide to go. Strange successfully resurrects Mooney, and she's given a new suit. But unlike the others that Strange brought back, Mooney fully remembers her past life.

While Bruce talks with Strange, Lucius uses a device to find the passage to Indian Hill, leaving a mark for Gordon to find. When Bruce confronts Strange about his parents' death, he orders his orderlies to lock up Bruce, Gordon and Lucius. He and Mrs. Peabody are then confronted by the mysterious woman for not bringing back a dead person with his past memories. When Strange states that he did it for Mooney and can do it again, the woman states that when he's done, he needs to destroy Indian Hill labs. Meanwhile, Mooney realizes she has the power of manipulation with a touch of her hand.

Selina tries to use the flamethrower to open the door but fails. Bridgit regains consciousness and takes another flamethrower. Selina manages to restore some of Bridgit's memories but she is still planning on killing her. Selina is forced to harm her with the flamethrower but to her shock, Bridgit is now immune to the fire as her fire-proof suit was fused to her. Lucius and Bruce are locked in the chair room while Edward Nygma (Cory Michael Smith) taunts them over a microphone. He tells them they need to tell him everything they know or they will be killed by a lethal gas in five minutes.

Gordon is taken to Strange who places an artifact on his head. Moments later, they take off the artifact and he comes face to face with Basil. Basil then puts the artifact on his own head, which begins to mutate. Meanwhile, Bullock orders the police to lead a raid into Arkham Asylum, Selina and Bridgit are now working to escape the room, and Mooney plans her escape. The artifact is taken off Basil's head to reveal that Basil's face is now identical to Gordon. Basil is given a wig to complete his look, while the real Gordon stares in shock.

== Production ==
=== Development ===
In April 2016, it was announced that the twenty-first episode of the season would be titled "A Legion of Horribles", and was to be written by Jordan Harper, with Rob Bailey directing.

=== Casting ===
Morena Baccarin, Robin Lord Taylor, Erin Richards, James Frain, Jessica Lucas, Drew Powell, Nicholas D'Agosto, and Michael Chiklis don't appear in the episode as their respective characters. In April 2016, it was announced that the guest cast for the episode would include Jada Pinkett Smith as Fish Mooney, B. D. Wong as Professor Hugo Strange, Tonya Pinkins as Ethel Peabody, Clare Foley as Ivy Pepper, Michelle Veintimilla as Bridgit Pike, Kit Flanagan as the White-Haired Woman, and Brian McManamon as Basil Karlo.

== Reception ==
=== Viewers ===
The episode was watched by 3.84 million viewers with a 1.3/4 share among adults aged 18 to 49. This was a 4% increase in viewership from the previous episode, which was watched by 3.67 million viewers. With this rating, Gotham ranked first for FOX, beating Houdini & Doyle, fourth on its timeslot and ninth for the night on the 18-49 demographics, behind Blindspot, The Odd Couple, Castle, a rerun of The Big Bang Theory, two episodes of Mike & Molly, Dancing with the Stars and The Voice.

It was also the 26th most watched of the week in the 18-49 demographics and the 53rd most watched overall in the week. With Live+7 DVR viewing factored in, the episode had an overall rating of 5.72 million viewers, and a 2.1 in the 18–49 demographic.

=== Critical reviews ===
Professional ratings
Review scores
Source	Rating
Rotten Tomatoes (Tomatometer)	75%
Rotten Tomatoes (Average Score)	6.7
IGN	7.6
The A.V. Club	C−
TV Fanatic	4.5/5.0 stars
TV Overmind	4.0/5.0 stars

"Wrath of the Villains: A Legion of Horribles" received generally positive reviews from critics. The episode received a rating of 75% with an average score of 6.7 out of 10 on the review aggregator Rotten Tomatoes.

Matt Fowler of IGN gave the episode a "good" 7.6 out of 10 and wrote in his verdict, "'A Legion of Horribles' messily worked its butt off to get everyone into one spot. And while Clayface and the Court's debuts were fun, Fish Mooney's return felt like a curious decision given how crowded the show is now and the mixed reactions she received back in Season 1."

The A.V. Club's Kyle Fowle gave the episode a "C−" grade and wrote, "Gotham consistently tosses emotional investment to the side. Or, rather, a lack of emotional investment in these characters (Gordon, Bruce Wayne, Selina Kyle, etc.) is a product of the show's style of storytelling, which is more about 'moments' than it is carefully-planned and executed arcs. 'Wrath Of The Villains: A Legion Of Horribles' certainly backs up the latter point, that Gotham's insistent focus on cramming characters and subplots into its main story (when there actually is a main story) leaves a lot to be desired. When you've finished watching 'A Legion Of Horribles' you're left with a distinct feeling that something happened, but also that none of it matters. When the most memorable and impactful moment is the return of a character everybody knew was coming back because of heavy promotion, there's a serious problem."

Andy Behbakht of TV Overmind gave the series a star rating of 4 out of 5, writing "Overall, 'A Legion of Horribles' lived up to its title as it sets up what I bet will be a crazy season finale next week."

Keertana Sastry of EW stated: "And thus concludes another episode of The Bad Guys Always Win. From the return of Fish to Ed's killer new gig for Hugo Strange, 'A Legion of Horribles' set up what is sure to be an explosive finale of Hugo Strange and his monsters vs. everyone else. Tonight, we also caught a glimpse of Hugo's employer (henceforth known as the Masked Lady), and what his monsters can really do."

Lisa Babick from TV Fanatic, gave a 4.5 star rating out of 5.0, stating: "It's getting a little crazy at Arkham. Strange has become drunk with power and is reanimating all of Gotham's monster minds left and right. Even Ethel, aka Ms. Peabody is a little concerned. (Yes, her name is Ethel! Who knew?!) It's still unclear what Strange's overall plan is bringing people back to life, but we now know that there's someone bigger than Strange pulling the strings. The white haired lady with the weird convoluted voice is apparently a member (maybe even the leader) of the Court of Owls. I'm not a comic book buff by any means, but the Court of Owls is an organized crime group and secret society that's been in Gotham for a very, very long time." Karmen Fox of The Baltimore Sun wrote positively about the episode, "Bruce's mission to find his parents' killer just got a little more complicated. 'Legion of Horribles' is a big episode. Bruce finally faces Dr. Strange, the supposed man behind his parents' murder. Or is there someone even more maniacal above him? Then, the writers neatly lay out the battleground for next week's season finale. All the villains are either brought back to life or getting into formation. The good guys, meanwhile, get trapped at Arkham's creepy laboratory while trying to save Selina."

MaryAnn Sleasman of TV.com wrote negatively about the episode, stating "No. Please no. Not this hammy nonsense again. Gotham has evolved in Fish's absence, and while it's still completely nutrageous at times—Azrael, the Maniax, Penguin's rocket launcher—Season 2 grounded Gotham in something resembling its own version of 'realism.' The craziness was dialed back. The casting has been on point. The visible and narrative tone has taken a turn for the serious, and Season 2 Gotham has forged forward with Baby Batman and Hilariously Unlikeable Jim Gordon with confidence. What once were weaknesses — Baby Batman was too Batman-y too fast; Jim Gordon was unbearably unlikable in a totally unfunny way — have been turned into strengths of their own. Bruce's story has turned genuinely interesting, with his relationship with Selina forming the foundation for all the hard decisions we know he will have to make as Batman later on in his life. Gordon is... well. Gotham has a multitude of other non-sucky characters to distract audiences. Unfortunately, Fish isn't one of them."
