= Transference (Gotham) =

- Gotham episode
- Episode no.: Season 2 Episode 22
- Directed by: Eagle Egilsson
- Written by: Bruno Heller
- Cinematography by: Crescenzo Notarile
- Production code: 4X6222
- Original air date: May 23, 2016
- Running time: 43 minutes

Guest appearances
- Jada Pinkett Smith as Fish Mooney; B. D. Wong as Dr. Hugo Strange; Tonya Pinkins as Ethel Peabody; Nathan Darrow as Victor Fries/Mr. Freeze; Michelle Veintimilla as Bridgit Pike; Kit Flanagan as the White-Haired Woman

Episode chronology
← Previous "A Legion of Horribles"	Next → "Better to Reign in Hell..."
- Gotham season 2

"Transference" is the twenty-second episode and season finale of the second season, and 44th episode overall from the Fox series Gotham. This is also the last episode in the series with the subtitle "Wrath of the Villains". The episode was written by developer and showrunner Bruno Heller and directed by Eagle Egilsson. It was first broadcast on May 23, 2016. In the episode, Lucius and Bruce are being held in a room by Nygma, ready to kill them unless they tell him information. Meanwhile, Gordon tries to stop Professor Strange once and for all while Basil Karlo begins to fake being Gordon after his experiment. The episode marked the end of the Strange story arc, which culminated with his arrest. The episode is also dedicated to the memory of Doug Kraner, production designer of the show, who died on April 4, 2016, at the age of 65 of cancer.

== Plot ==
The GCPD arrive at Arkham Asylum, ready to storm the gate. Suddenly, Basil (Benjamin McKenzie), assuming Gordon's identity, tells the cops to stand down. In the basement, Strange (B. D. Wong) prepares to detonate a bomb that will destroy the Indian Hill labs, and tells Ms. Peabody (Tonya Pinkins) to transfer the patients to another upstate facility.

Bruce (David Mazouz) and Lucius (Chris Chalk) are taunted by Nygma (Cory Michael Smith) in the chamber. Strange meets with Gordon and administers him a truth serum in order to get him to reveal his plans, also asking about Wayne Enterprises and referencing a "secret council". At the GCPD, Basil convinces everyone that he is Gordon, but Bullock (Donal Logue) remains skeptical. Nygma asks Lucius and Bruce a series of increasingly difficult questions; when they fail to answer the last question, Nygma releases the gas through nozzles in the ceiling, rendering them unconscious.

The prisoner transfer begins in Arkham, where Mooney (Jada Pinkett Smith) fails to touch the orderlies' hands, and is consequently unable to manipulate them. Lucius and Bruce find themselves in the room with Gordon; the threat was a ruse to know about Wayne Enterprises and the gas was only anesthetic. Strange then meets with Nygma and locks him again in his cell. Strange contacts the White-Haired Woman (Kit Flanagan), who orders him to destroy the Indian Hill labs as planned. In Dahl Manor, Cobblepot (Robin Lord Taylor), Butch (Drew Powell) and Barbara (Erin Richards) learn of the recent events at Arkham.

Selina (Camren Bicondova) finds Bruce, who apologises for manipulating her and tells her to escape if she has the chance. Peabody goes to move Mooney, but Mooney is able to use her ability on her. A shocked Strange discovers Mooney's ability, which caused many patients to escape, and runs off before she can touch him. Peabody finds him, but Strange knocks her out before triggering the bomb's countdown and shutting off the gates before anyone escapes.

Basil's attitude begins to worry Bullock and Alfred (Sean Pertwee). Visiting the GCPD, Barbara becomes suspicious of Basil's behavior. After Basil insults Lee, Barbara slaps him, which damages his face and uncovers the ruse. Strange tells Victor Fries (Nathan Darrow), Bridgit (Michelle Veintimilla) and Selina to kill the prisoners. When Selina objects, Strange orders Fries to kill her; Bridgit comes to her defense, buying her time to free Bruce, Gordon and Lucius, and the group pursue Strange. They discover Strange's plans to detonating the labs, and Strange is wounded in the crossfire between Fries and Bridgit.

Strange regains consciousness and desperately attempts to get out before the bomb explodes. The group use Nygma to deactivate the security elevator, and Gordon and Lucius reach the basement to deactivate the bomb. When Ms. Peabody utters "water", they pour water in the bomb, causing it to overload and stop. Meanwhile, as the police arrive, Mooney escapes in a bus alongside Strange's other prisoners. As the police begin a hunt for her around Gotham, the bus is accosted by Cobblepot, Butch and their gang. Butch uses a minigun to take down the bus, confusing the driver for Strange. A horrified Cobblepot faints upon seeing Mooney alive, while Butch and the gang flee.

In the aftermath, Strange is arrested, and Gordon informs Bruce that he is leaving to find Lee. Bruce tells Alfred about the secret council that secretly rule Gotham from the shadows. Gordon puts Bullock in charge of the GCPD and Gotham now that new threats have emerged, and speeds off in Bullock's car.

Meanwhile, a woman passes by the wrecked prison bus and hears the prisoners crying out for help. She opens the door only to collapse in shock as the now-freed monsters emerge. One of the prisoners, a boy who is identical to Bruce, thanks the woman for freeing them before walking away.

== Production ==
=== Development ===
In May 2016, it was announced that the twenty-second and final episode of the season would be titled "Transference", and was to be written by developer and showrunner Bruno Heller, with Eagle Egilsson directing.

=== Casting ===
Morena Baccarin, James Frain, Jessica Lucas, Nicholas D'Agosto and Michael Chiklis don't appear in the episode as their respective characters. In May 2016, it was announced that the guest cast for the episode would include Jada Pinkett Smith as Fish Mooney, B. D. Wong as Professor Hugo Strange, Tonya Pinkins as Ethel Peabody, Nathan Darrow as Victor Fries, Michelle Veintimilla as Bridgit Pike, and Kit Flanagan as the White-Haired Woman. Cameron Monaghan additionally has an uncredited vocal cameo as a clone of Jerome Valeska.

== Reception ==
=== Viewers ===
The episode was watched by 3.62 million viewers with a 1.2/4 share among adults aged 18 to 49. This was a 6% decrease in viewership from the previous episode, which was watched by 3.84 million viewers. The episode was also a decrease in viewership from the previous season finale, which was watched by 4.93 million viewers and also from the season premiere, which was watched by 4.57 million viewers. With this rating, Gotham ranked first for FOX, beating Houdini & Doyle, fourth on its timeslot and sixth for the night on the 18-49 demographics, behind Blindspot, The Price is Right Primetime Special, Dancing with the Stars, The Bachelorette and The Voice.

It was also the 17th most watched of the week in the 18-49 demographics and the 44th most watched overall in the week. With Live+7 DVR viewing factored in, the episode had an overall rating of 5.55 million viewers, and a 2.0 in the 18–49 demographic. Overall, the second season of Gotham averaged 5.37 million viewers, which was a 29% decrease in viewership from the last season, which averaged 7.56 million viewers.

=== Critical reviews ===
Professional ratings
Review scores
Source	Rating
Rotten Tomatoes (Tomatometer)	67%
Rotten Tomatoes (Average Score)	5.4
IGN	6.5
The A.V. Club	C−
TV Fanatic	3.5/5.0 stars
TV Overmind	4.5/5.0 stars

"Wrath of the Villains: Transference" received generally positive reviews from critics. The episode received a rating of 67% with an average score of 5.4 out of 10 on the review aggregator Rotten Tomatoes with the consensus stating: "While lacking the previous episode's urgency, 'Transference' compensates with fun - and by wrapping up most of the season's storylines with a delightfully bizarre twist".

Matt Fowler of IGN gave the episode an "okay" 6.5 out of 10 and wrote in his verdict, "'Transference' certainly wrapped up everything here in Season, but given the circumstances coming out of last week's penultimate episode, this one lacked urgency throughout. Strange was ordered to evacuate and destroy Indian Hill but, in the end, he basically 'made an afternoon out of it.' Relying on Clayface's tragically inept performance as Gordon to stall the cops. An impersonation designed to be funny, I guess, but it was a bit of farce that landed with a thud."

The A.V. Club's Kyle Fowle gave the episode a "C−" grade and wrote, "'Wrath of The Villains: Transference' suggests that, no, the show hasn't done much to make Gotham feel lived-in, like an actual dangerous place to work and live. In fact, it's not until the end of the episode that the titular villains find their way into the streets. Instead, this season has skated by on vague nods to the DC canon, including brief moments with Mr. Freeze, Firefly, Hugo Strange, and most recently, the Court of Owls, though they're currently just a 'secret council' that controls the whole city. 'Transference' is almost hilarious in how it exposes the flaws of this season, namely in terms of creating meaningful stakes from one week to the next. The entire episode is built around Bruce finding out about a 'secret council,' Fish Mooney escaping Indian Hill with a bus full of monsters, and Jim Gordon discovering some sort of inner peace, but there's no dramatic stakes in those stories. Ultimately, 'Transference' is representative of this season as a whole. It's occasionally interesting, but mostly just a dull collection of scenes that have no bearing on any sort of overarching narrative. The second season of Gotham has proven that the show has very little ability to plan for the future, to put stories into motion and then pay them off in a rewarding way down the road. Instead, the show stumbles from one week to the next, paying little attention to character motivations or plot continuity, and instead hoping that an assortment of vague villains and murky themes will carry the show. Gotham isn't in a worse place than it was last year, but it's certainly not growing."

Andy Behbakht of TV Overmind gave the series a star rating of 4.5 out of 5, writing "Overall, 'Transference' was a really satisfying and solid season finale that shows that Gotham has learned from its first season and taken the opportunity to do major improvements. While it has its flaws, what show doesn't? The show succeeded in finding itself a lot this year and while it does pretty much stand as an Elseworld-take on the Batman mythology, it knows what it is and embraces it which deserves praise big time. Hopefully San Diego Comic-Con will give us some good peaks into what is to come!"

Keertana Sastry of EW stated: "The Hugo Strange story line came to an abrupt halt on Monday's season finale of Gotham, but what's left me the most confused about 'Wrath of the Villains: Transference' is the complete 180 of James Gordon. Is one drug-induced therapy session with Professor Strange really all it takes to lift decades of guilt and burden off of Gordon's shoulders so much so that he shirks his desire for justice and protection of his city in what could be its greatest time of need?"

Lisa Babick from TV Fanatic, gave a 3.5 star rating out of 5.0, stating: "For all its ridiculousness, there were some moments I really enjoyed this hour. The fight scene between Mr. Freeze and Firefly was pretty cool. Even though I thought the whole Firefly taking on Selina as an assistant thing was goofy, I liked how she was willing to fight to protect her friend. It made me wonder if the real Bridgit was still alive underneath all of Strange's experiments. I also really liked the whole bomb thing. It was fun because it was so over-the-top silly and was made even better by Lucius' facial expressions when he saw exactly what they were facing. I still don't get what Lucius was thinking when he agreed to accompany Bruce on this trip, but I'm glad he was there. " Karmen Fox of The Baltimore Sun wrote positively about the episode, "'Transference' was a far superior ending to the season than last year's finale. But that’s not saying much. I'm still bitter that they rushed Barbara's descent into madness (Really? She goes to go from traumatized PTSD victim to Stockholm syndrome hostage to maniacal killer in three episodes?). Plus, Fish Mooney's death in last year's finale was weak. That's why I'm not even mad that they brought her back and are letting her stay around next season. Not to mention that I like Fish, even if Jada Pinkett Smith (a Baltimore native) can be a smidge melodramatic. But back to this year's finale. Though somewhat rushed, 'Transference' was an action-packed ending, wrapping up several plotlines while only keeping a few questions unanswered."

MaryAnn Sleasman of TV.com wrote positively about the episode, stating "I'm just going to come right out and say it: 'Transference' would have been great if it hadn't positioned Fish Mooney to be a major player when Gotham returns for Season 3. It had everything — Edward Nygma hosting the worst game show ever, Firefly vs. Mr. Freeze, Selina being awesome, Bruce being awesome, LUCIUS M. F-ing FOX, Penguin home decorating tips and the Court of Owls. Oh, I mean the 'Secret Court.' Whatever. It's the Court of Owls, and the Court of Owls is awesome. "

Megan Vick of TV Guide wrote, "Even if Gotham decides to make the clone just a Dark Bruce Wayne instead of going the Lincoln March route, it's a game changing twist for the show. It shows just how much they are willing to embrace their darker (and completely insane) side. An evil Bruce Wayne is the cherry on top of a resurrected Fish Mooney (Jada Pinkett Smith) and Dr. Freeze (Nathan Darrow) ice cream sundae. We are definitely ready to see a grittier -- not just sad -- side of Bruce Wayne and to see what Mazouz is made of, even in that terrible wig." Robert Yaniz, Jr. of ScreenRant wrote, "Gotham season 2 has come to a close, as the ongoing saga involving Hugo Strange and his experiments at Indian Hill reaches a major turning point. Likewise, this episode elaborates on the return of Fish Mooney last week and aims to tie together the disparate story threads that have extended throughout much of the season. As fans await further news for what to expect in season 3, there's still the matter of wrapping up this year's batch of episodes. At least when someone needs a good punch to the face, Barbara’s there to propel the plot forward. Here's hoping that the writers figure out a better use for her next season or just write her off for good."

Rob Leane of Den of Geek wrote, "Holy cliffhanger, Batman! Because no geeky TV show can end a season without a big tease of things to come anymore, we're left with a lot to ponder as Gotham departs our screens for a few months. With season 3 already confirmed, Bruno Heller and co. opted to leave things very open here. But still, we had some good scenes this week (Jim on the serum, Clayface getting slapped, Bruce trying to answer Ed's questions) and some interesting teases of things to come. Next year Bruce and Alfred will be on the hunt of The Court Of Owls (Sean Pertwee's 'oh bloody hell' was a highlight of this week), Jim will be looking for Leigh (at least to start with) and a new band of baddies (including... another David Mazouz! Is he an evil clone or a secret brother or what? I've no idea at the moment) will be plaguing the city. I'm looking forward to all of that, and I did enjoy some elements of Transference, but can't shake the feeling that this wasn't a very strong finale. It felt more like a midseason finale episode, not bothering to resolve anything and ending on a cliffhanger..."
