= Unleashed (Gotham) =

- Gotham episode
- Episode no.: Season 2 Episode 20
- Directed by: Paul Edwards
- Written by: Danny Cannon
- Cinematography by: Christopher Norr
- Production code: 4X6220
- Original air date: May 9, 2016
- Running time: 43 minutes

Guest appearances
- B. D. Wong as Dr. Hugo Strange; Tonya Pinkins as Ethel Peabody; Michelle Veintimilla as Bridgit Pike

Episode chronology
← Previous "Azrael"	Next → "A Legion of Horribles"
- Gotham season 2

"Unleashed" is the twentieth episode of the second season, and 42nd episode overall from the Fox series Gotham. The episode was written by executive producer Danny Cannon and directed by Paul Edwards. It was first broadcast on 9 May 2016. In the episode, Azrael continues his killing spree across Gotham City while Dr. Strange tries to evade arrest for his experiments.

The episode received positive reviews with critics commenting on Galavan/Azrael's fate as well as the Bridgit reveal.

== Plot ==
Gordon (Benjamin McKenzie), Bullock (Donal Logue) and police officers arrive at Arkham Asylum with a warrant to inspect Professor Strange's (B. D. Wong) office. But Strange is one step ahead of them as he shredded all documents. Meanwhile, Nygma (Cory Michael Smith) is disturbed after discovering the Indian Hill labs and decides that he needs to escape. Azrael (James Frain) arrives at a church and asks the priest for a new sword, but when the priest tells him he has none, Azrael kills him.

With Captain Barnes (Michael Chiklis) still in hospital, Bullock is declared de facto captain. Bruce (David Mazouz) decides to go with Selina (Camren Bicondova) to find a way to enter Arkham. Selina accepts as she realizes that her friend Bridgit may still be alive in Arkham but states that she will go alone. Gordon and Bullock visit Butch's (Drew Powell) mansion to talk with Tabitha (Jessica Lucas). Tabitha states that the sword Azrael used was fake and so, he will get the real one. The real sword lies in her grandfather's tomb.

They arrive at the Gotham cemetery where they retrieve the sword. Azrael arrives and attacks them, locking the cemetery while Gordon is outside. Tabitha tries to reason with Azrael, which causes him to remember everything, including that he has to kill Bruce Wayne. Azrael thanks her and then stabs her. Gordon is able to get a police car and warns Alfred (Sean Pertwee) about Galavan while Bruce returns to Wayne Manor. While Butch visits Tabitha in the hospital, Cobblepot (Robin Lord Taylor) arrives and proposes to him that they unite to kill Azrael in revenge for Cobblepot's mother's death and Tabitha's health state.

Selina infiltrates Arkham through the air ducts, where she runs into Nygma, who is trying to escape. He tells her how to get to Indian Hill so she can show him how to escape. Selina discovers the elevator that leads her to Indian Hill and overhears a conversation between Strange and Peabody (Tonya Pinkins) about Azrael. Azrael arrives at Wayne Manor and attacks Alfred. Bruce manages to knock Azrael down with a car, but he gets back up and prepares to kill Bruce. Before he can, Gordon arrives and shoots Azrael many times to no avail. When Azrael is about to kill Bruce, Gordon, and Alfred, Cobblepot arrives with Butch, who uses an AT4 anti-tank rocket to kill Azrael.

Nygma manages to escape Arkham Asylum through an air duct, but he is discovered by a guard and returned to Arkham. Selina discovers a training room where she finds burned dead bodies. Bridgit (Michelle Veintimilla) arrives in a new suit and flamethrower, revealing that she suffers from amnesia and that Strange sends her test subjects. Selina fails to reason with her and attempts to escape the room, which she discovers is locked. Bridgit is not fazed by Selina's attempts to remind her of her life, stating her name is "Firefly". Bridgit then fires the flamethrower towards Selina while Strange and Peabody watch.

== Production ==
=== Development ===
The twentieth episode of the season is titled "Unleashed", written by executive producer Danny Cannon, with Paul Edwards directing.

=== Casting ===
Morena Baccarin, Erin Richards, Chris Chalk, and Nicholas D'Agosto don't appear in the episode as their respective characters. The guest cast for the episode includes B. D. Wong as Professor Hugo Strange, Tonya Pinkins as Ethel Peabody and Michelle Veintimilla as Bridgit Pike.

== Reception ==
=== Viewers ===
The episode was watched by 3.67 million viewers with a 1.2/4 share among adults aged 18 to 49. This was a 2% increase in viewership from the previous episode, which was watched by 3.59 million viewers. With this ratings, Gotham ranked first for FOX, beating Houdini & Doyle, fourth on its timeslot and eight for the night on the 18-49 demographics, behind Blindspot, The Odd Couple, a rerun of The Big Bang Theory, two episodes of Mike & Molly, Dancing with the Stars and The Voice. In the United Kingdom, the episode premiered on May 30, 2016 and was watched by 1,220,000 viewers.

It was also the 30th most watched of the week in the 18-49 demographics and the 56th most watched overall in the week. With Live+7 DVR viewing factored in, the episode had an overall rating of 5.61 million viewers, and a 2.1 in the 18–49 demographic.

=== Critical reviews ===
Professional ratings
Review scores
Source	Rating
Rotten Tomatoes (Tomatometer)	83%
Rotten Tomatoes (Average Score)	7.1
IGN	7.2
The A.V. Club	C+
TV Fanatic	4.5/5.0 stars
TV Overmind	4.0/5.0 stars

"Wrath of the Villains: Unleashed" received positive reviews from critics. The episode received a rating of 83% with an average score of 7.1 out of 10 on the review aggregator Rotten Tomatoes.

Matt Fowler of IGN gave the episode a "good" 7.2 out of 10 and wrote in his verdict, "The Azrael arc may have ended with a glorious bang, but it was sloppy throughout. And shifting Azrael's killer gaze to Bruce, reigniting the whole 'Son of Gotham' plan, wasn't the greatest. There are only so many times we can watch Wayne Manor and the GCPD get attacked and invaded."

The A.V. Club's Kyle Fowle gave the episode a "C+" grade and wrote, "When Gotham aired its fall finale back in November, one of the biggest issues with the episode was that the crux of its dramatic tension was derived from the threat posed to Bruce Wayne by Theo Galavan. Galavan, up until that episode, had been a somewhat interesting character. His vision of total destruction in Gotham, aided by his run as Mayor of the city, brought a sense of clarity to a show that had often traded in case-of-the-week villains that boasted little staying power or genuine intrigue. Galavan felt different, like a person who could truly exploit the corrupt nature of Gotham's bureaucratic, political and criminal systems. Then, Galavan went after Bruce in the fall finale because of an ancient blood feud and everything went off the rails because, spoiler alert, Bruce Wayne isn’t going to die. It's a shame that Gotham chooses to go back to the well with Galavan and Bruce because Azrael is (was?) a promising character. Last week's episode positioned him as a rather unstoppable force, only to have him fall this week at the hands of Cobblepot, Butch, and their rocket launcher. The campy fun of Butch and Cobblepot showing up to save Gordon and kill Galavan aside, the story falls flat. It's actually baffling that Gotham feels the need to not only resurrect Galavan, but to then have him once again go after Bruce Wayne. 'Unleashed' is nearly the same in structure and tone to 'Rise Of The Villains: Worse Than A Crime,' meaning that the episode just feels like a coda that nobody wanted to a resolution we already received."

Andy Behbakht of TV Overmind gave the series a star rating of 4 out of 5, writing "Overall, 'Unleashed' was a really enjoyable episode that was quite intense and has that tone that makes you really feel that we are close to wrapping up the season."

Keertana Sastry of EW stated: "For the first few seconds of Monday night's episode of Gotham, it seemed for the first time in season 2 that Gordon, Bullock, and the GCPD had finally caught a break in their fight against the 'wrath of the villains' terrorizing the city. But as per usual, they are in way over their heads."

Lisa Babick from TV Fanatic, gave a 4.5 star rating out of 5.0, stating: "I still can't get over that Galavan ending. From the moment Jim's gun came up empty to Galavan being blown to smithereens was mind-blowing awesome. I think I could watch that scene over and over again and never get bored. I loved this episode, but I think the best is still to come!" The Baltimore Sun wrote positively about the episode, "In 'Unleashed,' we said goodbye to Gotham's worst mayor and most outdated villain with the help of one of Galavan/Azrael's countless enemies. The killer shouldn't come as a surprise to anyone who's been paying attention this season (hint: It was Penguin), but it was a satisfying, if not over-the-top, farewell for the show's most contemptible villain."

MaryAnn Sleasman of TV.com wrote positively about the episode, stating "My favorite part of 'Unleashed,' other than the unfortunate incident between Azrael and the boomlog, was that Jim Gordon was basically reduced to an afterthought and even Bruce remarked, at one point, 'I'm sick of trusting Detective Gordon!' Attaboy, Brucie. Maybe next time, Jimbo. You still have a few episodes to get it together."
