= Batman: Prey =

1990–91 DC Comics story arc

- Cover to Batman: Prey trade paperback, 1st printing, 1993. Art by Paul Gulacy and Terry Austin.
- Publisher: DC Comics
- Publication date: September 1990 – February 1991
- Genre: Superhero
- Title(s): Batman: Legends of the Dark Knight #11–15
- Main character(s): Batman; James Gordon; Hugo Strange; Catwoman

Creative team
- Writer: Doug Moench
- Artist(s): Paul Gulacy and Terry Austin
- Letterer: John Costanza
- Colorist: Steve Oliff
- Editor(s): Andy Helfer; Kevin Dooley; Bob Kahan (trade paperback)
- Batman: Prey: ISBN 0-446-39521-8

"Prey" is a Batman comic book story arc written by Doug Moench, with art by Paul Gulacy and Terry Austin. It was originally published in five parts by DC Comics from September 1990 through February 1991 for Legends of the Dark Knight, issues #11 through #15, and later compiled as a trade paperback.

== Publication history ==
"Batman: Prey" was part of the "Legends of the Dark Knight" series, which focused on telling stories about Batman's early years and adventures that were not part of the main continuity of the time but have since been integrated into Batman's expansive lore. The storyline was originally published over five issues, gaining significant acclaim for its storytelling and art.

== Plot synopsis ==
Prey is set during the early days of Batman's career as he is struggling to earn the trust of the public and form a working relationship with James Gordon, who is still just a police captain.

The main nemesis of the story is Hugo Strange, a brilliant psychiatrist who holds a professional stake and a personal obsession in unraveling Batman's secrets, including his true identity. He foments a smear campaign to paint Batman as a dangerous madman, which causes Batman to question his own sanity as well as the plausibility of his mission.

=== Part 1: Prey ===
Batman inadvertently disrupts a police operation, leading to tension with the force, especially Sergeant Max Cort. Amidst public debate over Batman's role in Gotham, Mayor Klass, with psychologist Dr. Hugo Strange's counsel, initiates a task force led by Captain James Gordon to capture Batman. Strange's obsession with Batman grows, culminating in his recruitment of Cort to a vigilante task force after deducing Batman's psychological profile and initiating a smear campaign against the vigilante.

=== Part 2: Dark Sides ===
Batman faces public scrutiny and internal doubt after a failed truce with Cort and escalating tensions. Professor Strange's manipulations deepen, driving a wedge between Batman and Gotham's citizens. Meanwhile, a new threat, Night Scourge, emerges, further complicating Batman's mission and casting shadow over his efforts to protect the city.

=== Part 3: Night Scourge! ===
Strange's manipulation of Cort turns more sinister, transforming him into Night Scourge. As Batman grapples with this new foe and Strange's escalating schemes, he must navigate a city that has turned against him, driven by fear and misinformation. The climax sees Batman confronting his own psychological demons, induced by Strange, and battling Cort/Night Scourge for the soul of Gotham .

=== Part 4: The Nightmare ===
Pursued by Gotham's police, Batman confronts Dr. Hugo Strange, suspecting his role in framing him. Strange attacks Batman with hallucinogenic gas, triggering a vivid reliving of his parents' deaths and causing him to flee disoriented. After surviving a perilous escape, Batman faces public hostility and personal torment, haunted by visions of his parents that challenge his resolve and identity as Batman.

=== Part 5: The Kill ===
Regaining his determination, Batman resolves to confront the orchestrators of Gotham's chaos. He exposes Strange's machinations in a calculated encounter, inadvertently leading to Strange being shot by police under the misapprehension he is Batman. Batman then confronts and defeats Max Cort, aka Night Scourge, with unexpected aid from Catwoman, culminating in Cort's demise at the hands of his own colleagues.

== Legacy ==
"Batman: Prey" has influenced subsequent portrayals of Hugo Strange and the thematic exploration of Batman's character. Its critical success has led to multiple reprints and its inclusion in various Batman anthologies. The storyline highlights a pivotal moment in Batman's career and the psychological battles that define him.
