= Batman: Arkham City =

2011 video game

- Developer: Rocksteady Studios (Note: Ported to Wii U by WB Games Montréal, PlayStation 4 and Xbox One by Virtuos and Nintendo Switch by Turn Me Up Games)
- Publisher: Warner Bros. Interactive Entertainment
- Director: Sefton Hill
- Producers: Daniel Bailie; Nathan Burlow
- Programmer: Ben Wyatt
- Artist: David Hego
- Writers: Paul Dini; Paul Crocker; Sefton Hill
- Composers: Nick Arundel; Ron Fish
- Series: Batman: Arkham
- Engine: Unreal Engine 3 (Note: Unreal Engine 4 was used for the PlayStation 4 and Xbox One version.)
- Platforms: PlayStation 3; Xbox 360; Windows; Wii U; OS X; PlayStation 4; Xbox One; Nintendo Switch
- Release: October 18, 2011: PlayStation 3, Xbox 360; NA: October 18, 2011; AU: October 19, 2011; EU: October 21, 2011 Windows; NA: November 22, 2011; AU: November 23, 2011; EU: November 25, 2011 Wii U; NA: November 18, 2012; PAL: November 30, 2012 OS X; WW: December 13, 2012 PlayStation 4, Xbox One; WW: October 18, 2016; Nintendo Switch; WW: December 1, 2023
- Genre: Action-adventure
- Mode: Single-player

Batman: Arkham City is a 2011 action-adventure game developed by Rocksteady Studios and published by Warner Bros. Interactive Entertainment. Based on the DC Comics superhero Batman, it is the sequel to the 2009 video game Batman: Arkham Asylum and the second installment in the Batman: Arkham series. Written by veteran Batman writer Paul Dini with Paul Crocker and Sefton Hill, Arkham City was inspired by the long-running comic book mythos. In the game's main storyline, Bruce Wayne is incarcerated in Arkham City, a super-prison enclosing the decaying urban slums of Gotham City. He dons his alter ego, Batman, and goes on a mission to uncover the secret behind a sinister scheme orchestrated by the facility's warden, Hugo Strange.

The game is presented from the third-person perspective with a primary focus on Batman's combat and stealth abilities, detective skills, and gadgets that can be used in both combat and exploration. Batman can freely move around the Arkham City prison, interacting with characters and undertaking missions, and unlocking new areas by progressing through the main story or obtaining new equipment. The player is able to complete side missions away from the main story to unlock additional content and collectible items. Batman's ally Catwoman is another playable character, featuring her own story campaign that runs parallel to the game's main plot.

Rocksteady conceived ideas for a sequel while developing Arkham Asylum, commencing serious development of Arkham City's story in February 2009. The layout of Arkham City has a virtual footprint five times that of Arkham Asylum, and the city design was modified to accommodate Batman's ability to swoop and glide. Over a year and $10 million were spent on the game's marketing campaign, and its release was accompanied by two music albums; one containing the game's score, and the other featuring 11 original songs inspired by the game from various mainstream artists.

Arkham City was released worldwide for the PlayStation 3 and Xbox 360 video game consoles in October 2011, followed by a Microsoft Windows version a month later. The game received critical acclaim, particularly for its narrative, characters, world design, soundtrack, and Batman's combat and navigation abilities. It was tied with The Elder Scrolls V: Skyrim for the highest-rated video game of 2011 according to review aggregator Metacritic, and was the recipient of several awards from media outlets, including Game of the Year, Best Action Game, Best Action Adventure Game, Best Adventure Game, and Best Original Score. Like its predecessor, it is considered one of the greatest video games ever made.

A spin-off mobile game, Batman: Arkham City Lockdown, was released in December. Arkham City received a "Game of the Year Edition" in May 2012. Wii U and OS X versions of the game were released in November and December 2012, respectively; and a remastered version for the PlayStation 4 and Xbox One in October 2016. A version for the Nintendo Switch was released in 2023. A prequel to the series, Batman: Arkham Origins, was released in October 2013, and a narrative sequel, Batman: Arkham Knight, was released in June 2015.

== Gameplay ==
Batman: Arkham City is an open world action-adventure game that incorporates tactics from stealth games. It is presented from the third-person perspective, showing the playable character on screen and allowing the camera to be freely rotated around it. The game is set within Arkham City, which is open to the player from the beginning of the game, allowing them to travel freely anywhere within its boundaries. The player can move silently throughout the game, using a combination of gadgets and stealth moves to sneak up on enemies and incapacitate them. Batman can use his cape to glide around the city, diving downwards and swooping upwards to extend his flight, and he can use the grapnel gun's retracting rope to attach to out-of-reach ledges. As Batman, the player is able to use "Detective Vision", a visual mode that highlights elements of interest on-screen, such as character status, collectables, and clues; the mode is also used to perform forensic activities such as tracking the source of a sniper rifle round. The player has access to an in-game criminal database which includes forensic puzzles, as well as a network for hacking communication frequencies.

Using an improved version of the "Freeflow" combat system from Arkham Asylum, the player can now counter multiple blows simultaneously, catch hurled projectiles, attack aerially, and administer a succession of consecutive strikes. Many of Batman's gadgets can now be used in combat. Enemies are armed with varying levels of armor and weapons; attacks from basic weapons like baseball bats and lead pipes inflict minor damage and can be countered, while guns inflict significant damage. Certain enemies must be disarmed in specific ways before they can be neutralized in combat: enemies with stun batons can only be attacked from behind; enemies with shields require aerial attacks to disarm; and enemies wearing body armor must be stunned with rapid successive strikes before they can be harmed. Larger enemies must be tackled with stuns and combo attacks, and can be manipulated to take out their allies. Disputes between gangs allied to rival villains often spark turf wars, which complicate the player's ability to move about Arkham City. Combat, among other actions, rewards the player with experience points that allow the player to periodically level Batman up and purchase upgrades to his Batsuit, gadgets, and combat and stealth skills. Each category contains approximately 15 different upgrades. For instance, an upgraded grapnel gun can be used to remotely disarm enemies, while a combat upgrade makes it easier to activate special attacks.

Batman defeats an enemy in a demonstration of Arkham City's "Freeflow" combat system.

Batman uses a Remote Electrical Charge against TYGER personnel. Batman: Arkham City features an emphasis on the skillful use of gadgetry when facing armed enemies.

Some gadgets obtained in Batman: Arkham Asylum are present at the start of Arkham City, while others become available during play. Most of these have improved or new capabilities; for example, the Cryptographic Sequencer, used for hacking security consoles, can also monitor shortwave radio channels, and the line launcher can now be deployed as a tightrope or alter direction during flight. Other items returning from the first game include these: a remote-controlled batarang; Explosive Gel that can now be detonated to knock down enemies in combat; and the grapnel gun, which can now be used while gliding to facilitate transportation. New items in Batman's arsenal include: smoke bombs that disorient opponents and assist with stealth tactics; a Remote Electric Charge (REC) gun that can stun enemies and temporarily power motors; Freeze Blast grenades that encase targets in ice and can be thrown into water to create makeshift platforms; and the Disruptor, which can remotely disable guns and explosive mines.

The game has approximately 40 hours of gameplay, with the main campaign lasting 25 hours and side missions lasting 15 hours. The side missions, which can be attempted at any time, feature prominent characters from the Batman universe. One such character, the Riddler, provides 440 optional "Riddler challenges" to solve. Most of these challenges consist of collecting trophies hidden in the city through the use of gadgets to disable traps and barriers. The player can mark Riddler trophies on the in-game map once found if they do not initially have the necessary equipment to complete the puzzle. The player can also reveal the locations of Riddler trophies on the map by identifying the Riddler's henchmen with "Detective Vision" and interrogating them, which requires the player to save the henchmen for last when engaging in combat with a wave of enemies. There are also environmental challenges which require the player to solve riddles by locating a specific item or location (which are rewarded with stories relating to the answer), and to locate question marks painted around the city, some of which can only be viewed in whole from certain vantage points. After completing a select number of challenges, Batman must rescue a civilian hostage held in one of the Riddler's death traps.

After completing the story mode on "normal" or "hard" difficulties, a "New Game Plus" mode is unlocked, enabling the player to replay the game with all of the gadgets, experience, and abilities that they have attained; enemies are tougher and the on-screen icon that warns players of imminent attacks is disabled. Arkham City features a series of challenge maps separate from the game's story mode. The maps focus on the completion of specific goals, such as eliminating successive waves of enemies in combat, subduing patrolling enemies while employing stealth, or traveling to a specific location as efficiently as possible. The methods and variety of abilities used to achieve these goals earn an overall performance score that is ranked online against other players.

Catwoman is another playable character available via the Catwoman campaign, which was initially downloadable content (DLC) on PlayStation 3 and Xbox 360 consoles but was later included with the Windows version and the "Game of the Year Edition". Catwoman's campaign features her own heist-focused storyline that intersects with the main story at specific points in the game. Her combat emphasizes agility and allows for the use of unique weapons such as clawed gauntlets, bolas, and her iconic whip. A portion of the Riddler challenges are specific to Catwoman and can only be completed by her. Batman's allies Robin (Tim Drake) and Nightwing (Dick Grayson) are also playable via optional DLC and feature their own combat abilities and gadgets. Both characters are available in the challenge maps; Robin has his own main story narrative.

The PlayStation 3 and Xbox 360 versions of Arkham City include a stereoscopic 3D (S3D) mode for 3D HDTVs and for 2D HDTVs via Inficolor 3D glasses, while the PC version supports Nvidia 3D Vision on compatible monitors. It uses TriOviz for Games Technology, which is integrated with Unreal Engine 3. The Wii U version uses the Wii U's touch screen controller to let the player manage Batman's equipment and upgrades, selectively detonate Explosive Gel placements, and view a map of the city. The Wii U version adds a Sonar mode which highlights points of interest nearby, and the Battle Armored Tech Mode (BAT Mode) that allows Batman to accrue energy during combat and, when activated, inflict increased damage.

== Synopsis ==
=== Characters ===
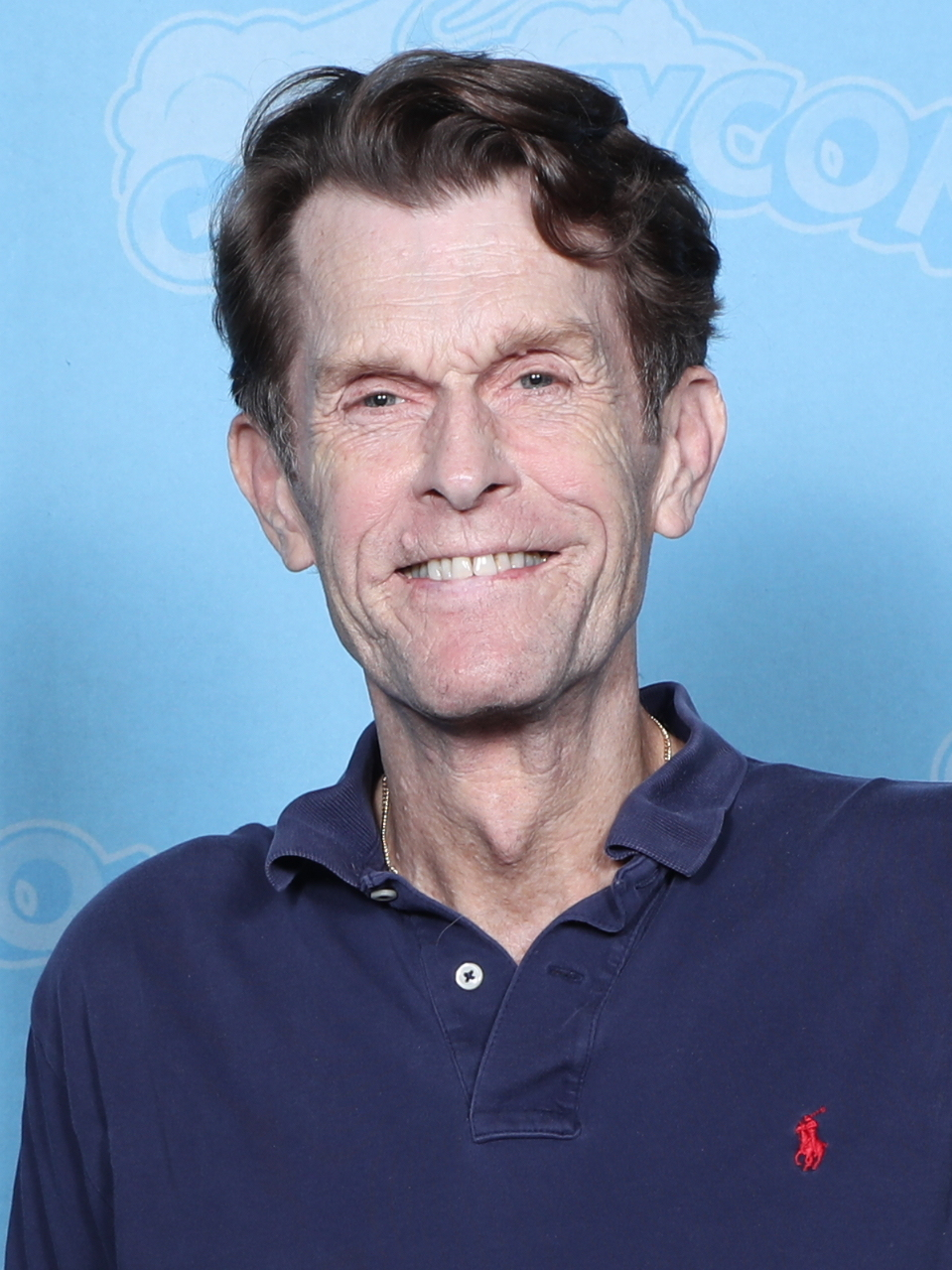
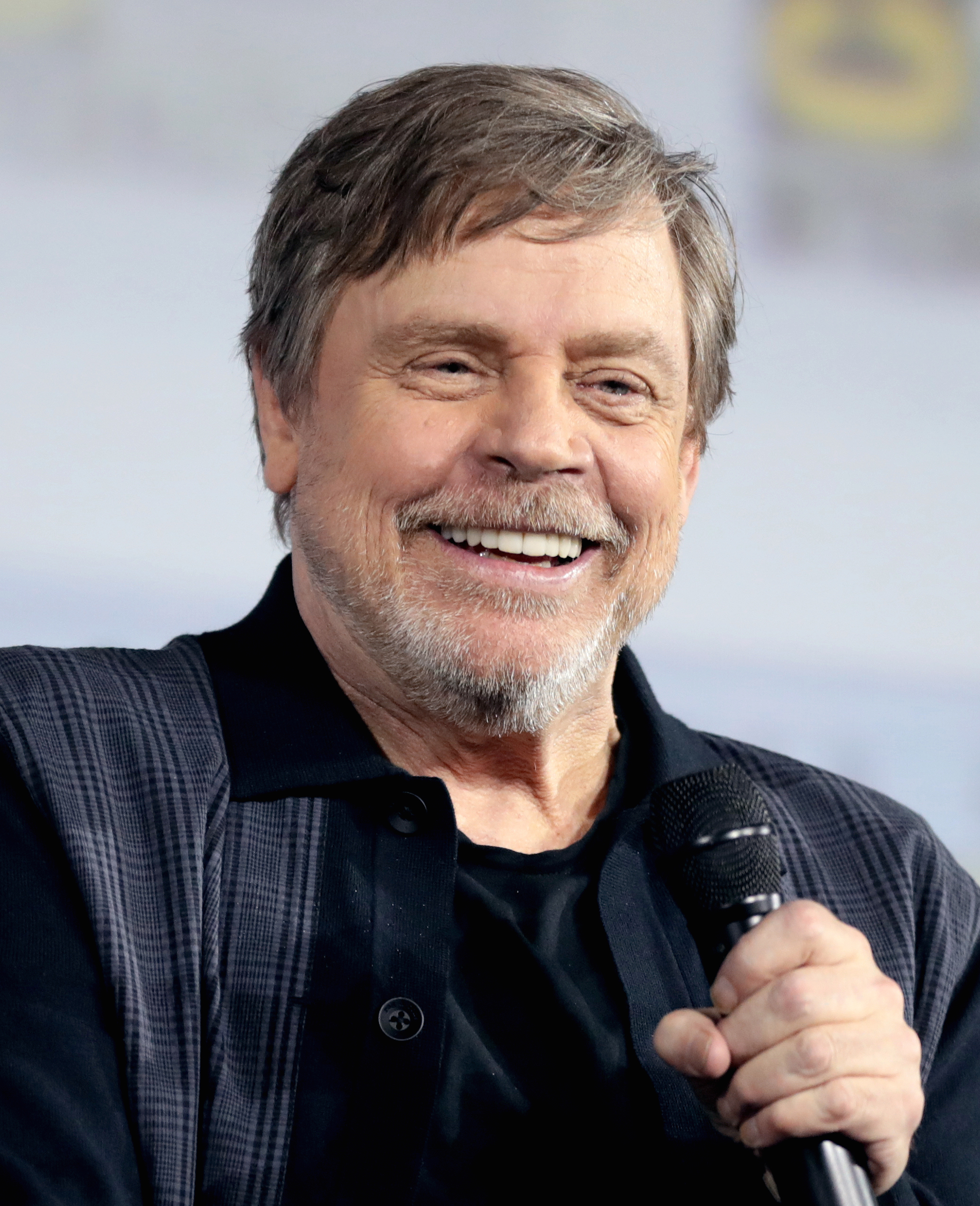
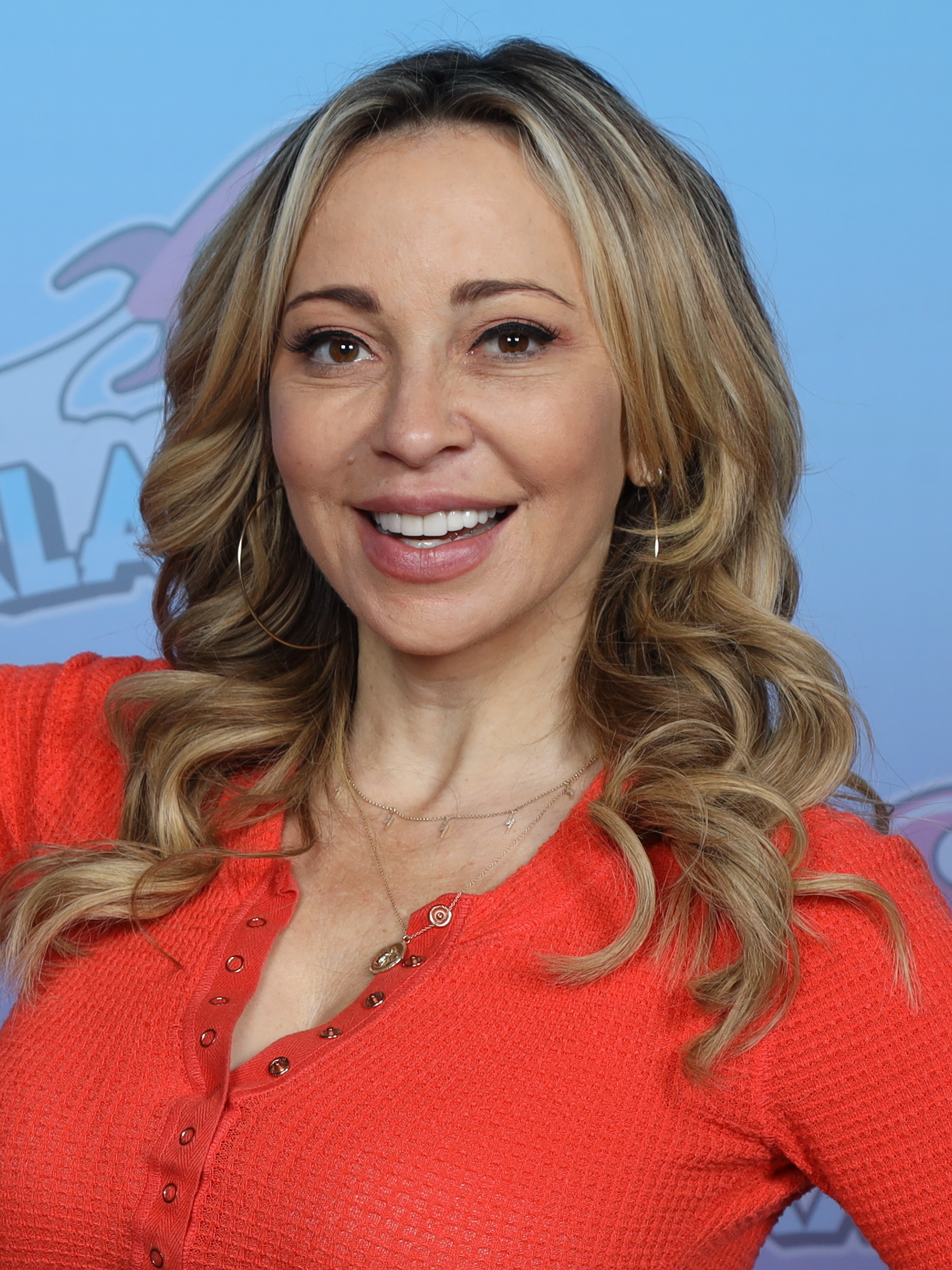
Kevin Conroy returned as Batman from Arkham Asylum. Actor Mark Hamill was reluctant to return as the Joker for the sequel, wanting to leave the role on a "high note", but relented after learning of the involvement of Paul Dini and Conroy. Actress Tara Strong replaced Arleen Sorkin in Batman: Arkham City as the voice of Harley Quinn, and reprised the role for the Harley Quinn's Revenge downloadable content.

Arkham City features a large ensemble cast of characters from the history of Batman comics. Returning characters from Arkham Asylum include Batman (Kevin Conroy), the Joker (Mark Hamill)—in what Hamill stated would be his final time voicing the character; (he subsequently reprised the role in Arkham City's successor Batman: Arkham Knight)—Warden-turned-Mayor Quincy Sharp (Tom Kane), police Commissioner James Gordon (David Kaye), and reporter Jack Ryder (James Horan). Returning villains include the Riddler (Wally Wingert), Victor Zsasz (Danny Jacobs), Bane (Fred Tatasciore), and Poison Ivy (Tasia Valenza). Joker's sidekick Harley Quinn also returns, voiced by Tara Strong, who replaces Arleen Sorkin. Batman's supporting cast introduces Catwoman (Grey DeLisle), Robin (Troy Baker), and Batman's butler Alfred Pennyworth (Martin Jarvis), who provides radio support alongside the returning Oracle (Kimberly Brooks). Nightwing appears as a playable character outside of the main story via challenge maps.

Other characters marking their debut in the series include the manipulative warden of Arkham City, Hugo Strange (Corey Burton), Two-Face (also voiced by Baker), and the Penguin (Nolan North). Stana Katic lends her voice as Talia al Ghul, and Maurice LaMarche voices both Mr. Freeze and Calendar Man. Other characters include the zombie Solomon Grundy (also voiced by Tatasciore), the shapeshifter Clayface (Rick D. Wasserman), the League of Assassins's leader, Ra's al Ghul (Dee Bradley Baker), the mind-controlling Mad Hatter (Peter MacNicol), and the assassin Deadshot (Chris Cox), who has infiltrated Arkham City to kill several high-profile character targets. The villain Hush (also voiced by Conroy), the mysterious Azrael (Khary Payton), and reporter Vicki Vale (also voiced by DeLisle) also appear. Black Mask (also voiced by North), Killer Croc (Steve Blum), and Freeze's wife, Nora Fries, make cameo appearances in the game.

=== Setting ===
The events of Arkham City are set 18 months after Batman: Arkham Asylum. Quincy Sharp, the asylum's erstwhile director, has taken credit for halting the Joker's armed siege, using this distinction to become mayor of Gotham City. Declaring both the asylum and Blackgate Penitentiary no longer suitable to contain the city's detainees, Sharp's administration orders both facilities closed, and he purchases Gotham's most notorious slums and turns them into an immense prison enclosure known as Arkham City. This facility is subsequently placed in the care of psychiatrist Hugo Strange—who is secretly manipulating Sharp—and monitored by a rogue private military firm, TYGER Security. Strange permits the inmates to do as they please, so long as they do not attempt to escape. A wary Batman maintains his own vigil over the new project, afraid that the chaotic situation there will get out of hand. Meanwhile, the Joker is dying from a disease caused by his previous overdose of the Titan formula, an unstable steroid mutagen that turns men into powerful and savage monsters.

=== Plot ===
At a press conference held by Bruce Wayne to declare his opposition to Arkham City, TYGER mercenaries arrest and imprison him in the City itself. Hugo Strange discloses his knowledge of Wayne's dual identity as Batman before releasing him into the prison's criminal populace. While Strange prepares to commence "Protocol 10", Wayne obtains his equipment via airdrop from Alfred Pennyworth, allowing him to become Batman. He first saves Catwoman from being executed by Two-Face, who hopes to gain respect by murdering her. After the Joker attempts to assassinate Catwoman, Batman tracks him to his hideout in the Sionis Steelmill, believing Joker may know the truth behind Protocol 10.

There, Batman learns that the unstable properties of the Titan formula are mutating in Joker's blood, gradually killing him. Joker captures Batman and performs a blood transfusion on him, infecting him with the same fatal disease. Joker also reveals that Gotham hospitals have been poisoned with his infected blood. Desperate to save himself and innocent citizens, Batman seeks out Mr. Freeze, who has been developing a cure but has since been kidnapped by the Penguin. Tracking Penguin to his fortified museum, Batman defeats his forces, his imprisoned monster Solomon Grundy, and ultimately the Penguin himself, before liberating Mr. Freeze.

Freeze tells Batman that he has created a cure, but it is rendered useless via instability. Batman deduces that the therapeutic properties of Ra's al Ghul's blood can complete the cure and tracks one of his assassins to his underground lair, leading Batman into a confrontation with Ra's and his daughter Talia, Batman's former lover. With Ra's al Ghul's blood, Freeze is able to develop an antidote, but Harley Quinn steals it before Batman can use it.

When Batman returns to the Joker, he finds the latter's health has been restored. During a fight between the two, Strange activates Protocol 10, which is revealed to be a scheme to wipe out the entire population of Arkham City and destroy the criminal element of Gotham. TYGER troops begin executing inmates as Strange launches missile strikes on Arkham's denizens from his base in Wonder Tower. A missile hits the steel mill, burying Batman under rubble. Before Joker can take advantage of the situation, Talia arrives and offers him immortality in exchange for sparing Batman's life. After escaping with the help of Catwoman, Batman is convinced by Alfred to end Protocol 10 before pursuing Talia and Joker.

Batman infiltrates Wonder Tower and disables Protocol 10. Ra's al Ghul is revealed to be the true mastermind behind Arkham City and mortally wounds Strange for failing to defeat Batman. With his dying breath, Strange activates "Protocol 11", the self-destruction of Wonder Tower. After Ra's commits suicide to avoid capture, Joker contacts Batman, threatening to kill Talia unless Batman meets him at the Monarch Theater. When Batman arrives, Joker demands the cure from Batman but is impaled and seemingly killed by Talia while distracted. Talia admits to stealing the antidote from Quinn, before a second Joker kills her, still stricken with the disease.

The healthy Joker that Talia impaled then reanimates into the shapeshifting Clayface, who is revealed to have been masquerading as a healthy Joker all along at the ailing villain's request. During Batman's battle with Clayface, Joker blows up the theater floor, revealing that it is above the Lazarus Pit. After defeating Clayface, Batman drinks a portion of the antidote and destroys Ra's' rejuvenating Lazarus Pit before Joker can use it. As Batman debates curing his foe, Joker attacks him, inadvertently causing the antidote vial to smash. Batman admits that he would have saved him despite everything Joker had done. Joker finally succumbs to his illness and dies. Batman carries and places Joker's body on the hood of Commissioner Gordon's car before leaving Arkham City in silence.

== Development ==
=== Concept ===
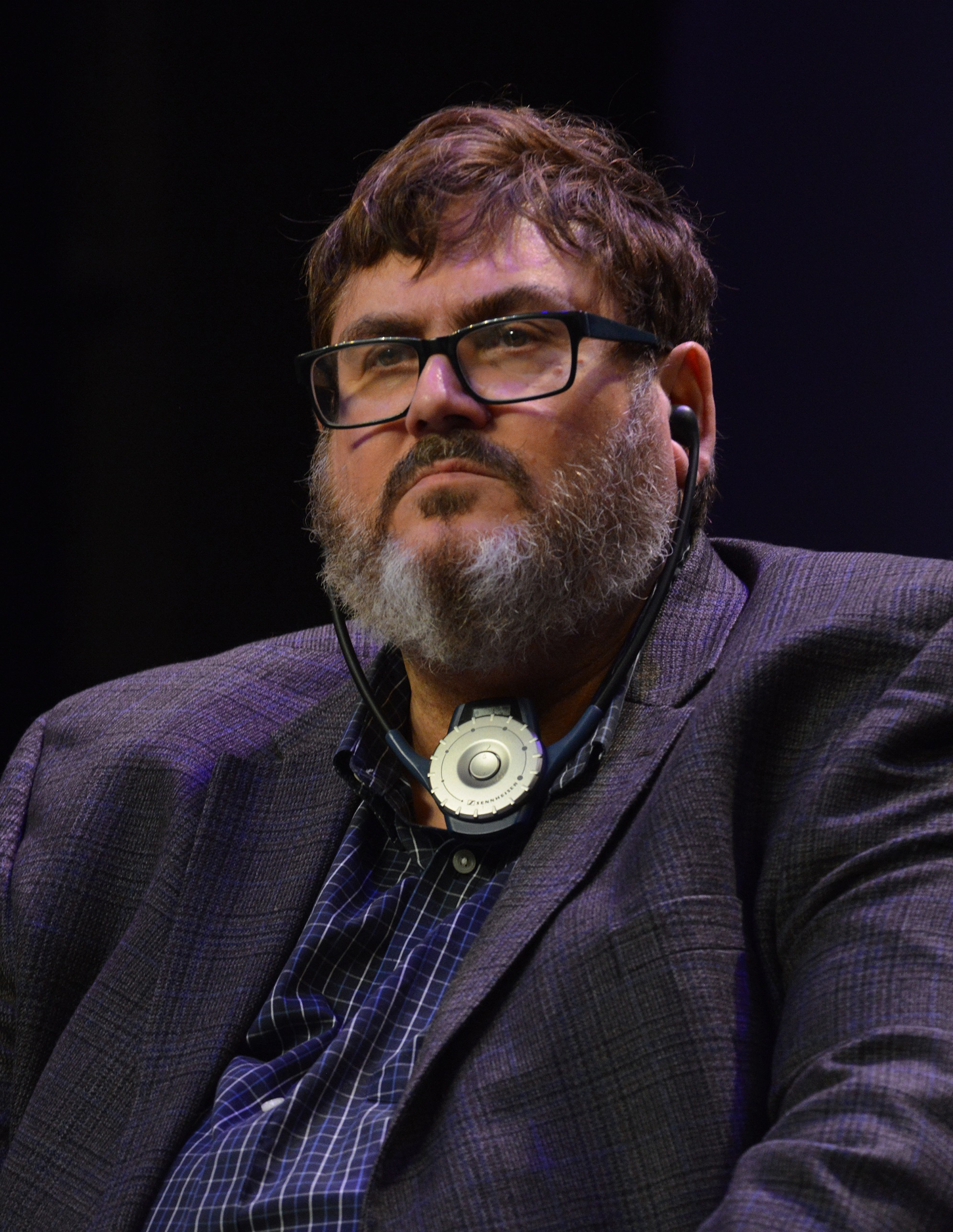
Veteran Batman comic book writer Paul Dini, pictured in 2019. After writing Arkham Asylum, Dini reprised his duties for Arkham City.

Rocksteady conceived the idea of a sequel before development of Arkham Asylum had concluded, developing ideas for both the story and setting so the games' narratives could be effectively connected; a secret room was hidden in the asylum warden's office in Arkham Asylum containing hints of how the sequel would progress, including blueprints for the Arkham City prison; the blueprints are quite similar to its final layout in Arkham City. The original idea was to take the game out of the asylum setting and onto the streets of Gotham City while retaining the level of design detail put into the asylum. To that end they wanted to include locations from the Batman mythos that were notable and meaningful to the character, instead of a series of generic streets; Rocksteady was initially unsure how technical considerations would limit the scope of this idea.

Serious development of the game's story and concept started in February 2009, as teams were moved from Arkham Asylum to Arkham City's development as they completed the work on that game. By the time they had programmed Batman to dive and glide between buildings of the asylum, the adaption of the gameplay to the city was considered natural. Rocksteady decided to not include the Batmobile, because it would be unable to travel on the city's broken terrain. Batman's gliding provided a sufficient means of transportation, and it was considered that putting Batman in any vehicle would make it a completely different game. Sefton Hill, Arkham City's director from Rocksteady Studios, stated that a key goal for the game was to deliver the "'Batman in Gotham' feeling." The sequel was described by Conroy as "really, really dark". While relating the game's dark nature to the animated movie Batman Beyond: Return of the Joker, Conroy also said, "It involves a lot of the villains and it goes to that area – it's that dark."

=== Design ===
As part of the "Batman in Gotham" design philosophy, Batman's arsenal of moves and actions were expanded. Although the team developed several ideas for new moves, gadgets and abilities, they only went forward with those that they felt would be authentic to Batman. They also chose to have Batman start the game with access to the gadgets unlocked in Arkham Asylum, to convey the impression that Batman is fully prepared for the inevitability of things going wrong in Arkham City. The studio reviewed the play and combat systems used in Arkham Asylum, and built the new moves as natural extensions of the existing system as a means to "add even more depth and gameplay instead of changing them fundamentally". The number of animations were doubled to reflect the larger arsenal of moves at the player's disposal. The X-ray-like "Detective Vision" mode used to highlight certain objects in-game was redeveloped for Arkham City because it was considered to be too useful in Arkham Asylum, resulting in some players using it throughout almost the entire game; the visual effect also obscured the game's design aesthetic. One idea was to introduce a time limit on its use, but it was considered that Batman "wouldn't make a gadget like that". Instead, the mode was designed to be difficult to use in certain situations such as obscuring navigational information, and combat where enemy strikes will blur the screen when "Detective Vision" is active. Rocksteady art director David Hego described the new "Detective Vision" as an "augmented reality mode".

Another way the developers wished to enhance the player's Batman experience was through the larger game world. Arkham City has a virtual footprint five times larger than that of Arkham Asylum, and the navigational aspects were improved to offer the player "the freedom and exhilaration of gliding down alleyways and soaring above the skyline". Though the concepts were compared to an open world game, Hill notes that such freeform nature would not be appropriate for a Batman game because it would inhibit the atmosphere they wanted to create, and that Arkham City was designed to challenge the player to think like Batman to survive. To counterbalance the larger game world, the developers also sought to include more challenges and side missions while keeping the player alert as to the primary mission, such that the players constantly are aware of "extreme pressure of the challenges that they face". The Riddler Trophies were designed towards the end of the game's development and were incorporated into every area of the map without overpopulating it, resulting in 440 trophies. Rocksteady aimed to make the player think creatively when collecting trophies by requiring the use of gadgets to solve puzzles, rather than placing the trophies in obscure areas of the map as mere collection items.

With the open game world, Rocksteady included more villains to create challenges for Batman. Hugo Strange was selected as a primary antagonist, as his power and controlling manner help maintain the lockdown on Arkham City once Batman enters. Strange is aware of Batman's true identity, making Batman "vulnerable and exposed in a way that he has never been before", according to Hill. He noted that Strange is a character new to many players but that his backstory and character are detailed throughout the game. Catwoman was also included based on her long history with Batman, though she was given her own agenda running parallel to the events within Arkham City. Catwoman's missions initially ended with her coming to Batman's aide, but late in development, the developers decided to give the player an alternate choice, allowing them to have the morally grey Catwoman leave the city with her loot; the addition was implemented in two days. Batman's sidekick Robin also appears, featuring a shaved head and contemporary costume design that were intended to move away from his traditional "Boy Wonder" image. Senior concept artist Kan Muftic explained: "Our vision of Robin is the one of a troubled young individual that is calm and introverted at times, but very dangerous and aggressive if provoked. The shaved head is inspired by cage fighters, because we thought that Robin might be doing that in his spare time to keep him on his toes. Still, we kept all the classic trademarks of Robin's appearance, such as the red and yellow colors of his outfit, the cape and the mask." Rocksteady originally did not plan to include Robin in the main story but later decided to as an authentic means of delivering new gadgets to Batman, as well as to introduce their version of the character and his relationship with Batman.

Rocksteady intended for Batman, Catwoman, and Robin to offer three different playing experiences. Other villains from Batman's comic history were selected to show that the prison was a melting pot of people from Gotham. The developers believed that providing a small part of each villain's story rather than focusing on a select few allowed the player to meet many more characters and effectively conveyed the feeling of being in a superprison filled with supervillains. Rocksteady decided early on that the Joker would die in the story, and developed the idea of him poisoning Batman with the same affliction, in order to show how the two diametrically opposed characters would interact in pursuit of a shared goal. Warner Bros. and Dini did not oppose killing off the character as long as it was not done for shock value, and as long as they made it clear that Batman was not at fault, since he would not intentionally kill someone.

The developers had considered adding a multiplayer element to the game, but ultimately decided against it. About the agreement, Hill stated, "If we use all of the energy that is required to create multiplayer and instead focus this on the single player, would that deliver a better overall game?"

Variety was added to the city itself, as certain areas were designed around the villains that control that particular territory. Dax Ginn, marketing game manager at Rocksteady Games, said, "If you move into Joker's territory, you get a very Joker-ized experience, and all the artwork on the buildings – whether that's graffiti, signage, or whatever it might be – gives you a dense kind of Joker experience. So our art team has really put a lot of effort in making that sort of transition between one turf zone to another – really helping the player feel like they're making a physical transition into another emotional space." The architecture was imbued with 19th century Art Nouveau design, such as Strange's Wonder Tower which was inspired by the Eiffel Tower, while character designs employed a modern hyperrealism style. To keep the environments interesting, base color schemes such as Mr Freeze's ice-themed area, Joker's fire-themed steel mill, and Poison Ivy's jungle-themed area were populated with contrasting elements: for example, the steel mill uses large, white clown faces to contrast the oranges and reds used throughout. To develop the expanded environment of Arkham City and build a "natural urban environment" for Batman, Rocksteady expanded its workforce from 75 to over 100 people. The crunch period for Arkham City lasted about eight months, with people working until 11 or 12 each night, with an 8am start.

=== Music ===
The game's release was accompanied by two albums of music released by WaterTower Music. Batman: Arkham City – Original Video Game Score was released on October 18, 2011, and features 19 tracks written for the game by Arkham Asylum composers Nick Arundel and Ron Fish. Batman: Arkham City – The Album was released on October 4, 2011, via CD and digital download. The album contains 11 original songs inspired by the game from mainstream artists including Daughtry, Panic! at the Disco, and Coheed and Cambria. An extra song was made available via the Collector's edition of the album, and the Deluxe edition included a portion of Arundel's original score.

== Marketing ==
Arkham City's marketing campaign was designed to reach an audience outside of superhero fans and appeal to consumers who are attracted to games like the first-person shooter series Call of Duty. Warner Bros.'s marketing team decided that Batman's status as a cultural icon and superhero was unavoidable, so they decided to emphasize other elements of the character that could appeal to fans of first-person shooters and action games. Black-and-white photographs of iconic personalities like inventor Steve Jobs and actor James Dean served as inspiration and a basis for the final marketing campaign used in advertisements and the game's cover art. The imagery, highlighted with blood and bathed in light was considered to move away from the classic superhero image and refocus on Batman's humanity. The black and white campaign was featured on 120 magazine covers and was targeted towards approximately 15 million consumers across a variety of social media and Warner Bros. products, in addition to a series of viral marketing videos and stunts involving actors in costume attending press-related events. By April 2012, three gameplay trailers had gained approximately 6 million views. The viral segment of the campaign involved several audio recordings between characters from the game including Hugo Strange, Quincy Sharp, Riddler, and the Penguin; each recording could be found by solving a puzzle. The entire campaign spent more than a year in development, producing artwork, videos, DLC, printed advertisements, billboards, and events, and was estimated to have cost at least $10 million.

A five-issue, limited monthly comic series, also titled Batman: Arkham City was released on May 11, 2011. The series bridges the plot between Arkham Asylum and Arkham City. It was written by Paul Dini with art by Carlos D'Anda. Warner Bros. also developed toys based on the characters through Mattel, Hallmark cards, batarang-shaped videogame controllers, and a variety of apparel by Converse, Eckō Complex, C Life, New Era, and Briefly Stated.

Toys "R" Us in Times Square New York City, released 500 copies of Batman: Arkham City on Monday, October 17, one day before the game officially hit shelves. The first 100 customers to pre-order a copy through the store's "Personal Shopping Department" had a chance to get their game autographed by DC Entertainment co-publisher Jim Lee, Batman voice actor Kevin Conroy, and Arkham City game director Sefton Hill. The remaining 400 copies of Arkham City could be purchased at the event, unautographed.

== Release ==
Batman: Arkham City was released in North America on October 18, 2011, for Xbox 360 and PlayStation 3, followed on October 19 in Australia and October 21 in Europe. Australian retailers EB Games and Game broke the official release date two days early, selling the game on October 17. The Windows version had been scheduled for simultaneous release with other versions, but in September 2011, its release was pushed back to November 18 without explanation. Alongside its PC launch, the game was also released digitally on the OnLive, Origin, and Steam platforms. A "Game of the Year Edition" was released on May 29, 2012, in the United States and Canada, and on September 7, 2012, in Europe, Australia, and other territories on PlayStation 3 and Xbox 360, except the United Kingdom where its scheduled release was pushed back to November 2, 2012.

A spin-off game titled Batman: Arkham City Lockdown was developed by NetherRealm Studios for iOS and was released on December 7, 2011. Taking place before Arkham City, the game sees players using touchscreen controls to fight enemies one-on-one, including villains such as Two-Face, Solomon Grundy, Joker, and the mercenary Deathstroke. Defeating enemies earns points that can be used to upgrade Batman's stats or unlock gadgets or costumes.

=== Pre-order bonuses ===
Warner Bros. partnered with several retailers and companies globally to provide bonus content as a reward for pre-ordering, including: Best Buy, Amazon.com, GameStop, Game, Gamestation, EB Games, Tesco, and Asda. The content was only made available by pre-ordering the game with a specific retailer or purchasing a product, such as a NOS beverage, to obtain an unlockable code.

A variety of alternate outfits for Batman were revealed in August 2011, including suit designs worn by the character in The Dark Knight Returns, Batman: Earth One, the Bronze Age of Comics, Batman: The Animated Series, and Batman Beyond. The Batman: The Animated Series skin was initially only available to GameStop customers in the U.S. with a Power-Up Rewards Membership. A PlayStation 3-exclusive Sinestro Corps outfit was revealed in August 2011 that initially was only unlockable via a unique code obtained by purchasing the extended cut edition of the Warner Bros. film, Green Lantern on Blu-ray Disc.

Batman's sidekick Robin (Tim Drake) was made available as a playable character for use in challenge maps, with his own set of combat moves and gadgets. Additional Robin skins were also released, including his appearance from Batman: The Animated Series and the Red Robin outfit. The character came with two exclusive challenge maps: "Black Mask Hideout" and "Freight Train Escape". The "Joker's Carnival" challenge map was also made available; it set within the Joker's Sionis Steel Mill base where the player is faced with multiple waves of opponents. The pre-order content was considered an "early access opportunity" for customers, with Ginn confirming that all of the content would be made available for download after the game's release date. Pre-orders for Arkham City numbered more than 200% above those of Arkham Asylum.

=== Retail editions ===
In the United Kingdom, the "Robin Edition" was announced, available exclusively through retailers Game and Gamestation, containing the game and all of the Robin pre-order content including the playable character, skins and challenge maps. A series of "Steelbook Edition" versions of the game were also made available, featuring the standard game with a metallic case. The Joker-themed Steelbook includes the "Joker's Carnival" challenge map, the animated film Batman: Under the Red Hood on DVD (Blu-ray for PlayStation 3), and the Bronze Age Batman skin DLC. Three other villain-themed steelbook cases were also offered, featuring the likenesses of Two-Face and the Penguin. A fourth steelbook featuring Catwoman was released, containing the Batman: Earth One alternative skin for Batman.

The "Collector's Edition" contains a Batman statue by Kotobukiya, a collectible art book, Batman: Arkham City – The Album from WaterTower Music, the animated film Batman: Gotham Knight, The Dark Knight Returns skin and the Penguin-themed "Iceberg Lounge" challenge map. In July 2011, the Microsoft Windows version of the game was revealed to use Games for Windows – Live (GFWL) to access online services. Confusion concerning the use of GFWL was raised when a distributor was told by Warner Bros. that the title did not use the Live system, but the use of GFWL was confirmed in late August. However, the game and its sequel has been removed from GFWL and SecuROM on October 17, 2013. The save game will not continue unless it is started from the beginning. Therefore, when buying a retail version, the system clock must be changed before activating the game.

On October 25, 2011, a Batman-themed Xbox 360 console bundle was released, containing the game, a DVD of Batman: Gotham Knight, a DVD of the Green Lantern film, the Green Lantern video game tie-in Rise of the Manhunters, and a 250GB Xbox 360 console. A bundle containing these items and a Kinect controller was also released.

A "Game of the Year Edition" was announced on April 23, 2012, containing the game and all of the released downloadable content (DLC). A free download of the animated movie Batman: Year One was also included with versions released in the United States and Canada. The cover art was widely criticized for its large text of review scores and quotations, which dwarfed the actual name of the game. Some critics claimed it to be among the worst ever. The "Game of the Year Edition" was developed for OS X by Feral Interactive and released on December 13, 2012.

=== Downloadable content ===
New purchases of the game for Xbox 360 and PlayStation 3 are provided with a unique code that unlocks the Catwoman DLC, enabling a series of missions for Catwoman, with unique weapons and moves. Although the missions were presented as part of the main game, on October 13, 2011, Warner Bros. announced that it would be restricted to new purchases. Users can also purchase the content separately. It was later announced that pre-owned copies purchased from GameStop would contain the necessary unlock code. A Warner Bros. rep confirmed that playing as Catwoman would not be required to complete the game. The Catwoman DLC also contains two alternate skins for the character: her appearances from The Animated Series and Batman: The Long Halloween. The PC version of the game includes the DLC, requiring no downloads or further installs to access.

Additional DLC packs were later released. The Nightwing pack, released on November 1, 2011, includes Batman's ally Nightwing as a playable character for the game's challenge maps, an Animated Series alternative skin for the character, and two more challenge maps: "Wayne Manor" and "Main Hall". The Robin pack was released on November 22, 2011, and contains the Robin pre-order content. A Skins pack containing all of the alternate Batman pre-order skins was released on December 6, 2011. Another pack was announced for release on December 20, 2011, containing the pre-order "Iceberg Lounge" and "Joker's Carnival" challenge maps, and a completely new challenge map: "Batcave". On December 19, 2011, a new Batman skin was released—based on the character's outfit from Batman Incorporated—to download for free on all platforms.

On October 23, 2011, an official map app was made available to purchase on the iOS App Store that contains maps for Arkham City, the locations of in-game collectibles, and the solutions to the Riddler's riddles.

Harley Quinn's Revenge, a story-based campaign expansion, was released on May 29, 2012, for the PlayStation 3 and the Xbox 360, with a PC version coming out a week later. The campaign features a new story, new areas, new enemies, and both Batman and Robin as playable characters. The story takes place two weeks after the events of Arkham City. The mega prison has since been evacuated, but Quinn returns and sets up in Joker's former base. The game follows Robin's search for Batman, who has gone missing while hunting Quinn; Batman has been acting differently following the end of the main game story, concerning his allies. On the same day, it was announced that all of the released DLC, including Harley Quinn's Revenge, would be made available as part of the Arkham City "Game of the Year Edition".

=== Other releases ===
The Wii U release of Arkham City, titled Batman: Arkham City - Armored Edition, was developed by WB Games Montréal and released on November 18, 2012, alongside the console's launch in North America. The release contains all of the available content from previous releases — plus a Battle Armored Tech mode, GamePad support, and other additions.

Batman: Return to Arkham, developed by Virtuos, is a compilation featuring remastered versions of Arkham Asylum and Arkham City using Unreal Engine 4 for the PlayStation 4 and Xbox One. Additionally, both games include all previously released downloadable content, and features improved graphics, upgraded models and environments, and improvements in the lighting, effects and shaders for both games. Originally intended for release in North America on July 26, 2016, and in Europe on July 29, 2016, the compilation was delayed indefinitely in June 2016 in order to give the development team "additional time to deliver a polished Batman Arkham game experience." It was released on October 18, 2016.

Batman: Arkham Trilogy, developed by Turn Me Up, features ports of Arkham Asylum, Arkham City, and Batman: Arkham Knight for the Nintendo Switch that was launched on December 1, 2023. The versions of Arkham Asylum and Arkham City in this compilation are not based on the Return to Arkham releases but instead the original Unreal Engine 3-based releases.

== Reception ==
=== Critical reception ===
Reception

Aggregate score
Aggregator	Score
Metacritic	96/100 (PS3); 94/100 (X360); 91/100 (PC); 85/100 (Wii U)

Review scores
Publication	Score
1Up.com	A
Electronic Gaming Monthly	10/10
Eurogamer	9/10
Game Informer	10/10
GamePro	5/5
GameSpot	9/10
IGN	9.5/10
Joystiq	4.5/5
PlayStation Official Magazine – UK	10/10
Official Xbox Magazine (US)	10/10
X-Play	5/5

Batman: Arkham City received critical acclaim. According to review aggregating website Metacritic, the PlayStation 3 version of the game had a weighted average review score of 96/100, the Xbox 360 version had 94/100, and the PC version had 91/100.

Game Informer's Andrew Reiner awarded the game a perfect 10 score, labeling it "the best licensed video game ever made". Reiner said that the game could be the biggest and "most enjoyable timesink" of 2011, and concluded that the game surpassed every standard set by Batman: Arkham Asylum "in every way and stands tall as one of Batman's greatest moments." Joystiq's Griffin McElroy praised the attention to detail, and mechanical excellence of the game environment, crediting Rocksteady for "breathing life into a staggeringly beautiful world; one which hums not only with opportunity, but ambition". McElroy criticized the game narrative as a series of excuses to encounter villains that were "one-dimensional punching [bags]", and that the character dialogue was clichéd. McElroy was also critical of the Riddler challenges, stating that they were "frustrating" when the player lacks the necessary items to complete them.

Eurogamer's Christian Donlan considered that the game lacked the same "surprise" as its predecessor, but praised the overall improvement of bosses, animations and the scope of activities available. Donlan said that the game environment was intricate and very detailed, and the abilities provided for its traversal made it "hard not to feel like the world's greatest detective, on patrol". IGN's Greg Miller said "the voice acting, the challenges, the amazing opening, the unbelievable ending and the feeling of being the Dark Knight—these are the things that standout". Miller said that the Catwoman missions were a fun change of pace from the main gameplay, and that he "adored" the option to replay the game with unlocked abilities and more difficult enemies.

The Daily Telegraph's Tom Hoggins praised the game's sense of progress in discovering and mastering the character abilities, and the "show-stopping brutality" of the improved combat system. Hoggins highlighted the Catwoman campaign as a "delight" and fitting lithe contrast to Batman's strength, but lamented the campaign's short length. The Guardian's Nick Cowen labeled it the best Batman game of all time, praising the variety of side missions and content, the large cast of iconic characters, and the satisfying challenge of the Riddler missions. The Australian Official PlayStation Magazine awarded a perfect score of 10 stating that the game "is not only the best superhero game ever made, it's one of the best games ever made... it brings the Caped Crusader's world to life better than any comic, movie or television show before it". Play3 (Germany) awarded a score of 92%, calling it "the best superhero game ever made". GamesMaster awarded a score of 97%, saying it is "the gold standard by which all future videogames should be judged".

Batman: Arkham City – Armored Edition for Wii U received a positive reception. Metacritic provided a score of 85/100. Eurogamer's Richard Leadbetter was critical of technical performance including issues with visual quality and inconsistent framerate. EGM's Ray Carsillo said that the optional B.A.T. system made certain battles too easy. Carsillo also said it was the "clearly inferior version" of the game due to glitches and "tacked on gimmicks". Nintendo World Report's Patrick Barnett wrote that certain uses of the Wii U controller made it "the best way to experience Arkham City", but that some new features were a "nuisance". Barnett added that it was "on par, if not better, visually", than its counterparts. Joystiq's JC Fletcher opined that the persistent map screen and touch screen interface were appreciated, and complimented the use of augmented reality to explore crime scenes. GameRevolution's Blake Peterson praised the real-time management of information, upgrades and equipment that he considered made Batman more vulnerable, although Barnett included this as a point of criticism.

For the "Harley Quinn's Revenge" DLC, IGN's Greg Miller scored the content 9 out of 10 and gave it an Editor's Choice designation. Miller said that it "is what downloadable content should be", but criticized the lack of variety in the missions and the lack of conclusion to some plot threads. Eurogamer's Christian Donlan gave the DLC a score of 7 out of 10, and said that Harley Quinn worked as well as the Joker as a narrative focus. Donlan said that Robin was "enormous fun to play", but criticized the DLC for not offering anything not present in the main game. Kotaku's Stephen Totilo was critical of the DLC, saying that it diminished his desire to replay the main game and describing it as "delicious a dessert as a poison-filled Joker pie to the face". Totilo said it presented an emotionless, inconclusive journey, composed of unused material from the main game.

=== Sales ===
Arkham City is one of the fastest selling games in history. Worldwide, two million units were sold in its first week from approximately 4.6 million shipped units, compared to Arkham Asylum's 4.3 million units sold in its entire release. On February 8, 2012, it was announced that more than six million units of the game had been shipped since release.

During the first week of sales in the United Kingdom, Batman: Arkham City became the number-one selling game on all available formats, replacing FIFA 12 atop the charts for PlayStation 3, Xbox 360, and all-format games. It became the fourth-biggest launch of 2011 after FIFA 12, Gears of War 3, and L.A. Noire. It became the biggest UK game launch in the history of Warner Bros., doubling the first week sales of Arkham Asylum. It was the tenth-best-selling game of 2011 with approximately ten weeks in release, and the 34th-best-selling game of 2012.

According to NPD Group, Batman: Arkham City was the second-best-selling game in the United States for October 2011, selling 1.5 million copies across available formats, the tenth-best-selling in November, and the seventh-best-selling game overall in 2011. Game-rental service GameFly announced that it was the most requested game of 2011, beating out Call of Duty: Modern Warfare 3.

=== Awards ===
Batman: Arkham City won multiple awards at the 2011 Spike Video Game Awards including: Character of the Year (Joker), Best Xbox 360 Game, Best Action Adventure Game, and Best Adapted Video Game; and received nominations for: Best Original Score, Best Graphics, Best Performance by a Human Female (Tara Strong), Best Performance by a Human Male (Mark Hamill), Trailer of the Year (Hugo Strange Reveal Trailer), Studio of the Year (Rocksteady), and Game of the Year. During the AIAS' 15th Annual Interactive Achievement Awards (now known as the D.I.C.E. Awards), Arkham City was awarded with Adventure Game of the Year; it also received nominations for Game of the Year and outstanding achievement in Animation, Art Direction, Gameplay Engineering, and Game Direction.

The 2012 British Academy of Film and Television (BAFTA) awards saw the game win two awards for Performer (Mark Hamill) and Action game, and receive nominations for: Artistic Achievement; Audio Achievement; Best Game; Design; Original Music; Story; and the publicly voted GAME Award of 2011. Paul Crocker, Paul Dini, and Sefton Hill were nominated for the Video Game Writing award by the Writers Guild of America, and Crocker won the Best Videogame Script award from the Writers' Guild of Great Britain. The National Academy of Video Game Trade Reviewers awarded the game in the categories Control Design and Lighting/Texturing. The game was also awarded as Outstanding Action / Adventure Game by the 16th Satellite Awards. At the 2012 Develop Awards the game won in the category Use of a License and the International 3D Society awarded the game in the category 3D Videogame – PC. At the 5th Annual Cody Awards the game won in the category Best Licensed Game and it was nominated in other categories (Game of the Year, Studio of the Year, Best Action-Adventure Game, Best Graphics).

The Daily Telegraph awarded the game Best Original Score (Nick Arundel) and Game of the Year, with a statement that said: "as a video game, it's a magnificent piece of work, but it also shines as a unique, lovingly-crafted slice of Batman fiction." The newspaper also nominated the game for: Best Director (Sefton Hill); Best Acting Performance (Mark Hamill and Nolan North); and Best Developer (Rocksteady Studios). The game was nominated for Game of the Year and Best Game Design at the Game Developers Choice Awards, and Game Audio Network Guild award's for Music of the Year, Best Soundtrack Album, Best Audio Mix, and Best Original Vocal – Choral for the track "Main Theme". The game was named the Best Action/Adventure Game and Best Overall Game of 2011 as part of the 2011 Yahoo! Games Game of the Year awards. Batman: Arkham City received several honors from GameTrailers, including Best Xbox 360 Game of the Year, Best PC Game of 2011, as well as Best Action/Adventure game. It also won the Best Action-Adventure Game award at the 2012 Golden Joystick Awards, and was nominated for Top Gaming Moment for the game's ending, Best DLC for "Harley Quinn's Revenge", and the overall Ultimate Game of the Year. It was nominated for Game of the Decade at the 2012 Spike Video Game Awards.

According to Metacritic, the PlayStation 3 version of the game was the highest-rated game of 2011; and across all formats, the game was tied with the role-playing game The Elder Scrolls V: Skyrim as the highest-rated game of 2011. This also tied Arkham City for the sixth-highest-rated game ever.

Batman: Arkham City appeared on several lists of the top video games of 2011, including these: number 1 by E! Online, and CNET; number 2 by Gamasutra, CNN, and Slant Magazine; number 3 by Digital Spy, Joystiq, VentureBeat, and Wired; number 5 by the Associated Press, and Time; and number 10 by the Daily Mirror.

Several international video game websites and magazines labeled Arkham City as their favorite Game of the Year and as their favorite Action/Adventure Game.

GameSpot labeled it the Best Action/Adventure Game as part of its Best of 2011 series, Game Informer named it their Best Action/Adventure game of 2011 in their February 2012 issue, and highlighted specific points of the game including placing Batman number 1 on their list of the Top Ten Heroes, and the Mr. Freeze boss fight number 4 on their list of Top Ten Video Games Moments. Always Game Informer labeled the game as Best Adventure Game on its Best of E3 2011 Awards. PlayStation Official Magazine UK placed Batman: Arkham City as their number 2 Game Of the Year. IGN labeled it as Best PC Action Game and as Best Overall Action Game of 2011 and the game won the IGN People's Choice Awards for Best Xbox 360 Action Game and Best Xbox 360 Story. At the Official Xbox Magazine Game of the Year 2011 Awards the game was awarded as Best Action-Adventure Game and became runner-up in the categories Best Story and Best Voice Acting. DieHard GameFan awarded the game as Best Action Game and Game of the Year. The BTVA Voice Acting Awards awarded the game in the categories Best Male Vocal Performance in a Video Game (Mark Hamill) and Best Vocal Ensemble in a Video Game. The game also won in the category Best Interactive Animation at the Pulcinella Awards. The game also won in two categories at the X-Play Awards 2011. 1UP.com placed the game's main theme song as number 6 on its "Top 10 Theme Songs of 2011". The game also won as Best Game at the Stan Lee Awards. At the 2012 Digital Dragons Awards, the game won in the category European Game of the Year.

In January 2012, Eurogamer listed it as the third-best game of 2012. In November 2012, Time named it one of the 100 greatest video games of all time and said, "It's hard to imagine a better superhero game than Batman: Arkham City. It's also hard to imagine a better video game in general." Also in November, Entertainment Weekly named it one of the ten best games of the past decade (2002–2012) and said, "this is the definitive superhero adventure of the decade."

In 2013, Game Informer named it the best superhero game of all time, and GamingBolt listing it at number 62 on its list of the 100 Greatest Video Games Ever Made.

In 2014, Empire placed it at number 12 on its list of the 100 Greatest Video Games of All Time, ahead of Arkham Asylum at number 28. PC Gamer named it the 68th-best PC Game, and IGN named it the 24th-best PC game of the preceding decade, and the 16th-best game of the contemporary console generation.

In 2019, IGN listed it as the 54th-best video game of all time. Metacritic, The Hollywood Reporter, Forbes, and IGN put the game among the best video games of the decade 2010–2019.

In 2023, IGN Nordic placed the game 8th on its list of the best PS3 games of all time.

List of awards and nominations
Year	Award	Category	Recipient	Result	Ref.
2011	Game Critics Awards	Best of Show	Batman: Arkham City	Nominated	
2011	Game Critics Awards	Best Action/Adventure Game	Batman: Arkham City	Nominated	
2011	Game Critics Awards	Best Console Game	Batman: Arkham City	Nominated	
2011	Spike Video Game Awards	Best Action Adventure Game	Batman: Arkham City	Won	
2011	Spike Video Game Awards	Best Adapted Video Game	Batman: Arkham City	Won	
2011	Spike Video Game Awards	Best Graphics	Batman: Arkham City	Nominated	
2011	Spike Video Game Awards	Best Original Score	Batman: Arkham City	Nominated	
2011	Spike Video Game Awards	Best Performance by a Human Female	Tara Strong (for Harley Quinn)	Nominated	
2011	Spike Video Game Awards	Best Performance by a Human Male	Mark Hamill (for the Joker)	Nominated	
2011	Spike Video Game Awards	Studio of the Year	Rocksteady Studios	Nominated	
2011	Spike Video Game Awards	Best Xbox 360 Game	Batman: Arkham City	Won	
2011	Spike Video Game Awards	Character of the Year	Joker	Won	
2011	Spike Video Game Awards	Game of the Year	Batman: Arkham City	Nominated	
2011	Spike Video Game Awards	Trailer of the Year	Hugo Strange Reveal Trailer	Nominated	
2011	16th Satellite Awards	Outstanding Action / Adventure Game	Batman: Arkham City	Won	
2011	National Academy of Video Game Trade Reviewers	Game of the Year	Batman: Arkham City	Nominated	
2011	National Academy of Video Game Trade Reviewers	Control Design, 3D	Batman: Arkham City	Won	
2011	National Academy of Video Game Trade Reviewers	Game Design, Franchise	Batman: Arkham City	Nominated	
2011	National Academy of Video Game Trade Reviewers	Lighting/Texturing	Batman: Arkham City	Won	
2011	National Academy of Video Game Trade Reviewers	Game Sequel Action	Batman: Arkham City	Nominated	
2011	BTVA Voice Acting Awards	Best Male Vocal Performance in a Video Game	Corey Burton as Hugo Strange	Nominated	
2011	BTVA Voice Acting Awards	Best Male Vocal Performance in a Video Game	Mark Hamill as the Joker	Won	
2011	BTVA Voice Acting Awards	Best Female Vocal Performance in a Video Game	Grey DeLisle-Griffin as Catwoman/Selina Kyle	Nominated	
2011	BTVA Voice Acting Awards	Best Female Vocal Performance in a Video Game	Tara Strong as Harley Quinn/Harleen Quinzel	Nominated	
2011	BTVA Voice Acting Awards	Best Vocal Ensemble in a Video Game	Batman: Arkham City	Won	
2012	15th Annual Interactive Achievement Awards	Game of the Year	Batman: Arkham City	Nominated	
2012	15th Annual Interactive Achievement Awards	Adventure Game of the Year	Batman: Arkham City	Won	
2012	15th Annual Interactive Achievement Awards	Outstanding Achievement in Animation	Batman: Arkham City	Nominated	
2012	15th Annual Interactive Achievement Awards	Outstanding Achievement in Art Direction	Batman: Arkham City	Nominated	
2012	15th Annual Interactive Achievement Awards	Outstanding Achievement in Game Direction	Batman: Arkham City	Nominated	
2012	15th Annual Interactive Achievement Awards	Outstanding Achievement in Gameplay Engineering	Batman: Arkham City	Nominated	
2012	Writers Guild of America	Video Game Writing	Paul Crocker (Lead Narrative Designer); Paul Dini, Paul Crocker, and Sefton Hill (Story)	Nominated	
2012	Develop Awards 2012	Use of a License	Batman: Arkham City	Won	
2012	International 3D Society	3D Videogame – PC	Batman: Arkham City	Won	
2012	Game Developers Choice Awards	Best Game Design	Batman: Arkham City	Nominated	
2012	Game Developers Choice Awards	Game of the Year	Batman: Arkham City	Nominated	
2012	Game Audio Network Guild	Best Audio Mix	Batman: Arkham City	Nominated	
2012	Game Audio Network Guild	Best Original Vocal – Choral	"Main Theme"	Nominated	
2012	Game Audio Network Guild	Best Soundtrack Album	Batman: Arkham City	Nominated	
2012	Game Audio Network Guild	Music of the Year	Batman: Arkham City	Nominated	
2012	British Academy of Film and Television	Action game	Batman: Arkham City	Won	
2012	British Academy of Film and Television	Artistic Achievement	Batman: Arkham City	Nominated	
2012	British Academy of Film and Television	Audio Achievement	Batman: Arkham City	Nominated	
2012	British Academy of Film and Television	Best Game	Batman: Arkham City	Nominated	
2012	British Academy of Film and Television	Design	Batman: Arkham City	Nominated	
2012	British Academy of Film and Television	GAME Award of 2011	Batman: Arkham City	Nominated	
2012	British Academy of Film and Television	Original Music	Batman: Arkham City	Nominated	
2012	British Academy of Film and Television	Performer	Mark Hamill (for the Joker)	Won	
2012	British Academy of Film and Television	Story	Batman: Arkham City	Nominated	
2012	Golden Joystick Awards	Best Action-Adventure	Batman: Arkham City	Won	
2012	Golden Joystick Awards	Best DLC	Batman: Arkham City for Harley Quinn's Revenge (Third Place)	Nominated	
2012	Golden Joystick Awards	The Golden Joystick Ultimate Game of the Year	Batman: Arkham City	Nominated	
2012	Golden Joystick Awards	Top Gaming Moment	Batman: Arkham City for The Ending	Nominated	
2012	Spike Video Game Awards	Game of the Decade	Batman: Arkham City	Nominated	
2012	Writers' Guild of Great Britain	Best Videogame Script	Paul Crocker	Won	
2012	Pulcinella Awards	Best Interactive Animation	Batman: Arkham City	Won	
2012	Digital Dragons Awards	European Game of the Year	Batman: Arkham City	Won	

=== Technical issues ===
During launch week, issues were found to exist in the code-restricted content. Some customers discovered the code to be missing from their copy, preventing them from obtaining the Catwoman story missions. The problem was reported by customers in Canada, the United States, and the United Kingdom. Warner Bros. issued a statement claiming that the missing codes had affected less than 0.5% of customers. Upon release in the United Kingdom, a technical issue rendered the game unplayable for some players, booting them from the game with an error message that the "downloadable content is corrupt." Rocksteady European community manager Sarah Wellock claimed that the fault lay with the PlayStation Network and Xbox Live online systems.

In early November 2011, Rocksteady confirmed that it was investigating reports by numerous users that save files for the Xbox 360 version of the game were being erased without prompting, resulting in players losing their progress and being unable to complete the game. On launch, performance issues arose for the PC version when DirectX 11 features were enabled; the developer acknowledged the inconvenience and recommended running the game with DirectX 9 until a title update was released to address this matter.

== Sequels ==
Batman: Arkham Origins, the successor to Arkham City, was announced in April 2013. The game was developed by WB Games Montréal for PlayStation 3, Wii U, Windows, and Xbox 360, and was released on October 25, 2013. Set several years before the events of Arkham Asylum, Arkham Origins follows a younger and less experienced Batman on Christmas Eve on the streets of Gotham City as he faces off against eight deadly assassins. A separate title, Batman: Arkham Origins Blackgate, was developed for Nintendo 3DS and PlayStation Vita by Armature Studios, and was released on the same day. Dini stated that he would not be involved in writing a sequel. He had not been included in writing for any of Arkham City's DLC, including the story-based "Harley Quinn's Revenge" DLC, and said that Warner Bros. and Rocksteady suggested that he take work elsewhere if offered.

Batman: Arkham Knight, the successor to Arkham Origins, was announced in March 2014. Developed by Rocksteady for PlayStation 4, Windows, and Xbox One, the game was released on June 23, 2015. Arkham Knight is set nine months after the events of Arkham City and follows Batman as he confronts an assault on Gotham City by the Scarecrow, and his ally, the Arkham Knight.
