= Hugo Strange =

Comic book supervillain

- Cover to Batman: Gotham Knights #9 (November 2000); art by Brian Bolland

Publication information
- Publisher: DC Comics
- First appearance: Detective Comics #36 (February 1940)
- Created by: Bill Finger (writer); Bob Kane (artist)

In-story information
- Team affiliations: Cabal
- Notable aliases: Doctor Todhunter
- Abilities: Genius-level intellect; Criminal mastermind; Trained in psychiatry, chemistry, and biology

Hugo Strange is a supervillain appearing in American comic books published by DC Comics, commonly as an adversary of the superhero Batman. The character is one of Batman's first recurring villains, and was also one of the first to discover his secret identity. He first appeared in Detective Comics #36 (February 1940).

A notorious enemy of Batman, Hugo Strange is often portrayed as a deranged psychologist and mad scientist who analyzes, manipulates, and breaks the minds of his patients and enemies rather than relying purely on physical force, and has appeared in various forms of non-comics media, including animation, video games, and the live-action television series Gotham, where he is portrayed by BD Wong.

== Fictional character biography ==
=== Pre-Crisis ===
==== Golden Age ====
Hugo Strange first appears in Detective Comics #36 (February 1940) as a scientist and criminal mastermind who uses a stolen "concentrated lightning" machine to generate a dense fog every night so his gang can rob banks unseen, though he knows that Batman poses a threat to him. Batman, who already knows of Strange's experiments, begins investigating him after one of Strange's henchmen commits a murder. When the robbers are apprehended, Strange vows to set a trap for Batman and deal with him personally. He has a dozen of his men ambush the vigilante, and one of them manages to knock him out with a blackjack. Batman wakes up in Strange's lair, where Strange hangs him from his wrists and lashes him with a whip. Batman breaks the ropes, gasses the room, and defeats Strange, who is jailed but quickly begins planning his escape.

In Batman #1 (spring 1940), Strange carries out his escape plan, recruits a new gang of criminals, then breaks out five patients from an insane asylum and uses them as test subjects, turning them into monsters using an artificial growth hormone. He outfits them with bulletproof clothing, and uses them to rampage through Gotham City and distract the police while his men commit robberies. Strange administers the serum to Batman after the giants capture him, saying it will work in 18 hours. Batman tricks two of the monsters into killing each other and creates a drug that prevents any abnormal secretions from the pituitary gland, preventing the transformation. After dealing with all the remaining monsters, Batman sends Strange to his apparent death in a fall from a cliff, although he suspects that the mad scientist has survived.

In Detective Comics #46 (December 1940), Strange returns and starts spreading a fear-inducing powder around the city until a punch from Batman again sends him falling off a cliff to his apparent death.

==== Earth-One ====
Hugo Strange returns in the "Strange Apparitions" story arc in Detective Comics #469-479 (May 1977-September–October 1978). Having survived his earlier "death", Strange left Gotham City and went to Europe for several years, where his criminal career prospered with no one to challenge him. Bored and hoping to pit his wits against Batman again, Strange, now using the alias of Dr. Todhunter, opens a private hospital, Graytowers Clinic, for Gotham's wealthiest citizens, where he holds them for ransom before mutating them into mindless monsters. When Bruce Wayne checks into the hospital to recover discreetly from radiation burns he sustained while fighting Doctor Phosphorus, Strange learns that Wayne is Batman and uses this information to wreak havoc on his personal life. Strange attempts to auction the identity of Batman to Rupert Thorne, Penguin, and Joker. Not wanting to lose, Thorne has Strange abducted and beaten by his men to reveal Batman's identity, but Strange apparently dies without ever telling him. Strange's ghost returns to haunt Thorne, driving him insane. Thorne confesses his corruption and is sent to Arkham Asylum.

Strange is later revealed to have survived the beating from Thorne's men by using yoga techniques to slow his heartbeat to an undetectable level, then faked the existence of his ghost to haunt Thorne. Strange attempts to weaken Bruce Wayne through the use of drugs and lifelike robots called Mandroids, with the ultimate goal of destroying Wayne completely and taking his place as Batman. The plan fails, and Strange apparently dies once more when he attempts to kill Batman by blowing up a replica of Wayne Manor with himself in it, stating that if he cannot be Batman, then no one can.

Having faked his death, Strange returns yet again in Batman Annual #10 (1986), in another attempt to destroy Batman and Bruce Wayne, this time attempting to financially bankrupt Wayne by using various tricks to force shareholders to sell their stock holdings to him so he could bankrupt the company. However, Strange is defeated and sent to prison. Batman is able to stop Strange from further exploiting his knowledge of his secret identity by falsely claiming that he hypnotized Strange to give him a fake idea of Batman's true identity just before Commissioner Gordon shows up to arrest him.

==== Earth-Two ====
The Earth-Two version of Strange has a similar early history to the Earth-One version and also survives the fall that he experienced in Detective Comics #46. In The Brave and the Bold #182 (January 1982), it is revealed that the fall left him paralyzed but, after years of physical therapy, he regains enough movement to write out the surgical techniques needed to repair the damage to his body, bribing a surgeon to perform the operation. The surgeon lacks Strange's skill, and the operation leaves Strange deformed. Strange uses one of his devices to capture Starman's Cosmic Rod to use its power to attack everyone and everything that Batman holds dear. He generates a storm in Gotham to obtain the device, which creates a dimensional doorway to Earth-One. Strange brings that universe's Batman over to Earth-Two, which allows him and Earth-Two's Robin to team up with Earth-Two's Batwoman to defeat Strange. Strange realizes that he is angry at his own wasted life and deformed body, and uses the Cosmic Rod to commit suicide.

=== Post-Crisis ===
In the post-Crisis continuity, Strange is reintroduced in the "Prey" storyline as an eccentric private psychiatrist enlisted to help a task force assigned to capture Batman by providing them with a psychological profile of the vigilante. While brilliant at his work, Strange is depicted as being equally unbalanced: he becomes so obsessed with the case, he starts wearing a replica Batman costume in private, convinced that he alone understands the darkness that drives Batman.

Strange was raised in an orphanage on the lower East Side of Gotham City, in a neighborhood known as "Hell's Crucible". As an adult, he became a professor of psychiatry at Gotham State University, but had his tenure suspended after using his position to promote a series of increasingly bizarre genetic engineering theories. He is approached by an Indian man named Sanjay, who seeks Strange's aid in curing his sick brother. Strange agrees to help, and Sanjay works loyally by his side from that point onward. Borrowing money from Sal Maroni, who is in the employ of Carmine Falcone, Strange sets up a private laboratory to test his theories. He then bribes a corrupt orderly to supply him with ideal test subjects: inmates from Arkham Asylum who have been institutionalized for so long that they will not be missed.

Strange's experiments transform his test subjects into "Monster Men", possessing superhuman strength and cannibalistic instincts. Strange uses the Monster Men to commit crimes so he can put together the money needed to pay back his Mafia connections. Batman becomes involved after discovering some of the gruesome remains of the Monster's Men's cannibalistic rampages. When Strange sets his creations free at an illegal poker game, helping himself to the victims' money after the slaughter, the Gotham Mafia begins to grow suspicious. Batman tracks Strange down, but is captured by Sanjay and thrown to the Monster Men as an intended meal. Batman not only holds off the creatures, but uses them as part of an inventive escape. Strange is enthralled by Batman, believing that he has found a genetically perfect man. He creates one final Monster Man using a drop of Batman's blood, and while his creation still has many of the flaws of its "brothers", it lacks most of the grotesque disfigurements that had plagued Strange's earlier creations. Strange is subsequently forced to destroy his lab to evade capture. Soon after, he sends the Monster Men to attack Falcone's private estate, including Sanjay's brother, who had also been mutated as a result of Strange's treatments. Strange intends to wipe out the Mob's leaders, erasing his debt and covering up their ties to his work. In the battle that follows, all of the Monster Men are killed, along with Sanjay, who abandons Strange and dies trying to avenge his brother. Strange escapes amid the chaos, and succeeds in eradicating all links between himself and his experiments. Confident that his criminal past is buried, he begins to appear on TV by reinventing himself as a "psychological expert" on Batman.

Partly due to Strange's appearances on TV claiming to understand Batman's motives, Captain James Gordon is ordered to assemble a task force to apprehend the vigilante, with Strange assisting him as a consultant to deduce Batman's secret identity. As the task force's investigation progresses, Strange grows increasingly maniacal in his obsession with Batman, going so far as expressing a desire to become Batman and dressing up in a replica Batsuit. To that end, Strange attempts to kill the Caped Crusader. However, Strange repeatedly underestimates the level of physical conditioning that is needed to be Batman. Strange also diagnoses Batman with various mental illnesses, such as explaining Batman's use of a costume as symptomatic of dissociative identity disorder, whereas Gordon more accurately explains the Batsuit's intended purpose as scaring criminals. Strange concludes that Bruce Wayne is most likely Batman, brainwashes the task force's commander to impersonate Batman to turn the public against him and sends him to kidnap the Mayor's daughter while dressed as Batman. Despite Strange's attempt to psychologically "break" Batman by creating recordings and setting up mannequins of Thomas and Martha Wayne blaming Bruce for their deaths, using Wayne Manor to enhance his illusions, Bruce is able to collect himself and focus in the Batcave. The following day, he confronts Strange and tricks him into doubting his own hypothesis about Batman's secret identity, claiming that his parents are alive and living in Paraguay. Strange is ultimately exposed and shot by the task force when he attempts to escape, before falling into a river and being presumed dead.

In Doug Moench's "Terror" storyline, Strange mysteriously returns. He decides to work with another of Batman's enemies, Scarecrow, and use him as a tool to help him capture Batman, while simultaneously having fallen into a further delusional state, as he engages in a "relationship" with a female mannequin dressed in Batman's cowl, reflecting his warped dual admiration and loathing of Batman. Scarecrow turns on Strange when the professor's therapy proves effective enough to turn Scarecrow against his "benefactor", tricking Strange into falling into the cellar of his mansion base where the twisted psychiatrist is impaled on a weather vane that Scarecrow had left in the cellar earlier. Scarecrow then uses Strange's mansion as a trap for Batman, but his attempt to use Strange's plan fails when he tries to use Crime Alley as the scene of a trap while ignorant of the reasons why that alley is so significant to Batman, with his "trap" merely consisting of luring Batman into the alley and decapitating a former classmate of Crane's in front of the hero. With Catwoman's help, Batman locates Scarecrow's hideout and catches Scarecrow in the cellar with Strange's body before the house is destroyed in a fire, but loses sight of Strange, with it being unclear whether Strange had actually survived the fall onto the weather vane – he claimed that he lured rats to himself by using his sweat so that he could eat them – or if Scarecrow and Batman were hallucinating from exposure to Crane's fear gas, although Batman concludes that the subsequent explosion of the house has definitely killed Strange.

Strange returns in a four-part storyline called "Transference". Initially appearing in his own Batsuit, he captures Catwoman with the aid of his henchwoman Dora – a former patient whom he has subjected to extensive mental conditioning by Strange to act as a new "Catwoman" – and attempts to interrogate her about Batman's current status, Strange dismissing the existence of Batman's new allies by proclaiming them to be "parasites", as he cannot accept that Batman would share his "power" with anyone. He is then shown posing as a psychiatrist doing standard stress evaluations at Wayne Enterprises. While Bruce Wayne is on the couch, Strange drugs him with a powerful hallucinogen to coax Wayne into admitting that he is Batman. Wayne is able to escape by using cleaning fluid to start a fire, fakes Batman's death by destroying the Batmobile with him supposedly in it, and triggers a post-hypnotic suggestion in himself, forcing him to completely repress the Batman aspect of his mind until Robin and Nightwing can defeat Strange. Faced with Nightwing and Robin each denying that Wayne is Batman and witnessing Wayne's complete lack of combat reflexes and training, Strange becomes concerned that his theory that Bruce Wayne is Batman has been disproved and realizes that he will never be able to learn the truth now that he "killed" Batman. Faced with this conflicting situation, Strange has a mental breakdown and voluntarily turns himself in at Arkham Asylum.

=== The New 52 ===
In the continuity of The New 52, the 2011 reboot of the DC Universe, Detective Comics (vol. 2) introduces Hugo Strange's son, Eli Strange, for the first time. Eli is first seen playing a game of poker with members of the Russian Mob, betting a valuable bracelet, winning big and cleaning house. Before he can walk away with his winnings, one of the mobsters forces him to play another hand, then discovers Eli's sleeve is loaded with cards. Before he can have him killed, the criminals realize that their bracelet (Eli's was a fake replica) had been stolen. Catwoman then pounces from the ceiling and takes out the entire group. She thanks Eli for being her distraction (the two having been working together the entire time) and tells him to run home to his father, which he is last seen doing.

Strange tasks his son with overseeing an operation to dose Gotham with fear gas. Scarecrow led Batman to believe that a small boy in a picture would be harmed unless he put a stop to it. Arriving at the scene, Batman realizes that the small boy was actually Eli. He manages to avert the disaster and Eli is arrested. Later, Batman reveals that "Eli Strange" is actually an alias and that the boy's real name is Elliot Montrose.

In Forever Evil, Hugo Strange is among the supervillains recruited by the Crime Syndicate to join the Secret Society of Super Villains.

=== DC Rebirth ===
In the continuity of DC Rebirth, DC Comics' 2016 relaunch of its monthly superhero books, Hugo Strange appears during the "Night of the Monster Men" crossover story line. Although apparently now ignorant of Batman's identity, he is now determined to prove his superiority by attacking Gotham with a group of "Monster Men" created from the corpses of his former patients as representations of what Strange perceives as Batman's greatest flaws - his ego, grief, and fear - which ultimately provokes Batman into a confrontation at Strange's office penthouse headquarters. Strange wears what he terms a "suicide suit" - a near-replica of the Batsuit without the cape and cowl that is rigged to detonate if its wearer is subjected to any physical attack - on the assumption that Batman will have no choice but to surrender the cowl to him as the "true" Batman since he cannot take a life. Nightwing is able to defeat the final monster - an amalgamation of the previous ones - by literally leaping inside it to inject it with a prepared antidote, while Batman outwits Strange by having his ally Clayface cover the penthouse in an airtight seal prior to the confrontation. Strange, delirious and running out of oxygen, loses consciousness while Batman is still standing, Nightwing musing that Strange failed to realize that Batman's flaws were actually his motivation in protecting Gotham.

Hugo Strange later appears as a member of the Cabal alongside Doctor Psycho, Per Degaton, Queen Bee, and Amazo.

== Other versions ==
An alternate universe version of Hugo Strange appears in DC Comics Bombshells. This version is a eugenicist who seeks to improve the gene pool by removing those he considers "unclean". In pursuit of this goal, he allies with the Penguin and Harvey Dent, using the latter for his access to Gotham City's citizens' genes to control their future generations. However, Dent later betrays Strange and the Penguin to help the Batgirls. Strange flees and receives funding from the Soviets to research and create clones of Supergirl. Chief among them are Power Girl, who became the Soviet Union's secret weapon, and Superman, who he considered a failure. A year later, Strange captures Supergirl and Steve Trevor, intending to use her as a guinea pig to create an army to purge the world, only for Supergirl to turn Power Girl against him before the Reaper and Lois Lane find his lab and rescue his captives.

== In other media ==
=== Television ===
Hugo Strange as depicted in Batman: The Animated Series

Hugo Strange as depicted in Justice League Unlimited

Hugo Strange as depicted in The Batman

Hugo Strange (portrayed by BD Wong) as depicted in Gotham

- Hugo Strange appears in series set in the DC Animated Universe (DCAU):
  - Strange first appears in the Batman: The Animated Series episode "The Strange Secret of Bruce Wayne", voiced by Ray Buktenica. This version is a psychiatrist who runs a rest hospital that he uses to blackmail Gotham's elite via a mind-reading machine.
  - Hugo Strange makes a non-speaking cameo appearance in the Justice League Unlimited episode "The Doomsday Sanction" as a member of Project Cadmus. Strange was also meant to appear in the episode "Question Authority", but was replaced by Doctor Moon due to the Bat-embargo.
- Hugo Strange appears in The Batman, initially voiced by Frank Gorshin and later by Richard Green. This version is initially Arkham Asylum's chief psychologist before he becomes an inmate after unleashing an advanced robot based on Gotham's criminals called D.A.V.E. He later allies with the alien Joining, who give him universal knowledge that leaves him catatonic.
- Hugo Strange makes a non-speaking cameo appearance in the Batman: The Brave and the Bold episode "The Knights of Tomorrow!".
- Hugo Strange appears in Young Justice, voiced by Adrian Pasdar. This version is the chief psychiatrist, later warden, of Belle Reve Penitentiary and member of the Light.
- Hugo Strange appears in Gotham, portrayed by BD Wong. This version is the Chief of Psychiatry at Arkham Asylum and overseer of Indian Hill, a secret division of Wayne Enterprises that experiments on metahumans, who secretly works to revive the dead with assistance from the Court of Owls. Additionally, he is a friend and colleague of Thomas Wayne who hired Patrick Malone to kill Thomas and his wife Martha. Strange briefly works for Oswald Cobblepot before defecting to the League of Assassins.
- Hugo Strange appears in Batman: Caped Crusader, voiced by James Urbaniak.

=== Film ===
==== Live-action ====
- Hugo Strange appears in Batman, portrayed by Michael Balfour.

==== Animation ====
- Hugo Strange appears in Batman: Strange Days, voiced by Brian George.
- Hugo Strange appears in The Lego Batman Movie as one of several villains recruited by the Joker.
- Hugo Strange appears in Batman vs. Two-Face, voiced by Jim Ward. This version is a Gotham State Penitentiary doctor who created an "Evil Extractor", which he claims will purify villains of corruption.
- An alternate universe variant of Hugo Strange appears in Batman: Gotham by Gaslight, voiced by William Salyers. This version is Arkham Asylum's director who is fascinated by the concepts of masks and alternate identities, which draws him to Batman and Jack the Ripper. He is later killed by his patients after Jack throws him into a pit filled with them.

=== Video games ===
Hugo Strange as depicted in a cinematic trailer for Batman: Arkham City

- Hugo Strange appears as a playable character in the Nintendo DS version of Lego Batman: The Videogame.
- A character bio for Hugo Strange appears in Batman: Arkham Asylum.
- Hugo Strange appears in Batman: Arkham City, voiced by Corey Burton. This version is the warden of the titular super-prison and a secret disciple of Ra's al Ghul, with whom he conspires to purge Arkham City's criminal population. After their plan is thwarted by Batman, Strange is killed by Ra's for his failure.
- Hugo Strange makes a cameo appearance in Injustice: Gods Among Us via the Arkham Asylum stage.
- Hugo Strange appears as a character summon in Scribblenauts Unmasked: A DC Comics Adventure.
- Hugo Strange appears as a playable character in Lego DC Super-Villains, voiced again by Corey Burton.

=== Miscellaneous ===
- Hugo Strange appears in The Batman Adventures.
- Hugo Strange appears in Batman: The Brave and the Bold #10.
- Hugo Strange appears in Batman Unburied, voiced by John Rhys-Davies.
- Huge Strange appears in Batman '66. This version is a psychiatrist at the Arkham Institute.
- Hugo Strange appears in Batman: Resurrection, written by John Jackson Miller.
- Hugo Strange appears as part of the LEGO Batman Movie series 2 collection for the Lego Minifigures theme.

== See also ==
- List of Batman family enemies
