= Gotham season 5 =

Fifth season of the TV series Gotham

Gotham
- Season 5
- Home media cover art
- Starring: Ben McKenzie; Donal Logue; David Mazouz; Morena Baccarin; Sean Pertwee; Robin Lord Taylor; Erin Richards; Camren Bicondova; Cory Michael Smith; Jessica Lucas; Chris Chalk
- No. of episodes: 12

Release
- Original network: Fox
- Original release: January 3 – April 25, 2019

Series chronology
- ← Previous; Gotham season 4 Next → Pennyworth season 1

The fifth and final season of the American television series Gotham, based on characters from DC Comics related to the Batman franchise, revolves around the characters of James "Jim" Gordon and Bruce Wayne. The season is produced by Primrose Hill Productions, DC Entertainment, and Warner Bros. Television, with John Stephens serving as the showrunner. The season was inspired and adapted elements from the comic book storylines of Batman: No Man's Land and Batman: Zero Year. The subtitle for the season is Legend of the Dark Knight.

The season was ordered in May 2018. Production began that July and ended that December. Ben McKenzie stars as Gordon, alongside returning principal cast members Donal Logue, David Mazouz, Morena Baccarin, Sean Pertwee, Robin Lord Taylor, Erin Richards, Camren Bicondova, Cory Michael Smith, Jessica Lucas and Chris Chalk. The fifth season premiered on January 3, 2019, on Fox and concluded on April 25, 2019, consisting of 12 episodes. A prequel series, Pennyworth, developed by a returning Bruno Heller and Danny Cannon, and starring Jack Bannon as a younger version of the iteration of Alfred Pennyworth portrayed by Pertwee in Gotham, began airing its 10-episode first season on Epix in July 2019.

== Cast and characters ==
=== Main ===
- Ben McKenzie as James "Jim" Gordon
- Donal Logue as Harvey Bullock
- David Mazouz as Bruce Wayne
- Morena Baccarin as Leslie "Lee" Thompkins (Note: Only credited for the episodes she appears in.)
- Sean Pertwee as Alfred Pennyworth
- Robin Lord Taylor as Oswald Cobblepot / Penguin
- Erin Richards as Barbara Kean
- Camren Bicondova as Selina Kyle
- Cory Michael Smith as Edward Nygma / Riddler
- Jessica Lucas as Tabitha Galavan (Note: Only credited in "Year Zero".)
- Chris Chalk as Lucius Fox

=== Recurring ===
- Kelcy Griffin as Vanessa Harper
- Hunter Jones as Will Thomas
- Jaime Murray as Nyssa al Ghul
- Francesca Root-Dodson as Ecco
- J. W. Cortes as Alvarez
- Cameron Monaghan as Jeremiah Valeska
- Shane West as Eduardo Dorrance / Bane

=== Guest ===
- David W. Thompson as Jonathan Crane / Scarecrow
- Andrew Sellon as Arthur Penn / Ventriloquist
- Peyton List as Ivy "Pamela" Pepper / Poison Ivy
- Alex Morf as Sykes
- David Kallaway as Tank
- Will Meyers as Gabriel
- Anthony Carrigan as Victor Zsasz
- BD Wong as Hugo Strange
- Shiva Kalaiselvan as Lelia
- Marceline Hugot as Gretel
- David Carranza as Angel Vallelunga
- Sarah Schenkkan as Magpie
- Benedict Samuel as Jervis Tetch / Mad Hatter
- Sarah Pidgeon as Jane Cartwright / Jane Doe
- Dan Hedaya as Dix
- Julian Gamble as Judge
- John Bedford Lloyd as General Wade
- Ann Harada as Mayor
- Richard Kind as Aubrey James
- Jeté Laurence as Barbara Lee Gordon
- Lili Simmons as adult Selina Kyle

== Episodes ==
No. overall	No. in season	Title	Directed by	Written by	Original release date	Prod. code	US viewers (millions)
Legend of the Dark Knight
89	1	"Year Zero"	Danny Cannon	John Stephens	January 3, 2019	T40.10051	2.54
Due to the bridges being bombed, the government has declared Gotham off-limits from the mainland, allowing criminals to control entire boroughs and neighborhoods. Gordon and the remaining GCPD officers gather refugees into the precinct for safety, while Bruce and Gordon work together to rid the city of crime. Scarecrow and his followers steal most of the GCPD's food and medicine, forcing Bruce to have Wayne Enterprises illegally fly supplies into the city. Cobblepot unsuccessfully tries to steal the supplies, and the resulting gunfight leads to Tabitha's death. Meanwhile, Nygma suffers memory blackouts and wakes up in different locations. Selina undergoes surgery to prevent her spine from collapsing, but remains paralyzed. When Selina unsuccessfully attempts suicide, one of the hospital's nurses advises Bruce to seek out "The Witch" to save her life.
90	2	"Trespassers"	Louis Shaw Milito	Danny Cannon	January 10, 2019	T40.10052	2.38
Bruce hunts down the Witch and discovers her to be Ivy, who has been captured by locals after killing instead of helping them. Ivy's powers have grown and allowed her to control plant life, which she feeds the corpses of anyone who enters her territory – the park. Despite this, Bruce convinces her to save Selina and reluctantly frees her in the process; she gives Bruce a seed that will repair Selina's spine but will also "change" her forever. Selina ingests the seed and regains the ability to walk, but also gains cat-like qualities. Gordon and Bullock discover a runaway child who claims to have been a slave for an outlaw gang. Gordon and Bullock rescue the children and bring them to the "Haven" safe zone, with Barbara saving Gordon in the process after Cobblepot places a bounty on him. Meanwhile, Nygma awakens and realizes he has kidnapped a gangster working for the Street Demons, though they have seemingly been killed by Cobblepot.
91	3	"Penguin, Our Hero"	Rob Bailey	Tze Chun	January 17, 2019	T40.10053	2.36
After her recovery, Selina escapes from the hospital and she and Bruce work together to track Jeremiah Valeska down to the dark zone of the city, where they discover that Ecco is recruiting people to work for him. Selina fakes wanting to work for Jeremiah to break into their headquarters, but after a showdown, Ecco escapes and Selina betrays Bruce to go after Jeremiah. Meanwhile, Cobblepot's men defect to Haven and he leads a small army to the area, where he captures Gordon and the refugees. However, the Street Demons, believing Cobblepot killed their men, take him prisoner and kill the defected thugs, forcing him and Gordon to work together and free themselves before killing the Street Demons. However, as Gordon allows Cobblepot to go free, Haven is blown up by an unknown perpetrator, killing the refugees.
92	4	"Ruin"	Nathan Hope	James Stoteraux & Chad Fiveash	January 24, 2019	T40.10054	2.35
Following the destruction of Haven, Gordon and Cobblepot reluctantly work together to track down Victor Zsasz, who is suspected of being the perpetrator, though he protests his innocence. After capturing him, Gordon asks Lucius to find evidence of Zsasz's guilt, and the latter encounters the disillusioned Nygma, who has discovered numbers written on his hand from the previous night. Nygma helps Lucius find the evidence, which proves Zsasz's innocence. Afterward, Nygma learns the numbers are for the apartment of a witness who saw him blow up Haven; regaining his memory of the event, Nygma kills the witness. Cobblepot captures Zsasz and organizes a kangaroo court where the Haven survivors ignore the evidence and order Zsasz's death, though Gordon and Bullock rescue him and let him go free, inadvertently turning the remaining refugees against them. After drowning his sorrows, a drunken Gordon reunites with Barbara and they kiss. Meanwhile, Selina follows Ecco to Jeremiah and manages to stab him multiple times, before being rescued by Bruce and Alfred.
93	5	"Pena Dura"	Mark Tonderai	Iturri Sosa	January 31, 2019	T40.10055	2.34
Eduardo Dorrance, a soldier who once worked with Gordon, arrives in Gotham with the military. Nygma goes on the run after Gordon discovers that he blew up Haven, leading to a citywide manhunt. After regaining his memory of the same night the bridges blew, Nygma confronts Cobblepot and learns that Hugo Strange revived him. Strange reveals he implanted a chip in Nygma's brain to mind-control him; Gordon arrives and discovers Nygma's innocence. However, Dorrance reveals that he is the one controlling Nygma and activates the chip, forcing the latter to pursue Gordon. Simultaneously, Selina is declared a hero by the underworld for killing Jeremiah and turns away from Bruce, but Jeremiah awakens elsewhere, having fully recovered from his injuries.
94	6	"13 Stitches"	Ben McKenzie	Seth Boston	February 14, 2019	T40.10056	2.28
Gordon destroys the chip in Nygma's brain, and Lucius surgically removes it. Dorrance and his men take control of the GCPD; Gordon, Bruce, Alfred, Lucius, Nygma, and Barbara work together to broadcast evidence of Dorrance's criminal activities to the press and retake control of the GCPD. Simultaneously, Gordon and Dorrance face off after the latter reveals he has Lee in his custody and that Haven was destroyed to ensure that the military would maintain that the city was beyond saving. Gordon impales Dorrance with a pipe and takes Lee to the GCPD, but Dorrance's superior, Theresa Walker, takes him to Hugo Strange and activates the second chip in Lee's brain, which Gordon manages to destroy as well. Meanwhile, Cobblepot and Selina make a deal to escape from Gotham by working together to track down and kill a thief named Magpie after she steals from the former. Soon after, Alfred is kidnapped by Jeremiah, and Barbara reveals she is pregnant with Gordon's child.
95	7	"Ace Chemicals"	John Stephens	Tze Chun	February 21, 2019	T40.10057	2.13
On the anniversary of the Wayne murders, Jeremiah uses two surgical doppelgangers of Thomas and Martha Wayne to force Bruce to relive his parents' deaths, hoping to become "connected" to him. Bruce and Alfred escape as Jeremiah blows up Wayne Manor, and Selina abandons Cobblepot to assist Bruce. Gordon and Lee discover Jeremiah is developing a toxin at Ace Chemicals, and are hypnotized by the Mad Hatter. Jeremiah kills the doppelganger couple and attempts to execute Gordon and Lee at Crime Alley, but Bruce and Selina rescue them. Jeremiah activates the toxin, forcing Gordon to drive it into the Gotham River; due to the water pollution, the government decides against mainland reunification. After a showdown with Bruce at Ace Chemicals, Jeremiah falls into a chemical vat and is left disfigured and brain-dead. Barbara, for the sake of her unborn child, forms a truce with Cobblepot and Nygma, who plan to escape Gotham on a self-built submarine.
96	8	"Nothing's Shocking"	Kenneth Fink	Seth Boston	February 28, 2019	T40.10061	2.22
As Cobblepot and Nygma work on building the submarine, they are approached by Cobblepot's accountant Arthur Penn, who survived his near-death experience at Haven. However, Penn suffers from a split personality, embodied by the ventriloquist dummy Scarface, leading to a confrontation that results in Penn's death. Bruce and Alfred track down a missing man in the sewers and rescue him from a hybrid-human who was mutated by Jeremiah's chemicals. When two former GCPD officers are murdered by shapeshifting Indian Hill escapee Jane Cartwright, a.k.a. "Jane Doe", Gordon discovers she is linked to Bullock's early years at the GCPD with Dix, his old partner. After Jane kills Dix, Bullock tracks her down and is forced to kill her. A guilt-ridden Bullock then confesses that he and the victims unethically forced Jane to incriminate her mother for killing her abusive father, and Gordon tells him he cannot offer forgiveness.
97	9	"The Trial of Jim Gordon"	Erin Richards	Ben McKenzie	March 7, 2019	T40.10062	2.04
Gordon tries to negotiate a ceasefire between Gotham's gangs but is shot by Zsasz and left comatose. As Lee operates on him, Gordon dreams of himself being on trial for his failures in his life and decisions. Bullock discovers Zsasz was acting under Ivy's influence, as she intends to prevent reunification and rebuild Gotham with her plants. Ivy also hypnotizes Bruce and Lucius into shutting down the river's treatment facility and keeping the water polluted, but Selina frees them and helps stop the shutdown. To get in Gordon's good graces, Barbara blackmails the gang leaders into a ceasefire. Ivy infiltrates the GCPD to kill Gordon but flees after Lee shoots her. In his final hallucination, Gordon decides to live for Lee and his unborn child. A month later, Gordon and Lee are wed by Bullock in the precinct, while Bruce shares a passionate kiss with Selina; disappointed, Barbara hopes to escape Gotham soon alongside Cobblepot and Nygma and keep the baby for herself.
98	10	"I Am Bane"	Kenneth Fink	James Stoteraux & Chad Fiveash	March 21, 2019	T40.10058	2.17
The government approves mainland reunification and sends the military to commence the procedure. However, Dorrance—transformed by the strength-enhancing drug "Venom" and now calling himself Bane—captures Gordon, Bruce, and General Wade. Walker reveals herself as Nyssa al Ghul, the daughter of Ra's al Ghul, and tortures Gordon in front of Bruce as punishment for killing her father. Bane is sent to kill Barbara, who undergoes labor at Lee's clinic. Cobblepot and Nygma are prevented from escaping after Barbara steals the submarine's pressure gauge, forcing them to protect her from Bane before stealing back the gauge. Alfred and Selina fight Bane, who defeats them and badly injures Alfred. As Barbara gives birth to her daughter, Lee convinces her that she does not have to leave Gotham and they can work out raising the baby. However, they are captured by Nyssa. Bruce frees himself and rescues Gordon and Wade, but the latter, now controlled by Strange, orders the military to bomb Gotham.
99	11	"They Did What?"	Carol Banker	Tze Chun	April 18, 2019	T40.10059	2.02
Following the city's bombing, refugees retreat to the GCPD while Bane takes command of the military. Cobblepot and Nygma decide to remain in Gotham and stand with the GCPD against Bane's forces. Selina retrieves Lee, and she and Bruce use one of Jeremiah's recommissioned bombs to destroy Wayne Enterprises' headquarters, slowing the military's advance. Gordon rescues Barbara and the baby from Nyssa, who kills General Wade and escapes Gotham by stealing the submarine. In a final standoff with the GCPD and the refugees, the military turns on Bane, who surrenders. Gotham's reconstruction begins, and Gordon is appointed Commissioner of the GCPD. Realizing she did not give her baby a name throughout the chaos, Barbara decides to name her daughter Barbara Lee Gordon, after the three people she trusts. Elsewhere, Cobblepot and Nygma plan to eventually take over Gotham, and Bruce departs from the city, promising to return.
100	12	"The Beginning..."	Rob Bailey	John Stephens	April 25, 2019	T40.10060	2.19
Ten years later, Bruce returns to Gotham following his extensive travels across the world and his reappearance is publicly announced. Cobblepot is released from Blackgate after a decade in custody, and Gordon wants to retire from the GCPD, though he relents when Nygma, who has been incarcerated at Arkham Asylum for a decade, escapes and kidnaps Mayor James to destroy Wayne Tower at its reopening. However, Nygma is a patsy as they successfully defuse the real bomb. Simultaneously, Cobblepot frees Nygma once again while Bullock frames himself for the murder of the guard who broke Nygma out from prison, though Gordon frees him after learning that Jeremiah Valeska, who has faked brain death, is the true culprit. Bruce, now secretly working as a vigilante in a bat-themed costume, captures Cobblepot and Nygma; after they break out of a prison van, they decide to seek revenge on the vigilante but remain afraid of him. Jeremiah kidnaps Barbara Lee in a showdown with Gordon, though she is rescued by Bruce. Finally, Bruce reconciles with Selina, who has become a cat-themed burglar, and is summoned by Gordon using a police searchlight bearing a bat emblem.

== Production ==
=== Development ===
On May 13, 2018, Fox renewed Gotham for a fifth and final season. While the season was initially given a 10-episode order, this was later increased to 12, thereby making the season finale the series' 100th episode. John Stephens serves as the season's showrunner.

=== Writing ===
The fifth season is shorter than the previous seasons, all of which had 22 episodes each. As a result of this, Stephens said, "We move really quickly [...] We tried to build out the character moments as well. Sometimes we've had so much plot that we had to squeeze out some of the character stuff and now that it's the last chance we have to be with these characters, we're letting them live in these moments." The season is inspired by, and adapts elements from two comic book storylines: Batman: No Man's Land, in which the beleaguered Gotham City is cut off from the rest of the world; and Batman: Zero Year, which focuses on Bruce Wayne / Batman's initial period as a costumed vigilante, and his efforts to stop Edward Nygma / Riddler from taking over Gotham. The No Man's Land arc was planned three years in advance, and the producers intended for it to be an "inspiration", rather than a "religious" adaptation of the comic book storyline. The season features ellipsis and analepsis; the season premiere opens 391 days after the events of the season four finale "No Man's Land", before settling back at 87 days. The final episode jumps 10 years into the future, where Bruce is established as a vigilante.

=== Casting ===
Main cast members Ben McKenzie, Donal Logue, David Mazouz, Morena Baccarin, Sean Pertwee, Robin Lord Taylor, Erin Richards, Camren Bicondova, Cory Michael Smith, Jessica Lucas and Chris Chalk return from previous seasons as James Gordon, Harvey Bullock, Bruce Wayne, Leslie Thompkins, Alfred Pennyworth, Oswald Cobblepot / Penguin, Barbara Kean, Selina Kyle, Edward Nygma / Riddler, Tabitha Galavan, and Lucius Fox. Despite Lucas initially being advertised as a regular for the season, her character was killed off in the season premiere. For the final episode, Lili Simmons replaced Bicondova to portray Selina as an adult.

Benedict Samuel, who played Jervis Tetch / Mad Hatter as a regular in the third season and a guest in the fourth season, returned as a guest in the fifth season. Andrew Sellon, who recurred as Arthur Penn in the fourth season, returned for the fifth season in a guest capacity. He said his character would have become the series' version of the Ventriloquist, but due to the shortened season and pacing reasons, the idea was initially scrapped. After Fox extended the season's episode count from 10 to 12, the creative team were able to continue with their original plan of making Penn the Ventriloquist. Shane West played the recurring role of Gordon's military ally Eduardo Dorrance, written as the series' version of Bane. In October 2018, Jaime Murray was cast in a recurring role as Theresa Walker; it was eventually revealed that her character was actually Nyssa al Ghul.

=== Design ===
John Glaser designed the season's costumes. Stephens compared the Batsuit worn by Bruce Wayne in the season finale to the one seen in the film The Dark Knight Rises (2012) due to being a matte, metallic short-eared battlesuit. Mazouz provided the close up shots and voice for the character, while stunt double Mikhail Mudrik filled in for distant shots to fit with the character's grown-up appearance. Lord Taylor said the season finale would feature Oswald Cobblepot resembling the character as he in the comics. To achieve Cobblepot's fat look, he wore a fatsuit. At Lord Taylor's request, the costume designer consciously avoided making Cobblepot resemble Violet Beauregarde's "blueberry girl" look from Willy Wonka & the Chocolate Factory (1971) and instead went for a "little more monstrous" look, which included depicting the character with a hunch. Additionally, Edward Nygma's season finale Riddler costume was designed to look exactly as in the comics, by having a green color scheme and being filled with question marks throughout. The final episode sees Selina established as a cat burglar; Bicondova said the costume for this episode eschewed the ears seen in most Catwoman costumes in order to look more grounded.

=== Filming ===
The season began production in July 2018. Before the season began filming, Ben McKenzie began growing a moustache to accurately resemble Gordon as seen in the comics. However, since he had only two days to grow the moustache, it was ultimately decided that he sport a fake one. Erin Richards directed "The Trial of Jim Gordon", which was the season's twelfth and final episode to be produced but ninth to air, making her directorial debut on television. Filming for the season ended in December.

== Release ==
The season premiered on January 3, 2019, on Fox in the United States, and ended on April 25, 2019. The season was released on DVD and Blu-ray on June 11, 2019.

== Reception ==
=== Ratings ===
Viewership and ratings per episode of Gotham season 5
No.	Title	Air date	Rating/share (18–49)	Viewers (millions)	DVR (18–49)	DVR viewers (millions)	Total (18–49)	Total viewers (millions)
1	"Year Zero"	January 3, 2019	0.7/3	2.54	0.5	1.67	1.2	4.21
2	"Trespassers"	January 10, 2019	0.7/3	2.38	0.5	1.55	1.2	3.94
3	"Penguin, Our Hero"	January 17, 2019	0.7/3	2.36	0.5	1.53	1.2	3.89
4	"Ruin"	January 24, 2019	0.6/3	2.35	0.6	1.62	1.2	3.97
5	"Pena Dura"	January 31, 2019	0.7/3	2.34	0.5	1.44	1.2	3.78
6	"13 Stitches"	February 14, 2019	0.6/3	2.28	0.5	1.47	1.1	3.75
7	"Ace Chemicals"	February 21, 2019	0.6/3	2.13	0.4	1.33	1.0	3.46
8	"Nothing's Shocking"	February 28, 2019	0.6/3	2.22	0.5	1.42	1.1	3.64
9	"The Trial of Jim Gordon"	March 7, 2019	0.6/3	2.04	0.4	1.30	1.0	3.34
10	"I Am Bane"	March 21, 2019	0.6/3	2.17	0.4	1.32	1.0	3.49
11	"They Did What?"	April 18, 2019	0.6/3	2.02	0.4	1.21	1.0	3.23
12	"The Beginning..."	April 25, 2019	0.5/2	2.19	0.4	1.28	0.9	3.46

=== Critical response ===
The review aggregator website Rotten Tomatoes reported an 85% approval rating with an average rating of 7.17/10 based on 20 reviews. The website's critical consensus reads, "Gotham concludes in a glorious free-for-all that takes full advantage of the series' dense roster of colorful villains, making for an extended climax that is equal parts daffy and thrilling."
