= The Beginning... =

- Gotham episode
- Bruce Wayne in his vigilante costume during the final scene of the episode.
- Episode no.: Season 5 Episode 12
- Directed by: Rob Bailey
- Written by: John Stephens
- Production code: T40.10060
- Original air date: April 25, 2019

Guest appearances
- Cameron Monaghan as Jeremiah Valeska; Kelcy Griffin as Vanessa Harper; Richard Kind as Aubrey James; Francesca Root-Dodson as Ecco; J. W. Cortes as Alvarez; Jeté Laurence as Barbara Lee Gordon; Lili Simmons as Selina Kyle

Episode chronology
← Previous "They Did What?"	Next → —
- Gotham season 5

"The Beginning..." is the series finale of the American television series Gotham, based on the DC Comics characters Jim Gordon and Bruce Wayne. It is the twelfth episode of the fifth season and the 100th overall episode of the series. The episode was written by showrunner John Stephens and directed by Rob Bailey.

Ben McKenzie stars as Gordon, and is joined by principal cast members Donal Logue, David Mazouz, Morena Baccarin, Sean Pertwee, Robin Lord Taylor, Erin Richards, Cory Michael Smith and Chris Chalk. The episode follows Bruce returning to Gotham City after ten years of globetrotting to begin apprehending criminals as a vigilante, while Gordon investigates a plot targeting the city after Harvey Bullock is framed for a murder.

"The Beginning..." was first aired in the United States on Fox on April 25, 2019. It was watched by 2.19 million viewers with a 0.5/2 share among adults aged 18 to 49.

== Plot ==
Bruce Wayne returns to Gotham City after ten years of globetrotting. Police commissioner Jim Gordon plans on retiring. Meanwhile, Oswald Cobblepot is set to be released from Blackgate after a decade, on the same day as the gala celebrating the opening of the new Wayne Tower. Mayor Aubrey James tells Gordon he cannot retire until after the gala.

For the last decade, Edward Nygma has been imprisoned in Arkham, and Jeremiah Valeska is seemingly brain-dead. Two men smuggle Nygma out, while Ecco frees Valeska. While searching for Nygma, Harvey Bullock encounters a guard who hands him a phone. Harvey is shocked by who is on the phone and the guard kills himself. Bullock is framed for the murder, but vehemently claims responsibility regardless; unconvinced, Gordon decides to investigate. Nygma finds a box of C-4 and believes it was left for him by Cobblepot. While investigating Bullock's case, Gordon encounters a vigilante dressed in a bat-themed suit, who tells him he is not his enemy.

Cobblepot tries to kill Gordon for arresting him a decade earlier, but Gordon escapes. At the Wayne Tower gala, Selina Kyle and Barbara Kean thwart Nygma's plot to blow up the tower and Gordon, who upon arriving realizes that there is a second bomb. Leslie Thompkins defuses the bomb, and Gordon realizes that Valeska set up Nygma and framed Bullock.

Nygma and Cobblepot are captured by the vigilante, whom Lucius Fox and Alfred Pennyworth know is Bruce. Valeska kidnaps Gordon and Barbara's daughter Barbara Lee after a scuffle that left Ecco wounded before she was killed by Valeska. Gordon reaches Ace Chemicals, where Valeska reveals he was faking brain death while awaiting Bruce's return. Bruce arrives and subdues Valeska, saving Gordon and Barbara Lee.

Later, Bruce reconnects with Selina and apologizes for leaving her a decade prior. Meanwhile, Cobblepot and Nygma escape the police and plan revenge on the vigilante, even though they fear him. Gordon, who has decided against retirement, re-ignites the searchlight he put atop the Gotham City Police Department headquarters years earlier. (Note: As depicted in the season four episode "No Man's Land".) As he, Bullock and Alfred reminisce about their shared experiences, they notice Bruce watching them from afar. Not recognizing him, Bullock asks who the vigilante is, and Gordon replies, "A friend."

== Production ==
=== Development ===
In April 2019, Fox announced that the twelfth episode of the season would be titled "The Beginning...". The episode, which is the series' 100th and finale, was directed by Rob Bailey, and written by showrunner John Stephens. It is set ten years after the season's previous episode. The episode's title was not meant to convey irony, but the beginning of Bruce Wayne's career as a full-fledged vigilante.

=== Casting ===
Main cast members Ben McKenzie, Donal Logue, David Mazouz, Morena Baccarin, Sean Pertwee, Robin Lord Taylor, Erin Richards, Cory Michael Smith and Chris Chalk return as Jim Gordon, Harvey Bullock, Bruce Wayne, Leslie Thompkins, Alfred Pennyworth, Oswald Cobblepot / Penguin, Barbara Kean, Edward Nygma / Riddler and Lucius Fox. Camren Bicondova decided not to return as Selina Kyle because of her discomfort playing an older version of the character. The guest cast for the episode includes Cameron Monaghan as Jeremiah Valeska, Kelcy Griffin as Vanessa Harper, Richard Kind as Aubrey James, Francesca Root-Dodson as Ecco, J. W. Cortes as Alvarez, Jeté Laurence as Barbara Lee Gordon, and Lili Simmons as Selina.

=== Design ===
Stephens compared the costume worn by Bruce in the episode to the Batsuit seen in the film The Dark Knight Rises (2012) due to being a matte, metallic short-eared battlesuit. Lord Taylor said the episode would feature Cobblepot resembling the character as he did in the comics. To achieve Cobblepot's fat look, he wore a fatsuit. At Lord Taylor's request, the costume designer consciously avoided making Cobblepot resemble Violet Beauregarde's "blueberry girl" look from Willy Wonka & the Chocolate Factory (1971) and instead went for a "little more monstrous" look, which included depicting the character with a hunch. Additionally, Nygma's Riddler costume was designed to look exactly as in the comics, by having a green color scheme and being filled with question marks throughout. The episode sees Selina established as a cat burglar; Bicondova said the costume for this episode eschewed the ears seen in most Catwoman costumes in order to look more grounded.

=== Filming ===
The episode was filmed in November 2018. Before the season began filming, McKenzie began growing a moustache to accurately resemble Gordon as seen in the comics. However, since he had only two days to grow the moustache, it was ultimately decided that he sport a fake one. Mazouz provided the close up shots and voice for Bruce in his costume, while stunt double Mikhail Mudrik filled in for distant shots to fit with the character's grown-up appearance.

== Reception ==
=== Broadcast ===
"The Beginning..." was first aired in the United States on Fox on April 25, 2019. It was watched by 2.19 million viewers with a 0.5/2 share among adults aged 18 to 49.

=== Critical reviews ===
Matt Fowler of IGN gave the episode a rating of 8.3 out of 10, saying, "Gotham's finale works way more than it doesn't, as a time jump allows both a Dark Knight and a Clown Prince to rise." Ben Travers of IndieWire gave the episode a "B" rating, saying, "Gotham always worked as a series you could tune in and out of; it held fast to its purpose as a broadcast drama. But for those who stuck with it, week after week, year after year, the end result is a spellbinding blend of genres, tropes, and characters." Brian Lowry of CNN said the finale "felt more obligatory than soaring, bringing the show to a landing that felt mildly satisfying, but more than anything, overdue."
