= Jerome and Jeremiah Valeska =

Proto-Jokers in the TV series Gotham

- Gotham characters
- Cameron Monaghan as Jerome (left) and Jeremiah (right) on Gotham
- First appearance: Jerome: "The Blind Fortune Teller"; February 16, 2015; Jeremiah: "Mandatory Brunch Meeting"; April 5, 2018
- Last appearance: Jerome: "That Old Corpse"; May 3, 2018; Jeremiah: "The Beginning..."; April 25, 2019
- Created by: Bruno Heller
- Portrayed by: Cameron Monaghan

In-universe information
- Gender: Male
- Occupation: Criminal (both)
- Family: Lila Valeska (mother; deceased); Paul Cicero (father; deceased); Zachary Trumble (uncle; deceased)
- Origin: Gotham City, United States
- Nationality: American

Jerome and Jeremiah Valeska are characters and antagonists in the Fox superhero crime drama television series Gotham and associated media. They are identical twin brothers portrayed by Cameron Monaghan.

Each twin adapts different characteristics of the DC Comics supervillain the Joker. Jerome is depicted as a psychotic nihilist who spreads chaos in Gotham City until his eventual death, while Jeremiah is a cunning psychopath obsessed with tormenting Bruce Wayne. In the series finale set ten years after Jeremiah's first appearance, Jeremiah is reinvented and becomes a figurative amalgamation of both Valeska twins over the course of the show and, while not addressed by name, becomes thematically representative of the Joker, complete with chemical disfiguration he covers with white face paint, dyed green hair, and red lipstick, while dressed in a purple suit with a green undershirt and orange tie, as is the Joker's traditional iconic appearance.

== Early conception ==
At its earliest stages, Gotham was intended to stray from the superhero roots of the Batman comic books, instead opting to be a more grounded police procedural focusing on James Gordon and the origins of Gotham City's inhabitants before the emergence of costumed personas. As such, executive producer Bruno Heller did not want to approach the backstory of Batman's arch-nemesis, the Joker until further into the series (at a point when they were more sure of themselves). Believing that the Joker should not precede Batman himself, one of the earlier ideas was to implant minor characters throughout the first season who could go on to become the supervillain. The first occurrence of this was the cameo of a comedian in the pilot episode. Later into the season, Heller changed his mind and decided to approach the character more directly because he felt that American audiences would not want to wait.

== Development ==
"The Joker didn't think of his shtick all by himself. There must have been someone before who The Joker saw and thought, 'Oh, that's a good shtick. I could work with that and make it better.'"

— Showrunner Bruno Heller

With potential copyright restrictions in mind, the showrunners figured that there may have been characters that existed before the Joker that would have informed his eventual identity. Heller explained that, through the series' run, "people will see how a kind of cultural mien is created... There's a tradition in forebears and ancestors of those characters that went into creating them." He felt that the Joker would not be someone who invented himself out of nothing, and that his origin should be more interesting than an ordinary man falling into a vat of chemicals (a recurring explanation in the comics). Instead, they decided on unraveling a secret history and philosophical ancestry, which Heller likens to Jesus Christ and Elvis Presley. A recurring theme on the show is how the Joker's ideology acts like a virus that can be spread through multiple characters, which executive producer Danny Cannon describes as "the opposite of Bruce Wayne, somebody who just wants to destroy... that could be anyone." The precursors to the character would become known as "proto-Jokers".

The first proto-Joker is a character named Jerome Valeska. While Jerome was only meant to have a one-off appearance in Season 1, the crew was so pleased with Monaghan's performance that they chose to explore the character further. He returned at the beginning of Season 2 but was promptly killed off after a three-episode arc. This was done because Heller thought that audiences would respond negatively if they spent the entire season believing Jerome was the Joker. Executive producer Bryan Wynbrandt added that "Joker's so iconic that it feels like we don't want to get to [him] ever", and because Monaghan personified Jerome in a certain way, "what makes him so exciting is that he's not the Joker. He is Jerome." Following Jerome's death, the showrunners revealed that they were considering a female precursor to the Joker for Season 2. Such a character named Jeri (played by Lori Petty) made an appearance in the episode "This Ball of Mud and Meanness", running a nightclub catering to Jerome's sympathizers. This served as her sole appearance in the series.

Jerome's laugh was briefly inserted into the Season 2 finale to tease Season 3. According to executive producer Ken Woodruff, the third season was meant to not only further elaborate on the Joker's mythology, but also "characters that may or may not be the Joker" or potentially "an amalgamation of what we'll come to know as the Joker." In another three-episode arc, Jerome's growing cult of sympathizers manage to resurrect him, setting the stage for Season 4 in which Jerome plays a much larger role. Monaghan had pitched a storyline at the start of the season, which the showrunners declined but took ideas from. Jerome is killed a second time in the fourth season, shortly after the debut of his twin brother – Jeremiah Valeska (named after Jeremiah Arkham).

"I feel like Cameron's character, in all the iterations of the characters that he played Jerome, Jeremiah, and the new character that he plays, if he's not The Joker, then he's someone who does provide the origin story for the person who you're going to see later on."

— Showrunner John Stephens

According to John Stephens, the showrunners felt they had taken Jerome's character as far as he could go, and they wanted to develop another who would embody a different aspect of Batman's arch-nemesis. They took various characteristics of the Joker and parsed them out, with each individual precursor representing a different element of the Joker. Jeremiah is a civil engineer who becomes a criminal after being sprayed with chemicals by Jerome, causing him to undergo a Joker-like transformation. In the fifth and final season, Jeremiah falls into a vat of chemicals, causing him to undergo another substantial transformation that alters his psyche into becoming what Monaghan describes as a "third character". Stephens explained that he becomes an "amalgam of Jeremiah and Jerome that I think audiences are gonna look at and say, 'If it's not the Joker then it's definitely an antecedent that lives there.'" The series finale leaves it ambiguous as to whether or not Jeremiah will become the Joker.

During the virtual DC FanDome event in 2020, a documentary titled Joker: Put on a Happy Face was made to celebrate the character's 80th anniversary. This documentary includes Jeremiah Valeska from Gotham among the various iterations of the Joker adapted for film and television.

== Characterization ==
"It's not about a man. It's about the ideology of a man and what that represents and how it affects other people."

— Cameron Monaghan, October 2015

=== Jerome Valeska ===
Introduced in Season 1, Jerome Valeska is a nihilist who murders his circus performer mother out of spite. He initially attempts to cover his tracks, but eventually laughs maniacally while admitting his actions to Detective Jim Gordon (Ben McKenzie) and medical examiner Leslie Thompkins (Morena Baccarin). He is consequently sent to Arkham Asylum. When Monaghan was cast as Jerome, he avoided drawing inspiration from the actors who had played the Joker throughout the various Batman films. However, he did take inspiration from Mark Hamill's vocal performance in the DC Animated Universe, in addition to reading as many comics featuring the character as he could to prepare for the role.

Jerome returns at the beginning of Season 2, leading a team of Arkham escapees under the guidance of corrupt politician Theo Galavan (James Frain), who wants to spread fear in his plan to become mayor. Galavan serves as a mentor and father figure to Jerome, shaping his viewpoint of the world as a performance stage for evil. This stops Jerome from limiting himself to smaller-scale acts of crime. During his reign of terror, Jerome murders GCPD captain Sarah Essen (Zabryna Guevara) and his own father, Paul Cicero (Mark Margolis). He is betrayed and killed by Galavan in the third episode, during which various characters observe his actions and begin imitating his laughter.

Jerome is resurrected by a cult of followers in Season 3, and once again escapes incarceration and gathers a team of supervillains to spread chaos in Gotham City in Season 4. Before falling to his death, Jerome warns Gordon that others would follow in his footsteps.

=== Jeremiah Valeska ===
Introduced in Season 4 under the name Xander Wilde, Jeremiah is revealed to have been a child prodigy who was sent away by his mother after suffering severe abuse at Jerome's hands. Jerome, however, maintains that Jeremiah manipulated their family into turning against him. Jeremiah admits to Jerome that he may have exaggerated the abuse, but the show maintains ambiguity regarding which brother is being more truthful. Jeremiah is exposed to a variation of the Scarecrow's (Charlie Tahan) fear gas, which turns his skin chalk white and lips bright red, and he becomes a major antagonist in the series going forward.

In contrast to his brash and chaotic twin brother, Jeremiah is a calm and calculating psychopath akin to Hannibal Lecter. Monaghan described Jerome as the "chainsaw" and Jeremiah as the "scalpel". Jeremiah has rejected the notion that he is insane, believing himself to be vastly more intelligent than his brother, which the actor has opined makes him irredeemable. He is obsessed with Bruce Wayne, whom he sees as a surrogate brother. Jeremiah's torture of Alfred Pennyworth (Sean Pertwee) and crippling of Selina Kyle (Camren Bicondova) to torment Bruce are reminiscent of the Joker's defining actions in the graphic novel, Batman: The Killing Joke.

In Season 5, Jeremiah grows more unhinged after Gotham becomes an isolated ruin, with Monaghan taking inspiration from David Bowie and Tim Curry in his performance. He becomes a boogeyman figure and revels in his infamy, but is unsatisfied because he failed to bond with Bruce. Jeremiah concludes that Bruce is defined by the trauma of his parents' murder, and so he creates duplicates of Bruce's parents to force him to relive his trauma so that he and Bruce can be bonded as hated enemies. This plan ultimately fails and Jeremiah falls into an experimental vat at the Ace Chemicals plant, referencing the Joker's most common origin story in the comics.

Another feature of the Joker displayed in the Jeremiah character was that of a clown-like female accomplice akin to the Batman character Harley Quinn. Ecco (Francesca Root-Dodson) is Jeremiah's psychotic, utterly devoted henchwoman and the leader of the cult that worships him after Gotham becomes isolated from the rest of the world. In the series finale, Jeremiah shoots Ecco dead, remarking that "I suppose there are other fish in the sea", which some critics speculated would pave the way for Quinn in the series' continuity, who had previously cameoed in the third season finale, portrayed by Meggie Vilcina.

The final iteration of Jeremiah in the series finale is the coalescence of all the Joker traits previously seen in the series with additional characteristics. According to Stephens, "When you look at the Joker and you cleave off certain character traits, some of those character traits we gave to Jerome. Some to Jeremiah. But, there were still some leftover character traits that we said, we haven't used these elements yet. Specifically to me, horror or terror". He is more insane than Jerome, with Stephens referring to him as a "nightmare".

== Reception ==
On review aggregator website Rotten Tomatoes, "The Blind Fortune Teller" holds an approval rating of 52% based on a total of 25 critical reviews. The critics consensus refers to Jerome's debut as a "disappointing introduction of an iconic Batman villain." IGN reviewer Matt Fowler admired Monaghan's performance, but stated that he would be unsatisfied if Jerome was the Joker because of the lack of a true origin story, "I've always liked the idea that the Joker was a do-right nobody who sadly lost his mind due to the horrors he witnessed and/or endured. Jerome is already out of his mind. The next step on his journey would be him shopping for hair dye." Screen Crush was heavily critical of both the show itself and Jerome's introduction, referring to it as a cheap selling point without any context intended to make the audience forget that Gotham is "absolute garbage television". However, he conceded that Monaghan gave an effective performance in the role. Kyle Fowle of The A.V. Club opined that, although Monaghan gave a great performance, Jerome embodied the show's flaw of ignoring set-ups and established plotlines in favor of introducing new characters and big 'reveals'.

In contrast, Rob Bricken of Gizmodo felt that Monaghan did a solid Joker impersonation, referring to Jerome as an amalgam of the Jack Nicholson and Heath Ledger versions of the character. He speculated that the actor was cast for his Joker-like smile. Screen Rant's Anthony Ocasio referred to the Jerome reveal as "the best scene the series may ever see" and stated that the show surprisingly succeeded in referencing the Joker, even though it felt out of sync with the grounded tone of previous episodes. Rolling Stone's Sean Collins praised Jerome's introduction and felt that the lack of an origin story was fitting because of the Joker's mysterious past in the comics. However, he was apprehensive about Jerome Valeska being a red herring for the Joker, likening it to "genre television's post-Lost fixation on mystery over meaning."

Jerome's inclusion in later seasons was generally more well-received. IGN stated that Jerome was "a bright spot of the series in Season 2". Kyle Fowle, who criticised Season 1 for not establishing a consistent tone or direction, felt that the second season rectified this by putting a bigger emphasis on the villains. He commended the series for bringing back Monaghan, calling his reprisal "delightfully twisted and fun." The Observer found Jerome's appearances in Season 2 to be a major improvement over his debut episode and found him to be a fun character, but also noted a lack of originality in Monaghan's performance compared to the earlier film and television adaptations of the Joker. According to Screen Rant, Monaghan's recycling elements from earlier Joker actors was fun to watch, adding "Gotham may do well to simply establish that Jerome is Joker, since at this point the character is likely among fans' favorite new additions to the show." Vulture was less forgiving of the homages, slamming the character for unoriginality and an over-reliance on fan service.

Monaghan's performance as Jerome has been cited as a fan favorite by entertainment journalists, also receiving praise from Hamill. ComicBook.com stated that the character was an instant hit with fans. According to Cinema Blend, Jerome's demise in Season 2 was a disappointment for fans and his later announced resurrection was highly anticipated. Critical response was also negative, with the Rotten Tomatoes consensus for the episode (based on 18 critical reviews) referring to the death as unearned. Entertainment Weekly called it both a smart and stupid move for the series; stupid because Jerome is "one of its most fascinating villains — no one has played a character quite like Cameron Monaghan captured the essence of Jerome" and smart because it established firmly that Jerome is not the Joker. Fowle was troubled that the show was willing to get rid of what he felt was the show's most compelling character so quickly. However, some critics were more positive, admiring the scene for subverting expectations.

Comic Book Resources opined that the reveal of Jeremiah Valeska was "both crazy and brilliant", because it made perfect sense for the show's universe and it allowed the actor to stay on the show after Jerome's arc had concluded. Screen Rant ranked Jeremiah as a better villain than Jerome for being more methodical and obsessive, and for his major feats in the series. Den of Geek's Marc Buxton drew parallels between Jeremiah and the Batman: The Killing Joke and The Dark Knight Returns versions of the Joker, and found the character's narcissism compelling. He thought that the first confrontation between Bruce and Jeremiah in "One Bad Day" did a good job of foreshadowing the eventual Batman/Joker relationship. Paste Magazine ranked the character among the best villains of the series. Fowler found the introduction of Jeremiah to be pointless, because he believed that Jerome would have served as a perfect Joker for the series, and because the show wasted the opportunity to introduce a more mysterious or tragic candidate for the Joker.

== See also ==
- List of Gotham characters
- Joker in other media
  - Joker (The Dark Knight)
  - Joker (Jack Napier)
- Marquis Jet
