= Oswald Cobblepot (Gotham) =

Fictional character on Gotham

Oswald Cobblepot Penguin
- Gotham character
- Robin Lord Taylor as Oswald Cobblepot in a promotional image for the TV series Gotham.
- First appearance: "Pilot"; September 22, 2014
- Last appearance: "The Beginning..."; April 25, 2019
- Based on: Penguin by: Bob Kane; and Bill Finger
- Adapted by: Bruno Heller
- Portrayed by: Robin Lord Taylor

In-universe information
- Full name: Oswald Chesterfield Cobblepot (born Kapelput)
- Nicknames: The Penguin; Ozzie; Pengy
- Gender: Male
- Title: The King of Gotham
- Occupation: Professional criminal; Club owner; Mayor of Gotham City (formerly)
- Family: Gertrud Kapelput (mother)† Elijah Van Dahl (father)† Grace Van Dahl (stepmother)† Charles Van Dahl (stepbrother)† Sasha Van Dahl (stepsister)†
- Nationality: American
- Age: 35 (season 5); 45 (season 5's finale scene)

Oswald Cobblepot (née: Kapelput; cryptonym: The Penguin) is a character and one of the main antagonists of the FOX television series Gotham, portrayed by Robin Lord Taylor. Based on the DC Comics supervillain of the same name, he was adapted by showrunner Bruno Heller for the series, which is intended to explore the origin stories of characters from the Batman mythos. Introduced in the first season, Cobblepot is depicted as an intelligent low-level criminal who aspires to rule Gotham City's criminal underworld. His character arc in the series explores his rise to power.

Taylor's performance has been well received by critics and fans throughout the series' run, and the Penguin has been considered the show's breakout character.

== Development ==
Gotham marks the third live-action portrayal of the Penguin. Burgess Meredith and Danny DeVito previously portrayed the character in the 1960s Batman television series and in Tim Burton's 1992 film Batman Returns, respectively. Robin Lord Taylor took inspiration from DeVito's interpretation for his portrayal.

== Fictional character biography ==
Oswald Cobblepot is a cunning, ruthless criminal who wants to rule Gotham's criminal underworld, and is willing – and often eager – to kill anyone who stands in his way. Nevertheless, he is patient, methodical and Machiavellian, using his sharp intellect to concoct intricate plans in which his every move is premeditated toward achieving a given end. His last name is an anglicization of "Kapelput"; his mother, Gertrud Kapelput (Carol Kane), is an immigrant from Austria-Hungary. He is very close to his mother, whom he considers the only person in the world who loves him.

This is the first version of the character who had queer implications; he has complicated feelings for fellow criminal and best friend Edward Nygma (Cory Michael Smith). However Taylor, who is gay, has said that he does not consider the character to be explicitly homosexual or bisexual, and that Cobblepot's feelings for Nygma constitute "a romantic, yearning need to connect with somebody" rather than strictly sexual interest. Taylor has further stated he does not personally view Cobblepot as a representative for any sexual identity.

=== Season 1 ===
Cobblepot starts out as a small-time criminal working for mobster Fish Mooney (Jada Pinkett Smith). After Mooney discovers that Cobblepot is an informant for the Gotham City Police Department (GCPD), she hobbles him by breaking his ankle, leaving him with a waddle-like limp that befits his hated nickname, "Penguin". Mooney and her boss, Mafia don Carmine Falcone (John Doman), order GCPD detectives Jim Gordon (Ben McKenzie) and Harvey Bullock (Donal Logue) to execute Cobblepot, but Gordon lets him go. Cobblepot allies himself with Falcone and rival mob boss Sal Maroni (David Zayas), and climbs his way up the ladder of Gotham's criminal underworld through murder and treachery. He also instigates a mob war at the end of season one in which Maroni and Mooney are killed and Falcone is forced to leave town, leaving Cobblepot "the King of Gotham".

=== Season 2 ===
Cobblepot now controls all aspects of the city's crime. However, he is forced to help corrupt billionaire Theo Galavan (James Frain) in his campaign for mayor when Galavan's sister, Tabitha (Jessica Lucas), kidnaps Cobblepot's mother. Cobblepot obeys Galavan's orders to murder the rival candidates, but Tabitha kills Gertrud anyway. A heartbroken Cobblepot swears revenge and dedicates himself to destroying Galavan. He eventually succeeds in unraveling Galavan's criminal empire with help from Gordon, and he gets his revenge when he and Gordon kill Galavan together.

Cobblepot is arrested for killing Galavan and sent to Arkham Asylum, where head psychiatrist Hugo Strange (B.D. Wong) subjects him to a series of psychological tortures that render him timid and harmless. After his release, he meets his wealthy biological father, Elijah Van Dahl (Paul Reubens, who also portrayed the Penguin's father in the 1992 film Batman Returns), who takes him into his family. Van Dahl's wife Grace (Melinda Clarke) and stepchildren are plotting to kill him and inherit his fortune, and use Cobblepot in their schemes. After they kill Elijah, they make Cobblepot their servant. When he discovers what they have done, his conditioning wears off and he becomes his old self again. Angered by the loss of his father, he takes brutal revenge: he slaughters his stepsiblings and cooks them into a pot roast, feeding them to Grace before killing her as well. As Van Dahl's only living relative, Cobblepot inherits his father's fortune.

Upon learning that the vigilante Azrael is the recently resurrected Theo Galavan, Cobblepot and his henchman Butch Gilzean (Drew Powell) kill him with a missile launcher. After Arkham is overrun with Strange's mutated "experiments", Cobblepot arrives there to kill Strange – only to find that the doctor has also revived Fish Mooney.

=== Season 3 ===
Six months later, Cobblepot leads an angry mob against Mooney and Strange's creations. He spares Mooney after she says she is proud of what he has become, and tells her to leave Gotham and never come back. He is hailed a hero for defeating Mooney, and makes a successful run for mayor with help from Edward Nygma, towards whom he develops ambiguous feelings. When Nygma enters a relationship with a woman named Isabella (Chelsea Spack), Cobblepot has her killed. When Nygma discovers what Cobblepot has done, he embarks on a campaign of revenge, ultimately causing Cobblepot to lose his mayoralty. Nygma then brings Cobblepot to the harbor docks, where he shoots his former friend in the stomach and pushes his body into the harbor.

Cobblepot is later found and healed by Ivy Pepper (Maggie Geha), and forms a partnership with her in order to kill Nygma and combat gangster Barbara Kean (Erin Richards), who has taken over Gotham in his absence. They recruit Victor Fries (Nathan Darrow) and Bridgit Pike (Michelle Veintimilla) as muscle, and help Gordon stop the Court of Owls from using a weaponized virus on the city. Mooney is fatally wounded during a showdown between Cobblepot and Kean's forces, and with her dying words tells Cobblepot to make Gotham his or "burn it to the ground".

The GCPD makes a deal with Nygma to entrap Cobblepot, but the plan fails when Kean, Tabitha and Gilzean show up to fight; Cobblepot escapes while the two sides fight each other. Cobblepot takes Nygma to the same docks where he shot him, and has Fries encase him in a block of ice; Cobblepot wants to keep him as a reminder to never again let feelings weaken him. Later, Cobblepot and Ivy work on their plans for the Iceberg Lounge, with Cobblepot intending to use the frozen Nygma as the centerpiece.

=== Season 4 ===
Three months later, Cobblepot announces that no one can commit crimes in Gotham without a "license" from him; corrupt mayor Aubrey James (Richard Kind) sanctions the scheme to keep crime down, and in return Cobblepot keeps the majority of the profits of any crime he permits. The GCPD reluctantly goes along with it – except for Gordon, who pledges that he will arrest any criminal he finds, and eventually Cobblepot himself.

One night, Cobblepot discovers that Nygma is gone from his ice prison and orders his personal assassin, Victor Zsasz (Anthony Carrigan), to find him. Nygma sends Cobblepot a series of riddles to make him guess his location. When Cobblepot does not show up at the location mentioned in the riddle (Stoker's Cemetery), he tells Nygma that he has lost his edge, and is no longer worthy of his attention. However, he changes his mind when he finds out that Nygma is making fun of him at a club in the Narrows as part of a wrestling act with Gilzean – who was killed months before and is now reborn as Solomon Grundy.

Meanwhile, Cobblepot forms a tenuous alliance with Carmine Falcone's daughter, Sofia (Crystal Reed). Together, they open an orphanage, and he befriends one of the orphans, a mute boy named Martin (Christopher Convery). He teaches the boy about the finer points of revenge and sabotage, and has him spy on Sofia, who he does not know how to trust. Martin later informs him that he saw Gordon and Sofia kissing, and Cobblepot realizes that she has been manipulating him. She arranges a meeting with him with Kean, Tabitha and Selina Kyle (Camren Bicondova) in tow and threatens to kill Martin unless he surrenders his territory. He fakes Martin's death to keep him safe, and declares war on Sofia. Cobblepot reveals Sofia's plotting to her father, who decides to send her away; moments later, however, Don Falcone is shot dead by men working for Sofia. Zsasz, believing that Cobblepot ordered the hit on his mentor, implicates him in Martin's apparent death, for which he is arrested and sent to Arkham. Psychopathic criminal Jerome Valeska (Cameron Monaghan), who is in the cell next to his, makes his life miserable by subjecting him to beatings and humiliation.

Six weeks later, Cobblepot receives a visit from Nygma, who leaves him with a riddle; he realizes that Nygma is still the "Riddler" deep down inside, and can help him escape. He then stands up to Jerome and beats him to a pulp, winning the lunatic's respect; Jerome agrees to deliver a letter from Cobblepot to Nygma and offers to take him into his gang. When Nygma visits once again, Cobblepot tells him to read the first word of each sentence of the letter, which is asking The Riddler to bring Nygma to Arkham so that Cobblepot can set the former free. Nygma's "Riddler" persona takes over, and breaks Cobblepot out of Arkham.

Cobblepot and Nygma visit Leslie Thompkins (Morena Baccarin), who is now in charge of the Narrows. Thompkins and Nygma concoct a plan to take down Sofia, which a horrified Cobblepot discovers involves Fries encasing him in a block of ice and delivering him to Sofia. Sometime later, a timer Fries planted on him goes off and melts the ice; upon being thawed out, Cobblepot tortures Sofia's underling The Dentist (D. Baron Buddy Bolton) until he tells him where Sofia's thugs have taken Nygma. He finds them at the pier where Nygma shot him, and saves Nygma's life by shooting the thugs dead; they then reconcile as friends. Cobblepot joins forces with Jerome's "Legion of Horribles", along with Fries, Pike, Jervis Tetch (Benedict Samuel) and Jonathan Crane (Charlie Tahan), and manages to recruit Butch with the promise of helping to find Strange to cure him. However, when he learns that Jerome intends to poison the city with lethal laughing gas, he goes to Gordon behind Jerome's back, asking for protection. When Jerome learns of Cobblepot's treachery, he has Tetch and Crane imprison him in a blimp that contains the laughing gas, set to kill thousands of people. Cobblepot overpowers the hypnotized pilot and flies the blimp out of the city toward a nearby river.

Following Jerome's death, Cobblepot joins forces with Gilzean, Tabitha Galavan and Kean to stop Ra's al-Ghul (Alexander Siddig) and Jerome's brother Jeremiah (Monaghan) from destroying Gotham with a cluster of bombs, in hopes of collecting a reward from the city and getting clemency for their crimes. Jeremiah gets the better of them, however, forcing the unlikely allies to attack Ra's directly. Meanwhile, Cobblepot persuades Strange to cure Gilzean – only to shoot him dead in front of Tabitha as revenge for Tabitha killing his mother. When Gotham is evacuated following the bombs' explosion, Cobblepot carves out his own territory from the abandoned city.

=== Season 5 ===
Months later, Cobblepot has become the de facto ruler of Gotham by killing anyone in the other gangs who poses the slightest threat to his power. He also avenges his mother's death when he stabs Tabitha in the heart with a bowie knife, thus igniting a feud with Kean, Tabitha's best friend.

Later, Penguin forms an alliance with Selina Kyle in order to defeat jewel thief Magpie (Sarah Schenkkan), who had stolen a precious diamond from Cobblepot. When Jeremiah's chemicals contaminate the water in the city's river, reunifaction with the mainland is deemed unlikely. Cobblepot and Nygma devise a plan to leave Gotham forever in a submarine. They make a deal with Kean and allow her to come with them.

While Cobblepot and Nygma start to build the submarine, they are approached by Cobblepot's former accountant Arthur Penn (Andrew Sellon), who survived the attack at Haven and now suffers from a split personality. Penguin and Riddler learn that Penn is now controlled by the ventriloquist dummy Scarface, who wants to take control of Cobblepot's empire and the submarine. Nygma and Cobblepot combine their forces to defeat Arthur and Scarface.

When Bane (Shane West) and Nyssa al Ghul (Jaime Murray) manipulate the U.S. Army into issuing an extermination order on the citizens of Gotham, Cobblepot cannot bring himself to let Gotham be destroyed, however, and so he and Nygma agree to help Gordon defeat Bane and Nyssa. In the ensuing firefight, Cobblepot loses his right eye when a grenade explodes in front of him, which he covers with a glass eye and a monocle. He and Nygma help save the city, but lose the money and power they had amassed, so they resolve to work together to once again take control of Gotham.

Ten years later, Cobblepot is released from Blackgate Penitentiary, having been imprisoned there six months after helping save Gotham. He now appears more similar to his comic book counterpart with a frock coat, a cravat, a waistcoat, an opera hat, and a slightly overweight stature. He kidnaps Gordon, now the GCPD Commissioner, and tries to kill him as revenge for locking him up, but Gordon escapes. Cobblepot then reunites with Nygma, who has recently escaped from Arkham. The two of them plan to resume their reign of crime, but are unexpectedly captured and tied up by a mysterious vigilante dressed as a bat, who unbeknownst to them is really Bruce Wayne (David Mazouz). However, they escape and resolve to fight this new adversary together, even though they fear him.

== Reception ==
Robin Lord Taylor has received critical acclaim for his performance as Oswald Cobblepot, with the character being cited as the show's breakout character. Danny DeVito, who portrayed the Penguin in the second Tim Burton Batman film Batman Returns, also praised Taylor's performance, saying, "I think he's a very good young Penguin. He's a terrific actor."

== See also ==
- List of Gotham characters
- Penguin in other media
