= Selina Kyle (Gotham character) =

Fictional character on Gotham

- Gotham character
- Camren Bicondova as Selina Kyle in Gotham
- First appearance: "Pilot"; September 22, 2014
- Last appearance: "The Beginning..."; April 25, 2019
- Based on: Catwoman by: Bob Kane; Bill Finger
- Adapted by: Bruno Heller
- Portrayed by: Camren Bicondova (seasons 1–5; teen); Lili Simmons (series finale; adult)

In-universe information
- Full name: Selina Kyle
- Nickname: Cat
- Gender: Female
- Occupation: Thief; Vigilante; Nightclub owner (temporarily)
- Family: Maria Kyle (mother)
- Significant other: Bruce Wayne
- Nationality: American

Selina Kyle, nicknamed "Cat", is a fictional character on the Fox TV series Gotham. Based on the DC Comics character of the same name who goes on to become Catwoman, Selina is a morally ambiguous street thief who becomes an ally and later love interest to Bruce Wayne, the orphaned son of Thomas and Martha Wayne. Camren Bicondova portrays Selina Kyle for the majority of Gotham's run, but is replaced by Lili Simmons as an adult in the series finale.

== Character development ==
"The main word that I can think of to characterize Selina is that she's just surviving. She's very mischievous and very challenging to play at times, because she feels emotions but she hides them. I realized that she isn't just a street thief and a survivor; she's actually a normal girl."

— Camren Bicondova

Gotham depicts the origins of Batman, with the series starting with the murder of Bruce Wayne's parents, as well as that of notable allies and foes such as James Gordon, Alfred Pennyworth, Lucius Fox, Leslie Thompkins, Penguin, Riddler, Poison Ivy and The Joker. Catwoman has been considered a morally ambiguous character, initially being counted as one of Batman's foes but becoming an occasional ally in later comic storylines, developing an iconic love–hate relationship, as she is also Batman's most enduring love interest.

Actress and dancer Camren Bicondova was cast to portray the teenaged Selina. Bicondova auditioned for a random role named "Lucy" and did not find out what the real role was until after she was selected. While she took inspiration from previous Catwoman actresses Michelle Pfeiffer, Anne Hathaway and others, Bicondova wanted to portray a side of Selina Kyle not seen before, focusing on her past. As the series finale jumped ten years into the future from the rest of the series, Bicondova did not feel comfortable portraying her character as an adult, and at her request, an older actress was chosen to portray the adult Selina Kyle. Warner Bros. Television cast Lili Simmons in the role, with Simmons and Bicondova collaborating closely on the adult Selina's characterization.

== Fictional character biography ==
=== Season 1 ===
Selina Kyle is introduced as a 13-year-old street orphan and skilled thief. In the pilot episode, she personally witnesses the murders of Thomas and Martha Wayne. She forms a tenuous alliance with GCPD Detective Jim Gordon after he saves her from kidnappers working for the Dollmaker. She promises to help him solve the Wayne murders if he helps her get out of trouble with the law. Gordon has her temporarily housed at Wayne Manor, which leads to her befriending the Waynes' son, Bruce. She saves him from a gang of hired killers and gives him his first kiss. She also helps Bruce find Reggie Payne, the man who stabbed Bruce's butler Alfred Pennyworth, pushing Payne out of a window to his death to prevent him from telling the people who hired him that she and Bruce are onto them. Selina also has connections with Ivy Pepper and later befriends Barbara Kean, Gordon's ex-fiance. During the gang war between Carmine Falcone and Sal Maroni, Selina is among the street children recruited into Fish Mooney's gang. When a gang war erupts between Oswald Cobblepot and Mooney for the control of Gotham's underworld, Selina declines to pick a side and slips away during the conflict.

=== Season 2 ===
Selina later re-emerges working for Cobblepot's gang and tries to protect Bruce from corrupt billionaire Theo Galavan (James Frain) and his niece, Silver St. Cloud (Natalie Alyn Lind), who competes with Selina for Bruce's affections. Later, Bruce and Selina stage a kidnapping to find out what Silver knows about the Wayne murders. She teams up with Gordon and Cobblepot to save Bruce when he is kidnapped by the Sacred Order of Saint Dumas. She allows Bruce to live on the streets with her for a while and tries to teach him how to fight. When Bruce decides to go back home, Selina angrily spurns his friendship. Selina later volunteers to infiltrate Arkham Asylum to find Hugo Strange's (B.D. Wong) experiments. She also meets Bridgit Pike (Michelle Veintimilla), the alter ego of the vigilante Firefly, and becomes her ally in fighting human traffickers. In the season finale, Selina helps Bruce and Lucius Fox (Chris Chalk) infiltrate Arkham and save Gordon from Edward Nygma (Cory Michael Smith).

=== Season 3 ===
When Strange uses experimental technology to revive Fish Mooney, Selina once again goes to work for her. When one of Mooney's minions catches Ivy stealing from her, Selina tries to save her, but is helpless to stop Mooney's thugs from pushing Ivy into a vat of toxic waste.

Later on, Selina encounters Subject 514A (Mazouz), a clone of Bruce created by Strange. After 514A saves Selina during a robbery gone wrong, she sees his scars and realizes he isn't Bruce. 514A explains the situation, and Selina tells him he is more normal than Bruce. With that, 514A kisses Selina and the two part ways. Later, while Selina is stealing wallets at the Cobblepot's party, she encounters Ivy (Maggie Geha), who reveals that Marv (Victor Pagan), one of Mooney's minions, aged her and gave her the power to make plants do her bidding.

After Bruce confesses his feelings for her, Selina kisses him. She tries to help Bruce and Alfred break into a building owned by the Court of Owls, assisted by Selina's long-lost mother, Maria (Ivana Milicevic). Although Maria seems to want to reconnect with her daughter, Selina later discovers that she only returned to extort money from Bruce. Selina then tearfully tells her mother to leave Gotham and never return. Selina gets angry at Bruce once she finds out he kept the truth about her mother from her, and breaks up with him.

514A attempts to get Selina to leave Gotham with him, but she says that he will never be the man Bruce is and that she doesn't care about him. She attempts to warn Alfred, but 514A pushes her out a window. However, a herd of cats revive her, and she is taken to the hospital, where Ivy helps heal her. She comes back to Wayne Manor to kill 514A, but Alfred stops her and throws her out. She allies herself with Ivy and Cobblepot, but is captured by Barbara, Nygma and Tabitha Galavan (Jessica Lucas). She negotiates her way out by betraying Cobblepot, protecting Ivy, and getting money to leave Gotham. After her relationship with Bruce is further strained during the chaos caused by Jervis Tetch's (Benedict Samuel) "Alice" virus, Selina meets up with Tabitha looking for employment, which Tabitha gives her after testing her talents with a whip. Selina tells Tabitha that she is "done just surviving".

=== Season 4 ===
Eventually, Selina and Tabitha work for a revived Barbara Kean, even when Barbara aligns herself with Sofia Falcone (Crystal Reed). The Falcone family's hitman, Victor Zsasz (Anthony Carrigan), offers Selina and Tabitha the opportunity to enter Cobblepot's licensed crime system. After Tabitha refuses, Selina goes in alone. At Cobblepot's club, the relationship between Bruce and Selina rekindles, as Bruce apologizes for his previous behavior. They later encounter each other anonymously, both dressed as their vigilante personas. Selina is working for Barbara and Tabitha; she has to steal an ancient, mystical knife from Cobblepot's cargo, while Bruce is trying to make sure the knife doesn't fall into Ra's al Ghul's (Alexander Siddig) hands. When Bruce is spotted by Cobblepot's goons, they open fire and he has to fight his way out while Selina goes back to the Siren's club empty-handed. Bruce later buys the knife at auction and Selina asks him to give it to her, but he refuses and tells her to leave. When Barbara wants to shut the Sirens down, Selina proves her worth to them by going on her own to steal from the bikers' gang. The Sirens later oppose Cobblepot after being tasked to capture Nygma for him. The Sirens then capture Sofia as an asset against Cobblepot, then end up working for her to bring him down, sending him to Arkham and taking over his empire.

Bruce and Selina meet again later in the season at the Siren's Club, where Bruce is drinking and partying to numb his guilt over killing Ra's. Eventually, Bruce asks Selina for help, but she is on her way to stop Ivy from murdering innocent people and tells him to atone for his actions, especially regarding his behavior towards Alfred. During the second half of the season, Selina is torn between her loyalty to the Sirens and her feelings for Bruce, which causes friction between the three parties. Eventually, Selina helps Bruce fight other villains like Jerome Valeska (Cameron Monaghan), a resurrected Ra's Al Ghul, and Jonathan Crane (Charlie Tahan). Bruce is sprayed by Crane's fear toxin, but Selina is able to reach him. They share a kiss back at Wayne Manor seconds before she is shot and paralyzed by Jerome's brother Jeremiah (Monaghan). After Jeremiah and Ra's destroy Gotham City's bridges to the outside world, turning the city into a no man's land, Bruce tells Alfred to take Selina to Gotham's last remaining hospital and oversee her recovery.

=== Season 5 ===
Months later, Selina has undergone an operation to keep her spine from collapsing, but she remains paralyzed. She tries to commit suicide, but her doctors stop her. Bruce takes the advice of a nurse to seek out "the witch" as he asks where to find her. The witch turns out to be Ivy, who reluctantly gives Bruce a strange boil to cure Selina. Once the boil is administered, Selina regains the ability to walk, as well as new, quasi-feline powers. Suffering from PTSD episodes, Selina decides to get revenge on Jeremiah by stabbing him in the chest. Later, Cobblepot comes to her for help in defeating jewel thief Magpie, and the two of them plan to leave Gotham forever.

Bruce and Selina share a surprise date where he expresses his intention to leave Gotham, which saddens her. Ivy walks in, hypnotizing Bruce and leaves Selina in the middle of a fight. Selina gets out and finds Bruce and they both violently fight each other. She manages to snap him out of it by hitting him and tearfully admitting that she doesn't want him to leave. Bruce takes Selina as his date to Gordon and Leslie Thompkins' wedding, and kisses her. However, Bruce eventually decides to leave Gotham in order to train himself to fight crime, leaving a heartbroken Selina a note wishing her well and promising to one day return.

Ten years later, Selina has become a jewel thief and is being shadowed by a mysterious masked vigilante resembling a bat. Selina attends the opening of the new Wayne Tower and joins Barbara, Thompkins and Gordon in stopping Nygma and Jeremiah from destroying it. The vigilante – who she recognizes as Bruce – later tells her that he left Gotham City in order to protect her. She replies that she wanted him, not his protection. The two reconcile, but before leaving, Bruce tells Selina to return a diamond she had stolen; in response, she mutters "like hell".

== See also ==
- List of Gotham characters
- Catwoman in other media
