= Festival of the Living Dead =

2024 zombie film

- Promotional release poster
- Directed by: Jen and Sylvia Soska
- Written by: Miriam Lyapin; Helen Marsh
- Produced by: Tara Cowell-Plain; Jack Nasser; Jacob Nasser; Kimberley Wakefield
- Starring: Ashley Moore; Camren Bicondova
- Cinematography: Tony Mirza
- Edited by: David Trevail
- Music by: Rich Walters
- Production company: Enlighten Content
- Distributed by: Tubi
- Release date: April 5, 2024
- Country: United States
- Language: English

Festival of the Living Dead is a 2024 American zombie film directed by Jen and Sylvia Soska and starring Ashley Moore and Camren Bicondova. It is a spiritual sequel to George A. Romero's Night of the Living Dead.

== Plot ==
Ash Conner, granddaughter of Ben from Night of the Living Dead, celebrates her birthday with best friend Iris, boyfriend Kevin, and a group of friends. Kevin surprises Ash with tickets to the infamous Festival of the Living Dead, but she initially declines due to babysitting her younger brother, Luke. Iris volunteers to watch him, allowing the group to attend. At the festival, after a hit-and-run incident at a staff entrance, they discover the victim was a zombie. The infection spreads rapidly, turning the festival into a bloodbath.

Back home, Iris and her friend Blaze notice disturbing festival footage online and decide to sneak in with Luke. Meanwhile, Ash and her friends encounter chaos and unheeded warnings as zombies overrun the venue. The group struggles to survive, facing betrayals, gruesome deaths, and moral dilemmas.

Ty, increasingly unstable, threatens the group, culminating in a deadly standoff. Blaze and Luke narrowly escape an ambush by covering themselves in zombie blood. Ash and Iris reunite amidst flaming destruction, and Blaze sacrifices himself during the military’s bombing raid. Luke ultimately kills Ty to protect himself. The story ends as Ash, Iris, and Luke drive away, survivors of the undead nightmare.

== Cast ==
- Ashley Moore as Ash
- Camren Bicondova as Iris
- Gage Marsh as Kevin
- Maia Jae Bastidas as Lindsey
- Andre Anthony as Ty
- Keana Lyn Bastidas as Destini
- Christian Rose as Blaze
- Shiloh O'Reilly as Luke
- Mackenzie Gray as EMT Barclay

== Production ==
The film was shot in Vancouver, British Columbia during the spring of 2023.

== Release ==
The film was released on Tubi on April 5, 2024.
