= Barbara Gordon in other media =

Barbara Gordon in non-comic book media

Adaptations of Barbara Gordon in other media
- Original source: Comics published by DC Comics
- First appearance: Detective Comics #359 (January 1967)

Films and television
- Film(s): Batman & Robin (1997) (renamed Barbara Wilson); Batman & Mr. Freeze: SubZero (1998); Batman Beyond: Return of the Joker (2000); Batman: Mystery of the Batwoman (2003); Batman: Bad Blood (2016); Batman: The Killing Joke (2016); The Lego Batman Movie (2017); Batgirl (unreleased)
- Television show(s): Batman (1966); Batman: The Animated Series (1992); The New Batman Adventures (1997); Batman Beyond (1999); Birds of Prey (2002); The Batman (2004); Batman: The Brave and the Bold (2008); Young Justice (2010); Teen Titans Go! (2013); Beware the Batman (2013); Gotham (2014); DC Super Hero Girls (2019); Harley Quinn (2019)

Originally created in 1967, the fictional comic book character Barbara Gordon has been adapted into various other forms of media. The character has appeared in both live action and animated television series and films, as well as in video games in her alter-egos as both Batgirl and Oracle.

== Film ==
=== Live-action ===
- Alicia Silverstone portrays Barbara Wilson/Batgirl in the film Batman & Robin. This version is Alfred Pennyworth's niece, which screenwriter Akiva Goldsman stated was done because Alfred was more central of a character than Jim Gordon was in their story.
- Barbara Gordon appears in The Dark Knight, portrayed by Hannah Gunn.
- Barbara Gordon as Batgirl was intended to appear in a self-titled film, portrayed by Leslie Grace, before it was cancelled due to cost-cutting measures at Warner Bros.

=== Animation ===
- Bruce Timm and co-director Lauren Montgomery expressed interest in producing an animated film based on Batgirl: Year One, but DC cancelled plans for an adaptation.
- Barbara Gordon as Batgirl makes a non-speaking cameo appearance in Batman: Bad Blood.
- Barbara Gordon as Batgirl and Oracle appears in Batman: The Killing Joke, voiced by Tara Strong. Her role and portrayal in the film, which differs heavily from most other portrayals, has been criticized as "cheap, misogynistic writing".
- Barbara Gordon as Batgirl makes a non-speaking cameo appearance in Teen Titans Go! To the Movies.
- Barbara Gordon as Batgirl appears in Batman vs. Teenage Mutant Ninja Turtles, voiced by Rachel Bloom.
- Barbara Gordon as Batgirl appears in Batman: Hush, voiced by Peyton List.
- Barbara Gordon makes a non-speaking appearance in Batman: Death in the Family.
- Barbara Gordon as Batgirl makes a non-speaking cameo appearance in Justice League Dark: Apokolips War. She fights Apokolips' forces alongside Batwoman before being killed by Paradooms.
- Barbara Gordon as Batgirl makes a non-speaking cameo appearance in Space Jam: A New Legacy.
- Barbara Gordon as Oracle appears in Batman: The Doom That Came to Gotham, voiced by Gideon Adlon. This version is paraplegic, uses technology to speak, and possesses clairvoyant abilities.
- Barbara Gordon as Batgirl appears in Justice League: Crisis on Infinite Earths, voiced again by Gideon Adlon.

=== Lego films ===
- Barbara Gordon as Batgirl appears in The Lego Batman Movie, voiced by Rosario Dawson. This version is the new Police Commissioner of the Gotham City Police Department after her father retires, and becomes Batgirl to help Batman recapture the Phantom Zone escapees.
- Barbara Gordon as Batgirl appears in Lego DC Comics Super Heroes: Justice League – Gotham City Breakout, voiced by Sarah Hyland.
- Barbara Gordon as Batgirl appears in Lego DC Super Hero Girls: Brain Drain, voiced by Ashlyn Madden.
- Barbara Gordon as Batgirl appears in Lego DC Comics Super Heroes: Aquaman – Rage of Atlantis, voiced by Alyson Stoner.
- Barbara Gordon as Batgirl appears in Lego DC Super Hero Girls: Super-Villain High, voiced again by Ashlyn Madden.
- Barbara Gordon as Batgirl appears in Lego DC Batman: Family Matters, voiced again by Alyson Stoner.

== Television ==
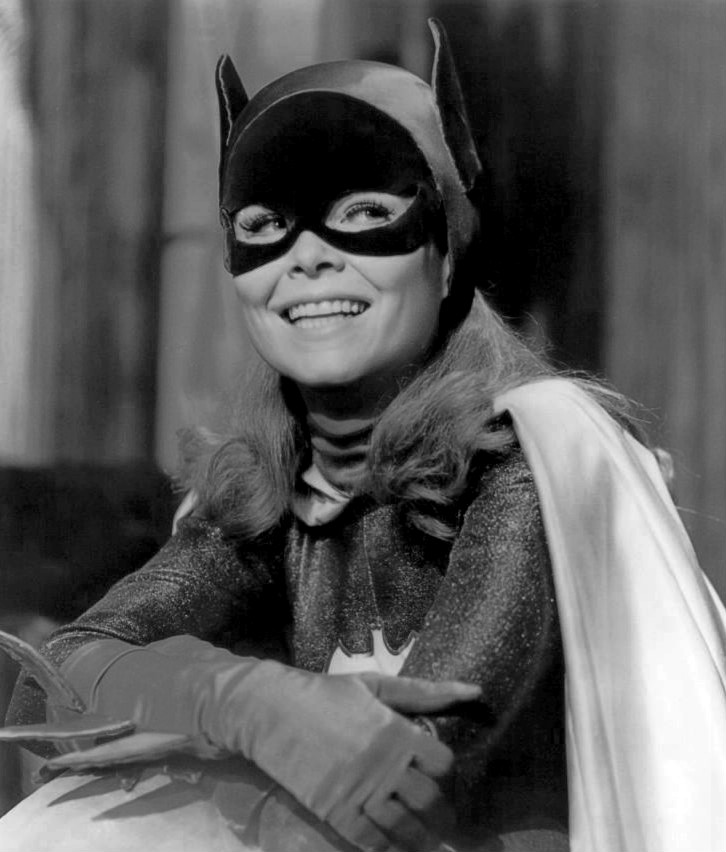
Yvonne Craig as Batgirl in Batman (1966).

Barbara Gordon as Batgirl in Batman: The Animated Series.

=== Live-action ===
- Barbara Gordon as Batgirl appears in the third season of Batman (1966), portrayed by Yvonne Craig. Her debut coincided with her debut in the comics. Craig later reprised the Batgirl role in a 1972 commercial supporting women's rights and equal pay. The 2003 television film Return to the Batcave: The Misadventures of Adam and Burt includes scenes recreating the filming of the 1960s TV series, with Batgirl portrayed by Erin Carufel.
- Barbara Gordon as Batgirl and Oracle appears in Birds of Prey, portrayed by Dina Meyer. Meyer later reprised the role in the Arrowverse crossover event "Crisis on Infinite Earths".
- Barbara Gordon appears in Titans, portrayed by Savannah Welch. This version became the Commissioner of the Gotham City Police Department after her father's death at the hands of Mr. Freeze, and retired from her Batgirl persona after being paralyzed by the Joker. She also had her right leg amputated, a trait that was implemented following Welch's casting. Barbara was intended to appear as a member of the eponymous Teen Titans, but her role was reduced.
- Barbara Lee Gordon appears in the fifth season of Gotham, portrayed by Jeté Laurence.

=== Animation ===
- Barbara Gordon as Batgirl appears in The Adventures of Batman, voiced by Jane Webb.
- Barbara Gordon as Batgirl appears in The New Adventures of Batman, voiced by Melendy Britt.
- Barbara Gordon as Batgirl appears in series set in the DC Animated Universe (DCAU), voiced by Melissa Gilbert in Batman: The Animated Series, Mary Kay Bergman in Batman & Mr. Freeze: SubZero, and by Tara Strong in The New Batman Adventures, Batman: Mystery of the Batwoman, Gotham Girls, and Batman Beyond: Return of the Joker. An older Barbara Gordon appears in Batman Beyond voiced by Stockard Channing in the first two seasons and Angie Harmon in the final season, as well as in Return of the Joker. In the future of Batman Beyond, Barbara succeeds her father as Gotham's police commissioner. Furthermore, an alternate timeline variant of Barbara makes a cameo appearance in the Justice League episode "The Savage Time".
- Barbara Gordon as Batgirl and Oracle appears in The Batman, voiced by Danielle Judovits as Batgirl and Kellie Martin as Oracle. This version is a skilled gymnast and friend of Pamela Isley who was inspired to become Batgirl after seeing Batman fight Temblor. During her initial introduction, she demands to be called "Batwoman" until Commissioner Gordon calls her by the Batgirl name. In the episode "Artifacts", Barbara is depicted operating as Oracle, in a potential future.
- Barbara Gordon as Batgirl appears in Batman: The Brave and the Bold, voiced by Mae Whitman. Additionally, the series finale "Mitefall!" sees Bat-Mite altering reality to make Batman: The Brave and the Bold "jump the shark" so that it will be cancelled and replaced with a more serious Batman series. In the end, he succeeds, and an in-universe commercial for the (fictional) replacement series reveals that the new show will focus on Batgirl instead, with Batman as a supporting character.
- Barbara Gordon as Batgirl and Oracle appears in Young Justice, voiced by Alyson Stoner. This version is initially a student at the Gotham Academy before joining the Team during the time skip between the first and second seasons. In the tie-in comics, she is shown to have a romantic interest in Dick Grayson, and appears to have a "friends with benefits" relationship. In the third season, Young Justice: Outsiders, Barbara becomes Oracle after Orphan accidentally injures and paralyzes her, and enters a relationship with Dick.
- Barbara Gordon as Batgirl appears in Super Best Friends Forever, voiced again by Tara Strong.
- Barbara Gordon as Oracle appears in Beware the Batman, voiced again by Tara Strong. This version is a member of the Outsiders.
- Barbara Gordon as Batgirl appears in Teen Titans Go!, voiced again by Tara Strong.
- Barbara Gordon as Batgirl appears in the DC Super Hero Girls franchise, voiced again by Mae Whitman in the first four seasons of the web series, Ashley Madden in the fifth season, and Tara Strong in the 2019 series. This version is a tomboyish and cheerful student at Super Hero High who aspires to be Batman's sidekick.
- Barbara Gordon as Batgirl and Oracle appears in Harley Quinn, voiced by Briana Cuoco.
- Barbara Gordon appears in Batman: Caped Crusader, voiced by Krystal Joy Brown.

== Video games ==
- Barbara Gordon as Oracle appears in Batman: Dark Tomorrow, voiced by Cynthia Farrell.
- Barbara Gordon as Batgirl appears in Batman: Rise of Sin Tzu, voiced again by Tara Strong.
- Barbara Gordon as Batgirl appears as a non-playable character in Batman: Vengeance, voiced again by Tara Strong.
- Barbara Gordon as Batgirl appears as an unlockable playable character in Lego Batman: The Videogame, voiced by Grey DeLisle.
- Barbara Gordon as Oracle appears as a non-playable character in DC Universe Online, voiced by Kathy Catmull.
- Barbara Gordon as Batgirl appears as a playable character in Lego Batman 2: DC Super Heroes, voiced by Kari Wahlgren.
- Barbara Gordon as Batgirl appears as a playable character in Young Justice: Legacy, voiced by Danica McKellar.
- Barbara Gordon as Batgirl appears as a playable character in Injustice: Gods Among Us, voiced again by Kimberly Brooks. Additionally, an alternate universe counterpart of her from the Regime universe appears. This version originally supplied information to the Insurgency to avoid detection by the Regime, taking up the Batgirl mantle after her father's death from cancer.
- Barbara Gordon as Barbara Gordon as Batgirl and Oracle appears in Scribblenauts Unmasked: A DC Comics Adventure. In the game's story, she initially operates as the latter before Maxwell travels back in time to stop the Joker from crippling her.
- Barbara Gordon as Batgirl appears as a playable character in Lego Batman 3: Beyond Gotham, voiced again by Kimberly Brooks.
- The Lego Batman Movie version of Batgirl appears as a playable character in Lego Dimensions.
- Barbara Gordon as Batgirl appears as a boss and playable character in Lego DC Super-Villains, voiced again by Tara Strong.
- Barbara Gordon as Batgirl appears in DC Super Hero Girls: Teen Power, voiced again by Tara Strong.
- Barbara Gordon as Batgirl appears as a playable character in Gotham Knights, voiced by America Young.
- Barbara Gordon as Batgirl appears as a playable character in Lego Batman: Legacy of the Dark Knight, voiced by Savannah Beckford.

=== Batman: Arkham ===
Barbara Gordon as Batgirl and Oracle appears in the Batman: Arkham series, voiced by Kimberly Brooks in Arkham Asylum and Arkham City, Kelsey Lansdowne in Arkham Origins, Ashley Greene in Arkham Knight, and Chelsea Kane in Arkham Shadow.

== Actresses ==
Actor	Live-action television	Animated television	Radio	Live-action film	Animated film	Web series	Video games	Podcasts	
Actor	Yvonne Craig	1967–1974^{V}							
Actor	Jane Webb		1968^{V}						
Actor	Shelley Thompson			1989, 1994^{V}					
Actor	Melissa Gilbert		1992–1995^{V}						
Actor	Alicia Silverstone				1997 (Note: The character retains only part of her real name from the source material.)				
Actor	Tara Strong		1997–2023^{V}			2000–2016^{V}	2000–2002^{V}	2001–2021^{V}	
Actor	Hannah Gunn				2008				
Actor	Gina Rodriguez								2022–2023^{V}
