= Bruce Wayne (Gotham) =

Fictional character on Gotham

- Gotham character
- Bruce Wayne as Batman in the final scene of Gotham
- First appearance: "Pilot"; Gotham; September 22, 2014
- Last appearance: "The Beginning..."; Gotham; April 25, 2019
- Based on: Batman by: Bob Kane; Bill Finger
- Adapted by: Bruno Heller
- Portrayed by: David Mazouz; Mikhail Mudrik (Adult)

In-universe information
- Nickname: The Dark Knight
- Title: CEO of Wayne Enterprises
- Occupation: Vigilante
- Family: Thomas Wayne (father); Martha Wayne (mother)
- Significant other: Selina Kyle
- Nationality: American

Bruce Wayne is a fictional character appearing in the Fox series Gotham, based on the character of the same name who is the secret identity of DC Comics superhero Batman, created by Bill Finger and Bob Kane, and developed for television by Bruno Heller. Gotham portrays Bruce's teenage years and transition into adapting his Batman persona in later years. In the series, Bruce Wayne is the orphaned son of Thomas and Martha Wayne, who are murdered at the beginning of the series by a masked gunman. After the incident, Bruce began to question the inner workings of Gotham City, and along with his allies, seeks to uncover the corruption destroying Gotham and get to the reason behind his parents' murder. In the process, he begins the training that shapes his destiny as a feared vigilante.

The series marks the second time Batman was adapted for live-action television after the 1960 Batman series, though the lead character in Gotham is James Gordon. Bruce is portrayed by David Mazouz. In the series finale, during which Bruce remains mostly concealed in shadows until the final shot and is not referred to as "Batman" to build suspense, stunt double Mikhail Mudrik portrays the character in distant shots to give him a more mature appearance.

In the prequel series Pennyworth, Bruce is revealed to have had an older sister, Samantha, who disappeared long before he was born.

== Character development ==
After long efforts were made to create a television series based on Batman's origins with little success, Gotham was conceived by Bruno Heller and was eventually picked up by Fox. Though the series eventually focused on James Gordon, chronicling his rise to commissioner of the Gotham City police, Bruce Wayne remained a central character. David Mazouz went through a long audition before finally winning the role of Bruce, hearing the news after attending school one day. Mazouz cites Batman comics as main inspiration for playing his character.

For the series finale, which flashes forward ten years into the future from the rest of the series, Mikhail Mudrik provides the body double for the adult Bruce in his vigilante suit during action sequences, but Mazouz provides the character's voice and is seen in the suit for closeup shots. Bruce is deliberately not referred to as "Batman" in order to build suspense, though Oswald Cobblepot calls him "a man dressed like a bat", hinting that he will adopt the name at some point.

Mazouz said that Gotham characterizes Bruce as wise beyond his years, and that he was drawn to the character's maturity:

I really like the fact that he's such a mature kid. He's so strong and he's really not like any regular kid that you've seen before. As a kid actor, a lot of the roles that you get on TV are the son or the friend. This is such a prominent role, and an interesting role. It's a role that really is unreplaceable. I love the fact that he's so strong and so mature and so adult-like. I feel like I'm playing an adult. I don't feel like I'm playing a kid character.

— David Mazouz on his favorite aspect of portraying Bruce Wayne

In October 2022, asked alongside John Stephens as to who he would consider casting as a young 10 to 11-year-old Bruce Wayne in the Gotham and V for Vendetta prequel television series Pennyworth, while promoting its third season, Heller stated that there were no plans beyond featuring Bruce as a baby in the main plot of Pennyworth, but with regards to a future flashforward epilogue: "I think we had the best Batman out there in David Mazouz. I'll bring him back [in the series finale]."

== Role in Gotham ==
Bruce is introduced as the 12-year-old son of wealthy businessman Thomas Wayne and his wife Martha. Thomas is the CEO of Wayne Enterprises, a vast multinational corporation that he is not initially aware is actually controlled by the secret organization The Court of Owls. After Bruce's parents are murdered, he makes it his life's mission to find their killer and train in the skills necessary to protect Gotham City from further criminals.

=== Season 1 ===
In the pilot episode, Bruce witnesses a mugger murder his parents in a dark alley behind the movie theater. As the Gotham City Police Department arrives, detective Jim Gordon comforts Bruce at the scene and promises to find his parents' killer. Though Gordon and his partner Harvey Bullock find the alleged killer, Mario Pepper, and gun him down, they later realize that mobster Fish Mooney framed him and that the real killer is still at large.

Bruce becomes obsessed with finding the real killer, and with training himself to become a vigilante. Alfred Pennyworth, the Waynes' butler and Bruce's guardian following their deaths, is troubled by Bruce's behavior, but nevertheless agrees to train him in armed and unarmed combat, and becomes his guide and mentor.

Bruce later meets street orphans Selina Kyle and Ivy Pepper; unbeknownst to Bruce, Selina witnessed the murder of his parents, and Ivy is the daughter of the wrongly accused murderer. Bruce and Selina become close as Selina temporarily stays at Wayne Manor for shelter. Bruce becomes skeptical of how his father's company is run and is convinced that someone in the company wanted his parents dead. With Selina's help, he infiltrates Wayne Enterprises and gains access to crucial information. Though the executive he was trying to spy on catches him, Bruce encounters Lucius Fox in the aftermath of being caught. Fox offers to help him, revealing that Thomas Wayne did not approve of the corruption behind the company. Alfred and Bruce later find a secret cave underneath Wayne Manor belonging to his father.

=== Season 2 ===
Bruce digs further into Wayne Manor, and finds a letter from his father telling him to choose between "happiness or truth". He also finds a computer that appears to have vital information about Wayne Enterprises, but Alfred attempts to stop Bruce from investigating further out of concern for his safety, even smashing the computer. Bruce refuses to back down and fires Alfred, but later relents and hires him back under the condition they work together. Bruce, Selina and Alfred later attend a charity ball that is infiltrated by criminals led by Jerome Valeska and Barbara Kean. When Alfred's life is threatened by the intrusion, Bruce goes back for him and is almost killed himself before Theo Galavan, a wealthy industrialist, intervenes and kills Jerome. Galavan turns out to actually be the leader of the criminals, masterminding the event to make himself look like a hero while secretly planning to destroy the Wayne family. Galavan poses as a father figure to gain Bruce's trust, and Bruce grows close to Galavan's niece Silver St. Cloud. Galavan eventually reveals his true colors and kidnaps Bruce and Silver. With help from Selina, Gordon and Galavan's sister Tabitha, Bruce escapes and saves Silver's life, leaving Theo there before Gordon and crime boss Oswald Cobblepot confront and kill Theo.

The second half of season two has Bruce continuing to track down his parents' killer. Alfred eventually confronts Bruce and confirms the name of the killer as Patrick "Matches" Malone (Michael Bowen). After receiving a gun from Selina and finding Matches' location, Bruce confronts Matches in the latter's apartment, only to find that Matches was contracted by another source that he refuses to name. Matches, who is suicidal, begs Bruce to put him out of his misery, but Bruce refuses, leaving Matches to shoot himself. Bruce then decides to live in the streets with Selina to learn what it takes to fight crime in Gotham. He returns once Fox fixes his father's computer. Soon afterward, Bruce, Fox, and Alfred discover that Hugo Strange (B.D. Wong), a former colleague of Thomas Wayne, had ordered the hit. Strange had been conducting mutation experiments within Wayne Enterprises' Indian Hills program; when Thomas shut the program down, Strange retaliated by having him killed. When the GCPD refuses to indict Strange due to a lack of evidence, Bruce personally heads to Indian Hills with Selina to confront Strange, who unleashes a number of mutated monsters onto the city and captures Bruce, Lucius, and Alfred. The GCPD intervenes when Strange threatens to blow the facility up, arresting Strange and freeing the captives. Strange's monsters continue to roam the streets, however, one of them including a teenage boy who resembles Bruce himself.

=== Season 3 ===
Upon further investigation, Bruce encounters the Court of Owls, an organization revealed to be pulling the strings in Wayne Enterprises. The leader of the Court, Kathryn Monroe, offers Bruce a deal: if he stops investigating them, they will spare his life and those of his loved ones. Bruce reluctantly agrees. Bruce eventually encounters and fights his doppelgänger, faces off against a resurrected Jerome, enters a relationship with Selina, and is kidnapped and trained by a mysterious Shaman, later meeting Ra's al Ghul in the process. In the season's final scene, a masked Bruce dressed in military-grade body armor of his father's invention saves a family from a mugger.

=== Season 4 ===
While training to fight crime as the "Dark Knight", Bruce starts investigating Ra's al Ghul, and learns that the mysterious terrorist wants to gain possession of a millennia-old dagger. Bruce buys the dagger at auction to draw Ra's out, but Ra's retaliates by killing Bruce's young friend Alex. Bruce becomes obsessed with avenging Alex, and confronts Ra's – who surprises him by begging Bruce to put him out of his misery. Bruce refuses, but when Ra's threatens his loved ones, he loses control and stabs Ra's with the dagger. Bruce feels guilty for killing Ra's in cold blood, and falls into a deep depression. He numbs the pain by partying nonstop, fires Alfred and gives up his plan to protect Gotham. When Ivy (Peyton List) doses him with her hallucinogenic plant toxin, however, he envisions a fearsome, mysterious cloaked entity representing what he would be in the future, who says he cannot escape who he really is before dissolving into a swarm of bats. That night, he reconciles with Alfred, and prevents Ivy from killing a crowd full of Gotham's social elite at a charity auction.

Meanwhile, he befriends Jerome Valeska's twin brother Jeremiah – unaware that he is just as insane as his brother and planning to destroy Gotham. The League of Shadows later kidnaps Bruce with the goal of resurrecting Ra's and having Ra's usurp the League's current leader, Barbara Kean. Bruce reluctantly does so as a way to redeem his sin and Ra's returns, albeit in a weakened form. Ra's eventually regains his strength and promises to leave Bruce alone until the time comes to reforge Bruce into "Gotham's Dark Knight." After Jeremiah's plan to bomb the city fails, Ra's returns to Gotham to ally himself with Jeremiah to fulfill Bruce's destiny. When Ra's and Jeremiah reveal their plan, they both tell Bruce that they are destroying Gotham for his benefit, to help him become the "Dark Knight" he is destined to be. The two criminal masterminds kidnap Alfred and dose Bruce with Jonathan Crane's fear toxin, plaguing him with hallucinations of Alfred going insane and attacking him. When it wears off, he returns with Alfred and Selina to Wayne Manor – where Jeremiah appears and shoots Selina in the stomach, injuring her spinal cord. After seeing Selina off to the hospital, he goes to confront Ra's and Jeremiah, who have destroyed all bridges leading outside of Gotham, turning the city into a "No Man's Land". During the ensuing struggle, Kean, Ra's' onetime lover and protégé, puts the dagger in Bruce's hand and forces him to stab Ra's, mortally wounding him. As he dies, Ra's tells Bruce that he must choose between simply being Bruce Wayne and becoming the "Dark Knight". After Gotham is evacuated, Bruce decides to stay behind and help Gordon fight the criminals who have taken over the city.

=== Season 5 ===
Months later, Bruce helps Gordon provide the people of the Narrows with food, shelter and medicine. He also uses herbs reluctantly supplied by Ivy to help Selina regain the ability to walk. When Selina goes after Jeremiah looking for revenge, he tries to stop her, but is unable to prevent her from stabbing and seemingly killing Jeremiah. She tearfully confesses to him that she saw his parents die and did nothing, and rejects his attempts to comfort her.

Meanwhile, Jeremiah, who has become obsessed with Bruce, kidnaps him and tries to convince him of his plan to recreate the night that Bruce's parents were murdered. When Bruce refuses and sees the ruse, Jeremiah blows up Wayne Manor. Jeremiah then flees to Ace Chemicals, and in the ensuing struggle with Bruce falls into a vat of toxic waste.

Soon afterward, Ivy uses her plant toxins to hypnotize Bruce and get him to poison Gotham's water supply. Selina manages to snap him out of it, and they defeat Ivy with help from Fox. Later, Bruce and Selina attend the wedding of Gordon and Leslie Thompkins, and share a passionate kiss.

Theresa Walker, the government operative who has been overseeing Gotham's reconstruction, reveals her true identity as Nyssa al Ghul, Ra's al Ghul's daughter, and pledges to avenge her father's death by killing Bruce. With help from Selina and Gordon, Bruce defeats Nyssa, but at a cost: Nyssa's henchman Bane severely injures Alfred. Bruce blames himself, and leaves Gotham so no one else he loves will be hurt. Before he leaves, he tells Alfred that he will be gone a long time, but that he will return once he is able to protect Gotham. Bruce decides to start his training for his war on crime.

In the series finale ten years later, Bruce returns to Gotham, which has flourished with Gordon as Commissioner of the GCPD, to celebrate the opening of the new Wayne Tower. At the same time, a mysterious vigilante in a bat-like costume begins apprehending Gotham's wanted criminals, including Cobblepot and Nygma, AKA The Penguin and The Riddler, and a returned and disfigured Jeremiah, who had abducted Gordon's daughter Barbara Lee. This mysterious figure, whom Lucius and Alfred know is Bruce, also has a run-in with Selina, who has become a cat burglar, and has a quietly emotional exchange with her while concealed in the shadows. After escaping a prison van, Cobblepot and Nygma plot their revenge on the vigilante despite their fears of him. Finally, as Gordon and Bullock ignite a searchlight, he silently observes the city from afar atop a building, cementing his status as Gotham's protector for years to come.

== Reception ==
Mazouz has received praise for his portrayal of the teenage Bruce Wayne, with critics lauding his mature approach to portraying the character, especially for someone his age. However, there was some criticism for the perceived rushed pacing of Bruce's development in the show. In 2018, Mazouz was nominated for the Saturn Award for the Best Performance by a Younger Actor in a Television Series and the "Choice Action TV Actor" award at the Teen Choice Awards.

== See also ==
- List of Gotham and Pennyworth characters
- Batman in other media
