= Francesca Root-Dodson =

American actress

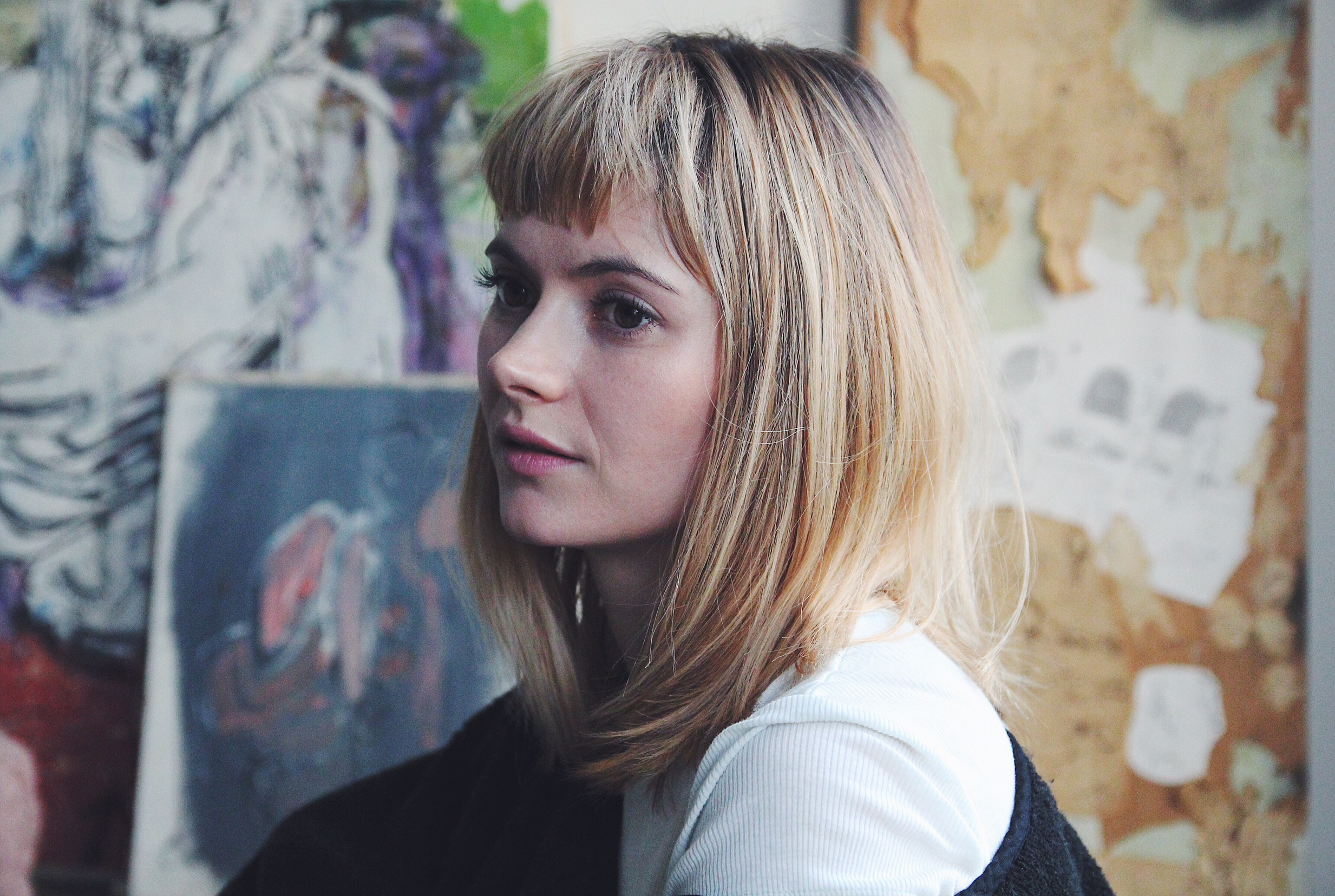
- Occupation: Actor
- Years active: 2010–present

Francesca Root-Dodson is an American actress. She is best known for her role as Ecco in the Fox series Gotham.

== Career ==
Root-Dodson began her career co-starring in Luke Matheny's Oscar-winning short film God of Love.

In 2018, Root-Dodson began a recurring role as Ecco, a character similar to Harley Quinn, in the Fox series Gotham. Ecco is the assistant of Jeremiah Valeska, the show's version of the Joker. Executive producer John Stephens teased at Gotham's New York Comic-Con panel in October 2018 that Jeremiah would be paired with a "somewhat deranged girlfriend who dresses in a multicolored fashion." Starting with season 5, Stephens explained that the show would be injecting "a lot of the same elements of madness and anarchy, and the sort of mad love that Harley has, and placing it into the Ecco character."

Root-Dodson has appeared in two music videos: the video for “Morning Light” by the San Francisco band Girls and James Arthur’s video for “Falling Like the Stars.”

Root-Dodson played Bridget in season four of Succession in which her character carried a “ludicrously capacious” handbag.

== Personal life ==
Root-Dodson has a daughter born in December 2019.

== Filmography ==
Television
Year	Title	Role	Notes
2011	Blue Bloods	Sissy	as Francesca McLaughlin
2016	The Jim Gaffigan Show	Caroline's Waitress	
2017	The Blacklist	Ana Dewan	
2018	Deception	Bridget Olovsky	
2018	FBI	Elizabeth Kernick	
2018–2019	Gotham	Ecco	8 episodes
2019	Alternatino with Arturo Castro	Casey	
2023	Succession	Bridget	

Film
Year	Title	Role	Notes
2010	God of Love	French Beauty	short film, as Francesca McLaughlin
2017	Rebel in the Rye	Carol Flourentine	
2018	Private Life	Fiona	
2019	The Undiscovered Country	Young Kathy	
2019	Free Spirit	Girl	Root-Dodson also wrote and directed
2020	The Drummer	Lt. Rodriguez	
2024	A New York Story	Elizabeth Ballinger	
2024	Doctor Doctor	Mrs. Thurston	
