= Jim Gordon (Gotham) =

Fictional character in the Fox TV series Gotham

- Gotham character
- Ben McKenzie as James Gordon, in television series Gotham.
- First appearance: "Pilot"; Gotham; September 22, 2014
- Last appearance: "The Beginning..."; Gotham; April 25, 2019
- Based on: Jim Gordon by: Bob Kane; Bill Finger; Lawrence Donovan; Henry Ralston; John Nanovic
- Adapted by: Bruno Heller
- Portrayed by: Ben McKenzie

In-universe information
- Full name: James Gordon
- Nickname: Jim
- Gender: Male
- Occupation: GCPD Police Commissioner; Private investigator/Bounty hunter; United States Army soldier
- Family: Peter Gordon (father); Frank Gordon (uncle)
- Spouse: Leslie "Lee" Thompkins (wife)
- Significant others: Barbara Kean (ex-fiancé); Valerie Vale (formerly); Sofia Falcone (formerly)
- Children: Barbara Lee Gordon (daughter)
- Nationality: American

Police and military career
- Department: Gotham City Police Department
- Years of service: 2014–present
- Rank: Commissioner
- Branch: United States Army
- Battles/wars: Iraq War

James "Jim" Gordon is a fictional character adapted for television by screenwriter Bruno Heller. He serves as the main protagonist of the Warner Bros. and DC Comics television series Gotham, portrayed by Ben McKenzie.

He is based on a character of the same name created by Bill Finger and Bob Kane, debuting in Detective Comics #27 (May 1939), though is most well-known as the supporting lead of the superhero comic, Batman.

McKenzie received a generally positive critical reception for his portrayal of the character, appearing in every episode of the series, and the novel Gotham: City of Monsters, set in-between the events of the second and third seasons.

== Fictional character biography ==
=== Season 1 ===
Gordon is introduced as a homicide detective and Iraq War veteran of the U.S. Army who has recently been transferred to Gotham City, where he lives with his fiancée, Barbara Kean. In his first case, Gordon and his partner, Detective Harvey Bullock, are assigned to investigate Thomas and Martha Wayne's murder. After arriving at the crime scene, he comforts the Waynes' son, Bruce, who witnessed his parents' murder, promising him that he would do everything in his power to find the murderer and bring them to justice.

During his investigation, Gordon runs afoul of a gangster Fish Mooney, who takes him hostage. Bullock later goes searching for him and is captured alongside him. The two are freed by Gotham's most powerful mob boss, Carmine Falcone, who was an old friend of Gordon's deceased father. In return, Falcone asks Gordon to kill Oswald "Penguin" Cobblepot, Mooney's underling who had informed her of the GCPD. Instead of killing him, Gordon fakes Cobblepot's death and orders him never to come back to Gotham.

After Gordon's gun is used to kill Dick Lovecraft, a corrupt billionaire, Mayor Aubrey James reassigns him to Arkham Asylum as a guard. Gordon is later reinstated as a homicide detective by Commissioner Gillian B. Loeb after he captures a serial killer who had escaped from Arkham during a prison riot. Gordon then blackmails Loeb into naming him the President of the Gotham City Police Union. At the end of the season, he discovers that Barbara is in fact a murderer, and begins a relationship with Arkham physician Leslie "Lee" Thompkins. He is also present during a gang war between Mooney and mob boss Sal Maroni, during which Mooney and Maroni are killed, Falcone retires, and Cobblepot takes control of Gotham's criminal underworld.

=== Season 2 ===
After the events of the first season, Gordon is demoted to patrol officer by a vengeful Loeb. He is later reinstated as a Detective after Cobblepot blackmails Loeb into retiring and appointing Captain Sarah Essen to replace him as Commissioner.

Theo Galavan and his sister Tabitha launch a campaign of terror against Gotham in the name of the Order of St. Dumas. This leads to the kidnapping of Mayor Aubrey James and the death of Commissioner Essen. Gordon becomes determined to arrest the perpetrators. Meanwhile, Theo and Tabitha recruit Barbara and Jerome Valeska to their cause. Gordon's relationship with Lee begins to deteriorate due to his obsession with catching the Galavans and Barbara.

Gordon is able to gather enough evidence to indict Theo on kidnapping charges, only for Galavan to achieve an acquittal. Gordon is forced to join forces with Penguin amongst others to capture the Order of St. Dumas and save Bruce from being used as a sacrifice. After saving Bruce, Penguin convinces Gordon of the strong possibility that Theo Galavan will escape justice after terrorizing the city. The two take him to an isolated place outside Gotham, where Cobblepot beats him mercilessly until Gordon stops him and shoots Galavan dead. He also learns that Lee is pregnant with his child, inspiring him to propose to her. He is later framed for the murder of corrupt cop Carl Pinkley by GCPD forensics technician Edward Nygma, and he breaks his engagement to Lee, who subsequently miscarries their child. He is later broken out by Falcone, and he chooses to stay at Gotham to prove his innocence. He exposes Nygma for the murder of both Pinkney and forensics scientist Kristin Kringle, sending him to Arkham.

Gordon rejects an offer to return to GCPD, determined to solve the Wayne murders as a form of redemption for killing Galavan. He teams up with a semi-reformed Barbara to learn that Matches Malone was the hitman and Hugo Strange was the one who ordered the assassination. In retaliation for the investigation, Strange resurrects Galavan and hypnotizes him into believing his a knight named Azrael. Strange tells "Azrael" that Gordon is a sinner who needs to be destroyed. While hunting Gordon, Azrael's identity is exposed to the news, causing the public to believe Theo never died. Gordon is forced to team up with Tabitha, who wishes to reach her brother's original personality. After recovering his memories, Theo abandons his pursuit of Gordon and desires to sacrifice Bruce once more. Bruce and Gordon are saved by Penguin and Butch Gilzean, who kill Galavan with a bazooka. Gordon eventually helps defend Gotham from the monsters that Hugo Strange has unleashed.

=== Season 3 ===
After apprehending Strange, Gordon leaves Bullock in charge of the GCPD and goes off to find Lee, only to discover she has moved on to a new lover, Mario Calvi, the son of Carmine Falcone. He ends up becoming a bounty hunter after he declined his reinstatement as a detective. Gordon works to hunt down a resurrected Fish Mooney in order to collect Cobblepot's bounty, although this act puts others' lives at risk. This manhunt causes him to meet a reporter named Valerie Vale, with whom he develops a romantic relationship.

After Mooney leaves Gotham, Gordon finds himself in a conflict with a crazed hypnotist named Jervis Tetch, who hires Gordon to find his long-lost sister, Alice. Gordon learns Alice was abused by Jervis in a multitude of ways. Jervis kidnaps his sister and Gordon attempts to save her, only for Alice to accidentally be impaled. As a result, Jervis blames Gordon for the death of his sister Alice. This causes Jervis to kidnap Lee and Vale, giving Gordon the choice as to who lives and who dies. After telling Jervis to kill Lee, he shoots Vale instead, not knowing that Gordon expected him to do so. Vale survives but the two break up after Gordon admits he still cares about Lee. Tetch creates a virus from Alice's mutated blood that turns its victims into crazed killers and infects Calvi with it; when Calvi tries to kill Lee on their wedding day, Gordon is forced to kill him.

After rethinking his life and rejoining the GCPD, Gordon discovers that his late father was a member of the Court of Owls, a secret society that has controlled crime in Gotham for centuries, and he joins it in order to bring it down from the inside. Simultaneously, Gordon is also forced to help find an antidote for Tetch's virus as it infects dozens of people, including himself, Lee, and GCPD Captain Nathaniel Barnes. He and Lee eventually come to terms with each other after the chaos subsides, and reaffirm their love for each other before Lee leaves the city once again.

=== Season 4 ===
Months later, Gordon watches with growing frustration as Cobblepot pledges to control the city's crime by issuing "licenses" allowing criminals to break the law as long as they agree to his "standards". The GCPD turns a blind eye, except for Gordon, who pledges to take Cobblepot down. He restores public confidence in the police by saving Bruce from Jonathan Crane and going after a masked serial killer calling himself Professor Pyg, who is killing corrupt GCPD officers. Gordon's heroics result in his being promoted to Captain of the GCPD, replacing Bullock.

Meanwhile, Don Falcone's daughter Sofia returns to Gotham, and she and Gordon are instantly attracted to each other. However, Gordon eventually learns that Sofia pulled strings to get him promoted so she could have someone loyal to her running the GCPD. When Sofia instigates the murder of her own father, Gordon confronts her and learns that she hired Professor Pyg to terrorize the city and give Gordon a chance to be a hero. She kills Pyg, and tells Gordon that he can ally with her or lose any chance he has of making Gotham safe. He reluctantly agrees to keep her secrets. Gordon renews his acquaintance with Lee, who is now running the Narrows with Nygma, her new lover. She helps Gordon take Sofia down by shooting her in the head, putting her in a coma. Lee prevents Nygma from killing Gordon, and Gordon tells her he wishes they could be together; Lee replies that it can never be.

Meanwhile, Gordon's old nemesis Jerome Valeska threatens the entire city with Crane's madness-inducing laughing gas, leading Gordon and Bullock to pursue him into an underground lair, where they meet his twin brother, Jeremiah. Jerome escapes them and prepares to poison the entire city, but Gordon foils his plan with Cobblepot's reluctant assistance. In the ensuing struggle, Jerome falls to his death. However, Jeremiah – after being dosed with Crane's gas and driven insane – soon threatens Gotham City as well, with help from Ra's al Ghul. The two criminal masterminds destroy the bridges leading out of Gotham City, turning the city into an isolated "No Man's Land". After Gotham is evacuated, Gordon resolves to stay behind, along with Bruce Wayne, to protect the city from the criminals who have taken it over.

=== Season 5 ===
Gordon is put in charge of the "Green Zone", the one section of Gotham that isn't controlled by criminals. To that end, he negotiates for better living conditions with government official Theresa Walker – unaware that she is really Ra's al Ghul's daughter Nyssa, orchestrating a plan to destroy the city to avenge her father's death. She sends in Gordon's army buddy Eduardo Dorrance, who declares the city in a state of martial law and tries to kill him. Gordon fights and severely injures Dorrance, but Nyssa saves his life and recreates him as the monstrous Bane.

When Nyssa brainwashes Nygma into perpetrating an act of terrorism, Gordon assembles a task force to stop her – which includes Cobblepot and Nygma. Meanwhile, Gordon and Barbara have a tryst that results in her pregnancy; while Gordon wants nothing to do with her, he promises to be there for their child. After he is nearly killed during a cease-fire, he realizes that he truly loves Lee, and he proposes to her. They get married at GCPD headquarters, with Bullock officiating.

When Barbara goes into labor with Gordon's child, Nyssa orders Bane to kill both her and the baby and also tortures Gordon. He escapes, however, and leads a counter-offensive that ends when he convinces Bane's men to lay down their arms and oversees the arrest of Bane. Barbara then presents him with his newborn daughter, whom they name Barbara Lee. For his heroics, Gordon is promoted to Commissioner of the GCPD.

Ten years later, Gordon is contemplating retirement when Cobblepot kidnaps him, wanting revenge; Gordon put him in Blackgate Prison shortly after the reunification of Gotham. Gordon tells Cobblepot that he is being used – by an unseen opponent who later turns out to be Jeremiah – and escapes. Soon afterward, Jeremiah kidnaps Barbara Lee and brings her to the Ace Chemicals, threatening to drop her into the same vat of chemicals that disfigured him. At the last moment, however, an unseen figure saves Barbara and apprehends Jeremiah. That night, the same figure a vigilante dressed as a bat, who is secretly Bruce apprehends Cobblepot and Nygma, and appears before Gordon and Bullock after they summon him with a signal. When Bullock asks who this figure is, Gordon smiles, and says, "A friend."

== Career ==
=== List of assignments ===
- Junior Detective, GCPD Homicide (September 22, 2014 – November 24, 2014)
- Guard, Arkham Asylum (January 5, 2015 – January 19, 2015)
- Junior Detective, GCPD Homicide (January 19, 2015 – May 4, 2015)
- Patrol Officer, Gotham City Police Department (September 21, 2015)
- Detective, GCPD Homicide (September 21, 2015– November 2017)
- President of the Gotham City Police Union (March 2, 2015 – May 4, 2015)
- Captain, Gotham City Police Department (November 2017–April 18, 2019)
- Commissioner, Gotham City Police Department (April 18, 2019–present)

=== Ranks ===
- Detective 1st Grade
- Officer
- Detective 1st Grade
- Officer
- Detective 1st Grade
- Captain
- Commissioner

=== Partners ===
- Detective Harvey Bullock, GCPD (September 22, 2014 – May 4, 2015)
- Officer Franks, GCPD (September 21, 2015)
- Detective Harvey Bullock, GCPD (September 28, 2015 – March 21, 2016, November 8, 2016 – November 8, 2017, March 22, 2018 – present)

== Portrayal ==
In September 2013, it was reported that Fox was developing a TV series centred on James Gordon's early days as a police detective and the origin stories of various Batman villains. In February 2014, McKenzie was cast as the lead character. When describing his character in an interview, McKenzie stated that Gordon "is a truly honest man. The last honest man in a city full of crooked people. He's not an anti-hero, he's a true hero – but he will have to compromise."
