= Gotham (TV series) =

American superhero television series (2014–2019)

- Genre: Crime drama; Action; Superhero
- Based on: Characters by DC Comics
- Developed by: Bruno Heller
- Starring: Ben McKenzie; Donal Logue; David Mazouz; Zabryna Guevara; Sean Pertwee; Robin Lord Taylor; Erin Richards; Camren Bicondova; Cory Michael Smith; Victoria Cartagena; Andrew Stewart-Jones; John Doman; Cameron Monaghan; Jada Pinkett Smith; Morena Baccarin; James Frain; Jessica Lucas; Chris Chalk; Drew Powell; Nicholas D'Agosto; Michael Chiklis; Maggie Geha; Benedict Samuel; Alexander Siddig
- Composers: Graeme Revell; David E. Russo
- Country of origin: United States
- Original language: English
- No. of seasons: 5
- No. of episodes: 100 (list of episodes)

Production
- Executive producers: Danny Cannon; Bruno Heller; John Stephens; Ben Edlund; Ken Woodruff
- Producers: Scott White; Rebecca Perry Cutter
- Production locations: New York City, New York
- Cinematography: David Stockton; Thomas Yatsko; Christopher Norr; Crescenzo Notarile
- Editors: Daniel Gabbe; David Ekstrom; Mark C. Baldwin; John Ganem; Barrie Wise; Leland Sexton; Sarah C. Reeves
- Running time: 42–49 minutes
- Production companies: Primrose Hill Productions; DC Entertainment; Warner Bros. Television

Original release
- Network: Fox
- Release: September 22, 2014 – April 25, 2019

Related
- Pennyworth

Gotham is an American superhero crime drama television series developed by Bruno Heller, produced by Warner Bros. Television and based on characters from the Batman mythos in comic books published by DC Comics. It features an ensemble cast that includes Ben McKenzie as James "Jim" Gordon, Donal Logue as Harvey Bullock, and David Mazouz as Bruce Wayne. The show follows Gordon's early days at the Gotham City Police Department following the murder of Bruce's parents, as well as the origin stories of Batman's infamous rogues gallery. The series premiered on Fox on September 22, 2014, and ended on April 25, 2019, after five seasons totalling 100 episodes.

Development for a prequel series based on Batman began in September 2013, with Bruno Heller hired by Fox to serve as a writer and executive producer. In March 2014, Fox originally ordered 16 episodes for its first season before expanding it to 22. Filming primarily took place across New York City. In May 2018, Fox renewed the series for a fifth and final season, consisting of 12 episodes, which premiered on January 3, 2019, and concluded on April 25, 2019.

A prequel series, Pennyworth, starring Jack Bannon as a younger version of the iteration of Alfred Pennyworth portrayed by Sean Pertwee in Gotham, began airing in July 2019 and concluded in October 2022.

== Plot ==
In the first season, GCPD Detective James Gordon and his partially corrupt partner Harvey Bullock are tasked with solving a number of criminal cases in Gotham City, including the murder of 12-year-old Bruce Wayne's parents. A gang war brews between crime families led by Carmine Falcone, Sal Maroni, and Fish Mooney, with low-level thug Oswald Cobblepot forced into its center.

In the second season, Theo Galavan surfaces in Gotham to kill Bruce Wayne for the Order of St. Dumas; Gordon is framed for murder by Edward Nygma; and at Arkham Asylum, Professor Hugo Strange runs unorthodox experiments in a secret facility called Indian Hill, transforming its inmates into monsters for the mysterious Court of Owls.

In the third season, Gordon becomes a bounty hunter working to track down the Indian Hill monsters. Jervis Tetch threatens the city's safety with a deadly virus; Cobblepot and Nygma struggle for control over Gotham; and Bruce is told by the Court of Owls' leader to seek out Ra's al Ghul to complete his training.

In the fourth season, Bruce begins to fight crime as a masked vigilante tentatively named the "Dark Knight" to prepare for Ra's al Ghul's return; Sofia Falcone arrives in Gotham to reclaim the criminal underworld from Cobblepot, who has established a new law of "licensed crime"; and Jeremiah Valeska is driven insane and forms an alliance with Ra's al Ghul to turn the city into an isolated ruin, forcing Bruce to fulfill his destiny as "Gotham's Dark Knight".

In the fifth and final season, Gordon and his allies attempt to restore order in Gotham. Nyssa al Ghul seeks vengeance for her father's death; Eduardo Dorrance takes control of the city's military presence; and Jeremiah hatches a scheme to torment Bruce and cement their "bond" as hated enemies.

A decade later, Bruce returns to Gotham, which has flourished with Gordon as commissioner of the GCPD, and begins fighting crime as a bat-inspired vigilante, capturing Cobblepot and Nygma after both attempt to kill Gordon. Jeremiah, having feigned brain death during this time, escapes from Arkham to resume his rivalry with Bruce, but is captured by him soon after, starting animosity between Jeremiah and Bruce's alter-egos. Gordon decides against retirement and uses a searchlight atop the police department to contact the new vigilante.

== Episodes ==
Season	Episodes	Originally released		Rank	Avg. viewers (in millions)
Season	Episodes	First released	Last released	Rank	Avg. viewers (in millions)
1	22	September 22, 2014	May 4, 2015	68	7.56
2	22	September 21, 2015	May 23, 2016	89	5.37
3	22	September 19, 2016	June 5, 2017	100	4.52
4	22	September 21, 2017	May 17, 2018	129	3.69
5	12	January 3, 2019	April 25, 2019	125	3.68

== Cast and characters ==
- Ben McKenzie as James Gordon:
  In September 2013, it was reported that Fox was developing a TV series centered on James Gordon's early days as a police detective and the origin stories of various Batman villains. In February 2014, McKenzie was cast as the lead character. When describing his character in an interview, McKenzie stated that Gordon "is a truly honest man. The last honest man in a city full of crooked people. He's not an anti-hero, he's a true hero – but he will have to compromise."
- Donal Logue as Harvey Bullock: In early 2014, it was announced that Logue was cast as Harvey Bullock, a character who serves as James Gordon's ethically conflicted partner in the GCPD.
- David Mazouz as Bruce Wayne:
  In March 2014, Mazouz was cast as Bruce Wayne. When discussing his character, Mazouz stated that "you never got to explore what Bruce Wayne was going through or his grieving process or what his anger makes him do. At this point in his life, he's angry, he's scared, he's compulsive, and he's lonely. He's looking for any meaning to his parents' death. You'll see the things that he'll do to himself and to other people while he's grieving, and you'll see how he becomes a regular kid again." Mikhail Mudrik portrays an adult Bruce wearing the Batman suit in the series finale.
- Zabryna Guevara as Sarah Essen (season 1–2):
  In February 2014, Guevara was confirmed for the series. Descriptions revealed her character to be a police captain at the GCPD and James Gordon's direct superior.
- Sean Pertwee as Alfred Pennyworth:
  In February 2014, Pertwee was cast as Alfred Pennyworth in the series. Pertwee's character takes inspiration from the Earth One iteration of Alfred Pennyworth.
- Robin Lord Taylor as Oswald Cobblepot / The Penguin:
  In February 2014, Taylor was cast as Oswald Cobblepot, an intelligent low-level thug who used to work for Fish Mooney.
- Erin Richards as Barbara Kean:
  In February 2014, Richards was confirmed to have been cast in the show. Richards portrays James Gordon's fiancée, Barbara Kean, though their relationship deteriorates over the course of the season. She renews a past romantic relationship with Renee Montoya.
- Camren Bicondova as Selina "Cat" Kyle:
  In March 2014, Bicondova was confirmed to have joined the show's cast. According to Bicondova, "The main word that I can think of to characterize Selina is that she's just surviving. She's very mischievous and very challenging to play at times, because she feels emotions but she hides them. I realized that she isn't just a street thief and a survivor; she's actually a normal girl." Lili Simmons portrays an adult Selina in the series finale.
- Cory Michael Smith as Edward Nygma / The Riddler:
  Smith joined the cast in April 2014. In May 2014, Smith was promoted to a series regular. "What I love about the character's history is how diverse it is", says Smith. "When I was auditioning for Gotham, I got a handful of comics from different decades, so I had a perspective—it's been around for 75 years, which is a long time. I wanted to see an evolution of the comics—and of the character. Going from this quite innocent, well-intentioned, joyful person to starting to find this other part of him that he didn't know he had. He's a person who's constantly abused, and it's out of anger and exhaustion, and then realizing that when you start taking control of situations like that, you can gain power that way—it'll be something that he can start to enjoy."
- Victoria Cartagena as Renee Montoya (season 1):
  Cartagena joined the series in May 2014, but she was not a regular for the rest of the series after season one.
- Andrew Stewart-Jones as Crispus Allen (season 1):
  Stewart-Jones joined the series in May 2014, but he was not a regular for the rest of the series after season one.
- John Doman as Carmine Falcone (main season 1, recurring season 2–4):
  Doman first appeared in the series pilot as Carmine Falcone, a mob boss with ties to James Gordon's father. Doman continued to appear throughout the season.
- Jada Pinkett Smith as Fish Mooney (main season 1, recurring season 2–3):
  Smith was cast as Fish Mooney in February 2014. She appeared throughout the season until her character was seemingly killed in the show's season 1 finale after being dropped off the side of a tall building by Penguin. When asked if her character will return in future seasons, Smith replied, "If she survives the fall. I signed for a year. I don't think any of us really thought that Fish would have the life that she's had or be one of the favorite characters on the show. She was there to service a purpose, as far as helping to tell Penguin's story. I'm a smart girl. I understood I was there to service Penguin. If she survives, I would definitely be willing to do whatever was necessary to continue servicing the story of Gotham." In January 2016 it was announced that Smith would be reprising the role for the second half of season 2.
- Morena Baccarin as Leslie "Lee" Thompkins (main season 2–5, recurring season 1):
  Morena Baccarin was cast in October 2014. Baccarin was promoted to a series regular for the second season, after recurring in the first season.
- James Frain as Theo Galavan / Azrael (season 2):
  In June 2015, Frain was announced as a series regular only for season 2.
- Jessica Lucas as Tabitha Galavan / Tigress (season 2–5):
  In June 2015, Lucas was announced as series regular for season 2.
- Chris Chalk as Lucius Fox (main season 2–5, guest season 1):
  In March 2015, Chalk was announced as Lucius Fox, and was promoted to a series regular for the second season.
- Drew Powell as Butch Gilzean / Cyrus Gold / Solomon Grundy (main season 2–4, recurring season 1):
  Fish Mooney's right-hand man and mob enforcer. Victor Zsasz later "worked on" Butch, causing him to obey Oswald Cobblepot's every command, although this was later undone by Tabitha Galavan. Powell was promoted to a series regular for the second season.
- Nicholas D'Agosto as Harvey Dent (main season 2, guest season 1):
  In July 2014, it was announced that Harvey Dent would appear in the show. D'Agosto was revealed to portray Harvey Dent in October 2014, and was promoted to a series regular for the second season.
- Michael Chiklis as Nathaniel Barnes / The Executioner (season 2–3):
  In July 2015, Chiklis was announced as a series regular for season two as Captain Nathaniel Barnes.
- Maggie Geha as Ivy "Pamela" Pepper (main season 3, guest season 4):
  A young woman and old friend of Selina's who develops pheromone-based powers after consuming a mysterious elixir. The character was portrayed by Clare Foley as a recurring character in the first and second seasons. Starting with the second episode of season 3, the role was recast with Geha as a series regular. Peyton List takes over the role in the fourth and fifth seasons, as a recurring character.
- Benedict Samuel as Jervis Tetch / Mad Hatter (main season 3, recurring season 4–5):
  In August 2016, Samuel was announced as a series regular for season 3. He is described as a psychotic hypnotist with a steadfast desire to find his missing sister Alice.
- Crystal Reed as Sofia Falcone (season 4):
  The daughter of Carmine Falcone who is returning to Gotham to help Gordon take down the Penguin. Reed was announced to portray Sofia Falcone and upgraded to a series regular for season 4.
- Alexander Siddig as Ra's al Ghul (main season 4, guest season 3):
  The powerful head of the League of Assassins with a keen eye on Bruce Wayne. In March 2017, Siddig was announced to portray Ra's in the season 3 finale before being upgraded to a series regular for season 4.

== Production ==
=== Development ===
Heller said that he was initially hesitant to do a series about superheroes because he didn't know how to write about people with super powers. He also stated, "I don't think Batman works very well on TV". Heller's son suggested that the focus of the series should be Commissioner Gordon, and Heller developed the idea of Gordon investigating Bruce Wayne's parents' murder. That idea "gave us a starting point and allowed us to tell the saga from a much earlier point than before".

On September 24, 2013, Fox announced that it had bypassed the traditional pilot and placed an order for Gotham to be written and executive produced by Heller. Gotham received a series order from Fox on May 5, 2014, with the first season reported to consist of 16 episodes rather than the standard 13 or 22. On October 13, Fox ordered an additional six episodes for the show, bringing the first season order to a full 22 episodes. In February 2014, it was reported that production would begin in New York City in March, and filming finished on March 24, 2015, for the first season. On January 17, 2015, the series was renewed for a second season. The show was officially renewed by Fox for a 22-episode third season on March 16, 2016. In May 2017, Fox renewed the series for a fourth season, which premiered on September 21, 2017. On May 13, 2018, Fox renewed the series for a fifth and final season originally consisting of 10 episodes then later increased to 12. The season began production in July that year, and premiered on January 3, 2019.

Although the series is set in Gotham, various names and character designs from the Batman franchise were ultimately not allowed to be used in order to reserve them for the DCEU, combined with concerns from Warner Bros. about the television series potentially diluting the brand. This was later clarified by Cameron Monaghan, who stated that "higher-ups" did not allow his character to use the name Joker and the usage of his traditional green-hair look.

Fox Entertainment President David Madden said that the show's production team "have masterfully honored the mythology of Gotham and brought it to life with depth, emotion, and memorable high drama."

=== Casting ===
In January 2014, rumors arose that Donal Logue would portray Gordon in the series. Logue denied these rumors via Twitter. Logue was eventually cast as Harvey Bullock. In February 2014, Ben McKenzie was cast as James Gordon. McKenzie had shot a previous pilot with Heller for CBS, which led to Heller writing his characterization of Gordon with McKenzie in mind. Casting Bruce Wayne was challenging in part because, as Heller put it "It's such an important casting and it would've been very dangerous to cast the wrong person" adding that the casting process for Wayne "took a lot of negotiation, a lot of back and forth so that everyone was happy and comfortable." In early March 2014, David Mazouz was cast as Bruce Wayne while Camren Bicondova was cast as Selina Kyle. At the 2014 Chicago Comic & Entertainment Expo, DC's Jim Cunningham said that Renee Montoya would be a character on the show.

=== Music ===
In July 2014, it was announced that Graeme Revell would be the composer for the series.

== Release ==
The pilot was screened at the Warner Bros. Television and DC Entertainment panel at San Diego Comic-Con in July 2014. The series premiered on Nine Network in Australia on October 12. In Canada, it is shown in simulcast on CTV and reran on M3. In New Zealand, it premiered on TV2 on September 28. In the United Kingdom, it premiered on Channel 5 on October 13. The channel also screened the second season, but after failing to screen the third season, it was announced in August 2017 that the season would premiere exclusively on DVD and Blu-ray and be on Netflix from September 1. In Ireland, it premiered on RTÉ2 on January 26, 2015. In March 2018, it was announced that E4 had acquired the rights to air the fourth season on UK television.

In September 2014, Warner Bros. sold the series' worldwide video on demand rights to Netflix. The 100th episode and series finale aired on April 25, 2019.

== Reception ==
=== Ratings ===
Viewership and ratings per season of Gotham
Season	Timeslot (ET)	Episodes	First aired		Last aired		TV season	Viewership rank	Avg. viewers (millions)	18–49 rank	Avg. 18–49 rating
Season	Timeslot (ET)	Episodes	Date	Viewers (millions)	Date	Viewers (millions)	TV season	Viewership rank	Avg. viewers (millions)	18–49 rank	Avg. 18–49 rating
1	Monday 8:00 pm	22	September 22, 2014	8.21	May 4, 2015	4.93	2014–15	68	7.56	30	2.8
2	Monday 8:00 pm	22	September 21, 2015	4.57	May 23, 2016	3.62	2015–16	89	5.37	47	2.0
3	Monday 8:00 pm	22	September 19, 2016	3.90	June 5, 2017	3.03	2016–17	100	4.52	60	1.6
4	Thursday 8:00 pm	22	September 21, 2017	3.21	May 17, 2018	2.20	2017–18	129	3.69	80	1.2
5	Thursday 8:00 pm	12	January 3, 2019	2.54	April 25, 2019	2.19	2018–19	125	3.68	82	1.1

In early October 2014, market research firm Survata polled more than 1,400 viewers to determine that Gotham was the major TV premiere, out of 24, that viewers were most interested to watch that year.

In Australia the first and second episodes received 1.24 million and 896,000 viewers, respectively. The timeshifted broadcasts were watched by 1.43 and 1.03 million, respectively. The Canadian debut got 3.38 million viewers, making it the second most-watched telecast of the night and week. The UK premiere was watched by 3.20 million viewers. The airings on the 1-hour and 24-hour timeshift channels were watched by 597,000 and 142,000 viewers, respectively. In New Zealand, it was the most-watched program on the network, with 278,540 viewers. The time shifted version was watched by 39,580 viewers.

=== Critical response ===
Season 1 of Gotham received generally positive reviews from critics. Review aggregator Rotten Tomatoes gives the season 1 a rating of 76% based on 613 reviews, with an average rating of 6.85/10. The site's consensus states, "High production values, a talented cast, and an appealingly stylized approach to the Batman mythos help Gotham overcome its occasionally familiar themes." Metacritic gives the season a score of 71 out of 100, based on 34 critics, indicating "generally favorable reviews".

David Hinckley of New York Daily News praised the first episode for playing "like a 45-minute movie, with stunning visuals that never feel like a shrunken TV version of the Batman films against which it will inevitably be measured" and lauded Logue's Harvey Bullock as a scene-stealer. The San Jose Mercury News' Chuck Barney called the pilot "a fun, dark, moody and well-paced first hour" and McKenzie's James Gordon a commanding lead, while saying Jada Pinkett Smith is "an absolute blast to watch." Matt Brennan of Indiewire said that Gotham was "the perfect antidote to superhero fatigue", praising the "bright, pop-inflected aesthetic, with urban backdrops that appear as though cut out from the panels of a comic book."

Jeff Jensen of Entertainment Weekly criticized the first half of season one along with the mid-season premiere. He found the personalities of most of the characters "already nearly fully formed; all they can become is more or less than what they already are." Jensen added that Gordon not being Gotham's redeemer hurt the premise of the show and heavily criticized what he saw as the under-use of Jada Pinkett Smith's character. In the end, he does not see Gotham "as a show for comic book fanboys" but rather as "a post-fanboy, or fanboy-irrelevant." Oliver Sava of The A.V. Club lamented that "there have been dozens of interpretations of Batman and his city in the 75 years since their creation, and Gotham has trouble finding the right balance of influences".

The second season of Gotham received generally positive reviews from critics. On Rotten Tomatoes, the season has a rating of 74% based on 15 reviews, with an average rating of 6.58/10. The site's critical consensus reads, "While still tonally uneven in season two, Gotham is back with a renewed focus, moving away from disjointed case-of-the-week plots into a darker, more stable serialized story." Metacritic gives the season a score of 62 out of 100, based on 6 critics, indicating "generally favorable reviews".

The third season of Gotham received generally positive reviews from critics. On Rotten Tomatoes, the season has an approval rating of 74% based on 9 reviews, with an average rating of 7.4/10. The site's critical consensus reads, "Gotham's third season lets the series' freak flag fly to thrilling effect, but it is far more fun to spend time with the supervillains than virtually any of the other characters".

The fourth season of Gotham received generally positive reviews from critics. On Rotten Tomatoes, the season has an approval rating of 77% based on 22 reviews, with an average rating of 6.89/10. The site's critical consensus reads, "Though at times suffering from a narrative overload that undermines the drama, Gotham's fourth season ends strong, focusing on Bruce Wayne's transition into the beloved hero its audience awaits".

The fifth and final season of Gotham received generally positive reviews from critics. On Rotten Tomatoes, the season has an approval rating of 85% based on 20 reviews, with an average rating of 7.17/10. The site's critical consensus reads, "Gotham concludes in a glorious free-for-all that takes full advantage of the series' dense roster of colorful villains, making for an extended climax that is both daffy and thrilling".

=== Awards and nominations ===
Year	Association	Category	Nominee	Result	Ref.
2014	Critics' Choice Television Awards	Most Exciting New Series	Gotham	Won	
2015	American Society of Cinematographers	Episode of a Regular Series	Christopher Norr "Spirit of the Goat"	Nominated	
2015	American Society of Cinematographers	Television Movie, Miniseries or Pilot	David Stockton "Pilot"	Nominated	
2015	Art Directors Guild	One-hour period or fantasy single-camera television series	Doug Kraner "Pilot," "Selina Kyle," "Arkham"	Nominated	
2015	Gracie Awards	Outstanding Drama	Gotham	Won	
2015	Motion Picture Sound Editors	TV Short Form Music Score	Ashley Revell "Lovecraft"	Nominated	
2015	NAACP Image Awards	Outstanding Supporting Actress in a Drama Series	Jada Pinkett Smith	Nominated	
2015	People's Choice Awards	Favorite New TV Drama	Gotham	Nominated	
2015	People's Choice Awards	Favorite Actor In A New TV Series	Benjamin McKenzie	Nominated	
2015	People's Choice Awards	Favorite Actress In A New TV Series	Jada Pinkett Smith	Nominated	
2015	Saturn Awards	Best Superhero Adaptation Television Series	Gotham	Nominated	
2015	Saturn Awards	Best Performance by a Younger Actor in a Television Series	Camren Bicondova	Nominated	
2015	Creative Arts Emmy Awards	Outstanding Production Design for a Narrative Contemporary or Fantasy Program (One Hour or More)	Doug Kraner "Pilot"	Nominated	
2015	Creative Arts Emmy Awards	Outstanding Costumes for a Contemporary Series, Limited Series or Movie	Lisa Padovani "Under the Knife"	Nominated	
2015	Creative Arts Emmy Awards	Outstanding Sound Editing for a Series	George Haddad "All Happy Families Are Alike"	Nominated	
2015	Creative Arts Emmy Awards	Outstanding Special Visual Effects in a Supporting Role	Thomas Joseph Mahoney "Lovecraft"	Nominated	
2016	People's Choice Awards	Favorite TV Drama	Gotham	Nominated	
2016	Teen Choice Awards	Choice TV Show: Drama	Gotham	Nominated	
2016	Teen Choice Awards	Choice TV Actor: Drama	Benjamin McKenzie	Nominated	
2016	Teen Choice Awards	Choice TV: Villain	Cameron Monaghan	Nominated	
2016	Creative Arts Emmy Awards	Outstanding Cinematography for a Single-Camera Series	Crescenzo Giacomo Notarile "Azrael"	Nominated	
2016	Creative Arts Emmy Awards	Outstanding Sound Editing for a Series	George Haddad "Azrael"	Nominated	
2016	Creative Arts Emmy Awards	Outstanding Stunt Coordination for a Drama Series, Limited Series, or Movie	Norman Douglass	Nominated	
2017	Saturn Awards	Best Superhero Adaptation Television Series	Gotham	Nominated	
2017	Teen Choice Awards	Choice TV Action Show	Gotham	Nominated	
2017	Teen Choice Awards	Choice TV: Villain	Cory Michael Smith	Nominated	
2017	Creative Arts Emmy Awards	Outstanding Sound Editing for a Series	George Haddad "Destiny Calling"	Nominated	
2017	Creative Arts Emmy Awards	Outstanding Special Visual Effects in a Supporting Role	Thomas Joseph Mahoney "Heavydirtysoul"	Won	
2017	Creative Arts Emmy Awards	Outstanding Stunt Coordination for a Drama Series, Limited Series, or Movie	Norman Douglass	Nominated	
2018	Saturn Awards	Best Superhero Adaptation Television Series	Gotham	Nominated	
2018	Saturn Awards	Best Performance by a Younger Actor in a Television Series	David Mazouz	Nominated	
2018	Creative Arts Emmy Awards	Outstanding Special Visual Effects in a Supporting Role	Thomas Joseph Mahoney "That's Entertainment"	Nominated	
2018	Teen Choice Awards	Choice Action TV Show	Gotham	Nominated	
2018	Teen Choice Awards	Choice Action TV Actor	David Mazouz	Nominated	
2018	Teen Choice Awards	Choice TV Villain	Cameron Monaghan	Nominated	
2019	Saturn Awards	Best Superhero Television Series	Gotham	Nominated	
2019	Saturn Awards	Best Performance by a Younger Actor in a Television Series	David Mazouz	Nominated	
2019	Creative Arts Emmy Awards	Outstanding Sound Editing for a Comedy or Drama Series (One-Hour)	George Haddad "I Am Bane"	Nominated	
2019	Teen Choice Awards	Choice Action TV Show	Gotham	Nominated	
2019	Teen Choice Awards	Choice Action TV Actor	Ben McKenzie	Nominated	
2019	Teen Choice Awards	Choice TV Villain	Cameron Monaghan	Won	
2019	American Society of Cinematographers Awards	Regular Series for Commercial Television	David Stockton (for "Ace Chemicals")	Nominated	

== Franchise ==
=== Literature ===
On February 1, 2016, Fox began airing episodes of a five-part motion comic titled Gotham Stories, meant to tie into the series' second season. The first Gotham tie-in novel was published by Titan in January 2017. Dawn of Darkness by Jason Starr is described as an "official prequel" to the TV series, set two months prior to the beginning of the series. The following year, another novel was released written by the same author. Entitled City of Monsters, the book centered around Gordon during the events between seasons 2 and 3 of the series.

=== Prequel series ===
A prequel series, Pennyworth, developed by a returning Bruno Heller and Danny Cannon, and starring Jack Bannon as a younger version of the iteration of Alfred Pennyworth portrayed by Sean Pertwee in Gotham, began airing on Epix in July 2019. A third season, subtitled The Origin of Batman's Butler and loosely adapting V for Vendetta, began airing on HBO Max in October 2022. Later in the month, Heller indicated that he intended for David Mazouz to eventually reprise his role as Bruce Wayne / Batman in a flashforward epilogue in the series finale of Pennyworth, stating that "we had the best Batman out there in David Mazouz. I'll bring him back."

== See also ==
- Bruce Wayne (TV series)
- Batwoman season 3, in which Victoria Cartagena reprises her role as Renee Montoya from Gotham season 1
