= Camren Bicondova =

American actress and dancer (born 1999)

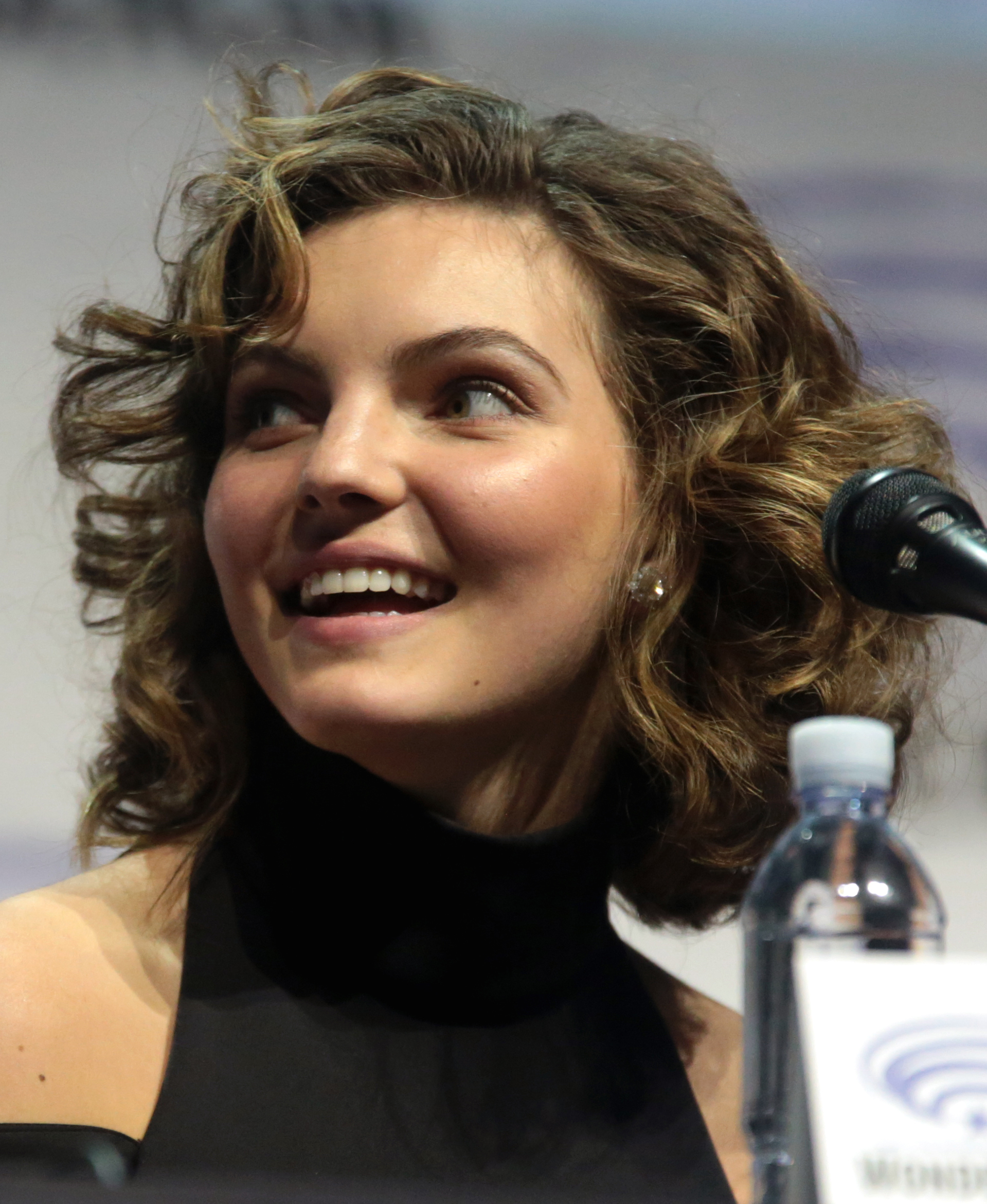
- Bicondova at WonderCon 2017
- Born: Camren Renee Bicondova; May 22, 1999 (age 27); San Diego, California, U.S.
- Occupations: Actress, dancer
- Years active: 2011–present

Camren Renee Bicondova (born May 22, 1999) is an American actress and dancer. She is best known for her role as Selina Kyle / Catwoman on the Fox television crime-drama Gotham (2014–2019).

== Life and career ==
Bicondova was born in San Diego, California. She has stated that she is a third-generation Spanish-American. Bicondova got her start as a performer when she was enrolled in dance class at the age of six. After her family relocated to Hawaii, Bicondova studied at a local studio where she took up jazz-funk and hip hop styles of dance. By age 11, she had become an "Elite protégé" for The PULSE on Tour dance convention, traveling the country as an assistant to some of the nation's top teachers and choreographers.

Bicondova garnered mainstream attention in the 2012 dance-drama film Battlefield America. That same year, her all-girl dance group 8 Flavahz was runner-up in the seventh season of America's Best Dance Crew.

In 2014, Bicondova was cast as the young Selina Kyle on Fox's television series Gotham. She played the role throughout all 5 seasons until the series' conclusion in 2019. She earned a Saturn Award nomination for Best Performance by a Younger Actor in a Television Series for season 1. Also in 2014, she was in the "Enjoy the Ride" music video by Krewella. In September 2015, she was listed in Variety's annual Youth Impact Report, as an artist who "represents the next wave of Hollywood savvy and talent". Later that year, she appeared in the Canadian slasher film Girl House.

In April 2019, Bicondova decided not to appear in the Gotham series finale "The Beginning..." and was replaced by actress Lili Simmons for the 10-year flash forward scenes. Bicondova stated on Twitter that she did not feel comfortable playing a version of her character who was ten years older, and thus decided to let another actress do it instead.

In 2024, Bicondova co-starred in the zombie film Festival of the Living Dead, directed by Jen and Sylvia Soska.

== Personal life ==
Bicondova lives with her Tonkinese cat, named Mr. G.

Bicondova has lent her support to a number of non-profits and charitable causes including The USO, NOH8 Campaign, Global Citizen Festival and North Shore Animal League America.

== Filmography ==
Film roles
Year	Title	Role	Notes
2012	Battlefield America	Prissy	Dance film
2014	Girl House	Girl #1	Film
2021	Chaos Walking	Lola Eade	
2024	Festival of the Living Dead	Iris	

Television roles
Year	Title	Role	Notes
2011	Shake It Up	Little Highlighter	Episode: "Throw It Up"; uncredited
2012	America's Best Dance Crew	Contestant	Season 7; as part of 8 Flavahz
2014–2019	Gotham	Selina Kyle	Main role; 76 episodes

Music video roles
Year	Artist	Title	Role	Notes
2012	Ciara	"Got Me Good"	Backup dancer	
2014	Krewella	"Enjoy the Ride"	Girl	
2018	Dana Vaughns	"UNDERNEATH"	Backup dancer	

== Awards and nominations ==
Year	Award	Category	Nominated work	Result
2015	41st Saturn Awards	Best Performance by a Younger Actor in a Television Series	Gotham	Nominated
