= List of The Mentalist episodes =

The Mentalist is an American crime procedural television series that ran from September 23, 2008, until February 18, 2015, on CBS. The series follows Simon Baker as Patrick Jane, an independent consultant for the California Bureau of Investigation (CBI) based in Sacramento, California and later on for the FBI. He has a remarkable track record for solving serious crimes by using his amazing skills of observation. Jane also makes frequent use of his mentalist abilities and his semi-celebrity past as a psychic medium using paranormal abilities he now admits he feigned. He abandoned his pretense out of remorse when his attention-seeking behavior attracted the attention of a serial killer, Red John, who killed his wife and daughter. With the exception of "Pilot", the first episode, and up through "Red John", the eighth episode of season six, the titles of all episodes refer or allude to "red" (or some shade thereof) as a word, color, or concept. Titles of episodes after this episode refer to different colors (e.g. white, silver, violet, blue, grey, black).

During the course of the series, 151 episodes of The Mentalist aired over seven seasons.

== Series overview ==
| Season | Episodes | Originally released | |
| Season | Episodes | First released | Last released |
|---|---|---|---|
| 1 | 23 | September 23, 2008 | May 19, 2009 |
| 2 | 23 | September 24, 2009 | May 20, 2010 |
| 3 | 24 | September 23, 2010 | May 19, 2011 |
| 4 | 24 | September 22, 2011 | May 17, 2012 |
| 5 | 22 | September 30, 2012 | May 5, 2013 |
| 6 | 22 | September 29, 2013 | May 18, 2014 |
| 7 | 13 | November 30, 2014 | February 18, 2015 |

== Episodes ==
With the exception of the pilot episode and the twenty-first episode of the second season, "18-5-4" = "R-E-D", each Mentalist episode title incorporated various colors. Up to and including the eighth episode of the sixth season "Red John", the titles always included direct or indirect allusions to the color red, including various shades of red or items normally associated with red (e.g. blood, roses, fire). These "red" references served as a reminder of Red John, the mysterious figure responsible for the murder of Patrick Jane's wife and daughter. After the Red John storyline was resolved in "Red John," episode titles would allude to colors outside of red.

=== Season 1 (2008–09) ===
| No. overall | No. in season | Title | Directed by | Written by | Original release date | Prod. code | U.S. viewers (millions) |
|---|---|---|---|---|---|---|---|
| 1 | 1 | "Pilot" | David Nutter | Bruno Heller | September 23, 2008 | 276040 | 15.60 |
| 2 | 2 | "Red Hair and Silver Tape" | David Nutter | Bruno Heller | September 30, 2008 | 3T7801 | 15.48 |
| 3 | 3 | "Red Tide" | David M. Barrett | Ashley Gable | October 14, 2008 | 3T7803 | 14.94 |
| 4 | 4 | "Ladies in Red" | Chris Long | Gary Glasberg | October 21, 2008 | 3T7802 | 15.28 |
| 5 | 5 | "Redwood" | John Behring | Andi Bushell | October 28, 2008 | 3T7804 | 16.07 |
| 6 | 6 | "Red Handed" | Chris Long | Erika Green Swafford | November 11, 2008 | 3T7807 | 16.57 |
| 7 | 7 | "Seeing Red" | Martha Mitchell | Gary Glasberg | November 18, 2008 | 3T7808 | 15.84 |
| 8 | 8 | "The Thin Red Line" | Matt Earl Beesley | Ken Woodruff | November 25, 2008 | 3T7806 | 15.93 |
| 9 | 9 | "Flame Red" | Charles Beeson | Ashley Gable | December 2, 2008 | 3T7810 | 18.74 |
| 10 | 10 | "Red Brick and Ivy" | Paris Barclay | Eoghan Mahony | December 16, 2008 | 3T7805 | 19.31 |
| 11 | 11 | "Red John's Friends" | John Polson | Bruno Heller | January 6, 2009 | 3T7809 | 19.62 |
| 12 | 12 | "Red Rum" | Dean White | Andi Bushell | January 13, 2009 | 3T7811 | 18.07 |
| 13 | 13 | "Paint it Red" | David M. Barrett | Eoghan Mahony | January 18, 2009 | 3T7812 | 16.39 |
| 14 | 14 | "Crimson Casanova" | Lesli Linka Glatter | Ken Woodruff | February 10, 2009 | 3T7813 | 19.70 |
| 15 | 15 | "Scarlett Fever" | Paul Holahan | Erika Green Swafford | February 17, 2009 | 3T7814 | 18.23 |
| 16 | 16 | "Bloodshot" | Chris Long | Gary Glasberg | March 17, 2009 | 3T7815 | 15.49 |
| 17 | 17 | "Carnelian Inc." | Kevin Dowling | Bruno Heller | March 24, 2009 | 3T7816 | 17.62 |
| 18 | 18 | "Russet Potatoes" | Norberto Barba | Ashley Gable | March 31, 2009 | 3T7817 | 16.96 |
| 19 | 19 | "A Dozen Red Roses" | Lesli Linka Glatter | Andi Bushell | April 7, 2009 | 3T7818 | 16.92 |
| 20 | 20 | "Red Sauce" | Adam Kane | Eoghan Mahony | April 28, 2009 | 3T7819 | 17.11 |
| 21 | 21 | "Miss Red" | Martha Mitchell | Ken Woodruff | May 5, 2009 | 3T7820 | 16.68 |
| 22 | 22 | "Blood Brothers" | John Polson | Erika Green Swafford | May 12, 2009 | 3T7822 | 16.21 |
| 23 | 23 | "Red John's Footsteps" | Chris Long | Bruno Heller | May 19, 2009 | 3T7821 | 16.82 |

=== Season 2 (2009–10) ===
| No. overall | No. in season | Title | Directed by | Written by | Original release date | Prod. code | U.S. viewers (millions) |
|---|---|---|---|---|---|---|---|
| 24 | 1 | "Redemption" | Chris Long | Bruno Heller | September 24, 2009 | 3X5351 | 15.07 |
| 25 | 2 | "The Scarlet Letter" | Charles Beeson | Tom Szentgyörgyi | October 1, 2009 | 3X5352 | 15.75 |
| 26 | 3 | "Red Badge" | Eric Laneuville | Ashley Gable | October 8, 2009 | 3X5353 | 14.70 |
| 27 | 4 | "Red Menace" | Norberto Barba | Leonard Dick | October 15, 2009 | 3X5354 | 15.08 |
| 28 | 5 | "Red Scare" | Lesli Linka Glatter | Ken Woodruff | October 29, 2009 | 3X5355 | 15.53 |
| 29 | 6 | "Black Gold and Red Blood" | Rod Hardy | Bruno Heller | November 5, 2009 | 3X5356 | 16.21 |
| 30 | 7 | "Red Bulls" | David M. Barrett | Tom Szentgyörgyi | November 12, 2009 | 3X5358 | 16.17 |
| 31 | 8 | "His Red Right Hand" | Chris Long | Ashley Gable | November 19, 2009 | 3X5359 | 15.85 |
| 32 | 9 | "A Price Above Rubies" | Charles Beeson | Eoghan Mahony | December 10, 2009 | 3X5360 | 16.37 |
| 33 | 10 | "Throwing Fire" | Martha Mitchell | John Mankiewicz | December 17, 2009 | 3X5357 | 15.77 |
| 34 | 11 | "Rose-Colored Glasses" | Dan Lerner | Leonard Dick | January 14, 2010 | 3X5361 | 15.38 |
| 35 | 12 | "Bleeding Heart" | Norberto Barba | Erika Green Swafford | January 21, 2010 | 3X5362 | 14.56 |
| 36 | 13 | "Redline" | Bill D'Elia | Jordan Harper | February 4, 2010 | 3X5363 | 14.68 |
| 37 | 14 | "Blood In, Blood Out" | John Polson | Ken Woodruff | February 11, 2010 | 3X5364 | 15.86 |
| 38 | 15 | "Red Herring" | Eric Laneuville | David Appelbaum | March 4, 2010 | 3X5365 | 14.87 |
| 39 | 16 | "Code Red" | John F. Showalter | Bruno Heller | March 11, 2010 | 3X5366 | 16.02 |
| 40 | 17 | "The Red Box" | Chris Long | John Mankiewicz | April 1, 2010 | 3X5367 | 14.11 |
| 41 | 18 | "Aingavite Baa (Red Water)" | Stephen Gyllenhaal | Tom Szentgyörgyi & Erika Green Swafford | April 8, 2010 | 3X5368 | 16.32 |
| 42 | 19 | "Blood Money" | Adam Kane | Ashley Gable & Jordan Harper | April 22, 2010 | 3X5369 | 14.96 |
| 43 | 20 | "Red All Over" | Roxann Dawson | Carolyn Ingber | April 29, 2010 | 3X5370 | 14.84 |
| 44 | 21 | "18-5-4" | Charles Beeson | Leonard Dick & Ken Woodruff | May 6, 2010 | 3X5371 | 14.85 |
| 45 | 22 | "Red Letter" | John F. Showalter | Eoghan Mahony | May 13, 2010 | 3X5372 | 14.84 |
| 46 | 23 | "Red Sky in the Morning" | Chris Long | Bruno Heller | May 20, 2010 | 3X5373 | 15.22 |

=== Season 3 (2010–11) ===
| No. overall | No. in season | Title | Directed by | Written by | Original release date | Prod. code | U.S. viewers (millions) |
|---|---|---|---|---|---|---|---|
| 47 | 1 | "Red Sky at Night" | Chris Long | Bruno Heller | September 23, 2010 | 3X6401 | 15.50 |
| 48 | 2 | "Cackle-Bladder Blood" | John Polson | Ashley Gable | September 30, 2010 | 3X6402 | 14.65 |
| 49 | 3 | "The Blood on His Hands" | David M. Barrett | Tom Szentgyörgyi | October 7, 2010 | 3X6403 | 14.39 |
| 50 | 4 | "Red Carpet Treatment" | Charles Beeson | Daniel Cerone | October 14, 2010 | 3X6404 | 15.13 |
| 51 | 5 | "The Red Ponies" | John F. Showalter | Eoghan Mahony | October 21, 2010 | 3X6405 | 14.42 |
| 52 | 6 | "Pink Chanel Suit" | Eric Laneuville | Ken Woodruff | October 28, 2010 | 3X6406 | 14.76 |
| 53 | 7 | "Red Hot" | Chris Long | Ashley Gable | November 4, 2010 | 3X6407 | 14.42 |
| 54 | 8 | "Ball of Fire" | Stephen Gyllenhaal | Tom Szentgyörgyi | November 11, 2010 | 3X6408 | 13.84 |
| 55 | 9 | "Red Moon" | Simon Baker | Bruno Heller | November 18, 2010 | 3X6409 | 14.74 |
| 56 | 10 | "Jolly Red Elf" | John F. Showalter | Daniel Cerone | December 9, 2010 | 3X6410 | 13.41 |
| 57 | 11 | "Bloodsport" | Roxann Dawson | Eoghan Mahony | January 6, 2011 | 3X6411 | 14.88 |
| 58 | 12 | "Bloodhounds" | Charles Beeson | Erika Green Swafford | January 20, 2011 | 3X6412 | 14.82 |
| 59 | 13 | "Red Alert" | Guy Ferland | Jordan Harper | February 3, 2011 | 3X6413 | 15.18 |
| 60 | 14 | "Blood for Blood" | Martha Mitchell | David Appelbaum | February 10, 2011 | 3X6414 | 14.86 |
| 61 | 15 | "Red Gold" | Tom Verica | Cindi M. Grossenbacher | February 17, 2011 | 3X6415 | 15.01 |
| 62 | 16 | "Red Queen" | Chris Long | Daniel Cerone | February 24, 2011 | 3X6416 | 14.79 |
| 63 | 17 | "Bloodstream" | Bobby Roth | Erika Green Swafford | March 10, 2011 | 3X6417 | 14.28 |
| 64 | 18 | "The Red Mile" | Darnell Martin | Tom Szentgyörgyi | March 31, 2011 | 3X6418 | 14.27 |
| 65 | 19 | "Every Rose Has Its Thorn" | Charles Beeson | Ken Woodruff | April 7, 2011 | 3X6419 | 15.17 |
| 66 | 20 | "Redacted" | David M. Barrett | Eoghan Mahony | April 28, 2011 | 3X6420 | 13.53 |
| 67 | 21 | "Like a Redheaded Stepchild" | Eric Laneuville | Jordan Harper | May 5, 2011 | 3X6421 | 14.00 |
| 68 | 22 | "Rhapsody in Red" | David M. Barrett | David Appelbaum | May 12, 2011 | 3X6422 | 14.07 |
| 69 | 23 | "Strawberries and Cream (Part I)" | Chris Long | Ashley Gable | May 19, 2011 | 3X6423 | 14.11 |
| 70 | 24 | "Strawberries and Cream (Part II)" | Chris Long | Bruno Heller | May 19, 2011 | 3X6424 | 14.11 |

=== Season 4 (2011–12) ===
| No. overall | No. in season | Title | Directed by | Written by | Original release date | Prod. code | U.S. viewers (millions) |
|---|---|---|---|---|---|---|---|
| 71 | 1 | "Scarlet Ribbons" | Charles Beeson | Bruno Heller | September 22, 2011 | 3X6801 | 13.56 |
| 72 | 2 | "Little Red Book" | Eric Laneuville | Tom Szentgyörgyi | September 29, 2011 | 3X6802 | 12.92 |
| 73 | 3 | "Pretty Red Balloon" | John F. Showalter | Ashley Gable | October 6, 2011 | 3X6803 | 13.15 |
| 74 | 4 | "Ring Around the Rosie" | Chris Long | Daniel Cerone | October 13, 2011 | 3X6804 | 12.39 |
| 75 | 5 | "Blood and Sand" | John Polson | Eoghan Mahony | October 20, 2011 | 3X6805 | 12.54 |
| 76 | 6 | "Where in the World Is Carmine O'Brien?" | Bobby Roth | David Appelbaum | October 27, 2011 | 3X6806 | 12.42 |
| 77 | 7 | "Blinking Red Light" | Simon Baker | Ken Woodruff | November 3, 2011 | 3X6807 | 13.66 |
| 78 | 8 | "Pink Tops" | Tom Verica | Erika Green Swafford | November 17, 2011 | 3X6808 | 12.21 |
| 79 | 9 | "The Redshirt" | Eric Laneuville | Jordan Harper | December 8, 2011 | 3X6809 | 13.04 |
| 80 | 10 | "Fugue in Red" | Randy Zisk | Daniel Cerone | December 15, 2011 | 3X6810 | 13.16 |
| 81 | 11 | "Always Bet on Red" | John F. Showalter | Ashley Gable | January 12, 2012 | 3X6811 | 13.65 |
| 82 | 12 | "My Bloody Valentine" | Elodie Keene | Tom Szentgyörgyi | January 19, 2012 | 3X6812 | 14.22 |
| 83 | 13 | "Red Is the New Black" | Tom Verica | Eoghan Mahony | February 2, 2012 | 3X6813 | 13.87 |
| 84 | 14 | "At First Blush" | Roxann Dawson | David Appelbaum | February 9, 2012 | 3X6814 | 14.68 |
| 85 | 15 | "War of the Roses" | Geary McLeod | Ken Woodruff | February 16, 2012 | 3X6815 | 13.55 |
| 86 | 16 | "His Thoughts Were Red Thoughts" | Charles Beeson | Jordan Harper | February 23, 2012 | 3X6816 | 13.36 |
| 87 | 17 | "Cheap Burgundy" | Bruno Heller | Bruno Heller | March 8, 2012 | 3X6817 | 13.84 |
| 88 | 18 | "Ruddy Cheeks" | Eric Laneuville | Erika Green Swafford | March 9, 2012 | 3X6818 | 11.83 |
| 89 | 19 | "Pink Champagne on Ice" | David Von Ancken | Eoghan Mahony | March 29, 2012 | 3X6819 | 13.62 |
| 90 | 20 | "Something's Rotten in Redmund" | Guy Ferland | Rebecca Perry Cutter | April 5, 2012 | 3X6820 | 12.59 |
| 91 | 21 | "Ruby Slippers" | Kevin Hooks | Daniel Cerone | April 26, 2012 | 3X6821 | 12.03 |
| 92 | 22 | "So Long, and Thanks for All the Red Snapper" | Chris Long | Ashley Gable | May 3, 2012 | 3X6822 | 12.94 |
| 93 | 23 | "Red Rover, Red Rover" | John F. Showalter | Tom Szentgyörgyi | May 10, 2012 | 3X6823 | 12.62 |
| 94 | 24 | "The Crimson Hat" | Chris Long | Bruno Heller | May 17, 2012 | 3X6824 | 13.09 |

=== Season 5 (2012–13) ===
| No. overall | No. in season | Title | Directed by | Written by | Original release date | Prod. code | U.S. viewers (millions) |
|---|---|---|---|---|---|---|---|
| 95 | 1 | "The Crimson Ticket" | Randy Zisk | Bruno Heller | September 30, 2012 | 3X7951 | 11.06 |
| 96 | 2 | "Devil's Cherry" | Randy Zisk | Daniel Cerone | October 7, 2012 | 3X7952 | 9.02 |
| 97 | 3 | "Not One Red Cent" | Chris Long | Ken Woodruff | October 14, 2012 | 3X7953 | 10.74 |
| 98 | 4 | "Blood Feud" | Anton Cropper | Jordan Harper | October 21, 2012 | 3X7954 | 8.10 |
| 99 | 5 | "Red Dawn" | Chris Long | Tom Szentgyörgyi | October 28, 2012 | 3X7956 | 10.17 |
| 100 | 6 | "Cherry Picked" | John F. Showalter | David Appelbaum | November 4, 2012 | 3X7955 | 9.11 |
| 101 | 7 | "If It Bleeds, It Leads" | John F. Showalter | Eoghan Mahony | November 11, 2012 | 3X7957 | 10.15 |
| 102 | 8 | "Red Sails in the Sunset" | Simon Baker | Daniel Cerone | November 18, 2012 | 3X7958 | 8.07 |
| 103 | 9 | "Black Cherry" | Elodie Keene | Erika Green Swafford | November 25, 2012 | 3X7959 | 10.15 |
| 104 | 10 | "Panama Red" | Guy Ferland | Michael Weiss | December 9, 2012 | 3X7960 | 7.94 |
| 105 | 11 | "Days of Wine and Roses" | Eric Laneuville | Rebecca Perry Cutter | January 6, 2013 | 3X7961 | 10.85 |
| 106 | 12 | "Little Red Corvette" | Randy Zisk | Ken Woodruff | January 13, 2013 | 3X7962 | 10.60 |
| 107 | 13 | "The Red Barn" | Allison Anders | Tom Szentgyörgyi | January 27, 2013 | 3X7963 | 10.50 |
| 108 | 14 | "Red in Tooth and Claw" | Randy Zisk | Jordan Harper | February 17, 2013 | 3X7964 | 9.42 |
| 109 | 15 | "Red Lacquer Nail Polish" | Geary McLeod | Eoghan Mahony | March 3, 2013 | 3X7965 | 9.24 |
| 110 | 16 | "There Will Be Blood" | Anton Cropper | Ken Woodruff & David Appelbaum | March 10, 2013 | 3X7966 | 9.52 |
| 111 | 17 | "Red, White and Blue" | Robert Duncan McNeill | Tony Astrino | March 17, 2013 | 3X7967 | 9.98 |
| 112 | 18 | "Behind the Red Curtain" | Chris Long | Erika Green Swafford & Eoghan Mahony | March 24, 2013 | 3X7968 | 8.00 |
| 113 | 19 | "Red Letter Day" | Guy Ferland | Michael Weiss | April 14, 2013 | 3X7969 | 7.84 |
| 114 | 20 | "Red Velvet Cupcakes" | David M. Barrett | Rebecca Perry Cutter | April 21, 2013 | 3X7971 | 9.10 |
| 115 | 21 | "Red and Itchy" | David Paymer | Daniel Cerone | April 28, 2013 | 3X7970 | 8.69 |
| 116 | 22 | "Red John's Rules" | Chris Long | Bruno Heller | May 5, 2013 | 3X7972 | 9.17 |

=== Season 6 (2013–14) ===
| No. overall | No. in season | Title | Directed by | Written by | Original release date | Prod. code | U.S. viewers (millions) |
|---|---|---|---|---|---|---|---|
| 117 | 1 | "The Desert Rose" | Chris Long | Bruno Heller | September 29, 2013 | 4X5601 | 9.70 |
| 118 | 2 | "Black-Winged Redbird" | Robert Duncan McNeill | Tom Szentgyörgyi | October 6, 2013 | 4X5602 | 8.55 |
| 119 | 3 | "Wedding in Red" | Randy Zisk | Daniel Cerone | October 13, 2013 | 4X5603 | 9.38 |
| 120 | 4 | "Red Listed" | Eric Laneuville | Rebecca Perry Cutter | October 20, 2013 | 4X5604 | 7.75 |
| 121 | 5 | "The Red Tattoo" | Tawnia McKiernan | Eoghan Mahony | October 27, 2013 | 4X5605 | 8.82 |
| 122 | 6 | "Fire and Brimstone" | John F. Showalter | Ken Woodruff | November 10, 2013 | 4X5606 | 8.46 |
| 123 | 7 | "The Great Red Dragon" | Elodie Keene | Jordan Harper | November 17, 2013 | 4X5608 | 9.72 |
| 124 | 8 | "Red John" | Chris Long | Bruno Heller | November 24, 2013 | 4X5607 | 10.94 |
| 125 | 9 | "My Blue Heaven" | Simon Baker | Tom Szentgyörgyi | December 1, 2013 | 4X5609 | 9.58 |
| 126 | 10 | "Green Thumb" | Robert Duncan McNeill | Daniel Cerone | December 8, 2013 | 4X5610 | 9.97 |
| 127 | 11 | "White Lines" | Guy Ferland | Ken Woodruff | January 5, 2014 | 4X5611 | 10.22 |
| 128 | 12 | "The Golden Hammer" | James Hayman | Michael Weiss | January 12, 2014 | 4X5612 | 9.58 |
| 129 | 13 | "Black Helicopters" | Randy Zisk | Erika Green Swafford | March 9, 2014 | 4X5613 | 9.95 |
| 130 | 14 | "Grey Water" | Geary McLeod | David Appelbaum | March 16, 2014 | 4X5614 | 8.65 |
| 131 | 15 | "White as the Driven Snow" | Chris Long | Eoghan Mahony | March 23, 2014 | 4X5615 | 8.02 |
| 132 | 16 | "Violets" | J. Miller Tobin | Jordan Harper | March 30, 2014 | 4X5616 | 8.72 |
| 133 | 17 | "Silver Wings of Time" | James Hayman | Tom Szentgyörgyi & Rebecca Perry Cutter | April 13, 2014 | 4X5617 | 9.02 |
| 134 | 18 | "Forest Green" | Eric Laneuville | Jeffrey Hatcher | April 20, 2014 | 4X5618 | 8.65 |
| 135 | 19 | "Brown Eyed Girls" | Sylvain White | Eoghan Mahony & Michael Weiss | April 27, 2014 | 4X5619 | 8.63 |
| 136 | 20 | "Il Tavolo Bianco" | Tom Snyder | Daniel Cerone & Erika Green Swafford | May 4, 2014 | 4X5620 | 8.42 |
| 137 | 21 | "Black Hearts" | Randy Zisk | Ken Woodruff & David Appelbaum | May 11, 2014 | 4X5621 | 8.64 |
| 138 | 22 | "Blue Bird" | Chris Long | Bruno Heller | May 18, 2014 | 4X5622 | 9.69 |

=== Season 7 (2014–15) ===
| No. overall | No. in season | Title | Directed by | Written by | Original release date | Prod. code | U.S. viewers (millions) |
|---|---|---|---|---|---|---|---|
| 139 | 1 | "Nothing But Blue Skies" | Chris Long | Tom Szentgyörgyi | November 30, 2014 | 4X5952 | 10.89 |
| 140 | 2 | "The Greybar Hotel" | Bill Eagles | Jordan Harper | December 7, 2014 | 4X5953 | 8.70 |
| 141 | 3 | "Orange Blossom Ice Cream" | Chris Long | Tom Szentgyörgyi | December 14, 2014 | 4X5951 | 8.37 |
| 142 | 4 | "Black Market" | Michael Nankin | Tom Donaghy | December 21, 2014 | 4X5954 | 8.68 |
| 143 | 5 | "The Silver Briefcase" | Simon Baker | Jordan Harper | December 28, 2014 | 4X5955 | 8.48 |
| 144 | 6 | "Green Light" | Geary McLeod | Alex Berger | January 7, 2015 | 4X5956 | 9.05 |
| 145 | 7 | "Little Yellow House" | Edward Ornelas | Marisa Wegrzyn | January 14, 2015 | 4X5957 | 9.36 |
| 146 | 8 | "The Whites of His Eyes" | Rod Holcomb | Erin Lane Donovan | January 21, 2015 | 4X5958 | 9.60 |
| 147 | 9 | "Copper Bullet" | Tom Snyder | Tom Donaghy | January 28, 2015 | 4X5959 | 9.17 |
| 148 | 10 | "Nothing Gold Can Stay" | Paul A. Kaufman | Alex Berger | February 4, 2015 | 4X5960 | 8.97 |
| 149 | 11 | "Byzantium" | Nina Lopez-Corrado | Jordan Harper & Marisa Wegrzyn | February 11, 2015 | 4X5961 | 9.10 |
| 150 | 12 | "Brown Shag Carpet" | Geary McLeod | Tom Szentgyörgyi | February 18, 2015 | 4X5962 | 10.10 |
| 151 | 13 | "White Orchids" | Chris Long | Bruno Heller & Tom Szentgyörgyi & Jordan Harper | February 18, 2015 | 4X5963 | 10.10 |

== Home video releases ==
| Season | Episodes | DVD release dates | | | |
| Season | Episodes | Region 1 | Region 2 | Region 4 | Discs |
|---|---|---|---|---|---|
| 1 | 23 | September 22, 2009 | March 8, 2010 | September 23, 2009 | 6 |
| 2 | 23 | September 21, 2010 | November 8, 2010 | November 10, 2010 | 5 |
| 3 | 24 | September 20, 2011 | October 10, 2011 | October 26, 2011 | 5 |
| 4 | 24 | September 18, 2012 | October 8, 2012 | November 7, 2012 | 5 |
| 5 | 22 | September 17, 2013 | October 14, 2013 | October 16, 2013 | 5 |
| 6 | 22 | September 30, 2014 | October 20, 2014 | October 8, 2014 | 5 |
| 7 | 13 | April 28, 2015 | July 20, 2015 | February 3, 2016 | 3 |
| Total | 151 | April 28, 2015 | July 20, 2015 | April 6, 2016 | 34 |
