= The Mentalist season 5 =

The Mentalist
- Season 5
- DVD cover
- No. of episodes: 22

Release
- Original network: CBS
- Original release: September 30, 2012 – May 5, 2013

Season chronology
- ← Previous; Season 4 Next → Season 6

The fifth season of the CBS police procedural series The Mentalist premiered on September 30, 2012. As of this season, The Mentalist was scheduled to air on Sundays at 10:00 pm ET. The fourth, eighth and nineteenth episode of this season aired at 11:00 pm ET. The season finale aired on May 5, 2013.

== Cast and characters ==
=== Main cast ===
- Simon Baker as Patrick Jane (22 episodes)
- Robin Tunney as Teresa Lisbon (22 episodes)
- Tim Kang as Kimball Cho (22 episodes)
- Owain Yeoman as Wayne Rigsby (22 episodes)
- Amanda Righetti as Grace Van Pelt (18 episodes)

=== Recurring cast ===
- Emmanuelle Chriqui as Lorelei Martins (4 episodes, one flashback episode)
- Polly Walker as FBI Regional Director Alexa Shultz (2 episodes, one flashback episode)
- Kevin Corrigan as Homeland Security Agent Bob Kirkland (6 episodes, one flashback episode)
- Ivan Sergei as FBI Agent Gabe Mancini (2 episodes)
- Henry Ian Cusick as Thomas Volker (3 episodes)
- Michael Gaston as Gale Bertram (4 episodes)
- Jack Plotnick as Brett Partridge (2 episodes)
- Pruitt Taylor Vince as J. J. LaRoche (3 episodes)

=== Notable guest cast ===
- Catherine Dent as FBI Agent Susan Darcy ("The Crimson Ticket") (flashback episode)
- Drew Powell as FBI Agent Reede Smith ("The Crimson Ticket")
- William Forsythe as Steve Rigsby ("Blood Feud")
- Ian Anthony Dale as Detective Nathaniel Kim ("Red Dawn")
- Gregory Itzin as Virgil Minelli ("Red Dawn") (flashback episode)
- Samaire Armstrong as Summer Edgecombe ("Panama Red")
- Malcolm McDowell as Bret Stiles ("Red Sails in the Sunset")
- Reed Diamond as Ray Haffner ("The Red Barn")
- Robert Picardo as Jason Cooper ("The Red Barn")
- Chris Mulkey as Tom Crayhew ("The Red Barn")
- Dove Cameron as Charlotte Anne Jane ("Devil's Cherry")
- Gigi Rice as Dana Martins, mother of Lorelei and Miranda ("Red Sails in the Sunset")
- Jillian Bach as Sarah Harrigan ("Black Cherry")
- Mary Lynn Rajskub as Susie Hamblin ("Days of Wine and Roses")
- Eddie McClintock as Sgt. Hawkins ("Red, White and Blue")
- Kirk Acevedo as Christian Dos Santos ("Red Dawn")

== Episodes ==
No. overall	No. in season	Title	Directed by	Written by	Original release date	Prod. code	U.S. viewers (millions)
95	1	"The Crimson Ticket"	Randy Zisk	Bruno Heller	September 30, 2012	3X7951	11.06
The CBI team is called to investigate a double homicide but are interrupted by FBI Agents Reede Smith (Drew Powell) and Gabe Mancini (Ivan Sergei). The CBI Sacramento Field Division Office with the CHP Central's Division and the FBI Austin Texas Field Division Office blame each other for botching the Red John case and get into a fight. Director Gale Bertram (Michael Gaston) instructs Jane and Lisbon to mend ways with the FBI. Jane is desperate to keep Lorelei in CBI custody given Red John's admission that he has a friend in the FBI. Jane talks to Lorelei who asks him to kiss her and says she will consider his offer of helping her escape if she hands over Red John. They decide to talk again that evening. The CBI looks into the deaths of Callie and Rex. Callie's sister, Nicola says she doesn't know a Rex and the team finally determine that he was there to fix her computer. Jane cracks the case realising that Callie was murdered for her winning lottery ticket. She found out she had won while Rex was there and when he tried to strangle her, she hit him with a bottle of champagne and he died. Before she passed out, she called 911 and it was the responding officer who suffocated her with a pillow and stole the ticket. The CBI and FBI call a trial to determine who will get Lorelei's custody after the FBI had taken her away. The CBI win but when Jane and Lisbon go to collect her the next morning, they are brought another woman establishing Lorelei has escaped.
96	2	"Devil's Cherry"	Randy Zisk	Daniel Cerone	October 7, 2012	3X7952	9.02
A diamond cutter, Victor, is murdered in his own home and a large blue diamond he was carrying is missing. While at the crime scene, Jane makes a cup of tea with a used teabag that happens to contain belladonna, which causes him to have hallucinations. While under its effects he has conversations with a teenage version of his murdered daughter Charlotte (Dove Cameron) where she repeatedly tells him to stop his obsession with Red John and to work towards having a life. By retracing everything he saw while under the effects of the belladonna, Jane finds clues that help the team solve the murder. Victor's neighbour, Betty (Lee Garlington) tell the CBI that Victor was arguing with someone on the night of his death. The CBI talk to Victor's assistant Julian and find the blue diamond in his bag. He denies knowledge of it though he accepts he was the one arguing with Victor. Charlotte tells Jane she loves him before leaving which indicate that Jane's hallucinations are about to end, leaving Jane devastated. Jane and Lisbon visit Betty where they trick her into thinking she is dosed with belladonna and find her with small diamonds stolen from Victor. She confesses and tells them that she dosed Victor and made him believe that his diamonds were in his stomach leading him to kill himself. Jane is seen making himself a cup of tea while sadly looking out a window, indicating that he most likely ingested belladonna to see his daughter again.
97	3	"Not One Red Cent"	Chris Long	Ken Woodruff	October 14, 2012	3X7953	10.74
A bank is robbed, but in the process, one of the bank employees, Ernie, is shot and killed. The team assumes the robbers killed him, but Jane finds the fact that the door to the security deposit room was opened after the robbery, very suspicious. The CBI are able to link John Hutten to two other robberies and realise that he is the only common member in each robbery crew. Jane senses that Hutten had an inside man on this particular job and finds Ernie was the inside man. His fiance and coworker, Nancy (Katie Walder), refuses to believe. Jane goes through the list of people who have safety deposit boxes in the vault and discovers a connection with Nancy. She confesses that he had lost interest in her so she started snooping and discovered his involvement in the robbery and plan to leave for Brazil without her so she killed him and hid the gun in the safety deposit box. Hutten is indicted based on Ernie's secret email address that Nancy had discovered. Meanwhile, Lisbon gets invited to a poker game by FBI Agent Mancini which includes Deputy Director Bertram, a state senator and the FBI director.
98	4	"Blood Feud"	Anton Cropper	Jordan Harper	October 21, 2012	3X7954	8.10
Rigsby is forced to report to LaRoche (Pruitt Taylor Vince) from the Professional Services Unit when he uses lethal force in a case. He recounts the case - the murder of Andy Huff who has no record. The team realise another person was at the crime scene and left wounded. They find him in a nearby shed and it turns out to be Steve Rigsby (William Forsythe), Rigsby's father, who is seriously wounded. Steve refuses to talk and Lisbon tells Rigsby he can't work the case. Huff's business partner Samantha (Daisy Eagan) tells Lisbon that Huff was Tom Overton's son, a notorious man who ran gangs though Huff was not involved in the family business. The team investigate if the rival Lo Ryder gang may be involved and Van Pelt talks to gym owner Fletcher Moss (Max Martini) who says there are no other gangs. Jane deduces that someone killed Huff to restart the gang war. Steve leaves the hospital so Rigsby tracks him down. The two spend some quality time before the injured Steve dies in his son's arms. Jane and Lisbon visit Moss and Jane devises a plan to bring Sue Overton (of the Overtons) and Beltran (of the Lo Ryders) to the gym for a sit down and they realise that the misunderstanding and Huff's killing was due to Moss who wanted the two gangs to kill each other. Moss makes a run for it and Rigsby chases him and is forced to shoot him dead. LaRoche concludes that Rigsby acted appropriately but it was because of Jane's plan to hold the meeting in a remote place. Jane admits he was the one who called Rigsby to the scene because he feels it may be better to regret something did rather than something he didn't do.
99	5	"Red Dawn"	Chris Long	Tom Szentgyörgyi	October 28, 2012	3X7956	10.17
The episode starts several years ago with Patrick Jane walking into CBI, inquiring about the Red John investigation. He speaks with agent Teresa Lisbon briefly, who rebuffs him, and asks him to schedule a formal meeting. He uses his powers of manipulation to force one of her subordinates, an older agent, to punch him in the nose. For fear of a lawsuit, this prompts agent Minelli to allow Jane access to all of the Red John files. Throughout the episode, Patrick Jane rides along with agent Lisbon as they're attempting to solve a shooting of a state appellate court judge's son, while offering his unsolicited insights. In the end, Patrick Jane forces a corrupt cop to confess to the murder. Minelli, impressed with Jane's performance, hires him as a consultant. FBI agent Alexa Schultz (Polly Walker) calls Minelli and asks him to share the details of the ongoing Red John investigation.
100	6	"Cherry Picked"	John F. Showalter	David Appelbaum	November 4, 2012	3X7955	9.11
The CBI, while on the murder scene of a community security guard, happen to unearth a kidnapping. Investigating, the team learns that it could have been a case of mistaken identity (where a wrong couple is kidnapped). Jane plans and executes an elaborate scheme to catch the suspect, with positive results. Meanwhile, Jane furthers his investigation into the disappearance of Lorelei Martins (the last known confederate of Red John) from the Sacramento County Jail, by interviewing the prisoner transport drivers working at the time. Jane manages to extract a possible lead on the whereabouts of Lorelei, giving him an advantage in the hunt for Red John.
101	7	"If It Bleeds, It Leads"	John F. Showalter	Eoghan Mahony	November 11, 2012	3X7957	10.15
The team investigates the murder of a TV journalist who specialized in "human interest stories". The investigation leads them to a powerful business tycoon she wanted to expose for the genocide of an Amazonian village for financial gain. But the real culprit turns out to be an older TV colleague, whom Jane exposes on air. The tycoon's assistant is killed because she wanted to testify against him, but they can't touch him. Lisbon swears she'll get him someday. Meanwhile, Jane's research on Lorelei leads him to a federal prison that he cannot access due to FBI involving again.
102	8	"Red Sails in the Sunset"	Simon Baker	Daniel Cerone	November 18, 2012	3X7958	8.07
With the help of Bret Stiles, Jane puts a plan into action to get Lorelei Martins out of prison, with the hope that she will lead him directly to Red John. After the successful prison break, the CBI is assisted by Agent Bob Kirkland from Homeland Security and they believe Lorelei has abducted Jane to take him to Red John. On the run, Lorelei and Jane argue and she blurts out that she is surprised Jane and Red John didn't become friends the moment they shook hands. The CBI find Lorelei's estranged mother who tells them about Lorelei's sister Miranda who was sold to a Romanian couple when she was 2 years old. The separation left both sisters broken but they were reunited till 5 years ago when Miranda was raped and murdered. Lorelei takes Jane to her sister's cabin. Jane calls Lisbon about Miranda and she tells him that she found a crime scene photo that had been withheld from the public. Miranda had been left to starve and died of heatstroke but carved out one name before she died - Roy. Jane shows the photo to Lorelei to convince her that Red John killed Miranda to make Lorelei a victim so he could prey on her. Lorelei refuses to believe him but is visibly upset. To win her trust, Jane lets her escape and stages an accident to make it look like she left him injured. Later, an injured Jane tells Lisbon she will never know if he was involved.
103	9	"Black Cherry"	Elodie Keene	Erika Green Swafford	November 25, 2012	3X7959	10.15
Jane looks into new connections to Red John while the CBI team investigates the murder of a real estate agent, Lem, who was a gang member till 2 years ago. Digging into his gang background, Cho meets Agent Tamsin Wade (Monique Gabriela Curnen) of the Rapid Action Task Force who invites him to join the force and Cho agrees. Jane obsessively creates a list of all the people he has met and shaken hands with and who could be Red John.
104	10	"Panama Red"	Guy Ferland	Michael Weiss	December 9, 2012	3X7960	7.94
The death of a young botanist, Jeremy Reese, leads the team into the lucrative world of medical marijuana. Jeremy was working with a secret lab researching marijuana cultivation. He removed some seeds from their facility since that was his work. Jane determines Jeremy was murdered for the seeds and devises a plan by planting the information about a fake marijuana dealer named Olivier Ganz who Jeremy was going to sell his seeds to. Rigsby poses as Ganz to see who will approach Ganz to try and sell the special marijuana seeds called Turbo Wolf. Both Francesca, Jeremy's colleague from the research lab and his mentor from a farm he was working on turn up to try and sell the seeds. His mentor reveals he killed Jeremy to procure the seeds but is told that Francesca had already swapped the real seeds and Jeremy was killed for no reason. During a counterfeit cash bust with the Rapid Response Task Force, Cho runs into a heavily pregnant Summer (Samaire Armstrong) who insists she was there with her friend, Chuck, and didn't know it was a shady deal. She begs him to let her off since her baby's father and fiance has no idea about her past but Agent Tamsin Wade refuses to give in. Cho arrests Chuck and brokers a deal with the D.A. Osvaldo Ardiles (David Norona) to let Summer go free leading to some tension between him and Wade.
105	11	"Days of Wine and Roses"	Eric Laneuville	Rebecca Perry Cutter	January 6, 2013	3X7961	10.85
Jane and the CBI team investigate the death of a model while Lisbon tries to get more evidence on Tommy Volker.
106	12	"Little Red Corvette"	Randy Zisk	Ken Woodruff	January 13, 2013	3X7962	10.60
A week after the killing of Tommy Volker's associate, Charles Milk, the team find the remains of Horatio Jones, a geologist who had been working for one of Volker's firms and was due to testify against Volker two months ago when he went missing. Jane finds a remote-controlled toy car at the crime scene and determines that it is likely a young boy witnessed the murder. DNA evidence shows there was a second killer other than Milk. Jane finally meets Volker and riles him to identify Don Clyde (Steven Bauer), his associate who Jane suspects is the other killer. In the meantime, Lisbon questions Horatio Jones' girlfriend who says their relationship was casual and she didn't know about his work. It turn out she was being threatened by Volker and she promptly leaves the country. CBI pick up Clyde and realise he wasn't able to murder the young boy, Marvin Pettigrew but he refuses to tell them where he hid the boy. CBI lets him go but he gets a call from Volker who knows about his trip to the CBI and Clyde steps in front of a bus and is killed moments later. CBI Media Relations head Brenda Shettrick (Rebecca Wisocky) had been feeding information to Volker which is how Volker was one step ahead of the CBI. Though unwilling, she is forced to share information about Marvin with Volker. When his hired assassin refuses to kill the boy, Volker pursues Marvin himself but is taken down by Lisbon and Marvin is reunited with his mother.
107	13	"The Red Barn"	Allison Anders	Tom Szentgyörgyi	January 27, 2013	3X7963	10.50
Red John and the Visualize cult seem to be connected to a 25-year-old triple homicide at a barn on Elliston Farm. Lisbon's ten-year anniversary with the CBI is celebrated and she is offered a job outside of CBI by Ray Haffner (Reed Diamond) who is starting his own security firm. She declines and chooses to stay, moreover, after learning that Haffner is a member of Visualize, and possibly worked at Elliston Farm where Red John painted his first smiley face. The team talk to Jason Cooper from Visualize and identify the dead as Lester Bradovich, Talbot and Cherney - all members from the 1980s. An ex-member and missionary, Father DiBuono tells them that Bradovich was under pressure from Visualize to turn the farm into a success and was pushing workers hard. There were rumours that Bradovich was giving them drugs which was against Visualize policy. He recognises the Red John smiley face and tells Jane that Talbot told him "a kid" at the farm painted it which helps Jane determine an age range for Red John. Jane cracks the murder case by tricking the killer into confessing but she only shot Bradovich and the other two dead bodies were already there leading the team to believe it was Red John who killed the others. Based on the appearance of the first smiley face and facts from the case, Patrick Jane narrows down his Red John suspect list to 408 names, also adding Haffner.
108	14	"Red in Tooth and Claw"	Randy Zisk	Jordan Harper	February 17, 2013	3X7964	9.42
Jane and the CBI team delves into the cutthroat world of academics in a case involving the death of a college graduate student, Linda, at a natural history museum. Through the use of a ruse on how to develop a photographic memory like Jane has, It is revealed she was killed by another student to prevent her from reporting that he took credit for a new breed of moth she discovered.
109	15	"Red Lacquer Nail Polish"	Geary McLeod	Eoghan Mahony	March 3, 2013	3X7965	9.24
The CBI investigates the murder of an elderly heiress whose remains are found in her dark and spooky mansion. Jane notices some missing knickknacks and, after investigating a vet's disappearance from an assisted living facility for Veterans, the CBI discover the remains were of the missing vet, not the heiress, with the intention for the heiress to fake her death and escape prosecution for embezzling from the Veterans' Home.
110	16	"There Will Be Blood"	Anton Cropper	Ken Woodruff & David Appelbaum	March 10, 2013	3X7966	9.52
In her attempt to find Red John's role in her sister Miranda's death, Lorelei Martins goes rogue and tries to hunt Red John herself. She shoots and kills the manager of a battered-women's shelter for information on her sister's death. Agent Bob Kirkland (Kevin Corrigan) from Homeland Security contacts Lisbon to join forces in their hunt for Lorelei. Regretting Lorelei's violent spree, Jane is forced to re-evaluate his part in her escape with Lisbon. The team investigate Miranda's death leading them to find discrepancies in the records of the battered-home shelter where Miranda stayed briefly. They realise that Lorelei is after another member of the shelter home to exact information on Miranda's death. Jane, forced to stay back at the CBI office by Lisbon, discovers that Lorelei will go after Jason Lennon (Christopher Cousins) identifying his fishing habits and connecting them to the fishing string that was used to bound Miranda. He reaches Lennon before Lisbon as Lorelei incapacitates Rigsby who had been stationed outside Lennon's home. As Lorelei tortures him, Lennon beg for mercy but confronted by Jane's evidence, he laughs and tells them Red John asked him to bring him Miranda and killed her. Jane refers to his deal with Lorelei where she has confirmation of Red John's involvement and would turn herself in but she calls it off and as she is leaving she tells Jane to ask Lennon about Red John as Lennon is weaker. She kisses Patrick one last time and then shoots Lennon as she escapes. Jane is able to keep Lennon alive who is taken to hospital and is in a coma. Homeland Security take over his security. Two weeks later, Jane is called by Lisbon to a crime scene where they find Lorelei murdered by Red John. Jane reflects that though he is sorry, she had it coming.
111	17	"Red, White and Blue"	Robert Duncan McNeill	Tony Astrino	March 17, 2013	3X7967	9.98
A medic, Lucy, from an Army post is found dead with her throat slit and the only witness to the crime is a PTSD patient, Pete (Jesse Luken), who suffers from short-term memory impairment and is unable to testify. The CBI find that Lucy was a stickler for procedure and rules and had been covering for a younger soldier, Rose, who had filed a sexual harassment complaint against Lieutenant Lewis but he has an alibi. The team find a soldier, Martines, who was seeing Lucy as part of his recovery programme and he tells them that he had a minor argument with Lucy when she thought he had forgotten to take his medication but she had assured him she would check again. Jane plants a memory in Pete's psyche that Lucy gave him a key and shows it to all the suspects luring the real killer, Dr. Bowman (Jim Holmes) into a trap. Lucy had discovered a problem while checking Martines' prescription and the doctor knew she would discover that he had been selling drugs under the table to earn extra cash. Cho convinces Sergeant Hawkins (Eddie McClintock) to take a stand and pursue action on the sexual harassment complaint against Lt. Lewis. Jane helps Pete with his memory problems helping him build his memory palace.
112	18	"Behind the Red Curtain"	Chris Long	Erika Green Swafford & Eoghan Mahony	March 24, 2013	3X7968	8.00
The team investigates the murder of an actress, Sharon, working on a musical who was killed the night before the opening of the show and thrown off a balcony. Suspects include the director, producer, and cast members including those who wanted Sharon's job. Her boyfriend tells the team that Sharon had been scared after she was mugged a few days ago and had suspected that someone from the musical was involved. Jane identifies Miranda, in line to replace Sharon, as a cutthroat competitive person and she admits that she and a friend mugged Sharon to throw her off. Using his skills of perception, Jane determines that senior actress, Diandra (Donna Murphy), is in fact Sharon's biological mother and they had reconnected. Diandra tells Jane and Lisbon that she is not an alcoholic, as people suspect her to be, but is suffering from multiple sclerosis and Sharon had gone to the room where she was killed to bring Diandra her medication. Going through crime scene photos, Jane hatches a plan and recruits Agent JJ LaRoche to play a part in his act. LaRoche dresses like Hannover, the apparent sponsor of the play, till producer Dodge (Matt Servitto) vehemently protests confirming Jane's suspicion that there never was a Hannover. Dodge confesses that he had put all his money into the musical and Sharon walked in on him dressing up as Hannover and was going to blow his cover so he killed her. Jane gets a call from the hospital that Lennon is awake. Agent Bob Kirkland asks Lennon if he recognises him and Lennon says he doesn't. Kirkland kills Lennon by injecting air into his IV and tells Jane that Lennon never said a word.
113	19	"Red Letter Day"	Guy Ferland	Michael Weiss	April 14, 2013	3X7969	7.84
The team investigate the death of Hollis Percy who owned the whole town of Percy. Lisbon meets Kirkland for coffee and Jane and Lisbon find his questions about leads on the Red John case odd. Jane and Lisbon meet Hollis' family - widow Joanna and son Ian and are told that the sale of the town had led to tension between Hollis and Francisco Navarro (Harry Groener). Navarro had disagreed with Hollis about selling off property in the town which would have led to the cancellation of his cowboy show. Rigsby checks out a purported meth lab in the woods that had caught fire the same day as Percy was killed. Rigsby realises that it was arson and that the lab was most likely phony. Chief of Police Cook confesses to his involvement but tells them he was only trying to make the place less attractive to mall owners. He tells them that Hollis and Joanna had been arguing. Hollis had been sober for 20 years but had started drinking a month ago. This leads Jane to the fact that something had changed in Hollis' life. The CBI find out that Hollis had an illegitimate daughter that he hadn't known about till later. Jane stages an elaborate play revealing the killer to be Ian Percy (Eyal Podell). Ian had been dating Lily, the bartender at the local pub, something Jane had noticed earlier on. In a drunken state Hollis told Ian that Lily was, in fact, his half sister and proceeded to ridicule his son. An angry Ian then killed his father. Kirkland gets two men to go through Jane's office and his Red John files to find where his investigation has gotten to and tells his agents to not put it on file and that he'll take over from there. Jane realises his office has been broken into when a broken toothpick he had stuck through the door is lying on the ground.
114	20	"Red Velvet Cupcakes"	David M. Barrett	Rebecca Perry Cutter	April 21, 2013	3X7971	9.10
After a woman is killed, the CBI discovers her marriage was having problems and that the husband is having an affair with a dominatrix. They went to a radio show to fix their marriage, and then to private sessions with the show's host/counselor. Van Pelt and Rigsby go undercover as a couple with relationship problems on the radio show. During the show, their true feelings for each other start to come out. After the killer is apprehended, Van Pelt goes to Rigsby's house and they kiss.
115	21	"Red and Itchy"	David Paymer	Daniel Cerone	April 28, 2013	3X7970	8.69
Agent LaRoche personally requests Jane's help when armed robbers break in to his home and steal his prized tupperware box from his safe. LaRoche tells Jane that he has been investigating a securities leak in the CBI and a note was left threatening him to drop the investigation by the end of the day. Thinking that Jane is the only one who knows what's in the box, LaRoche asks him to find it. Jane and Lisbon look into the robbery and track the wife of the locksmith who was shot dead on the scene and discover the other robber to be his wife. She tells them that she got a call and dropped off the box. Rigsby and Van Pelt look into LaRoche's past and find that 9 years ago his mother was raped and assaulted. She committed suicide 3 months later and it is likely that the tupperware box contained evidence related to this incident. Cho finds archives of an old newspaper indicating that someone within the CBI read about the locksmith in the newspaper and paid him to break into LaRoche's home. Jane points out the editor in chief of the newspaper to be CBI Communications Head Brenda Shettrick (Rebecca Wisocky). Jane convinces Lisbon reminding her of Shettrick selling out a young boy to Tommy Volker to use a fake plan to get her to confess. The team convince Shettrick that the Rapid Response Team is going after a drug lord (whom Shettrick was an informant for) and trick her into confessing. Shettrick was an unhappy woman who got thrills from rubbing shoulders with those in power. Jane ensures no one opens the tupperware box and returns it safely to LaRoche. LaRoche tells Jane that the box reminds him of his mother and he keeps it as a warning for himself. When Lisbon asks Jane what was in the box, he says he did not feel the need to violate LaRoche's privacy and he sees him as a man looking for peace. He then requests Lisbon to not disturb him till he comes out of his office as he needs to be alone. Van Pelt tells Lisbon that LaRoche's mother's attacker lives with his mother and Lisbon pays him a visit. She is shocked when she meets a ragged-looking mute Scott Saynay and is told by his mother that one day before his trial someone broke into his room, sedated him and cut off his tongue. The police never found out who it was and never found his tongue.
116	22	"Red John's Rules"	Chris Long	Bruno Heller	May 5, 2013	3X7972	9.17
Red John reappears and kills a young woman named Eileen Turner at a motel. He leaves a phone number on the wall which leads Jane and Lisbon to her social worker, Miriam (Laura San Giacomo). She tells them to find her husband, Roddy Turner as the team also try to determine where Eileen's child, Caitlyn may be. Jane immediately recognises his address as the same as where he lived with his carni folk in Carson Springs. He meets his old friends, Pete (M. C. Gainey) and Samantha, and Roddy is Pete's nephew. Rigsby and Cho apprehend Roddy. Jane realises Eileen was the niece of a man named Sean Barlow who was close with Jane's father. Jane tells Lisbon that he feels like Red John reached into his mind and killed a happy memory, that of Eileen as a young child. Meanwhile, a year later, Jane has finally managed to create a final list of suspects to be Red John, consisting of seven people but is hesitant in sharing the names with an exasperated Lisbon. Jane revisits Pete who tells him Sean Barlow had disowned Eileen and was a violent man. Jane and Lisbon pay Sean Barlow (Michael Hogan) a visit which leaves Lisbon spooked when he reads her and tells her she might be "a little in love with Jane." He also has no alibi for the night of the murder. The maid at the motel who had discovered Eileen's body mentions that she had noticed that all the items for the baby including diapers were gone. Jane and Lisbon go to Eileen's social worker and tell her that they have given out information that Caitlyn was left with her knowing that only the innocent man, genuinely looking for Caitlyn, would show up. However, both Sean and Roddy show up. Jane uses Miriam's phone to call Van Pelt who traces her last call where Jane and Lisbon find Caitlyn. Jane tells her that he realised the person who took away the baby was someone frugal and organised and possibly a woman who wanted a baby. Miriam tells them that she didn't adopt because this way she got to help Red John who has been a good friend to her and it was important to him that it was Eileen. She gives Patrick a CD from Red John. On the way to prison, she swallows a pill killing her. Jane plays the CD for Lisbon - a video of Lorelei Martins reading out a message from Red John where he tells Patrick that he wanted to destroy a happy memory that Jane had told no one about and wanted the investigation to lead Jane to this CD. He says that by making his list Jane had changed the game and now Red John would kill more till one of them catches the other. Calling Lorelei's information about the handshake a lucky break, he then reads out the names he knows are on Jane's list - Bret Stiles (Malcolm McDowell), Gale Bertram (Michael Gaston), Ray Haffner (Reed Diamond), Reede Smith (Drew Powell), Bob Kirkland (Kevin Corrigan), Sheriff Thomas McAllister (Xander Berkeley) and Brett Partridge (Jack Plotnick), leaving Jane visibly angry.

== DVD release ==
All 22 episodes were included on the five disc complete fifth season set. It was released on September 17, 2013 in Region 1, October 14, 2013 in Region 2, and October 16, 2013 in Region 4. It included the featurettes "The Artistry of Action: From Script to Screen" and "Arresting Excitement: Keeping it Real with the CBI".

== U.S. ratings ==
No.	Title	Original U.S. air date	Viewers (in millions)	Rating/Share (Adults 18–49)	Rank (per week)
1	"The Crimson Ticket"	September 30, 2012	11.06	2.1/5	#21
2	"Devil's Cherry"	October 7, 2012	9.02	1.6/4	#24
3	"Not One Red Cent"	October 14, 2012	10.75	2.1/5	#18
4	"Blood Feud"	October 21, 2012	8.10	1.5/5	N/A
5	"Red Dawn"	October 28, 2012	10.17	1.8/4	#23
6	"Cherry Picked"	November 4, 2012	9.11	1.8/6	N/A
7	"If It Bleeds, It Leads"	November 11, 2012	10.15	1.9/5	#17
8	"Red Sails in the Sunset"	November 18, 2012	8.07	1.4/5	N/A
9	"Black Cherry"	November 25, 2012	10.15	1.8/5	#15
10	"Panama Red"	December 9, 2012	7.94	1.6/4	N/A
11	"Days of Wine and Roses"	January 6, 2013	10.85	2.1/6	#8
12	"Little Red Corvette"	January 13, 2013	10.60	2.1/5	#14
13	"The Red Barn"	January 27, 2013	10.50	1.9/5	#14
14	"Red in Tooth and Claw"	February 17, 2013	9.42	1.6/4	#14
15	"Red Lacquer Nail Polish"	March 3, 2013	9.24	1.5/4	#16
16	"There Will Be Blood"	March 10, 2013	9.52	1.7/4	#12
17	"Red, White and Blue"	March 17, 2013	9.98	1.7/4	#13
18	"Behind the Red Curtain"	March 24, 2013	8.00	1.4/4	#23
19	"Red Letter Day"	April 14, 2013	7.84	1.4/5	#24
20	"Red Velvet Cupcakes"	April 21, 2013	9.10	1.6/4	#15
21	"Red and Itchy"	April 28, 2013	8.69	1.6/4	#21
22	"Red John's Rules"	May 5, 2013	9.17	1.7/5	#20
