= Red John (The Mentalist episode) =

- The Mentalist episode
- Episode no.: Season 6 Episode 8
- Directed by: Chris Long
- Written by: Bruno Heller
- Production code: 4X5607
- Original air date: November 24, 2013

Guest appearances
- Michael Gaston as Gale Bertram; Rockmond Dunbar as Dennis Abbott; John Bregar as Agent Mullins; Kamala Lopez-Dawson as Woman in chapel; Joe Nieves as Oscar Cordero; Xander Berkeley as Sheriff Thomas McAllister/Red John

Episode chronology
← Previous "The Great Red Dragon"	Next → "My Blue Heaven"
- The Mentalist (season 6)

"Red John" is the eighth episode of the sixth season of The Mentalist, and the 124th episode overall. Written by series creator Bruno Heller and directed by longtime director and executive producer Chris Long, the episode marks the conclusion to the series' long-running Red John storyline, which had been developing for the entirety of the series. It is also the final episode of the series to incorporate the word or concept of the color red into the episode's title. "Red John" originally aired on CBS on November 24, 2013.

In the episode, Patrick Jane finally comes face-to-face with Red John, the serial killer he has hunted for ten years following the man's murder of Jane's wife and daughter. Meanwhile, the California Bureau of Investigation (CBI) falls under the pressure of an FBI investigation on the team.

== Plot ==
Lisbon (Robin Tunney) walks into an empty office currently being cleared out by the FBI. Supervisory Agent Dennis Abbott (Rockmond Dunbar) gathers Lisbon and the rest of her team to explain that they are now under federal investigation due to the likelihood of them also being criminals alongside CBI director Gale Bertram (Michael Gaston), who is publicly believed to be Red John.

At a gas station, Bertram calls Jane using a payphone, but their conversation is cut short when a police officer recognizes Bertram. Bertram's accomplice Oscar Cordero (Joe Nieves) shoots the officer dead and the two leave.

Abbott is unsuccessful in his team's raid of Jane's attic in the CBI. Lisbon insists she doesn't know Jane's whereabouts and leaves, only to be greeted by the rest of her team in the parking lot. Aware of the investigation, they're laying low, and inquisitive on Jane's whereabouts. Lisbon reminds them of the new dangers imposed around them. Lisbon then goes to see Jane at a park, and Jane briefs her on the situation while still remaining evasive. Aware that the FBI is attempting to trace his phone, he pays a random biker $300 for his phone plus a replacement. Calling Bertram, the two arrange a meeting at Alexandria's cemetery, where Jane's family was buried. Ignoring Lisbon's warnings, Jane takes her gun and car keys and leaves. The FBI, meanwhile, have arrived and catch up with an escaping Jane. The team ambushes him and rams his car.

Jane pleads with Abbott to give him one hour, soon backed up by Lisbon. Abbott, still suspecting Jane's corruption, catches onto their urgency. Cho (Tim Kang), Rigsby (Owain Yeoman) and Van Pelt (Amanda Righetti) arrive and hold Abbott at gunpoint, countering him by inquiring whether he too is a member of the corrupt Blake Association. Abbott insists that he isn't, but is unable to provide them with proof amid the setting and circumstances. He is forced to let Jane go but arrests the team shortly afterwards. Jane, on the other hand, misdirects the FBI by allowing a few teenagers to steal Lisbon's tracked car, and hitches a ride to the cemetery.

Arriving at the cemetery's church, Jane, inside, is greeted by Bertram, who goes on to claim that he is not Red John, nor is he even among the Blake Association's higher ranks. However, reluctantly deeming Jane a loose end, he orders Jane killed. Cordero, however, also under orders from Red John, shoots Bertram instead, prompting the real Red John to enter the church: Sheriff Thomas McAllister (an uncredited Xander Berkeley), previously believed to have perished in the explosion in Jane's house at the end of the episode "Fire and Brimstone". Greeting each other, McAllister brags to and berates Jane, gloating over how he was able to survive and also find out the names on Jane's list of suspects. While admitting that he never figured out how Red John knew the names, Jane does disclose his knowledge on McAllister's survival: two bombs went off in his house, one being a concussion bomb that allowed for Red John to drag Jane, Reede Smith and Bertram out of the way before a second lethal bomb killed Bret Stiles and Ray Haffner. McAllister faked his own death by placing a body with falsified DNA evidence provided to him by the now-deceased Brett Partridge. McAllister, impressed, allows Jane to "show him something", only to be attacked by a pigeon Jane hid under his sleeve (taking advantage of McAllister's previously-displayed phobia of the creature). Jane brandishes a gun he had hidden in the church and shoots McAllister in the abdomen and Cordero dead. As Jane relishes having McAllister—whom he finally acknowledges as Red John—at his mercy, he is interrupted by a woman (Kamala Lopez-Dawson) who tries to persuade him to spare McAllister. When Jane tries to get her to leave, she attacks Jane with a knife. Using the distraction to escape, McAllister runs away while Jane overpowers the woman and takes pursuit.

While Abbott's team finds a dead Bertram in the church, Jane pursues Red John through the cemetery, a neighborhood, a playground and over to a park bordering a pond, where McAllister loses stamina and succumbs to his wounds. When McAllister tries to call 911, Jane kicks away his phone and straddles him. McAllister desperately begs for mercy, claiming that he is in fact a real psychic and thus knew the names on Jane's list; a dismissive Jane puts a hand to Red John's throat and has him blink once for "no" and twice for "yes" to answer two questions: if he's sorry for murdering Jane's family, and if he is afraid to die. McAllister blinks twice for both questions. Jane, satisfied with his answers, goes through with his revenge and strangles McAllister to death. He then uses McAllister's phone to leave a message to Lisbon letting her know his quest for vengeance is complete and that he will miss her. Jane then discards the phone and flees the crime scene for parts unknown.

== Production ==
"Red John" is written by series creator Bruno Heller and directed by executive producer Chris Long. This marks Heller's nineteenth episode for the series and Long's twenty-second.

=== Heller and Baker's response ===
Bruno Heller and star Simon Baker did an interview with Entertainment Weekly discussing the events of the episode and the series' future. Here, Heller disclosed that he only decided on Red John's identity "over the last couple years" and it seemed like the "natural correct choice". When answering as to why he decided on Jane killing Red John, Heller stated, "It was about giving Patrick Jane exactly what he has hunted for all these years", calling it "real and honest and visceral". In a separate interview with TV Guide, Baker commented on the setting, saying "It just had to be the two of them", and describing it as "almost like a love scene". Baker stated, "There is no human act more intimate — not even sex — than killing another human being with your bare hands and watching him die. It is really subversive for a network series. The risk is huge." Heller also stated to Entertainment Weekly that he and Baker were initially in a disagreement over Red John's fate. He further said about Red John's identity that "once the curtain is drawn back from these evil Wizard of Oz characters they tend not to be very interesting dinner companions" and that "ideally you want it to be Sean Connery with horns and a tail in a cave, but that guy doesn’t exist." However, when asking if he was satisfied with Red John's identity, Baker replied, "I was eventually satisfied with the way I killed him — how about that?"

Addressing the future of the series and how Red John's end will affect Jane, Heller stated:

"Jane is this tragic figure who has gotten his heart’s desire. He’s found the sort of evil Grail he’s been chasing all these years, but what does that do to him as a person? Can he begin a new life? And what kind of life does he want for himself, and how will he define himself, now that that part of his life is over? … this fresh version of the show is about what happens afterwards. In a very real sense, he’s a happier person, a weight has been taken off his shoulders. In that way, a weight has been taken off the show. So it’s going to be the same show, to some degree, but a show with less darkness at the edges, and more freedom to roam. Jane has more freedom and a sense of possibility and liberty."

In his interview with TV Guide, Baker also revealed that he provided the voice of Red John in his past appearances and played the costumed character in season 2's "Red Sky in the Morning".

=== Berkeley's response ===
In an interview with TV Guide, Xander Berkeley disclosed details of the process of his casting as Red John and his thoughts. Saying he was "stunned and flattered" and that "earning this little place in pop-culture history was the last thing [he] ever expected", Berkeley stated that he was only informed of the role earlier during season 6. Berkeley said that Red John's death was the "perfect way to go out", and also said that the chase preceding Red John's death was filmed in numerous locations in California including Hollywood, Pomona, Pasadena, and Whittier. Berkeley also named Red John as the most evil antagonist he has played among his frequent place in the position during his career.

== Reception ==
=== Critical reception ===
"Red John" deeply polarized critics and audiences alike, though the latter of which leaned further towards the positive side than the former. While negativity generally sprouted from imbalances in the episode and disappointment over Red John's identity, critics praised the performances of Baker and Berkeley, the score, as well as Red John's death scene. In his review for Entertainment Weekly, James Hibberd expressed disappointment over the reveal, calling McAllister "shockingly dull" and comparing the story with the film Seven, in which the mystery of John Doe carried on for a few hours as opposed to the series' "100 hours and five years", which he deemed "maddening". While acknowledging that a degree of disappointment was inevitable, Hibberd was dismissive towards Heller's remarks that "once the curtain is drawn back from these evil Wizard of Oz characters, they tend not to be very interesting dinner companions", noting times when mystery villains can indeed be compelling, including Bradley Whitford's character from the season 3 finale "Strawberries and Cream". However, Hibberd was positive about Red John's death, saying Baker "rocked" the scene and praising how the scene ignored the common TV cliché of having the protagonist be "above murder." He declared Red John's death as satisfying.

Mack Rawden of CinemaBlend was more positive in his review of the episode, feeling that Red John's identity made sense and saying McAllister had a "menacing voice". Rawden also expressed satisfaction over Jane's killing of Red John, found the episode to have balance, and appreciated the series' freedom for its future. Shaunna Murphy of Hollywood Life, while acknowledging the inevitable disappointment and calling McAllister the "sacrificial lamb for fans to hate on", described both Red John's death and Baker's performance as "remarkable".

=== Ratings ===
Upon its original airing, "Red John" attracted 10.94 million viewers and a 1.6/4 ratings share within adults aged 18–49.
