= Strawberries and Cream (The Mentalist) =

- The Mentalist episodes
- Episode nos.: Season 3 Episodes 23/24
- Directed by: Chris Long
- Written by: Ashley Gable (Part I); Bruno Heller (Part II)
- Production code: 3X6423/3X6424
- Original air date: May 19, 2011

Guest appearances
- Michael Gaston as Gale Betram; Pruitt Taylor Vince as J. J. LaRoche; Aunjanue Ellis as Madeleine Hightower * Eric Winter as Craig O'Laughlin; Rebecca Wisocky as Brenda Shettrick; David Norona as Oscar Ardiles; Jesse Lee Soffer as Alan Dinkler; Ravi Kapoor as Anthony Gupta; Bradley Whitford as Timothy Carter

Episode chronology
← Previous "Rhapsody in Red"	Next → "Scarlet Ribbons"
- The Mentalist (season 3)

"Strawberries and Cream" is the two-part season finale of the third season of The Mentalist. It is the 23rd and 24th episode of the season and the 69th and 70th episode of the series overall. Part one was written by executive producer Ashley Gable and part two was written by series creator and executive producer Bruno Heller. Both parts were directed by executive producer Chris Long and premiered on May 19, 2011 on CBS.

In the episode, Patrick Jane and the CBI unit investigate a seemingly unsuccessful attempt at a gas station bombing. When it becomes clear that Jane's nemesis, the serial killer Red John, is involved, Jane and Lisbon reveal that there is a mole within the CBI working for Red John and that their ex-boss Madeline Hightower, now in hiding, is innocent of a murder. While Rigsby, Cho and Van Pelt attempt to protect Hightower long enough for her to turn herself in, Jane executes an elaborate scheme that could expose Red John's mole and potentially draw out the notorious murderer himself.

== Plot ==
=== Part one ===
A very nervous-looking man (Jesse Lee Soffer) pulls up to JD's Gas & Go Food Mart in Sacramento in his car. He approaches the station's attendant, Gupta (Ravi Kapoor), but is spotted by two police officers. The man reveals that he is strapped to a bomb, which detonates in the ensuing standoff. The investigation by the California Bureau of Investigation reveals that the man, identified as Alan Dinkler, was coerced (with the bomb strapped onto him) into robbing his employers, a Cash In Motion payday loan establishment, of $50,000.

Jane (Simon Baker) deduces that the stolen cash was a ruse to hide the real item of interest in the robbery: CDs containing client transaction records. When Lisbon (Robin Tunney) and Jane check out the gas station, Gupta tells them Dinkler was trying to get to the bathroom. They enter the bathroom and find the code "AD-297A6 WINDSOR" written on the wall, which they guess refers to a geographic location.

Lisbon pursues possible locations that the code may point to and ends up at the abandoned Windsor High School. Jane follows her there and finds her unconscious and strapped to a bomb. She receives a call from a person speaking through a voice changer who instructs her to obtain the stolen CDs from CBI headquarters and deliver them to the speaker. Jane pretends to follow the demands, but drives Lisbon to the gas station instead, and they find that the one behind the set-up was Gupta. After a standoff, Jane disarms Gupta and takes the detonator for the bomb, and the CBI arrives to arrest him. However, he somehow manages to free himself from his handcuffs in the car and attempts to flee, forcing LaRoche (Pruitt Taylor Vince) to shoot and kill him.

It is later revealed that Jane figured out the code in the bathroom was fake, since the bomber could have directed the victims strapped to bombs via cell phone and wouldn't have needed written codes. Dinkler arrived at the gas station to deliver the CDs to Gupta, but the plan went awry when the police showed up and Gupta set off the bomb. With the CDs now in CBI possession as evidence, Gupta set up a trap to get a CBI agent to retrieve the CDs for him.

The CBI discovers that one of the clients on the list in the CDs, Max James, had been found murdered just hours prior. While searching James' house, the agents deduce that he was tortured to death by Gupta, who wanted information from him, before the Dinkler incident. They find a photo of James with Madeleine Hightower and realize they are relatives, which immediately alerts Jane that Red John is behind everything and is hunting Hightower.

Jane returns to the motel room where he has been staying and Hightower (Aunjanue Ellis) seeks him out.

=== Part two ===
Hightower reveals that James was her cousin, and had been sending her money, which explains why Red John was after the transaction records. She fears for her safety and that of her children, and has decided to turn herself in. Jane asks her to give him two days. He enlists the help of Lisbon, Rigsby (Owain Yeoman), Cho (Tim Kang) and Van Pelt (Amanda Righetti) in a scheme to find Red John's mole in the CBI.

He manages to obtain the list of suspects in the Todd Johnson murder case from LaRoche through a bluff: Assistant District Attorney Osvaldo 'Oscar' Ardiles (David Norona), CBI director Gale Bertram (Michael Gaston), FBI agent Craig O'Laughlin (Eric Winter), Van Pelt's fiance, and CBI media relations coordinator Brenda Shettrick (Rebecca Wisocky). Jane also suspects LaRoche. In an elaborate canary trap scheme, the agents inform each suspect of Hightower's location, leading each to believe Hightower is in a different room at the Pacific Palms Hotel. Jane and the CBI install cameras in each room, allowing them to watch which room the assassin sent by Red John enters and find the identity of the mole.

The plan works and they catch the assassin on camera entering room 605, designated to Bertram. As the assassin readies her tools, including a rope and weights, Rigsby and Cho burst into the room, but before they can apprehend her, she jumps off the room's balcony to her death.

The following day, Van Pelt invites O'Laughlin to accompany her to her shift guarding Hightower, relieving Lisbon. Meanwhile, Jane invites Bertram to the mall under the pretense of meeting Hightower to discuss turning herself in, hoping to lure out Red John. When Hightower doesn't show up, Bertram gets irritated and suggests Jane has "reached the end of his rope," which prompts Jane to realize that the assassin in the hotel planned to use the rope to climb down from the balcony of room 605 and enter room 505 – the room designated to O'Laughlin.

O'Laughlin and Van Pelt arrive at the house where Hightower is being hidden. Jane tries to warn Lisbon, but is too late, as O'Laughlin enters and shoots Lisbon’s left shoulder. However, she recovers fast enough to throw a cushion at O'Laughlin, who is then shot and killed by Hightower and Van Pelt.

Jane instructs Lisbon to hit redial on O'Laughlin's cellphone and tell the person who answers that O'Laughlin is dead. When Lisbon dials, the phone belonging to a man reading a newspaper (an uncredited Bradley Whitford) at a table in the mall near Jane rings, and he picks up and responds "Never mind. You win some, you lose some, I guess." When Lisbon tells Jane that the person she spoke to on O'Laughlin's phone said the same thing, Jane realizes the man is Red John. He confronts him, and the two converse, with Red John pointing a concealed gun at Jane. As he is about to leave, Red John reveals unpublished knowledge about the murder of Jane's wife and daughter. Jane then kills Red John with a gun hidden in his pocket.

The episode ends with Jane casually sitting back down to finish his tea, before surrendering to armed security officers who rush to the scene.

== Production ==
"Strawberries and Cream (Part 1)" was written by Ashley Gable and part two was written by Bruno Heller. The first part was Gable's ninth episode for the series, while the second was Heller's twelfth. It was also the twelfth and thirteenth episodes for director Chris Long.

=== Speculation about the ending ===
Since the finale aired, fans and television critics alike have speculated as to whether or not the man in the mall really was Red John. In an interview with Entertainment Weekly, creator Bruno Heller further added to the speculation by saying, "Jane wanted to know if this was Red John or not. And the guy gave him proof that he was. The question remains: Was that Red John? The larger question is: How does Jane get away with murder?" Heller went on to say, "What you get from that scene is what you should get. The viewer is supposed to be convinced. Patrick Jane is certain it's Red John... Thing is, Red John is a master of the mind game. If Red John wanted to die, maybe this is how he wanted to die. Or maybe he just wants Jane to think he's dead." When asked whether or not this meant the end of the Red John storyline, Heller simply said, "Well, look at it this way. If you... killed your worst enemy, would that be the end of the story? No. It would be the beginning of a whole different story."

== Reception ==
=== Critical reviews ===
The episode was met with very positive reviews. Christine Orlando from TV Fanatic awarded the episode 4.8 stars out of five, saying in her introduction: "Wow! The Mentalist season finale gave us some serious closure on Red John with twists, turns—and an ending I didn't see coming..." She called the opening scene "terrifying" and appreciated a scene in which Lisbon prays, saying "I liked that Lisbon's Catholicism was brought into play... it was nice to see Jane take control in those moments, letting her know she wasn't alone." In his review, Jeff Jensen from Entertainment Weekly called the final scene "game changing" and "epic", particularly praising Bradley Whitford's performance as "scary-good" and going on to say, "When Whitford put on the creepy high voice that Red John has used to speak with Patrick in the past, I was chilled. And sold."

=== Ratings ===
Upon its original broadcast, "Strawberries and Cream" garnered 14.11 million viewers and a 2.8/7 ratings share in adults aged 18–49. This is down slightly from the 15.22 million viewers and the 3.2 ratings share achieved by "Red Sky in the Morning", the second season finale. "Strawberries and Cream" was the seventh most watched program of the week.
