= Ashley Gable =

American screenwriter and producer

- Born: United States
- Occupations: Screenwriter; producer
- Years active: 1996–present

Ashley Gable is an American screenwriter and producer who has worked on a variety of well-known television series including Buffy the Vampire Slayer and Person of Interest. She was an executive producer on the CBS crime drama The Mentalist for its first four seasons.

== Career ==
Gable's television career began in 1996 when she was recruited onto the writing staff of the first season of Joss Whedon's Buffy the Vampire Slayer. She (and her then-writing partner Thomas A. Swyden) wrote two of the twelve episodes for the season.

Gable has worked on a number of other shows as a writer and producer, including The Invisible Man, Family Law, The Division, Strong Medicine, Crossing Jordan, New Amsterdam and Vegas. In 2008 she was hired to work on The Mentalist as a co-executive producer under creator Bruno Heller and became an executive producer. She left that show after four seasons and subsequently served as co-executive producer on the CBS drama series Person of Interest.

In 2019, Gable joined other WGA members in firing her agents as part of the Guild's stand against the ATA after the two sides were unable to come to an agreement on a new "Code of Conduct" that addressed the practice of packaging.

Upon discovering that she was earning two-thirds of what her fellow male executive producers were making, Gable became vocal in the #NotWorthLess social media movement, which called for the end to payment inequities between white, male Hollywood writers and producers, and their female, non-white counterparts.

In November of 2022, Gable, a board member of the Writers Guild of America, was named as a member of the committee that will negotiate the guild’s contracts amidst the threat of a writers strike.

== Filmography ==
=== Film ===
Year	Title	Role	Note
2024	The Bad Guardian	Writer	

=== Television ===
==== Buffy the Vampire Slayer episodes ====
- 1.08 "I, Robot... You, Jane"
- 1.11 "Out of Mind, Out of Sight"

==== The Mentalist episodes ====
- 1.03 "Red Tide"
- 1.09 "Flame Red"
- 1.18 "Russet Potatoes"
- 2.03 "Red Badge"
- 2.08 "His Red Right Hand"
- 2.19 "Blood Money"
- 3.02 "Cackle-Bladder Blood"
- 3.07 "Red Hot"
- 3.23 "Strawberries and Cream (Part 1)"
- 4.03 "Pretty Red Balloon"
- 4.11 "Always Bet on Red"
- 4.22 "So Long, And Thanks for All the Red Snapper"
