= Red John =

Fictional serial killer

- The Mentalist character
- Xander Berkeley as Red John
- First appearance: "Red Hair and Silver Tape"
- Last appearance: "Red John"
- Portrayed by: Xander Berkeley; Simon Baker (Voice, in "Red Sky In The Morning", "The Crimson Hat", "Wedding in Red" and "The Desert Rose")

In-universe information
- Full name: Thomas McAllister
- Aliases: Roy Tagliaferro; Dr. Joe N.H.; Jay Roth
- Gender: Male
- Occupation: Sheriff of Napa County, California
- Nationality: American

Thomas McAllister, known as Red John (1962/63 – 2013) is a fictional character and the primary antagonist of the CBS crime drama The Mentalist for the first five seasons and in the first half of the sixth season. As a serial killer, he is believed to have begun his killing spree in 1988, and has, with his operatives and acolytes, killed more than 70 people in California, Nevada, and Mexico. Five years prior to the action of the first episode, he murdered the wife and daughter of Patrick Jane (Simon Baker), making Jane his dedicated nemesis.

In the third season finale, "Strawberries and Cream (Part 2)", Jane encounters a man (Timothy Carter, played by Bradley Whitford) in a shopping mall who convinces him he is Red John and whom he subsequently kills. However, after this cliffhanger episode, over the course of the first several episodes of season four, Jane determines that Carter, although a psychopathic killer himself, was not Red John, but one of the killer's many operatives. In the sixth season episode "Red John", the eponymous serial killer's identity is revealed to be Thomas McAllister, the sheriff of Napa County, portrayed by Xander Berkeley. After unmasking himself to Patrick Jane, McAllister discloses that he is the founder and overall leader of the secret organization known as the Blake Association.

TV Guide included Red John in its 2013 list of "The 60 Nastiest Villains of All Time".

== Character profile ==
Patrick Jane relentlessly pursues Red John, and ultimately in season 5 narrows his list of suspects to seven. The number of people in series who claim to have met "Red John" is limited. Although Jane learns that he has met Red John and shaken his hand at some point, he only discovers Red John's true identity midway through the sixth season.

Bruno Heller, show's creator, has said that Red John isn't a "pathetic loser who is hiding out in a basement somewhere", and that Jane is "not fighting the Green River Killer. He's fighting Moriarty." In addition, "Jane and the audience are coming to the gradual realization that this is a much larger task than it seemed at first. It's like those Amazon tribesmen who throw spears at passing airplanes, then come to realize those planes are the seeds of a much larger civilization that is coming down on them." Like Moriarty, Red John has a network of agents, willing to kill or to die for him. In a radio interview Heller has also stated: "Red John is really just a personification of death, I mean it's that simple. Patrick Jane is very much alive and is very much about being alive in the face of death. And Red John is the fate that awaits us all in the end."

=== Smiley face and other signatures ===
"The Face"

As part of his criminal signature, Red John draws a smiley face on the wall with the blood of the victim—always clockwise (except when it was portrayed in skywriting in "Red John's Footsteps"), using the three fingers of his rubber-gloved right hand.

== Tyger Tyger Conspiracy: The Blake Association ==
In the second season's finale episode "Red Sky in the Morning", a William Blake theme is introduced, when a person, who is believed at the time to be Red John, saves Patrick Jane from being killed under the direction of deranged slasher movie makers Ruth and Dylan. Jane is tied with saran wrap to a chair and, while he is immobilized, Red John recites the first verse of the William Blake poem "Tyger Tyger":

Tyger! Tyger! burning bright
In the forests of the night
What immortal hand or eye
Could frame thy fearful symmetry?

== Appearances, accomplices, and copycats ==
=== Face-to-face ===
At the start of the series, Red John was initially known as simply a serial killer who tortured and murdered mostly women, with at least eleven confirmed victims by the series' premiere. However, Red John's persona would become much more mysterious as any individual who would come close to disclosing any crucial information regarding the killer to Jane would wind up dead themselves, implying that Red John is far more than just an average serial killer and has deep connections throughout the state.

It would later be revealed that Red John has a multitude of followers who see him as a savior who gave their life a purpose and willingly aid him in his various plans and murders in gratitude for what he gives them, which can range from a new life, an occupation, or some form of compensation. His followers do not simply aid him, but worship him and willingly give their lives for his cause, refusing to ever reveal any information about their leader or how they met him. Jane soon realizes that Red John is more powerful than he could ever imagine, having connections in law enforcement and an entire cult of brainwashed followers under his complete control and at his beck and call.

=== Todd Johnson and Red John impersonator ===
In the episode "Red Moon", Jane exposes an EMT, Todd Johnson (Josh Braaten), as a serial cop killer. After being locked in a holding cell in the CBI headquarters, Johnson says he will only talk to Jane, as he claims only Jane will understand what he has to say. When the guard returns with Jane, Johnson has been set aflame and is writhing on fire. On his deathbed, Johnson says "Tyger, Tyger" to Jane, indicating he is in some way connected to Red John.

=== Carter's death and Red John still at large ===
In the final episode of the third season, a man named Timothy Carter (Bradley Whitford) tells Jane that he is the real Red John, prompting Jane to kill him. In reference to the third season finale, the series creator, Bruno Heller, has stated: "What you get from that scene is what you should get. The viewer is supposed to be convinced. Patrick Jane is certain it's Red John... The thing is, Red John is a master of the mind game. If Red John wanted to die, maybe this is how he wanted to die. Or maybe he just wants Jane to think he's dead."

=== James Panzer and Susan Darcy's investigation ===
By the episode "Blinking Red Light", it is now widely believed that Red John is dead, with Jane and Lisbon the only ones aware he is still alive. One of the people believing Red John to be dead is James Panzer, a blogger pretending to devote his life to find a serial killer known as "the San Joaquin Killer" (abbreviated SJK, who has killed at least five young women). In reality, Panzer is the killer. Jane suspects Panzer but initially lacks the proof to expose him.

Panzer makes bold statements that the SJK killings were the work of a genius and Red John by comparison is a "common sociopath, lazy, sloppy, delusional" and already forgotten since Jane killed him. Panzer then makes the same mistake made by Jane and Kristina Frye: belittling Red John in a public forum. A couple of hours after the television appearance, Panzer is found murdered, with Red John's smiley face painted in blood on one of the walls near his body. Panzer's murder proves Jane's theory that Red John is still alive.

=== Ninth anniversary of Jane's wife and daughter's death ===
In the season 4's penultimate episode "Red Rover, Red Rover", Jane receives a message from Red John: an envelope with the words "Happy Anniversary" under the wiper of his car. In the cemetery where Jane's wife and daughter are buried, a little girl named Hailey (Emma Rayne Lyle) approaches him and says, "Hello, Patrick." When Patrick asks how she knows his name, she says, "Your friend told me," and reveals the red smiley-face painted on her hand. She says, "He told me to ask you a question ... 'Do you give up yet?'".

=== Jane's breakdown and Red John's proposal ===
In the fourth season's finale "The Crimson Hat", after being fired from the CBI, Jane finds himself in a Las Vegas bar, where he meets an attractive woman named Lorelei (Emmanuelle Chriqui) who reveals herself as an associate of Red John. She brings forward Red John's proposal for friendship and a "change" in Jane's lifestyle to help him overcome his depression. Jane is shocked and tells Lorelei to get out. However, he later confides to Lisbon that his breakdown had been tailored to get Red John to believe Patrick was really giving up. Red John communicates through Lorelei that he will only meet Jane in person if he kills Lisbon and brings him her head as a "present".

The CBI team executes a plot where they fake the murders of Lisbon and Rigsby at the hands of Jane, and the team goes into hiding. On hearing this over the news, Red John sends a message to Jane to meet him in Nevada. Darcy is investigating the apparent deaths of Lisbon and Rigsby. She discovers that the body found does not belong to Rigsby and gets arrest warrants issued against the entire team involved in the deception.

=== Lorelei Martins ===
In the fifth season episode "Red Sails in the Sunset", Lorelei Martins reappears in a women's prison, having been removed from CBI custody by the FBI. She remains loyal to Red John and when Jane, with the aid of Bret Stiles (Malcolm McDowell), has her broken out of prison, she expresses shock and disappointment that her liberator is Jane, not Red John. Jane discovers Lorelei had a sister who was murdered some years prior. Lisbon faxes him a photo of the crime scene where the word "ROY" can be seen scrawled on the floor next to the sister's body – information that had been withheld from the public at the time of the murder.

=== Visualize ===
In the fifth season episode "The Red Barn", it is hinted that Red John may currently be or was a member of the "Visualize Self-Realization Center" church, a notorious cult with a reputation for brainwashing its members, as two bodies which fit his MO were found on a farm previously controlled by Visualize, complete with his signature smiley face on the outside of the barn where the bodies were found.

The murders are revealed to have been committed over two decades ago, when various Visualize members worked on the farm until its eventual shutdown due to a lack of farming expertise, and ten years before Red John was an active serial killer who targeted predominantly women. This implies that Red John used the cult and its techniques to recruit individuals who would make suitable followers (as many of Visualize's members come from broken families and traumatic childhoods, a trait that nearly every single Red John operative also shares), then brainwashes or seduces them to effectively control them.

=== Bob Kirkland and Homeland Security ===
Robert "Bob" Kirkland, introduced in the retcon episode "Red Dawn", has engaged in numerous suspicious activities relating to Jane and Jane's search for Red John. In flashback just after Jane has joined the CBI, a man is seen thanking FBI Director Alexa Shultz for asking Virgil Minelli to keep the FBI updated on the Red John investigation. A couple of episodes later, the man reappears. He identifies himself as Homeland Security Agent Bob Kirkland, telling Lisbon that the Tommy Volker matter is being handled and that she should "take a step back".

=== The seven suspects ===
In the fifth season finale, Jane reveals to Lisbon that he has narrowed the Red John suspect list to seven names. Although those names aren't revealed until the end of the episode, Jane and the CBI investigate a Red John murder. Although it was initially believed that Red John wasn't involved in the murder and that it was either the victim's husband or uncle, it is revealed that Red John committed the murder with the help of Miriam Gottlieb, a social worker who wanted Eileen Turner's child. Gottlieb tricked Turner into separating herself from her volatile husband and moving into a motel, where Red John struck.

In transit after her arrest, Gottlieb commits suicide by swallowing a cyanide pill, refusing, like almost all Red John's operatives, to be taken alive. Before her arrest, she gave Jane a DVD from Red John, which featured the now-dead Lorelei Martins, who recorded a video shortly before her own murder by Red John. Martins reveals that Red John is very angry with her for revealing that Patrick and Red John had shaken hands, and that, in exchange for her making the recording, Red John will not "make her suffer so much". The video reveals that Red John somehow knows the names of Patrick Jane's seven suspects:

Suspect	First appearance	Description	Eliminated as Suspect (all in Season 6)
Brett Partridge (Jack Plotnick)	s1, ep. 1 "Pilot"	Bureau of Forensic Science Lead agent & member of the Blake Association	Eliminated 1st Killed by Red John in "The Desert Rose"
Robert "Bob" Kirkland (Kevin Corrigan)	s5, ep. 5 "Red Dawn"	Homeland Security agent	Eliminated 2nd Killed by Reede Smith in "Red Listed"
Thomas McAllister (Xander Berkeley)	s1, ep. 2 "Red Hair and Silver Tape"	Sheriff of Napa County / Red John - leader of the Blake Association	Eliminated 3rd Identified as Red John. Returns in "Red John" (where then killed by Patrick Jane)
Bret Stiles (Malcolm McDowell)	s2, ep. 20 "Red All Over"	Leader of Visualize Self-Realization Center	Eliminated 3rd Killed by Red John's bomb in "The Great Red Dragon"
Raymond Haffner (Reed Diamond)	s4, ep. 2 "Little Red Book"	Private detective, former CBI and FBI agent & member of Visualize	Eliminated 3rd Killed by Red John's bomb in "The Great Red Dragon"
Reede Smith (Drew Powell)	s5, ep. 1 "The Crimson Ticket"	FBI agent & member of the Blake Association	Eliminated 5th Surrenders to Kimball Cho in "The Great Red Dragon"
Gale Bertram (Michael Gaston)	s3, ep. 1 "Red Sky at Night"	CBI Director & member of the Blake Association	As the final suspect, is proclaimed in CBI press conference as being Red John; Eliminated 6th Killed by Association member Oscar Cordero in "Red John", with the not deceased McAllister/Red John stepping into view seconds later

Red John doesn't deny being one of these men. The killing of Eileen Turner marks the beginning of a new killing spree as Lorelei tells Jane that Red John will "start killing again ... often" until either Jane catches him, or he catches Jane. Out of frustration, Jane breaks the DVD with his own fingers, and sighs while looking out his window of his room at CBI.

=== The final hunt ===
The final hunt takes place over the first eight episodes of the sixth season. In the season premiere, Jane is highly disturbed at how Red John could deduce who he would have on his final list two months before finishing it, as well as have so much intimate knowledge of his memories and thought process. At a loss as to what to do, Jane remains extremely cautious around the seven suspects while Lisbon goes behind his back and has all the suspects' cell phones installed with GPS trackers.

=== The Blake Association ===
Knowing about the tattoo and using it as his leverage, Jane plans to gather the remaining five suspects (Robert Kirkland having been killed in the season's fifth episode) at his old house where he has ammunition. He plans to attract each suspect individually, telling them he has critical information about Red John. Jane promises Lisbon that she can accompany him during this process, but breaks his promise as he is worried about her safety.

=== The reveal and death of Red John ===
The next day, as the FBI cleans out the CBI headquarters, Jane receives a phone call from Bertram, who is still on the run with the aid of Oscar, but cuts their conversation short when a police officer at the gas station he is calling from recognizes Bertram. Before the officer can arrest him, Oscar shoots the officer dead and escapes with Bertram. Jane bides his time until Bertram calls him again, wishing to meet him to gain a sense of closure and believing that their rivalry has ended in an honorable tie. Jane gets Bertram to meet him in the chapel at the cemetery where his wife and daughter are buried.

At the chapel, Oscar lets Jane in where Bertram is waiting. Bertram clarifies he is not Red John but merely a foot soldier in the Blake Association and that Red John is a top brass and he has no idea who he is.

It appears that Red John is looking to tie up loose ends. Oscar, who has been in the room as well, has a gun. Bertram, under the assumption this means Oscar was to shoot Jane, appears confused when he is shot. Red John appears, thanking Oscar and telling him to leave the chapel. It is McAllister. After a short chat, Jane pulls out a handgun from under the pew and shoots him. A woman walks into the chapel calmly after supposedly hearing McAllister. The woman pulls out a knife to attack Jane, allowing McAllister to flee.

After being pursued through the cemetery, a neighborhood, and a playground, McAllister loses his stamina near a small pond and dials 911. Jane kicks his nemesis, knocking the phone away from him, and grasps the man's throat. As McAllister claims that he knew who would be on Jane's final list of suspects because he is a real psychic, Jane asks him two final questions to determine his honesty by looking at his eyes. Asking McAllister to blink once for no and two for yes, Jane asks if he is sorry for murdering his wife and daughter and if he is afraid to die; McAllister blinks twice to both questions. Satisfied with his answers, Jane then strangles McAllister to death.
