= Wayne Rigsby =

Fictional character

- The Mentalist character
- Owain Yeoman as Wayne Rigsby
- First appearance: "Pilot"
- Last appearance: "White Orchids"
- Created by: Bruno Heller
- Portrayed by: Owain Yeoman

In-universe information
- Nicknames: Rigs, Bert
- Gender: Male
- Title: Special Agent
- Occupation: Private Investigator Former Agent for the California Bureau of Investigation
- Family: Steven Robert Rigsby (father, deceased), Kimball Cho
- Spouse: Agent Grace Van Pelt
- Significant others: Sarah Harrigan (public defender; former lover/mother of Benjamin)
- Children: Benjamin Rigsby (Son with Sarah Harrigan); Maddy Rigsby (Daughter with Grace Van Pelt)
- Nationality: American

Wayne Rigsby is a fictional character on the CBS crime drama The Mentalist, portrayed by Owain Yeoman. Rigsby is a former agent for a fictionalized version of the California Bureau of Investigation, who left to become a private investigator who runs his own agency with his wife Grace Van Pelt Rigsby.

== Early life ==
Not much is known about Rigsby's childhood, aside from the fact that his father Steve (played by William Forsythe) was a motorcyclist and was in the Iron Gods motorcycle gang. His father was in and out of jail for numerous crimes, including manslaughter; it is strongly implied Rigsby was the victim of child abuse. Rigsby worked as an arson specialist in San Diego before becoming a CBI agent. Rigsby seems to be good friends with Cho and Jane.

== Personality ==
He is frequently trying to imitate Jane in his antics and way of life, such as trying to hypnotize a suspect and failing. He also seems to be more daring than Cho in some ways, such as when he runs into a burning house to save someone and in the process receives second degree burns on his arm. He has also shown moments of immaturity towards his coworkers, showing his sense of humour.

He finds it hard to resist snacking opportunistically. Even in a crime scene, he intended to steal a cupcake left in the kitchen.

== Personal relationships ==
=== With Grace Van Pelt ===
While his intense attraction to Grace Van Pelt is revealed in Season 1 Episode 2, it develops in season 2. During the first several episodes of the season, he repeatedly tries to work up the courage to tell her his true feelings but loses his courage, leading to Cho to deadpan "You're gonna die alone". She returns his feelings in "Red Scare", after Rigsby says he doesn't care about the CBI and that he just wants to be with her. Near the end of the episode, they share their first real kiss.

In "Black Gold and Red Blood", Van Pelt and Rigsby seem to be dating and greet each other happily at a crime scene. However, Rigsby tells Van Pelt he thinks Jane may know about their relationship. In the following episode, "Red Bulls", Van Pelt and Rigsby argue about his not wearing a bulletproof vest to canvass an apartment building. Van Pelt is shot multiple times in the chest while questioning a young woman, but survives with a bulletproof vest on. When Van Pelt is taken to an ambulance, Rigsby says he loves her. Van Pelt slaps Rigsby and tells him next time, he has to wear a bulletproof vest.

In the episode "Bleeding Heart", he and Van Pelt announce their relationship to the team. Lisbon says she will take action and report their relationship to the head of the CBI, but later changes her mind in "Redline" and tells Rigsby and Van Pelt not to have physical contact with each other while at the office.

In the episode "The Red Box", Madeleine Hightower, the new head of the CBI, mysteriously discovers Rigsby's relationship with Van Pelt and informs Lisbon, who feigns ignorance.

In "Aingavite Baa", Hightower gives Van Pelt and Rigsby an ultimatum: they can be in a relationship only if one of them leaves the unit. As they walk out of Hightower's office, Rigsby and Van Pelt say they love each other. Rigsby, after being in a shootout, tells Van Pelt he will get another job so they can be together. However, at the end of the episode, Grace breaks things off by saying she doesn't want the responsibility of making Rigsby leave the CBI. Rigsby pleads with her to talk it through, but Van Pelt simply says she knows herself and walks away, leaving him heartbroken. Van Pelt is later seen crying while walking into the office elevator.

In the episode "Bloodhounds," Rigsby dates criminal profiler Dr. Montague and shows interest in seeing her again. However, using her knowledge of behavioral patterns, Dr. Montague gently turns Rigsby down, stating he is clearly in love with someone else (which Rigsby does not deny).

During the third season, Van Pelt begins dating FBI Agent Craig O'Laughlin. In the episode "Blood for Blood," Van Pelt accepts O'Laughlin's marriage proposal, much to Rigsby's dismay. However, it is revealed in the third season finale that Craig is actually a mole for Red John.

In season 4, Rigsby starts dating a public defender. Van Pelt is jealous when she finds out, hinting that she wants Rigsby back.

In the season 5 episode "Red Velvet Cupcakes", Rigsby and Van Pelt go undercover as a couple with relationship problems. They then start showing their true feelings towards each other; after the case was solved, Van Pelt goes over to Rigsby's home and starts kissing him, which implies that they revived their relationship. In the season 5 finale, Rigsby confirms with Cho that he and Van Pelt are back together. In the sixth season episode "Wedding in Red," Rigsby proposes to Van Pelt, who accepts; they are wed in the same episode.

In the season 6 episode "My Blue Heaven," which jumps forward two years, Rigsby and Van Pelt are still married, running a digital surveillance firm, and have a young child.

=== With Sarah Harrigan ===
Rigsby begins dating Sarah Harrigan, a public defender, in season 4. In "My Bloody Valentine", she informs Rigsby she is pregnant. In the episode "War of the Roses", he and Sarah start preparing for their impending parenthood. They attend their first Lae childbirth class. Rigsby gets a little queasy and awkward after watching videos of birth. He later proposes to Sarah in one of the CBI conference rooms, but she says she does not want him to propose to her just because she is pregnant. She also says Rigsby will be a great father, but they are not ready for marriage yet. In "Something's Rotten in Redmund," Sarah gives birth (off-camera) to their son, Benjamin. In season 5 ("Blood Feud"), Rigsby reveals he and Sarah have split.
