= Miranda Cowley Heller =

American author and TV developer (born 1962)

- Born: 1962 (age 63–64)
- Education: Harvard University
- Notable work: "The Paper Palace" (2021)
- Spouse: Bruno Heller

Miranda Phillips Cowley Heller (born in 1962) is an American writer, novelist, and TV developer. She is known for her debut novel, The Paper Palace, published in 2021.

== Personal life ==
Cowley Heller grew up in New York in a literary and artistic family. Her grandfather, Malcolm Cowley, was a renowned poet and critic, her aunt Hayden Herrera is an art historian and biographer, and her sister-in-law Zoë Heller is also a writer. She is a graduate of Harvard University. Cowley Heller was accepted into a PhD program in art history at UCLA but turned it down to move with her husband, Bruno Heller, a British TV screenwriter, for his job. She currently splits time living in London, Los Angeles, and Cape Cod.

== Career ==
Cowley Heller has had a prolific career across books, magazines, and TV. She began her career at Cosmopolitan magazine where she worked as a fiction and books editor. She spent a decade as head of drama series at HBO in the early 2000s. While at HBO, she worked on hit shows such as The Sopranos, The Wire, Six Feet Under, Big Love, and Deadwood. She worked both as a ghostwriter and a screenwriting editor. In 2021, she published her debut novel, The Paper Palace.

=== TV ===
In 1997, Cowley Heller moved to LA to begin her job at HBO. She spent nearly a decade working there as senior vice president and head of drama series. She began at HBO before a drama series department existed, and led with a "writer-led" approach to TV development.

=== The Paper Palace ===
In 2021, Cowley published her debut novel, The Paper Palace. It was a #1 New York Times' Bestseller, a Reese Witherspoon's Book Club pick, and longlisted for the 2022 Women's Prize for Fiction. Thirty international editions of the book have been published.

The book rights were purchased by HBO, which plans to develop it into a mini-series with Cowley Heller developing the screenplay.

== Published works ==
- (2021) The Paper Palace. New York: Riverhead Books. ISBN 978-0-593-32982-5
- (2025) What the Deep Water Knows: Penguin ISBN 978-1405975261
