= The Mentalist season 3 =

The Mentalist
- Season 3
- DVD cover
- No. of episodes: 24

Release
- Original network: CBS
- Original release: September 23, 2010 – May 19, 2011

Season chronology
- ← Previous; Season 2 Next → Season 4

The third season of The Mentalist premiered on September 23, 2010 and concluded with its 2-hour season finale on May 19, 2011. The season consisted of 24 episodes. Jane's pursuit of Red John intensifies when evidence emerges that a high-ranking insider within law enforcement is working for the serial killer. Balancing regular CBI homicide cases, Jane orchestrates a high-stakes sting operation to unmask the mole and confront Red John face-to-face.

== Cast and characters ==
=== Main cast ===
- Simon Baker as Patrick Jane (24 episodes)
- Robin Tunney as Teresa Lisbon (24 episodes)
- Tim Kang as Kimball Cho (24 episodes)
- Owain Yeoman as Wayne Rigsby (24 episodes)
- Amanda Righetti as Grace Van Pelt (24 episodes)

=== Recurring cast ===
- Aunjanue Ellis as Madeleine Hightower (10 episodes)
- Pruitt Taylor Vince as J.J. LaRoche (8 episodes)
- Eric Winter as Craig O'Laughlin (7 episodes)
- Michael Gaston as Gale Bertram (6 episodes)
- Rebecca Wisocky as Brenda Shettrick (5 episodes)

=== Notable guest cast ===
- Malcolm McDowell as Bret Stiles ("The Blood On His Hands")
- Leslie Hope as Kristina Frye ("The Blood On His Hands")
- Jack Coleman as Max Winter ("Red Carpet Treatment")
- Currie Graham as Walter Mashburn ("Red Hot")
- Željko Ivanek as Linus Wagner ("Ball of Fire")
- John Billingsley as Ellis Mars ("Red Moon")
- Connor Trinneer as Deputy Bob Woolgar ("Red Moon")
- Gregory Itzin as Virgil Minelli ("Jolly Red Elf")
- Linda Park as Dr Montague ("Bloodhounds")
- Ethan Phillips as Newsome Kirk ("The Red Mile")
- Morena Baccarin as Erica Flynn ("Every Rose Has Its Thorn")
- David Norona as Osvaldo Ardiles ("Rhapsody in Red")
- Bradley Whitford as Timothy Carter/Fake Red John ("Strawberries and Cream - Part 2")
- Bryan Lugo as Rusty Moores ("Red Moon")
- Casey Sander as Sheriff Hughes ("Red Gold")
- Kaitlyn Dever as Trina DeGeorge ("Blood for Blood")
- William Forsythe as Rigsby's father

== Episodes ==
| No. overall | No. in season | Title | Directed by | Written by | Original release date | Prod. code | U.S. viewers (millions) |
|---|---|---|---|---|---|---|---|
| 47 | 1 | "Red Sky at Night" | Chris Long | Bruno Heller | September 23, 2010 | 3X6401 | 15.50 |
After his encounter with Red John and Kristina Frye's probable death, Patrick Jane rethinks his future with the CBI. At the same time, the team investigates the high-profile kidnapping of missing lobbyist Harvey Dublin and the murder of his chauffeur, Pete Russo. Patrick tries to excuse himself from working the case forcing Lisbon to work on convincing him.
| 48 | 2 | "Cackle-Bladder Blood" | John Polson | Ashley Gable | September 30, 2010 | 3X6402 | 14.65 |
When Patrick's brother-in-law, Daniel "Danny" Ruskin, returns to town and gets mixed up in a murder investigation (with Danny seeming to be the murderer of a businessman he was conning), Patrick must come to his aid despite personal reservations.
| 49 | 3 | "The Blood on His Hands" | David M. Barrett | Tom Szentgyörgyi | October 7, 2010 | 3X6403 | 14.39 |
A young woman associated with Visualize is found dead and the CBI works to discover if someone from Visualize is the murderer leading them to join forces with FBI Agent Craig O'Laughlin who reveals the FBI's investigation of the role of Visualize in tax evasion and racketeering. Cult leader and founder of Visualize, Bret Stiles offers Patrick information on Red John and the disappearance of Kristina Frye to defuse their rivalry and try to ease their relationship. The information is found to be accurate and Kristina is found alive, but catatonic. She has been made to believe that she is actually dead and cannot recall any details about her abduction or Red John.
| 50 | 4 | "Red Carpet Treatment" | Charles Beeson | Daniel Cerone | October 14, 2010 | 3X6404 | 15.13 |
Jane and the rest of the team investigate the murder of a convict, Henry Dahl, who was released recently based on DNA evidence. Dahl, who had been convicted of the rape and murder of Jennifer Winter, was also having an affair with a woman who he had become pen pals with while in prison. Jennifer's husband, Max Winter, finally admits to having shot Dahl nine times in the face but says that Dahl was already dead when he shot him. Meanwhile, Dahl's pen pal's husband admits to having hit Dahl on the head. Both men are able to avoid definitive murder charges with no way of knowing who actually murdered Dahl. Max Winter thanks Jane and gifts him a gun.
| 51 | 5 | "The Red Ponies" | John F. Showalter | Eoghan Mahony | October 21, 2010 | 3X6405 | 14.42 |
The CBI team is called upon to look into the murder of Bill Sutton, a well-known, talented jockey, and their investigation leads the CBI to a horse racing track owned by the fiercely independent Rob Caulwell.
| 52 | 6 | "Pink Chanel Suit" | Eric Laneuville | Ken Woodruff | October 28, 2010 | 3X6406 | 14.76 |
The CBI team is at a loss when the daughter of a federal judge goes missing and her boyfriend in found dead on the extremely well-guarded family compound a day before her grandmother's funeral. It seems impossible that the troubled girl and drug addict Abby left the family estate and her finger prints are found on the weapon used to kill her boyfriend. Jane predicts that the Abby's body is hidden in the grandmother's coffin but is proved wrong. However, the real killer, the family doctor tries to hide Abby's body in the coffin and is caught red-handed. He is revealed to have been supplying Abby with drugs who overdosed and died. He killed the boyfriend to conceal his truth.
| 53 | 7 | "Red Hot" | Chris Long | Ashley Gable | November 4, 2010 | 3X6407 | 14.42 |
Jane and the CBI team narrowly escape a fiery end when a building explodes while they are investigating a death threat sent to businessman Bajoran. Called up by billionaire Walter Mashburn (Currie Graham), the CBI must consider him a suspect given his need for thrill and his past connection to Bajoran's wife and Mashburn and Bajoran's longstanding enmity. Meanwhile, sparks fly between Lisbon and Mashburn who makes no pretense of his interest in her.
| 54 | 8 | "Ball of Fire" | Stephen Gyllenhaal | Tom Szentgyörgyi | November 11, 2010 | 3X6408 | 13.84 |
At a fruit stall in Clarksburg, a hooded man abducts Jane. A second woman kills the abductor, and Jane is handcuffed to a pole in a cabin basement. Jane recognizes her as Rachael Bowman, the daughter of an insurance salesman Jane helped put away. Linus Wagner, a doctor Jane put away two years ago, offers to help rescue Jane in order to commute his likely imminent death sentence. Wagner has received letters from a woman obsessed with Jane. Rigsby and O'Laughlin ID Rachel's accomplice, from blood on the getaway car, as Fred Kittel. Cho matches text from Wagner's letters to Don Bowman and his daughter Rachel. Lisbon leaves to check Rachel's file but Rachel captures her en route. Rigsby and O'Laughlin track down Kittel's father who directs them to the family cabin. Rachel cuffs Lisbon to the same pipe as Jane wanting to burn down the cabin. Jane and Lisbon almost subdue Rachel using a ruse. Rachel is about to shoot them when Hightower enters and shoots her dead instead.
| 55 | 9 | "Red Moon" | Simon Baker | Bruno Heller | November 18, 2010 | 3X6409 | 14.74 |
Ellis Mars, a local astrologer, helps Patrick solve a triple murder involving two policemen and an EMT's fiancée. The case expands to several previous policemen murders, and forces the killer to break his normal full moon killing cycle to keep from being exposed. While the local police believe it was Mars who was the killer, Patrick realises it was the seemingly-livid and distraught EMT himself, Todd Johnson. After his arrest, Patrick arrives at Johnson's cell at his request, only to find Johnson in flames. Johnson later dies from his injuries, but not before whispering the first verse of The Tyger, revealing Red John was involved in Johnson's activities and death.
| 56 | 10 | "Jolly Red Elf" | John F. Showalter | Daniel Cerone | December 9, 2010 | 3X6410 | 13.41 |
After the death of a Santa, the CBI follows leads that take them to an AA group and the National Society of Authentic Santas. Meanwhile, when Todd Johnson, a person in custody, dies, the Professional Services Unit (PSU) investigator, J. J. LaRoche (Pruitt Taylor Vince), questions Patrick about the death of Johnson, he is a major suspect as he was the last person to see him alive. Patrick, avoiding LaRoche, reaches out to retired CBI Supervising Minelli (Gregory Itzin), who agrees to provide information to Patrick when he reveals Johnson was a member of Red John's network, a fact Red John himself does not know, which finally gives Patrick the advantage.
| 57 | 11 | "Bloodsport" | Roxann Dawson | Eoghan Mahony | January 6, 2011 | 3X6411 | 14.88 |
While LaRoche continues his Todd Johnson murder investigation, this time having some uncomfortable questions for Rigsby, the CBI turns its attention to the murder of a journalist who is killed below the stands during a professional martial arts fight, and her death is somehow linked to the fight. Meanwhile, Professional Standards Unit Investigator LaRoche focuses his investigation on Rigsby, who in turn is forced to ask Cho for a huge favor in order to keep his job.
| 58 | 12 | "Bloodhounds" | Charles Beeson | Erika Green Swafford | January 20, 2011 | 3X6412 | 14.82 |
Patrick Jane and the CBI are joined by scientific criminal profiler Dr. Montague (Linda Park) to investigate a double murder, which appears to be the work of a serial killer named Caveman. For Jane, it becomes a competition to prove that his methods are superior, and Dr. Montague learns that statistics are not everything, while they discover that the two murder victims did have a connection - they rode the same bus. However, after going on a date with Rigsby, she informs him they have a small chance for a successful relationship because it is clear that he is still in love with someone else. Dr. Montague and Jane strike a friendship and, as a gift, she gives him a profile she put together for Red John.
| 59 | 13 | "Red Alert" | Guy Ferland | Jordan Harper | February 3, 2011 | 3X6413 | 15.18 |
Amber, a documentary filmmaker is found dead in her home. Some of Amber's stolen equipment is found in the home of Ron Crosswhite, who is thought to have killed his wife years previously but got off due to a paperwork error by Officer Rowley. Before he can be arrested, a desperate Crosswhite takes hostages at City Hall. Lisbon tries to resolve the hostage situation while also dealing both with interference from the Mayor and a sniper attempt on Crosswhite by a guilt-ridden Rowley. Lisbon also has to contend with Police Chief Arnold Nail who wants to go in with all guns blazing. Meanwhile, Jane tries to solve Crosswhite's wife's murder and persuades Crosswhite to surrender, setting a trap for the real murderer by announcing that Amber left a letter in the Mayor's office. Crosswhite surrenders and Nail reports there was no letter revealing he is the real murderer. Nail doctored evidence to implicate Ron Crosswhite, but Rowley's paperwork error meant that Crosswhite's case was dismissed. Amber realized the discrepancy in the evidence, so Nail killed her too.
| 60 | 14 | "Blood for Blood" | Martha Mitchell | David Appelbaum | February 10, 2011 | 3X6414 | 14.86 |
While protecting Justin DeGeorge, the key witness against drug baron Adrian Essex, Van Pelt is knocked out and the witness murdered. His daughter, Trina, probably has crucial memories but her aunt, Jody, refuses to let Patrick question her. The team nabs Essex's accomplice, Eugene Boden. LaRoche is investigating Van Pelt's role is letting the witness die and offers her a positive result if she agrees to spy for him on her team for the Todd Johnson investigation. Announcing that Trina has remembered, Jane and the CBI lure US Marshal Gorman as being the one who was paid to carry out the hit on the witness. Van Pelt shoots Gorman dead when he attacks her and Lisbon. Van Pelt is cleared and she turns down LaRoche's offer to spy on her team. Agent O'Laughlin proposes to her and she accepts. Trina remembers that she was the one who shot her father in self defense after confronting him about her mother's death.
| 61 | 15 | "Red Gold" | Tom Verica | Cindi M. Grossenbacher | February 17, 2011 | 3X6415 | 15.01 |
When Lisbon is injured during the investigation into a modern-day prospector's murder, Agent Hightower works with Patrick Jane in the field for the first time.
| 62 | 16 | "Red Queen" | Chris Long | Daniel Cerone | February 24, 2011 | 3X6416 | 14.79 |
The CBI team investigates the fatal stabbing of Manuel Montero, a university professor of ancient art. Meanwhile, Hightower admits to La Roche that she had a sexual relationship with Rance Howard, one of Todd Johnson's victims. Rigsby and Cho visit Montero's warehouse and find he was illegally trading guns. Lisbon finds a link between Montero and Johnson - a gun from Montero's cache was the one Johnson used to kill his victims. Jane realises that Hightower might be identified from the fingerprints found at Montero's crime scene. He pries Hightower away from the briefing and tells her about the Johnson's connection to Red John. Having established Hightower's innocence, Jane lets her use him as a hostage to escape from the CBI headquarters. Hightower urges Patrick to share their plan with Lisbon, but he refuses.
| 63 | 17 | "Bloodstream" | Bobby Roth | Erika Green Swafford | March 10, 2011 | 3X6417 | 14.28 |
Dr Micah Newton, a hospital administrator, is found murdered at a golf driving range. Newton's radiation badge shows above the safe radiation limit but Newton's body does not. LaRoche, who has been given Hightower's position, appoints Cho as the new boss in the team. Cho and Rigsby interview Newton's husband, who hands over a letter from Byron Jordan threatening Newton's life if his wife Enid does not get her promised kidney transplant. Lisbon learns Newton's badge was swiped in Radiology, and was used thrice as much in the past month. The CBI discovers that his assistant Francine Trent used the badge to steal valuable nuclear material and sell it on the black market, but she has an alibi for the time of his murder. Impressed with the assistant's arrest, LaRoche reinstates Lisbon as the boss. Observing several patients at the hospital in pain despite being on medication, Jane plots to reveal the killer using medication to reverse the effects of whoever is on drugs. Dr. Gidry, the anesthesiologist, sneaks off to shoot drugs and confesses that Newton found out she was stealing drugs from patients and so she had to kill him.
| 64 | 18 | "The Red Mile" | Darnell Martin | Tom Szentgyörgyi | March 31, 2011 | 3X6418 | 14.27 |
The body of Timothy Hartley is stolen while en route to the morgue. Jane invites coroner Dr. Steiner to join the CBI on solving the case having realized he is terminally ill and is looking for a distraction. The team are joined by FBI Agent O'Laughlin, to explore the angle of body thefts by tissue banks. Jane and Dr. Steiner bait the killer by having Dr. Steiner make a call and faking having found blood evidence on Hartley's body before it went missing. The Cooks' butler brings the money revealing the killer to be Hartley's mother-in-law who killed him because he wanted to start an international group for alien abductees using the Cook family name. Dr. Steiner invites Patrick and requests him to witness his death so there is no investigation. Patrick and Dr. Steiner spend Steiner's last moments over a cup of tea while Patrick shares his "carni" tricks with Steiner as he passes away peacefully.
| 65 | 19 | "Every Rose Has Its Thorn" | Charles Beeson | Ken Woodruff | April 7, 2011 | 3X6419 | 15.17 |
John Flynn, CEO of a high-end matchmaking company Symphony, is found murdered in San Francisco. Jane is convinced that John's widow, Erica Flynn, is the murderer, despite her having an alibi. John's ex-wife, Kim Cartwright, tells Van Pelt that John was unhappy with Erica. Rigsby and Cho track down a client, Cliff, who leads them to Naomi, a woman he met at a Symphony mixer who later blackmailed him with a sex tape. Patrick pursues an independent investigation to prove Erica is the murderer going so far as to visit the Symphony office by himself and do an interview with Erica. He concludes that she had an accomplice, her easily manipulated receptionist, Peter. Patrick tricks Erica into admitting that she didn't really care for Peter and has him overhear her. Peter confesses to having provided a fake alibi for Erica who assures Patrick that she won't be convicted once her case comes to trial before a jury.
| 66 | 20 | "Redacted" | David M. Barrett | Eoghan Mahony | April 28, 2011 | 3X6420 | 13.53 |
As police arrest a burglar whom LaRoche catches searching his home, Jane's car speeds off unnoticed from the scene. Jane visits the CBI detention cell where the burglar, Donny Culpepper, threatens to reveal it was Jane who hired him unless Jane gets him off before his court hearing on Monday. Meanwhile, at an electronics repair shop, the owner Ted Fisher is found murdered and the shop trashed. Lisbon and Rigsby meet Fisher's girlfriend, Heather Blue, at their apartment which has also been broken into. While Fisher told Heather he was in the Peace Corps there is no record of him and an Iraqi man has left a threatening message on his phone. Cho and Rigsby find Cole Ruger and Vivian Griswold pointing guns at each other at Fisher's shop. Ruger reveals he and Fisher were mercenaries and worked overseas including Iraq. Griswold is with corporate espionage and had been tracking Fisher. CBI track down the Iraqi message from Omar Hassan who tells them that Fisher had his family's money (2 million dollars) and was supposed to help him and his family settle down in the US. Jane has the CBI team bring Ruger, Griswold, Omar Hassan, and Heather to Fisher's shop, saying all of them want the $2 million Fisher hid there. Jane has Forensics empty the shop of everything but some furniture and the large floor rug. Everyone leaves, disappointed the money has not been found, except for Heather. When Jane reveals the money is in the form of the valuable rug, she gets him to agree to split the profit 50:50. Jane reveals that when Fisher refused the same deal, intending to honour his promise to Hassan, she killed him. Lisbon forces Jane to come clean and he tells her about Hightower being framed by Red John, and that he hired Culpepper to steal LaRoche's list of suspects from his Todd Johnson murder investigation. One of them (besides Hightower) is Red John's mole in the CBI or it is LaRoche himself. Lisbon fixes the Culpepper problem by punching Culpepper in the presence of his lawyer. This interferes with legal process and automatically causes instant dismissal of the charges. LaRoche punishes Lisbon with one week's suspension plus anger management classes.
| 67 | 21 | "Like a Redheaded Stepchild" | Eric Laneuville | Jordan Harper | May 5, 2011 | 3X6421 | 14.00 |
In Hangtree, California, corrections officer Walton Parsell is found dead, stabbed in the back multiple times, near a jewelry store, killed with a prison shank leading the team to suspect an ex-convict. At CBI, Van Pelt hands out wedding invitations. Lisbon and Jane question Parsell's girlfriend of two weeks, Shelley. Rigsby speaks with ex-cons including his father, Steve, who despises his cop son. Steve still sells stolen cigarettes and meth but denies involvement in the murder. Corrections Officer Earls tells Jane and Lisbon that Parsell had been studying criminology at a local college, working with a professor on transferring an inmate to a supermax prison. Jane determines it to be white supremacist Marcus Lansdale and deduces from facial similarities that Shelley is Lansdale's sister. Shelley admits she met Parsell to spy on him for her brother but later stopped as she genuinely fell in love with Parsell. Rigsby and Van Pelt visit Steve for help who leads them to a woman named Rocket. Rocket implicates meth cook and dealer Butch Carwin but later Rigsby realises his father set them up to get rid of his (Steve's) competition. Rigsby burns Steve's stolen cigarettes and the pair call a truce after a fist fight. After watching prison surveillance cameras, Jane has two trusties brought to CBI for interviews: Jorge Valasquez and Nick Monaco, both near the end of their sentences and tries to get them to snitch. In the prison refectory Jane has Earls bust a drug dealer and his stash angering Lansdale. Jane ensures Valasquez overhears him telling Lisbon that Monaco is the snitch. Valasquez tells Lansdale who readies to kill Monaco but is apprehended and sent to max security prison. Jane and Lisbon intercept the laundry truck and find Monaco. He confesses that he had been sneaking out to rob jewelry stores to build a nest egg for when he got out but got caught by Parsell so he had to kill him. Jane reveals he figured it out having seen Monaco's freshly manicured nails. Rigsby tells Van Pelt he is still in love with her and won't attend her wedding.
| 68 | 22 | "Rhapsody in Red" | David M. Barrett | David Appelbaum | May 12, 2011 | 3X6422 | 14.07 |
The Northern California Symphony Orchestra comes under investigation when one of its first chair violinists, Eleanor Artega, is found shot to death at a bus stop. A single petal of a hydrangea flower is found at the crime scene. Investigations reveal that Eleanor was from a tough neighbourhood and had recently had a falling out with her controlling mother. Her mother had been Eleanor's manager and had forced Eleanor to get a restraining order against her gang member boyfriend. In the Orchestra, Eleanor's place is taken by the second chair violinist. Jane plants a rumour that the maestro was having an affair with Eleanor to reveal the real killer. Meanwhile, Cho has his hands full when he has to deal with Anthony Rome, a bright and talented young pickpocket.
| 69 | 23 | "Strawberries and Cream (Part I)" | Chris Long | Ashley Gable | May 19, 2011 | 3X6423 | 14.11 |
At JD Gas & Food Mart, a nervous man wearing a suicide vest is caught between store employee Gupta and two suspicious policeman. The bomb vest explodes. Jane determines the dead perpetrator, Alan Dinkler, was actually the victim, who earlier had held up Cash In Motion, a payday loan store where he worked. He stole cash and client lists but, Jane determines, the cash is a decoy and someone was after the client lists. Gupta tells Lisbon and Jane that Dinkler asked for the restroom key and they find "AD - 297A6 Windsor" written on the wall as instructions for Dinkler. CBI identify a slew of matching addresses. Jane goes to check on Lisbon who is driving to the last "Windsor" on her list, a closed-down school. He finds Lisbon unconscious and, like Dinkler, with a bomb strapped to her chest. A cell phone attached to the vest rings and a muffled voice threatens to detonate the bomb if she does not fetch the Cash In Motion client lists from the CBI evidence. When the bomber asks how far away they are from the CBI, Jane realizes he cannot see them and turns off the route. Jane narrates their pretend progress to the CBI storage locker while they hunt the bomber. They successfully burst in on Gupta and disarm the bomb. In a police van, LaRoche shoots Gupta dead saying he was trying to escape. Lisbon briefs her superiors LaRoche and Bertram: Jane knew it was Gupta as soon as he knew the bomber could speak directly to Dinkler (by phone) as he did with Lisbon so the restroom message was only a ploy to entrap the CBI. Dinkler stopped to deliver the stolen client list to Gupta but the policemen's intervention forced Gupta to detonate the bomb. One client on Cash in Motion's list is Max James who, when checked on, is found dead in his house after being tortured. Cho finds a photo of James with Hightower. Jane and Lisbon realise they are being manipulated by Red John who is hunting Hightower. Lisbon orders Cho to forget what he found and asks him to trust her. Later Jane goes to a hotel room and finds Hightower waiting for him.
| 70 | 24 | "Strawberries and Cream (Part II)" | Chris Long | Bruno Heller | May 19, 2011 | 3X6424 | 14.11 |
Hightower tells Jane Max James was her cousin who had been sending her money. She tells him she has decided to turn herself in and try and prove her innocence in court so her children can at least stay safe. She agrees to Jane's request to wait 48 hours so he can find Red John's CBI mole. Jane and Lisbon brief Cho, Rigsby and Van Pelt about Red John and Hightower, and they agree to help. Jane forces LaRoche to give him the list of suspects by bluffing that he knows LaRoche's darkest secret. The suspects are Brenda Shettrick (CBI Media Relations), Osvaldo Ardiles (D.A.), Bertram (CBI director), and Craig O'Laughlin (FBI, Van Pelt's fiancé). Lisbon orders an indignant Van Pelt to go and guard Hightower in her mountain hideout. Jane knows Red John would send only an anonymous assassin. So the suspects are told Hightower is at the Pacific Palms Hotel but each suspect is told a different room number. A woman enters room 605, the number they told Bertram. They watch her unpack handcuffs, rope and knockout drugs but as Cho and Rigsby hold her at gun point she jumps to her death. Van Pelt returns to the CBI office and tells O'Laughlin they found Todd Johnson's real killer. She asks him to join her in relieving Lisbon who is currently guarding Hightower. Jane uses Bertram as bait, taking him to a cafe in Pinewood Shopping Mall, ostensibly to meet Hightower. When Hightower does not show, Bertram mocks Jane that he is at the end of his rope. Suddenly Jane realizes the assassin had rope to climb down to room 505 below making O'Laughlin the accomplice. O'Laughlin murders the two police guards outside Hightower's hideout. Jane rings Lisbon and warns her. As she turns to look at O'Laughlin, he shoots and injures her. Apologizing to Van Pelt, as he is about to shoot her and Hightower, Lisbon distracts him enough for them both to draw their guns and kill him. Jane asks Lisbon to press redial on O'Laughlin's phone and tell whoever answers that O'Laughlin is dead. A man sitting close to Jane answers his phone and Jane hears his reply, identical to the words Lisbon reports hearing. Jane sits at the man's table, and sees there is a gun on the table pointed at him disguised under a newspaper. Red John says he does not want to kill Jane unless he has to. He is going to quit killing, get a new face and a new life. Jane says he will find him and kill him. As the man leaves, Jane asks how can he know that he really is Red John. The man says Jane's wife smelled like lavender while his daughter smelled like strawberries and cream. Jane’s eyes well up with tears, and shoots him dead. Jane removes the gun that had been hidden in his coat pocket, sits down and waits for the police to arrest him.

== International reception ==
In the UK, the season premiered on Friday 15 October at 9 pm on Channel Five to 2.18 million viewers, nearly 1 million less than the second season's premiere. Overall, the season averaged 2.08 million viewers (21% less than the previous season), making this the least watched season of the series so far. The most watched episode was Jolly Red Elf (2.62 million), and the least watched episode was Pink Chanel Suit (1.74 million). The season ended on Friday 10 June.

== DVD release ==
All 24 episodes were released on the five disc complete third season set. It was released on September 20, 2011 in Region 1, October 10, 2011 in Region 2, and October 26, 2011 in Region 4. It included the featurettes "The Mentalist: Portrait of a Serial Killer- Red John" and "'Red Moon' Directed by Simon Baker" as well as unaired scenes.
