= Pax (1994 film) =

- Directed by: Eduardo Guedes
- Screenplay by: Bruno Heller
- Produced by: Joaquim Pinto
- Starring: Amanda Plummer; Isabel Ruth; Marcia Breia; João Lagarto; Paulo Guilherme
- Edited by: Claúdio Martins
- Music by: Carlos Martins
- Production company: Tóbis Portuguesa
- Distributed by: Atalanta Filmes
- Release date: 16 September 1994 (Lisbon)
- Running time: 73 min
- Country: Portugal
- Languages: Portuguese; English

Pax is a Portuguese comedy film directed by Eduardo Guedes with a screenplay by Bruno Heller. It is part of a film trilogy about Lisbon, ordered for Lisbon's year as European Cultural Capital in 1994.

== Synopsis ==
Franny (Amanda Plummer), an absent-minded American girl, is in Lisbon to deliver an important package. Unfortunately she has lost the address and only knows that the recipient's name is João. When she meets an old hooker, Esmeralda, the two join forces and begin cruising the town at night, across the streets and the local bars, meeting Lisbon's unconventional night fauna, to try to find João (which would never happen). Franny and Esmeralda open the package to find the contents and final destination of the package.
