= Eduardo Guedes =

Portuguese filmmaker

Eduardo Luis Santos Correia Guedes (21 April 1941 – 29 August 2000) was a Portuguese film-maker involved with the independent British film collective Cinema Action.

Guedes was born in Lisbon, the son of a judge, and initially studied chemical engineering at the University of Lisbon, but after refusing to take part in the Portuguese colonial wars, he left in 1961 to study film-making at the London International Film School. After graduating in 1964, he worked as a tutor at the school.

In 1965 he went to Brazil and made three documentaries (one, Rio Araguaia, was later networked by the BBC and French television). Returning to London, he freelanced as a film editor from 1968 to 1971, working with theatre director Peter Brook and Thames Television's Jeremy Isaacs, and was credited as editor of Maurice Hatton's 1970 film Praise Marx and Pass the Ammunition.

In 1971, Guedes joined Cinema Action. This was a key component in the organisation of the Independent Film-makers Association which campaigned, among other things, for airtime for independents on the UK Channel 4 network. In 1981, Guedes shot and edited a documentary, So That You Can Live, which opened Channel 4's independent film slot.

Cinema Action's first feature, Rocinante (1986) starred John Hurt and Ian Dury, was written and directed by Eduardo and his wife Ann Guedes, and produced by Gustav Lamche. A second feature, Bearskin: An Urban Fairytale (1990) starred Dury and Tom Waits.

While fighting the cancer that would eventually cause his death, Guedes made two more features in Portugal: Pax (1994), starring Amanda Plummer and Isabel Ruth, and Knives And Angels (2000).
