= Ken Woodruff =

American television writer and producer

Kenny Woodruff is an American television writer and producer. He is the showrunner and co-creator of Prime Video's Butterfly as well as the creator and showrunner of NBC's The Enemy Within. He has written and produced for CBS's The Mentalist for six seasons, and was a producer and writer for Fox's Gotham, also created by Mentalist creator Bruno Heller. Woodruff was also an executive producer of NBC's La Brea and penned two episodes of CBS' Shark.

Woodruff also has experience being a producer's assistant on Fox's The O.C. from the year 2003.
