= Kimball Cho =

- The Mentalist character
- Tim Kang as Kimball Cho
- First appearance: "Pilot"
- Last appearance: "White Orchids"
- Created by: Bruno Heller
- Portrayed by: Tim Kang

In-universe information
- Nickname: Ernie; Ice Man; Cho Friday
- Gender: Male
- Title: Special Agent (FBI); Senior Agent (CBI)
- Occupation: FBI Special Agent; Former Senior Agent and (briefly) Senior Agent in charge for the California Bureau of Investigation; Former U.S. Army
- Significant other: Elise Chaye (ex-girlfriend); Summer Edgecombe (ex-girlfriend)
- Nationality: Korean-American

Kimball Cho is a fictional character portrayed by Tim Kang on the American TV crime drama The Mentalist. Cho is a former senior agent for the California Bureau of Investigation (CBI) and is currently an FBI special agent. Cho serves as the polar opposite to Patrick Jane, but is keen to learn his powers of observation. He is portrayed as straightforward and direct, but sometimes makes witty jokes with much of the humor lying in his ability to deadpan. According to The Mentalist Code, he received his name from Dr. Richard Kimble, just as Red John received his name from Fred Johnson, the one-armed man on The Fugitive.

== Background ==
A native of Oakland, California, Cho had a colorful adolescence, having been an aspiring baseball player and then a member of the local ethnic gang "Avon Park Playboys". As a member of the Playboys, he was known as "Iceman", because according to gang member Jon Jon, "if you wanted something done cold, you got Cho"—a reference to his cool and collected character. Jane remarks that this has not changed. At age 14, he stole a car and promptly crashed it a yard down the street. The turning point came when he shot the gang leader KS in the shoulder because he was planning for the Playboys to conduct a home invasion in which Cho did not wish to take part. Within weeks of getting out of the gang, Cho enlisted in the U.S. Army, eventually serving in the Special Forces (1st Special Forces Group).

Cho's parents were immigrants from Korea and the character, like actor Tim Kang, is able to speak some Korean.

== On the job ==
Cho is well regarded by the CBI team, showing concern and the desire to help when Jane is going through difficulties. At most times, Cho seems to be the calmest and most clearheaded of the agents, but is shown to have a loose temper if someone he cares for is threatened. He is usually the agent that makes the arrest, reads suspects their rights and acts as the team’s main interrogator, often partnered with Wayne Rigsby when attempting to chase down suspects. Due to his former gang affiliations and military background he is street savvy and also highly proficient in and has an extensive knowledge of firearms. He is usually tasked with the more physical nature of the job, such as chasing down suspects and making the arrest.

He is good friends with Rigsby and his deadpan sense of humor and calm demeanor both complements and contrasts Rigsby's happy-go-lucky nature. Fellow CBI agent Sam Bosco even nicknamed Rigsby and Cho "Bert and Ernie" respectively after the eponymous Sesame Street characters. Rigsby has sometimes been the recipient of Cho's deadpan, as shown when Cho mocked him for lacking the courage to ask Van Pelt out in season 2 and also tells him that he had known about the Bert and Ernie nickname but chose not to tell him. They often bet on Jane's abilities and the secret behind his "parlor tricks". In "Bloodstream", Cho is briefly placed in command of the team by LaRoche after Lisbon insults LaRoche. His loyalty to Lisbon is shown in this episode, as he offers to let her call the shots, but she refuses. In one episode, he shows some belief in the supernatural when a witch apparently casts a spell on him.

In season 3 episode "Bloodsport", Cho is forced into an uncomfortable position when he finds out Special Agent Wayne Rigsby, while lying to a parole officer to give his father an alibi, has named him as a person that could corroborate the alibi. Cho is angered and states that in his nearly a decade of service in law enforcement, he has never lied to a fellow officer. Though unhappy about it, when LaRoche questions him, he sides with Rigsby and lies. He eventually forgives Rigsby.

In the third season episode "Rhapsody in Red", he meets a young pickpocket with a similar background to himself when he was young. The pickpocket steals Cho's car, and is later caught and held at CBI headquarters until foster care can take him. Cho ends up helping the kid prove his father, who had been arrested for robbing a store, is innocent. At the end of the episode, father and son are reunited, and Cho laughs as Rigsby reacts to having had his wallet stolen.

Early in season 4, Cho injures his back when he is hit by a car while chasing a suspect. This leaves him with constant and severe pain which he overcomes with the use of painkillers, of which he takes more and more as the pain remains. He falls asleep on the job and it almost costs Rigsby his life. He is later seen flushing the pills down the toilet.

Two years after the events in the episode "Red John", it is revealed that Cho has joined the FBI and had spent months in Quantico for training. He is happy to see Jane again when Jane returns to the US.

== Personal relationships ==
In the season 2 episode "Blood In, Blood Out", Cho is shown as having a girlfriend, Elise Chaye (portrayed by Sandrine Holt), who says he is talking even less than he normally does (because he is worrying about something), implying that he is a reserved man even when in a relationship. He evidently cared deeply for Elise, because after masked men threatened the pair of them and hit her, he became determined to find who they were.

He avoids alcohol, as shown in the episode "His Red Right Hand" when the other agents are drinking shots of tequila in memory of their dead colleagues. Cho raises his glass but does not drink from it, instead taking a sip from a bottle of water. Also, in the episode "A Price Above Rubies", Lisbon accepts a glass of champagne whereas Cho does not at a black tie event they were both attending. Cho is seen drinking in the episode "Red Handed". When the team is celebrating Patrick Jane's casino winnings at a restaurant, the entire team is drinking beer. Cho is seen taking a sip of beer.

In season 4, Cho has a new love interest. Summer (played by Samaire Armstrong) is a prostitute, who first appeared in the episode "Pink Tops". She is questioned by Cho regarding the whereabouts of a drug dealer. She is later appointed by Cho as a CBI informant. A strong chemistry is shown between the two. Summer also notices Cho has a severe backache. In the episode "At First Blush", Summer confronts Cho after he fires her, saying she wants her job back and she has "given up everything else for this job". She asks him to admit he is firing her because he has feelings for her and doesn't know how to handle it. He admits he likes her. Summer slaps him, and after realizing what he said, kisses him. Cho is taken by surprise, but starts kissing her back. The two share a passionate kiss in the elevator. After Summer proves to be emotionally immature and damaged, Cho encourages her to move to Seattle to live with her sister and enroll in community college.

In the season 5 episode, Panama Red, a pregnant Summer returns to Sacramento and becomes a suspect in a counterfeiting operation. Summer tells Cho she was in the wrong place at the wrong time. With Cho's help, (he manipulates the main suspect and the Assistant D.A., Ardiles) charges against her are dropped and she goes free. This costs Cho the confidence of the Gangs unit leader who was the arresting officer in Summer's case. As it turns out, Summer was in town with her fiancé, a man named Marshal who knows nothing of her past. At the end of the episode, she introduces Cho to her fiancé and they depart to get married.
