= Eoghan Mahony =

American television writer and producer

- Born: United States
- Occupations: Television writer, producer
- Years active: 2007–present

Eoghan Mahony is an American television writer and producer known for his work on Rome, Drive and Star Wars: The Clone Wars. He served as a staff writer and co-executive producer on the CBS crime drama The Mentalist.

== Television work ==
=== Early career ===
Mahony began his career working as a story editor on the second season of the HBO period drama Rome; he also wrote a second season episode. After which he worked as a co-producer on the short-lived Drive and was then recruited to write on the first season of The Mentalist. He has also written a number of episodes of the animated series Star Wars: The Clone Wars.

=== Episodes by Mahony ===
==== Rome ====
- "Philippi" (2.06)

==== Star Wars: The Clone Wars ====
- "Hostage Crisis" (1.22)
- "Legacy of Terror" (2.07)
- "R2 Come Home" (2.21)
- "Supply Lines" (3.03) (with Steven Melching)

==== The Mentalist ====
- "Red Brick and Ivy" (1.10)
- "Paint it Red" (1.13)
- "Red Sauce" (1.20)
- "A Price Above Rubies" (2.09)
- "Red Letter" (2.22)
- "The Red Ponies" (3.05)
- "Bloodsport" (3.11)
- "Redacted" (3.20)
- "Blood and Sand" (4.05)
- "Red is the New Black" (4.13)
- "Pink Champagne on Ice" (4.19)
- "If It Bleeds, It Leads" (5.07)
- "Red Lacquer Nail Polish" (5.15)
- "Behind the Red Curtain" (5.18) (with Erika Green Swafford)
- "The Red Tattoo" (6.05)
- "White as the Driven Snow" (6.15)
- "Brown Eyed Girls" (6.19) (with Michael Weiss)
