= Tim Kang =

American actor (born 1973)

- Born: Yila Timothy Kang; March 16, 1973 (age 53); California, U.S.
- Education: University of California, Berkeley (BA); Harvard University (MFA)
- Occupation: Actor
- Years active: 2002–present
- Spouse: Gina May
- Children: 1

Korean name
- Hangul: 강일아
- Hanja: 康一芽
- RR: Gang Ila
- MR: Kang Ira

Yila Timothy Kang (born March 16, 1973) is an American actor. He is known for his role as Kimball Cho in the television series The Mentalist and Gordon Katsumoto in the reboot series Magnum P.I.

== Early life and education ==
Kang was born in California, and is the eldest of three brothers. He graduated with a Bachelor of Arts in political science from the University of California, Berkeley, and a Master of Fine Arts from Harvard's Institute for Advanced Theater Training at the American Repertory Theater and the Moscow Art Theatre.

Kang began acting at age 26. He had been working in the finance industry at the Pacific Exchange when he passed by the American Conservatory Theater and signed up for night acting classes on a whim. In an interview with the Korea Society, he stated that he decided to switch to acting full-time when he realized that he could no longer concentrate on his day job at the exchange.

== Career ==
Kang was a series regular on CBS's The Mentalist as Special Agent Kimball Cho. He appeared in Rambo (2008) and on TV shows like The Office, Chappelle's Show, The Vampire Diaries, and Monk. He returned to his theater roots for Julia Cho's new play Aubergine, playing one of the lead characters, Ray. It premiered at the Berkeley Repertory Theatre in February 2016 before touring to various theatres.

In 2012, Kang launched a production company named One Shoot Films with its first film project focusing on child abduction and sexually abused children. Kang recurred as Ivan Hess on Marvel's Cloak & Dagger. He was a series regular as Detective Gordon Katsumoto in the 2018 reboot of Magnum P.I. CBS cancelled the series after four seasons but he continued in the role when the series was picked up for a fifth and final season by NBC.

== Personal life ==
Kang has a black belt in Taekwondo.

With wife actress Gina Marie May, Kang has a daughter, Bianca Jooyung Kang, born November 7, 2009.

Kang is a national spokesman and active supporter for the National Center for Missing & Exploited Children.

== Filmography ==
=== Film ===
Year	Title	Role	Notes
2002	Two Weeks Notice	Paul the attorney	
2003	Robot Stories	Young John	
2003	Justice	Bodega owner	
2004	The Forgotten	Agent Alec Wong	
2006	Spectropia	Client	
2006	What Remains	Ender	
2008	Rambo	En-Joo	
2010	Mister Green	Mason Park	
2018	A Wrinkle in Time	School superintendent	
2018	Dark, Deadly, & Dreadful	Dr. Ken	Horror Anthology film; appears in segment "Room 731"; also executive producer
2021	Traces	Mark	

=== Television ===
Year	Title	Role	Notes
2002	The Sopranos	Dr. Harrison Wong	Episode: "Whoever Did This"
2003	Law & Order: Criminal Intent	Murakami	Episode: "Legion"
2004	Third Watch	Detective Gary Yoshimura	Recurring role, 5 episodes
2005	Law & Order: Trial by Jury	Dr. Liam Kelly	Episode: "Baby Boom"
2006	Chappelle's Show	Car wash manager / Mummy's probation officer	Episodes 3.1 & 3.3
2006	Ghost Whisperer	Warren Chen (burning ghost)	Episode: "The Night We Met"
2007	Monk	William Lee	Episode: "Mr. Monk Is Up All Night"
2007	The Office	Koh	Episode: "Local Ad"
2007	The Unit	Chaplain Alan Lantz	Episodes: "Gone Missing", "Play 16"
2008–15	The Mentalist	Agent Kimball Cho	Main role, 151 episodes
2015	The Vampire Diaries	Oscar	Episodes: 7.3, 7.4 and 7.5
2015	Criminal Minds	Charlie Senarak	Episode: "The Witness"
2017	The Trustee	Wu	Television Movie
2017	Chicago Justice	Detective Steve Kim	Episode: "Fool Me Twice"
2017	American Horror Story: Cult	Tom Chang	Episode: "Election Night"
2018	Lethal Weapon	Mike Serrano	Episode: "Diggin' Up Dirt"
2018	Madam Secretary	Neal Shin	Episode: "The Things We Get to Say"
2018	Cloak & Dagger	Ivan Hess	Recurring role, 4 episodes
2018–24	Magnum P.I.	Detective Gordon Katsumoto	Main role

=== Video games (voice roles) ===
Year	Title	Role	Notes
2016	Mirror's Edge Catalyst	Dogen	
2017	Prey	Morgan Yu / January (male)	

=== Podcasts ===
Year	Title	Role	Notes
2025-	The TV Police: A Rewatch Podcast of the Mentalist with Owain Yeoman & Tim Kang	Himself	Also executive producer
