= Bruno Heller =

British screenwriter and producer (born 1960)

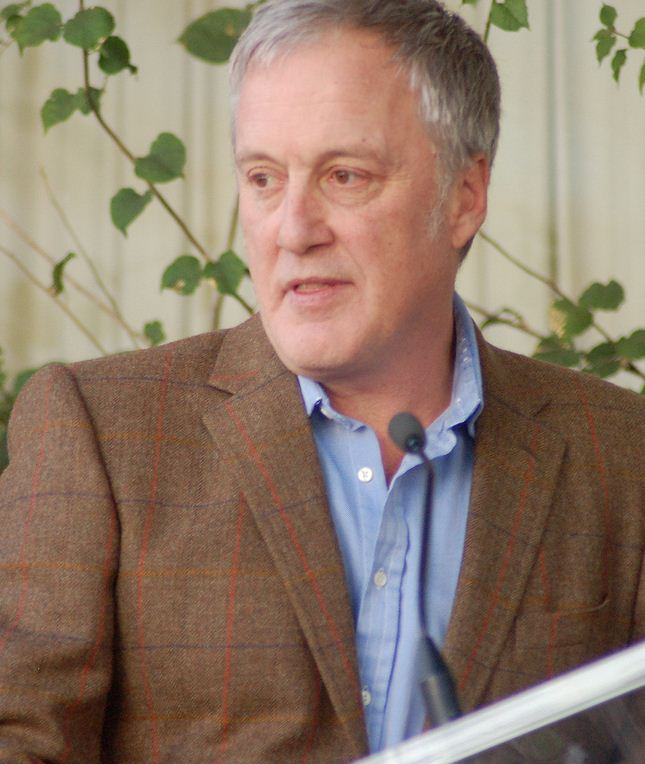
- Bruno Heller at the Hollywood Walk of Fame in February 2013.
- Born: 13 January 1960 (age 66); London, England, UK
- Occupations: Screenwriter, producer, director
- Years active: 1994–present
- Notable work: Rome; The Mentalist; Gotham; Pennyworth
- Style: Urban drama Crime drama
- Spouse: Miranda Cowley Heller
- Parent(s): Lukas Heller; Caroline Carter
- Relatives: Zoë Heller (sister); Cordelia Edvardson (aunt); Hermann Heller (grandfather)

Bruno Heller (born 13 January 1960) is a British screenwriter, producer and director. He is known for creating the HBO television series Rome, the CBS television series The Mentalist, the FOX television series Gotham, based on the Batman franchise, and co-creating the Gotham prequel television series Pennyworth, based on the Batman and V for Vendetta franchises, for Epix and HBO Max.

== Early life and family ==
Heller's father, Lukas, was a German Jewish emigre and screenwriter (Hush… Hush, Sweet Charlotte, What Ever Happened to Baby Jane?). His mother, Caroline (née Carter), was an English Quaker and instrumental in keeping up the Labour Party's "Save London Transport Campaign". He has three siblings, one older, Lucy, and 2 younger Emily and Zoë, a columnist and writer who has published three novels, including Notes on a Scandal.

Heller graduated from the University of Sussex.

== Career ==
Heller was a union soundman working in England in the 1980s. While working as a soundman on a series of films about England's Miners' Strike, Heller met Portuguese director Eduardo Guedes. The two collaborated on what would become Heller's first writing credit, the 1994 film pax starring Amanda Plummer.

He left England for New York, where he met his wife, Miranda Cowley. After five years in the city, Heller moved with his family to Los Angeles where he worked on various television dramas including two projects for the USA Network: Touching Evil (American TV series) and The Huntress. But his breakthrough came with Rome, which he co-created. After the cancellation of that series for its high costs, Heller created The Mentalist. In September 2012, Heller sold a legal drama named The Advocates to CBS, which was written and executive produced by him, but the project finally did not go to series. In 2014 Heller created a TV series based on the Batman character James Gordon called Gotham for Fox Broadcasting Company.

=== Rome ===
Along with John Milius and William J. Macdonald, Heller created the television series Rome, co-produced by HBO and the BBC. Heller was also an executive producer and head writer, writing 11 episodes for the series, including the pilot episode and the series finale.

The series primarily chronicles the lives and deeds of the rich, powerful, and "historically significant", yet it also focuses on the lives, fortunes, families, and acquaintances of two common men: Lucius Vorenus and Titus Pullo, two Roman soldiers mentioned historically in Caesar's Commentarii de Bello Gallico. The fictionalised Vorenus and Pullo manage to witness and often influence many of the historical events presented in the series.

==== Rome episodes written by Heller ====
Season 1

- "The Stolen Eagle" (pilot)
- "How Titus Pullo Brought Down the Republic"
- "An Owl in a Thornbush"
- "Stealing from Saturn"
- "The Ram has Touched the Wall"
- "Egeria" (with John Milius)
- "The Spoils"
- "Kalends of February" (season finale)

Season 2

- "Passover"
- "Son of Hades"
- "De Patre Vostro (About Your Father)" (series finale)

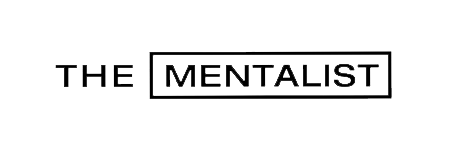
The intertitle for season 1.

=== The Mentalist ===
In 2008, Heller created the CBS television series, The Mentalist, with his production company Primrose Hill Productions in association with Warner Bros. Television. On 7 January 2009, the show won the award for "Favorite New TV Drama" at the 35th People's Choice Awards and since then, the star, Simon Baker has received several nominations for his portrayal of the lead character, Patrick Jane. Heller served as showrunner from season 1 to season 6. He departed the show before season 7 to focus on Gotham.

The Mentalist follows Patrick Jane, an independent consultant for the California Bureau of Investigation (CBI) based in Sacramento, California. He has a remarkable track record for solving serious crimes by using his amazing skills of observation. Jane also makes frequent use of his mentalist abilities and his semi-celebrity past as a psychic medium using paranormal abilities he now admits he feigned. He abandoned his pretence out of remorse when his attention-seeking behaviour attracted the attention of a serial killer named Red John who killed his wife and daughter.

==== The Mentalist episodes written by Heller ====
Season 1

- "Pilot"
- "Red Hair and Silver Tape"
- "Red John's Friends"
- "Carnelian, Inc."
- "Red John's Footsteps" (season finale)

Season 2

- "Redemption"
- "Black Gold and Red Blood"
- "Code Red"
- "Red Sky in the Morning" (season finale)

Season 3

- "Red Sky at Night"
- "Red Moon"
- "Strawberries and Cream (Part 2)" (season finale)

Season 4

- "Scarlet Ribbons"
- "Cheap Burgundy" (writer/director)
- "The Crimson Hat" (season finale)

Season 5

- "The Crimson Ticket"
- "Red John's Rules" (season finale)

Season 6

- "The Desert Rose"
- "Red John"
- "Blue Bird" (season finale)

Season 7

- "White Orchids" (series finale) with Tom Szentgyörgyi & Jordan Harper

=== Gotham ===
In 2013, Fox won a bidding war for a pilot set in Gotham written by Heller.

As originally conceived, the series serves as a straightforward story of Jim Gordon's early days on the Gotham City Police force. The show includes not only the Bruce Wayne character, but also the origin stories of several Batman villains, including the Penguin, the Riddler, Catwoman, Two-Face, Poison Ivy and Scarecrow. The first season consisted of 22 episodes after being extended from sixteen.

The show premiered on 22 September 2014 and concluded on 25 April 2019.

==== Gotham episodes written by Heller ====
Season 1

- "Pilot"
- "Selina Kyle"
- "Penguin's Umbrella"
- "The Blind Fortune Teller"
- "All Happy Families Are Alike" (season finale)

Season 2

- "Damned If You Do..."
- "Worse Than a Crime"
- "Transference" (season finale)

=== Pennyworth ===
In 2018/19 Heller co-created Pennyworth. This series focuses on the early years of Alfred Pennyworth, friend, surrogate father, and butler to Bruce Wayne/Batman. A direct prequel to both Gotham and V for Vendetta, the series explores Alfred's origins as a former British soldier running a private security firm (and later a bar) in an alternate history 1960s England, as he goes to work with CIA agent Thomas Wayne – Batman's father, while coming into conflict with the fascist Raven Society/Union while in the throes of a British Civil War, in the years preceding the rise of the Norsefire regime, with the third season introducing predecessors to the anarchist V.

The show premiered on 28 July 2019 and concluded on 24 November 2022.

==== Pennyworth episodes written by Heller ====
Season 1

- "Pilot"
- "The Landlord's Daughter"
- "Martha Kane"
- "Lady Penelope"
- "Shirley Bassey"
- "Cilla Black"
- "Alma Cogan"
- "Marianne Faithfull" (season finale)

Season 2

- "The Heavy Crown"
- "The Burning Bridge"
- "The Rose and Thorn"
- "The Lion and Lamb" (season finale)

Season 3

- "Well to Do"
- "Highland Wedding" (series finale)

== Personal life ==
In 1993, Heller married Miranda Cowley Heller, then a senior vice president at HBO, and the New York Times No. 1 bestselling author of the novel, The Paper Palace. The couple has two children.

== Filmography ==
=== Television ===
Year	Title	Creator	Director	Writer	Executive producer	Notes
2000	The Huntress	No	No	Yes	No	Wrote 5 episodes
2001	Touching Evil (American TV series)	No	No	Yes	No	Pilot
2005-2007	Rome (TV series)	Yes	No	Yes	Yes	Co-created with John Milius and William J. Macdonald, wrote and produced 11 episodes
2008	The Mentalist	Yes	Yes	Yes	Yes	
2014	Gotham (TV series)	Yes	No	Yes	Yes	
2019	Pennyworth (TV series)	Yes	No	Yes	Yes	

=== Film ===
Year	Title	Writer	Notes
1994	pax	Yes	
