= List of The Mentalist characters =

The characters from the American police procedural television series The Mentalist were created by Bruno Heller. The Mentalist debuted on September 23, 2008, on CBS and follows Simon Baker as Patrick Jane, an independent consultant for the California Bureau of Investigation (CBI) based in Sacramento, California. He has a remarkable track record for solving serious crimes by using his refined skills of observation. Jane also makes frequent use of his mentalist abilities and his semi-celebrity past as a psychic medium using the paranormal abilities he now admits he feigned. He abandoned his pretense out of remorse when his attention-seeking behavior attracted the attention of a serial killer, Red John, who murdered Jane's wife and daughter.

== Main characters ==
Name	Portrayed by	Position	Assignment	Seasons						
Name	Portrayed by	Position	Assignment	1	2	3	4	5	6	7
Patrick Jane	Simon Baker	Consultant	former member of Lisbon's Serious Crime Unit; member of Abbott's team in FBI Austin office	Main						
Teresa Lisbon	Robin Tunney	CBI special agent	former leader of the Serious Crime Unit; member of Abbott's team in FBI Austin office	Main						
Kimball Cho	Tim Kang	CBI supervisory special agent	former member of Lisbon's Serious Crime Unit; member of Abbott's team in FBI Austin office	Main						
Wayne Rigsby	Owain Yeoman	CBI special agent	former member of Lisbon's Serious Crime Unit	Main						Guest
Grace Van Pelt	Amanda Righetti	CBI special agent	former member of Lisbon's Serious Crime Unit	Main						Guest
Dennis Abbott	Rockmond Dunbar	FBI supervisory special agent	leader of FBI Austin Office						Main	
Kim Fischer	Emily Swallow	FBI senior special agent	member of Abbott's team in FBI Austin office						Main	
Jason Wylie	Joe Adler	FBI special agent	member of Abbott's team in FBI Austin office						Recurring	Main
Michelle Vega	Josie Loren	FBI special agent	member of Abbott's team in FBI Austin office							Main

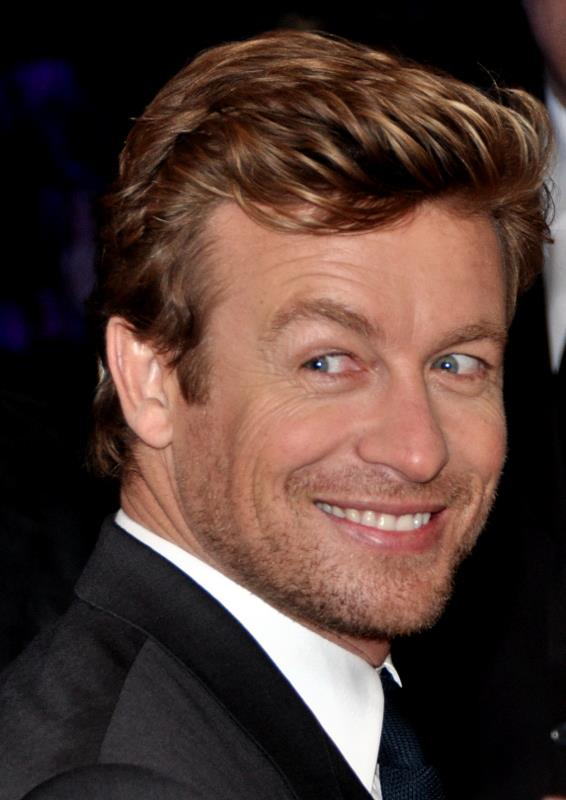
Lead actor Simon Baker in 2013.

- Simon Baker as consultant Patrick Jane—the show's protagonist and the titular mentalist. Jane spent his childhood in traveling carnivals with his mean-spirited con-man father who taught him to see all outsiders as marks. After meeting his wife, Angela Ruskin, who was also a carny, the pair left carnival life. Honing the skills his father taught him, Jane became a successful psychic and medium. After using his "psychic" skills to demeaningly describe serial killer Red John on television, which resulted in the murders of Angela and their daughter Charlotte Jane, Patrick works as a criminal consultant for CBI and later (season 6) for the FBI. He has developed close friendships with his colleagues, especially his boss, Senior Special Agent Teresa Lisbon. He is driven by inconsolable remorse over the deaths of his wife and daughter, and while he usually presents a jocular, teasing face, he shows his darker side when dealing with his nemesis. At those times, Jane becomes intense, focused, and willing to go to great lengths to capture and even kill him. He owns a classic French car, a robin's egg blue Citroën DS, and is an avid tea drinker. He marries Teresa Lisbon in the series finale, "White Orchids".
- Robin Tunney as Special Agent in Charge/Special Agent Teresa Lisbon—formerly special agent in charge with the CBI and leader of the Serious Crime Unit, now (as of season 6) a special agent with the FBI. Though Jane often annoys her with his unusual behavior, she views him as a valuable member of the team. Likewise, she is the only member of the team Jane trusts with details of his past. Lisbon's mother was killed in a drunk driving crash, leaving her to care for her brothers and her abusive, alcoholic father. Her team was responsible for the Red John case, although the responsibility for catching Red John was taken over briefly by Sam Bosco, her mentor when she was a junior agent, until he and his team were murdered by one of Red John's operatives. She marries Patrick Jane in the series finale, "White Orchids" and it's revealed they are expecting their first child.
- Tim Kang as Special Agent Kimball Cho—formerly a special agent with the CBI and a member of Lisbon's Serious Crime Unit, now (as of season 6) a Special Agent with the FBI. Cho has a dry, deadpan sense of humor and is good friends with his partner on Lisbon's team, Special Agent Wayne Rigsby. He is often the one who sees through Patrick's parlor tricks. Although he was secretly called Ernie by the Bosco team (who also refer to Rigsby as Bert), Cho claims not to mind as "Ernie's the clever, handsome one". He was a member of a street gang, the Avon Park Playboys, which garnered him a juvenile, though sealed, record and time in juvenile hall. He enlisted in the Army, serving in Special Forces, before becoming a police officer. Because of his difficult childhood, Cho often tries to befriend young people who have committed crimes but are not yet lost causes. In Season 7, Cho is promoted to supervisory agent due to Abbott's transfer to Washington with his wife. In the following episode, he holds a dying Vega in his arms as she dies from a bullet wound. Cho is devastated, showing a rare moment he breaks down in tears
- Owain Yeoman as Special Agent Wayne Rigsby—formerly a special agent with the CBI and a member of Lisbon's Serious Crime Unit, now (as of season 6) co-head of a private security firm with Van Pelt. Rigsby serves as the team's arson specialist, leaning on his two years as a San Diego arson investigator. Rigsby is good friends with his partner Cho and has developed romantic feelings for another team member, Grace Van Pelt. Although against regulations, the two began seeing each other secretly. Although the pair later ended the relationship, after it became public, to protect both of their careers, they remain close friends. Rigsby has had to endure various professional and personal difficulties as a result of the actions of his father, a former career criminal involved in a notorious biker gang. At the end of season 4, Rigsby has a son, Benjamin, with ex-girlfriend Sarah Harrigan. In season 5, he reignites his relationship with Van Pelt and marries her in season 6. He returns in the series finale to attend Jane and Lisbon's wedding.
- Amanda Righetti as Special Agent Grace Van Pelt—formerly a special agent with the CBI and a member of Lisbon's Serious Crime Unit, now (as of season 6) co-head of a private security firm with Rigsby. She was Lisbon's team's newest member. She has a deep belief in spirituality and mysticism, and will butt heads with Patrick when he dismisses supposedly psychic phenomena or otherwise does or says something offensive or inappropriate. She continues to be close to Rigsby despite their relationship coming to an end. She has a subdued personality and is very organized, which leads Jane to deduce during the first season that this is because she is hiding some deep emotional trauma. She was engaged to FBI Agent Craig O'Laughlin, whom she was forced to kill after he was revealed to be a Red John operative intent on killing Teresa Lisbon and Madeline Hightower. In season 5, she rekindles her relationship with Rigsby and marries him in season 6. She returns in the series finale to witness Jane and Lisbon's marriage.
- Rockmond Dunbar as Special Agent Dennis Abbott—a supervisory agent with the FBI in the field office in Austin, Texas. He persuades Jane to join his FBI team in exchange for dropping all charges against Jane for killing Red John. He initially has a strict, no-nonsense attitude towards Jane, but later warms to him. Abbott's career is threatened in season 7 when his former boss, Bill Peterson, recovers evidence against Abbott during his Rio Bravo operation. Jane formulates a plan to save Abbott and Peterson is arrested instead. He transfers to Washington with his wife Lena.
- Emily Swallow as Special Agent Kim Fischer—an FBI special agent in the field office in Austin, Texas. Driven and ambitious, she is Abbott's second-in-command. She goes undercover to persuade Jane to return to America after two years abroad as a fugitive, and is given the task of supervising Jane in the field. It was mentioned in the season 7 premiere episode "Nothing But Blue Skies" that she transferred to the Seattle FBI office to be with her mother who had a stroke.
- Joe Adler as Jason Wylie—a young, quirky analyst at the FBI who quickly gains a name within Abbott's team with his technological expertise. Wylie is an enthusiastic computer expert for the team who usually handles tasks on the surveillance end, occasionally helping Jane with small favors as well.
- Josie Loren as Special Agent Michelle Vega—a rookie FBI agent recently graduated from Quantico and new in Abbott's team. She is killed in action in the season 7 episode "Nothing Gold Can Stay".

== Recurring characters ==
- Xander Berkeley as Red John—the show's leading antagonist (real name Thomas McAllister), a serial killer known to have murdered at least 28 people, including Patrick Jane's wife and daughter. The character first appeared (as McAllister) in the second episode of Season 1. Red John appears to enjoy toying with and taunting Jane, but saves his life when Jane is about to be killed by a Red John copycat. Although Red John's crimes and "associates" are portrayed in every season of the series, the character was only seen on-screen twice (in the Season 2 Finale, "Red Sky in the Morning" and Season 4 episode "Red Is the New Black"), in disguise or with his face hidden, until the revelation of his true identity in the Season 6 episode "Red John". McAllister is the sheriff of Napa County and heads the Blake Association, a clandestine criminal organization of corrupt California law enforcement officials. He is killed by Jane in "Red John" Season 6, Episode 8.
- Gregory Itzin as CBI Director Virgil Minelli—the former CBI Director of the CBI until the Season 2 episode "His Red Right Hand". Minelli was an effective team leader, but is exhausted by years of political battles with his subordinates and superiors. Minelli is finally pushed to his breaking point following the murders of Bosco and his team by Rebecca, their secretary and a member of Red John's network, as these were the first agents ever to die under his command. Minelli then retired to a quiet life as a fisherman and was replaced by Madeleine Hightower. In the Season 3 episode "Jolly Red Elf", Minelli agrees to help Jane investigate Red John's network. Minelli returns in the 100th episode of the show, a flashback episode when he was still the special agent in charge of Lisbon's team. It is revealed that he agreed to give information about Jane to the FBI.
- Aunjanue Ellis as Supervising Agent Madeleine Hightower—the former special agent in charge of the CBI. In the Season 2 episode "The Red Box", Hightower arrives to take command, replacing Virgil Minelli. Despite adopting a hard-nosed, by-the-book approach to managing both the CBI and Jane, she maintains an efficient and friendly relationship with the team, particularly with Jane, who is prodigious at closing cases. A divorcee, she has two children. In Season 3, Hightower is among Agent J.J. LaRoche's five suspects in the Todd Johnson murder, and is considered a prime suspect owing to her previous relationship with one of Johnson's victims. After planted evidence is found at the murder scene of Johnson's accomplice, Hightower becomes a wanted fugitive. After hiding her in the trunk of LaRoche's personal car and helping her escape, Jane works throughout Season 3 to identify the true CBI mole. The season culminates with FBI Agent O'Laughlin revealing himself as a Red John mole and being shot dead by Hightower and Van Pelt after he shoots Lisbon. Hightower makes an appearance in the season 6 episode "Red Listed", briefly coming out of hiding to help Jane as he attempts to learn more about Bob Kirkland and his link to Red John.
- Pruitt Taylor Vince as Special Agent/Supervising Agent J.J. LaRoche—the head of CBI's Internal Affairs. He arrives in the Season 3 episode "Jolly Red Elf" as the new head of the CBI's Professional Standards Unit. Following the death of Todd Johnson, a member of Red John's network, LaRoche is brought in to question Lisbon's team and quickly shown to be Jane's intellectual equal in addition to being quirky, charmless, and socially awkward. Although initially considering Jane as a prime suspect, LaRoche ultimately names Agent Hightower the killer and is appointed to take over Hightower's duties as the team's supervisor after Hightower goes into hiding. LaRoche quickly asserts command when he briefly removes Lisbon as team leader. In Season 4, LaRoche leaves his temporary assignment and returns to Professional Services. LaRoche returns in Season 5's "Blood Feud" to investigate Rigsby's shooting of the gang leader who had caused the death of Rigsby's father. Although LaRoche officially reports Rigsby acted in the line of duty, he privately makes it clear he believes Jane manipulated events so Rigsby could avenge his father. In "Black Helicopters", he is killed by a booby-trapped shotgun while helping Rigsby with an investigation into the murder of Osvaldo Ardiles. The murderer is later revealed to be a suspect from a previous CBI case, Richard Haibach who had been abducted and tortured by Bob Kirkland.
- Michael Rady as Supervising Agent Luther Wainwright—In the season 4 episode "Ring Around the Rosie", Wainwright takes command of Lisbon's team. Quite young, he is intelligent, but often seems to take a secondary role in Lisbon's cases. In the Season 4 finale, "The Crimson Hat", he is the victim of one of Red John's plots, and is found bound and gagged in the back seat of the car in which Lorelei Martins arrives when Jane falsely informs her he has killed Lisbon. After a firefight, Wainwright is found shot and killed in the back seat; it is not clear if he was shot dead by the FBI by mistake or was already dead in the back seat. After his death, CBI director Gale Bertram oversees Lisbon and her team directly.
- Michael Gaston as CBI Director Gale Bertram—CBI director who first appeared in the Season 3 premiere, "Red Sky at Night". Bertram has been shown to be well aware of Lisbon's team and her effectiveness at closing cases. In the Season 3 finale, it is revealed Bertram was among LaRoche's five suspects in the Todd Johnson murder. While initially the team believes Bertram was Red John's plant and Johnson's killer, FBI Agent Craig O'Laughlin is later revealed to be the Red John operative who killed Johnson. In Season 4, Bertram suspends Lisbon and her team in retaliation for their suspicions. In the fifth-season finale, he is revealed to be one of the seven men on Jane's list of Red John suspects. Eventually he is revealed to be a member of the Blake Association, and is killed on Red John's orders in "Red John".
- Catherine Dent as FBI Agent Susan Darcy—the FBI agent assigned to the Panzer case in season 4 episode "Blinking Red Light". In the episodes "Always Bet on Red" and "Cheap Burgundy", she is suspicious of Jane's claim Red John is dead and tries to convince Jane to tell her the truth. Although Red John is in fact alive, Jane doesn't want Darcy to find out, as Red John would kill her for having such knowledge. Jane later admits to Darcy that Red John is alive, after the morgue attendant she questioned is murdered, only to have her accuse Jane of being a Red John accomplice and vow to Wainwright she will bring Jane down. Darcy, while seeking to deepen her familiarity with Jane and gain his confidence, reveals (claims) she lost a sister to drowning, for which she claims to blame herself. After Wainwright is killed during an operation, in which CBI faked Lisbon and Rigby's deaths in an attempt to catch Red John. Darcy's interference in the investigation, led her to attempt to catch Red John unsuccessfully (in "The Crimson Hat"), Reede Smith revealed she has a nervous breakdown.
- Rebecca Wisocky as Brenda Shettrick—the head of the CBI's Media Relations Unit. She works with the media and leads outreach programs and other efforts to the public. In the Season 3 finale, Shettrick was one of the five suspects in the Todd Johnson murder. In the Season 5 episode, "Red and Itchy", she is exposed and arrested after being found to have been leaking information on CBI operations to criminals, including Tommy Volker. She was blackmailing LaRoche over the contents of the tupperware container which was stolen from his home, but the blackmailing charges will be dropped as long as she agrees not to reveal what was in the tupperware container, which Jane never opens and stops Rigsby from opening during the same episode. (Lisbon later learns what grisly item is actually likely to be in the container.) Shettrick is not accused of being or considered to be a Red John operative.
- Kevin Corrigan as Bob Kirkland—a mysterious Homeland Security Agent who seems to be as obsessed with Red John as Patrick Jane. His involvement in the Red John matter included trying to find the now-deceased Lorelei Martins and killing the comatose Red John operative Jason Lennon. He made two other Homeland Security agents break into Jane's loft at CBI to photograph and copy Jane's information on Red John. He reproduced a near-exact version of Jane's old bulletin board, which was later revealed in the fourth episode of season six to be fake information Jane planted. On the fifth-season finale, it was revealed Kirkland was one of Jane's seven final Red John suspects. Eventually, it was revealed Kirkland was pursuing Red John to avenge his twin brother, who was one of Red John's accomplices and presumed to have died at Red John's hands. Kirkland was killed by Reede Smith in the season six episode "Red Listed".
- David Norona as DDA Osvaldo Ardiles—an ambitious Assistant District Attorney (ADA). Ardiles comes into conflict with the CBI team when he tries to convict an innocent man of armed robbery in an effort to get information on a powerful Mafia group. Furious after Cho proves the man's innocence, Ardiles remains hostile to the entire team, especially Jane, and cuts off all assistance from the DA's office. In the Season 3 finale, it's revealed Ardiles was among Agent LaRoche's five suspects in the Todd Johnson murder. In the Season 4 premiere, Ardiles, at Bertram's directive, charges Jane with killing Timothy Carter, but Jane is acquitted by a jury he masterfully manipulates.
- Leslie Hope as Kristina Frye—a psychic who occasionally works with the CBI. Although initially at odds, due to Jane's belief psychics do not exist, the two began to work well together. As time goes by, Frye helps out with more murder cases, and romantic feelings spark between her and Jane. In the Season 2 finale, Frye is put under protection by the CBI when she attempts to reach out to Red John only to disappear from her heavily guarded home. In the Season 3 episode "Blood on His Hands", Frye is found alive but unresponsive four months after disappearing. Jane attempts to communicate with her in a séance, but she has no memory of the events of her disappearance and can offer no information regarding Red John. She is, to date, catatonic, and presumably institutionalized.
- Terry Kinney as Special Agent Sam Bosco—a senior special agent with the CBI and another team leader. He was Lisbon's mentor when she was a junior agent, and despite being married, he had strong romantic feelings for her. When Bosco became an investigative team leader in the new Serial Crimes Unit, Virgil Minelli gave Bosco the responsibility for catching Red John. However, Jane did not trust Bosco to properly investigate the Red John case and Bosco viewed Jane as untrustworthy and unreliable. In the Season 2 episode "His Red Right Hand", Bosco's team was murdered by Rebecca, their secretary and a member of Red John's network. Arriving at the hospital in critical condition, Bosco confesses his feelings for Lisbon and makes his peace with Jane, who vows to eventually kill Red John. Bosco then dies.
- Eric Winter as FBI Special Agent Craig O'Laughlin—a special agent-in-charge who first meets the CBI team while jointly investigating Visualize. The handsome O'Laughlin catches the attention of Van Pelt and the two start a relationship. In the episode "Blood for Blood", O'Laughlin asks Van Pelt to marry him and she agrees. It is revealed that he is a former National Football League player who knew (and fondly remembers) Van Pelt's father as well as a learned traveler of the Far East. In the Season 3 finale, it's revealed O'Laughlin is among Agent LaRoche's five suspects in the Todd Johnson murder. In a showdown at Hightower's hideout, O'Laughlin shoots Lisbon and reveals himself to be the true Red John plant/accomplice. After it was initially believed that CBI director Gale Bertram is the murderer, Lisbon musters enough strength to distract O'Laughlin, Van Pelt and Hightower fatally shoot him in tandem. He reappears one last time to help Van Pelt whilst she is being hunted down.
- Bradley Whitford as Fake Red John/Timothy Carter—a deviant, child abductor, and Red John operative. In season 3's final episode "Strawberries and Cream", after O'Laughlin is killed by Van Pelt and Hightower, Jane (who is in a food court in a Sacramento mall with Gale Bertram, who leaves in a huff over what he says is a waste of his time) has Lisbon use the redial on O'Laughlin's phone and tell whoever answers O'Laughlin is dead. Seeing Carter answer the phone, Jane approaches him and Carter hints he is Red John. After revealing personal details of the murders of his wife and daughter, Jane kills him. We later learn in the Season 4 premiere that Carter was not the true Red John after Jane tricks Carter's wife into revealing that the Carters had actually abducted the young girl they had publicly pretended to look for. Mrs. Carter later commits suicide in prison. In the Season 4 episode "Little Red Book", Jane enlists the help of Rosalind Harker, Red John's blind sometime companion, who confirms (by touching Carter's face) that he was not Red John.
- Jillian Bach as ADA Sarah Harrigan—a public defender whom the team first meet in the Season 3 episode "Every Rose Has Its Thorn". During the case, Harrigan and Rigsby began a relationship which continues through Season 4 and in "My Bloody Valentine", she announces she is pregnant, apparently by Rigsby. In "Black Cherry", it is revealed she has been hired as an Assistant District Attorney (ADA). Eventually she and Rigsby break up.
- Samaire Armstrong as Summer Edgecombe—a prostitute recruited by Cho as a confidential informant in Season 4. In "At First Blush", Cho admits to having feelings for her and a romance develops. Edgecombe and Cho part ways in episode "So Long, and Thanks for All the Red Snapper" when she decamps to her sister's home and enters rehab. In the fifth season, she reappears, pregnant by her fiancé.
- Emmanuelle Chriqui as Lorelei Martins—Red John acolyte, posing as a cocktail waitress. Red John sends her to meet and seduce Jane in "The Crimson Hat"; she is later captured alive by the CBI at the end of Season 4. Though Jane and the CBI team are intent on interrogating Martins, they are foiled by the FBI, who have her remanded to their custody. She is shown at the beginning of the fifth season to be in a women's prison, still loyal to Red John, but resigned to prison life, apparently. She escapes with the help of Jane (and Bret Stiles). Jane has discovered evidence suggesting Red John and his operatives murdered her sister and manages her escape so she can find out the truth and then return to help him find Red John, but she reneges on her promise to name Red John. She is killed by Red John in the end of "There Will Be Blood".
- Malcolm McDowell as Bret Stiles—the leader of the Visualize Self-Realization Center church (simply called "Visualize"). Stiles is a friendly and ambitious church leader who has succeeded in deflecting numerous investigations and has hinted to Jane he has inside knowledge about Red John. In Season 3, Stiles provides information that helps Jane and the CBI find the catatonic Kristina Frye. Although Stiles leaves, purportedly to expand Visualize to Jakarta, Indonesia, he returns in the Season 4 episode "His Thoughts Were Red Thoughts", and is charged with murdering an anti-cult activist. Jane, however, helps prove Stiles' innocence. Stiles repays the favor by helping Jane break Lorelei Martins out of prison. In the fifth-season finale, he is revealed to be one of the seven final Red John suspects. In the sixth-season episode "Fire and Brimstone," Jane gathers Bret and the other surviving suspects at a house. Bret is killed in an explosion that allows Red John to escape.
- Pedro Pascal as Special Agent Marcus Pike—an agent in the FBI's art theft department who develops a romance with Lisbon following the completing of their first case together. Pike later offers Lisbon a chance to move with him to Washington, D.C., in light of his new job offer, a proposal Lisbon takes time to consider before finally accepting, as well a subsequent marriage proposal. Pike is aware of slight friction between himself, Lisbon, and Jane, but is open-minded and compassionate, and generally understanding. Lisbon accepts Pike's proposal after Jane deceives her in order to delay her departure for Washington, but then breaks off the engagement following Jane's confession that he loves Lisbon.

== Minor characters ==
- David Warshofsky as Donald "Donny" Culpepper—a professional thief who the CBI encounter in the season 2 episode "A Price Above Rubies" where he is a murder suspect in the case of a wealthy jewelry store owner. In the season 3 episode "Redacted", Jane hires Culpepper to steal Agent LaRoche's Todd Johnson murder suspect list from LaRoche's home. Although he is caught in the act, Jane and Lisbon secure his release.
- Alicia Witt as Rosalind Harker—Red John's blind sometime companion. Then using the alias Roy Tagliaferro, Red John started a two-month relationship with her when his car allegedly broke down near her home. In the season 1 finale, "Red John's Footsteps", Patrick and Lisbon find her and get a description of Red John. In the second episode of season 4, "Little Red Book", Jane contacts Harker and brings her to a morgue where the body of Timothy Carter was kept. After feeling his face, she confirms Carter is not Red John. In "Red Is the New Black", Roy Tagliaferro pays Rosalind a visit, telling her to tell Patrick and FBI agent Susan Darcy he was going to "clear it all up". When Jane, Lisbon, and Darcy and her FBI S.W.A.T. team arrive at Harker's home, they discover a distraught Rosalind playing the piano saying "Roy couldn't stay". Darcy discovers the corpse of the morgue attendant with whom she had spoken earlier in that episode and confirms her suspicion that Red John is still alive.
- Currie Graham as Walter Mashburn—a mischievous billionaire businessman. He first appears in the Season 2 episode "Redline" as a murder suspect who is later cleared by Jane. In the season 3 episode "Red Hot", Mashburn is saved from a murder attempt and along the way develops a (brief) romance with Lisbon.
- Jack Plotnick as Brett Partridge—a Bureau of Forensic Science lead agent. He has a macabre interest in Red John killings, copycat or the real thing. He and Jane usually cross paths at crime scenes but do not like each other. In the fifth-season finale, he is revealed to be one of the seven final Red John suspects but is killed off in the sixth-season premiere. He was later revealed to have been a member of the Blake Association.
- Shauna Bloom as Rebecca Anderson—an assistant on Sam Bosco's team at CBI and one of Red John's accomplices. Jane discerns she suffered an unhappy childhood and was abused as a youngster, which led her to develop a strong sense of self-loathing. Like most of Red John's operatives, she is a damaged person whom Red John rebuilt and to whom she is unconditionally loyal. In the season 2 episode "His Red Right Hand", Rebecca kills Bosco and two other agents under orders from Red John, so Jane could be given the case back. Anderson tells Jane that there can be no light without darkness. She also, under Red John's orders, under the alias "Agent Rojo" (Spanish for "Red"), stole a corpse (one of Red John's earliest victims), which Red John might have somehow bungled and thus lead to his identification. She was later killed in CBI custody by a quick-acting toxic subcutaneous poison, administered by, as it is later learned, one of Red John's other operatives.
- Henry Ian Cusick as Tommy Volker—a ruthless business tycoon responsible for murdering all the residents of an entire Amazon village, as well as killing his assistant and various other people. Lisbon made it her personal task to arrest Volker, which has so far proven very difficult due to Volker's vast influence with politicians, police, and even judges. CBI Media Relations Brenda Shettrick is revealed to be Volker's source of information from inside the CBI. In midseason 5, Lisbon finally shoots and arrests Volker in a public zoo where he is trying to murder a young boy who witnessed one of his crimes.
- Reed Diamond as Ray Haffner—former FBI and CBI agent, revealed to be a member of "Visualize". He first appeared in season 4, as Jane's temporary boss after Lisbon's suspension after the Timothy Carter/Craig O'Laughlin mess. He refuses to tell Lisbon if he worked at the barn where Red John painted his first smiley face. In the fifth-season finale, he is revealed to be one of the seven final Red John suspects. In the 6th season, he was killed in the explosion at Jane's home in Malibu.
- Morena Baccarin as Erica Flynn—A former worker at a matchmaking service whose husband's murder was the case being investigated in her first appearance, season 3's "Every Rose Has Its Thorn". Throughout the course of the case, Jane was confident it was Erica who murdered her husband and pulled a trick on her that ultimately confirmed previously unprovable evidence that she indeed was the killer. Erica returned in season 4's "War of the Roses" to consult on the murder of one of her friends, but later managed to escape. Erica is often playful and volatile, a sociopath, and an expert actress and seductress. Despite her criminal ways, she and Jane bear a mutual appreciation for each other. Erica's final appearance is in season 7's "Orange Blossom Ice Cream," when she agrees to help the FBI apprehend her boyfriend, a courier for terrorist organizations, in exchange for amnesty for her past crimes. Erica unsuccessfully tries to double-cross Jane but is finally apprehended.
- Robert Picardo as Jason Cooper—a Bret Stiles acolyte and duplicitous high-ranking executive member of Visualize. He appears in four episodes during the 5th season.
