= The Mentalist season 7 =

The Mentalist
- Season 7
- DVD cover
- No. of episodes: 13

Release
- Original network: CBS
- Original release: November 30, 2014 – February 18, 2015

Season chronology
- ← Previous; Season 6

The seventh and final season of the CBS police procedural series The Mentalist, created by Bruno Heller, premiered on November 30, 2014 and concluded with its two-part series finale on February 18, 2015.

== Cast and characters ==
=== Main cast ===
- Simon Baker as Patrick Jane (13 episodes)
- Robin Tunney as Teresa Lisbon (13 episodes)
- Tim Kang as Kimball Cho (13 episodes)
- Rockmond Dunbar as Dennis Abbott (13 episodes)
- Joe Adler as Jason Wylie (13 episodes)
- Josie Loren as Michelle Vega (10 episodes)

=== Recurring cast ===
- Christine Adams as Lena Abbott (3 episodes)
- Tim Griffin as Ken Spackman (2 episodes)
- Garcelle Beauvais as Danitra Cass (2 episodes)
- Dylan Baker as Bill Peterson (2 episodes)
- Aubrey Deeker as Joseph Keller/Lazarus (2 episodes)

=== Notable guest stars ===
- Pedro Pascal as Marcus Pike ("Nothing But Blue Skies")
- Morena Baccarin as Erica Flynn ("Orange Blossom Ice Cream")
- Tangie Ambrose as Samantha Barsocky ("Copper Bullet")
- M. C. Gainey as Pete Barsocky ("Copper Bullet")
- Amanda Righetti as Grace Van Pelt Rigsby ("White Orchids")
- Owain Yeoman as Wayne Rigsby ("White Orchids")
- Derek Phillips as Stan Lisbon (2 episodes)
- Robert Belushi as Jimmy Lisbon (2 episodes)

== Episodes ==
No. overall	No. in season	Title	Directed by	Written by	Original release date	Prod. code	U.S. viewers (millions)
139	1	"Nothing But Blue Skies"	Chris Long	Tom Szentgyörgyi	November 30, 2014	4X5952	10.89
While Jane and Lisbon enjoy their thriving relationship and manage to keep it a secret from their coworkers, the FBI investigates a murder of one of their own. The agent was undercover in a bowling alley believed to be the base of operations for a weapon smuggling ring. Aided in the investigation by agent Ken Spackman (Tim Griffin), Jane deduces that the bowling alley's bartender, Tisch (Karina Logue), is working for the gang, but Tisch manages to escape. With agent Kim Fischer having transferred to Seattle, rookie agent Michelle Vega (Josie Loren) joins the team and helps them capture Tisch, and soon after, Jane formulates a plan to incriminate the murderer. This results in the alley owner being caught, and Jane later pinpoints the location of Tisch's weapons stash, getting her arrested as well. In the FBI headquarters, Jane briefly encounters Agent Pike (Pedro Pascal), who questions what Jane has to offer to Lisbon, shortly before Jane surprises Lisbon by renting an antique car.
140	2	"The Greybar Hotel"	Bill Eagles	Jordan Harper	December 7, 2014	4X5953	8.70
Two car thieves, Marie Flanigan (Brit Morgan) and Cole Foster (Val Lauren) rob a car from a charity gala, which results in the former's capture and the latter's escape to his remote hideaway. As part of a plan to locate Cole's hideout, Jane sends Lisbon undercover as an inmate in the prison where Marie is being held. Meanwhile, the FBI partners with the CIA to track down a larger network Cole is selling to. Jane initiates a breakout, via Abbott intimidating Marie and telling her she will be transferred to an asylum, frightening her and providing her incentive to escape. She and Lisbon successfully make it out and reunite with Cole, who murders a man at a gas station shortly afterwards. Later, a standoff ensues near Cole's helicopter when Lisbon attempts to reach for a gun, but the FBI arrives in time to apprehend the thieves. Cho later tells Jane that they've found links between Cole's superiors and someone Jane knows: Erica Flynn.
141	3	"Orange Blossom Ice Cream"	Chris Long	Tom Szentgyörgyi	December 14, 2014	4X5951	8.37
Jane and Lisbon are sent into Beirut in the FBI's attempt to locate criminal Jan Nemic (Mark Ivanir), the lover of Jane's old adversary Erica Flynn (Morena Baccarin). Nemic has been paid 1.5 million Euros by Jihad groups in the Philippines to smuggle fake passport chips that get terrorists into the country. After meeting with Erica in her hotel, Jane is brought to Nemic and hired by him to memorize 81 numbers and give them to Nemic's Filipino couriers. Jane gives the numbers to the FBI, prompting them to send Cho's team and Vega to Atlanta to meet with Nemic's contact. However, the suspect is killed in a shootout. This forces Jane and Erica to rob the passport codes from Nemic's home, which they narrowly succeed in. This results in the FBI's discovery of the passport chips from an address, as well as Nemic's arrest. Erica, meanwhile, reveals to Jane that she has been planning to steal Nemic's money, and almost escapes before Lisbon cuts her off, and Erica is finally apprehended. Jane later takes Lisbon to a rooftop and the two enjoy ice cream while watching fireworks.
142	4	"Black Market"	Michael Nankin	Tom Donaghy	December 21, 2014	4X5954	8.68
Because Jane is too sick to work, Lisbon has to catch a group of jewel thieves and solve a murder by performing a psychic show on her own. Meanwhile, Abbott discovers that his actions on a previous work posting could cost his wife a promotion in Washington.
143	5	"The Silver Briefcase"	Simon Baker	Jordan Harper	December 28, 2014	4X5955	8.48
The FBI reopens the case regarding the murder of Colonel Aaron Raymond (Wylie M. Pickett)'s wife after Jane becomes suspicious. Raymond's alibi is that his wife drove him to work that day, but Jane suspects that it was another woman who Raymond was likely having an affair with. They suspect a woman named Denise Cortez (Jama Williamson), who Wylie and Vega learn changed into a disguise in the car while discarding her clothes at a homeless encampment. Raymond soon learns about the investigation, forcing Abbott to close the case and reconsider the team's strategy. Jane attempts to force a confession out of the killer after luring Raymond and Denise into a single room, and threatening to open a briefcase which he claims contains incriminating evidence. They both name each other as the killer and share their respective stories of how they witnessed the murder, but Jane is unable to come to a conclusion. The briefcase simply contains a paper that reads "curiosity killed the cat", written by Jane to Vega in response to the same words Vega told Jane earlier.
144	6	"Green Light"	Geary McLeod	Alex Berger	January 7, 2015	4X5956	9.05
A DEA raid goes wrong when no drugs are found. The FBI consults on the case, with the DEA team being led by Abbott's former boss in Rio Bravo, Bill Peterson (Dylan Baker). Jane discovers the existence of a mole within Peterson's team, tipping off the cartel on when to hide the drugs. Peterson attempts to blackmail Abbott into giving him credit for the case's completion, using Abbott's shady past in Rio Bravo as leverage. Abbott confides in Jane that he shot and killed a cartel leader in Rio Bravo in retaliation to the man's crimes, and Peterson is the only other person who knows his secret. Shortly afterwards, one of Peterson's team members is found dead. Jane, knowing the mole killed the agent, arranges a meeting with all of the DEA members within the task force whom Abbot requires to give up their guns which are removed outside where Lisbon starts removing the live bullets. Meanshile Jane and uses his deduction skills to narrow down the suspects to three. Elsewhere, Vega, on instruction from Jane, arrests Peterson and brings him to the meeting, giving the three suspects time to leave, retrieving their guns on their way out. Lisbon, Cho and Abbott separately confront each member as the killer, testing their reactions. Cho's suspect is arrested after firing his gun on him, but the live bullets had been replaced with blanks. Peterson, furious with Abbott for authorizing his humiliation, is talked down by Jane, who has found his own leverage against Peterson. After the case, Jane and Lisbon celebrate Jane's birthday, with Jane's present being his mended teacup, which broke in "The Great Red Dragon". Jane becomes emotional and admits to Lisbon that he's truly surprised and couldn't guess what she bought him.
145	7	"Little Yellow House"	Edward Ornelas	Marisa Wegrzyn	January 14, 2015	4X5957	9.36
The FBI investigates the murder of a high-profile lawyer, who is apparently linked to Lisbon's younger brother Jimmy (Robert Belushi). Surprised, Lisbon brings Jane along to her hometown of Chicago, where they reunite with Lisbon's brother Stan (Derek Phillips) and later find Jimmy near a pond. Jane learns that Jimmy is an avid gambler and under FBI suspicion since he was present in a game with the lawyer. Jane convinces Jimmy to cooperate with the FBI and play a monitored poker game with the other players present, suspecting that one of them is the killer. Wylie and Vega watch the surveillance to figure out each player's "tells". Lisbon pretends to be a psychic and announces that the killer is holding an ace, knowing that every player is holding an ace. The lawyer's friend, Charlie McInnis, scratches his brow (his tell), and Cho confronts him as the killer while Jane tells the head player, a mob boss, that McInnis has been cheating by watching them through the surveillance camera. Cho gives McInnis the choice of surrendering or facing the wrath of the mob boss, with McInnis opting to the former. He says he killed the lawyer under suspicion that the man was having an affair with McInnis' wife, but this later proves untrue. Lisbon and Jane attend a party hosted by Stan for his baby, and Lisbon tells Jane she loves him.
146	8	"The Whites of His Eyes"	Rod Holcomb	Erin Lane Donovan	January 21, 2015	4X5958	9.60
A hitman murders a witness to a brutal murder perpetrated by one Kelvin Bittaker, while the other witness, Lily Stoppard (Alexa PenaVega) is put under FBI protection as she plans to testify against Bittaker. While Agent Spackman (from "Nothing But Blue Skies") returns to get the team's help on the case, the FBI learns that the entire Bittaker family consists of criminals. The mother, Belinda (Mary Kay Place) makes the decisions while the hitman is discovered to have been hired through a video game that one of Belinda's sons plays. They encounter the hitman at a house traced via the player that the son is communicating with, but the hitman escapes. Knowing that Lily is being targeted during her transfer from her hotel to the courtroom, Jane has the FBI strategize against any scenario where the hitman can get the drop on them within the hotel. The hitman enters the hotel and unleashes smoke on every floor, and the team swaps out Lily for Vega, who wears a wig. This successfully fools the hitman, allowing Cho to shoot him. Lisbon, meanwhile, realizes that the directions Jane gave her within the hotel diverted her away from any of the action, and while Jane claims it was for her protection, she calls him out for preventing her from doing her job.
147	9	"Copper Bullet"	Tom Snyder	Tom Donaghy	January 28, 2015	4X5959	9.17
Abbott's former boss in Rio Bravo, Bill Peterson (Dylan Baker) digs up the evidence to convict Abbott of the crime he committed in Rio Bravo by finding the bullet used to kill the mob enforcer. He plans to use it against him during Lena Abbott's (Christine Adams) evaluation for the post of Under Secretary of Commerce also convicting Abbott of the murder. Jane, who has been monitoring Peterson through Wylie, gets a whiff of the plan. The team, consisting of Jane, Lisbon, Wylie, Cho and, later Vega, fight back by seeking evidence of Peterson's corruption and realise that for 20 years he has been skimming drugs and money making up evidence, doing so during the busts he had been leading. Meanwhile Peterson meets with Missy Brammer, the Legislative Director to a congressman, who is going to evaluate Lena for the post and gives her the bullet as evidence. Jane and his team find unlicensed weapons at Peterson's house but cannot access the skimmed loot at Peterson's house because it is in a safe that needs his biometrics to open. Jane instructs Wylie to borrow money from the FBI's evidence locker to plant as if it was Peterson's stash - Wylie has to confide in Abbott to obtain high enough clearance to achieve this; meanwhile Vega delays Peterson as he heads home, long enough for the team to succeed. During the morning of the hearing, in an altercation between Abbott and Peterson, Abbott shows the "evidence" he has against Peterson (photos of the weapons, cash and, to prove the location, his cat). This leads to Peterson trying to make a deal with Abbott: a share of the money in return for the evidence, but Vega secretly records the conversation. Though defeated, Peterson is happy that Lena will never get the Post as the evidence against Abbott has been passed on to the congressman. However, it's revealed that Peterson never met with the real Brammer but with Samantha Barsocky (Tangie Ambrose), a friend of Jane's, who posed as her, thereby acquiring the evidence against Abbott. Peterson is arrested. As Lena has now been confirmed for the post, Abbott will be moving with her to D.C. soon, and he tells Cho he will take over the team.
148	10	"Nothing Gold Can Stay"	Paul A. Kaufman	Alex Berger	February 4, 2015	4X5960	8.97
Three men rob an armored car and the FBI gets the case. Jane suspects that one of the bank employees is working with them, but he won't talk so Wylie tracks his recent locations from his cellphone. Before Vega leaves the office with Cho, to check out the locations that Wylie found, Wylie asks Vega if she wants to go with him to a gaming tournament and dinner in Houston and she says yes. Cho and Vega finds the suspects at a diner and they start shooting. Cho shoots one of them, but he manages to escape. Vega is shot by suspect Steve Sellers (William Gregory Lee) and later dies at the hospital. A detective from Austin Homicide, Brian Portis, joins in on the case after Vega's death. One of the suspects is seen at a drug store, but he flees. The police follow the suspects and find them in a house with two hostages. Jane has a plan but Abbott and Cho decide to go in with SWAT instead; when Jane finds out Lisbon is going in with them, he enters the house himself. He gets both hostages released and then gets two of the men to turn on each other. They are about to start shooting each other, but Cho and Abbott go inside and kill them both. After Vega's funeral, Jane tells Lisbon he can't keep working for the FBI, that it could have been her instead of Vega and that he couldn't take it if anything were to happen to Lisbon. Jane then says he's leaving for "someplace nice," and tells Lisbon she can join him if she wants to. Lisbon tearfully watches Jane walk away.
149	11	"Byzantium"	Nina Lopez-Corrado	Jordan Harper & Marisa Wegrzyn	February 11, 2015	4X5961	9.10
After a double homicide, a "psychic" offers to assist the FBI and he leads them to five other buried bodies. But soon the team suspects him to be involved in the murders himself, so they track down Jane to help find out the truth. Wylie decides to make his first field trip with Cho, but gets attacked from behind and does not see the attacker. Jane decides to hypnotize Wylie to find out who attacked him. Meanwhile, the "psychic" is killed.
150	12	"Brown Shag Carpet"	Geary McLeod	Tom Szentgyörgyi	February 18, 2015	4X5962	10.10
Continuing their investigation into the serial killer introduced in the previous episode, the team convinces a reluctant Jane to appear as a guest on a number of television and radio broadcasts as a renowned psychic. During one radio show, he's contacted by a mysterious man identifying himself as "Lazarus" who cryptically discusses information on the case. The FBI realizes that Lazarus is indeed their killer, but find nothing but a rigged landline at the triangulated coordinates. Jane and another FBI agent are rammed by a car outside the radio station, with Jane being abducted by Lazarus. The killer, whose name is Joe Keller Jr., attempts to use Jane to communicate with the spirit of his serial-killer father and reconcile with his violent instincts. While Keller periodically leaves the house Jane is being kept in, Jane uses his resources to uncuff himself and set up a trap for Keller. This results in Keller being lured into a storage room, where Jane triggers an explosion using a lightbulb and a piece of chewing gum. Lisbon arrives at the house right as it explodes, but is able to rescue Jane from the wreckage.
151	13	"White Orchids"	Chris Long	Bruno Heller & Tom Szentgyörgyi & Jordan Harper	February 18, 2015	4X5963	10.10
Picking up 24 hours after "Brown Shag Carpet", Jane proposes to Lisbon, which she accepts. The team is overjoyed by the news and Abbott offers a home he owns as the wedding grounds. Elsewhere, Joe Keller, AKA Lazarus, is revealed to have survived the explosion, and goes on a violent rampage in search of Jane. Lisbon and Jane eventually give in to allowing numerous guests at their wedding, but Lisbon becomes upset at how overly lavish the ceremony has become; Jane decides to hold the wedding at the private lakeside home he plans to refurbish. Keller locates the home and walks through the open door, where he's apprehended by a large team of FBI agents anticipating his arrival, including the pistol-packing bride. Jane and Lisbon are happily married, with the ceremony's guests including Lisbon's brothers, as well as Van Pelt and Rigsby. The rest of the attendees party that night while Jane and Lisbon look on, with the latter announcing her pregnancy. Jane is surprised but, delighted, embraces her.
