= Teresa Lisbon =

- The Mentalist character
- Robin Tunney as Teresa Lisbon
- First appearance: "Pilot"
- Last appearance: "White Orchids"
- Created by: Bruno Heller
- Portrayed by: Robin Tunney

In-universe information
- Nicknames: Boss, Jefa, Reese, Saint Teresa
- Gender: Female
- Title(s): Special Agent (FBI); Special Agent/Senior Agent/Senior Agent in Charge (CBI)
- Occupation: FBI Special Agent
- Spouse: Patrick Jane (m. 2017)
- Children: Unborn child (with Patrick Jane)
- Nationality: American

Teresa Lisbon is a fictional character on the CBS crime drama The Mentalist, portrayed by Robin Tunney. Lisbon is a former senior agent and leader of the "Serious Crimes Unit" for the California Bureau of Investigation (CBI). After leaving the CBI, she served as a sheriff for a small town in Washington state, but left that position to join the Federal Bureau of Investigation (FBI).

== Character background ==
In the episode "Red Badge", it is revealed, whilst talking with her psychiatrist, that Lisbon's mother was killed by a drunk driver when she was twelve, and later in the same episode it is mentioned that Lisbon was formerly an inspector (detective) for the San Francisco Police Department (SFPD), and at the time worked for then-SFPD Lieutenant Sam Bosco. She also accidentally admits that after her mother's death, her father was sometimes abusive towards her and her three younger brothers, and that he would suffer blackouts from his alcoholism. Her father eventually committed suicide. In the episode "Red Tide", it was implied that the young Teresa had to take over the maternal role and care for the family after her mother's death.

In the episode "Code Red", it is revealed one of Lisbon's brothers is named Tommy, and in the episode "Red Hot", it is revealed that another brother is named James. In the same episode, her mother is said to have been a nurse and her father a fireman. In the episode "Ring Around the Rosie", she states she was raised in Chicago.

In the episode "Where in the World Is Carmine O'Brien" her brother Tommy is introduced, who apparently has gone through a succession of unsuccessful jobs and has become a bounty hunter, allowing his daughter Annabeth ("Annie") to tag along. The sibling relationship seems loving but strained, with Lisbon acting as almost a surrogate mother figure.

In the episode "So Long, and Thanks for All the Red Snapper" Lisbon is briefly reacquainted with a former fiancé.

In the episode "The Desert Rose", Lisbon is captured by Red John.

In episode “Little Yellow House” (season 7) it is revealed that Lisbon’s 3rd brother is named Stanley and Lisbon is the oldest. It is also revealed while Lisbon and Jane are looking for her brother James, that Stanley was renovating the old family home in Chicago so he could move in with his family.

Her name was taken from the character of Therese Lisbon from The Virgin Suicides.

== Relationships ==
Lisbon and the CBI's consultant Patrick Jane have a very intense working relationship which has, over the course of the show's seasons, developed into a personal relationship as well. Lisbon also had a close and platonic relationship with the late Samuel Bosco, who was eventually revealed to have unrequited feelings of love for her. In season 2, the millionaire Walter Mashburn persistently makes passes at Lisbon, though he is rebuffed. Later, in season 3, Mashburn reappears, and at the end of the episode it is revealed that Lisbon liked Mashburn. Mashburn, who then leaves for Europe, has not reappeared in the series altogether. In the season 6 finale of The Mentalist ("Blue Bird"), Jane openly admits his love towards Lisbon and at the end of the episode, they finally kiss.

Lisbon is well-liked by the rest of her team: Grace Van Pelt, Wayne Rigsby, and Kimball Cho, portrayed by Amanda Righetti, Owain Yeoman and Tim Kang. Her old boss Virgil Minelli also had a friendly relationship with her, and appeared to tolerate her occasional inability to rein in Jane's unorthodox behavior. In the season 2 episode "The Red Box", Madeleine Hightower joins the CBI, replacing Minelli as Chief of the CBI. Lisbon's relationship with Hightower is much more adversarial than with Minelli. Hightower makes Lisbon responsible for Jane's behavior, threatening to sanction Lisbon for Jane's missteps. The threat that Hightower made becomes reality for Lisbon in the episode "Blood Money", when Hightower suspends Lisbon for five days for not controlling Jane and his behavior, despite Jane's effort to stop this.

=== Patrick Jane ===
Lisbon tolerates Jane's misbehavior, although she is often antagonized by his actions and has to apologize for him to both her CBI superiors and others with whom Jane interacts in his capacity as a consultant to the CBI. She sometimes risks her career by supporting Jane. The two often engage in light flirting and teasing, with Lisbon sometimes being visibly affected by Jane's charm. She and Jane have shared several personal and deep moments throughout the series, however, which can be interpreted either as romantic interest, or just in the context of being best friends. She is shown giving Jane multiple chances and is often seen, even when she is unhappy with his behavior, to be supportive of him and help him. Jane certainly respects Lisbon more than others, often making sure she is not held responsible for his antics.

Bruno Heller, the creator of The Mentalist, has said:

Some people see that as a very sort of intense but cryptic romantic relationship. Other people see it purely as brother and sister. And I think we leave it to time and the audience to play that out and the chemistry of the actors.

In the season 6 finale, Blue Bird, Jane hops over a fence at the airport and storms onto Lisbon's DC-bound plane to confess his love for her. Later, Jane and Lisbon confess their love for each other as Jane is being held at airport security for his plane stunt. Patrick Jane leans in to kiss Lisbon when asked to "Say it again". The episode ends with the two of them kissing passionately as the screen fades to black.

In the season 7 premiere, Nothing But Blue Skies, Jane starts a romantic relationship with Lisbon. However, at the request of Lisbon, their love affair is kept secret from their team. It is assumed that the two weeks each had off from the FBI after the events of Blue Bird were spent together, in what Heller described as a 'honeymoon' phase.

In the series finale, White Orchids, Jane surprises Lisbon by proposing to her. Lisbon accepts his proposal. In front of their family, friends, and co-workers, the two get married on the property Jane bought to build their home. Lisbon reveals that she is pregnant at the end of the episode.

== Personality ==
Lisbon is smart, witty, sarcastic, no-nonsense, sometimes impatient, and occasionally playful and mischievous, particularly if Jane is involved. She is also courageous, willing to put herself in danger, and is willing to keep an open mind, but can often be abrasive. She finds herself bending rules, often for the sake of Jane, and, although their relationship is mostly professional, Jane and Lisbon connect in a strange way. She is shown to be a devout Catholic in the first part of "Strawberries and Cream", reciting the Hail Mary while wearing a bomb vest. Also, during the episode "The Crimson Hat", she goes to a Catholic church to pray. She has been shown to be driven, highlighted by her pursuit of Tommy Volker.

Heller has said of Lisbon's character: "[She] is often underestimated [but] essential to balance the series. She embodies the normality, she is down-to-earth. She is nice, while having her flaws. She is torn between her role of boss, who has to straighten out Jane's behavior, and her admiration, her affection, even her love for him."
