= The Mentalist season 6 =

The Mentalist
- Season 6
- DVD cover
- No. of episodes: 22

Release
- Original network: CBS
- Original release: September 29, 2013 – May 18, 2014

Season chronology
- ← Previous; Season 5 Next → Season 7

The sixth season of the CBS police procedural series The Mentalist, created by Bruno Heller, premiered on September 29, 2013 and concluded on May 18, 2014. The season features the endgame of Patrick Jane's long feud with his archnemesis, the serial killer Red John. Afterwards, Dennis Abbott of the Federal Bureau of Investigation (FBI) steps in to shut down the California Bureau of Investigation (CBI), (Note: The fictional CBI is disbanded, not the real CBI – which continues to exist.) found to be riddled with personnel who had been secretly working for Red John. Jane continues his independent consultant job, this time with Abbott's Austin-based special assignment (Note: Abbott's "special assignment" FBI team takes on cases across the United States, which would normally be handled by local FBI field offices in real life.) FBI team, alongside his former CBI colleagues – now FBI Special Agents – Teresa Lisbon and Kimball Cho.

== Cast and characters ==
=== Main cast ===
- Simon Baker as Patrick Jane (22 episodes)
- Robin Tunney as Teresa Lisbon (22 episodes)
- Tim Kang as Kimball Cho (22 episodes)
- Owain Yeoman as Wayne Rigsby (13 episodes)
- Amanda Righetti as Grace Van Pelt (13 episodes)
- Rockmond Dunbar as Dennis Abbott (16 episodes)
- Emily Swallow as FBI Special Agent Kim Fischer (14 episodes)

=== Recurring cast ===
- Michael Gaston as Gale Bertram (5 episodes)
- Drew Powell as FBI Special Agent Reede Smith (4 episodes)
- Reed Diamond as Ray Haffner (3 episodes)
- Titus Welliver as Michael Ridley (2 episodes)
- Xander Berkeley as Sheriff Thomas McAllister (4 episodes)
- William Mapother as Richard Haibach (3 episodes)
- Joe Adler as FBI IT Analyst Jason Wiley (13 episodes)
- Pedro Pascal as FBI Special Agent Marcus Pike (6 episodes)

=== Notable guest stars ===
- Malcolm McDowell as Bret Stiles ("Fire and Brimstone")
- Pruitt Taylor Vince as J.J. LaRoche ("Black Helicopters")
- Aunjanue Ellis as Madeleine Hightower ("Red Listed")
- Jack Plotnick as Brett Partridge ("The Desert Rose")
- Kevin Corrigan as Bob Kirkland ("Red Listed")
- Emmanuelle Chriqui as Lorelei Martins ("The Desert Rose", flashback episode)

== Production ==
CBS announced that it had renewed The Mentalist for a sixth season on March 27, 2013. It was revealed in July 2013 that the mystery of Red John would be revealed before the end of 2013.

On August 7, 2013, it was announced that characters Wayne Rigsby and Grace Van Pelt, played by Owain Yeoman and Amanda Righetti, both of whom had been on the series since the first episode, would be leaving. Emily Swallow and Rockmond Dunbar were cast as Kim Fischer and Dennis Abbott, two recurring characters with the potential to become series regulars. Dunbar was promoted to series regular on October 18, 2013, three weeks before his first episode had been broadcast. On November 15, Swallow was likewise promoted to series regular before her first appearance was aired.

Righetti and Yeoman's final episode, "White as the Driven Snow", aired on March 23, 2014.

=== Filming locations ===
The first episode of the season "The Desert Rose" was filmed in Bombay Beach, California. The production team created a sign for the fictional "Borrego Gas Diner" to stand-in for the local bar and restaurant Ski Inn.

== Home release ==
All 22 episodes were included on the five disc complete sixth season set. It was released on September 20, 2014 in Region 1, October 20, 2014 in Region 2, and October 8, 2014 in Region 4. It included the featurette "Patrick Jane: Redeemed, Recovered, Restored" and unaired scenes.

== Episodes ==
No. overall	No. in season	Title	Directed by	Written by	Original release date	Prod. code	U.S. viewers (millions)
117	1	"The Desert Rose"	Chris Long	Bruno Heller	September 29, 2013	4X5601	9.70
Jane and Lisbon try to narrow down the list of the Red John suspects while the team investigates the death of a man who was missing for two years. An anonymous phone call leads Lisbon into Red John's trap where she discovers a gravely injured Partridge. Before he dies, he says "Tyger, Tyger." Red John calls Jane from Lisbon's phone, implying to him that he has her. Jane's list of suspects drops to six.
118	2	"Black-Winged Redbird"	Robert Duncan McNeill	Tom Szentgyörgyi	October 6, 2013	4X5602	8.55
Jane rushes to the crime scene to find Lisbon dazed, with Red John's classic smiley face on her face, but still alive. Later Jane discovers several clues to Red John's identity after Red John murders Jane's ex-psychiatrist Sophie Miller.
119	3	"Wedding in Red"	Randy Zisk	Daniel Cerone	October 13, 2013	4X5603	9.38
In order to focus on Sheriff McAllister, Jane involves the CBI in a case in Napa. Meanwhile Rigsby and Van Pelt decide to get married.
120	4	"Red Listed"	Eric Laneuville	Rebecca Perry Cutter	October 20, 2013	4X5604	7.75
When a list of fake Red John suspects is stolen, the innocent men named on it find themselves in danger. Madeleine Hightower and Bob Kirkland return. The existence of a conspiracy using the identification phrase "Tyger, Tyger" amongst California's Law Enforcement personnel is revealed. This suggests that Red John, known for his fascination with Blake's poem, may have strong connections to this organization. Bob Kirkland is murdered by Reede Smith, who tells a police officer to say that he killed him because he tried to run away, and they seal the deal by saying "Tyger, Tyger" (which indicates that they are part of the secret organization). Jane's list of suspects drops to five.
121	5	"The Red Tattoo"	Tawnia McKiernan	Eoghan Mahony	October 27, 2013	4X5605	8.82
The CBI team is dispatched to investigate the murder of a member of Visualize. Jason Cooper and Ray Haffner arrive at the crime scene and Cooper tells Lisbon that Haffner is invited by the lieutenant governor to join the case—much to Lisbon's and Jane's dismay. The case seems to lead to the killer being in two places at the same time. Meanwhile, Cho meets a woman at the victim's gym while canvassing. The woman is caught placing a bug in Cho's desk at the CBI by Jane and is questioned. She turns out to be a private investigator (PI) hired to keep an eye on the investigation. At the end of the case, Jane confronts Cooper about hiring the PI to bug the CBI, but Cooper denies the accusation. Jane realizes that Red John hired the PI, meaning that the woman may be in danger. They track her location using her own bug (which Jane planted on her as she left them) and when they arrive at her home, she is fatally wounded. Jane asks her who attacked her and, dying, she tells him that her attacker (Red John, presumably) had a tattoo of three dots on his left shoulder.
122	6	"Fire and Brimstone"	John F. Showalter	Ken Woodruff	November 10, 2013	4X5606	8.46
With the new clue in mind, Jane arranges to gather the remaining Red John suspects – Sheriff Thomas McAllister, Reede Smith, Gale Bertram, Ray Haffner, and Bret Stiles – in one place in hopes of uncovering the serial killer's true identity. Using the information Kira Tinsley gave him before she died, Jane, brandishing a shotgun, makes the five suspects show him their left shoulders revealing that McAllister, Smith and Bertram all have three dots tattooed on the left shoulder—meaning that one of those three is Red John. Lisbon (whom Jane abandons at beachside while en route to the rendezvous with the suspects at his family home) requisitions a car to arrive at Jane's house, and just as she is about to enter, an explosion occurs, throwing her back.
123	7	"The Great Red Dragon"	Elodie Keene	Jordan Harper	November 17, 2013	4X5608	9.72
After the explosion, DNA evidence suggests the burnt bodies were those of Haffner, Stiles and McAllister. Bertram and Smith go on the run, but Smith turns himself in not much later, after managing to escape a series of assassination attempts, realizing his life is in permanent danger. Jane announces to the media that Red John is Gale Bertram. A bartender recognizes Bertram, who stopped in for a drink, on the television. Bertram bludgeons the bartender to death, then flees. The CBI is disbanded and shut down by the FBI, led by Agent Dennis Abbott (Rockmond Dunbar), due to the corruption and entanglements which have caused a massive scandal within California law enforcement.
124	8	"Red John"	Chris Long	Bruno Heller	November 24, 2013	4X5607	10.94
In the conclusion to the Red John saga, Jane, now considered a fugitive by the FBI, goes on the run, in the meantime arranging a meeting with Gale Bertram, who is now publicly believed to be Red John. Meeting with Bertram in the chapel of the cemetery where Jane's wife and daughter are interred, a Red John operative (Oscar Cordero) shoots Bertram dead. Sheriff McAllister steps out, revealing he is alive (after events in Fire and Brimstone) and is Red John. Jane deduces that McAllister had knocked the group out with a concussion bomb to allow him to drag Jane, Bertram and Smith to safety, then exploded a second, lethal bomb, to kill Stiles and Haffner, also leaving behind a corpse that matched McAllister so authorities would think he was dead. Jane distracts McAllister with breadcrumbs and a pigeon, causing McAllister to drop his gun, whereby Jane retrieves a gun he had taped under a pew, and shoots him. After Cordero runs in Jane shoots him dead, but is then attacked with a knife by a woman who is presumably a Red John acolyte, thereby allowing Red John to escape. Jane manages to take the offensive, overpowering the woman and catching McAllister in a nearby park. McAllister begs for his life, even promising to answer questions he knows Jane cannot answer, such as how he knew the seven names on Jane's shortlist. Jane, however, goes through with his revenge and chokes Red John to death, then leaves a message for Lisbon telling her that Red John is dead and it's all over.
125	9	"My Blue Heaven"	Simon Baker	Tom Szentgyörgyi	December 1, 2013	4X5609	9.58
Two years have passed since the events of 'Red John' (the discovery that McAllister was Red John, and Jane's killing him), and Jane — who's been living on an island off the coast of Venezuela — receives a job offer; all criminal charges against him will be dropped if he agrees to work as a consultant for the FBI. Patrick eventually decides to accept (in part due to a woman he meets on the island named Kim), but on his own terms, which include working with Lisbon (now a small-town police chief in Washington State). Jane writes down a 4-point agreement on a napkin, of which he makes several photocopies, having Abbott sign the copies to indicate agreement with Jane's terms. However, once Jane is back in the United States, Abbott informs him that the 4-point agreement has no legal weight and that his signature on the copies means only that he acknowledged reading what Jane wrote on the napkin. Abbott says that either Jane will work for the Bureau on the Bureau's terms or he will face charges. When Jane refuses to agree to the Bureau's terms, Abbott (also revealing Kim to be an FBI agent) has Jane taken away to a "detention suite".
126	10	"Green Thumb"	Robert Duncan McNeill	Daniel Cerone	December 8, 2013	4X5610	9.97
Three months since "My Blue Heaven", Jane continues to remain in his detention suite, insisting on Lisbon's team membership in the FBI in order to work as their consultant. Lisbon reluctantly assists in a case involving a missing computer programmer in Brooklyn, New York, who is married to a gypsy named Defiance, whom Jane attempts to empathize with. Jane escapes from the FBI's watch so as to rile them and to mock up a list with redactions then spray-paints the road to indicate his location; his location is found with the help of young FBI analyst Jason Wylie (Joe Adler). Jane deduces that, after the programmer murdered a proposed psychic whom he (falsely) suspected of having an affair with Defiance, he was kidnapped. Following the discovery of the psychic's dismembered body in the house garden, and the programmer's subsequent rescue from a member of an old New York street gang living in the victim's apartment, Jane blackmails Abbott with his list - a list of Blake Association members still at large. As the FBI reneged on one contract he thought they had agreed to, Jane agrees only to work with the FBI on his terms and later will provide the names. Lisbon later decides to join the FBI.
127	11	"White Lines"	Guy Ferland	Ken Woodruff	January 5, 2014	4X5611	10.22
Jane, Lisbon and the FBI team investigate the death of several DEA agents, and Jane goes on a date with a beautiful woman (Brianna Brown) associated with the case. There's a drug war going on between different clans and the police, and Jane is able to confirm his suspicion that the beautiful woman is the drug trafficker.
128	12	"The Golden Hammer"	James Hayman	Michael Weiss	January 12, 2014	4X5612	9.58
A high-tech cartographer who may have uncovered a spy ring is murdered. Jane finds that national security details were sold by the CEOs secretary and that she murdered the man. Meanwhile, Lisbon is contacted by old colleague, Osvaldo Ardiles (David Norona), who thinks he has been bugged. She refers him to Van Pelt and Rigsby, who now run a digital security business. They wind up on the trail of an alarming conspiracy - 12 former members of the CBI have been bugged, including themselves, Jane, Lisbon, Cho, and Ardiles. Rigsby finds Ardiles murdered.
129	13	"Black Helicopters"	Randy Zisk	Erika Green Swafford	March 9, 2014	4X5613	9.95
The FBI team tries to track down the killer of a United States Attorney. Jane goes undercover in a homestead commune. Meanwhile, Lisbon asks for LaRoche's help on the case of the 12 former CBI agents who have been wire-taped, one of whom (Ardiles) has already been murdered. Rigsby joins LaRoche in searching a darkened warehouse for a suspect, where LaRoche receives a fatal gunshot wound from a booby trap.
130	14	"Grey Water"	Geary McLeod	David Appelbaum	March 16, 2014	4X5614	8.65
The case of the 12 former CBI agents who have been wire-taped escalates further, with Rigsby and Van Pelt (and their baby) attacked in their home – barely making it out alive. The pair are enlisted to the FBI team, which focuses on a list of potential suspects compiled from previous CBI case logs that involved the threatened CBI agents. Meanwhile, Jane and Fischer investigate a case at an oil fracking site, where a local farmer who sued them for environmental damage is found murdered. Although the oil company is the main suspect, Jane manages to get the real murderer to reveal himself: the farmer's best friend, who killed him to keep the money he stole when they broke in to the company's headquarters for proof of bribery. The team has eliminated all suspects in the CBI threat – though maintaining some uncertainty about suspect Richard Haibach (from "Blinking Red Light"). While Rigsby is spending a short night out with Jane and Cho, a dark figure sneaks into Grace's motel room.
131	15	"White as the Driven Snow"	Chris Long	Eoghan Mahony	March 23, 2014	4X5615	8.02
After Grace is abducted, the FBI team tries to find her but their main suspect, Haibach, has an alibi and a very protective lawyer. Wayne and Patrick come up with an alternative plan. They trick Haibach into leading them to where he's keeping Grace – with his sister at her mountain cabin. However, Rigsby is shot twice when the sister uses Grace as a trap. Haibach then takes Patrick and Grace outside and prepares to chop off Patrick's fingers, but Rigsby somehow manages to overpower the sister, saving Patrick by shooting Haibach. The other members of the team locate the cabin and arrive in time to take Rigsby to the hospital. With Rigsby recovering in a hospital, he and Grace are offered positions on the FBI team, but they decline – saying that they prefer civilian life.
132	16	"Violets"	J. Miller Tobin	Jordan Harper	March 30, 2014	4X5616	8.72
Investigating the murder of an art gallery owner during a robbery, the FBI consults their art division, led by Agent Marcus Pike (Pedro Pascal). Jane formulates an elaborate plan in which the team plays different roles connecting to that of Jane, who poses as a wealthy art robber partnering with his girlfriend, played by Lisbon. Successfully deceiving the robbers and their leader, Edwin McKaye (Charles Mesure), Jane lures them into a trap designed to initiate a robbery at his temporary home and catch the criminals in the act, as well as fooling McKaye into going on the run and believing he is safe, prompting him to visit his hideout storing the stolen art, and thus get him caught, as well as incriminated for the murder of the gallery owner. Following the completion of the case, Lisbon goes on a date with Pike.
133	17	"Silver Wings of Time"	James Hayman	Tom Szentgyörgyi & Rebecca Perry Cutter	April 13, 2014	4X5617	9.02
Jane, Abbott, Wylie, and the rest of the team must find the real killer for an old crime, while the convicted innocent is living his final days and hours before his execution on death row.
134	18	"Forest Green"	Eric Laneuville	Jeffrey Hatcher	April 20, 2014	4X5618	8.65
When a woman is found murdered near a remote men's social club, Jane must find a way to insinuate himself into the insular group to find the killer. Abbot is offered a bribe, and Marcus Pike has important news for Lisbon.
135	19	"Brown Eyed Girls"	Sylvain White	Eoghan Mahony & Michael Weiss	April 27, 2014	4X5619	8.63
Jane comes across a man tending to an injured woman who dies shortly. Tracking a lead, the FBI uncover a woman trafficking gang. The story arc continues in the next episode.
136	20	"Il Tavolo Bianco"	Tom Snyder	Daniel Cerone & Erika Green Swafford	May 4, 2014	4X5620	8.42
Patrick is apparently arrested for the murder of Red John; this is actually all part of a sting operation to determine which member of an empaneled grand jury was paid off to prevent the indictment of a gangster for murder. Jane believes that the prosecuting attorney is the one who was bribed to "throw" the hearing, and he and the FBI set out to prove it. Meanwhile, it's discovered that the human traffickers (from the previous episode) are harvesting organs from the women they've kidnapped.
137	21	"Black Hearts"	Randy Zisk	Ken Woodruff & David Appelbaum	May 11, 2014	4X5621	8.64
The head of a kidnapping ring is sought by Jane and Lisbon as the victims begin to run out of time. Meanwhile, Lisbon makes her decision about whether to move to Washington, D.C., with Agent Pike.
138	22	"Blue Bird"	Chris Long	Bruno Heller	May 18, 2014	4X5622	9.69
To stop Lisbon from leaving, Jane arranges for a cold-case to be re-opened. Lisbon is furious when she realizes the deception and storms off to catch her flight to Washington. But Jane follows her and confesses his love for her. Meanwhile, this also causes the real killers to be caught.

== U.S. ratings ==
No.	Title	Original U.S. air date	Viewers (in millions)	Rating/Share (Adults 18–49)	Rank (per week)
1	"The Desert Rose"	September 29, 2013	9.70	1.6/4	#22
2	"Black-Winged Red Bird"	October 6, 2013	8.55	1.5/5	N/A
3	"Wedding in Red"	October 13, 2013	9.38	1.3/3	#20
4	"Red Listed"	October 20, 2013	7.75	1.2/3	N/A
5	"The Red Tattoo"	October 27, 2013	8.82	1.3/3	N/A
6	"Fire and Brimstone"	November 10, 2013	8.46	1.4/5	N/A
7	"The Great Red Dragon"	November 17, 2013	9.72	1.4/4	#21
8	"Red John"	November 24, 2013	10.94	1.6/4	#16
9	"My Blue Heaven"	December 1, 2013	9.58	1.7/4	#19
10	"Green Thumb"	December 8, 2013	9.97	1.8/5	#13
11	"White Lines"	January 5, 2014	10.22	1.6/4	#6
12	"The Golden Hammer"	January 12, 2014	9.58	1.8/5	#14
13	"Black Helicopters"	March 9, 2014	9.95	1.6/4	#16
14	"Grey Water"	March 16, 2014	8.65	1.3/4	#24
15	"White as the Driven Snow"	March 23, 2014	8.02	1.3/3	#22
16	"Violets"	March 30, 2014	8.72	1.5/4	#18
17	"Silver Wings of Time"	April 13, 2014	9.02	1.6/5	#19
18	"Forest Green"	April 20, 2014	8.65	1.4/4	#13
19	"Brown Eyed Girls"	April 27, 2014	8.63	1.2/3	#18
20	"Il Tavolo Bianco"	May 4, 2014	8.42	1.2/4	#21
21	"Black Hearts"	May 11, 2014	8.64	1.2/4	#17
22	"Blue Bird"	May 18, 2014	9.69	1.5/4	#15
