= The Mentalist season 2 =

The Mentalist
- Season 2
- DVD cover
- No. of episodes: 23

Release
- Original network: CBS
- Original release: September 24, 2009 – May 20, 2010

Season chronology
- ← Previous; Season 1 Next → Season 3

The second season of The Mentalist premiered on September 24, 2009, and concluded in May 2010. It consists of 23 episodes. CBS moved the show from Tuesdays at 9:00 pm to Thursdays at 10:00 pm. The series was renewed for a second season in May 2009 by CBS. The second season of The Mentalist premiered in the United Kingdom on FIVE on Friday, February 19, 2010 at 9:00 pm And California Bureau of Investigation (CBI), solving complex homicides alongside Teresa Lisbon's team while actively pursuing leads on Red John. His obsession escalates as Red John tightens his grip, manipulating investigations and directly targeting Jane's colleagues and associates..

== Cast and characters ==
=== Main cast ===
- Simon Baker as Patrick Jane (23 episodes)
- Robin Tunney as Teresa Lisbon (23 episodes)
- Tim Kang as Kimball Cho (23 episodes)
- Owain Yeoman as Wayne Rigsby (23 episodes)
- Amanda Righetti as Grace Van Pelt (23 episodes)

=== Recurring cast ===
- Gregory Itzin as Virgil Minelli (6 episodes; 1–3, 6–8)
- Terry Kinney as Sam Bosco (6 episodes; 1–3, 6–8)
- Aunjanue Ellis as Madeleine Hightower (6 episodes; 17–20, 22–23)
- Shauna Bloom as Rebecca Anderson (3 episodes; 2, 7–8)
- JoNell Kennedy as Coroner Pat (3 episodes; 6, 8–9)
- Leslie Hope as Kristina Frye (2 episodes; 22–23)

=== Notable guest cast ===
- Currie Graham as Walter Mashburn ("Redline")
- Nick Searcy as Sheriff Andy Burnside ("Red Letter")
- John Kapelos as Hank Draber ("Blood Money")
- Raphael Sbarge as Hollis Dunninger ("Redemption")
- Paul Michael Glaser as Walter Crew ("The Scarlet Letter")
- Mark Pellegrino as Von McBride ("Red Menace")
- Frances Fisher as Victoria Abner ("Red Scare")
- Ron Canada as Philip Raimey ("Red Scare")
- Eric Ladin as Roddy Gerber ("Black Gold and Red Blood")
- Meredith Monroe as Verona Westlake ("Red Bulls")
- Kevin Sussman as Phil Redmond ("Rose-Colored Glasses")
- Gregory Sporleder as Terence Badali ("Rose-Colored Glasses")
- Jack Plotnick as Brett Partridge ("Red Sky in the Morning")
- Malcolm McDowell as Bret Stiles ("Red All Over")
- Rebecca Wisocky as Brenda Shettrick ("Bleeding Heart")
- Sharon Lawrence as Melba Walker Shannon ("Bleeding Heart")
- Kevin Alejandro as Victor Bandino ("The Red Box")
- George Newbern as Cliff Edmunds ("Code Red")
- Evan Peters as Oliver McDaniel ("18-5-4")
- Melissa Fumero as Carmen Reyes (“Red Letter”)

== Episodes ==
No. overall	No. in season	Title	Directed by	Written by	Original release date	Prod. code	U.S. viewers (millions)
24	1	"Redemption"	Chris Long	Bruno Heller	September 24, 2009	3X5351	15.07
Minelli decides to assign the Red John case to Agent Sam Bosco, believing that Teresa Lisbon and Patrick Jane are too close to the case. Jane therefore decides to solve "one more case", then leave the CBI. They investigate the murder of a woman who is found suffocated after being accused of stealing a million dollars from her employer. But the team's suspicions are aroused because she was living in poverty, and estranged from her family including a son who has recovered after receiving expensive cancer treatment for free, and a daughter who mysteriously started to pay household bills in cash. Jane agrees to stay on with the CBI.
25	2	"The Scarlet Letter"	Charles Beeson	Tom Szentgyörgyi	October 1, 2009	3X5352	15.75
The CBI team are called in to investigate the murder of Kristin Marley, a prominent state senator's intern and aide, who was rumored to have had an affair with the senator's husband. Lisbon is late to her psychiatrist for the third time in a row and tries to convince him she's alright. Meanwhile, Jane, who is keeping an eye on Sam Bosco and his team, attempts to figure out what new information Bosco has discovered on the Red John case, all the while boasting that he can find the murderer in the CBI's current case within 24 hours. Jane plants a listening device in Bosco's office.
26	3	"Red Badge"	Eric Laneuville	Ashley Gable	October 8, 2009	3X5353	14.70
Lisbon is still attending counselling sessions after five weeks and is upset that the psychiatrist, Dr Carmen, won't sign her off yet. The CBI receives an anonymous tip about a murder, and the team finds the dead body of a criminal from Lisbon's past – a child molester named William Mcteer whom Lisbon had arrested years ago while partnered with Sam Bosco. Lisbon is quickly named the prime suspect after her fingerprints are found on the murder weapon and she is unable to recall the night of the murder. When a lie detector test is performed, it is shown she has strong feelings of deception, and Minelli suspends her from duty just as she is about to enter court to testify against Milton Howard. She then becomes severely depressed because she cannot understand why she does not remember what happened that night. Patrick attempts to hypnotize her to help her remember, and soon realizes the reason she cannot recall any details of that night is because she has been drugged. Jane and Lisbon then put on a show in the office that makes Lisbon seem crazy. Minelli asks Dr Carmen to visit Lisbon at her home, concerned about her mental state. Whilst trying to calm Lisbon, Dr Carmen walks her through Mcteer's crime scene and accidentally reveals that he saw things only the murderer would have seen. Jane explains that Dr Carmen was paid to murder Mcteer by Milton Howard, to prevent Lisbon from testifying against him and for revenge by way of ruining her career; Dr Carmen had been gradually drugging Lisbon in her coffee at the psychiatry sessions, with extra drugs on the Tuesday so that she would not remember anything that evening.
27	4	"Red Menace"	Norberto Barba	Leonard Dick	October 15, 2009	3X5354	15.08
The CBI team investigates the roadside murder of a lawyer, Gordon Hodge, whose only client is one of California's most powerful and notorious motorcycle gangs, the Sinner Saints. Gordon was not an upstanding citizen: he was caught carrying drugs and had had an affair with Constance, the gang leader Von McBride's girlfriend. The team discovers suspects aplenty: Von McBride, Constance, Gordon's wife who knew of the affair, Gordon's son who hated his father, and Felicia Guthrie who seeks revenge as McBride had killed her brother but Gordon had got him acquitted.
28	5	"Red Scare"	Lesli Linka Glatter	Ken Woodruff	October 29, 2009	3X5355	15.53
The CBI team is called to investigate the death of the wealthy new owner of the old Beckworth Mansion, which is the site where his murdered body was found. The victim and his wife bought the mansion with the hope of fixing it up, and the sentimental former owner developed a grudge. The local deputy sheriff, and other witnesses, believe that Walter Beckworth's ghost haunts the mansion and killed the new owner, so the investigation is accompanied by a discussion about the existence of ghosts. Jane discovers that the ghost was actually an illusion created by a system Beckworth built into the house to entertain his guests and also points out that the house is full of secret passages that the killer could have used. The CBI team and others, headed by Jane, then try to find a treasure supposedly hidden in the house, and come upon a riddle instead. The killer (the former owner's jealous nephew) is tricked into sneaking undetected into the mansion again in an attempt to locate the treasure, whereupon he is apprehended by the CBI upon arrival. Jane then reveals that he wrote the riddle himself. Van Pelt and Rigsby become closer during this episode, and finally express their feelings for one another.
29	6	"Black Gold and Red Blood"	Rod Hardy	Bruno Heller	November 5, 2009	3X5356	16.21
During a murder investigation, Bosco arrests Jane after discovering the bug Jane placed in his office to keep track of the Red John case. Bosco demands Jane's resignation from the CBI in exchange for not pressing charges, only Jane, deciding that prison will be a great new experience, allows Bosco to charge him with spying on Bosco's team and the Red John case, and happily arrives at the county jail facility. Even from a jail cell, however, Jane still manages to help Lisbon's team with their ongoing investigation: while in jail, he uses the telephone to orchestrate a train of events that help the CBI solve the murder of a young man who was killed because of his knowledge that a prospective oil-drilling site was the habitat of a protected species. After figuring out who the culprit is, Jane escapes from jail and tricks the murderer into confessing. Facing the additional charges for escaping, Jane urges Lisbon to use her leverage – which he assumes is Bosco's love for her – to convince him to drop the charges against Jane. Jane deduces that the power imbalance in Lisbon's relationship with Bosco stems from an incident while they were partners in which Lisbon covered for Bosco when he murdered a killer, which she threatens to reveal if Bosco goes any further in his pursuit of Jane. Shaken, Bosco agrees.
30	7	"Red Bulls"	David M. Barrett	Tom Szentgyörgyi	November 12, 2009	3X5358	16.17
When two separate cases overlap (after a lead brings Bosco's team to one of Lisbon's crime scenes, nearly resulting in a shooting), Minelli orders Bosco's and Lisbon's units to team up for the investigation of a case in which the sister of a wealthy woman has been kidnapped, and work together to solve the crime. While the CBI attempts to find the culprits, the two different procedural approaches start to collide and soon cause tensions among the team members – Bosco struggles with the idea of working with Jane, believing that Jane is ruining the reputations of those who work with him. While following a suspect, Van Pelt is shot; Rigsby shoots and kills the suspect after she attempts to shoot a member of Bosco's team. With the ransom deadline looming, Jane realizes that there is an insider involved in the kidnapping, who turns out to be the nanny. The team finds her after she makes a phone call to the captors, then traces that number to a house at which they then arrive in time to retrieve the woman. In response to Jane's help on the kidnapping case, Bosco acknowledges that Jane offers a valuable perspective and asks for his input on the Red John case.
31	8	"His Red Right Hand"	Chris Long	Ashley Gable	November 19, 2009	3X5359	15.85
Lisbon's team arrives at CBI Headquarters and, upon going inside Bosco's office for an urgent briefing, find it is the scene of a fatal shooting – two members of Bosco's team have been killed, and Bosco himself is also wounded and in critical condition. An investigation begins, and when Patrick recognizes a link between a recent murder the team was investigating and Red John, the team hurriedly arrives at the workplace of the victim, only to find the third member of Bosco's team dead, murdered by Red John. Red John is revealed as being behind the carefully orchestrated series of attacks, which are found to have been triggered by Bosco having come uncomfortably close to identifying the infamous serial killer while investigating the discovery of the body of a Red John victim that had been missing. It turns out that the body had been removed and hidden because of forensic evidence left by Red John himself. However, the team arrives too late to recover the victim's body, as someone impersonating a CBI agent has picked it up, and later destroys all of the evidence relating to the case. It is found that the person who recovered the evidence was Bosco's secretary, Rebecca, who was also the assailant who shot Bosco and his team. Lisbon arrives at Bosco's hospital room to apprehend her just before she finishes him off. Before Bosco dies, he declares his love to Lisbon and wishes Jane luck in finding Red John. Jane interrogates Rebecca, demanding why she killed Bosco and his team. Although it seems to have been due to the fact that they were close to finding Red John, Rebecca admits that the real reason Bosco's team was eliminated is because Red John wants Jane to continue working on the case and ultimately solve it. Later on, Rebecca is poisoned while in custody and dies. Minelli is upset by the week's occurrences and decides to retire, while Rigsby and Van Pelt's relationship becomes more serious.
32	9	"A Price Above Rubies"	Charles Beeson	Eoghan Mahony	December 10, 2009	3X5360	16.37
While attending a black tie fundraiser for the CBI, Carl Ward – a wealthy jeweler and husband of CBI sponsor Esther Doverton – is shot and nearly killed at their jewelry store during a robbery. It is revealed that Carl was using an alias and had a criminal record, making him the prime suspect. However, safe cracker Doyle Murphy is seen on a security camera, so Jane and Lisbon search for a link between the two. They discover that one of Esther's nephews was Murphy's sponsor at rehab. By faking the kidnapping of Esther, the CBI team tricks her nephew Tom Doverton into admitting his guilt as he talks on the phone to a person who he believes is the kidnapper. He is taken into custody and Esther's husband recovers in the hospital. Throughout the episode, Rigsby and Van Pelt struggle with the thought of announcing their relationship.
33	10	"Throwing Fire"	Martha Mitchell	John Mankiewicz	December 17, 2009	3X5357	15.77
The CBI team investigate the murder of Barney Sloop; a former professional baseball player, who is found dead in his Zen garden. The victim had been the founder of a baseball academy, which he started as his own baseball talent scouting and training facility for young up-and-coming baseball talents. During the investigation, Jane is hit on the head with a baseball and knocked unconscious, after which he experiences flashbacks of his past as a stage performer with his father, Alex, and shows signs of his "psychic" abilities. The CBI team interviews several people close to the victim, including his ex-wife and his business partner Freddie. It is revealed that a player on the team was too old to attend the academy, so his father had been paying Freddie double the normal rate. After Sloop found out, the player's father killed him to prevent Sloop from ruining his son's future.
34	11	"Rose-Colored Glasses"	Dan Lerner	Leonard Dick	January 14, 2010	3X5361	15.38
The CBI team investigate the double homicide of Selby and Jana Vickers, a couple murdered on their way to Selby's 15th high-school reunion. The CBI team attends the reunion to gather information. Jane soon discovers a link to an old high-school rivalry: Selby had pulled a cruel prank on Derek Logan back in high school, and Logan has not been seen in years. Rigsby goes undercover posing as Derek Logan, and everyone at the reunion expresses surprise at his attendance. Two of Logan's former classmates, L.J. and Willa, become very uneasy after Rigsby states that he has come to the reunion to get his revenge. Lisbon and Jane follow Willa out of the room and, after locating her "trophy" picture, discover that Selby pulled the prank under her direction. Willa decided to kill the Vickers after Selby began blackmailing her to jeopardize her upcoming national talk show.
35	12	"Bleeding Heart"	Norberto Barba	Erika Green Swafford	January 21, 2010	3X5362	14.56
Jane and the CBI team are assigned to investigate the murder of Martha St Clair, a mayor's aide and media liaison, after the body is accidentally dug up by the mayor during the groundbreaking ceremony for Central Valley's large Granton building development. Jane riles the mayor, Melba Walker Shannon, and her personal assistant Wilson, especially after the CBI team uncovers the mayor's corrupt backhander from the developer. It is a case that draws the attention of the media and local eco-terrorists, with one suspect being the masked leader of the eco-warriors (pseudonym Jasper). Mike Brewster, a reporter, is assigned to watch the team's work and take some interviews with the staff, but initially he encounters a lack of co-operation until Jane decides to make amends and get to know him, but Jane is kidnapped by Jasper while out with Brewster. Jasper tells Jane he is not the murderer and Jane unmasks him as Wilson; he had gone undercover as the mayor's P.A. After Jane is rescued, Lisbon allows Brewster to observe as they stake out a suspect, but it leads instead to a surprise revelation by Jane that Brewster is the murderer. He killed Martha because she kept it a secret from him that she had discovered the mayor's corruption when as a reporter breaking that story would have made his career. Later, Rigsby and Van Pelt make a big announcement to their CBI team: they are lovers. This causes a problem because until now everyone but Lisbon knew, but now she officially knows they are breaking regulations.
36	13	"Redline"	Bill D'Elia	Jordan Harper	February 4, 2010	3X5363	14.68
Jane and the CBI team investigate when Liselle Douglas, a young saleswoman, is found dead in the trunk of a Bentley at Zenith Motor Gallery, an elite car dealership. Jane and Lisbon meet the sales team, except for lead salesman James Kinsey who is away sick. Brad Elias, second lead salesman, claims they are like "family", but Jane counters it is a gladiator pit, confirmed by owner Oliver Westhoff – at the end of each sales drive, the most successful salesman wins a prize, the least successful is fired. Liselle was fairly successful as the rich male clients were attracted to her and gave her gifts. Jane riles Kinsey when he takes his packed lunch out of the Zenith fridge, and Kinsey admits he asked Liselle out – she refused because she had a boyfriend. In the office, Lisbon talks to no-longer-secret lovers Rigsby and Van Pelt, saying she is obliged to report them at the end of the case, which means one of them will have to transfer. Sparhawk was Liselle's boyfriend: he is a poorly paid musician, has no alibi, and Liselle's job kept them afloat. They both hated her job and gave away client gifts except for one to fund their future wedding – a valuable picture from millionaire Walter Mashburn. He was Liselle's last appointment on the day she died. Lisbon and Jane meet Mashburn at a private club. He denies sleeping with Liselle and says the picture was a gift for finding him a rare car; he identifies Jane as being a charlatan psychic, and enjoys being a murder suspect. Cho reports that the night of the murder Westhoff called the police to report a Ferrari stolen from their service department but called back later to say never mind. The autopsy report shows Liselle was hit by a car – probably the Ferrari. Jane and Cho overhear Kinsey being angry with Westhoff – Kinsey risks losing the top salesman position due to his absence with stomach problems, his drop in performance signalled by Westhoff now taking an account from him. Mr Landau, a client, might have taken Mrs Landau's Ferrari since the Landaus are mid-divorce. Jane goes through the fridge and finds Kinsey's lunch, beef barley soup – Kinsey put his name on it as somebody had stolen his lunch recently. Van Pelt chafes when Rigsby assumes he will be the one to stay on at the CBI as he has been there longer. Landau explains he and his wife are reconciling. But when he hears how Liselle died he implicates Sparhawk – Landau had left drugs in the glove box and paid Sparhawk to steal the car. The CBI team locates the Ferrari, which Sparhawk has crashed, and Lisbon talks him down from threatening everyone with a samurai sword; he confesses to the murder. Meanwhile Jane has been entertaining Mashburn and his friends at the private club, but after a 'psychic' show in which Jane drives Mashburn's car blindfolded, the car rolls off the cliff into the sea. Lisbon realizes that Sparhawk feels liable but did not kill Liselle. Jane and Cho visit Zenith with Mashburn for Jane to buy a replacement car for Mashburn. Jane chooses Elias over Kinsey as salesman for this sale, saying the second-best tries harder. Jane ensures Mashburn's interest in a particular car but Elias tries to interest him in another. Jane then explains that Elias is feeling squeamish because he used this car to run over Liselle: Elias had been poisoning Kinsey's lunch to drop his performance so that Elias would gain top position. Liselle had caught Elias tampering with Kinsey's lunch and ordered him to confess on pain of her reporting him, but Elias knew that if he did Westhoff would fire him and Kinsey would call the cops, so he murdered Liselle. Jane had suspected Elias because the second-best tries harder and no one steals a barley beef lunch. Lisbon tells Rigsby and Van Pelt she will ignore their relationship provided they show no sign of it at work.
37	14	"Blood In, Blood Out"	John Polson	Ken Woodruff	February 11, 2010	3X5364	15.86
Cho helps the police with an investigation into the murder of David Seung, a member of Cho's former gang, the Avon Park Playboys, who also had been Cho's best friend when both were in the gang during Cho's early days. Jane insists on helping Cho with his off-the-books investigation, and so tags along.
38	15	"Red Herring"	Eric Laneuville	David Appelbaum	March 4, 2010	3X5365	14.87
Jane and the CBI team are asked to investigate the murder of Jeffrey Barge, a prominent, but arrogant, chef who was poisoned in the middle of a challenge at a best chef cooking competition in Napa Valley.
39	16	"Code Red"	John F. Showalter	Bruno Heller	March 11, 2010	3X5366	16.02
Dr. Alicia Seberg, a government bioweapons researcher, is exposed to a deadly virus on which she had been working. Due to its enormous monetary value and because the only antidote that works is one that must be taken before exposure (not after), all virus vials are carefully stored in a sealed area guarded by state-of-the-art retinal-scan security, and only four people had access. With only hours to live, she calls upon Jane and the CBI team to identify and catch her murderer. Jane's efforts are blocked by the overbearing by-the-book lead investigator Dean Harken, who was already on site about to conduct an audit, and who insists Seberg caused the accident herself. Seberg dies. While the area is being decontaminated, Jane discovers that the retinal security system has not been working properly for two months, which widens the list of suspects to include Harken himself. To flush out the murderer, Jane fakes the theft and opening of one of the virus vials so that everyone in the facility faces the prospect of death within hours; procedure means they cannot leave and the military will bomb the facility after they die so as to destroy the virus. When lab assistant Lilith Nash falls under suspicion Jane questions her and she informs him there is a culvert that affords a secret way out of the facility. Jane faked the theft of the vial as he knew the murderer would realise they had to escape the facility to avoid being bombed to death. Griffith Welks, one of Seberg's colleagues with authorised access to the virus and one of the original suspects, is caught by Rigsby and Cho at the culvert. He had been selling the virus for profit and when Harken arrived to conduct an audit he knew the theft would be revealed, so he framed Seberg.
40	17	"The Red Box"	Chris Long	John Mankiewicz	April 1, 2010	3X5367	14.11
Jane and the CBI team investigate the murder of a tutor, and find a mysterious little red box near the body, starting a chain of events that turns the murder into the search for a priceless ring stolen from the British Museum. Meanwhile, Lisbon is worried when a new boss, Madeleine Hightower, takes command of the CBI, and informs Lisbon that she has mysteriously learned about Rigsby and Van Pelt's relationship.
41	18	"Aingavite Baa (Red Water)"	Stephen Gyllenhaal	Tom Szentgyörgyi & Erika Green Swafford	April 8, 2010	3X5368	16.32
A "Jane Doe", covered in blood and suffering from amnesia, steps in front of Cho and Van Pelt's car, and Jane attempts to discover who she is and what happened, which leads to the team finding three additional bodies in a nearby barn. Jane takes up the job of helping the victim get her memory back. Through fingerprint identification, the CBI identifies Leonard Railton as one of the victims and follows clues to an Indian reservation. The other two victims were on a hike and were in the wrong place at the wrong time. Meanwhile, Hightower addresses the issue of the romantic relationship between Rigsby and Van Pelt – she confronts them about their relationship and instructs them to either break up or decide which one is to be transferred. Rigsby offers to leave the team, but Van Pelt decides to break up with him instead, not wanting the burden of being the reason he leaves the position he worked so hard to get and values so much.
42	19	"Blood Money"	Adam Kane	Ashley Gable & Jordan Harper	April 22, 2010	3X5369	14.96
Van Pelt (in a flashforward) orders a hit on Rigsby. Before, the CBI team arrives on the scene of the murder of ADA Kelly Flower. Jane quickly discovers and identifies her killer as Cale Sylvan, the building contractor at the Flowers' house, whom the CBI team learns is a psychopathic hitman/serial killer-for-hire, but they can find no proof of his double identity. Meanwhile Cho and Van Pelt confront docker Hank Draber whom ADA Kelly Flower was about to get convicted and sentenced to 20 years, in a case that would have made Flower's career and probably the next DA. The CBI believes Hank Draber ordered Sylvan to murder Flower, although Draber seems more concerned about upsetting his disabled mother. The team sets up an undercover operation where Van Pelt orders the hit and exposes Sylvan – Sylvan took trophy film footage of Flower begging for mercy and his killing her. In court, it is discovered that Jane had broken into the suspect's home in preparation for the sting and Judge Hildred informs ADA Odenthal and his prosecution team that the film footage is inadmissible and all charges are dismissed because they are "fruit of the poisonous tree". ADA Odenthal, who ambitiously expects to be DA eventually, is furious with Jane. Hightower suspends Lisbon for five days for her lack of control over Jane. The CBI team must now apprehend Sylvan on different evidence. Jane engineers a way to pick Sylvan's pocket and a logo on his gym bag indicates the location of Sylvan's secret murder house; the team arrest Sylvan just before he murders someone else. A mysterious skillful long-distance sniper shot kills Sylvan. Jane, assisted by Lisbon, reveals that Hank Draber's invalid mother is faking disability and is the real brains of the Draber illegal operations but the Drabers are not murderers. Back in court, Jane (deliberately) acts in contempt of court and tweaks ADA Odenthal's nose, causing him to be tried before Judge Hildred for battery. Jane elects to defend himself. Kelly Flower's widower is surprised to have been called to watch the hearing. Through his questioning, Jane admits battery but reveals to the court that Odenthal had hired Sylvan to kill Kelly Flower and then shot Sylvan after overhearing Judge Hildred issue a warrant for Sylvan – Kelly Flower had been promoted to the ADA job instead of Odenthal, a job he expected as his right. Hightower is pleased at the outcome and says she will get Lisbon reinstated.
43	20	"Red All Over"	Roxann Dawson	Carolyn Ingber	April 29, 2010	3X5370	14.84
Jane and the CBI team are called to the murder of Xander Harrington, a media mogul and a wealthy media corporation's CEO. The investigation leads to the Visualize Self-Realization Center – a cult-like religious group whose leader, Bret Stiles, may have had an axe to grind following the publication of a critical story about his group. Jane frets when Stiles mentions the death of his wife and daughter.
44	21	"18-5-4"	Charles Beeson	Leonard Dick & Ken Woodruff	May 6, 2010	3X5371	14.85
Jane and the CBI team investigate the death of Noah Valicat, murdered by a gun-wielding clown who cuts off the victim's right index finger. The CBI has to process scores of clowns, there for a movie audition. Lisbon and Jane interview the victim's brother Rafe and his widow Daphne. Noah was a mathematical genius, but a poor one, who had recently started using his skills to work as a day trader. He always hoped that one of his home-inventions would prove successful; meanwhile they barely survived on Daphne's waitress salary. Jane sees an unfinished chess game in progress – Noah was playing with chess with Tolman Bunting who runs a store selling puzzles. Jane and Bunting begin a verbal chess game with no board or pieces. Van Pelt finds that Noah's day-trader job was fictitious, instead finding files of seemingly random numbers and letters routinely e-mailed to "BeastSlayer". Lisbon is phoned by a panicked Daphne saying someone is in her house. The CBI team arrives. No one is inside but the house has been ransacked and the carpet in the bedroom has been ripped back to reveal a high-tech floor safe, which Daphne says she did not know about. Lisbon finds the safe's key under the bed: Noah's missing finger. Looking through the safe's contents, Jane finds a locker key marked 42. Jane makes himself tea in the neatly organized kitchen. "BeastSlayer" is Alec Mosca who says Noah offered to give analysis on his bets for a 10 percent cut which proved profitable for them both, but that lately his analyses were all wrong, angering Mosca who is now seriously in debt. Lisbon and Jane discover that Bunting is secretly employing computer geeks in a computer security business. Bunting says Noah was working on a "universal hack", a priceless device capable of decoding any encryption. He offered three people $2 million for whoever could do it first. Three weeks ago Noah called and said he'd done it but worried about it falling into the wrong hands. Bunting did not believe him. Jane tells him about the locker key. One of the other people building a device is in Amsterdam, the other is Oliver McDaniel who is a patient in a secure mental hospital. As Lisbon and Jane interview him, McDaniel eats spaghetti and meatballs from a tin can, and seems uninterested in the universal hack device and the locker key that Jane shows him. Jane learns that McDaniel's music player plays soothing ocean sounds. As soon as Lisbon and Jane leave, McDaniel escapes using a duplicate pass-key made long before, which he has been using to come and go as he pleases. Jane spots McDaniel's escape to Brazil as a ruse and instead goes to a seaside resort – McDaniel's choice of "music" inferred it and he ordered tins of spaghetti and meatballs. As the CBI team follows McDaniel, a hooded man knocks him out. The team chases the man into (and out of) a locker room, McDaniel's destination. They arrest the hooded man – Bunting. Jane recovers the universal hack device from the locker that is 4 rows across and 2 down. McDaniel says that during Noah's murder he was at a strip club's buffet. Bunting uses his contacts and the attorney general orders Lisbon to drop the charges. Jane meets Daphne, Rafe and Bunting at the Valicat house with the universal hack machine – Bunting wants it but Jane says Daphne, as the widow, is the owner. The machine does not work until Daphne flicks a switch. Text appears on the screen, scrolling: "My wife killed me." Daphne admits murdering Noah because her life was lonely and a drudge. She wanted the wealth the universal hack would provide but Noah hid it. She knew about the safe and how to open it (Noah's finger) but the device was not in there. Jane tells Lisbon he figured out it was Daphne as the kitchen was unsearched during the (fake) break-in because it was her domain – she knew it was not in the kitchen. At CBI headquarters Bunting takes possession of the device. Jane apologises that he had "a little fiddle with it" – now it is nothing more than a collection of useless loose parts. Threatening legal action, Bunting is about to stalk out when Jane finishes their chess game, by winning.
45	22	"Red Letter"	John F. Showalter	Eoghan Mahony	May 13, 2010	3X5372	14.84
When the CBI conduct an investigation into the murder of Hector Brava, the charismatic head of a non-profit organization that fights human trafficking and a top charity organizer, Jane is reunited with the supposed psychic Kristina Frye.
46	23	"Red Sky in the Morning"	Chris Long	Bruno Heller	May 20, 2010	3X5373	15.22
When the CBI team conduct an investigation into a murder by a Red John copycat who posted on the Internet a snuff film of a student being killed, Jane convinces Hightower not to let his psychic friend, Kristina Frye, help in the case. However, Frye is put in grave danger when she reaches out to the real Red John and then tries to contact him by appearing on TV. Her actions have dire consequences for both her and Jane, as Red John kidnaps Kristina and then saves Jane from the copycat.

== International reception ==
In the UK, the second season aired on FIVE, on Fridays at 9pm. The series premiered on February 19, 2010, and concluded on July 23, 2010. The season premiered with 3.10 million viewers. The most watched episode of the season was Red Menace (3.17 million viewers), and the least watched was Aingavite Baa (2.09 million viewers), although the latter was broadcast at the later time of 10pm.

== DVD release ==
All 23 episodes were released on the five disc complete second season set. It was released on September 21, 2010 in Region 1, November 8, 2010 in Region 2, and November 10, 2010 in Region 4. It included the featurettes "Mentalism: A Subliminal Art" and "The Art of The Mentalist with Chris Long" as well as unaired scenes.
