= Alex Berger =

American entrepreneur (born 1962)

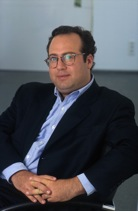
- Alex Berger in 2000.
- Born: March 22, 1962 (age 64); Philadelphia, Pennsylvania U.S.
- Occupations: Businessman; television and film producer; strategy consultant

Alex Berger (born March 22, 1962) is a producer, creator, consultant and entrepreneur in the media field.

== Biography ==
=== Childhood and family ===
He was born March 22, 1962, in Philadelphia in the US. He is the son of Francine Dreyfus-Berger, a French painter and Dr. Joseph Berger, PhD. In 1972, he moved to France with his parents and his sister Sylvie Berger. After a French schooling, he briefly studied at the University of Pennsylvania, then lived between the US and Europe. He currently lives in Paris, with his wife Florence Servan-Schreiber and their three children.

=== Invention of Vizzavi ===
In 1997, Alex Berger invents the multi-access web portal Vizzavi, which consists of enabling premium content to travel seamlessly between all of the subscribers and their services and devices ( Canal+ pay TV and CanalSatellite pay channels, AOL Europe subscribers, SFR mobile subscribers, Numéricâble subscribers.)... This system named Vizzavi, was co-owned by Vodafone under the name Vodafone Live. service.

=== CanalNumedia & VivendiNet ===
In 1998, Berger founded and became the first CEO of CanalNumedia and all the gaming activities of the group (2nd worldwide) and football, cinema and photography sites.

In 1999 he founded and became the co-CEO of Vivendi Universal Net (VivendiNet) along with Franck Boulben. VivendiNet regrouped all digital contents of:

- Canal+/CanalNumedia (sports and cinema websites and Allociné
- Havas with all of its publications and digital assets such as Scoot, bonjour !, 01.net, la Vie Financière
- Cegetel (SFR) and Vizzavi
- All the venture capital funds (Viventures) and the incubator @VISO co-owned 50/50 with SOFTBANK

=== Vivendi, Universal & Canal+ merge ===
Once approved by Jean Marie Messier and Pierre Lescure, Alex Berger initiated the discussions with Universal. With the help of Terry Semel, former CEO of Warner Brothers, they approached Edgar Bronfman Jr, CEO of Seagram, owned by Universal. This strategy led to Vivendi, Universal and Canal+ to merge in June 2000.

After the merger was finalised in June 2000, Alex Berger was at a strategic position between Vivendi-Universal CEO Jean-Marie Messier and Canal+ Group CEO Pierre Lescure, head of content and digital. Internal politics and infighting raging, Alex Berger decided to leave Canal+ group in September 2000.

=== Berger Report (2019) ===
On a new organisation for scripted drama series in France

Alex Berger was asked to write a report for the CNC (Centre national du cinéma et de l'image animée (French National Center for Cinema and Animation) on a new organization of scripted drama in France. The report was commissioned by the CNC to examine what changes were needed in the French television industry to meet the standards and demands of the new, so-called "golden age" of scripted drama. Using Le Bureau des Légendes (The Bureau) as a case study, it explores the paradigm shift brought about by the rise of digital platforms and how that transformation has affected the development, production, and distribution of television series.

=== Television appearance ===
In 1992, he interpreted the character of Jean-Robert Günther in L'Émission impossible on TF1, the first show of the TV presenter Arthur on television. In 1994, he made an appearance on Canal+ in the very last sketch of the show in Nulle part ailleurs of Antoine de Caunes and José Garcia. With the humoristic group Les Nuls as a guest on the set, he made a parody of one of them, Dominique Farrugia

=== Cinema appearance ===
Alex Berger interpreted the character of Caius Tchounus Mogulus, in Astérix et Obélix: Mission Cléopâtre of Alain Chabat.
