= Patrick Jane =

Patrick J. Jane,
- The Mentalist character
- Simon Baker as Patrick Jane
- First appearance: "Pilot"
- Last appearance: "White Orchids"
- Created by: Bruno Heller
- Portrayed by: Simon Baker; Chris Brochu (young Jane)

In-universe information
- Alias: The Mentalist
- Nicknames: Goldielocks, Blondie, Patty, Charlatan, Carnac, Carnie, Jane, Jerk, Genius, S.O.B., Fake Psychic, The Boy Wonder
- Gender: Male
- Title: Consultant
- Occupation: Independent consultant for the Federal Bureau of Investigation (2016–present); Independent consultant for the California Bureau of Investigation (2004–2012, 2013–2014); Fake psychic and medium (1990s – 2003); Circus attraction and showman (mid-1980s)
- Family: Alex Jane (father)
- Spouses: Angela Ruskin (deceased); Teresa Lisbon (m. 2017)
- Children: Charlotte Anne Jane (deceased; with Angela); Unborn child (with Teresa)
- Nationality: American
- Birth: 16 September 1974 (age 52) or c. 1969

Patrick Jane is a fictional character and the protagonist of the CBS crime drama The Mentalist, portrayed by Simon Baker. Jane is an independent consultant for the California Bureau of Investigation, and helps by giving advice and insights from his many years as a fake psychic medium. He uses his keen powers of observation, his knowledge of psychology, and his genius to help lead the investigations.

Creator Bruno Heller describes the character as being a combination of a Sherlock Holmes and a street psychic, part detective helping people and part con-artist selling people lies. Wanting the character to have both physical and spiritual grace, Heller imagined someone like Cary Grant for the role.

== Character background ==
Patrick Jane is a consulting member of the CBI (California Bureau of Investigation) crime fighting unit. He is unconventional and commonly defies police procedure, often acting without apparent empathy for suspects or families suffering losses.

His past is revealed slowly through five of the show's seven seasons. The revelations come through flashbacks and Jane's statements. In the episode "Throwing Fire" it is revealed that Jane was raised by a swindler father who included his young son in his carnival psychic act, touting Jane as "the boy wonder". Jane never went to school, as revealed in the episode "Rose-Colored Glasses".

He married Angela Ruskin, who was from a similar background, her family being members of a traveling carnival and "carnival royalty". The couple had a daughter, Charlotte. According to The Mentalist Code (2013), Charlotte Jane was named after two films written by the father of Bruno Heller, Lukas Heller: Hush...Hush, Sweet Charlotte and What Ever Happened to Baby Jane?.

Prior to working at the CBI, Jane suffered a nervous breakdown due to guilt over the death of his family. He has kept the incident a secret from his CBI co-workers, and it is not in his records.

Jane uses his mentalist abilities to solve crimes, but his main objective is to find Red John who had killed his wife and daughter. He has stated that he plans to kill Red John rather than to commit him to legal incarceration, though his direct supervisor, Teresa Lisbon, appears to doubt his sincerity in this regard.

Jane initially joined the CBI one year after the death of his wife and daughter. The season 5 episode "Red Dawn" revealed Jane originally came to the CBI in an attempt to gain access, as a civilian, to the Red John case files. He was discouraged from doing so, but when assaulted by a then-agent of the CBI, Stephen Hannigan, he was allowed to look at the files out of an attempt to appease him and avoid a lawsuit. He became involved in a then-current investigation of Lisbon and her team, managed to solve the case using his unique abilities, and as a result was employed as a consultant by then-CBI Head Virgil Minelli.

Two years after the events of "Red John", Jane resides in an unnamed Spanish-speaking island (most likely in Venezuela, as the telephone country code is 58), eventually agreeing to return to the U.S. as a consultant for the FBI in exchange for his charges being dropped, on the condition that Lisbon works with him.

== Relationship with Red John ==
Jane has suggested on a number of occasions that he considers Red John's death or capture to be a higher priority than his own life. In turn, Red John appears to hold a similar obsession with Jane, to the point of risking capture for the purpose of observing him. In the episode "His Red Right Hand", he is described as being similar to Jane in his ability to "see through people". Red John has a CBI team murdered with help from a mole on the inside, just so he can have Jane back on his case because his family was murdered.

During the second-season finale, Jane and Red John finally meet. However, Jane is unable to see Red John's face because it is hidden by a rubber mask, and Jane is tied to a chair. Ironically, Red John saves Jane from three students who have committed Red John copycat crimes and are about to kill Jane.

At the end of the third-season finale, Jane meets a man whom he believes is Red John. During their conversation, "Red John" encourages Jane to forget about him, and says that seeking vengeance is a waste of his valuable life. Patrick asks if he is the real Red John, to which the man gives detailed comments about Patrick's wife and daughter. When "Red John" attempts to walk away after their brief talk, Jane shoots him with a handgun, then sits down and waits to be arrested. It is revealed in season 4 that the man Jane shot was an imposter, and Red John remains at large.

In the fourth season finale, Red John extends a hand of friendship to a distraught and derelict Jane, believing that Jane has lost all hope and has lost his way in life. Jane, however, has contrived his own nervous breakdown in order to draw out his adversary. Jane meets with Red John inside a limousine, unable to see his face. Red John proposes his offer for friendship yet again, but Jane replies, "Go to hell". Later, the CBI closes in on the vehicle, arresting Red John's friend Lorelei Martins, but discovering Red John was never in the limousine and was communicating via a burner phone attached to the kidnapped Luther Wainright, who is inadvertently killed.

In season 5, Jane becomes determined to discover Red John's identity. In episode 16, he reveals that he will do anything to get to Red John. In episode 8, Lorelei Martins accidentally reveals to Jane that he has already shaken hands with Red John. Although Jane doesn't identify Red John in season 5, in the finale, in a pre-mortem video, Red John delivers a message via the now dead Lorelei Martins. This video reveals the final seven Red John suspects and predicted how Jane would come across the video nearly two months after its filming; having done that, she reveals Red John's prediction of Jane's suspect list, which matches Jane's actual list exactly.

In season 6 of the series, Jane finally tracks down Red John and, in a gambit exploiting Red John's fear of birds, manages to shoot him. Though Red John briefly gets away, Jane ultimately apprehends him. To go through with his revenge, he strangles Red John to death.

A symbolic relationship also exists between the two. They represent The Tyger and The Lamb by William Blake. They are a part of a "fearful symmetry" that expresses itself in the actual drama of the series and in a secret code that presents itself covertly throughout the series.

== Relationship with Teresa Lisbon ==
Since the beginning of the show, Jane is shown to care deeply about Lisbon, who is not only his supervisor, but, in the final season, his eventual wife. Throughout the series, they are shown to have a very close relationship and trust each other. Bruno Heller has stated that some people interpret the relationship between the two characters as romantic while others view it merely as a brother-sister type of bond.

In the sixth season, Lisbon gets engaged to FBI agent Marcus Pike, which causes Jane to realize his true feelings for her. In the season finale, "Blue Bird", Patrick openly admits his love for Teresa and at the end of the episode, they finally kiss. Lisbon consequently breaks off her engagement to Pike.

In the seventh season, Jane and Lisbon start a romantic relationship. However, at Teresa's request, they keep their love affair secret from their team members.

In the series finale, "White Orchids", Jane proposes to Lisbon and she tearfully accepts. In a simple ceremony, Patrick and Teresa exchange vows in front of family and friends, on the land Jane has purchased for their future home. At the end of the episode, Teresa turns to Patrick and says, "There's something I need to tell you". Patrick looks down to see Teresa's hand on her belly. He is rapt with joy as Teresa confirms she is pregnant with the newlyweds' first child together.

== Appearance and personality ==
=== Personal style ===
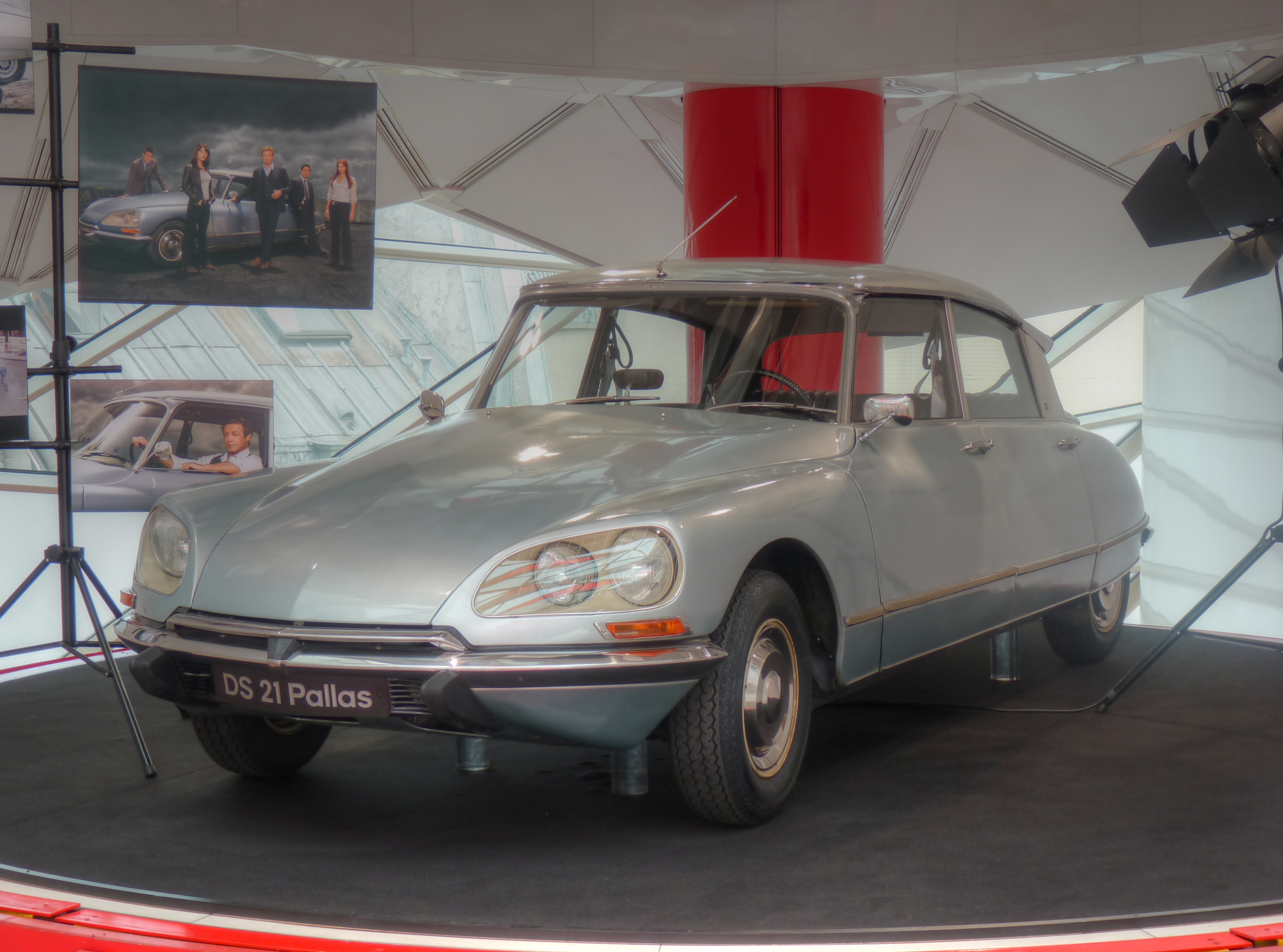
The Citroën DS 21 used in the show

Jane characteristically wears a three-piece suit with no tie (though in flashback episodes, pre-CBI, he does wear the tie), and the same brown, leather shoes. His wearing of the suit with the vest has been explained by the show's creator, Bruno Heller, as follows:

"The thinking is these were the suits he used to wear as a mentalist and he would have them dry cleaned and pressed. Now he gets them out of the bottom of the cupboard. It's also a magician thing. They wear vests because they need to be able to hide things."

Jane wears the same brown, scuffed leather shoes in each episode. In the episode "Not One Red Cent" in season 5, he finally has them re-soled.

Jane drives a pristine condition Citroën DS 21 Pallas.

Midway through season 6, and after the death of Red John, Jane's appearance changes. He stops wearing his characteristic vests, though he wears battered suits and his scruffy shoes. Also, he changes his vehicle to the 1985 Airstream 270.

In the fourth episode of season 7, Jane decides to wear the vest again and continues wearing it until the end of the series.

=== Skills and abilities ===
Patrick Jane has a wide range of skills and abilities. He's a "Jack of All Trades" so to speak.

Jane was once a fake psychic and used skills of cold reading, and hot reading. However, since he began work with the CBI he switched to more honest, psychological methods of reading people.

Apart from his main ability of reading people he has a knowledge physiognomy and reading micro-expressions. He also occasionally reads pulses to detect lies.

Jane is great at hypnosis, a skill he uses to get suspects to confess to their crimes, and witnesses to remember things that they saw.

He also has an incredible memory. His main technique is the memory palace. He uses his memory palace to recall massive bodies of information.

Jane is a showman with skills in sleight of hand and magic, as well as pickpocketing and lock picking. He will occasionally use these skills when solving crimes, but they are rarely useful.

Jane is also good at chess, card games (especially poker), backgammon, pool, and pinball although these skills almost never aid in solving crimes.

=== Personality ===
Jane's personality has undergone a dramatic change since the death of his family. Though the season 2 episode "Throwing Fire" shows a teenage Jane tutored by an unscrupulous father, the young Jane seems to have nevertheless had somewhat of a conscience. However, in his adult life as a "mentalist", he has been shown to have manipulated and conned numerous people for profit. In his mentalist heyday, this brought him both a great deal of money (enough to buy a house in Malibu) and a certain amount of fame (his photo can be seen gracing the cover of framed magazines in his home at the time). The season 4 episode "Fugue in Red", where Jane partially loses his memory as a result of a near drowning, reveals to some degree the selfishness and amorality of the pre-CBI Jane. This prompts fellow CBI agent Kimball Cho (Tim Kang) to remark to his CBI colleagues, "Don't take this the wrong way, but the death of Jane's family made him a better person."

Jane is camera shy, and often expresses reluctance to be interviewed or otherwise filmed, presumably another change in personality since his heyday as a television mentalist. He also consciously avoids situations where he will be thanked (e.g. by a murder victim's family when the culprit is apprehended) or made the center of attention.

Jane has been shown to have an affinity for and unusually good rapport with children. On multiple occasions, he befriends them and addresses them with empathy. Conversely, he has little regard for figures of authority, and often expresses himself to such individuals brusquely or even rudely.

Despite his obsession with finding Red John and his anguish and guilt over the loss of his family, Jane occasionally behaves in a spontaneous, even lighthearted fashion, expressing delight in simple pleasures such as open air, music, and natural beauty. Heller has stated, of Jane's temperament: "(Jane) is on the surface a happy person and kind of graceful and light. The idea is to show that grace and lightness is an act of heroism; it's not simple-minded happiness. It's a conscious decision he is making to live his life positively."

Jane appears to have a strong aversion to violence. When threatened or attacked, his first response is always to run away or hide behind his colleagues, and when he is actually struck or beaten he does not retaliate. Despite this apparent pacifism, he does use violence when he considers it absolutely necessary. As of season 6, Jane has killed four men. Jane shoots the first, police officer Dumar Hardy, with a shotgun in the episode "Red John's Footsteps", in order to save Lisbon's life. He throws down the shotgun immediately afterward, visibly shocked by his actions. In the season three finale "Strawberries and Cream Part II" Jane shoots with a pistol a man he believes to be Red John himself, though it is later revealed the man's name was Timothy Carter and he was merely an impersonator. In the episode "Red John" (season 6), Jane finally exacts his revenge on Red John, shooting him with a pistol before chasing him down and strangling him to death. In the process, he kills Oscar Cordero, Red John's henchman, by shooting him as he rushes into the church to save Red John.

Jane has expressed a dislike of coffee, but drinks tea in nearly every episode. He appears to have basic computer literacy but typically expresses no interest in using such technology. In one episode, he asks Grace Van Pelt to "bigify" something on the computer, meaning to zoom in.

== Reception ==
Simon Baker has been nominated for several awards for his portrayal of Jane, including the Primetime Emmy Award for Outstanding Lead Actor – Drama Series, a Golden Globe Award for Best Actor – Television Series Drama, and a Screen Actors Guild Award for Outstanding Performance by a Male Actor in a Drama Series. Patrick Jane was also included in TV Guide's list of "TV's Sexiest Crime Fighters". The character of Osamu Dazai in the manga and anime Bungo Stray Dogs, is named after the Japanese author, and partially inspired by Simon Baker's portrayal of Patrick Jane.
