= Owain Yeoman =

Welsh actor (born 1978)

- Born: Owain Sebastian Yeoman; 2 July 1978 (age 48); Chepstow, Wales
- Education: Brasenose College, Oxford; Royal Academy of Dramatic Art
- Occupation: Actor
- Years active: 2004–present
- Height: 6 ft 4 in (1.93 m)
- Spouses: Lucy Davis (m. 2006; div. 2011) Gigi Yallouz (m. 2013)
- Children: 2

Owain Sebastian Yeoman (born 2 July 1978) is a Welsh actor, best known for playing CBI Agent Wayne Rigsby in the CBS series The Mentalist. His additional credits include The Nine, Kitchen Confidential, Turn (as Benedict Arnold), Generation Kill, and Emergence.

== Early life ==
Yeoman was born and raised in Chepstow, Monmouthshire, Wales, where his parents, Michael and Hilary, still live. He attended Wantage CofE Primary School before attending school at Wyedean School in Sedbury, Gloucestershire, where he showed a keen interest in English language, English literature, and was involved in the school's amateur dramatics productions.

He studied English literature at Oxford University as a member of Brasenose College, and graduated BA, which matured into an MA. In those years, he was a member of the OUDS and Oxford Revue. He had planned to continue doctoral studies but was not able to secure a grant. Instead, he worked for a time at a bank in Canary Wharf, London before enrolling at the Royal Academy of Dramatic Art to study acting alongside acclaimed method actor Pieter Lawman.

== Career ==
Yeoman made his film debut as Lysander in the Oscar nominated film Troy. He also had a small part in Broken Lizard's film, Beerfest, and made a guest appearance on an episode of Midsomer Murders entitled "Dead in the Water". He played Sgt. Eric Kocher in the HBO miniseries, Generation Kill (2008). He played the major villain, a T-888 model cyborg Terminator named "Cromartie", in the pilot episode of Terminator: The Sarah Connor Chronicles. The role was taken over by Garret Dillahunt in the rest of the series.

Yeoman played Wayne Rigsby in The Mentalist. He starred in every episode to the sixth season, alongside Simon Baker, Robin Tunney, Amanda Righetti and Tim Kang. He also starred in ChromeSkull: Laid to Rest 2. In 2013, it was confirmed that Yeoman and Righetti were leaving The Mentalist after the sixth season. He guest-starred in episodes 10 and 11 of Extant in 2014.

Yeoman also had a small role in the American drama American Sniper, his first major breakthrough on the big screen. From 2015 to 2017, he portrayed General Benedict Arnold in seasons 2-4 of the TV series Turn: Washington's Spies. Yeoman portrayed Vartox on the pilot of DC Comics TV series Supergirl.

== Personal life ==
Yeoman was married to actress Lucy Davis from December 2006 to October 2011; the wedding took place at St Paul's Cathedral, London. Davis and Yeoman were permitted to marry there as her father, Robert (better known by his stage name Jasper Carrott), had been awarded an OBE in the New Year's Honours in 2002. On 7 September 2013, Yeoman married jewellery designer Gigi Yallouz at a private estate in Malibu, California, UE.

Yeoman is a vegetarian and was photographed for PETA's vegetarianism campaign.

== Filmography ==
=== Film ===
Year	Title	Role	Notes
2004	Troy	Lysander	
2006	Beerfest	Aussie Sailor #1	
2007	A Recipe for Comedy	Himself	Video Documentary Short
2009	The Mentalist: Evidence of a Hit Series	Himself	Video Short
2011	Chromeskull: Laid to Rest 2	King	
2012	AbsolutSin	Man	Short
2014	American Sniper	Ranger One	
2016	The Belko Experiment	Terry Winter	
2020	Brahms: The Boy II	Sean	
2021	SAS: Red Notice	Olly	
2022	Save the Cinema	David Evans	

=== Television ===
Year	Title	Role	Notes
2004	Midsomer Murders	Henry Charlton	1 episode
2004	Commando Nanny	Miles Ross	N/A
2005–2006	Kitchen Confidential	Steven Daedalus	Main role, 13 episodes
2006–2007	The Nine	Lucas Dalton	Main role, 13 episodes
2007	Traveling in Packs	Ken	Television movie
2008	Terminator: The Sarah Connor Chronicles	Cromartie (T-888)	Episode: "Pilot"
2008	Generation Kill	Sgt. Eric Kocher	7 episodes
2008–2015	The Mentalist	Wayne Rigsby	Main role, 132 episodes
2008–2009; 2013	Entertainment Tonight	Himself	4 episodes
2009	Britannia Awards	Himself	Television special
2009	Loose Women	Himself	1 episode
2010	Live from Studio Five	Himself	1 episode
2010	24th Annual Genesis Awards	Himself	Television special
2011	25th Annual Genesis Awards	Himself	Television special
2011	The Cleveland Show	Narrator (Voice)	1 episode
2012	26th Annual Genesis Awards	Himself	Television special
2013	Hell's Kitchen	Himself	1 episode
2014	Extant	Dr. Mason	3 episodes
2015	Supergirl	Vartox	Episode: "Pilot"
2015–2017	Turn: Washington Spies	Benedict Arnold	Main role, 29 episodes
2016	Elementary	Julius Kent	1 episode
2017	The Blacklist	Greyson Blaise	Episode: "Greyson Blaise (No.37)"
2019–2020	Emergence	Benny Gallagher	Main role, 13 episodes
2023	True Lies	Pieter Voss	Episode: "Separate Pairs"
2024	CSI: Vegas	Truman Thomas	Episode: "It Was Automation"
2025	Bosch: Legacy	Jimmy McKee	Episode: "Dig Down"
2025	Tracker	Nicholas	Episode: "Memories"
2026	Matlock	Ron Henson Jr.	Episode: "Tail Lights"
