= Amanda Righetti =

American actress

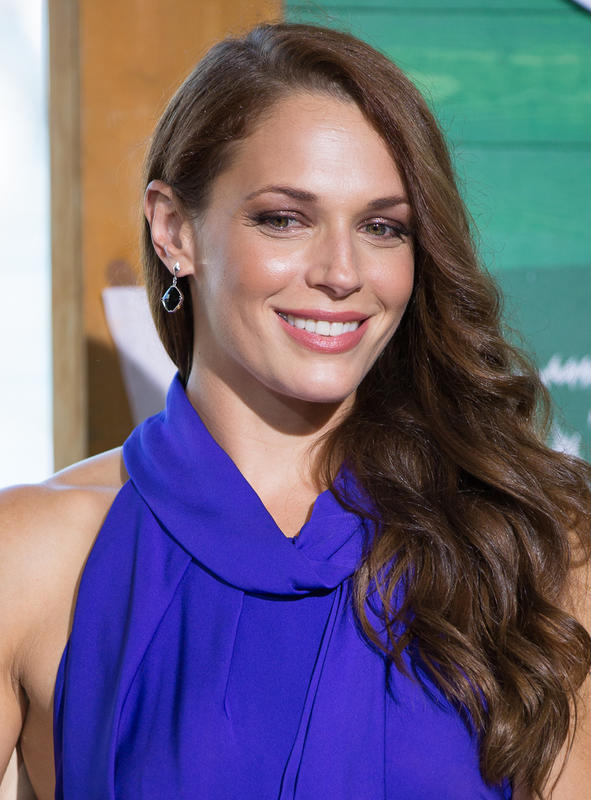
- Righetti in 2016
- Born: Amanda Righetti; April 4, 1983 (age 43); St. George, Utah, U.S.
- Occupation: Actress
- Years active: 1995–present
- Spouse: Jordan Alan (m. 2006; div. 2017)
- Children: 1

Amanda Righetti (born April 4, 1983) is an American actress. She is known for playing Grace Van Pelt on The Mentalist and her roles in Friday the 13th, The O.C. and Colony.

== Early life ==
The youngest of eight children, Righetti was born on April 4, 1983, in St. George, Utah, and raised in Nevada, outside Las Vegas. Her father, Alexander Dominic Righetti, is of Italian descent, while her mother, Linda Carol Chisum, is of German, French, and English descent.

== Career ==
Righetti started modeling at age 14, then moved to Los Angeles at 18 to start her acting career. After securing a role in the pilot for a proposed series by the name of No Place Like Home, she played a recurring character in the teen drama The O.C., was a regular in the primetime soap opera North Shore, and in late 2005, Righetti starred in Fox's drama series Reunion. Her other credits include a recurring role on K-Ville, guest roles on CSI: Crime Scene Investigation and Entourage, and a role in the television film Romy and Michele: In the Beginning.

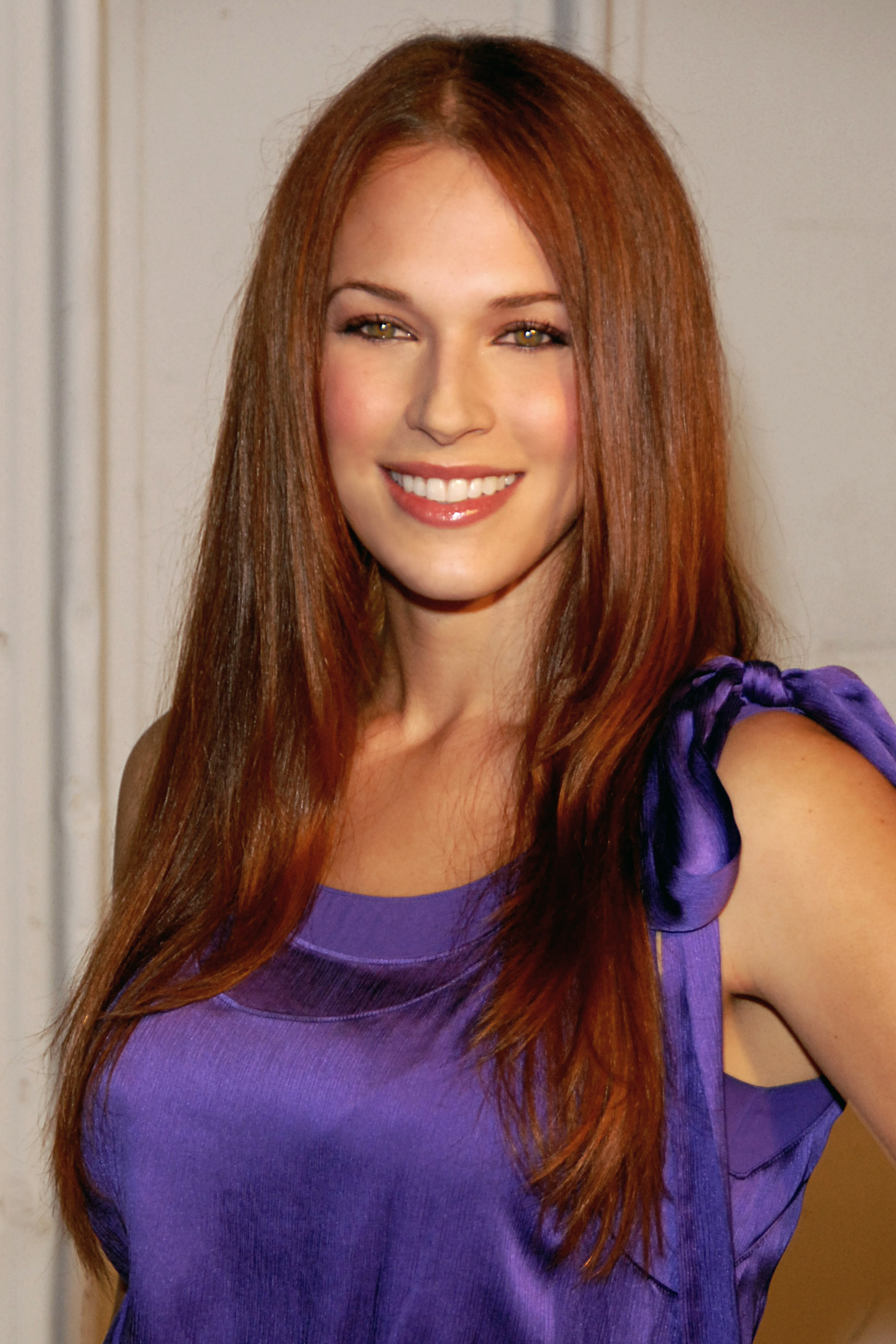
Righetti attending Maxim's 10th Annual Hot 100 Celebration, 2009

In 2006, Righetti signed on to star as the female lead in horror sequel Return to House on Haunted Hill. The film was released direct-to-video in October 2007. In April 2008, she was cast as the female lead in the slasher film Friday the 13th (2009). Production ended in June 2008 and the film was released in theaters on February 13, 2009. Also that year, Righetti was signed to the CBS series The Mentalist, in the role of Grace Van Pelt. Her 2012 to 2013 pregnancy was not reflected in her character's storyline, during which she was filmed using selective angles and largely limited to desk duty. Righetti left The Mentalist after season six.

In September 2011, Righetti signed with talent agency UTA.

From 2016 to 2017, Righetti played role of Maddie Kenner in Colony.

In 2017, Righetti starred as a divorced novelist in the Hallmark Channel television film Love at the Shore.

Righetti starred in the 2021 holiday romance film Christmas at the Ranch, with Lindsay Wagner, Laur Allen, Archie Kao, and Dia Frampton, playing the character Kate.

In 2024, Righetti played Nelle Reagan, the mother of United States President Ronald Reagan in Sean McNamara's biopic Reagan.

== Personal life ==
Righetti married director and writer Jordan Alan on April 29, 2006, on the Hawaiian island of Oahu. They have a son, born in 2013. Righetti filed for divorce in 2017.

== Filmography ==
=== Film ===
Year	Title	Role	Notes
1995	Love and Happiness	Charlie's Kid Sister	
1996	Kiss & Tell	Little One	
2002	Angel Blade	Samantha Goodman	
2007	Pipeline	Jocelyn	Also producer
2007	Return to House on Haunted Hill	Ariel Wolfe	Direct to video
2008	Matter	Stranger	Short film; also producer
2008	Role Models	Isabel	
2009	Friday the 13th	Whitney Miller	
2011	Captain America: The First Avenger	S.H.I.E.L.D. Agent	
2011	The Chateau Meroux	Jennifer	
2011	Wandering Eye	Maren Abbott	
2012	Shadow of Fear	Casey Cooper	Also known as Dangerous Attraction
2013	Crystal Lake Memories: The Complete History of Friday the 13th	Herself	Documentary film
2015	Cats Dancing on Jupiter	Josephine Smart	Also co-producer
2019	Pastalight	Susanna Lenzi	Short film
2021	Christmas at the Ranch	Kate	
2021	Queer Fish in God's Waiting Room	Misty	Short film, Also producer
2023	Far Haven	Lilly Rayne	
2024	Reagan	Nelle Reagan	
TBA	Relentless		

=== Television ===
Year	Title	Role	Notes
2001	CSI: Crime Scene Investigation	Riding Teen	Episode: "You've Got Male"
2002	Greg the Bunny	Debbie Fishman	Episode: "Surprise!"
2003–2005	The O.C.	Hailey Nichol	Recurring role (seasons 1–2)
2004–2005	North Shore	Tessa Lewis	Main role
2005	Romy and Michele: In the Beginning	Friendly Girl	Television film
2005–2006	Reunion	Jenna Moretti	Main role
2006	Entourage	Katrina	Episode: "Aquamom"
2006	Enemies	Kelly Callaway	Episode: "Pilot"
2007	K-Ville	A. J. Gossett	3 episodes
2007	Marlowe	Jessica Reede	Television film
2008–2015	The Mentalist	Grace Van Pelt	Main role (seasons 1–6), guest (season 7)
2009	His Name Was Jason: 30 Years of Friday the 13th	Herself	Documentary film
2011	Wandering Eye	Maron Abbott	Television film
2012	Shadow of Fear	Casey Cooper	Television film
2014	Chicago Fire	Dr. Holly Whelan	Episode: "A Dark Day"
2014	Chicago P.D.	Dr. Holly Whelan	Episode: "8:30 PM"
2016–2017	Colony	Maddie Kenner	Main role (seasons 1–2)
2017	Love at the Shore	Jenna	Television film (Hallmark)
2020	Deranged Granny	Kendall Thompson	Television film
2020	L.A.'s Finest	Beverly Gamble	3 episodes
2022	Family Friends	Sienna Hart	
2026	Scarpetta	Dorothy Scarpetta (Past)	Main role

=== Video games ===
Year	Title	Role	Notes
2006	Scarface: The World Is Yours	Femme Fatale (Voice)	

== Awards ==
- 2009 New York Independent International Film and Video Festival: Best Actress in a Short Film – Amanda Righetti in Matter
