= Tom Maden =

American actor

- Born: Texas, US
- Occupation: Actor
- Years active: 2004–present

Tom Maden is an American actor, who is perhaps best known for his recurring role as Jake Fitzgerald in the MTV anthology slasher series Scream, from 2015 to 2016. Prior to acting, Maden was also a participant in the third season of the Discovery Kids reality series Endurance (2004–2005). Other prominent credits in Maden's career include main roles in the web series Lifeline (2017) and All Night (2018), as well as numerous recurring roles in television series, such as Parenthood (2011), Make It or Break It (2012), and Famous in Love (2017–2018). Additionally, Maden has starred in a number of films, including The Nanny Express (2008), General Education (2012), and The Ninth Passenger (2018).

== Life and career ==
=== Early life ===
Tom Maden was born in Texas, United States, and grew up in Los Angeles, California. Maden first came to prominence with his participation in the third season (2004–2005) of Endurance, entitled Endurance 3: Hawaii. The series, filmed on location at an island in Kauai's North Shore, consists of 21 episodes and aired on Discovery Kids between 2004 and 2005.

=== Career beginnings, Parenthood and Make It or Break It ===
In 2006, Maden made his television acting debut in a tenth season episode of the long–running The WB family series 7th Heaven, which was followed by his film debut in Reversion; alongside actors Leslie Silva and Jason Olive, the drama was released in 2008. That same year, Maden went on to star in an episode of the sitcom According to Jim, as well as appeared in the television movies Fall of Hyperion and Hallmark's The Nanny Express. His next two credits were in the 2010 independent films Breaking the Press and Spilt Milk, the latter starring Jake Johnson.

During 2011, Maden had a recurring role as Zach Bell on the NBC family comedy drama Parenthood, during the series' third season. He later guest starred in the CBS police procedural The Mentalist, in the fourth season episode "Something's Rotten in Redmund". In 2012, Maden had a recurring role on the ABC Family teen comedy series Make It or Break It. Throughout the series' third and final season, Maden portrayed Rigo, the boyfriend of main character Payson Keeler (actress Ayla Kell). Also in 2012, Maden was cast in the Warner Bros. comedy film General Education; the film was shot in Chico and Gridley, California, and released in August of that year.

From 2013 to 2015, Maden had numerous roles in both film and television. In 2013, he was featured in the television movie Untitled Bounty Hunter Project; the film starred Geena Davis and Marsha Mason. The actor's next credit that year was in a short film, The Lonely Waiter. Maden appeared in the fourth episode of the YouTube Geek & Sundry series, Caper, released in 2014. He later starred in the film Mission Air (2014), and in a fourth season episode of the ABC teen/family drama series Switched at Birth (2015).

=== Scream and other projects ===
Maden landed the recurring role on MTV's Scream, in late 2014. The television series, based on the slasher film series of the same name, follows a group of teenagers being stalked and targeted by a masked serial killer. Maden plays Jake Fitzgerald, a popular jock, member of the 'Lakewood Six', and the on-and-off again boyfriend of Brooke Maddox (actress Carlson Young). In preparation for the series, Maden and the cast watched the film series together; for the role of Jake, Maden took inspiration from the original Scream (1996) characters Stu Macher (actor Matthew Lillard) and Billy Loomis (actor Skeet Ulrich). Maden's character is killed off during the second season premiere episode, serving as a "major reset" to the season; yet, he continues to feature prominently in the storyline and in cameo appearances throughout the rest of the season. Maden also appears as Jake in an episode of the Scream web series If I Die (released on YouTube), and as himself in the first installment of the aftershow, Scream After Dark, which was released on MTV following the season two premiere. In a Screen Rant piece by Aedan Juvet, Jake Fitzgerald was ranked the second best character in the whole series, behind Brooke, with the author claiming Maden brought a "protective sense of kindness to the role".

After Scream, Maden was credited in television film A Housekeeper's Revenge, along with Kathryn Newton and Kenton Duty. He had a lead role in the Lifetime movie thriller Swim at Your Own Risk (previously, Killer Coach) as Bryce Hinge; the role was alongside Keesha Sharp and premiered on Lifetime on July 30, 2016. In 2017, Maden went on to appear in two episodes of the Netflix teen drama 13 Reasons Why, as Robert Wells, a librarian and leader of a poetry club that series protagonist Hannah Baker (actress Katherine Langford) attends. He starred in the YouTube Red series Lifeline as Tom, as well as recurred in Freeform's Famous in Love; the series, which starred Bella Thorne, had Maden appear as Adam throughout both seasons of its run.

In 2017, the actor was cast as Nino Clemente in the teen comedy series All Night. The series, which had a large ensemble cast featuring Maden, premiered on Hulu in May 2018. Later in 2018, Maden starred in the television movies Tomboy, and 25, the latter opposite Emily Osment and Matt Shively. With Jesse Metcalfe and Alexia Fast, Maden also headlined the Vancouver–based horror–thriller film The Ninth Passenger (2018). In 2019, Maden co–starred in the Hallmark film Love in the Sun, opposite Emeraude Toubia and Shawn Christian. The romantic–comedy was filmed in Florida, United States, and premiered on May 27, 2019. Moreover, he also starred in the YouTube science–fiction short film Sky Fighter, released in 2020.

== Filmography ==
=== Film ===
Year	Title	Role	Notes
2008	Reversion	Ray	
2010	Breaking the Press	Josh Conaghey	
2010	Split Milk	Josh	
2012	General Education	Chad	
2014	Mission Air	Michael Ireland	
2018	The Ninth Passenger	Lance	
2020	Iceland Is Best	Nikki	

=== Television ===
Year	Title	Role	Notes
2004–2005	Endurance	Himself	Reality TV
2006	7th Heaven	Student	Episode: "Got MLK?"
2008	According to Jim	Sammy	Episode: "Ruby's First Date"
2008	Fall of Hyperion	Lucas Hansen	Television film
2008	The Nanny Express	Jose	Television film
2011	Parenthood	Zach Bell	3 episodes
2012	The Mentalist	Billy	Episode: "Something Rotten in Redmund"
2012	Make It or Break It	Rigo	Recurring role
2013	Untitled Bounty Hunter Project	Nico Cortez	Television film
2015	Switched at Birth	Robbie Nicholson	Episode: "And It Cannot Be Changed"
2015–2016	Scream	Jake Fitzgerald	Recurring role
2016	Scream After Dark	Himself	Episode: "I Know What You Did Last Summer"
2016	A Housekeeper's Revenge	Ben Stiers	Television film
2016	Swim at Your Own Risk	Bryce Hinge	Television film
2017	13 Reasons Why	Robert Wells	2 episodes
2017–2018	Famous in Love	Adam	Recurring role
2018	Tomboy	Adam	TV film
2018	25	Jimmy	Unsold pilot
2018	All Night	Nino Clemente	Main role
2019	Love in the Sun	Kai	TV film
2021	Animal Kingdom	Jack	Episode: "What Remains"

=== Web series ===
Year	Title	Role	Notes
2014	Caper	Store clerk	Episode: "The British Guy"
2016	Scream: If I Die	Jake Fitzgerald	Episode: "I Hope You Live"
2017	Lifeline	Tom	Main role; 6 episodes
