= Kilmaru =

Anonymous video creator

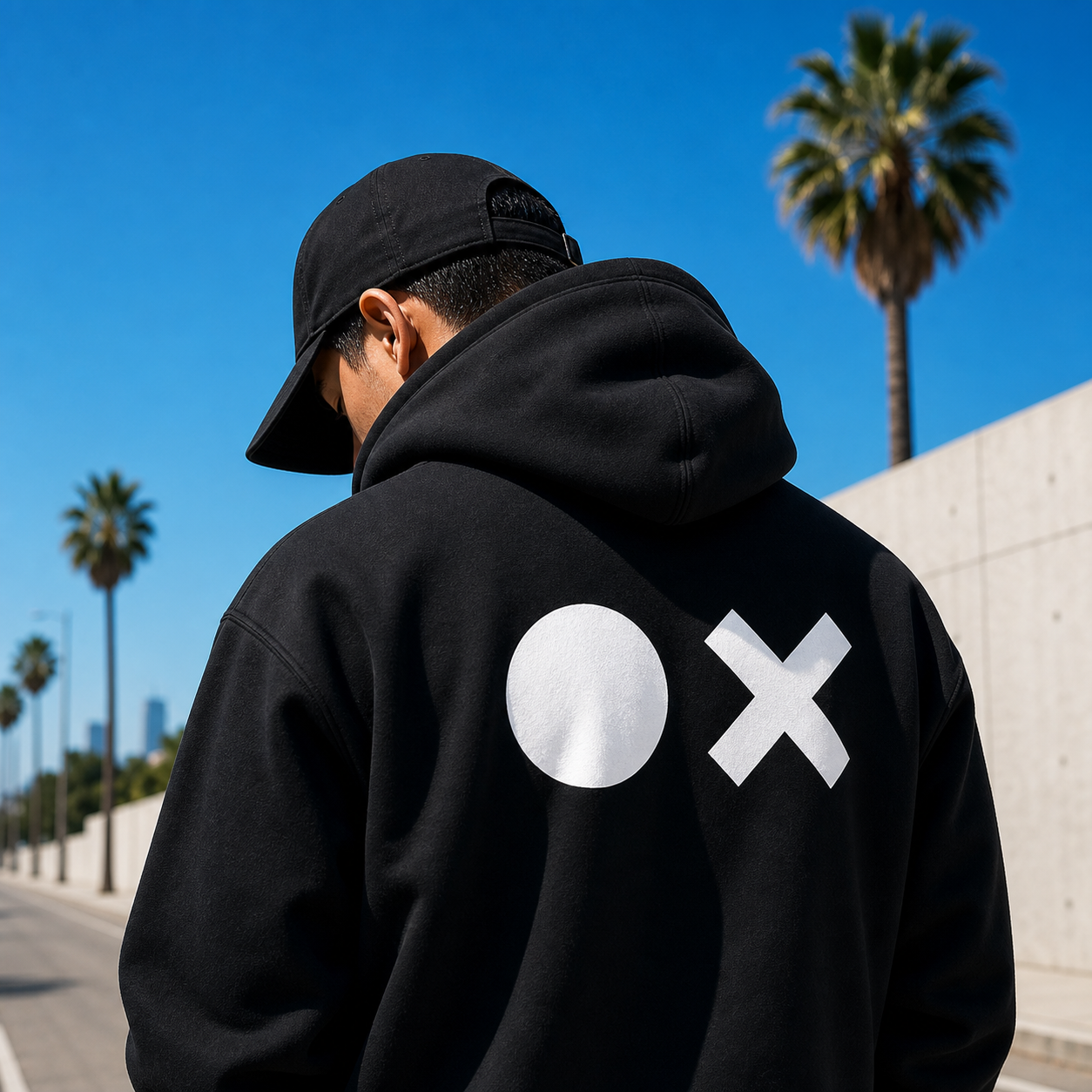
Kilmaru

Kilmaru is the pseudonym used by an anonymous video creator whose first-person videos depict famous cities and public locations as though no other people are present. The account started publishing videos on TikTok in 2021. The videos contain no dialogue, and the individual behind the camera never appears on screen.

== Videos ==
The earliest uploads featured deserted streets, supermarkets and a McDonald's restaurant. Later videos expanded to city centres including New York, London, Rome, Barcelona as well as the Vatican Museums and the Colosseum, each shown without any visible people. Other videos have shown Berlin, Tokyo, Florence and Pisa in broad daylight, with no pedestrians, no museum visitors, and no customers or employees visible inside shops. The locations are places that are usually busy, such as Piccadilly Circus and Times Square.

According to the narrative presented on the account, the narrator previously worked as a programmer of artificial intelligence systems and arrived in an uninhabited parallel world after hacking a quantum computer. In June 2021, a five-part series showed the narrator waking up aboard an abandoned cruise ship. Newsweek described the series as a continuation of the "empty world" videos, which had begun in March of that year.

== Production ==
The fact-checking website Snopes examined the cruise ship videos and concluded that they had been filmed under normal conditions before the other people were removed during post-production. Geopop reported the same process, describing the use of object-removal software similar to Google's Magic Eraser together with filming early in the morning, when fewer people are present and need to be removed. The visual effects channel Corridor Crew dedicated an episode of its VFX Artists React series to the videos.

== Recognition ==
During the 2021 Monaco Streaming Film Festival, the account received the Best Creative Content award. The winners were credited as the duo "Kilian and Maruta".
