= All Night (TV series) =

2018 American teen comedy TV series

- Genre: Teen comedy
- Created by: Jason Ubaldi
- Starring: Chris Avila; Brec Bassinger; Chanel Celaya; Ty Doran; Teala Dunn; Caleb Ray Gallegos; Allie Grant; Eva Gutowski; Tetona Jackson; Tom Maden; Jenn McAllister; Austin North; Tequan Richmond; Chester Rushing; Jake Short
- Composer: Jake Monaco
- Country of origin: United States
- Original language: English
- No. of seasons: 1
- No. of episodes: 10

Production
- Executive producers: Jordan Levin; Shelley Zimmerman; Brett Bouttier; Joe Davola; Brian Dannelly; Jason Ubaldi
- Producers: Brin Lukens; Scott Levine
- Cinematography: Carlos González
- Camera setup: Single-camera
- Running time: 22–24 minutes
- Production company: AwesomenessTV

Original release
- Network: Hulu
- Release: May 11, 2018

All Night is an American teen comedy television series created by Jason Ubaldi that premiered on May 11, 2018, on Hulu. The series stars a large ensemble of actors including Chris Avila, Brec Bassinger, Chanel Celaya, Ty Doran, Teala Dunn, Allie Grant, Caleb Ray Gallegos, and Eva Gutowski. The series is executive produced by Ubaldi, Brian Dannelly, Shelley Zimmerman, Jordan Levin, Brett Bouttier, and Joe Davola.

== Premise ==
All Night takes place on "an overnight, lock-in graduation party in which a group of new grads will do whatever it takes to make their remaining high school dreams come true. A night filled with sex, drugs, and other illegal paraphernalia."

== Cast and characters ==
=== Main ===
- Chris Avila as Stymie
- Brec Bassinger as Veronica "Roni" Sweetzer
- Chanel Celaya as Stefania
- Ty Doran as Bryce
- Teala Dunn as Alexis
- Caleb Ray Gallegos as Jonas
- Allie Grant as Melinda Weems
- Eva Gutowski as Lyssee Haversham
- Tetona Jackson as Cassie Fullner
- Tom Maden as Nino Clemente
- Jenn McAllister as Deanna Hoffman
- Austin North as Oz
- Tequan Richmond as Christian Fullner
- Chester Rushing as Cody
- Jake Short as Fig Figueroa

=== Recurring ===
- Kate Flannery as Principal Saperstein
- Chance Sutton as Drunk Bernie
- Dawan Owens as Coach Lewis
- Gus Kamp as Gerald Gene Bottom Jr.
- Noureen DeWulf as Mrs. Lewis
- Miles McKenna as Justin
- Alex Peavey as Seb

=== Guest ===
- Briana Lane as Psychic Cindy ("Tarot Cards")
- Jacob Davich as Guy ("Sink or Swim")

== Episodes ==
No.	Title	Directed by	Written by	Original release date
1	"Pilot"	Brian Dannelly	Jason Ubaldi	May 11, 2018
The recent graduates at Sherman Grove High find themselves in an all night graduation lock-in party, where the graduates make a pact to fulfill a high school dream of theirs before the sun comes up. However, a turn of events make this pact harder to achieve.
2	"Future Predictions"	Brian Dannelly	Jason Ubaldi	May 11, 2018
As an unexpected arrival comes to grad night, the students make a video diary of where they will be in 2038. Deanna makes it a mission to tell Fig her true feelings. Meanwhile Roni's friends reveal another reason why Oz may be pulling away.
3	"Karaoke"	Nancy Hower	Ali Schouten	May 11, 2018
4	"Midnight Madness"	Nancy Hower	Mackenzie Yeager	May 11, 2018
5	"Jello Wrestling"	Brian Dannelly	R. Lee Fleming, Jr.	May 11, 2018
6	"Sink or Swim"	Brian Dannelly	Jason Ubaldi	May 11, 2018
7	"Safe Sex"	Ryan Shiraki	Ali Schouten	May 11, 2018
8	"Tarot Cards"	Ryan Shiraki	Mackenzie Yeager	May 11, 2018
9	"The Darkness"	Brian Dannelly	R. Lee Fleming, Jr.	May 11, 2018
10	"Finale"	Brian Dannelly	Jason Ubaldi	May 11, 2018
With morning only hours away, the final minutes of grad night is ticking away, the recent graduates have one last chance to reunite and make critical decisions for their futures. Cassie and Deanna team up. Melinda makes a brave decision. Roni makes a difficult confession. A shocking video is leaked.

== Production ==
Teaser poster.

=== Development ===
On August 24, 2017, it was announced that Hulu had given the production a series order for a first season consisting of ten half-hour episodes. The series was created by Jason Ubaldi who is set to executive produce alongside Brian Dannelly, Shelley Zimmerman, Jordan Levin, Brett Bouttier, and Joe Davola. The series marks Hulu's second collaboration with AwesomenessTV after the 2016 series, Freakish. On April 22, 2018, it was announced that the series would premiere on May 11, 2018.

=== Casting ===
Alongside the initial series announcement, it was confirmed that show's large ensemble cast would include Chris Avila, Brec Bassinger, Chanel Celaya, Ty Doran, Teala Dunn, Allie Grant, Caleb Ray, Eva Gutowski, Tetona Jackson, Gus Kamp, Tom Maden, Jenn McAllister, Austin North, Tequan Richmond, Chester Rushing, Jake Short, Chance Sutton, Noureen DeWulf, Kate Flannery, and Dawan Owens.

== Release ==
=== Marketing ===
On April 11, 2018, the first teaser trailer for the series was released. On May 4, 2018, the official trailer was released.

=== Premiere ===
On May 10, 2018, the series held its official premiere at Awesomeness HQ in Los Angeles, California.

== Reception ==
In a mixed review, Robert Lloyd of the Los Angeles Times said, "Too long by half, awkward and obvious but not unlikable, the series is a cocktail mixed from stock characters and situations and whatever could be found in the folks' liquor cabinet the weekend they were away. You are free to interpret its allusiveness as intentional homage or as copying off one's neighbor's work. And of course, there is a portion of the hoped-for audience that will not be familiar with the many things that this is like, and a portion that will greet its familiar elements like old beloved friends." In another mixed review, Decider's Lea Palmieri recommended that viewers "skip" the series saying, "It might be hard to place yourself back in a time where the summer before you head off to college was the biggest hurdle in the world, and while it's not a frivolous concern for many, it's not quite enough of a hook to draw you in or make you care about the stakes at play, considering, you know, all the other stuff going on in 2018. In that sense, it is a fun escape viewing that doesn't really run the risk of making you feel overly emotionally attached to anyone or anything taking place."
