= Code of Honor (2016 film) =

2016 film by Michael Winnick

- DVD cover
- Directed by: Michael Winnick
- Written by: Michael Winnick
- Starring: Steven Seagal
- Cinematography: Anthony Rickert-Epstein
- Edited by: Michael Winnick
- Music by: Michael John Mollo
- Production company: Code of Honor Productions
- Distributed by: Grindstone Entertainment Group
- Release date: May 6, 2016
- Running time: 106 minutes
- Country: United States
- Language: English
- Budget: $8 million

Code of Honor is a 2016 American action thriller film written, produced, edited, and directed by Michael Winnick. The film stars Steven Seagal and Craig Sheffer and was released to video on demand on May 6, 2016.

== Plot ==
The film starts with members of white supremacist, Polynesian, and Latino gangs being gunned down as they meet for the sale of cocaine, killing a dozen. The killer, Colonel Robert Sikes, is a stealthy, one-man assault team who takes on a city's street gangs, mobsters, and corrupt politicians until his mission is complete. His former protégé, William Porter, teams up with the local police department to bring his former commander to justice and prevent him from further vigilantism.

== Cast ==
- Steven Seagal as Colonel Robert Sikes
- Craig Sheffer as Major William Porter
- Helena Mattsson as Keri Green, Stripper
- Louis Mandylor as Detective James Peterson
- James Russo as Vincent Romano, Mobster
- Griff Furst as Jerry Simon, Reporter
- Rafael Petardi as Carlos, Romano's Ally
- Michael Flynn as Captain Connely
- R.D. Call as Mayor Randolf
- Scott Takeda as Johnny Ito

== Production ==
Writer-director Michael Winnik said he wanted to make "First Blood meets Death Wish." Seagal liked the script and an earlier film of Winnik's, Guns, Girls and Gambling, and agreed to make the film.

The film was shot in Utah in March 2015 on a budget of $8 million. The shooting schedule was 20 days.

Winnik said of Seagal, "he's definitely the real deal... he really knows his guns, his Aikido, his martial arts, his fighting skills. You know, he's teaching you weapons, he's teaching you moves. He’s been around a long time, but his arms, his hands, they’re still lightning fast."

In the movie, Seagal's character dies. Winnik says the actor was not pleased with this and "if you ask him, he didn't [die]. He escaped. That said, the implication, the way the film is structured, is that he does. Obviously you can interpret it as you wish, but yes, he does go down. And that’s kind of what he’s been saying throughout the film. 'Would you give your life to save the world if no one knew you did it?' is the question he keeps posing. He's completed his mission and he's even made the other character take the fall for it."

== Reception ==
The film received negative reviews from critics. In a review for the Los Angeles Times, Robert Abele called it "dreadful" and "laughably awful". Frank Scheck wrote in The Hollywood Reporter that the film includes almost every B-action cliché, and stated that "the latest effort from the bloated, aging star is [...] as bland as its title."
