= Oleg Zagorodnii =

Ukrainian actor

- Олег Загородній
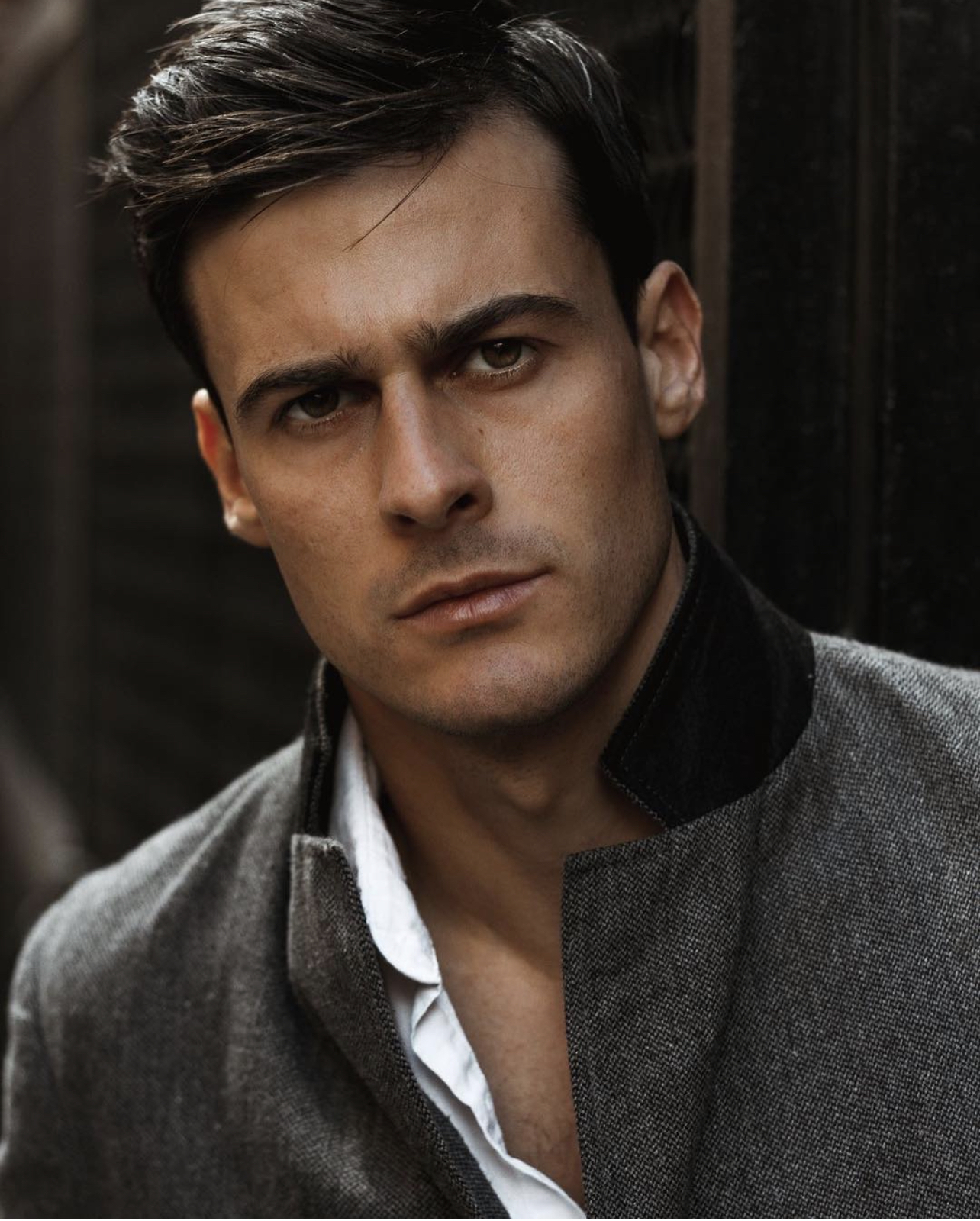
- Born: 27 October 1987 (age 39); Kyiv, Soviet Ukraine
- Occupation: Actor

Oleg Zagorodnii (Ukrainian: Олег Загородній; born 27 October 1987) is a Ukrainian actor, best known for the 2021 gay romantic war drama film Firebird.

== Biography ==
Oleg Zagorodnii was born on 27 October 1987 in Kyiv, Soviet Ukraine. He studied at the Kyiv National I. K. Karpenko-Kary Theatre, Cinema and Television University, from where he graduated in 2010. After that, he started to work at the Lesya Ukrainka National Academic Theater of Russian Drama.

In 2012, Zagorodnii decided to move to Russia and there he began to work at the acclaimed Gogol Center in Moscow.

In 2021, Zagorodnii starred in Firebird as Roman Matvejev, a fighter pilot of the Soviet Air Force who falls in love with private Sergey Serebrennikov (Tom Prior) during the active time of the Cold War in the 1970s. The film received backlash in Russia for "shaming Moscow".

In 2022, after the Russian invasion of Ukraine, Zagorodnii launched a military-style fashion brand called Brave+1 to use its profits and donations to make military uniforms for Ukrainian soldiers.

== Filmography ==
Key
†	Denotes films that have not yet been released

Year	Title	Role	Notes
2012	Dzhamayka	Tolik	TV series (1 episode)
2012	Pyrih		Short; as Oleh Zahorodniy
2012	Almost Love		Short; as Oleh Zahorodniy
2013	Oboroten v pogonakh	Dima Kolesnikov	
2016	The Choice	The Guy	Short
2018	Raduga v podnebes'ye	Vadim	TV mini series
2018	Who Are You?		TV mini series
2019	Vskrytiye pokazhet		TV series (1 episode)
2021	Plennista		TV series
2021	Firebird	Roman Matvejev	Lead role
2021	Living with Nadiya		TV mini series
2021	Hold Me		Short
2021	You can trust me	Maksim	TV mini series
2024	The Mafia Boss		TV mini series
2026	Untouched Scent	Den Howard	
2026	Last Kiss in Paris †	Lexus	Completed
2026	Pidmina †		TV series
