= Pascal Franchot =

American film producer

- Born: June 21, 1962 (age 64); Los Angeles
- Education: American University of Paris; Parsons School of Design; Ithaca College
- Occupations: producer director
- Title: owner & CEO of Fastback Pictures

Pascal Franchot is an American film and television producer and director.

== Personal life ==
Franchot was born in Los Angeles on June 21, 1962, the son of actress Jill Andre Franchot and filmmaker Richard Franchot. He grew up in Los Angeles with his father and moved to New York City with his mother where she acted in Broadway theater.

== Education ==
Franchot studied at the American University of Paris and Parsons School of Design before graduating from Ithaca College with a degree in Film and a minor in Photography. Upon graduating, Franchot started directing commercials and music videos for MTV and VH1. Pascal then went on to direct his first feature, the horror film, Milo.

== Career ==
Franchot segued into TV as a writer, director and producer on the Discovery series Unsolved History, on which he worked for several years. He has directed and produced several series pilots, three of which have gone to series for the networks Bravo, Discovery, Nickelodeon and CMT. Pascal has delivered programming for networks and cable channels including ABC-TV, Bravo, CNN, History Channel, and the Fox network. In 2011 Franchot won a Peabody Award as a producer of the CNN Heroes All-Star Tribute show.

In 2008, Franchot produced the feature film Gardens of the Night starring Gillian Jacobs, Evan Ross, Tom Arnold and John Malkovich; this project premièred at the Berlin Film Festival and won The International Critics' prize at the Deauville American Film Festival. In 2010, Franchot directed and produced the teen drama/thriller Triple Dog, starring Britt Robertson, Scout-Taylor Compton and Nolan Funk.

Franchot is the owner and CEO of Fastback Pictures which produces film and TV projects.
