= Hungry Hills =

- Directed by: Rob W. King
- Written by: Gary Fisher
- Based on: Hungry Hills by George Ryga
- Produced by: Rhonda Baker; Avi Federgreen; Gary Fisher; Rob W. King
- Starring: Keir Gilchrist; Alexia Fast; John Pyper-Ferguson; Gabrielle Rose
- Cinematography: Ken Krawczyk
- Edited by: Jackie Dzuba
- Music by: Todd Bryanton
- Release date: September 16, 2009 (Toronto)
- Running time: 92 minutes
- Country: Canada
- Language: English

Hungry Hills is a 2009 Canadian Western drama film starring Keir Gilchrist, Alexander De Jorday, Alexia Fast, John Pyper-Ferguson and Gabrielle Rose. It is based on the novel of the same name by George Ryga.

== Cast ==
- Keir Gilchrist as Snit Mandolin
- Alexander De Jordy as Johnny Swift
- John Pyper-Ferguson as Ray Kane
- Gabrielle Rose as Aunt Matilda
- Alexia Fast as Robin
- Cavan Cunningham as Lewis Whittles
- Graham Chabot as Donny
- Leo Fafard as Bootlegger
