= Blood on the Crown =

- Film poster featuring former title
- Directed by: Davide Ferrario
- Written by: Jean-Pierre Magro
- Produced by: Jean-Pierre Magro; Pedja Miletic; Aaron Briffa
- Starring: Harvey Keitel; Malcolm McDowell; Tom Prior
- Distributed by: Electric Entertainment
- Release date: March 9, 2021
- Countries: United States; Canada; Malta
- Languages: English; Maltese

Blood on the Crown (formerly titled Storbju and Just Noise) is a 2021 Maltese-Canadian-American film directed by Davide Ferrario and starring Harvey Keitel, Malcolm McDowell, and Tom Prior. Roland Joffé served as an executive producer of the film. The film is based on the 1919's Sette Giugno (7 June) events.

The movie commemorates riots which occurred in the Crown Colony of Malta on 7 June 1919 over a cost-of-living crisis in the colony. British troops eventually managed to suppress the riots, killing four in the process. The riots and the British colonial government's response to them led to increased anti-colonial sentiments among the Maltese public, while Fascist Italy and ethnic Italians in the colony viewed the riots as an opportunity to promote Italian irredentism in Malta.

== Cast ==
- Harvey Keitel
- Malcolm McDowell
- Tom Prior

== Release ==
The film was released on demand on March 9, 2021.
