= Helena Mattsson =

Swedish actress (born 1984)

- Mattsson at the Cinequest Film Festival in 2026
- Born: March 30, 1984 (age 42); Stockholm, Sweden
- Occupation: Actress
- Years active: 2001–present
- Relatives: Sofia Mattsson (sister)

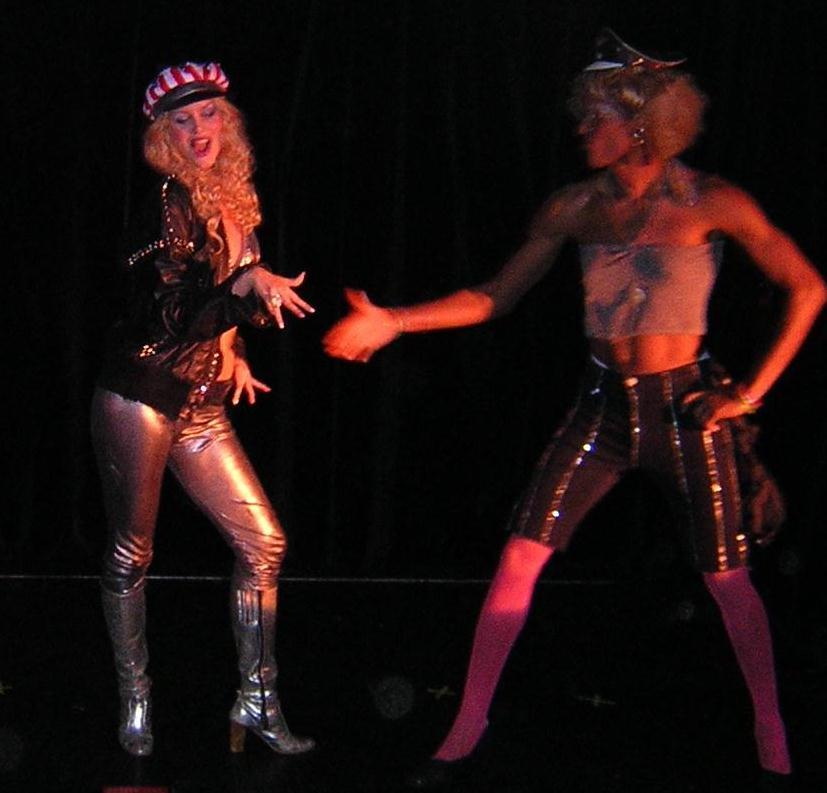
Mattsson (left) as Betty-Sue in Wild Side Story in Stockholm in 2002

Helena Mattsson (born March 30, 1984) is a Swedish actress. She began her career modeling and appearing in Swedish stage productions before moving to the United States. She starred in the 2007 science fiction action thriller film Species – The Awakening and later appeared in films You and I (2008), Surrogates (2009), and Guns, Girls and Gambling (2012). She went on to star in multiple television productions.

== Early life ==
Mattsson was born and raised in Stockholm, Sweden. Her younger sister, Sofia, is also an actress. She began acting and modeling at a young age, performing in plays, musicals and concerts. She studied acting at the Södra Latin upper secondary school in Södermalm, which she credits with giving her the confidence to pursue her chosen career. Mattsson had early roles in Wild Side Story and other cabarets in Stockholm. She moved to London, England, as a teenager to attend theatre school.

== Career ==
At age 19, Mattsson moved to Hollywood to audition for a TV series. Her planned short visit became permanent after she won a role for the unsold 2004 TV series pilot Sweden, Ohio. Mattsson's accent initially held her back: "When I started working, my thick Swedish accent lost me a lot of roles. A defining point in my career definitely came when I started to lose it. I was able to play more American roles at that point, and my career took a turn for the better." At the same time, Mattsson made her screen debut appearing in the Swedish slasher film, Drowning Ghost, and later guest-starred on American television shows CSI: NY, CSI: Crime Scene Investigation and Cold Case. Mattsson also appeared in the music video of Primal Scream's "Country Girl" in 2006.

In 2007, Mattsson starred in the science fiction action thriller film, Species: The Awakening, portraying Miranda, an alien/human hybrid. The following year she starred opposite Mischa Barton in the drama film You and I about Russian pop-band t.A.T.u. The film premiered at the Cannes Film Festival in May 2008 and was released in the United States on 31 January 2012. In 2009 she co-starred in the science fiction action film, Surrogates. On television, Mattsson made guest appearances on Two and a Half Men, Rules of Engagement, Legend of the Seeker, NCIS: Los Angeles and The Mentalist. In 2010, she appeared in a minor role in the superhero film Iron Man 2 and had a recurring role in the ABC series Desperate Housewives as Irina Kosokov. She later had three episode-arc in the CW action series, Nikita, as Cassandra Ovechkin.

In 2012, Mattsson starred alongside Gary Oldman and Christian Slater in the action film, Guns, Girls and Gambling. Later that year, she had a series regular role in the ABC supernatural horror series, 666 Park Avenue. The series was canceled after a single season in 2013. She later had a recurring roles in the ABC series Betrayal in 2013, and Mistresses in 2014. Also in 2014, Mattsson appeared in two episodes of FX crime series, Fargo, and in 2015 played the female lead in the Hallmark Channel romantic comedy film, Win, Lose or Love. From 2015 to 2016 she had a recurring role in the FX horror series, American Horror Story: Hotel. She appeared in a beaver costume in a Nespresso television commercial titled "Training Day" that also featured Danny DeVito and George Clooney in 2016.

In 2016, Mattsson starred alongside Reza Sixo Safai in the action crime film, The Loner, the film received positive reviews from critics. She later appeared in a number of direct-to-video releases, such as Code of Honor (2016) and Smartass (2017). In 2018, Mattsson played Swedish actress and model Britt Ekland in the HBO biographical drama film My Dinner with Hervé about Hervé Villechaize. Also that year, Mattsson starred alongside her younger sister Sofia in the Lifetime television thriller film My Husband's Secret Wife. She later appeared in several other Lifetime movies: The Perfect One (2018), Neighborhood Watch (2018), Her Deadly Reflections (2019), Swipe Right, Run Left (2019), and Murder in the Vineyard (2020). From 2021 to 2022, Mattsson had a recurring role in the ABC police drama series, The Rookie. In early 2022, she pinch-hit for Sofia in the role of Sasha Gilmore on the ABC daytime soap opera General Hospital.

== Personal life ==
Mattsson lives in Calabasas, California, is married and has two children who were 4 and 1 years old in January 2019.

== Filmography ==
=== Film ===
Year	Title	Role	Notes
2004	Drowning Ghost	Helena	
2006	Primal Scream: Country Girl	Girl	Video short
2007	Americanizing Shelley	Actress #2	
2007	Species: The Awakening	Miranda Hollander	Video
2007	Mrs. Right?	Beth	Video short
2008	Short Track	Lexi	
2009	Surrogates	JJ	
2009	Nobody	Lelle	
2010	Iron Man 2	Rebecca	
2010	Moomins and the Comet Chase	Snork Maiden (voice)	English version
2011	You and I	Kira	
2012	Melvin Smarty	Sylvia	
2012	The Babymakers	Tanya	
2012	Guns, Girls and Gambling	The Blonde / Annabelle	
2012	Seven Psychopaths	Blonde Lady	
2014	Audrey	Tess	
2016	The Persian Connection	Oksana	
2016	Code of Honor	Keri Green	
2017	Smartass	Henna	
2020	Iceland Is Best	Carla	
2021	Something About Her	Jackie	
2023	Dark Asset	Jane	
2024	Fight Pride	Anna	
TBA	Discussion Materials	Elizabeth Chandler	
TBA	Little Angels	Charli	

=== Television ===
Year	Title	Role	Notes
2004	Sweden, Ohio	Lena	TV pilot
2005	Sex, Love & Secrets	Alexis	"Danger"
2005	CSI: NY	Lauren Redgrave	"City of the Dolls"
2006	Kitchen Confidential	Beautiful Blonde	"An Affair to Remember"
2006	American Men	Anya	TV film
2007	CSI: Crime Scene Investigation	Rebecca 'Becca' Mayford	"Empty Eyes"
2007	Cold Case	Kateryna Yechenko	"Cargo"
2007	Rx	Jennifer	TV film
2007	CSI: Miami	Juliana Ravez	"Chain Reaction"
2008	Two and a Half Men	Ingrid	"Damn You, Eggs Benedict"
2009	Rules of Engagement	Martina	"Lyin' King"
2009	Legend of the Seeker	Salindra	"Wizard"
2010	Untitled Burr and Hart Project	Madigan	Unsold TV pilot
2010	NCIS: Los Angeles	Johanna	"Full Throttle"
2010	Desperate Housewives	Irina Kosokov	"Chromolume No. 7", "My Two Young Men", "We All Deserve to Die"
2010	The Defenders	Tawney	"Pilot"
2010	The Mentalist	Elsa Struven	"Red Hot"
2011	Detroit 1-8-7	Anna Gabov	"Key to the City"
2011	Breakout Kings	Heather Storrow	"One for the Money"
2011–12	Nikita	Cassandra Ovechkin	"Looking Glass", "London Calling", "Arising"
2012	Workaholics	Eve	"Good Mourning"
2012–13	666 Park Avenue	Alexis Blume	Main role
2013	Betrayal	Brandy Korskaya	Recurring role
2014	Fargo	Jemma Stalone	"The Heap", "A Fox, a Rabbit, and a Cabbage"
2014	Mistresses	Greta Jager	Guest role (4 episodes)
2015	Win, Lose or Love	Clara Goodwin	TV film
2015	Paradise Pictures	Isabelle Yates	TV film
2015–16	American Horror Story: Hotel	Agnetha	Recurring role (4 episodes)
2017	Jeff & Some Aliens	Inga (voice)	Main role
2017	Adventure Time	Alva (voice)	"Islands Part 3: Mysterious Island"
2018	My Dinner with Hervé	Britt Ekland	TV film (HBO)
2018	My Husband's Secret Wife	Avery	TV film (Lifetime)
2019	Mommy Group Murder	Grace	TV film (Lifetime)
2019	His Deadly Affair	Danielle	TV film
2020	Shattered Memories	Kelley Moore	TV film (Lifetime)
2021	Tacoma FD	Ulsa	"Eddie's Exes"
2022	General Hospital	Sasha Gilmore	Guest role (2 episodes); pinch-hit for Sofia Mattsson
2021-22	The Rookie	Ashley McGrady	Recurring role (5 episodes)
2024	Twilight of the Gods	Angrboda (voice)	Episode: "The Scapegoat God"
