= Grace Van Pelt =

Grace Van Pelt Rigsby
- The Mentalist character
- Amanda Righetti as Grace Van Pelt Rigsby
- First appearance: "Pilot"
- Last appearance: "White Orchids"
- Created by: Bruno Heller
- Portrayed by: Amanda Righetti

In-universe information
- Gender: Female
- Title: Special Agent
- Occupation: Private Investigator; Former Agent for the California Bureau of Investigation
- Family: Amos Van Pelt (father; a football coach)
- Spouse: Agent Wayne Rigsby
- Significant others: Agent Wayne Rigsby (coworker; husband), Agent Craig O'Laughlin (fiancé, person that almost killed her; deceased)
- Children: Benjamin Rigsby (stepson); Maddie Rigsby (Daughter)
- Relatives: Yolanda (cousin; supposedly a psychic),
- Nationality: American

Grace Van Pelt Rigsby is a fictional character on the CBI crime drama The Mentalist, portrayed by Amanda Righetti. Van Pelt Rigsby is a former special agent in the fictionalized California Bureau of Investigation (CBI) who left to become a private investigator who runs her own agency with her husband, Wayne Rigsby.

== Character background ==
Born on April 4, 1983, Van Pelt is from a small farming town in Iowa. She tends to be overly sensitive at times, but is very intelligent. Van Pelt works with Rigsby and Cho most of the time, but occasionally works with Jane or Lisbon. She is the rookie of the team who is new to the job in the pilot episode. Grace's cousin is supposedly a psychic, causing her to sometimes argue with Jane about matters of faith. In the episode "Bloodshot", Jane makes a remark about Van Pelt's character, stating, "... you're deeply repressed and emotionally shut down... because of a trauma in your past that you've never spoken of to anyone... ever... even yourself..." which Van Pelt's facial expression seems to confirm. In the second episode, "Red Hair and Silver Tape", Jane uses Grace as bait to catch a killer who is murdering redheads, leading to her being in an uncomfortable situation with a suspect (although it is ultimately a different woman who is kidnapped by the killers, and saved by Lisbon).

In the season 2 episode "Throwing Fire", Van Pelt talks a woman out of suicide by describing the impact her sister's own suicide had on her. Later, when questioned by Rigsby, Van Pelt quickly claims, "That just came out. I don't have a sister."

== Relationship with Rigsby ==
Starting in season 2, a recurring subplot is Rigsby's infatuation with Van Pelt. She is first shown to return his feelings in "Red Scare". In the next episode, "Black Gold and Red Blood", Van Pelt and Rigsby seem to be dating and greet each other warmly at a crime scene. However, Rigsby reveals to Van Pelt that he thinks that Jane may know about their relationship. Later, in "Red Bulls", Van Pelt and Rigsby argue about him not wearing a bulletproof vest to canvass an apartment building. Van Pelt is shot multiple times in the chest while questioning a young woman but survives because she had a bulletproof vest on. While she is being loaded onto an ambulance, Rigsby tells her he loves her. Van Pelt slaps Rigsby, telling him he should wear a bulletproof vest next time.

In the episode "Bleeding Heart", she and Rigsby announce their relationship to the team. Lisbon initially says she will take action and report their relationship to the head of the CBI, but in the episode "Redline", she changes her mind and tells them to not have physical contact with each other while at the office.

In the episode "The Red Box", the new head of the CBI, Madeleine Hightower, discovers Van Pelt's relationship with Rigsby and informs Lisbon about it, but Lisbon pretends she didn't know.

In the episode "Aingavite Baa", Hightower gives Van Pelt and Rigsby an ultimatum. They can either be in a relationship and have one of them leave the unit or end the relationship. As they walk out of Hightower's office, they state they love each other. Rigsby, after being in a shootout, tells Van Pelt he will get another job for them to be together. At the end of the episode, Grace ends the relationship by saying she doesn't want that responsibility. Rigsby pleads with her to talk it through but she says she knows herself and walks away, leaving him heartbroken. She is later seen walking into the elevator at the office, crying and sobbing.

In the third season, Van Pelt dates FBI agent Craig O'Laughlin, much to Rigsby's displeasure. Van Pelt and O'Laughlin get engaged in the episode Blood for Blood, stunning Rigsby, who still loves her. In "Like a Redheaded Stepchild," she invites Rigsby to the wedding, but he refuses the invitation, stating he still loves her and cannot watch her marry another man. However, he helps them get the area they want for their wedding. In "Strawberries and Cream", O'Laughlin is revealed to be a mole for Red John. Van Pelt tells him he was a suspect after another agent became the main suspect, allowing Red John to find out their plan. Grace is shocked by his actions and more so when O'Laughlin makes it clear he never truly loved her. He is shot dead by Van Pelt and Hightower after he shoots and wounds Lisbon. Van Pelt cries over his body as O'Laughlin completes his dying act of ripping off the necklace he gave her.

During season four, she seems a little over the edge. In one episode, a man reacts badly to being arrested and slaps Van Pelt. Van Pelt then punches the man in the kidneys. In "My Bloody Valentine", the necklace O'Laughlin gave Grace is returned to her. The necklace makes her anxious to the point that Lisbon asks if she wants her to take it away. During the remainder of the episode, Grace has visions of Craig. She and Jane then talk about the situation. In another episode, two other agents are threatened and without hesitation, she sneaks up behind the man and shoots him. She starts going to therapy towards the beginning of the season, but it is presumed she no longer is. Her fellow agents all express concern for her, but she insists she's fine.

During season 5, she is shown to still be close to Rigsby, hugging him when his father dies. In the episode "Red in Tooth and Claw", Van Pelt asks Lisbon if she can take an intensive computer course which will require her to be gone for some time. Lisbon approaches Bertram, who originally says no to the request, but later changes his mind and authorizes the course (during which actress Amanda Righetti was actually on maternity leave).

While Van Pelt is away at the computer intensive, Rigsby is shown to still have very strong feelings for her. In the episode "Red Velvet Cupcakes", Van Pelt and Rigsby go undercover as a couple with relationship problems. After the case is closed, they get back together. In "Wedding in Red", Rigsby proposes to her and she accepts; they are married later in the same episode.

In the episode "My Blue Heaven", it is revealed that Rigsby and Van Pelt have a daughter named Maddy.

== Relationship with the team ==
Van Pelt is well liked by the rest of the team; Lisbon even lets Grace take the lead on one interview, despite the fact that she is still a rookie. She always refers to Lisbon as "Boss" or "the boss", even when Teresa isn't around. In another episode, Grace is shot (while wearing a kevlar vest) and is taken to the hospital. Just before she gets into the ambulance, Lisbon is visibly upset and tells Grace sweetly: "Don't you do that to me again", indicating her fondness for her. In the opening of season four, Lisbon addresses Grace as her friend while encouraging her to get help. Jane appears to have a fondness for Grace, as much as she does for him; theirs appears to be like a sibling relationship, and Jane tends to favor her over Cho and Rigsby. It has been shown that Jane enjoys messing with Grace. He offers Grace more support than most people, but they tend to clash over spiritual issues such as the after-life. She seems to enjoy working with Cho; she is open with him and considers him a friend, although she doesn't always appreciate his straightforward manner.
