= The Ninth Passenger =

- Directed by: Corey Large
- Written by: Corey Large; Steven M. Albert
- Produced by: Corey Large
- Starring: Jesse Metcalfe; Alexia Fast; Tom Maden; Corey Large
- Cinematography: Thomas Billingsley
- Edited by: Markus Rutledge
- Music by: Scott Glasgow
- Production company: 308 Enterprises
- Distributed by: Grindstone Entertainment Group
- Release date: August 21, 2018
- Running time: 93 minutes
- Country: United States
- Language: English

The Ninth Passenger is a 2018 American horror-thriller film directed by Corey Large, who also stars along with Jesse Metcalfe, Alexia Fast, and Tom Maden.

Shot in Vancouver, Canada, the film was released in August 2018. The film follows a group of people aboard a luxury yacht on a spontaneous midnight sea voyage, pursued by an unknown passenger.

== Cast ==
- Jesse Metcalfe as Brady
- Alexia Fast as Jess
- Veronica Dunne as Christy
- Tom Maden as Lance
- Sabina Gadecki as Tina
- Corey Large as Malcolm
- David Hennessey as Marty
- Cinta Laura Kiehl as Nicole
- Timothy V. Murphy as Silas
- Selwa Dahab as Becky
- Roy Campsall as The Creature
