= Lifeline (2017 TV series) =

- Genre: Science fiction
- Created by: Benjamin Freiburger; Grant Wheeler
- Directed by: Sam Gorski; Niko Pueringer
- Starring: Zach Gilford; Sydney Park; Amanda Crew; Usman Ally; Sunkrish Bala; Lilan Bowden; Russell Pitts; Tom Maden; Daryl Mitchell; Vincent Ventresca; Linden Ashby; Christian Clemenson; Eden Estrella; Charles Malik Whitfield; Michael Patrick McGill; Dee Wallace
- Composer: Michael Tuller
- Original language: English
- No. of seasons: 1
- No. of episodes: 8

Production
- Executive producers: Dwayne Johnson; Dany Garcia; Dan Weinstein; Amee Dolleman; Gary Binkow; Michael Schreiber; Brian Gewirtz; Hiram Garcia; Keith Samples
- Producers: Zach Gilford; Andrew Reyes; Jude S Walko
- Running time: 22–26 minutes
- Production companies: Seven Bucks Productions; Studio71; Corridor Digital

Original release
- Network: YouTube Red
- Release: October 11 – November 8, 2017

Lifeline is an American science fiction drama television series distributed on YouTube Red which began October 11, 2017. It starred Zach Gilford and Sydney Park. Created by screenwriters Benjamin Freiburger and Grant Wheeler, the show tells the tale of an insurance agency that uses time travel to prevent the deaths of their clients. After the company's best agent, Conner Hooks, accidentally causes his wife's death during a save-gone-bad, he attempts to find her killer while searching for a way to travel back in time and reverse history.

The first season consisted of eight episodes. On June 4, 2018, creator Benjamin Freiburger confirmed on his Twitter account that the series would not return for a second season.

== Episodes ==
No.	Title	Directed by	Written by	Original release date
1	"In 33 Days You'll Die"	Sam Gorski & Niko Pueringer	Ben Freiburger & Grant Wheeler	October 11, 2017
Lifeline is a service that is purported as an insurance company that monitors and tracks its clients by a tracker implant to prevent deaths from happening, but does not reveal that it uses time travel called "jumps" to accomplish their goals. Agent Connor Hooks received a phone call challenging him to save the life of his wife and coworker Haley Hooks, which her jump was sabotaged and resulted in injuring Porter Booth, a drug dealer; the death of Haley, and Norah's father, a parking lot attendant. The episode ends with agents wiping Norah's memory and sedating Connor.
2	"There's A Chip In Her Arm"	Sam Gorski	Ben Freiburger & Grant Wheeler	October 11, 2017
Connor is briefly fired, but reinstated after convincing Nathan, the company's owner, that he will not use company resources to avenge Haley's death. Meanwhile, "Skinny", the person who killed Haley, stole Porter's money and left a severely wounded Porter to die as he starts a new life. As Norah is released from the hospital, she is placed into the custody of foster parents, with an extremely abusive and controlling stepfather. Connor implants a tracker into Norah and modifies it to solely alert Jay's computer. Norah escapes from the house after an altercation 6 years later.
3	"Norah is Going to Die"	Niko Pueringer	Ben Freiburger & Grant Wheeler	October 11, 2017
Norah finds herself on the street, but joins a group of teens living in an abandoned warehouse and starts a relationship with Tom. Skinny is revealed to have started a new life, having bought a house and paying Harry to create false identification, which was almost botched during a traffic stop. After Tom convinces Norah that he can assassinate people, they show up at her foster parents' house with the intent of killing her stepfather, but she could not bring herself to do so. She then goes back to her old apartment to drink while balancing herself on the rooftop, but her imminent death warns Jay, who dispatches Connor to save her. Jack, who sabotaged Haley's interception, instructs her to spy on an agent making a jump to make her aware of Lifeline's activities after her memory of Connor's rescue and past encounters with him were erased.
4	"He Killed My Wife"	Sam Gorski	Ben Freiburger & Grant Wheeler	October 11, 2017
After Jay discovers how to go backwards in time, Nathan dismissed the idea due to conflict of interest and even locked Jay out of certain parts of the building; however, this only prompts Jay to want to create his own time machine. Meanwhile, Jack instructs Norah to sabotage a jump attempt, only to be knocked out. Jasmine attempts to start a relationship with Connor, only to discover Connor not only has not given up on avenging Haley after 6 years (which as Connor performed many jump missions, his sense of time passing is drastically shorter), but Connor paid Harry to track down Skinny, who acted as a double agent and arranges for them to meet. Skinny attempts to apologize for Haley's death, but Connor starts a fight and Skinny manages to escape with Harry's help.
5	"Face to Face With Her Killer"	Niko Pueringer	Ben Freiburger & Grant Wheeler	October 18, 2017
Connor and Skinny reach an equilibrium when Connor realizes that he cannot turn to the authorities for help since Nathan paid them off, and for the safety of his family, Skinny calls and deludes Connor into thinking that he is leaving to a foreign country, threatening to kill him if retaliates any further. Jay sneaks into the jump room and begins taking photos and notes of the time machine's circuitry, then begins to build and test a prototype of it inside a warehouse. Jack calls Norah and offers her money to attempt to sabotage another jump attempt; not only was the agent stalled long enough to prevent him from successfully rescuing the client, the agent himself was injured, which Norah has a guilty conscience about accepting the money and runs off.
6	"Killing Me Won't Stop Me"	Sam Gorski	Ben Freiburger & Grant Wheeler	October 25, 2017
Nathan discovers that Norah played a part in the recent sabotage operations and that the time machine was rigged to send signals to Jack, who is revealed to be a disgruntled former Lifeline agent. Norah is invited to Jack's apartment, who uses a wheelchair and whose face is scarred, presumably as the result of a botched jump. Jack reveals what Norah has also deduced: He intends to restore the natural order of events instead of having Lifeline intervene, and explains that the "memory loss" she experienced were attempts to wipe her memory and blamed her father's death on Lifeline itself. Soon, Nathan teleports into the room kills Jack as he warns Nathan that killing him will not prevent future sabotage attempts. Meanwhile, Connor and Jay are testing their time machine prototype, but it did not work as intended.
7	"Playing God"	Niko Pueringer	Ben Freiburger & Grant Wheeler	November 1, 2017
Norah realizes the only way she can ever confront Conner about her father's death is to die herself, forcing him into a test that could cost one of them their life.
8	"Conner Goes Red"	Sam Gorski & Niko Pueringer	Ben Freiburger, Grant Wheeler	November 8, 2017
Conner makes the decision to finally live forward by jumping back to save Norah, even if this destroys any chance of saving Haley. But the jump back to Norah leaves two Conners on the same timeline, with wide-reaching repercussions that will change all their lives.

== Awards and nominations ==
Year	Award	Category	Nominee(s)	Result	Ref.
2018	8th Streamy Awards	Overall – Action or Sci-Fi	Lifeline	Nominated	
