= Rafael Petardi =

Canadian-American film and television actor

- Citizenship: Canada, United States
- Occupation: Actor
- Years active: 1990–present

Rafael Petardi is a Canadian-American film and television actor.

== Career ==
Petardi's first major role was in a mini series alongside Québécois stars Remy Girard, Gildor Roy, Michel Barette, Patrick Labbe and Chantal Fontaine. He has also starred in many television shows such as La Vie and Rent-a-Goalie, the latter garnering him 3 Gemini Award Nominations. He performed in films such as Rub & Tug, which was presented at the Toronto International Film Festival.

He has appeared in film and television roles such as ABC’s Flash Forward, CBS’ The Unit, supporting roles in films such as Beverly Hills Chihuahua, and Angels & Demons. Most recently Petardi guest starred on NCIS: Los Angeles. He now voices Chase Devineaux in Carmen Sandiego.

== Filmography ==
Year	Title	Role	Notes
2000	Waking the Dead	One of the Kids Who Mug Fielding #1	
2000	Rats and Rabbits	Super-Mario	
2001	Tart	New Doorman	
2001	Protection	NY Waiter	
2002	Rub & Tug	Bob	
2006	The Little Book of Revenge	Vendeur #3	
2007	Jack Brooks: Monster Slayer	Janitor	
2008	Beverly Hills Chihuahua	Dog #1 (Carthay Hotel)	Voice
2009	Angels & Demons	Italian Reporter #2	
2014	Freezer	Vadim	
2016	Code of Honor	Carlos	
2018	Siberia	Pavel	
2021	Red Notice	Security Chief Ricci	

=== Television ===
Year	Title	Role	Notes
1997-2002	Earth: Final Conflict	Fratalli	1 episode
2000	Out of Sync	Karaoke Singer	TV movie
2003	Wild Card	Taavo	1 episode
2004	Missing	Dr. Eduardo Rojas	1 episode
2006-2008	Rent-A-Goalie	Shit Pants	23 episodes
2008	The Unit	Ortiz	1 episode
2010	Flash Forward	Agent Danforth Crowley	3 episodes
2010	NCIS: Los Angeles	Vakar	1 episode
2018	72 Hours	Luc Gagne	S.1, Ep.7 Double Cross
2019	Carmen Sandiego	Chase Devineaux; Boat Captain	26 episodes
2019	The Lion Guard	Tangaagim	1 episode

=== Video games ===
Year	Title	Role	Notes
2020	Call of Duty: Black Ops Cold War	Anton Volkov	
2021	Ratchet & Clank: Rift Apart	Pierre	
2021	Call of Duty: Vanguard	Additional Voices	
2023	Starfield	Kosmos Bakas, Tomisar Kadac	
2023	Call of Duty: Modern Warfare III	Additional Voices	
