= Firebird (film) =

2021 film by Peeter Rebane

- Theatrical release poster
- Directed by: Peeter Rebane
- Screenplay by: Peeter Rebane; Tom Prior
- Based on: The Story of Roman; 1993 novel by Sergey Fetisov
- Produced by: Brigita Rozenbrika; Peeter Rebane; Tom Prior
- Starring: Tom Prior; Oleg Zagorodnii; Diana Pozharskaya
- Cinematography: Mait Mäekivi
- Edited by: Tambet Tasuja
- Music by: Krzysztof Aleksander Janczak
- Production companies: The Factory; No Reservations Entertainment; Film Estonia
- Distributed by: Roadside Attractions (United States)
- Release dates: 17 March 2021 (BFI Flare); 22 April 2022 (United Kingdom); 29 April 2022 (United States)
- Running time: 107 minutes
- Countries: United Kingdom; Estonia
- Language: English
- Box office: $238,487

Firebird is a 2021 romantic war drama film directed, co-written, and co-produced by Peeter Rebane (in his feature directorial debut), based on Sergey Fetisov's memoir The Story of Roman. The film stars Tom Prior (who also co-wrote and co-produced), Oleg Zagorodnii, and Diana Pozharskaya. Set in the Soviet Air Force during the Cold War, it tells the true story of forbidden love between a private and a fighter pilot.

Firebird had its world premiere at the 35th BFI Flare: London LGBTIQ+ Film Festival on 17 March 2021. The film also screened at the 45th Frameline: San Francisco International LGBTQ+ Film Festival on 27 June 2021, where it won an honorable mention for Best First Feature. The film had a limited theatrical release in the United States by Roadside Attractions on 29 April 2022.

== Plot ==
Sergey, a young private in the Soviet Air Force, has only a few weeks remaining in his military service. He and his friends bristle under the tight control of the military commanders. He appears to have a budding romance with Luisa, the secretary to the base commander, and he indulges in a photography hobby that is barely tolerated by his superiors. He's assigned to assist a new fighter pilot, Roman, when he arrives. An undeniable passion between them develops, despite the threat of imprisonment that hangs over homosexual romances under the Soviet regime. Nonetheless, they consummate their attraction to one another and are nearly found out by a KGB agent.

Roman encourages Sergey to study acting in Moscow instead of returning to his family's farm when he leaves the service. A year after Sergey leaves and finds a new life in the theater, he is invited to Roman and Luisa's wedding. He attends and barely contains his disappointment in Roman and continuing love for him.

Roman and Luisa have a child together, but their marriage is a sham, and he continues to yearn for Sergey. Roman leaves his wife and son ostensibly to study in Moscow. He secretly rents an apartment with Sergey and they cohabit happily and take vacations together. However, Luisa and their son come to Moscow for Christmas and Roman and Sergey's love is revealed to her. She is enraged at both Roman and Sergey by this revelation and the two men must part.

Later, Roman is assigned to participate in the Soviet–Afghan War, where he is killed. After his death, Sergey visits Luisa, who is still very angry at him. He returns to his life as an actor in Moscow and is last seen watching a production of Igor Stravinsky's ballet, The Firebird, which Roman had introduced him to.

== Cast ==
- Tom Prior as Sergey Serebrennikov
- Oleg Zagorodnii as Roman Matvejev
- Diana Pozharskaya as Luisa
- Jake Thomas Henderson as Volodja
- Margus Prangel as Major Zverev
- Nicholas Woodeson as Colonel Kuznetsov
- Ester Kuntu as Masha
- Kaspar Velberg as Pilot Selenov
- Sergei Lavrentev as Drama Professor
- Rasmus Kaljujärv as Pilot
- Lauri Mäesepp as Pilot
- Karl-Andreas Kalmet as Pilot
- Vladimir Nadein as Young Conscript
- Markus Luik as Sergeant Janis

== Production ==
=== Development ===
Peeter Rebane first came across the story of Firebird in 2014 when Sergei Lavrentiev, film critic and actor, gave him a copy of The Story of Roman by Sergey Fetisov. Rebane collaborated with actor and screenwriter Tom Prior, who was previously in The Theory of Everything and Kingsman: The Secret Service. Rebane and Prior interviewed Fetisov before his death in 2017 to gain materials for the film's production.

=== Casting ===
Prior was first approached to play Sergey Serebrennikov before becoming involved in the writing process. Oleg Zagorodnii, a Ukrainian actor, was then cast to play the role of Roman Matvejev. Zagorodnii, who's been in a couple of Russian stage productions, was hesitant about taking on the role, citing his limited English.

While in Moscow, Rebane came across Diana Pozharskaya, a Russian actress and dancer, who he believed had the right energy to play the part. "Ninety percent of a director's job is casting," said Rebane. "If you cast the right personality, with the right energy for the role you are off to a good start."

== Release ==
The film had its world premiere at the 35th BFI Flare: London LGBTIQ+ Film Festival on 17 March 2021, screening as part of the Hearts strand. It also screened at the 43rd Moscow International Film Festival on 24 April 2021, the 45th Frameline: San Francisco International LGBTQ+ Film Festival on 27 June 2021, the 42nd Durban International Film Festival on 23 July 2021, and the 39th Outfest Los Angeles LGBTQ Film Festival on 21 August 2021. Its Asian premiere was held at the 32nd Hong Kong Lesbian & Gay Film Festival on 17 September 2021. On 22 February 2022, it was announced that the director Peeter Rebane had granted the film's distribution rights for the United States to Roadside Attractions, with its limited theatrical release on 29 April 2022.

== Reception ==
=== Critical reviews ===
On the review aggregator website Rotten Tomatoes, 57% of 49 critics' reviews are positive. The website's consensus reads: "Firebird's intentions are admirable, but they're largely thwarted by a frustratingly muted approach to its central love story." Metacritic, which uses a weighted average, assigned the film a score of 49 out of 100, based on 11 critics, indicating "mixed or average" reviews.

Randy Myers in his review for The Mercury News gave it a 3.5 stars and said it is "a glossy and classy melodrama that soars with passion and is elevated by strong production values, heartfelt performances and a story arc that journeys to unexpected destinations". In the Daily Mirror, Lewis Knight said that it "is not a revolutionary Queer romance by any means but it is a glossy love story with conviction and genuine historical tragedy." Leslie Felperin of The Guardian gave it a 3 out of 5 star and wrote that "it's a rather sad story" but "the dialogue is often more than a little stiff and there's something weirdly off", and "the film's exploration of love, courage and the price of speaking your truth is as timely as it's ever been, and for Russians particularly".

Cary Darling of Houston Chronicle gave it a 3/5 stars and described that "even though this beautifully shot and generally well-acted British-Estonian co-production is based on a memoir, it feels too PBS polite, as if the edges have been rubbed away from the real story to appeal to as wide an audience as possible". Dan Callahan wrote in TheWrap, "the dominant creative force is cinematographer Mait Mäekivi, who gives the blues and reds of the uniforms and the flags on display an early-Technicolor sort of gleam". Gary Goldstein's review for the Los Angeles Times proclaimed the "romance gets enough of an on-screen workout to feel sexy and authentic, though the characters seem to take a few too many lust-over-logic risks". Neil Minow of RogerEbert.com gave it a 3 out of 4 stars and proclaimed the film as "a swooningly romantic love story". IndieWire's Jude Dry graded the film a "B−" and described that "actors Prior and Zagorodnii are both so watchable, and their chemistry so electric, that it's easy to get swept away in their romance. Historical accuracy be damned".

In less favorable reviews, Ed Gonzalez gave it a 1.5 stars and wrote for Slant Magazine that the movie is suffocated by "clichés and then there are only clichés and Firebird is suffocated by them". Mark Keizer of The A.V. Club graded the film a "C", praising the lead actors' chemistry and beauty but found its melodramatic screenplay does the film "no favor". Guy Lodge of Variety wrote the film is "a tragic true story underpins director Peeter Rebane's earnest queer melodrama, but hoary symbolism and hokey scripting work against its authenticity" and "crushes so hard on its admittedly rapturous boy-meets-boy romance that it barely sketches out a bigger picture". The Hollywood Reporter's Sheri Linden stated that "there's so much potential heart and heartbreak in Firebird's tale of forbidden passion that the screenplay and the cautious pacing become frustrating; with every ache measured and spelled out, the film's dogged striving for poetry too often leaves it feeling disappointingly prosaic". In The New York Times, Teo Bugbee said that "it lacks spontaneity in its moment-to-moment execution" and "each line and image feels predetermined".

=== Awards and nominations ===
Award	Category	Recipient(s)	Result	Ref
Austin Gay & Lesbian International Film Festival	Feature Film	Peeter Rebane	Won	
Cleveland International Film Festival	George Gund III Memorial Central and Eastern European Film Competition	Peeter Rebane	Nominated	
FilmOut San Diego	Best Narrative Feature	Peeter Rebane,Tom Prior, Brigita Rozenbrika	Won	
FilmOut San Diego	Best Director	Peeter Rebane	Won	
FilmOut San Diego	Best Actor	Tom Prior	Won	
Frameline San Francisco International LGBTQ Film Festival	Best First Feature: Honorable Mention	Peeter Rebane	Won	
Frameline San Francisco International LGBTQ Film Festival	Outstanding First Feature Award	Peeter Rebane	Nominated	
Key West Film Festival	Best LGBTQ Film	Peeter Rebane	Won	
