= Freezer (film) =

- Film poster
- Directed by: Mikael Salomon
- Written by: Tom Doganoglu; Shane Weisfeld
- Produced by: Rhonda Baker; David Buelow
- Starring: Dylan McDermott; Yuliya Snigir; Peter Facinelli; Andrey Ivchenko; Pascal Petardi; David McNally; Markus Parilo; Milan Malisic
- Cinematography: John Dyer
- Edited by: Bridget Durnford
- Music by: David C. Williams
- Production company: Envision Media Arts
- Distributed by: Anchor Bay Entertainment; Eagle Films; Freestyle Releasing
- Release dates: January 17, 2014 (Los Angeles premiere); January 21, 2014 (DVD release)
- Running time: 82 minutes
- Country: United States
- Languages: English; Russian

Freezer is a 2014 American action thriller film directed by Mikael Salomon from a script by Tom Doganoglu and Shane Weisfeld with David C. Williams composed the film's score. The film stars Dylan McDermott, Yuliya Snigir and Peter Facinelli. This is an indie film that follows an everyday guy who finds himself tested beyond human endurance when he awakens to find himself locked in an industrial freezer by Russian thugs.

Freezer was released home Media and on demand on January 21, 2014 through Anchor Bay Entertainment.

== Plot ==
Robert Saunders (Dylan McDermott) wakes up to find himself bound and locked inside a meat locker. After he is able to cut himself loose, two Russian mobsters Kiril and Stepan enter the freezer to question him. It becomes apparent that neither understand English, but before they leave they tell a confused Robert they want "money". Left alone, Robert finds a ventilation duct in the top of the ceiling that appears to lead to the fans inside the locker. Just then, he finds a ringing cell phone on the floor and speaks with Detective Al Dorian, who first addresses him as "Sam". Robert explains that he was having dinner in a restaurant with his girlfriend for his birthday before being knocked unconscious and thrown into the freezer. Before Dorian can complete a trace, the mobsters return and destroy the phone. They are accompanied this time by the bilingual Alisa (Yuliya Snigir), who accuses Robert of having stolen $8 million from them and demands its return; otherwise, he will freeze to death within four hours. He tries to convince them that he is innocent and this is a case of mistaken identity, but the Russians are undeterred and take his shoes before leaving.

After finding bags to wrap his bare feet, Robert tries to keep his body temperature up by exercising. While running around the room, he knocks over some boxes revealing a seriously wounded Detective Sam Gurov lying in a shelf. Sam tells Robert that he will not be allowed to leave the locker alive regardless if he is able to convince the mobsters he is innocent. Before passing out, he confesses that he was an undercover cop trying to bring down the mobsters' boss, Oleg. Robert hides Sam again and begins attempting to stop the fans by beating them with a fire extinguisher.

The Russians return and again Alisa demands to know where the money is. Robert maintains his ignorance of the matter and evades her questions, but a groan from Sam alerts Kiril. Robert takes advantage of the situation by grabbing Alisa as Kiril threatens to kill Sam. Sam shatters Robert's innocence by telling them Robert took the money despite his protests. Robert deduces that Alisa was supposed to be in charge of the lost money and she begs Robert to confess if not to save himself, then to save her. After the Russians leave again, Sam explains that after a failed hit, Oleg began moving his vast fortune around for protection; during the shuffle, the $8 million was lost. Sam volunteers to change clothes with Robert and pose as him in order to allow Robert a chance at escape. The plan fails, and Robert, in a bid to save Sam's life, confesses that the money is hidden in the restaurant where he was abducted. Despite this, he is knocked out, and Sam is killed.

Upon waking up, Robert makes Alisa believe that Stepan is the real thief and Robert is being framed, since Stepan was responsible for both the death of Sam's informant and identifying Robert as the thief. Robert kills Kiril with a meat hook but is incapacitated by Stepan before he can escape. Alisa, now clearly shaken, tells Stepan that Robert accused him of taking the money. Enraged by Kiril's death, Stepan drags Alisa out of the freezer and locks Robert inside once again. After he puts on Kiril's clothes, he continues to search for but fails to find any way out of the meat locker. When Stepan and Alisa return, Robert convinces them to let him contact Detective Dorian because, as Sam's partner, he will know where the money is. Stepan impatiently ends the call and throws a bucket of water on Robert before leaving.

With hypothermia setting in, Robert again tries to disconnect the fan wires in ventilation shaft but is unable due to his state. At that time, a well-dressed and bound Russian man is thrown into the room with Robert. The man, introducing himself as Danil, offers to help Robert escape in exchange for a portion of the money. Robert instructs Danil to cut the electrical wires in the shaft, but when the mobsters enter the room, Danil is electrocuted to death. Alisa reveals that Danil was merely a plant to get the truth from Robert and was in fact Vadim, Oleg's son.

When Oleg arrives, he finds Robert and identifies him as the assassin who previously failed to kill him. Once Robert drops his claimed innocence and acknowledges the truth, he and Oleg fight as Alisa and Stepan look on. Due to his weakened state, Oleg gains the upper hand but is killed by Alisa before he can finish off Robert. Alisa is in fact Robert's girlfriend and had been working on the inside for him. A wounded Stepan escapes and locks the two inside. Robert uses the severed electrical wires to cause the metal meat rack to give off enough heat to warm their hands. At this time, Detective Dorian arrives and demands to know where the money is after instructing the two to bind their hands to the rack. Alisa confesses that the money has been inside the meat locker the entire time, hidden inside the boxes of cuts. While Dorian is distracted with this, Alisa and Robert escape by burning through the zip ties binding their wrists together on the heated rack.

Robert and Alisa use a semi-truck to hook up to the freezer with the money and Dorian inside. After traveling to a port, they load the container onto a cargo ship. Alisa gives Robert a "birthday present" from Oleg, a box of cuts holding a large amount of money. They drive off planning a warm vacation but not before knocking an injured Stepan into the bay.

== Cast ==
- Dylan McDermott as Robert Saunders
- Yuliya Snigir as Alisa
- Peter Facinelli as Detective Sam Gurov
- Andrey Ivchenko as Kirill
- Pascal Petardi as Vadim
- David McNally as Detective Al Dorian
- Markus Parilo as Oleg
- Milan Malisic as Stepan

== Reception ==
On Rotten Tomatoes the film has an approval rating of 33% based on reviews from 6 critics. On Metacritic it has a score of 40% based on reviews from 4 critics, indicating "mixed or average" reviews.

=== Home media ===
The film was released on Blu-ray, DVD, and as a combo pack on January 21, 2014.
