= Triple Dog =

- Promotional poster
- Directed by: Pascal Franchot
- Written by: Barbara Marshall
- Produced by: Thomas L. Carter; Mike Jackson; R. D. Robb; Pascal Franchot
- Starring: Britt Robertson; Alexia Fast; Scout Taylor-Compton; Janel Parrish
- Cinematography: George Campbell
- Edited by: Josh Rifkin
- Music by: Ian Honeyman
- Production companies: Helios Productions; Station 3; Fastback Pictures
- Distributed by: Gravitas Ventures
- Release date: September 21, 2010
- Running time: 92 minutes
- Country: Canada
- Language: English

Triple Dog is a 2010 Canadian drama thriller film directed by Pascal Franchot and written by Barbara Marshall. The film stars Britt Robertson, Alexia Fast, Scout Taylor-Compton, and Janel Parrish. It was released by Gravitas Ventures in the United States and Canada on September 21, 2010.

== Plot ==
Eve Spalding, a new girl in town, has her sweet sixteen birthday sleepover with her friends; catholic shy girl Sarah, student council president and popular girl Cicely, Nina whom is best friends with Cicely, a lonely girl Liza who carries a rat around, and troublemaker Chapin Wright.

Chapin is quickly bored at the party and tells the girls that they should play “triple dog” (a game of dares) and whoever doesn’t complete the dare shaves her head. First, Sarah is dared to run around the block, naked. Liza is dared to sit in Eve’s brother Todd’s closet until midnight (whom she bonds with and possibly hooks up with after he discovers her in his closet). Nina is dared to fake a seizure while singing karaoke at a bar. Cicely is dared to urinate on the principal’s doorstep. Chapin is dared to rob a convenience store owned by Cicely’s father. Eve is dared to have sex with Whisper (a guy friend of Chapin’s) at a party.

Throughout the movie, there’s been rumors about how a girl named Stacy St. Clair died from drowning after jumping off a bridge. Chapin also beats up Liza in study hall when she asks how Chapin got expelled from her old school as it involves Stacy’s death and Chapin refuses to talk about Stacy.

At the party, Eve attempts to hook up with Whisper but is rebuffed because he’s attracted to Chapin. A girl named Mallory tells Eve about Chapin’s involvement with Stacy’s death. They learn that Chapin and Mallory and Stacy were playing “triple dog” and Stacy was dared by Chapin to jump off the bridge.

Chapin learns that Mallory told them the truth and Chapin runs away to the bridge with her friends and some partygoers following her. Her friends beg her not to jump but Chapin jumps. Her friends fear that Chapin drowned to death after finding a shoe but Chapin survives and tells the truth about Stacy and she cries.

Later, while the girls regroup at a nearby park. Eve calls her father (after not hearing him call all night), her father tells her to never call him again and she gets angry. Eve tells Chapin to shave her head (since she didn’t do her dare). Chapin and the girls agree to remain friends. The girls head back to Eve’s for the night and Chapin skateboards home.

The film ends with Chapin visiting the bridge and places a kiss on Stacy’s shrine and overlooking the bridge.

== Cast ==
- Britt Robertson as Chapin Wright
- Scout Taylor-Compton as Liza
- Alexia Fast as Eve Spalding
- Janel Parrish as Cicely
- Carly McKillip as Nina
- Emily Tennant as Sarah
- Brett Davern as Whisper
- Nolan Gerard Funk as Todd Spalding
- Aubrey Mozino as Mallory
- Brian Markinson as Principal Scalco
- Julia Maxwell as Stacy St. Clair (flashbacks)
