= Iceland Is Best =

- Poster
- Directed by: Max Newsom
- Written by: Max Newsom
- Produced by: Will Randall-Coath; Dankuro Shinma; Max Newsom
- Starring: Kristin Sophusdottir; Helena Mattsson; Tom Maden; Atli Oskar Fjalarsson; Judd Nelson
- Release date: September 10, 2021
- Running time: 90 minutes
- Country: United Kingdom
- Language: English

Iceland Is Best is a 2021 British drama film written and directed by Max Newsom and starring Kristin Sophusdottir, Helena Mattsson, Tom Maden, Atli Oskar Fjalarsson and Judd Nelson.

== Plot ==
Sigga lives in a small village in rural Iceland. She wants to emigrate to California, but those around her want her to stay. She gets money for an airfare from her grandfather, and heads off in a van driven by one of her friends, accompanied by other friends. Along the way, they meet a handsome American. He steals Sigga's bag, so she has to go to a party to retrieve her bag. After further misadventures, they end up back home. Sigga's father realises she is determined to leave, so he drives her to the airport instead.

== Cast ==
- Judd Nelson as Mr. Sondquist
- Kristin Sophusdottir as Sigga
- Tom Maden as Nikki
- Helena Mattsson as Carla
- Tom Prior as Jack
- Alfrun Laufeyjardottir as Kata
- Atli Oskar Fjalarsson as Gunni
- Mikael Kaaber as Benni
- Jasmin Dufa Pitt as Pia
- Stefan Hallur Stefansson as Bjorn
- Arnar Jónsson as Grandfather
- Ragnheidur Steindorsdottir as Grandmother

== Release ==
The film was released in the United Kingdom on 10 September 2021.

== Reception ==
Phuong Le of The Guardian awarded the film two stars out of five.

Rich Cline of Shadows on the Wall awarded the film three stars out of five.
