= The Mentalist season 4 =

The Mentalist
- Season 4
- DVD cover
- No. of episodes: 24

Release
- Original network: CBS
- Original release: September 22, 2011 – May 17, 2012

Season chronology
- ← Previous; Season 3 Next → Season 5

The fourth season of the CBS police procedural series The Mentalist premiered on September 22, 2011 and concluded on May 17, 2012. The season picks up immediately after the events of the third-season finale in which Patrick Jane (Simon Baker) was arrested for the public murder of the man he believes is the notorious serial killer Red John, who murdered his wife and daughter. In the aftermath of a deadly confrontation, Jane faces trial and must rebuild his standing with the CBI after realizing Red John is still active. Determined to end the hunt, Jane pushes the limits of his psychological games and feigns an emotional breakdown to lure the elusive serial killer out of hiding.

== Cast ==
=== Main cast ===
- Simon Baker as Patrick Jane (24 episodes)
- Robin Tunney as Teresa Lisbon (24 episodes)
- Tim Kang as Kimball Cho (24 episodes)
- Owain Yeoman as Wayne Rigsby (24 episodes)
- Amanda Righetti as Grace Van Pelt (24 episodes)

=== Recurring cast ===
- Michael Rady as Luther Wainwright (9 episodes)
- Samaire Armstrong as Summer Edgecombe (7 episodes)
- Catherine Dent as Susan Darcy (6 episodes)
- Jillian Bach as Sarah Harrigan (4 episodes)
- Michael Gaston as Gale Bertram (2 episodes)
- Alicia Witt as Rosalind Harker (2 episodes)

=== Notable guest cast ===
- Reed Diamond as Ray Haffner ("Little Red Book")
- Pruitt Taylor Vince as J. J. LaRoche ("Little Red Book")
- Christian Camargo as Henry Tibbs (“Ring around The Rosie”)
- Henry Thomas as Tommy Lisbon ("Where in the World is Carmine O'Brien?")
- Missi Pyle as Karen Cross ("Blinking Red Light")
- David Paymer as James Panzer ("Blinking Red Light")
- Eric Winter as Craig O'Laughlin (ghost) ("My Bloody Valentine")
- Joaquim de Almeida as Gabriel Porchetto ("My Bloody Valentine")
- James Frain as Terry Murphy ("At First Blush")
- David Norona as Osvaldo Ardiles ("At First Blush")
- Morena Baccarin as Erica Flynn ("War of the Roses")
- Malcolm McDowell as Bret Stiles ("His Thoughts Were Red Thoughts")
- Vincent Martella as Martin Klubock ("Something's Rotten in Redmund")
- William R. Moses as Archie Bloom Sr. ("Ruby Slippers")
- Ray Wise as Dennis Victor ("Red Rover, Red Rover")
- Emmanuelle Chriqui as Lorelei Martins ("The Crimson Hat")

== Episodes ==
No. overall	No. in season	Title	Directed by	Written by	Original release date	Prod. code	U.S. viewers (millions)
71	1	"Scarlet Ribbons"	Charles Beeson	Bruno Heller	September 22, 2011	3X6801	13.56
Patrick Jane is detained for killing Timothy Carter (Bradley Whitford). Jane cannot prove Carter told him he was Red John, but believes Red John's gun, along with the record of a cell phone call from FBI Agent O'Laughlin, would prove otherwise, but Carter's phone shows no calls from O'Laughlin and no gun is found. D.A. Ardiles obeys CBI Director Bertram's instructions to keep Jane in prison, away from the media, getting bail set at $1 million. Bertram suspends Lisbon and her team. Jane thinks someone took Carter's gun and switched his phone and Cho, Van Pelt, Rigsby, and Lisbon agree to investigate. The mall's security footage shows three possible culprits - a waitress, a security guard, and a forensics tech. The security guard is found dead. Lisbon and Van Pelt visit Sally, Timothy Carter's wife of 3 years, who insists Tim was a good man; he even got an official commendation last month for organizing a search party when local girl, Debbie Lupin, went missing. Carter was the only child of missionaries, grew up in Africa, and moved to the US 5 years ago. Jane is suspicious and wins bail money in an inmates' poker game. Lisbon acquires Carter's personal effects to meet Sally again. Jane shows Sally an extra key in Carter's set and hints that Carter had secrets from Sally. While Lisbon leaves, Jane hides in the Carters' home. Sally fetches Tim's keys and goes to a secret room where Debbie Lupin is chained up. She hits a scared Debbie, accusing Tim and her of keeping secrets. Lisbon and Jane rescue the girl and arrest Sally. In court, Debbie testifies against the Carters and thanks Jane. Jane tells the jury he is not guilty of killing Timothy Carter, as he never existed, but admits to killing Red John. In a shock verdict, the jury finds him not guilty on all charges. Later Jane tells Lisbon that Carter was evil, but he was not Red John.
72	2	"Little Red Book"	Eric Laneuville	Tom Szentgyörgyi	September 29, 2011	3X6802	12.92
Bertram rehires Jane due to his high closure rate, but Lisbon stays suspended and the others are reassigned. Bertram assigns Jane to Ray Haffner's (Reed Diamond) team. Jane meets new colleagues Tork, Masterton, and Niskin over the body of murder victim Markus Kuzmenko, a gym instructor who was hit with a heavy object. Haffner recruits Cho to spy on Jane. Jane uses this to mess with Haffner's team and gets them replaced by Van Pelt and Rigsby. They decide to solve the case before Haffner to get Lisbon her job back. Kuzmenko's colleague, Milinuevo, says Kuzmenko had come into money. Jane plants a notebook for Haffner to find containing a rated list of Kuzmenko's sexual conquests including some high-profile lovers. That book causes the politically sensitive Bertram to warn the high-profilers of imminent scandal and he is embarrassed when the book is revealed as fake. Bertram reassigns Haffner and gives in to Jane's demand for Lisbon's reinstatement. To solve the case, Jane calls the suspect to warn her the CBI team is on its way to the gym and as planned the killer - the gym's owner - panics and moves the murder weapon to her car. She had feared that the new gym Kuzmenko was planning to open would put her failing gym out of business. Regarding the Red John case (though officially closed), Lisbon arranges with LaRoche, who is leaving Major Crimes, to interview Sally Carter, but finds she has committed suicide and left a note praising her dead god, Red John. Jane brings in Rosalind Harker (Alicia Witt), the blind woman who lived with Red John for a while, to identify Carter’s body. She feels his face and says she has never met the man before.
73	3	"Pretty Red Balloon"	John F. Showalter	Ashley Gable	October 6, 2011	3X6803	13.15
Jane and the CBI team are assigned the kidnapping case of 9-year old Conner Flint. He is the son of a former client of Jane's, Elisabeth Flint (Kelli Williams), who believes Jane and her son share a psychic connection, since Jane "predicted" his birth several years ago. Jane butts heads with Elisabeth's new "spiritual advisor", Nathan Glass, who has been leeching money from her. Elisabeth is emotionally and financially vulnerable and lives off of her grown stepson's fortune with her son, Conner, and brother, Deke. The team is misled to believe Conner has been kidnapped by a serial kidnapper, "The Balloon Man", who kidnapped two more boys, left behind a balloon animal, and killed both boys within 12 hours of the kidnapping. The team tracks down the killer as a local electrician whom Van Pelt shoots dead. Jane reveals that Conner was not taken by the Balloon Man and fakes a dramatic psychic reading to trap the real kidnapper, who turns out to be Elisabeth's stepson, who was in love with his stepmother and wanted to be a hero before her. Conner is rescued and his stepbrother confesses that after Jane's reading, he panicked and was going to kill Conner. Psychic Glass finally snaps and accuses Jane of trying to steal his action. Jane records the conversation to share with Elisabeth, who finally accepts that Jane is, in fact, not psychic.
74	4	"Ring Around the Rosie"	Chris Long	Daniel Cerone	October 13, 2011	3X6804	12.39
The team has a new boss, Luther Wainwright (Michael Rady), who is taking over, and the team is helping security at the mayor's rally. The team finds a dead body in an alley. On his way to the murder scene, Jane observes a man in an overcoat with a killer's eyes and alerts the team. Apprehending the man, Henry Tibbs, the team finds him with a fully loaded semiautomatic weapon and take him into custody. Jane is convinced that Tibbs is a threat, but the team has to let him go. The dead man is a photographer. His wallet and phone are found on a homeless person, who turns out to be a yesteryear jazz saxophonist who stopped playing when he lost his wife. He readily confesses to the murder, but Lisbon finds loopholes in his story. She finds evidence on the photographer's pawned memory card exonerating him. Van Pelt meets Tibbs' estranged wife, who is terrified of Tibbs and has filed for divorce. Wainwright is skeptical and decides to tackle the Tibbs situation his way. In a search of his house, Lisbon and the team find hidden ammunition. Wainwright's approach cracks Tibbs and he attacks a garden party, but is arrested. No one dies as Lisbon and the team had replaced Tibbs' ammo with blanks. Wainwright and Jane share a moment.
75	5	"Blood and Sand"	John Polson	Eoghan Mahony	October 20, 2011	3X6805	12.54
The CBI is called to San Felix Island off the California coast, where the body of 19-year old Talia Suarez has been found on a beach. A foster kid after her father's murder, Talia was sexually assaulted, then killed. Jane and Lisbon find all the islanders at a town meeting, where Jane explains that the direction of the sea currents shows the body did not wash ashore from the mainland - Talia was killed on the island. Talia's notebook mentions San's Fish Co. As Lisbon interviews the company owner, Jack LaFleur, Jane notices his blueprints for a pier for tourist ships. Lisbon and Jane visit Jed Stack's ranch, as the body must have been carried across his land. Jane obtains information about Stack from ranchhand Whit Naylor, who was injured by a horse and has an arm in a sling. Talia's boyfriend is picked up by Rigsby and Van Pelt, who loses her temper. His public defense lawyer, Sarah Harrigan (Jillian Bach), is dating Rigsby. The boyfriend says Talia was hunting her father's killer, Eddie Fish. Talia's father was stabbed 18 times by drug addict Eddie Fish, who escaped with a fortune and changed his appearance. At an emergency town meeting, Jane has them put all their used coffee mugs on a table, announcing that forensics is checking them for DNA to identify the murderer. Jane's ploy forces Eddie Fish to reveal himself. Gardner is arrested as he tries to flee the island. Jane mentions to Stack and his staff that Eddie Fish stabbed Talia's father 14 times. Naylor corrects him - that he had been stabbed 18 times, accidentally revealing himself as Talia's murderer. A sexual predator, Naylor had been living in isolation, but met Talia on the ferry back from getting his shoulder treated. Talia approached him for help and he raped and killed her. Lisbon confronts Van Pelt about getting complaints of excessive force and asks her if she is okay.
76	6	"Where in the World Is Carmine O'Brien?"	Bobby Roth	David Appelbaum	October 27, 2011	3X6806	12.42
Police Chief Marnie Green is found shot dead in the woods with her car. Jane deduces that she was shot and brought to the location in the trunk of her own car. Discovering she was still alive, the killer shot her again and crashed the car. At Green's residence, Rigsby and Lisbon are held at gunpoint by Annie (Madison McLaughlin), Lisbon's teenaged niece who is there with her father, Tommy (Henry Thomas), Lisbon's younger brother, who is now a bail enforcement agent. He is looking for a skip, Carmine O'Brien, about whom he had contacted Chief Green. Tommy and Lisbon bet on who gets to Carmine first and he requests Lisbon to keep Annie at her office. Carmine O'Brien is revealed to be an accountant from St. Louis, who has a clean record. In his pursuit, Cho is injured and Lisbon and Tommy argue as she thinks he should choose another line of work. Officer Price from Chief Green's unit informs Lisbon that she pulled over a Russian named Dmitri Zubov. Lisbon and Jane find Zubov (Carlo Rota) at Eagleton Inn in Fairmont. The inn owner's son, Chad Carmichael, goes over his father and hands over video footage that reveals Zubov assaulted a maid who had confided in Chief Green. Zubov has an alibi, but saw Jory Kresser with the chief. Jory admits that her drug-addict son, Steven, has been missing and she wanted Chief Green to check on him at a cabin in the woods. Rigsby and Officer Price find Steve's body in the woods with cocaine on him. Jane lays a trap, leading everyone to believe Carmine O'Brien witnessed Chief Green and Steve's murders. He hands over O'Brien to Tommy, who reaches the inn and is interrupted by Chad Carmichael, who promises to triple his bounty if he drops O'Brien off to Mexico. Lisbon and Tommy overpower Chad when Annie creates a diversion. He confesses to murdering the chief and Steve because his father paid him nothing, but dealing drugs did. Lisbon and Tommy make peace as she tells him she is proud of him.
77	7	"Blinking Red Light"	Simon Baker	Ken Woodruff	November 3, 2011	3X6807	13.66
The team finds the body of 19-year old Michelle Carp in a park with her throat slit neatly, hands and feet carefully tied by wire, and pebbles from the crime scene on her eyes. The method fits four other murders with all victims being teenaged girls dumped in random locations. Jane urges Lisbon to use her instincts, and she chooses to focus on suspect Richard Haibach, a photographer reported for loitering outside high schools. Dubbed as the San Joaquin Killer (SJK), Jane watches Karen Cross (Missi Pyle) interview Special Agent Wainwright and a blogger James Panzer (David Paymer), who has devoted his life to capturing the SJK. SJK's first victim, Molly Maier, lived in Panzer's neighborhood; he is hoping his exhaustive research will identify the killer. Meanwhile, Lisbon and the others break Haibach's alibi and find his darkroom full of suggestive photos of scantily clad teenagers. None of Haibach's photos match any of the dead girls. The photography is not illegal, and Haibach is released. Jane meets with Panzer and asks him to take him to meet Molly’s parents. In Molly's room, Jane finds a DVD of her dancing to Louis Armstrong’s “What a Wonderful World”. Jane looks around Panzer's office and finds an iPod with “What a Wonderful World” on it. The two disagree over SJK's character and motive, with Panzer insisting SJK is to be feared when Jane thinks it is cry for attention. Later, a sixth SJK victim is found. Based on Molly's DVD and his reading of Panzer, Jane announces to Lisbon and Wainwright that Panzer is the killer and promises to catch him by morning before Agent Susan Darcy (Catherine Dent) of the FBI takes over. Jane asks Lisbon to pin the murders on someone else (Haibach) to take away from Panzer what he wants most - credit and awe. Jane, as an expert on serial killer Red John, agrees to appear with Panzer on Cross' TV show. Jane manipulates Panzer into disparaging Red John compared to SJK. Later, Panzer is found dead, with all the hallmarks of a Red John murder.
78	8	"Pink Tops"	Tom Verica	Erika Green Swafford	November 17, 2011	3X6808	12.21
Undercover cop Yolanda Herrera is found dead with two shots to the back of her head. She was investigating drug dealer Omar Vega (Kamar de los Reyes) and was looking for his current base of operation. Cho picks up smart-mouthed Summer (Samaire Armstrong), who is caught using Yolanda's credit card at a hotel and who was also the person who anonymously called in the shooting. Looking for a deal, Summer tells the team that Vega was looking for more product (cocaine) and revenge after his base was busted by the Perry boys two days before the murder. Meanwhile, Jane uncovers Yolanda's cousin, Elvia (Gina Rodriguez), was at the club trying to find out if Yolanda was having an affair or working with the Perry boys. They find a deserted house, suspecting it to be where the Perry boys are, but find them dead and drug traces but no drugs. Jane creates an elaborate plan where he flicks a sample of cocaine from the Narcotics Task Force and offers Vega a deal. Vega tells him that Officer Bianca Trotter (Yolanda's best friend and an undercover cop herself) made him the same deal. She confesses to having killed Yolanda after Yolanda suspected a dirty cop was in their unit and tried framing the Perry boys for it. Elsewhere, Cho and Summer strike an unusual rapport and Cho decides to hire her as his confidential informant.
79	9	"The Redshirt"	Eric Laneuville	Jordan Harper	December 8, 2011	3X6809	13.04
NFL quarterback Doc Dugan (Craig Bierko) is getting into his car when his car blows up, but the victim turns out to be his assistant, Jake, who was wearing Doc's jacket so Doc could dodge a subpoena. Jane decides that Doc should play dead to help catch the killer, so only Lisbon, Jane, Doc's agent Alex, and his manager Steve know the truth. Lisbon takes Jake's mother, Valerie, into confidence; she gives the CBI two days to conclude the investigation. Doc's manager and agent both believe his girlfriend Marie St. Claire may be responsible, but Jane rules her out. His ex-wife Anna (Ashley Williams) mentions that Doc lost his way after retiring. Meanwhile, Rigsby and Harrigan take their relationship to the next level.
80	10	"Fugue in Red"	Randy Zisk	Daniel Cerone	December 15, 2011	3X6810	13.16
Jane almost drowns while investigating the murder of a fireman and loses his memory, turning him into the old con man Patrick Jane.
81	11	"Always Bet on Red"	John F. Showalter	Ashley Gable	January 12, 2012	3X6811	13.65
Cho's new confidential informant, Summer (Samaire Armstrong), has well-connected lawyer friend Alton Creek contact the CBI after he gets death threats, but he is blown up on his boat just as the team is walking down the pier. Larry Dersh (Don Franklin), Creek's partner, is represented by co-worker Colette (Heather Mazur); both are less than forthcoming with information, but Dersh confirms that Creek and he argued over money. He points the blame at Summer, instead. Agent Susan Darcy (Catherine Dent) of the FBI, investigating Panzer's murder, asks Jane if he is sure he killed Red John and what they have is a copycat killer. Lisbon wants Jane to tell the truth - that he killed a killer, but not Red John. That night, Jane and Van Pelt watch a video uploaded to CBI containing real-time stalker footage of Darcy. The two rush to Darcy, who is safe and Jane realizes it was a message to him from Red John. Darcy refuses Jane's urging to leave the case. Summer tells Cho of Creek's illegal poker games. Suspecting the Mob, Cho has Summer work a way to get a mobster chief, Brock Marx, to the CBI for questioning. When Jane learns that Tom Maier, father of Panzer's first victim, has hanged himself, Jane frames him for Panzer's murder by planting evidence at the crime scene and goes to the morgue to put Tom's fingerprints on a "murder weapon" bought for the purpose. At Tom's funeral, widow Teri reads Tom's letter of confession (forged by Jane). She is comforted by Tom's final strength of purpose. Jane closes the Creek case by doing reads on the suspects, backed up by financial evidence. Colette is arrested for Creek's murder; she was a woman scorned, hating Creek's friendship with Summer, and her angry attempt to justify murdering Creek provides conclusive evidence.
82	12	"My Bloody Valentine"	Elodie Keene	Tom Szentgyörgyi	January 19, 2012	3X6812	14.22
Lisbon returns Van Pelt's necklace that fiance Craig O'Laughlin gave her, now that the investigation into the incident is over. Cho, Jane, and Van Pelt are called to the home of Gabriel Porchetto (Joaquim de Almeida), a leading mobster dying from kidney cancer. His eldest son Gabriel Jr. was the victim of a professional hit, shot dead in the hot tub at a house party. Curtis Nett (Matt Battaglia), Porchetto's enforcer, exchanged fire with the hitman, who escaped over the boundary fence. Jane notices that Nett disparages Porchetto's teenaged son and new heir, Sergio. One of several hookers at the party, Janpen (Kristy Wu), was with the victim when he was shot. She reluctantly goes with Van Pelt, but they are attacked en route and the pair must walk through the woods to the nearest town. Back at the CBI, boss Luther Wainwright tells the team to leave the search for Van Pelt to the search party. Jane contrives a private meeting with Porchetto, who thinks the rival Zeta family killed his son, but using a mind trick, Jane gets the Zeta boss to reveal that the Zetas were not interested in killing Gabriel Jr. Rigsby realizes the search team is looking in the wrong place and heads out. Jane privately gets Porchetto drunk. When he passes out, Jane makes it look like he may be dead and the family rushes him to hospital. Lisbon plays along with Jane's ruse. Nett then reveals that he has already established power bases and will be the new head of the family. Lisbon threatens to tell Porchetto, and Nett, knowing Porchetto would kill him, confesses to the murder of Gabriel Jr. In the woods, the hitman finds and shoots at Van Pelt, but she kills him. The hallucination of O'Laughlin warns her someone is behind her. She turns and subdues the attacking Janpen, just as Rigsby arrives. Back at the CBI, Janpen confesses she shot Gabriel Jr. and that she and the male hitman worked for Nett. She briefly went "missing" in the woods to find a phone signal to call in her accomplice. Sarah, Rigsby's girlfriend, tells him she is pregnant. After talking to Jane, Van Pelt decides to keep the necklace.
83	13	"Red Is the New Black"	Tom Verica	Eoghan Mahony	February 2, 2012	3X6813	13.87
Wyck Theissens (Andrew Pifko) is found stabbed to death in his rented loft, with a gold-painted feather in his mouth. Jane finds the hidden door into Theissens' true workplace - a tailor shop full of high-end couture dresses, including one with gold-painted feathers. They find the murder weapon - a pair of bloodied tailor's scissors. Theissens’ three young assistants have solid alibis. They were working with Theissens on his comeback - a new line for his former employer Guy Duval (Cosimo Fusco). Theissens had been financing his work by making knock-off couture dresses for his landlord Mr. Liu, who was angry that Theissens was going to stop making fakes. Duval's assistant, Acosta, who had released Theissens' video two years ago and derailed Theissens' career, shows violent tendencies and puts Lisbon onto photographer Tony Redgrave. Jane meets Redgrave while he photographs a model named Sasha (Becky O'Donohue). Redgrave could not care less, but Sasha is upset about his death. Cho and Rigsby arrest two Chinese thugs torturing Liu. The thugs are released, as they have diplomatic immunity, but Jane eliminates them as suspects in the murder. Jane shows the feather to all the suspects, until Sasha reacts and confesses. She had assumed she would feature in Theissens' comeback show. Instead, he told her she was too old and someone new and fresh would wear the gold-feather dress. Furious, Sasha stabbed him. Agent Darcy tells Luther Wainwright she does not believe Maier killed Panzer nor that Red John is dead. She has him secretly give her CBI's Red John files. Darcy speaks to the morgue attendant who was on duty when Jane brought in Red John's blind friend Rosalind Harker and then visits Harker. Harker calls Jane saying Red John is with her and wants them to know he will sort out the misunderstanding. Jane, Darcy, CBI, and police show up, but Red John has gone. In the closet, they find the morgue attendant's body.
84	14	"At First Blush"	Roxann Dawson	David Appelbaum	February 9, 2012	3X6814	14.68
Patrick Jane watches as Eve Mulberry (Bonnie Somerville), owner of Luna Valley Vineyards, faces journalists before attending the closing arguments in her trial for the murder of Carlos Ruiz. Jane is convinced she is innocent, but the DA refuses to heed Jane leading Lisbon's team to start an investigation despite damning evidence against Eve. Moreover, Eve admits she lied about her affair with Ruiz earlier. Her husband Peter is devastated, though he had suspected the affair making him a suspect. Ruiz's neighbor Gloria identifies a picture of Eve as the woman who visited him the night of the murder. Jane says Gloria's sense of time is unreliable, as she owns no clocks or calendars. Dan Silva, the detective in charge, was too keen to close the case and forgot that Riley spoke to Ruiz on the day of his death and never followed up. Riley, real name Terry Murphy, has a record for identity theft and fraud. Cho brings in Summer to plan a sting on Murphy. Summer is injured, but Rigsby and Cho arrest Murphy. Cho fires Summer for being reckless. Murphy admits he had lent Ruiz money and had no reason to kill him. Eve had wanted to keep her business small, but her partner Amy (Diane Farr) is more ambitious, so Jane suspects her. Jane plants information that they found a video of the murder recorded by cameras Murphy had hidden in Ruiz's apartment. He has Rigsby place a call, and Amy comes to collect the video. The team makes it to court just in time and Amy confesses that she wanted Eve out of the way so she could have the business to herself. Summer accosts Cho in the elevator, asking for her job back and confronts him about his feelings for her. He finally admits he likes her, and they share a passionate kiss.
85	15	"War of the Roses"	Geary McLeod	Ken Woodruff	February 16, 2012	3X6815	13.55
The team discovers the body of Natalie Gibecki, a youth counselor, who is suspected to have been on her way to meet a secret lover. Jane receives a call from Erica Flynn (Morena Baccarin), whom Patrick helped put in prison. She offers to help with Natalie's case as she was a client at Erica's matchmaking company. Wainwright agrees and she is furloughed to help with the investigation. Erica mentions that Natalie started dating a married man when she was working with a nonprofit building homes in Mexico. They speak with the CEO Greg Relin (Joe Spano) and a coworker, who deny knowledge of her affair, but Erica spots a man named Richard who turns out to be Natalie's lover. Richard becomes a prime suspect, since Natalie had broken things off with him recently and was going to meet him the night she was killed. Erica tries to seduce Patrick, telling him she genuinely likes him and they share a kiss before he abruptly leaves her room. Jane goes through Natalie's photos and cracks the case. The CEO is arrested as Natalie confronted him about his embezzlement of funds when she discovered on a trip to Mexico that he had built no houses there. Rigsby proposes to Sarah, thinking it is the right thing to do, but Sarah turns him down happy with their current status. Erica and Patrick share a dinner and Patrick tells her they apprehended her lawyer, who was waiting for her a few blocks away. Agent Luther Wainwright signs her over to officers from the prison when a moment later, the real officers arrive. A free Erica calls Jane from "somewhere warm" and thanks him for their date.
86	16	"His Thoughts Were Red Thoughts"	Charles Beeson	Jordan Harper	February 23, 2012	3X6816	13.36
An anticult activist, Gabriel Meadows, is found dead. At the crime scene, Jane spots Officer Downs as a member of "Visualize" and identifies him as the person who cleaned up evidence from the scene after a sloppy murder. Founder of "Visualize" Bret Stiles (Malcolm McDowell) personally visits CBI to have the officer admit to evidence tampering. The team find Stiles has no alibi for the time of the murder and they discover his suit covered in blood from a dumpster. Meadows had been investigating an old case about Timothy Farragut researching proof of Stiles being involved in the death. Meadows was an ex-Visualize member and was trying to get his sister, Jessie, out of Visualize College run by Dean Nora Hill (Louise Lombard). Jessie tells Lisbon Meadows was no longer a part of her life. Jane realizes that the entire case is Stiles' play to frame himself so he can figure out which one of the eight members from his inner circle was trying to overthrow him. Jane figures out that the only person who did not vote for Jackson Cooper and supported Stiles is Dean Nora Hill, the killer, because she knew Stiles would be back. She confesses she was Meadows' source from within Visualize and fed him stories to hurt her rivals within Visualize. She feared Meadows would reveal her identity. Grace and Stiles share a moment as he tries to offer her help. Stiles realizes that Patrick helped him figure out the coup at Visualize because he wanted Stiles to owe him a favor and now Stiles does.
87	17	"Cheap Burgundy"	Bruno Heller	Bruno Heller	March 8, 2012	3X6817	13.84
The CBI investigates the murder of a woman named Matilda Cruz, whose killer is suspected to be someone she met in an online chatroom for Shakespeare lovers. Her boss, Gary Philo (Craig Sheffer), announces a $10 million reward for information leading to the arrest of her killer. Jane announces Philo is the killer and gets punched in the face. FBI Agent Susan Darcy requests Jane to join her on a case. Lisbon and Jane suspect Darcy is hiding something and Lisbon urges Jane to tell her the truth about Red John. Lisbon has a confrontation with Philo, leaving her furious and convinced he is, in fact, the murderer. Jane and Darcy investigate the death of Katie Bauer, who married into a rich family. They speak to her in-laws, Greg and Shirley (Roxanne Hart), who reported her missing. Katie called a pizzeria before she left home, and one of the pizzeria owners, ex-army man James Barca, has been missing. Darcy and Jane find Barca in the woods covered in Katie's blood and holding the murder weapon. Barca makes no effort to hide his crime. Jane realizes that Katie was not wearing her wedding ring, indicating she was having an affair with Barca. Jane uses a chatty ranger to plant news that they are going to arrest Barca's brother Manny after they search his place. Darcy and Jane have a falling out when he admits Red John is alive and she accuses him of being one of his disciples. Jane calls Lisbon, who makes the arrest on Katie's in-laws, who had come to Manny's house to plant evidence. The Bauers killed Katie because of her affair. They drugged her wine with horse tranquilizers and killed Katie while Barca and she were passed out. As Philo is leaving the CBI building, Jane runs into him and misquotes Shakespeare, prompting him to instantly correct him and thus expose his lies about not knowing anything about Shakespeare. Darcy shares her suspicions about Jane with Wainwright and tells him the FBI will be investigating, and he can choose to co-operate or go down with Jane. Wainwright assures her of his support.
88	18	"Ruddy Cheeks"	Eric Laneuville	Erika Green Swafford	March 9, 2012	3X6818	11.83
The CBI investigates the murder of cancer patient Archer Braddock, whose buried body was uncovered by escaped tigers. He is survived by his live-in adult daughter Liesl, and estranged adult son Aden (August Emerson). Archer, a recovering alcoholic, had kicked Aden out a year ago over drug addiction. He had recently married Helen (Rebecca McFarland), a fellow cancer patient he met at a support group. Jane unmasks Helen, who had faked cancer to marry and inherit from a dying wealthy man, and she is booked for fraud, though she did not kill him. They meet Nurse Administrator Betsy Firth and Dr. Scheck who were treating Archer. Scheck wants access to the body for research as per contract. Jane tracks down Archer's last appointment by tracking down 'the tea of clarity' sold by Brother Josef. Brother Josef asks for access to the body to "release his energy so he can cross over peacefully." Aden turns himself in and says Tran, his dealer, had been asking questions about his father's wealth. When they go to question Tran, Cho's constant pill-popping for his back pain makes him fall asleep on the job and Rigsby is nearly shot. Tran alibis out. Jane announces that the coroner will do the autopsy the next day. Lisbon and he hide at the mortuary that night and arrest Brother Josef when he arrives. However, the body is stolen after they leave. Jane realizes the killer's next move. They rush to the Scheck Institute, where they find Nurse Firth cutting up the body and burning it to destroy the evidence. Firth had been taking bribes to place people in drug trials. She had missed Archer's damaged liver. As a result, Scheck's drugs were killing Archer faster than the cancer. She knew an autopsy would reveal her mistake and her corruption. Aden decides to reconcile with his sister and go to rehabilitation. Humbled by Rigsby almost getting shot, Cho flushes his painkillers down the toilet.
89	19	"Pink Champagne on Ice"	David Von Ancken	Eoghan Mahony	March 29, 2012	3X6819	13.62
Casino employee Ryan De Stefano is found shot dead near his car on Highway 49. At the Golden Fox Casino, manager Dante Holmes says he fired Stefano as a security guard after learning of his criminal past. Jane runs into his old magician friend, Jack Hellion (Andrew Rothenberg), at the casino. The CBI discovers that De Stefano got into a fight with Holmes over his firing, but Jane suspects the casino is connected with the mafia. The team discovers that the passenger in De Stefano's car was Holly Danvers. They track down her trailer, where they find her roommate's dead body and suspect she is on the run. After Jane prods him, Hellion admits that he is being blackmailed by Holly's kidnappers to rob the casino. He has recruited Skiddy and Vincent, both thieves, and his assistant Trish to help. Jane offers to help and secretly calls in the CBI team. Hellion performs an act on stage in which his face is hidden, allowing him to leave the stage. Jane steals the vault key from Holmes' pocket. Hellion and he load the vault's cash into a large box and into a van. The key is secretly returned to Holmes and Hellion returns to the stage. Jane steals Skitty and Vincent's car keys, leaving them behind as Hellion and he drive the van to meet the kidnapper. The kidnapper is Trish. She is about to kill Jane, Hellion, and Danvers, when Lisbon bursts from the box supposedly containing the cash, and arrests her. Back at the CBI, Trish says she did it for the money. De Stefano killed Danvers' roommate, brought her Danvers, and then Trish killed him.
90	20	"Something's Rotten in Redmund"	Guy Ferland	Rebecca Perry Cutter	April 5, 2012	3X6820	12.59
On his school's baseball field, English teacher Jack McTierney is found with his skull bashed in. On his body are Ecstasy pills and a letter. The letter leads to Lindy Hayes, who had left school 2 years ago. McTierney was urging her to leave prostitution and return to school. Hayes says he had "projects" trying to help people. Jane gets involved with the school's production of the play Hamlet, impressing theater teacher Ms. Austin (Emily Bergl). Jane learns that the school's career counselor, Mr. Loveland, sought help for alcoholism from McTierney, but Principal Snyder (Matt McCoy) found out and made Loveland's life miserable. Loveland, assuming McTierney had reported him as they had talked alone in the boys' bathroom, had an argument with McTierney. Jane paints 'Snyder Sucks' in large letters on the walls of the boys' bathroom resulting in Snyder summoning Jane and Lisbon. Jane exposes how Snyder had illegal hidden cameras in the bathrooms (for "discipline" purposes). Jane identifies the murderer from watching footage of Billy (Tom Maden) tidying his appearance in the bathroom and picking a leaf out of his hair. On stage, in Shakespearean character, he accuses Billy of "lust in the woods next to the baseball field....the murder of Mr. McTierney, a murder born of unnatural lust between woman and boy...(murder) with this baseball bat." Billy accuses Ms. Austin and Lisbon arrests her. Snyder faces ruin when Jane tells the audience about his hidden cameras. At CBI, Ms. Austin confesses to murder and statutory rape. McTierney had caught her with Billy, so she killed him. Sarah gives birth to Rigsby's and her son, whom they name Benjamin.
91	21	"Ruby Slippers"	Kevin Hooks	Daniel Cerone	April 26, 2012	3X6821	12.03
The CBI team investigates the murder of Archie Bloom, aged 19, found handcuffed to the steering wheel of his car, which had been doused in gasoline and set alight. A woman's shoe heel at the scene leads the team to the stage door of a drag queen cabaret troupe. The lead act, Glenda Snow (Carlton Wilborn), says he lost the heel before the fire occurred. Van Pelt discovers Bloom's secret film footage showing his father, Archie Senior (William R. Moses), abusing him and handcuffing him to his desk chair. Bloom worked at the store where the gasoline cans were bought and was being bullied by a co-worker, homophobe Rick Hughes. Rigsby finds Bloom took photos of Hughes stealing baby formula from the store to sell on the black market. Bloom was living at a halfway house, where Cho finds Bloom's journal describing how his ex-landlord Gabriel Lamb (Don McManus) had forced him to take crystal meth. Cho and Van Pelt arrest Lamb, who is found in possession of meth. Jane visits Glenda at a funeral home, where he works as a funeral cosmetologist. He admits seeing someone pour gasoline on the car. Lisbon does not know which of Hughes, Lamb, and Bloom Sr. to charge with the murder. Jane convinces Glenda to identify the culprit from a lineup, but he says the person pouring gasoline was slimmer, like Bloom himself. This confirms Jane's theory that Bloom killed himself, but left evidence for the police to charge his abusers. To cheer Lisbon up, Jane reveals the final secret - Bloom staged his death with help from Glenda and a dentist in the cabaret troupe and transformed to Fifi Nix inspired by a phoenix rising from the flames. Happy for Bloom, Lisbon agrees to keep his secret.
92	22	"So Long, and Thanks for All the Red Snapper"	Chris Long	Ashley Gable	May 3, 2012	3X6822	12.94
The team investigate the murder of a surfer named Jay Spanner. Jay's last employer turns out to be Lisbon's ex fiance, Greg, who she moved away from many years ago.
93	23	"Red Rover, Red Rover"	John F. Showalter	Tom Szentgyörgyi	May 10, 2012	3X6823	12.62
Exactly nine years after the day his wife and daughter were murdered by Red John, Jane finds a note on his windshield saying 'Happy Anniversary.' At the cemetery, a young girl brings Jane a message from Red John asking him if he has given up yet. Jane takes the day off and after drinking heavily, burns his Red John files. The next morning, he tells Lisbon and Wainwright he is giving up on Red John because nothing has changed. The team investigates the death of Antonio Castro, whose decomposed body is found 11 months after he disappeared. He was bound and left to die in a locked box. His boss, Dennis Victor (Ray Wise), tells them that Antonio was engaged to his niece, Marcy (Amanda Schull). Marcy confesses that she had started a relationship with Ian (David Furr), who tells the team the firm found out recently that Antonio had been stealing from the firm. The team interviews Dennis Victor and Benjamin Marx (Aaron Lohr), who later tell Jane about the elite club called 19:24 and that Antonio was to be instated into the club. Jane lays a trap to detect who is lying and discovers Benjamin was the actual thief and killed Antonio when he found out. He buries Benjamin alive to extract a confession. Jane refuses to apologize and insults Wainwright after he suspends Jane. They almost get into a scuffle and Wainwright eventually fires Jane.
94	24	"The Crimson Hat"	Chris Long	Bruno Heller	May 17, 2012	3X6824	13.09
Six months after he was fired from the CBI, Jane hits Vegas and meets Lorelei Martins (Emmanuelle Chriqui) just before he is attacked by a heavyweight for a fake psychic reading. He is beaten up by the guy and is finally tased and arrested. Lorelei posts his bail and pays him a visit, and the two sleep together till she tells him the next morning that she does what Red John tells her to do and that Patrick's freedom and their night together was a gift from Red John, who has come to see Jane as a comrade and is offering a hand of friendship. A visibly upset Lisbon visits the church where Jane surprises her and tells her that he has been faking his breakdown to have Red John seek him out and make him his disciple. He gives Lisbon a clean cell phone and tells her he would contact her. Wainwright tells Lisbon it might be time to reach out to Jane, but she refuses. Lorelei tells Jane that Red John would give him a new identity in exchange for Jane's friendship and Lisbon's dead body. Jane fakes killing Lisbon and Rigsby. He bikes to a car, where Lorelei sees through his ruse and loads him into a car with Red John. Meanwhile, the CBI team is apprehended by FBI Agent Susan Darcy, who refuses to listen to them. Red John tells Jane that he has a friend in the FBI, so he knew about Jane's plan. Jane asks him to go to hell and Red John instructs Lorelei to cut off two of Jane's fingers, but Darcy's team arrives just in time. Shots are fired and in a car chase, Darcy's team arrests Lorelei and finds that in the car's backseat, it was Luther Wainwright, now dead, with a phone taped to him. Lorelei tells Lisbon that Jane and she were lovers and refuses to ever talk to the CBI about Red John.

== U.S. ratings ==
No.	Title	Original U.S. air date	Viewers (in millions)	Rating (Adults 18–49)	Rank (per week)
1	"Scarlet Ribbons"	September 22, 2011	13.56	2.8/7	#15
2	"Little Red Book"	September 29, 2011	12.92	2.6/7	#12
3	"Pretty Red Balloon"	October 6, 2011	13.15	2.7/7	#13
4	"Ring Around the Rosie"	October 13, 2011	12.39	2.5/7	#13
5	"Blood and Sand"	October 20, 2011	12.54	2.5/7	#15
6	"Where in the World is Carmine O'Brien?"	October 27, 2011	12.42	2.5/6	#13
7	"Blinking Red Light"	November 3, 2011	13.66	2.9/8	#11
8	"Pink Tops"	November 17, 2011	12.21	2.5/7	#14
9	"The Redshirt"	December 8, 2011	13.04	2.7/7	#7
10	"Fugue in Red"	December 15, 2011	13.16	2.7/7	#6
11	"Always Bet on Red"	January 12, 2012	13.65	2.7/7	#8
12	"My Bloody Valentine"	January 19, 2012	14.22	3.0/8	#7
13	"Red Is the New Black"	February 2, 2012	13.87	2.9/8	#8
14	"At First Blush"	February 9, 2012	14.68	3.0/8	#9
15	"War of the Roses"	February 16, 2012	13.55	2.7/7	#7
16	"His Thoughts Were Red Thoughts"	February 23, 2012	13.36	2.6/7	#11
17	"Cheap Burgundy"	March 8, 2012	13.84	2.8/8	#7
18	"Ruddy Cheeks"	March 9, 2012	11.83	1.8/5	#10
19	"Pink Champagne on Ice"	March 29, 2012	13.62	2.7/8	#10
20	"Something's Rotten in Redmund"	April 5, 2012	12.59	2.4/7	#8
21	"Ruby Slippers"	April 26, 2012	12.03	2.2/6	#8
22	"So Long, and Thanks For All the Red Snapper"	May 3, 2012	12.94	2.5/7	#9
23	"Red Rover, Red Rover"	May 10, 2012	12.62	2.4/7	#9
24	"The Crimson Hat"	May 17, 2012	13.09	2.5/7	#9

== Production ==
Speaking of the season, creator Bruno Heller said, "Every season, you kind of take a chance to reset things. ... Last season was almost serialized. There was a great deal of plot and story that you could follow through the whole season. We're going to need less of that this season." He commented that the new season would explore Jane's feelings about finally catching his "white whale", Red John: "What does revenge mean? Because, as you saw in that final moment, after you've killed someone, what's left? ... That kind of bitterness and hate kills things. But then, what do you do?"

== DVD release ==
All 24 episodes were included in the five disc complete fourth season set. It was released on September 18, 2012 in Region 1, October 8, 2012 in Region 2, and November 7, 2012 in Region 4. It included the featurette "CBI: Behind the Badge".
