= Tom Prior =

English actor (born 1990)

- Born: 2 December 1990 (age 35); England, United Kingdom
- Education: Royal Academy of Dramatic Art
- Occupations: Actor, producer, and writer
- Years active: 2014–present
- Website: www.tomcprior.com

Christopher Thomas Prior (born December 1990) is an English actor, known for his lead role as Sergey in the British-Estonian historical romantic drama Firebird. He has also appeared in supporting roles in Kingsman: The Secret Service and in The Theory of Everything as Stephen Hawking's son Robert.

== Early life ==
Prior was educated at The Thomas Hardye School in Dorchester, Dorset. In 2002, he appeared in Fire from Heaven, produced by the Dorchester Community Plays Association. He studied Performing Arts at Weymouth College, graduating with distinction, before attending the Royal Academy of Dramatic Art (RADA). He graduated from RADA in 2012.

== Career ==
Prior's West End debut was in 2013 in a trio of plays produced by the National Youth Theatre: Tory Boyz by James Graham; Romeo and Juliet; and Prince of Denmark, a Hamlet prequel by Michael Lesslie.

Prior wrote his first short film Breaking the Circle in 2014.

In 2021, Prior starred in Firebird as Sergey Serebrennikov. He co-wrote and produced the film with director Peeter Rebane. The film is about the real-life romance between a conscript, Sergey Fetisov, and a fighter pilot in Soviet era Estonia. Rebane began working on a screenplay based on a memoir by Fetisov. After learning about the script, Prior met with Rebane in London.

== Personal life ==
Prior identifies as a member of the LGBTQ+ community.

== Filmography ==
=== Film ===
Year	Title	Role	Notes
2014	The Theory of Everything	17 year-old Robert Hawking	
2014	Kingsman: The Secret Service	Hugo	
2016	Dusty and Me	Georgie	
2020	Iceland Is Best	Jack	
2021	Blood on the Crown	Private Love	
2021	Firebird	Sergey Serebrennikov	Also co-writer, co-producer, and music supervisor

=== Television ===
Year	Title	Role	Notes
2014	Endeavour	Billy Karswell	Episode: "Nocturne"
2017	Three Girls	Police Officer	Episode #1.2

== Awards and nominations ==
Year	Award	Category	Nominated work	Result	Ref.
2021	FilmOut San Diego	Best Actor	Firebird	Won	
2021	FilmOut San Diego	Best Narrative Feature	Firebird	Won	
