= Sofia Mattsson (actress) =

Swedish-American actress

- Born: Stockholm, Sweden
- Occupation: Actress
- Years active: 2012–present
- Spouse: Thomas Payton (m. 2016)
- Children: 2
- Relatives: Helena Mattsson (sister)

Sofia Mattsson is a Swedish-American actress. She is recognized for her role as Sasha Gilmore on General Hospital, a soap opera on the ABC network.

== Early life and career ==
Mattsson was born and raised in Stockholm, Sweden. Her older sister is actress Helena Mattsson. Mattsson began her career in 2012, appearing in guest-starring roles on television series such as Two and a Half Men and NCIS. She made her big screen debut in the 2015 action adventure film Jurassic City. Mattsson later appeared in several horror films, notable Gothic Harvest (2019), and starred in the Lifetime television films My Husband's Secret Wife (2018) alongside her sister, Long Lost Daughter (2018), and The Wrong Husband (2019). In 2018, Mattsson was cast as Sasha Gilmore in the ABC daytime soap opera, General Hospital. She made her debut on September 18, 2018, and exited the role on July 18, 2025. In March 2026, it was announced Mattsson had joined the cast of Days of Our Lives in an undisclosed role. Scenes concerning her debut will be streamed in 2027.

== Personal life ==
Mattsson is married to writer/producer Thomas Payton. Together, they have two children, born in 2021 and 2023. In 2022 she officially became a citizen of the United States.

== Filmography ==
=== Film ===
Year	Title	Role	Notes
2012	Shame on Me	Veronica	Short film
2015	Hollywood Miles	Roxy	Short film
2015	Jurassic City	Stephanie	
2017	Becoming Bond	Gundel	
2017	Misirlou	Jenny	
2017	LoveJacked	Skye	
2018	My Husband's Secret Wife	Cat	
2018	Long Lost Daughter	Michelle Jacobs	Television film
2019	Gothic Harvest	Amelia Boudine	
2019	The Wrong Husband	Alisa	Television film

=== Television ===
Year	Title	Role	Notes
2013	Two and a Half Men	Inga	Episode: "Grab a Feather and Get in Line"
2013	NCIS	Jessica	Episode: "Revenge"
2013	Perception	Student	Episode: "Toxic"
2014	Unstrung	Ninotchka	Pilot
2017	StartUp	Milla	Episode: "Early Adopters"
2018–2025	General Hospital	Sasha Gilmore	Series regular
