= Alexia Fast =

Canadian actress (born 1992)

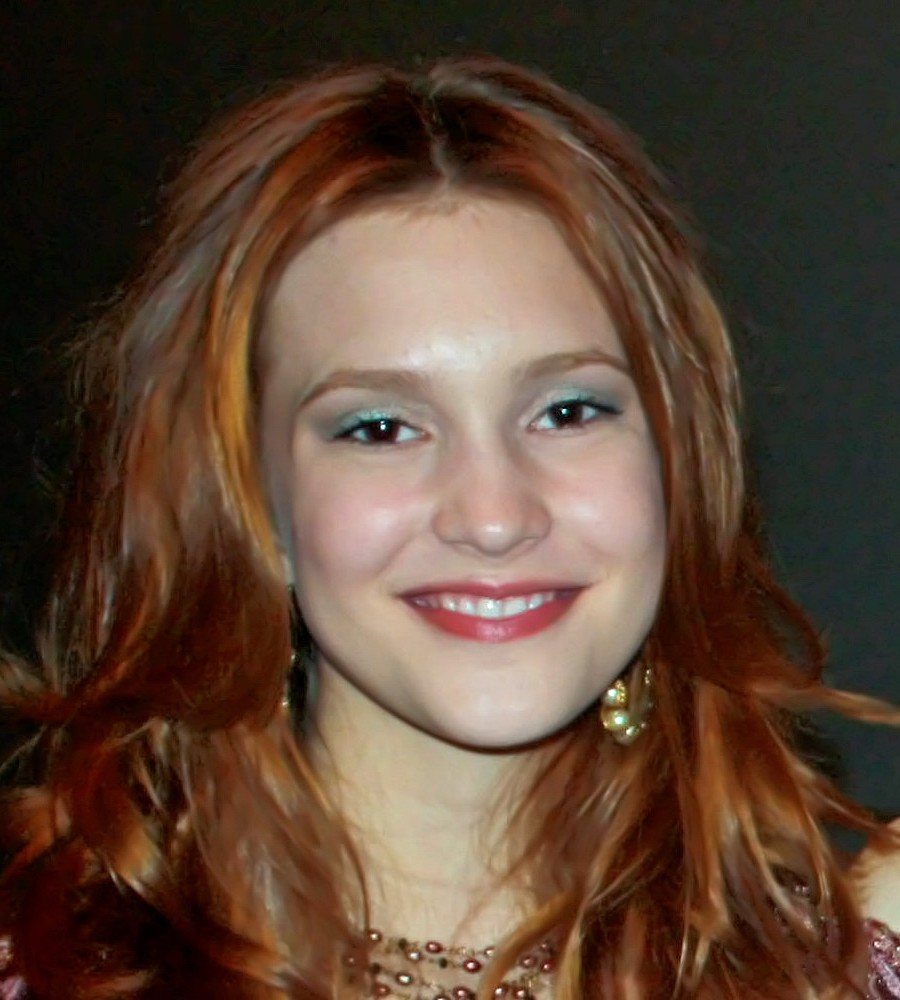
- Fast in 2011
- Born: 12 September 1992 (age 34); Vancouver, British Columbia, Canada
- Occupation: Actress
- Years active: 2002–present

Alexia Fast (born 12 September 1992) is a Canadian actress who began her career at the age of seven when she wrote, directed and starred in the short film The Red Bridge, which premiered at the 2002 Atlantic and Reel to Reel Film Festivals. She obtained her first agent at the age of 11 and starred in her first feature film, Fido (2006), at 13.

== Career ==
At the age of seven, Alexia Fast wrote, directed and starred in a short film entitled The Red Bridge. She starred in her first feature film, Fido (2006), after gaining her first agent at the age of 11. She has appeared in a number of television films, feature films and in episodes of various television series. Fast played a role in Hungry Hills and Repeaters, both of which premiered at the Toronto International Film Festival. In 2010, she had a leading role in Triple Dog. In 2012, she had a supporting role in the film Jack Reacher.

Fast has won two Leo Awards, the first one 2007 in the category Best Lead Performance by a Female in a Feature Length Drama for her role in Past Tense and 2011 in the category Best Supporting Performance by a Female in a Feature Length Drama for Repeaters.

== Filmography ==
=== Film ===
Year	Title	Role	Notes
2006	Fido	Cindy Bottoms	
2007	Kickin' It Old Skool	Young Jennifer	
2009	Helen	Julie	
2009	What Goes Up	Hannah	
2009	Hungry Hills	Robin	
2010	Repeaters	Charlotte Halsted	
2010	Triple Dog	Eve	
2012	Last Kind Words	Amanda	
2012	Blackbird	Deanna Roy	
2012	Jack Reacher	Sandy	
2014	The Captive	Cassandra Lane	Working title was Queen of the Night
2014	Grace	Grace / Mary	also known as Grace: The Possession
2017	The Ninth Passenger	Jess	
2019	We Had It Coming	Olivia	
2021	Apex	West Zaroff	
2022	The Last Mark	Peyton	

=== Television ===
Year	Series	Role	Notes
2005	His and Her Christmas	Jacqui	Television film
2006	Past Tense	Sara Shay	Television film
2006	Firestorm: Last Stand at Yellowstone	Maya	Television film
2006	Supernatural	Missy Bender	Episode: "The Benders"
2006	Swimming Lessons	Mean Girl	Television film
2006–2007	The 4400	Lindsey Hammond	3 episodes
2007	The Party Never Stops: Diary of a Binge Drinker	Sadie Brenner	Television film
2007	Masters of Horror	Marylyn	Episode: "We All Scream for Ice Cream"
2007	Masters of Science Fiction	Juror #4 – Ginnie	Episode: "Little Brother"
2007	Tin Man	Young Azkadellia	3 episodes
2007	Kaya	Kristin	Main role; 10 episodes
2008	Left Coast	Bronwyn	Television film
2008	Gym Teacher: The Movie	Suzie	Television film
2009	Flashpoint	Ella Brandt	Episode: "Perfect Storm"
2010	The Cult	Rachel	Television film
2010	Fakers	Emma Archibald	Television film
2010	The 19th Wife	Five	Television film
2012	The Secret Circle	Eva	3 episodes
2012	Supernatural	Emma	Episode: "The Slice Girls"
2012	Midnight Sun	Miranda	Television film
2014	Red Widow	Bliss	2 episodes
2014	Motive	Janine Boxton	Episode: "Dead End"
2014–2015	Manhattan	Callie Winter	Main role (season 1); guest role (season 2); 15 episodes
2016	Bates Motel	Athena	Episode: "Lights of Winter"
2017	iZombie	Yvonne	Episode: "Some Like It Hot Mess"
2017	Dirk Gently's Holistic Detective Agency	Mona Wilder	3 episodes
