= Guns, Girls and Gambling =

2012 American action film

- DVD cover
- Directed by: Michael Winnick
- Written by: Michael Winnick
- Produced by: Michael Winnick; Henry Boger; Bob Yari
- Starring: Gary Oldman; Christian Slater; Megan Park
- Cinematography: Jonathan Hale
- Edited by: Robert A. Ferretti
- Music by: Jeff Cardoni
- Production companies: Yari Film Group; Freefall Films; Releaseme Productions
- Distributed by: Universal Studios
- Release dates: September 5, 2012 (Australia); January 8, 2013 (United States)
- Running time: 90 minutes
- Country: United States
- Language: English

Guns, Girls and Gambling is a 2012 American action crime thriller film written and directed by Michael Winnick. The film stars an ensemble cast, which includes Gary Oldman, Christian Slater, Megan Park, Helena Mattsson, Tony Cox, Chris Kattan, Powers Boothe, Michael and Eddie Spears, and Jeff Fahey.

== Plot ==
John Smith is down on his luck. His girlfriend left him for a doctor. A hooker steals his wallet at an Apache Reservation casino. He loses an Elvis Impersonation contest and later loses at poker with the four other impersonators: Gay Elvis, Little Person Elvis, Asian Elvis, and contest winner Elvis Elvis.

John is later apprehended by casino security, who think he stole a priceless ancient Apache mask from "The Chief", owner of the casino, with witnesses having seen an Elvis impersonator. The guards deduce that John didn't take it, so The Chief offers him $1,000,000 to find it.

A hitwoman, "The Blonde", who quotes Edgar Allan Poe before killing her victims, confronts Gay Elvis. She kills him, but does not find the mask.

John learns Elvis Elvis's address, and when he gets there, he meets Elvis's neighbor, Cindy. The mask isn't there, but they are attacked by another hitman, "The Cowboy", and his sidekick Mo. As they escape, John suggests calling the sheriff, but Cindy explains that the two sheriffs are corrupt, one working for The Chief and the other for "The Rancher". They encounter The Rancher, who explains that he hired the Elvises to steal the mask, which he used to own. A flashback reveals that, 30 years earlier, a man who worked for The Rancher had the mask, but he and his family were killed by Apaches. The Rancher offers John a $1,000,000 reward.

John and Cindy visit Asian Elvis, who demands they give him the mask. Another hitman, "The Indian", tomahawks Asian Elvis dead. They escape and head back to Elvis Elvis's, only to be confronted by Little Person Elvis, who demands the mask. Before he can shoot them, The Blonde appears and kills Little Person Elvis. John and Cindy escape, but The Sheriffs apprehend him for the three Elvis murders. They take John and Cindy with them to the desert, John having deduced that Elvis Elvis may be waiting there for a bus.

Elvis Elvis is the only passenger on the bus, the driver having stepped off, when The Blonde boards and shoots him. As he is dying he whispers something to her and she smiles broadly, taking his satchel with the mask. The Blonde finds the bus driver and kills him after he confirms he notified both The Rancher and The Chief.

John, Cindy, and The Sheriffs arrive later. The Blonde has left a message to bring the money and John to Station 12 – the isolated desert way station where the Apaches had killed the family. As they're leaving, The Cowboy and Mo show up. The Cowboy kills The Sheriffs, but The Indian appears and tomahawks The Cowboy and Mo. The Chief arrives, and the group head to Station 12 with his $1,000,000 briefcase.

They arrive just as The Rancher does, with his $1,000,000 briefcase. Cindy reveals that she is The Rancher's daughter and was following John in case he found the mask. When The Blonde emerges from the station, The Indian attacks, but she kills him. She tells the rest to send John in with the briefcases, or everyone will die.

When John enters the station, he and The Blonde embrace. The family that was killed in the flashback was John's. They had a Hopi housekeeper who hid John in the floorboards of the station and told the Apaches that he was dead. The Blonde is John's ex-girlfriend, who stuck around to help John get revenge for his family.

John and The Blonde tell The Rancher and The Chief why they are doing this. Also, she tells them that Elvis Elvis's dying words were that he destroyed the mask when he realized he wouldn't be able to sell it. She tells them she will return and kill anyone who retaliates. She leaves, with a briefcase and the hooker who stole John's wallet – she is actually the doctor that The Blonde left him for.

John leaves with his briefcase and the mask, which wasn't really destroyed. John returns it to his Hopi protector from 30 years earlier, finishing the job his father had started – returning the mask to her tribe, the rightful owners.

== Cast ==
- Christian Slater as John Smith
- Powers Boothe as The Rancher
- Dane Cook as Sheriff Hutchins
- Jeff Fahey as The Cowboy
- Chris Kattan as Gay Elvis
- Helena Mattsson as The Blonde
- Gary Oldman as Elvis Elvis
- Megan Park as Cindy
- Sam Trammell as Sheriff Cowley
- Anthony Brandon Wong as Asian Elvis
- Tony Cox as Little Person Elvis
- Matt Willig as The Indian (credited as Matthew Willig)
- Gordon Tootoosis as The Chief
- Heather Roop as Vivian
- Anthony Azizi as Mr. Crow
- Paulina Gretzky as The Deputy
- Mark Winnick as The College Kid

== Production ==
The film was first announced on June 17, 2010. Some of the filming occurred in Utah. On July 8, 2010, Megan Park was confirmed to have joined the cast.

On July 13, 2010, it was confirmed that Chris Kattan and Helena Mattsson had joined that cast. On July 14, 2010, Jeff Fahey was announced to have joined the cast.

Principal photography began on July 6, 2010.

The film is not rated. However, on Dish TV, it is rated NC-17.

== Release ==
The film was released on DVD in North America on January 8, 2013.
