= Scott Levine =

American computer criminal

Scott Levine is an American who on July 22, 2004, was charged with the largest computer crime indictment in United States history. Federal prosecutors alleged that Levine unlawfully accessed databases of consumer data aggregator Acxiom to steal detailed personal information about millions of people; 1.6 billion database records were stolen.

Levine, who had been the CEO of Snipermail.com, had accessed Acxiom's computers through a legitimately contracted account, but used a flaw in their security to increase his access. Prosecutors claim that he planned to aggregate the stolen data with Snipermail's existing database, and then offer to sell Snipermail to credit rating company Experian.

In Little Rock, Arkansas, on August 12, 2005, Levine was convicted of 120 counts of unauthorized access of a protected computer, two counts of access device fraud, and one count of obstruction of justice. He was sentenced on February 22, 2006, to 8 years in prison by U.S. District Judge William R. Wilson. He was released from prison in February 2012.

This was not the first time that Levine had run into problems with the law. Before Snipermail.com, he was a principal owner of a company called Friendly Power. On July 17, 1998, the Securities and Exchange Commission obtained an order halting ongoing sales of unregistered Friendly Power Company securities by three Florida boiler rooms and a group of Florida companies. The SEC alleged that the defendants fraudulently sold about $5 million of unregistered securities to approximately 300 mostly elderly investors.
