= Peeter Rebane =

Estonian film director and entrepreneur

Peeter Rebane (born 24 April 1973) is an Estonian film director, producer and entrepreneur.

== Education ==
He studied at Oxford University and graduated from Harvard University cum laude majoring in economics, psychology and visual arts. He has studied directing and film production at the University of Southern California, School of Cinematic Arts and has further trained at Judith Weston Studio For Actors And Directors. He is a co-founder of the film production company The Factory. In 2013, he was named Ernst & Young's Entrepreneur of the Year in Estonia.

== Directing ==
Rebane's directing portfolio includes feature films Sailing to Freedom (in development), documentaries Tashi Delek (2015), and Robbie Williams: Fans Journey to Tallinn (2014) and numerous music videos including for Moby's "Wait for Me", Pet Shop Boys' "Together", The Heft's "Born to Live", Liisi Koikson's "Üle Vee" and Daniel Lévi's "Summer Love". Together with Russell Thomas, Rebane directed and produced the concert film Robbie Williams: Live in Tallinn (2013). He also directed the 2021 film Firebird.

== TV and film production ==
Rebane was the producer of the 2002 Eurovision Song Contest, producer of the 23rd European Film Awards (2010), one of the initiators of the European Capital of Culture 2011 project and producer of the 20th anniversary concert of Estonia's re-independence for the President of Estonia.

== Concert production ==
BDG, founded by Rebane (and his brother, Priit), has produced hundreds of major events and concerts in the Baltic region.

== Other work ==
Rebane is a Member of the advisory board of the World Memory Film Project, has been a Member of the Board of Estonian Concert Promoters Association (2001–2011) and the President of Harvard Club of the Baltics (2004–2009).

== Personal life ==
Rebane is openly gay and is a civil rights activist who champions equal rights legislation of the LGBT community in Estonia.

From 2006 to 2016, he belonged to the Estonian Centre Party.
