= Corridor Digital =

American production studio

Corridor Digital LLC
- Industry: Entertainment
- Founded: October 9, 2009; 17 years ago
- Founders: Sam Gorski; Niko Pueringer
- Number of employees: 9 (January 2019)

YouTube information
- Channels: Corridor Digital; Corridor Crew
- Years active: 2010–present
- Subscribers: 10.1 million (Corridor Digital); 7.17 million (Corridor Crew)
- Views: 2.18 billion (Corridor Digital); 2.56 billion (Corridor Crew)
- Last updated: 25 August 2026
- Website: corridordigital.com

Corridor Digital LLC is an American independent production studio based in Los Angeles, known for creating pop-culture-related viral online short-form videos since 2010, as well as producing and directing the Battlefield-inspired web series Rush and the YouTube Premium series Lifeline.

As of November 2024, the channel has over ten million subscribers and has won awards at several Streamys, including the "Visual and Special Effects Award" in 2017. Its second channel, Corridor Crew, consists of behind-the-scenes content, including the popular series VFX Artists React and VFX Artist Reveals, the latter of which is hosted by Wren Weichman.

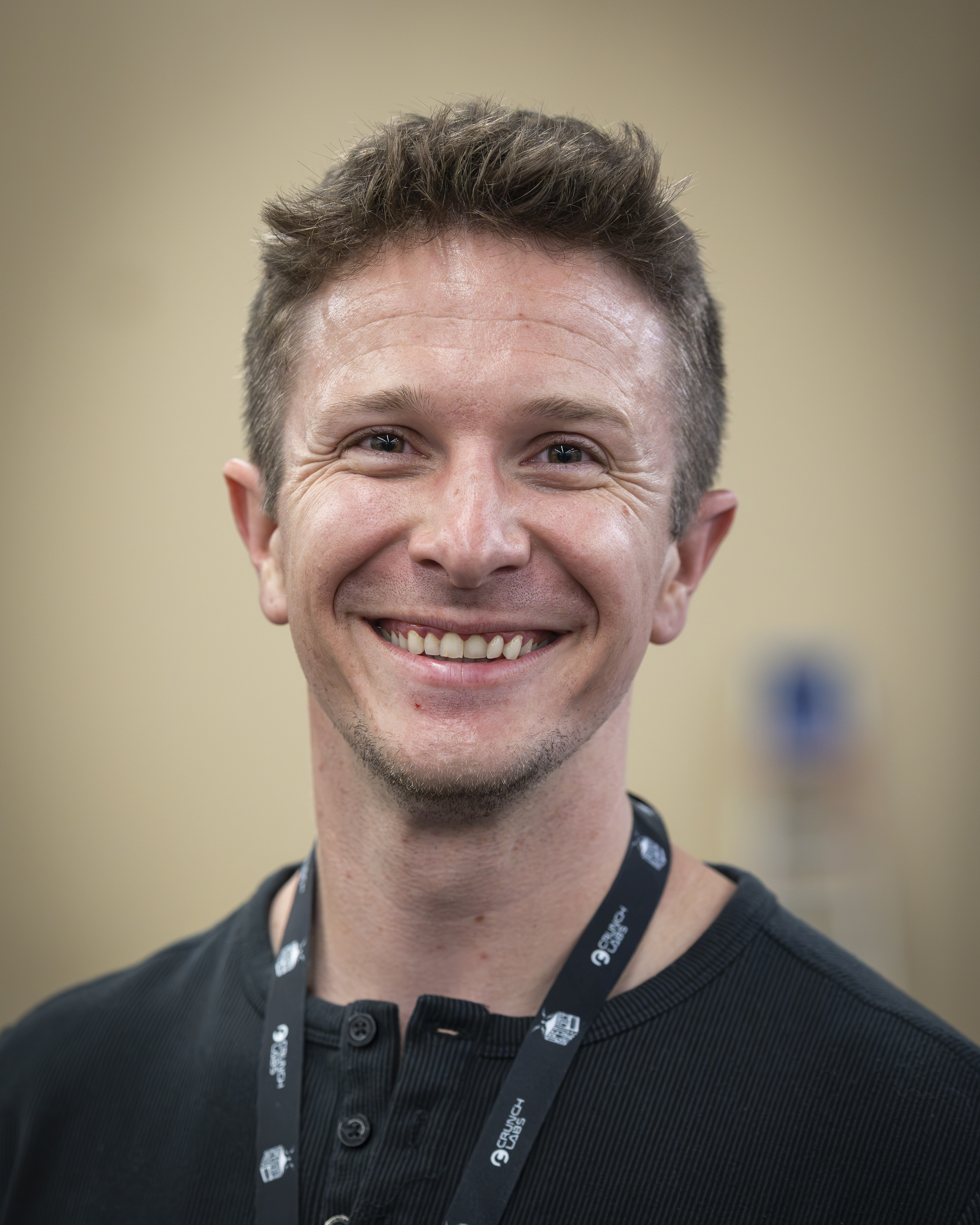
Wren Weichman, host of VFX Artist Reveals

== History and prominent projects ==
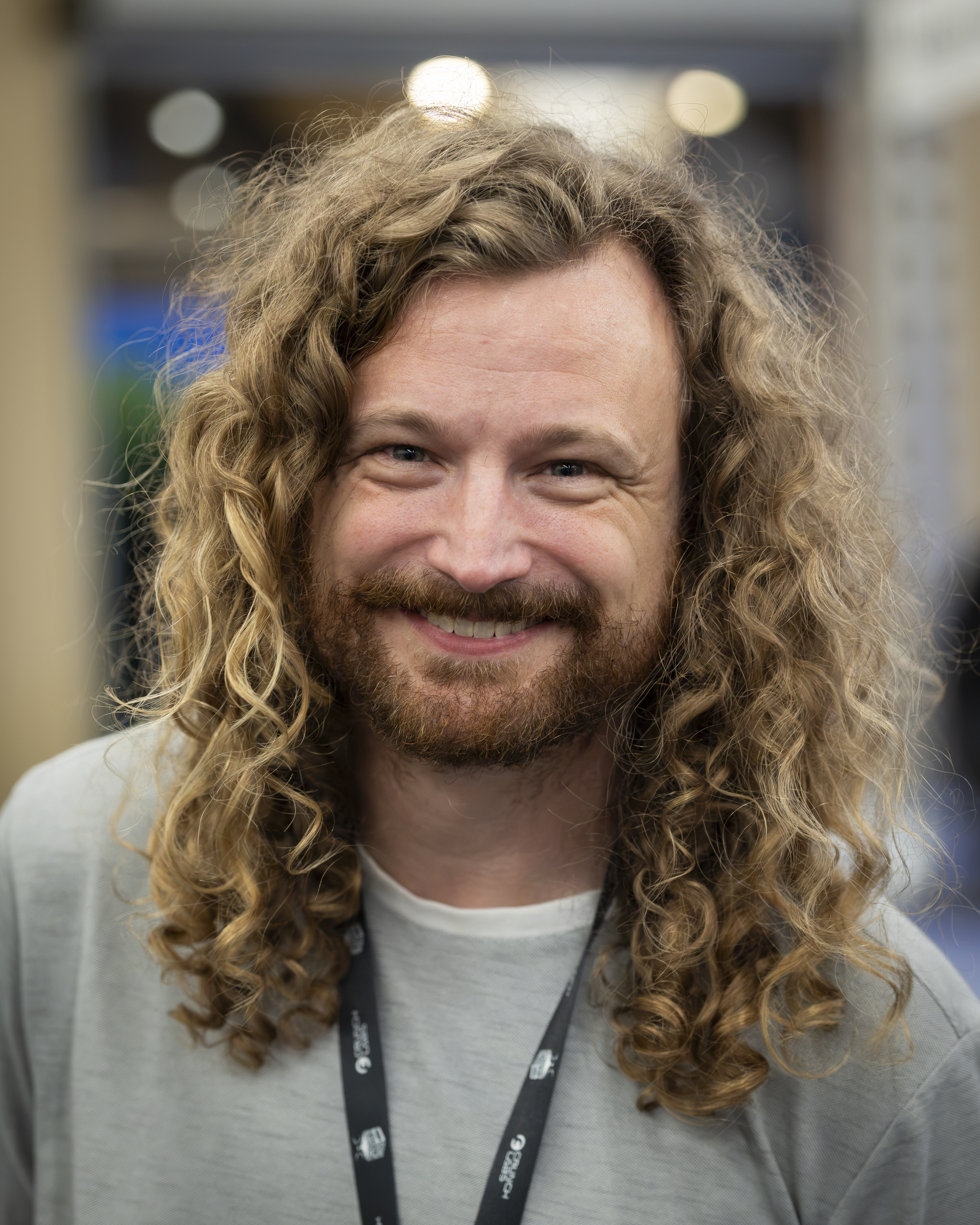
Niko Pueringer, co-founder of Corridor Digital

Pueringer and Gorski began working together in junior high school in Stillwater, Minnesota, making student films with an emphasis on visual effects. In 2008 they moved to Los Angeles, where they focused on visual effects for other projects. In 2010, they released a Modern Warfare fan film, "Modern Warfare: Frozen Crossing", like many of their early projects, it was filmed in Minnesota In subsequent years, Pueringer and Gorski began creating more short-form content. In 2012, they created the viral hits "The Glitch" and "Minecraft: The Last Minecart".

In 2016, they co-wrote, co-directed, and produced the Battlefield-inspired web series Rush.

=== Lifeline ===
In 2017, Corridor produced and directed the YouTube Red series Lifeline, which was executive produced by Dwayne Johnson and a collaboration with his Seven Bucks Productions. The show was an American science fiction drama television series broadcast on the YouTube Red network.

=== Top 10 Games You Can Play in Your Head, By Yourself ===
In 2019, the company published a book, Top 10 Games You Can Play in Your Head, By Yourself, released on Amazon and publicized with a commercial on its YouTube channel. The book is a collaboration between Gorski and author D. F. Lovett.

=== Boston Dynamics parody video ===
In June 2019, Corridor released a video in which a robot in the style of Boston Dynamics is abused in a variety of ways before finally fighting back against the humans attacking it. The video, watermarked "Bosstown Dynamics" instead of "Boston Dynamics", went viral across platforms, although most versions dropped attribution to the original source, with many claiming it to be an authentic Boston Dynamics video. Gizmodo wrote that the "real lesson from Corridor's fake robot video might be just how far [robot technology has] come in real life over the past decade".
