= Rocky Mountain Gun Owners =

US gun rights advocacy group

- Formation: 1996
- Tax ID no.: 84-1368137
- Legal status: 501(c)(4) nonprofit organization
- Headquarters: Loveland, Colorado, United States
- President: Dudley Brown
- Executive Director: Ian Escalante
- Chairman: Barry Walter
- Revenue: $432,682 (2015)
- Expenses: $514,915 (2015)
- Employees: 1 (2015)
- Website: www.rmgo.org

Rocky Mountain Gun Owners (RMGO) is a 501(c)(4) non-profit gun rights advocacy group in Colorado, United States.

The group has become known for aggressive lobbying activities that have made their issues prominent, particularly in primaries and candidate nominating assemblies and for its influence in firearms public policy such as concealed carry and constitutional carry legislation.

Rocky Mountain Gun Owners maintains that it is Colorado's only "no-compromise" gun rights lobby and adopts lobbying tactics that differ from other pro-gun organizations such as the National Rifle Association. The two organizations have exchanged heated criticisms of each other.

== History ==
Rocky Mountain Gun Owners was established in 1996 and has been registered with the Colorado Secretary of State's office since January 10, 1997. Dudley Brown, an NRA lobbyist throughout the early 1990s founded the group shortly after leaving the NRA state affiliate for being too lax on gun-control.

Dudley Brown is listed as the second most influential pro-gun advocate in America in Gunpowder Magazine's "Top 20 Most Influential Pro-Gun Advocates" article published in May 2023.

In the aftermath of the Columbine High School massacre, Brown represented RMGO in national news in support of gun rights amidst calls for more restrictions on firearms. RMGO organized opposition to a 2000 state ballot initiative known as Amendment 22 aimed at closing the purported "gun-show loophole" by requiring background checks at gun shows. Amendment 22 ultimately passed. The group also organized opposition and demonstrations against legislative measures supported by then Republican Governor Bill Owens to restricting firearms access, and campaigned against candidates down to local sheriff that they felt undermined gun issues.

== Conflict with the NRA ==
From its early years, RMGO has been at odds with other groups such as the National Rifle Association. RMGO has been recognized as "a gun-rights group so strident the National Rifle Association keeps its distance," and has accused the NRA of "squandering time and money" and "kissing up to politicians."

The NRA has retorted by discrediting Brown as "the Al Sharpton of the gun movement," and expressed frustration with attention given to "extreme right gun groups" such as RMGO.

The primary source of the tension has been reported as a difference in the lobbying tactics of the two groups. With NRA and its state affiliate Colorado State Shooting Association preferring a conventional lobbying or access-based approach, while RMGO electing to pursue a grassroots or confrontation-based approach. The group regularly accuses the NRA of not living up to its reputation.

The scope of the ideological differences was acknowledged more recently by Jim Merlino, former policy director for the Colorado Senate Democrats who observed: "Out here in Colorado, the National Rifle Association is considered a left-wing Washington-based organization. Instead of this Eastern establishment group, gun owners look to the Rocky Mountain Gun Owner as their voice in the legislature and Congress."

== The 2000s ==
In 2000, the group criticized the positions of Moderate Republican Candidates for the Colorado General Assembly in the lead up to the state Primary Election.

In 2003, RMGO was noted for its opposition to local county sheriffs revoking weapons permits issued by their predecessors. The group sought to address this issue and others through amendments to a concealed carry reform bill that year, however they ended up opposing the final bill due to added training requirements, and increased in the number of places off limits to weapons holders. Those provisions were acceptable to the NRA.

In 2004, the group lobbied for a bill that would have erased the Colorado Bureau of Investigation's database of concealed-weapons permit holders. Prior to 2007 permit holders were classified as "persons of interest" by the CBI. In 2007 the CBI moved permit holders out of that classification. Despite previous extensions of the law that allowed for the statewide database, the General Assembly did not renew the database and instead let it sunset.

== National affiliation ==
Rocky Mountain Gun Owners is an affiliate of the National Association for Gun Rights, a group that serves as an umbrella coordinator for various state-level pro-gun organizations. NAGR is also headed by Dudley Brown. The two organizations submitted a joint Amicus curiae brief to the United States Supreme Court for the landmark 2010 McDonald v. Chicago case that determined the Second Amendment applies to individual states. The RMGO et al. brief was cited in the court's opinion.

== Campus carry lawsuits ==
In 2010, RMGO filed a lawsuit against Colorado State University for their attempt to ban Concealed Weapons Permit holders from carry-on-campus. CSU subsequently rescinded their ban and the lawsuit was dropped.

RMGO also argued against a similar campus carry ban by the University of Colorado. In 2012 Colorado Supreme Court ruled that CU's ban on the lawful carry of firearms was illegal, citing RMGO's Amicus Brief in its ruling that under Colorado Law the school's Board of Regents should not have "authority to regulate concealed handgun possession on campus".

== Recent activities ==
In early 2012, the group was critical of Republican State Representative Jim Kerr's support of a measure that would have restricted gun sales on Sundays. Kerr sought appointment to a vacant State Senate seat that year, but Businessman Tim Neville was ultimately selected instead. At the state level, RMGO backed five gun bills during the 2012 legislative session.

In April 2012, RMGO presence was noted Colorado GOP convention, making firearms issues a prominent topic of discussion among delegates. RMGO threw their weight behind Randy Baumgardner in his race for Colorado Senate District 8 by opposing incumbent Republican Senator Jean White. RMGO's literature during the event called White's gun rights record into question and heralded Baumgardner for answering their survey 100%.

RMGO is an opponent of the Violence Policy Center, and calls their methods into question.

In 2012, the Denver Post accused the group of failing to file required documents with the Internal Revenue Service to maintain its tax-exempt status.

In 2013, RMGO assisted on the campaign to recall a Colorado State Senator, Evie Hudak, a democrat who voted in favor of more restrictive gun laws. The recall was cancelled when Senator Hudak resigned and was replaced by another Democratic Senator, Rachel Zenzinger. Senator Zenzinger lost her re-election bid in the midterm elections of 2014 to the RMGO-PAC endorsed Republican candidate, Laura J Woods. The effort of the RMGO-PAC on the 2014 midterm elections helped to change control of the Colorado State Senate from Democratic control to Republican control when three of their endorsed candidates won legislative seats.

In August 2014, the public library in Windsor, Colorado, had their "no-gun" policy challenged by RMGO. The challenge occurred after a local resident had been asked to leave the library after a patron noticed that the citizen had a concealed handgun on her person. The library had a "no weapons" sign posted on the door of the building and had a policy that prohibited the carrying of guns in the library. RMGO told the library that their policy was not in accordance with state law and unless they changed the policy, the library would face legal action. In September 2014, the library board voted unanimously to change their policy and now allows concealed carry permit holders to carry guns in the library.

In October 2014, RMGO launched a lawsuit against the Colorado Secretary of State to keep RMGO donor information private. In May 2019, RMGO filed a lawsuit against HB19-1177, the "red flag" gun law, arguing that "In this case, Democrats didn't see that they were violating the Constitution to pass a bill to violate the Constitution."

Rocky Mountain Gun Owners sued the state of Colorado over the 2013 ban on gun magazines arguing that it violates the constitution. On November 13, 2019 the Colorado Supreme Court heard oral arguments in the case. "For 138 years, the General Assembly never banned a single firearm or firearm component, HB-1224 is a departure from a 138-year tradition," said Barry Arrington, the attorney representing Rocky Mountain Gun Owners.

On July 8, 2020, Taylor Rhodes was appointed as RMGO's new Executive Director with former director Dudley Brown continuing as President of the organization.

In February 2023, Kevin Lorusso testified on behalf of Rocky Mountain Gun Owners during a Colorado legislature Committee session. Testimony by K. Lorusso devolved to racially charged comments and a mention of the Holocaust. The gun lobby later walked back those comments.

In 2024, then Executive Director Taylor Rhodes, left Rocky Mountain Gun Owners to become the Director of Communications for the affiliated group, National Association for Gun Rights. He was replaced by the Communications Director for RMGO, Ian Escalante.
