= Sara Gagliardi =

American politician

Member of the Colorado House of Representatives from the 27th district
- In office January 10, 2007 – January 12, 2011
- Preceded by: Bill Crane
- Succeeded by: Libby Szabo

Personal details
- Born: March 9, 1958 (age 68) Estherville, Iowa, U.S.
- Party: Democratic
- Spouse: Jack Gagliardi
- Children: Anthony Gagliardi; Gordon Lancaster; Christopher Lancaster
- Profession: Nurse
- Website: SaraGagliardi.org

Sara Elizabeth Gagliardi (born March 9, 1958) is an American nurse and politician who served as a legislator in the U.S. state of Colorado. A career nurse, Gagliardi was first elected as a Democrat in 2006 to the Colorado House of Representatives. She represented House District 27, which encompasses most of Arvada, Colorado, until her defeat in the 2010 election by Republican Libby Szabo. During her time with the House of Representatives, Gagliardi served as vice-chair for two legislative committees and successfully carried 22 bills into law, predominantly on health care, state services and education, and state fiscal issues. Following the recall attempt and subsequent resignation of Senator Evie Hudak in November 2013, Gagliardi announced her intention to be appointed to the office by the Democratic vacancy committee. The committee ultimately appointed Rachel Zenzinger.

== Biography ==
Born in Estherville, Iowa, Gagliardi graduated from high school in 1976 and attended Iowa Lakes Community College beginning in 1976, where she earned certification as a licensed practical nurse, a certification which she holds to this day. Gagliardi, at the time a single mother, worked full-time as a surgical nurse in the late 1970s and early 1980s with the Emmetsburg Community Hospital (now the Palo Alto County Hospital). Gagliardi moved to Colorado with her boys and worked for the Children's Hospital in Denver. In 1982, she also worked for the Wallace Village for Children, before beginning a 28-year career with Kaiser Permanente.

=== Involvement in Arvada ===
A resident of Arvada, Colorado, since the mid-1980s, Gagliardi has been a member of Spirit of Christ Catholic Church since 1989, where she frequently taught Sunday school. After marrying Jack Gagliardi and having her third son, Sara Gagliardi served on boards and committees in Arvada such as the accountability committee at Vanderhoof Elementary, the parent advisory committee at Drake Middle School, and the Arvada High School Boosters. She has been involved with education policy and has worked as a Cub Scout leader, a volunteer in the city, and as the chair of the Arvada Northwest Business and Professional Women's Committee. Gagliardi's joined the Service Employees International Union Local 105 during her professional career with Kaiser, as SEIU represented 5,000 similar workers in that industry. Later in her time with Kaiser, Gagliardi worked as a union steward for Local 105, monitoring and enforcing the provisions of the collective bargaining agreement between the company and the workers.

=== Political and professional career ===
Gagliardi entered politics working with Colorado State Senator Martha Ezzard in petitioning for the extradition of convicted murderer Daniel Arevalo. She volunteered with Gail Schoettler's gubernatorial campaign in 1998 and as senate district coordinator for Colorado State Senator Sue Windels in 2000, before running for the State House herself unsuccessfully in 2002. She has also worked on Denver and Arvada city council races, and campaigned for protecting or expanding education funding through Colorado's Amendment 23, and later Referendums C and D. Gagliardi was elected in 2006 and served four regular sessions, spanning the 66th and 67 General Assembly of the State of Colorado, from her swearing-in date in 2007 until her successor's in 2011.

Gagliardi has continued her employment as a nurse during her time at the statehouse. As Colorado's General Assembly operates between the extremes of a "citizen legislature" and a "professional legislature", a non-government job is often necessary to supplement the state's pay scale. Regular legislative sessions begin annually in January and constitutionally, they must last no more than 120 days. Though some committees do work through the interim, the period from mid-May until December allows members to keep seasonal jobs. Kaiser allowed Gagliardi to take a five-month unpaid leave of absence each year to discharge her legislative duties with the understanding that she would return after the session. Through most of her time with the House of Representatives, Gagliardi worked in a Denver-area dermatology clinic, although in 2010 she was moved into the field of oncology, where she has remained through the entire campaign season and post-election until the present.

== Legislative career ==
=== 2006 election ===
In 2006, Gagliardi aided by campaign manager Allen Weisheit, faced incumbent Republican Representative Bill Crane, in a rematch of the 2002 legislative elections, in which Gagliardi had received 46% of the vote against Crane and Libertarian Gregg Miller. During her 2006 run, however, she was endorsed by the Denver Post, and, in an exceptionally close election which was not decided until provisional ballots were counted, Gagliardi eventually was declared the winner, having narrowly defeated Crane by 111 votes. This was less than one half of one percent of the total votes cast in the district. The race, being the narrowest legislative election in Colorado that year, set the stage for a series of close uphill elections for Gagliardi in a district with more registered Republicans than Democrats.

=== 2007 legislative session ===
In the 2007 session of the Colorado General Assembly, Gagliardi sat on the House Health and Human Services and the House Local Government Committee. Gagliardi was the prime sponsor for 8 bills in the House and 3 in the Senate during her first session.

Gagliardi's most high-profile bill during the 2007 session was also her most controversial. HB-1303 was a measure to create a statewide "no-junk-mail" registry, similar to the successful National Do Not Call Registry. After opposition by some Colorado businesses and the U.S. Postal Service, the bill was killed in a House committee, at her request, to allow the measure to be revised and reintroduced in future sessions. Following the session, Gagliardi also joined an effort to deter purveyors of spam email from operating in the state of Colorado.

Gagliardi also offered an amendment to the state budget to provide additional funding for veterans homes in Colorado, and was one of the few Democrats to vote against a plan pushed by Gov. Bill Ritter to freeze property tax rates to provide additional public school funding. Rep. Gagliardi was also a co-sponsor of Senate bills to provide legal immunity to school staff who intervene to stop disruptive behavior, and an unsuccessful measure to revise rules regarding the expiration of frequent flier miles. Gagliardi sponsored a few health care measures which overlapped her personal experience, but most of her remaining bills were sunset reviews and statutory cleanup bills, as is common for incoming legislators who are learning legislative procedure.

Near the start of the 2007 legislative session, Gagliardi also adopted an "open door" policy for the Capitol and invited any resident of her district to visit her office at the Capitol or shadow her during floor and committee work. She developed email and print newsletters, similar to those offered by members of Congress, for distribution to her constituents each month during her time with the House of Representatives.

=== 2008 legislative session ===
In the 2008 session of the Colorado General Assembly, Gagliardi returned to the committee assignments from the previous session, sitting on the House Health and Human Services and the House Local Government Committee. Gagliardi was the prime sponsor for 7 bills in the House and she sponsored 5 from the Senate, in addition to numerous co-sponsorships. Gagliardi was joined in 2008 by chief of staff Ian Silverii, a Democrat with experience in politics and education policy. In addition to her legislative duties, Gagliardi held a series of town hall style meetings on issues of importance to her district.

Gagliardi and Representative Mark Ferrandino proposed the "American Dream Protection Act of 2008," which would have allowed judges to delay home foreclosures by 90 days, in response to the ongoing subprime mortgage crisis which was affecting Colorado and the United States more generally. After encountering overwhelming legislative opposition to the bill, which was characterized in committee as being too drastic, the bill was amended to instead increase public outreach efforts to avoid foreclosures, and more stringent notification requirements for banks when foreclosing. The bill was eventually adopted by the General Assembly, and as signed into law by Governor Ritter, the measure required mortgage holders to provide 30 days' notice to homeowners before beginning foreclosure proceedings and provide them with contact information for the Colorado Foreclosure Prevention Hotline.

During the session, Gagliardi also sponsored legislation to expand funding for the Colorado Responds to Children with Special Needs (CRCSN) Program by increasing the cost of birth certificates by $0.75. This measure, once adopted, provided about $200,000 annually to the program which works to prevent birth defects and developmental disabilities, and supports those who suffer from these disabilities.

Gagliardi sponsored two measures to allow Medicaid reimbursements for services provided by advanced practice nurses in Colorado; both were passed into law and signed by Governor Ritter in March 2008. She also sponsored a successful bill to revise property tax collection procedures in conjunction with tax increment financing to give local governments more budgeting flexibility through the down economy.

In July, following the legislative session, Gagliardi announced a proposal to lower the age limit for blood donations to 16 throughout the state.

=== 2008 election ===
Gagliardi sought a second term in the legislature in the 2008 statewide elections, facing Republican John Bodnar whose bid to unseat Labuda was endorsed by the Denver Post; the Arvada Press endorsed Gagliardi. Gagliardi was again joined by campaign manager Allen Weisheit, and as in previous elections, she was competing for a seat with voter registration numbers favoring Republicans; again her race was expected to be strongly contested. Gagliardi prevailed with just over 50 percent of the popular vote, some 1600 votes ahead of Bodnar; American Constitution Party candidate Amanda Campbell took 4 percent of the vote.

=== 2009 legislative session ===
For the 2009 legislative session, Gagliardi was named to a seat on the House Business Affairs and Labor Committee and as vice-chair of the House Health and Human Services Committee. Following her re-election, Gagliardi was also nominated for the post of House Majority Caucus Chair, but the post ultimately went to Representative Karen Middleton. Representative Gagliardi was the prime sponsor of 5 bills in the House of Representatives and 7 bills in the Colorado State Senate, in addition to co-sponsoring many other bills and resolutions.

Gagliardi carried House Bill 1331 in 2009 which created tax credits for the purchase of fuel efficient vehicles in the state of Colorado. The credits incentivized the purchase of plug-in vehicles, hybrid vehicles, plug-in hybrids, plug-in hybrid conversions, and CNG conversions. These tax credits had the dual benefits of bolstering the automotive dealership industry in Colorado and creating jobs in the field of vehicle conversion.

In addition to working on lower-profile issues during the 2009 session, Gagliardi sponsored a bipartisan measure to lower the age limit for blood donations to 16. The measure was crafted through collaboration between Gagliardi, Bonfils Blood Center, and Connor Randall, a high school student from Arvada and two-time heart transplant recipient. The three stakeholders recognized that blood donations could be increased by as much as 35% if the donation age were lowered with parental consent. Gagliardi, being vice chair of Health and Human Services and a nurse, introduced the bill and co-prime sponsored the measure together with Republican Representative Spencer Swalm to showcase the bipartisan nature of the bill. Representative Swalm, a frequent donor to Bonfils and advocate for organ and tissue donation helped lobby the measure among the Republican caucus. Gagliardi leaned on her experience as a nurse in a series of letters to the editor and opinion pieces advocating for the change and encouraging Coloradans to donate blood. The bill passed and was subsequently signed into law on March 19, 2009.

Gagliardi also carried a bipartisan measure with Republican Senator Don Marostica which created the Colorado Credit Reserve Program. The program leveraged $2.5 million of state funds to provide between $50 – $55 million in loans for small businesses in the state of Colorado. The bill required a large fiscal investment up-front, but will cost the state very little, even in a worst-case situation. The bill was particularly necessary during the early stages of the recession, as credit markets were inaccessible to many businesses, yet the bill's impact has continued. As of October 2010, the measure had opened credit to 167 businesses, allowed for the creation of 1,100 jobs, and become a source of net income for the state of Colorado.

=== 2010 legislative session ===
In January 2010, Gagliardi was named vice-chair of the House Business Affairs and Labor Committee, replacing Rep. Ed Casso. Gagliardi was the only Sophomore legislator in the Colorado House to hold two vice-chair positions at the same time. For the 2010 legislative session, Gagliardi was the prime sponsor for 8 bills originating in the House of Representatives and 12 additional measures originating the Senate, thus making it her most legislatively-productive session. Gagliardi was joined in 2010 by chief of staff Kevin J.D. Wilson, a political independent who had served on her staff since 2008. In addition to her committee positions through 2010, Gagliardi had also worked between 2009 and 2010 on a number of interim committees, the most important of which being the Economic Opportunity and Poverty Reduction Task Force, headed by Representative John Kefalas. Gagliardi's own experiences as a struggling single parent in the 1980s helped to drive her interest in the committee's work. Tasked with cutting the state's poverty rate in half in a decade, the committee's recommendations focused on providing social services that end cycles of poverty and providing broad economic opportunities to all who live in the state.

For a fourth year, Gagliardi continued to hold town hall meetings in Arvada every month on topics such as jobs legislation, alternative education and apprenticeships, the national economy, the state budget, education policy, and energy policy. She also hosted meetings with the Jefferson County School Board, job fairs, and an informational meeting on starting a new business, as well as twice-monthly informal "constituent coffee" meetings at coffee shops in Arvada. Gagliardi and her staff also adopted a policy of responding individually to emails coming from any of the district's 78,500 people.

Working on the state's budget consumed much of the 2010 legislative session for most members. Colorado's projected budget shortfalls for the 2010-2011 fiscal year were substantial and obvious cuts had been made in years prior. All functions of state government had undergone cuts in previous sessions, but the ongoing reductions in state spending also threatened to defund numerous departments and functions of government. Gagliardi agreed with many additional cuts in the state's budget, but argued extensively against further reductions in spending for education, infrastructure, and "social safety net" programs. To prevent these cuts, she voted with many fellow Democrats to close tax loopholes and end certain business tax exemptions which altogether totaled more than $110,000,000 annually. Her support for these measures made her the target of attack ads and coordinated letters to the editor condemning her position as a violation of TABOR and a tax hike during a recession.

Most of Gagliardi's measures were unrelated to the budget, however. Gagliardi sponsored an overhaul of the state's food stamp system, now known as SNAP with centrist Jefferson County Republican Ken Summers. The measure, House Bill 1022, underwent extensive revisions due to its contentious nature. As introduced, it would have expanded food stamp eligibility, removed an asset test, extended the certification period for food assistance, and created an outreach plan to pair private volunteer groups with the government in order to promote awareness of SNAP and to help counties deal with increased caseloads. Though the original bill proved monstrously expensive given the state's dire economic forecast, subsequent amendments brought costs under control while still preserving the core of the measure. After a lengthy period in negotiation, the measure was passed 52-10 in the House, and 22-12 in the Senate. Once signed into law, 1022 became the new backbone of Colorado's food assistance program.

Gagliardi also sponsored the Colorado Health Services Corps Act of 2010 which provides loan repayment assistance to medical professionals who agree to work in poor or underserved areas of the state. Among her other bills during the 2010 session, Gagliardi also sponsored a "sensible government" bill to help minors in the foster care system register for drivers education, a measure to allow doctors to override health insurance companies when choosing oncology medicines, and a measure to register surgical technologists following the Rose Medical Center Hepatitis C Incident of 2009.

=== 2010 election ===
Arvada, which contained more registered Republicans than Democrats, was one area heavily targeted by Colorado Republicans hoping to make gains during the midterm 2010 legislative elections. Gagliardi was joined by campaign managers Allen Weisheit and Elliot Goldbaum and treasurer Dave Fischer as well as a sizable group of volunteers from Arvada.

Both Gagliardi and Republican challenger Libby Szabo engaged in extensive fundraising and spent similar amounts on their campaigns. Gagliardi's campaign relied heavily on face-to-face interaction, as it had in previous elections. By the end of October 2010, Gagliardi had visited 14,725 constituents at their homes, over 5,000 of which in 2010 alone. Though Gagliardi received many local endorsements, Szabo's endorsement by national Republican figures raised the race's publicity substantially. On October 15, The Denver Post endorsed Szabo's bid for Colorado's 27th House District. Later the same day the Arvada Press released their endorsements, and while they praised Gagliardi heavily for her constituent outreach, they endorsed Szabo's bid for "radical changes." Gagliardi's campaign continued to run on her record of legislative accomplishments, despite being hammered by attack ads from her opponent, all while 527 groups poured money into the district trying change the electoral outcome.

On Tuesday, November 2, 2010, Szabo defeated Gagliardi in a three-way race after emerging with 51% of all votes cast in Colorado's 27th House District.

== Life after politics ==
After the end of her tenure as a state representative, Gagliardi returned to work as a nurse for Kaiser Permanente in the field of oncology. She has remained involved in Colorado politics, writing opinion pieces on public health and paid sick days, as well as periodically working with state legislators.

Following the recall attempt and subsequent resignation of Senator Evie Hudak in November 2013, Gagliardi announced her intention to seek the office. Because the vacancy was created by a resignation, rather than an electoral defeat, a party vacancy committee will internally elect and then subsequently appoint a replacement to the Senate seat. Gagliardi and Arvada Councilwoman Rachel Zenzinger both announced their candidacies for the office, which will again be up for election in 2014.
