= Dudley Brown =

American gun rights lobbyist

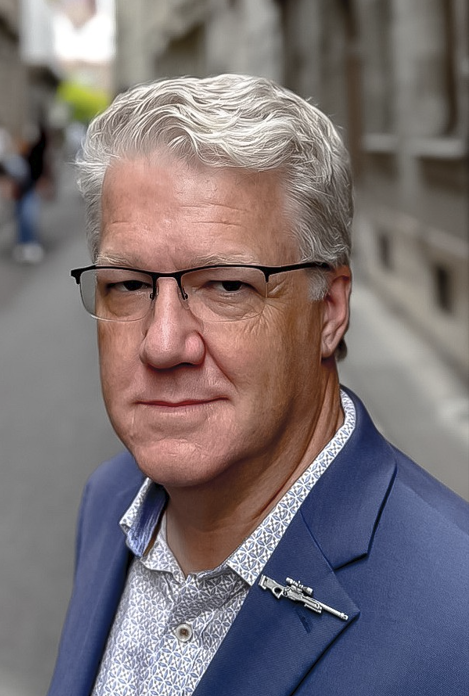
- Brown in 2025
- Born: 1965 (age 60–61)
- Occupations: President of Rocky Mountain Gun Owners; President of National Association for Gun Rights
- Known for: Gun rights activism
- Political party: Republican

Dudley W. Brown (born 1965) is an American gun rights lobbyist. He is the founder and president of Rocky Mountain Gun Owners and president of the National Association for Gun Rights.

== Early life ==
Brown was raised in South Dakota. Brown became politically active in his college years, where he founded the Colorado State University campus chapter of College Republicans and was elected chairman of College Republicans of Colorado.

Brown attended, but did not graduate from, Colorado State University. In 2013, after being questioned about his educational history, Brown changed his biography on his organization's web page to reflect that he had not received a college degree. He reported that he was one credit shy of a degree but participated in the 1989 graduation ceremonies.

Prior to becoming a pro-gun lobbyist, Brown worked in various political positions, including for the United States Senate as Colorado U.S. Senator William L. Armstrong's Northern Colorado Director and as the Media Director for the Colorado House of Representatives Republican Party caucus.

== Political career ==
Brown is a critic of the anti-gun lobby and its interest groups like the Violence Policy Center.

A 2014 Denver Post article listed Brown as the 24th most powerful person in Denver, Colorado.

=== Rocky Mountain Gun Owners ===
Brown founded the Colorado organization Rocky Mountain Gun Owners in 1996 as a "no-compromise" alternative to other pro-gun organizations. In the wake of the Columbine High School massacre, Colorado voters passed Amendment 22, a voter-initiated measure requiring background checks of gun purchases at gun shows, closing the gun show loophole. Brown opposed the initiative, stating, "We're under assault right now. We feel like the Jews did in Nazi Germany." In 2002, a complaint was filed against Brown with the Colorado Secretary of State, alleging that a fund-raising letter he wrote supporting the congressional campaign of Marilyn Musgrave violated state law. The complaint claimed that, "As a registered lobbyist, Mr. Brown is clearly prohibited from fund-raising while the General Assembly is in session." Brown called the complaint "frivolous".

Brown is known for involving his organization in Republican Party (GOP) primary elections at the state and local levels. In 2012, during a change of leadership in the Colorado State Legislature, Brown supported a pro-gun Senator to take the place of one he felt was not supportive of Second Amendment rights. The state senator whose loyalty to the Second Amendment was called into question called Brown "the most dangerous man in Republican politics."

At the Colorado GOP convention in April 2012, RMGO and Brown supported pro-gun candidates and spoke out against those whom they considered anything less. The impact of Brown and RMGO on the 2012 election in Colorado was that nine out of eleven of their endorsed candidates won the general election.

In opposition to the Colorado Legislature's gun control legislation in 2013, Brown mobilized thousands of supporters at the capitol building in Denver and also testified before the Senate Judiciary Committee.

In 2013, Brown and RMGO assisted on the campaign to recall a Colorado State Senator, Evie Hudak, a Democrat who voted in favor of more restrictive gun laws. The recall was cancelled when Senator Hudak resigned and was replaced by another Democratic Senator, Rachel Zenzinger. Senator Zenzinger lost her re-election bid in the midterm elections of 2014 to the RMGO endorsed Republican candidate, Laura Woods. In October 2014, Brown and RMGO launched a lawsuit against the Colorado Secretary of State to keep RMGO donor information private.

During the 2014 midterm elections, three of RMGO's candidates won legislative seats, helping Republicans take control of the Colorado State Senate, which Democrats had controlled for ten years.

In 2015, the Colorado State Legislature considered legislation that would bump the magazine limit enacted in 2013 from 15 rounds to 30 rounds. Brown opposed the legislation, arguing that 30 rounds per magazine isn't enough. Brown's opposition to the increased magazine limit drew criticism from fellow gun rights activists. Luc Hatlestad of 5280 magazine wrote that conservatives were questioning whether Brown "is more committed to the money his activism earns him than the alleged principles behind his supposedly high-minded crusade."

Rocky Mountain Gun Owners sued the state of Colorado over the 2013 ban on gun magazines arguing that it violates the constitution. On November 13, 2019 the Colorado Supreme Court heard oral arguments in the case. "For 138 years, the General Assembly never banned a single firearm or firearm component, HB-1224 is a departure from a 138-year tradition," said Barry Arrington, the attorney representing Rocky Mountain Gun Owners.

Rocky Mountain Gun Owners opposes Colorado's "Red Flag" gun confiscation law, HB 1177, which went into effect January 1, 2020. The law was abused almost as soon as it was enacted when a petition was filed against Colorado State University Police officer Phillip Morris on January 9, 2020. The petitioner Susan Holmes, claimed that she shared her child Jeremy Holmes, with the officer who shot him in self defense on July 1, 2017.

'It will be used as a tool of revenge, and that's what Ms. Holmes was trying to do,' Brown said. 'We need to thank Ms. Holmes for showing us this law is a disaster.'"

=== National Association for Gun Rights ===
In 2013 the National Association for Gun Rights became aware of a gun control bill being negotiated between the National Rifle Association of America (NRA) and democratic Senator Joe Manchin of West Virginia.

The resulting "Manchin-Toomey" Bill failed to reach the required supermajority of 60 votes to be considered for passage.

At the national level, Brown's group has outspent the NRA in political lobbying, spending $1.9 million compared to the NRA's $700,000 for the first quarter of 2013. NAGR also ran ads attacking Eric Cantor for his stance on gun policy.

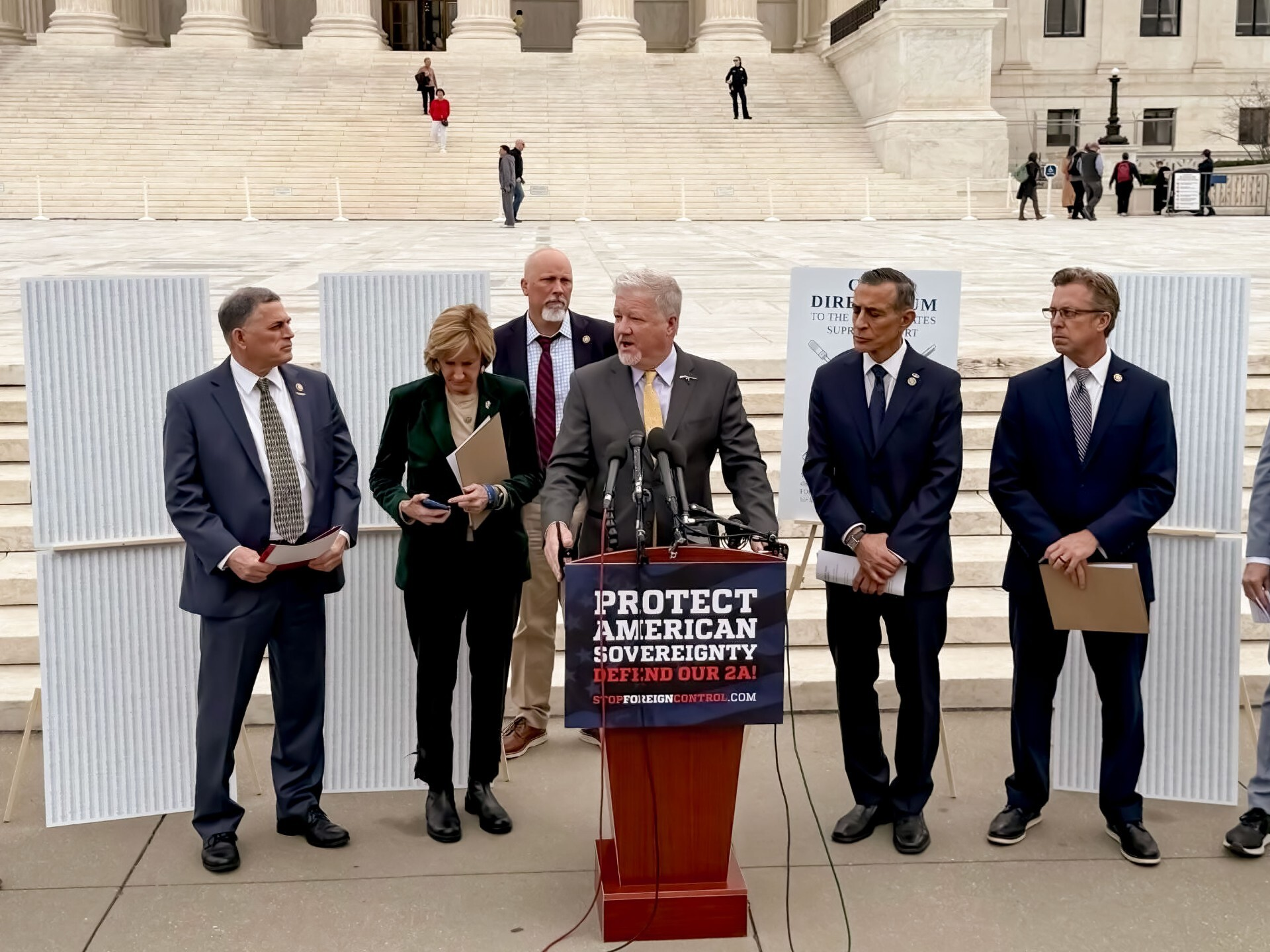
Brown leading a conference with members of congress in front of the Supreme Court in 2024

Brown was involved in the debate during the Rules Committee meeting at the 2012 Republican Convention in Tampa, Florida. The rules committee voted for an entire set of revised rules, which James Hohmann of Politico claims were "negotiated behind the scenes by Romney's surrogates".

Brown and NAGR opposed the nomination of Loretta Lynch for U.S. Attorney General.

Brown and NAGR have also criticized gun control advocacy groups such as Moms Demand Action. NAGR and Moms Demand Action have fought over private businesses allowing guns in their stores.

In March 2015, Brown and NAGR supported constitutional carry in Kansas.

The Huffington Post described the National Association for Gun Rights as "The much leaner, more pugnacious version of the NRA. Where the NRA has looked to find some common ground with gun reform advocates and at least appear to be reasonable, NAGR has been the unapologetic champion of opening up gun laws even more."

The National Association for Gun Rights' legal arm, the National Foundation for Gun Rights, donated over $50,000 to benefit Kyle Rittenhouse. This was gathered from over 1000 donations made to the foundation expressly for him. Rittenhouse is being held on charges that he allegedly shot and killed two people and wounded a third on August 25, 2020 during civil unrest in Kenosha, Wisconsin. "The left is doing everything in their power to portray a 17-year-old kid as the villain," said Dudley Brown. "We believe Kyle acted legally and defended himself from a dangerous group of armed thugs whose clear intent was to cause permanent harm."

Following the acquittal of Kyle Rittenhouse, the National Foundation for Gun Rights released this statement, "When we saw the video evidence of Kyle defending himself and others in Kenosha, WI, NFGR made the decision to support him right away, and we're thrilled to see that he is now a free man," NFGR Executive Director Dudley Brown.

== Political views ==
Brown has been a vocal critic of the National Rifle Association, saying they are soft on gun control issues.

Brown and RMGO in August 2014 protested the gun-ban at a local Colorado library, sending the library a cease and desist order.

Brown was quoted in a 2014 Mother Jones article, in response to the reporter's efforts to receive an interview, saying, "I don't talk to leftists like you. My guys don't read your crap." The article then states Brown brushed past the reporter, yelled "Pravda" over his shoulder and moved into the crowd.

In 2014, Brown was quoted in the Los Angeles Daily News opposing gun buyback programs.

In a 2014 Human Events article, Brown expressed his approval of a verdict to allow guns on Idaho college campuses.

Mother Jones described Brown as "the face and voice of the absolutist gun-rights movement, which opposes any and all gun-related restrictions."

When the Los Angeles Times reported in 2017 that armed civilians hampered a police investigation at a shooting in a Thornton, Colorado Walmart, Dudley Brown responded "This is a part of the job of police — to investigate what happened, not highlight that patrons were legally armed," he said. "In that situation, what are people supposed to do? Lay down on the floor and draw chalk marks around themselves?" "I'd rather be armed with a gun and not need it, than to be not armed and be in a situation where one is needed," he said.

In a 2019 Politico article, NAGR president Dudley Brown described the differences between his organization and the NRA "As an organization, we don't use Gucci-loafered lobbyists in Washington, D.C. in $200,000 wardrobes to grease the palms of weak-kneed politicians to vote right," said Dudley Brown, president of the National Association for Gun Rights, referencing the NRA chief executive's purported lavish spending. "Instead, we activate our members to do that lobbying for us and for them. That's the power in a grassroots lobby and NRA lost that a long time ago."

In a May 2023 New York Times article, Brown commented on the 2022 Supreme Court's Bruen decision, "Dudley Brown, the president of the National Association for Gun Rights, which opposes any restrictions on gun ownership, said the Bruen decision was a bulwark against regulation and would help his organization win a host of lawsuits against gun restrictions. But he said that even with the Bruen ruling, a monumental victory in the Supreme Court, the fight would be playing out for years in state legislatures and lower courts that now have to interpret the decision. 'It often feels like one step forward, two steps back,' he said."

== Reception ==
Brown firing HK MP5

In August 2013, NAGR and Dudley Brown were profiled in a 5280 magazine story. According to the article, Brown "savagely and routinely attacks candidates and officeholders unwilling to pledge, in writing, their absolute loyalty to Brown on Second Amendment issues." NAGR was described as a "fund-raising machine that bullies anyone who compromises Brown's pro-gun, anti-abortion, anti-gay agenda." Former Colorado Republican State Representative B.J. Nikkel said Brown "is a political terrorist and a modern-day charlatan who operates in the shadows and portrays himself as a supposed 'Christian,' but he uses the people naive enough to believe him and financially support him."

Brown has been criticized for his fundraising practices. Sean Tonner, deputy chief of staff for former Republican Colorado Governor Bill Owens, said Brown "makes his money when there's turmoil, real or perceived, because that's what gets his members to write him checks." Ammoland wrote that Brown's "rhetoric has done more to marginalize Second Amendment activism than all of the slanders from gun prohibition lobbying groups combined."

Brown appears as himself in the 2014 documentary "Rocky Mountain Heist."

Dudley Brown is listed as the second most influential pro-gun advocate in America in Gunpowder Magazine's "Top 20 Most Influential Pro-Gun Advocates" article published in May 2023.

== See also ==
- Gun politics in the United States
- Gun Owners of America
