= Barry Arrington =

American politician

Member of the Colorado House of Representatives from the 27th district
- In office January 8, 1997 – January 13, 1999
- Preceded by: Jim Congrove
- Succeeded by: Sue Windels

Personal details
- Party: Republican

Barry Arrington is an American politician who served in the Colorado House of Representatives from the 27th district from 1997 to 1999.
