= Golden Transcript =

Newspaper in Golden, Colorado

- Type: Weekly newspaper
- Format: Tabloid
- Owner: Colorado Community Media
- Founder: George West
- Publisher: Linda Shapley
- Staff writers: Corinne Westeman
- Founded: December 19, 1866
- Headquarters: 750 W. Hampden Ave; Suite 225; Englewood, CO 80110; United States
- Sister newspapers: Wheat Ridge Transcript
- Website: goldentranscript.net

The Golden Transcript is the second oldest continuously published newspaper in Colorado, behind the Central City Register-Call. The Transcript is also the oldest media outlet of the Denver metropolitan area. It is published by Colorado Community Media.

== History ==
=== Origins ===
George West was born in New Hampshire and at an early age entered the printer's trade. He apprenticed at the Boston Transcript and became on of the proprietors of the Boston Stereotype Foundry. In early 1858, the Boston Trading Company was formed with West as president. Later that year, the group gathered supplies in Independence, Missouri, and set out to profit in the Colorado Gold Rush.

Seven of the 15 men turned back after meeting disillusioned miners near Fort Kearny but West continued on to Colorado. Upon reaching Cherry Creek, Colorado, West was recruited by William N. Byers to set type for the first edition of the Rocky Mountain News. West's group reached Golden, Colorado, on June 12, 1859. West leased a local print shop and published the first issue of the Western Mountaineer on Dec. 4, 1859. That spring, West surrender his lease and returned to Boston where he sold his interest in the stereotype foundry. He then returned to Golden and resumed publication of the Western Mountaineer, which ceased on Dec. 20, 1860.

West then worked in moving cargo between Golden and St. Joseph, Missouri, until 1862, when he enlisted in the Union army, serving as captain of Company F of the 2nd Colorado Cavalry Regiment during the American Civil War. He was discharged in early 1865. West returned to Colorado and was hired as city editor at the Denver News.

=== West family ===
On December 19, 1866, West launched another paper in Golden called the Colorado Transcript. In 1887, Gov. Alva Adams appointed him as adjutant general of the Colorado National Guard. He led troops in the Ute War of 1887 his actions earned him the nickname "Give 'Em Hell West." West published the Transcript until his death in 1906 at age 80. His son Harley D. West succeeded his father as editor and died in 1927 following an operation for an appendicitis. His widow Vera (Parshall) West then became editor. In 1929, she remarried to H. Fleet Parsons who then joined her as co-editor. In 1934, Camp George West was named after the paper's founder. In 1952, Mrs. Parsons West died at age 70. In 1959, Parsons died at age 80. His son Harley Parsons sold his interest in the Transcript to his mother and sister, who in 1960 resold it to John Jameson.

=== Other owners ===
The paper was acquired by Charles E. Donnelly, Jr. in 1963. Earl Howey became co-owner in 1964, and the two sold the paper in 1965 to William C. "Bill" King. In 1968, King sold a controlling interest in the Transcript to Great Bend Publishing Co., owner of the Great Bend Tribune and a subsidiary of The Kansas City Star. In March 1969, the Colorado Transcript was expanded into a daily newspaper and renamed to the Golden Daily Transcript. In 1970, Jerry Emerson succeeded King as publisher. In 1975, Emerson and the company sold the paper to Robert L. "Bob" Edwards.

In 1978, John G. Montgomery, owner of the Junction City Daily Union, purchased the paper. In 1979, the paper reverted from a daily to a twice-weekly. In 1983, Jerry Brock and James Adkins, owners of the Douglas County News-Press, acquired he paper, and soon renamed it from The Colorado Transcript to The Golden Transcript. In 1985, former owner Montgomery died at age 82. In 1987, Bob Short became co-owner. After a two year legal dispute, Brock bought out Short and in 1996 sold the Transcript for $1.1 million to Price Cobb, Vince Bodiford and Joe Manvilia.

The Transcript was operated under the firm Golden Media Inc., which in 1998 merged with a rival subsidiary called Jeffco Publishing Co. Inc., which published the Lakewood Sentinel. The Transcript chain has a circulation of 15,000 and the Sentinel chain has a circulation of 12,000. The combined enterprise was valued at $3 million and its parent company was Midwest Newspapers Inc. The company, owned by Michael Gartner and Gary G. Gerlach, later became New West Newspapers, Inc. In 2006, the company sold all of its Colorado titles to Jackalope Publishing, led by Scott D. Perriman of MetroNorth Newspapers. Jackalope Publishing was formed by Kimberly Carmichael to buy Mile High Newspapers. In 2011, Perrmian died at age 43.

At some point Perriman's newspapers came under the ownership of Colorado Community Media, owned by Jerry and Ann Healey. In May 2021, The Colorado Sun and nonprofit organization the National Trust for Local News became joint owners of the Transcript along with over a dozen more local newspapers.
