= The Mentalist season 1 =

The Mentalist
- Season 1
- DVD cover
- No. of episodes: 23

Release
- Original network: CBS
- Original release: September 23, 2008 – May 19, 2009

Season chronology
- Next → Season 2

The first season of The Mentalist premiered on September 23, 2008 and concluded on May 19, 2009. It consisted of 23 episodes. Patrick Jane, a former fraudulent psychic, works as an independent consultant for the California Bureau of Investigation (CBI). He uses acute observation and psychological manipulation to solve homicides while hunting Red John, the serial killer who murdered his wife and daughter.

== Cast and characters ==
=== Main cast ===
- Simon Baker as Patrick Jane
- Robin Tunney as Teresa Lisbon
- Tim Kang as Kimball Cho
- Owain Yeoman as Wayne Rigsby
- Amanda Righetti as Grace Van Pelt

=== Recurring cast ===
- Gregory Itzin as Virgil Minelli (7 episodes)
- JoNell Kennedy as Marcia Wallace (2 episodes)
- James Start as Rohn (2 episodes)

=== Guest stars ===
- Željko Ivanek as Dr. Linus Wagner ("Pilot")
- Jack Plotnick as Brett Partridge ("Pilot")
- Kelvin Han Yee as Davis ("Pilot")
- Michael Holden as Michael Cashman ("Pilot")
- Steven Culp as Morgan Tolliver ("Pilot")
- Gail O'Grady as Juniper Tolliver ("Pilot")
- Jeffrey Nordling as Price Randolph ("Pilot")
- Tim Guinee as Tag Randolph ("Pilot")
- Mary A. Stiefvater as Alison Randolph ("Pilot")
- Mandy McMillian as Jenny ("Pilot")
- Lana Asanin as Kelly ("Pilot")
- Molly McColgan as Angela Ruskin Jane ("Pilot")
- Halimah Iman as Audience Member ("Pilot")
- Tara Karsian as Medical Examiner ("Pilot")
- D. David Morin as LAPD Captain ("Pilot")
- Mark Llewelyn as Homicide Detective ("Pilot")
- Eric Stonestreet as Malcolm Boatwright ("Red Hair and Silver Tape")
- Judith Hoag as Sandra Boatwright ("Red Hair and Silver Tape")
- Xander Berkeley as Sheriff Thomas McAllister ("Red Hair and Silver Tape")
- Dylan Minnette as Frankie O'Keefe ("Red Hair and Silver Tape")
- Elpidia Carrillo as Mercedes O'Keefe ("Red Hair and Silver Tape")
- Jillian Bowen as Melanie O'Keefe ("Red Hair and Silver Tape")
- John Bishop as Joe O'Keefe ("Red Hair and Silver Tape")
- Douglas Spain as Hector Ramirez ("Red Hair and Silver Tape")
- Todd Felix as Randall ("Red Hair and Silver Tape")
- Sharmila Devar as Meera ("Red Hair and Silver Tape")
- Jamie McShane as Jack Tanner ("Red Tide")
- Brett Cullen as Dane Kurtik ("Red Tide")
- Owen Beckman as Andy ("Red Tide")
- Michelle Page as Hope ("Red Tide")
- Will Rothhaar as Win ("Red Tide")
- Brando Eaton as Danny Kurtik ("Red Tide")
- JF Pryor as Flipper ("Red Tide")
- Hayley Chase as Darlene Pappas ("Red Tide")
- John Lacy as Kyle Rayburn ("Red Tide")
- Kaylin Stewart as Christine Tanner ("Red Tide")
- Jamie McShane as Lisa Tanner ("Red Tide")
- Cole Protzman as Micah Tanner ("Red Tide")
- Denise Dowse as Detective Carla Mulvey ("Ladies in Red")
- Lisa Brenner as Jennifer Sands ("Ladies in Red")
- David Newsom as Michael Bennett ("Ladies in Red")
- Angela Sarafyan as Adrianna Jonovic ("Ladies in Red")
- Reynaldo Rosales as Dieter Webb ("Ladies in Red")
- Jade Pettyjohn as Julie Sands ("Ladies in Red")
- Con Schell as Jason Sands ("Ladies in Red")
- Bryce Johnson as Ranger Kyle ("Redwood")
- Isabella Acres as Charlotte Anne Jane ("Redwood")
- W. Earl Brown as Rulon Farnes ("Redwood")
- Shelby Fenner as Nicole Gilbert ("Redwood")
- Lily Knight as Leslie Palmer ("Redwood")
- Chad Todhunter as Jason O'Toole ("Redwood")
- Tom Virtue as George Palmer ("Redwood")
- Michael O'Neill as Sheriff Nelson ("Redwood")
- Michelle Lawrence as Kara Palmer ("Redwood")
- Lance Barber as Daniel Cardeira ("Red Handed")
- Andrea Parker as Ann Meier ("Red Handed")
- Maite Schwartz as Jessica Meier-Cardeira ("Red Handed")
- Gwendoline Yeo as Alexandra Yee ("Red Handed")
- William Allen Young as Matt Etienne ("Red Handed")
- Gregg Henry as Cal Trask ("Red Handed")
- Anna Maganini as Nurse ("Red Handed")
- Stuart McLean as Freddy ("Red Handed")
- Kimberly Patterson as Nancy ("Red Handed")
- Robb Skyler as Jolly Alexandra ("Red Handed")
- Joey Anaya as Jim Meier (Uncredited) ("Red Handed")
- Lance Barber as Daniel Cardeira ("Red Handed")
- Andrea Parker as Ann Meier ("Red Handed")
- Maite Schwartz as Jessica Meier-Cardeira ("Red Handed")
- Leslie Hope as Kristina Frye ("Seeing Red")
- Noel Fisher as Travis Tennant ("Seeing Red")
- Ashley Johnson as Clara Tennant ("Seeing Red")
- JR Bourne as Jeremy Hale ("Seeing Red")
- Brad Rowe as Marco Francis ("Seeing Red")
- Lisa Hampton as Connie Adams ("Seeing Red")
- Nancy Stafford as Rosemary Tennant ("Seeing Red")
- Austin Tichenor as High Class Lawyer ("Seeing Red")
- Julian Acosta as Steve Presiado ("The Thin Red Line")
- Mark Rolston as Dale Blakely ("The Thin Red Line")
- Steve Braun as Sam Blakely ("The Thin Red Line")
- Kate McNeil as Katherine Blakely ("The Thin Red Line")
- Tamara Clatterbuck as Lacy Wells ("The Thin Red Line")
- Bradford Tatum as Rick Carass ("The Thin Red Line")
- Bevin Hamilton as Patrice Madigan ("The Thin Red Line")
- Matt Thompson as Joseph Purcell ("The Thin Red Line")
- Dustin Cyril Robles as Manager ("The Thin Red Line")
- Alistair David Herz as Cop ("The Thin Red Line")
- Fred Koehler as Tommy Olds ("Flame Red")
- Danny Nucci as Ben Machado ("Flame Red")
- Chris William Martin as Trey Piller ("Flame Red")
- Joel Bissonnette as Mitchell Reese ("Flame Red")
- Cheryl White as Susan Garcia ("Flame Red")
- Marcella Lentz-Pope as Maddy Garcia ("Flame Red")
- Elisabeth Rohm as Sophie Miller ("Red Brick and Ivy")
- John Aylward as Lewis Stutzer ("Red Brick and Ivy")
- Mark Espinoza as Ed MacVicar ("Red Brick and Ivy")
- Lawrence Pressman as Chancellor Stern ("Red Brick and Ivy")
- Jonathan Spencer as Howie ("Red Brick and Ivy")
- Sarah Lafleur as Emily Nelson ("Red Brick and Ivy")
- Mark Hengst as Alex Nelson ("Red Brick and Ivy")
- Deborah Ann Woll as Kerry Sheehan ("Red Brick and Ivy")
- Anise Fuller as Student ("Red Brick and Ivy")
- Alvin Lam as Student ("Red Brick and Ivy")
- Jack Harding as Medical Examiner ("Red Brick and Ivy")
- James Di Giacomo as Rookie Cop ("Red Brick and Ivy")
- Robert Corvin as University Professor ("Red Brick and Ivy")
- Charlotte Cornwell as Mrs. Renfrew ("Red John's Friends")
- Gabriel Olds as Gardner Renfrew ("Red John's Friends")
- Todd Stashwick as Jared Renfrew ("Red John's Friends")
- Kathleen Gati as Vanna Clooney ("Red John's Friends")
- Danielle Langlois as Breck Renfrew ("Red John's Friends")
- Olivia Hardt as Undine Kopecki ("Red John's Friends")
- Vachik Mangassarian as Store Owner ("Red John's Friends")
- Corey Mendell Parker as Cop ("Red John's Friends")
- David Loren as Junior Lawyer ("Red John's Friends")
- Matt Sigloch as SWAT Team Member ("Red John's Friends")
- Spencer Garrett as Michael Elkins ("Red Rum")
- Laura Leigh Hughes as Janice Elkins ("Red Rum")
- Colby Paul as Brad Elkins ("Red Rum")
- Azura Skye as Tamzin Dove ("Red Rum")
- Michael McGrady as Coach Dieter ("Red Rum")
- Jessie T. Usher as Daniel Brown ("Red Rum")
- L.J. Benet as Kid #1 ("Red Rum")
- Artur Ryabets as Kid #2 ("Red Rum")
- Wings Hauser as A.P. Caid ("Paint It Red")
- Darby Stanchfield as Stevie Caid ("Paint It Red")
- Elizabeth Dennehy as Kathryn Hawkes ("Paint It Red")
- Sebastian Roché as Shirali Arlov ("Paint It Red")
- Brady Smith as Rob Wallace ("Paint It Red")
- Marco Sanchez as Frank Schiappa ("Paint It Red")
- Tamara Knausz as Keely Duane ("Paint It Red")
- Cameron Protzman as Annie Taylor ("Paint It Red")
- Andi Matheny as Annie's Mom ("Paint It Red")
- Ryan Opray as Annie's Dad ("Paint It Red")
- Rodrick Hersh as Russian Mobster ("Paint It Red")
- Elon Gold as Paul Fricke ("Crimson Casanova")
- Sasha Roiz as Keith Wolcott ("Crimson Casanova")
- David Burke as Kevin Haightly ("Crimson Casanova")
- Melinda Page Hamilton as Katie ("Crimson Casanova")
- Alona Tal as Natalie Edreau ("Crimson Casanova")
- Maya Goodwin as Kara ("Crimson Casanova")
- Jacqueline Hickel as Darby ("Crimson Casanova")
- Lori Lively as Molly ("Crimson Casanova")
- Gina Marie May as Sara-Beth ("Crimson Casanova")
- Simone Bargetze as Claire Wolcott ("Crimson Casanova")
- Alex Quijano as Attendant #1 ("Crimson Casanova")
- Anthony Tyler Quinn as Lawyer ("Crimson Casanova")
- Camden Singer as Doctor ("Crimson Casanova")
- Lucia Sullivan as Attendant #2 ("Crimson Casanova")
- Kelly Frazier as Waitress ("Crimson Casanova")
- Paul Michael Glaser as Walter Crew ("Scarlett Fever")
- Yancey Arias as Victor Marquesa ("Scarlett Fever")
- Brandon Waters as Oscar Marquesa ("Scarlett Fever")
- Lisa Arturo as Jackie Shaper ("Scarlett Fever")
- Andrea Bogart as Patience Broadbent ("Scarlett Fever")
- Jolie Jenkins as Mandy Riljek ("Scarlett Fever")
- Marguerite MacIntyre as Heather Prentiss ("Scarlett Fever")
- Meera Simhan as Asra Hadami ("Scarlett Fever")
- Michael Stoyanov as Wardell 'Digger' Suggs ("Scarlett Fever")
- Jessica Pariseau as Dolores ("Scarlett Fever")
- Eamon Hunt as Lawyer ("Scarlett Fever")
- Mark Weiler as Gangster ("Scarlett Fever")
- Richard Schimmelpfenneg as Bomb Squad Van Driver ("Scarlett Fever")
- Monyque Thompson Scott as Seminar Attendee ("Scarlett Fever")
- Gene Farber as Dan Hollenbeck ("Bloodshot")
- H. Richard Greene as Robert Lynch ("Bloodshot")
- Tamlyn Tomita as Lauri Medina ("Bloodshot")
- Rick Worthy as Terry Andrews ("Bloodshot")
- Robyn Cohen as Jill Lamont ("Bloodshot")
- Rebecca Metz as Carol Gentry ("Bloodshot")
- Marisol Ramirez as Dr. Fuller ("Bloodshot")
- Lon Gowan as Tommy ("Bloodshot")
- Mark Daviau as Club Kid ("Bloodshot")
- Richard Schimmelpfenneg as Bomb Squad Team Member ("Bloodshot")
- Patrick Fabian as Randall Faulk ("Carnelian, Inc.")
- Susan Chuang as Joyce Tran ("Carnelian, Inc.")
- Scott Klace as Mike Spruell ("Carnelian, Inc.")
- Scott Lawrence as De Shaun Braemer ("Carnelian, Inc.")
- Jaime Murray as Nadia Sobell ("Carnelian, Inc.")
- Muse Watson as Jake Cooby ("Carnelian, Inc.")
- Rodney Eastman as Lee Skelling ("Carnelian, Inc.")
- Myndy Crist as Jessie Skelling ("Carnelian, Inc.")
- Peter Mackenzie as Holman Perry ("Carnelian, Inc.")
- Brennan Bailey as Tanner Skelling ("Carnelian, Inc.")
- Adam Lieberman as Bomb Squad Officer ("Carnelian, Inc.")
- Dot-Marie Jones as Airport Manager ("Carnelian, Inc.")
- Alastair Mackenzie as Dr. Royston Daniel ("Russet Potatoes")
- Bodhi Elfman as Rick Tiegler ("Russet Potatoes")
- Chris Tallman as Carl Resnik ("Russet Potatoes")
- Wynn Everett as Lindsay Hendrix ("Russet Potatoes")
- Cheyenne Wilbur as Mike ("Russet Potatoes")
- Elzabeth-Viola Reed as Mary Beth Hendrix ("Russet Potatoes")
- Rebecca Rigg as Felicia Scott ("A Dozen Red Roses")
- Sarah Foret as Sydney Hanson ("A Dozen Red Roses")
- Marcus Giamatti as Gabriel Fanning ("A Dozen Red Roses")
- Cameron Dye as Freddie Rossini ("A Dozen Red Roses")
- Michael Trevino as Brandon Fulton ("A Dozen Red Roses")
- Matt Winston as Mitch Cavanaugh ("A Dozen Red Roses")
- Jake Dogias as Marcus Klein ("A Dozen Red Roses")
- Nicholle Tom as Marilyn Monroe/Yolanda Quinn ("A Dozen Red Roses")
- Blake Berris as Rowan/Geoff ("A Dozen Red Roses")
- Sean McClay as CSI Man ("A Dozen Red Roses")
- Ravil Isyanov as Charlie Chaplin ("A Dozen Red Roses")
- Cheyenne Jackson as Police Officer ("A Dozen Red Roses")
- Elizabeth Hirsch-Tauber as Sydney's friend ("A Dozen Red Roses")
- Frankie Ingrassia as Jenny Diedrikson/Gina Russo ("Red Sauce")
- Fredric Lehne as US Marshal Exley ("Red Sauce")
- Tembi Locke as US Marshal Christy Knox ("Red Sauce")
- Dan Lauria as Sonny Bataglia ("Red Sauce")
- Andy Mackenzie as Tiny ("Red Sauce")
- Chris J. Nelson as Putt-Putt ("Red Sauce")
- Tony Lazzara as Ed Diedrikson ("Red Sauce")
- Jack Kehler as Playland Owner ("Red Sauce")
- Jack Betts as Mobster ("Red Sauce")
- Brendon Eggertsen as Midget Thug ("Red Sauce")
- Preston James Hillier as Police Officer ("Red Sauce")
- Leonard Kelly-Young as Forensic Tech ("Red Sauce")
- Tony Longo as Biker ("Red Sauce")
- Nahid Azami as Gambler ("Red Sauce")
- Frederick Keeve as Country Club Member ("Red Sauce")
- Steve Bernard as Coroner's Technician ("Red Sauce")
- Phil Idrissi as Bodyguard ("Red Sauce")
- Lisa Sheridan as Dr. Brooke Harper ("Miss Red")
- Blake Gibbons as Keith Gulbrand ("Miss Red")
- Paul Cassell as Stuart Hanson ("Miss Red")
- Charles Esten as Rick Bregman ("Miss Red")
- Amy Laughlin as Kathryn Stubbs-Gulbrand ("Miss Red")
- J. Marvin Campbell as FBI Agent Hayes ("Miss Red")
- Clay Cullen as Jim Gulbrand ("Miss Red")
- J. Paul Boehmer as Jeff ("Miss Red")
- Charles Shaughnessy as Floor Manager ("Miss Red")
- Amir Khastoo as Saudi Prince ("Miss Red")
- Aaron Skinner as Uniformed Cop ("Miss Red")
- Madison Bauer as Backgammon Club Receptionist ("Miss Red")
- Jessica Pariseau as Clinic Receptionist ("Miss Red")
- Katie Boskovich as Waitress ("Miss Red")
- Elle Kutberg as Kya Rodrick-Anakavana ("Miss Red")
- ElKasa DiLain as Bellamy EllVicho ("Miss Red")
- DeLane Matthews as Carolyn Buft-Banx ("Miss Red")
- Ashley Crow as Chief Elaine Brody ("Blood Brothers")
- Clayton Rohner as Asher MacLean ("Blood Brothers")
- Cameron Monaghan as Elliot ("Blood Brothers")
- Drew Osborne as Bryan ("Blood Brothers")
- Jonathan Biggs as Orrin ("Blood Brothers")
- Aimee Carrero as Cassie ("Blood Brothers")
- Tony Pierce as Marshall Winston ("Blood Brothers")
- Keith Sellon-Wright as David Prentiss ("Blood Brothers")
- Alla Korot as Jemma Prentiss ("Blood Brothers")
- Elizabeth Bond as Instructor Missy Jenkins ("Blood Brothers")
- Casey Margolis as Marley ("Blood Brothers")
- Theron Harrison as Teen Camper ("Blood Brothers")
- Michael Mosley as Ted Hardy/Dumar Tanner ("Red John's Footsteps")
- Michael William Freeman as Mace Guthrie ("Red John's Footsteps")
- Geoff Pierson as Noah Plaskett ("Red John's Footsteps")
- Kate Vernon as Arden Plaskett ("Red John's Footsteps")
- Jonathan Kells Phillips as Drake Plaskett ("Red John's Footsteps")
- Coco Walker as Maya Plaskett ("Red John's Footsteps")
- Diana Cosma as Emma Plaskett ("Red John's Footsteps")
- Ron Althoff as Deputy Duke ("Red John's Footsteps")
- Sally Ann Brooks as Frankel Fogarty ("Red John's Footsteps")
- Christopher Darga as Store Keeper ("Red John's Footsteps")
- Freda Foh Shen as Korean Store Owner ("Red John's Footsteps")
- James Start as Ron ("Red John's Footsteps")
- Alicia Witt as Rosalind Harker ("Red John's Footsteps")

== Episodes ==
No. overall	No. in season	Title	Directed by	Written by	Original release date	Prod. code	U.S. viewers (millions)
1	1	"Pilot"	David Nutter	Bruno Heller	September 23, 2008	276040	15.60
Patrick Jane, an independent consultant to the California Bureau of Investigation (CBI) and a former television psychic, works alongside Senior Agent Teresa Lisbon and agents Kimball Cho, Wayne Rigsby, and Grace Van Pelt. While investigating the murder of a teenage girl, Jane goads the victim's father into revealing his guilt, prompting the girl's mother to shoot him. Two weeks later, the team is called to a double homicide bearing the smiley-face signature of the serial killer Red John. Jane concludes it is the work of a copycat because the mark is painted on the wrong wall, and identifies the killer as Dr. Linus Wagner, who murdered to conceal financial fraud; Wagner is arrested after Jane manipulates him into incriminating himself. A flashback reveals that years earlier, while posing as a psychic, Jane publicly taunted Red John on television, and the killer retaliated by murdering Jane's wife and daughter, a loss that drives his work and his obsession with bringing Red John to justice.
2	2	"Red Hair and Silver Tape"	David Nutter	Bruno Heller	September 30, 2008	3T7801	15.48
When the dead body of an 18-year-old girl is found in the vineyards of Northern Napa County, the CBI team is called in to find a sexual predator who is using silver duct tape and kidnapping red haired women. After creating a timeline for the victim's disappearance from the restaurant where she worked, the team limits the list of suspects to the people who were at the restaurant that night. Hard evidence points to the victim's drug dealer boyfriend, who came by to pick her up, but Jane's mentalist skills point to the chef. To prove his suspicions, Jane goes behind Lisbon's back and orchestrates an undercover operation with Van Pelt as the bait to lure the killer out of hiding. Rigsby nearly attacks Sheriff McAllister when he persists in talking to Van Pelt. But when the operation does not go according to plan, Jane has to get himself out of a jam when he gets caught in a room with not one but two killers: the chef and his wife who have captured another red-haired woman, duct-taping and gagging her.
3	3	"Red Tide"	David M. Barrett	Ashley Gable	October 14, 2008	3T7803	14.94
Patrick Jane and team plunge into the quintessential California world of surfing when a high school girl's body washes up on a state beach. Ditch water in her lungs suggests she was drowned elsewhere and her body was dumped in the ocean as a cover-up. Since the victim was last seen with her four surfer friends at a beach bonfire, soon to be the site of a condo development, Jane surmises the teens know more than they're willing to admit. And when the condo construction site security guard is found murdered and hidden in a block of cement, with evidence proving he died the same night as the victim, Jane sets a mentalist trap to get the four friends to turn on each other after they try framing someone, and reveal the shocking truth of their collective guilt.
4	4	"Ladies in Red"	Chris Long	Gary Glasberg	October 21, 2008	3T7802	15.28
The CBI team investigates the murder of a wealthy investment banker, found tortured before being bolted inside his hidden "safe room." At the memorial service, Jane flirts with the widow and gets her to reveal the victim was a man of many secrets. Through further investigation, the team learns he was living a dual life between his suburban wife and young mistress, and was also skimming millions from clients and hoarding it away to flee the country. While the team suspects the killer is after the nest egg, their suspicions are confirmed when the victim's daughter is kidnapped in exchange for the victim's hidden fortune. After the daughter is rescued, Jane suspects either the wife or mistress as the accomplice so he sets up a mental conundrum, testing their interest in finding the money or child. In the end, the mistress runs to the child and the wife runs to the money.
5	5	"Redwood"	John Behring	Andi Bushell	October 28, 2008	3T7804	16.07
When a bloodstained car connected to two missing girls (Nicole Gilbert and her best friend Kara Palmer) is found abandoned off a local interstate along an isolated lumber town, CBI is called in to help. Upon arrival, Jane locates Kara stabbed to death under the car, but Nicole is nowhere to be found. After searching for her, Nicole turns up at a gas station, covered in blood and holding the murder weapon but has no recollection of what happened. Could she have killed her best friend? Jane, seemingly convinced Nicole is innocent and her memory is just blocked, engineers a situation in which Nicole must relive the terrifying evening. As her memories return and as she helps Jane identify the killer, Lisbon finds herself unintentionally facing him as well, alone.
6	6	"Red Handed"	Chris Long	Erika Green Swafford	November 11, 2008	3T7807	16.57
CBI is called into investigate the murder of James Meier, the manager of operations for a resort casino, whose right hand has been found straddling the borderline between California and Nevada. Was this a mob hit or someone trying to send a message? While Lisbon and team look into Meier's business dealings, Jane uses his mentalist skills at the card tables, which make him a genius player, to rake in chips while studying the players on the floor. In the end, Jane discovers Meier's son-in-law's secret life as a degenerate gambler and plays on his gambling obsession to ultimately lure out the truth.
7	7	"Seeing Red"	Martha Mitchell	Gary Glasberg	November 18, 2008	3T7808	15.84
The team investigates a hit and run murder of a wealthy California heiress, Rosemary Tennant, whose death was predicted by her psychic, Kristina Frye (Leslie Hope), moments before the accident. Jane, always the skeptic, laughs at the prediction and becomes intent on proving the psychic is a fake and a killer. But when CBI discovers Rosemary's will was being changed, suspicion falls on Rosemary's deviant teenage son, who was being cut out of the will, her younger lover, as well as the ever-present Kristina who was named as a beneficiary in the will. In order to catch the real murderer, Jane uses a gathering of Rosemary's supposed loved ones at a seance, that they think is to expose Kristina as a fraud, but is instead a trap to flush out the killer.
8	8	"The Thin Red Line"	Matt Earl Beesley	Ken Woodruff	November 25, 2008	3T7806	15.93
When a State's witness in a narcotics case and his girlfriend (Patrice Matigan) are shot in a motel room, CBI is called in on this high-stakes case. Local police suspect the drug dealer on trial is behind the murders since there is no case without the witness, but Jane surmises Patrice was the intended target. Focusing on Patrice, the team discovers she might have been having an affair with a veteran police officer, suggesting she was killed by a cop to cover up the affair. But when the evidence does not add up, the team stages a fake stake-out to ultimately catch the real killer and uncover the tragic truth behind the murders.
9	9	"Flame Red"	Charles Beeson	Ashley Gable	December 2, 2008	3T7810	18.74
Jane and the team head to a small farming town to investigate the murder of a National Guard veteran, Rich Garcia, who was killed in an arson fire. After learning Rich's fellow veteran buddy, Dave Martin, was killed in a house fire a few years back, the team goes to question the town's police chief, also a veteran from Rich's unit, only to find his house ablaze. With three out of four members from the unit killed by fire, the CBI digs deeper and learns Dave discovered something more valuable than gold to the drought-stricken farming community – a limitless water supply on land purchased for him by his fellow soldiers. When Dave would not cut them in on the potential profits, his "buddies" set his house on fire. Evidence points to the only surviving soldier, Ben Machado, but when someone tries to set him on fire, the team realizes the killer they're after is not motivated by greed but is instead out to avenge Dave's murder.
10	10	"Red Brick and Ivy"	Paris Barclay	Eoghan Mahony	December 16, 2008	3T7805	19.31
When a leading scientific researcher at Leyland University, Alex Nelson, drops dead from poisoning, Jane takes a personal interest in the case after learning the lead suspect and victim's ex-wife, Sophie Miller, is Jane's former psychiatrist. Sophie helped Jane through a bad patch following the murder of his wife and daughter and now Jane wants to return the favor. While the evidence starts to stack up against Sophie, Jane focuses on the multi-million dollar behavioral research project Sophie and Alex were working on, and ultimately discovers their research was a sham. With reputations and millions at stake, Jane and the team must find who was willing to kill to keep the fraud covered up.
11	11	"Red John's Friends"	John Polson	Bruno Heller	January 6, 2009	3T7809	19.62
Jared Renfrew (Todd Stashwick), an inmate serving twenty-five to life for murdering his family housekeeper's daughter, contacts Jane about having information on Red John that he will reveal if Jane will prove his innocence. Minelli disapproves of reopening the case, but Jane needs to find out the truth so he quits CBI, and the rest of the team takes a week's suspension to help him. After delving into the Renfrew family affairs, Jane makes a disturbing discovery that Jared's mother committed the murder and framed Jared, after learning he was in love with the housekeeper's daughter and that the girl was her husband's child from an affair. Following the mother's confession, Jared is released, but slips from sight before revealing anything about Red John. When CBI hunts him down in Mexico, they find Red John has gotten to him first, leaving behind only some cryptic words to the information he had.
12	12	"Red Rum"	Dean White	Andi Bushell	January 13, 2009	3T7811	18.07
When the dead body of a promising high school football star, Cody Elkins, is found with a pentacle and burning candles next to him, CBI suspects a self-proclaimed real witch is the killer. The witch, Tamzin Dove, confesses to putting a death spell on Cody after he killed her cat but swears she did not hurt him. While Cody's parents believe Tamzin is guilty, hospital records stating Cody put his younger brother, Brad, in the hospital for "rough-housing" and a pentacle in Brad's hideout suggests he killed his brother in retaliation. But when Brad does not fall for a mentalist trap and instead his father does, the true story of family abuse and Cody's murder is revealed.
13	13	"Paint it Red"	David M. Barrett	Eoghan Mahony	January 18, 2009	3T7812	16.39
Jane and the CBI team delve into the art world when a fifty million dollar painting is stolen off the office wall of an oil tycoon, A.P. Caid, and his son-in-law is found dead nearby. While it appears the son-in-law, Harry Lashley, was in on the robbery, Jane thinks otherwise and A.P.'s daughter, Stevie, pleads with him to prove her husband is innocent. As the team works to find the real killer and the stolen painting they encounter a variety of suspects including: an art forger who was hired by A.P. to paint a copy of the stolen painting, an art curator with a side-line in helping rich people purchase art, and a criminal Russian oil baron who A.P. outbid to get the painting originally.
14	14	"Crimson Casanova"	Lesli Linka Glatter	Ken Woodruff	February 10, 2009	3T7813	19.70
CBI is called in to investigate the murder of a millionaire's wife, Claire Wolcott, who was shot following a sexual rendezvous with her lover, a local pick-up artist, Paul Fricke. Paul has spent years honing the art of picking up women, creating his own pseudo-mentalist techniques, and using them to seduce women into giving him thousands of dollars. While evidence suggests Claire's controlling husband knew of the affair, giving him motive, the list of suspects grows after CBI interrogates a plethora of local women Paul has scorned. In the end, Cho goes undercover, and with Jane's help, he masterfully employs some of Paul's pick-up techniques to catch the killer—not one of Paul's exes, but someone who has been watching him play women night after night.
15	15	"Scarlett Fever"	Paul Holahan	Erika Green Swafford	February 17, 2009	3T7814	18.23
A country club is rocked when its queen bee, Scarlett Marquesa, is poisoned (with rat poison) at a cocktail party in her home. After interviewing party attendees and the women who served on the club's women's committee board with Scarlett (who was the chairwoman), the CBI discovers that the community itself is full of secrets, such as love affairs and drug abuse. It turns out Scarlett held in-home jewelry parties as a front for the sale of diet pills, tranquilizers, painkillers, etc. Because of the economic downturn, Scarlett was determined to keep up appearances and save her family by any means necessary, which is what ultimately led to her murder.
16	16	"Bloodshot"	Chris Long	Gary Glasberg	March 17, 2009	3T7815	15.49
CBI is shaken up when a bomb threat sent to Jane turns out to be more than just a drill, and instead a gruesome murder of a stockbroker, James Medina. In the resulting explosion, Jane loses his sight, and realises that he is the next target. In finding out why, and who might be behind it, Jane and the team must look through his former clients; and confront some of the consequences of his actions.
17	17	"Carnelian Inc."	Kevin Dowling	Bruno Heller	March 24, 2009	3T7816	17.62
An anonymous campaign against a big corporation begins with the threat of a murder at a specific time and place. Greed and betrayal pits Jane against a passel of alpha male financiers. CBI investigates a series of murders at a corporate retreat in the wilds of the Sierra Nevada foothills.
18	18	"Russet Potatoes"	Norberto Barba	Ashley Gable	March 31, 2009	3T7817	16.96
A man brings a corpse to the police, convinced he's carrying a sack of potatoes. Jane and the CBI team encounter various trance and counter-trance situations as they try to track down a mastermind who hypnotizes people in order to kill them.
19	19	"A Dozen Red Roses"	Lesli Linka Glatter	Andi Bushell	April 7, 2009	3T7818	16.92
Jane and the team go to Hollywood when they investigate the murder of a movie producer. Guest stars Rebecca Rigg, Simon Baker's real-life wife.
20	20	"Red Sauce"	Adam Kane	Eoghan Mahony	April 28, 2009	3T7819	17.11
Ed Didrikson, aka Eddie Russo, a member of the mafia turned informant, is found dead by the river with a gunshot wound to the head. Through their investigation even though Eddie was in witness protection, he was dealing pot to teenagers and having an affair with one of the U.S. Marshals. Meanwhile Jane pursues his own investigation on the golf course with Santino Battaglia, a mafia boss, learning about Eddie's past while helping him with his golf game.
21	21	"Miss Red"	Martha Mitchell	Ken Woodruff	May 5, 2009	3T7820	16.68
CBI is called to an exclusive harbor, Pelican Cove, to investigate the disappearance of Jim Gulbrand, CEO and founder of the software company Gaia Matrix. Jane and Lisbon discover him dead and bound to the anchor of his yacht. The investigation leads them to Jim's girlfriend, Brooke Harper (Lisa Sheridan), a psychiatrist, however they discover that Brooke is a con artist, who was playing Jim for his hidden fortune. Jane uses Brooke as bait to lead them to the hidden money and in the process discovers another con artist at play.
22	22	"Blood Brothers"	John Polson	Erika Green Swafford	May 12, 2009	3T7822	16.21
The team is called to Bright Arch, a wilderness program for troubled youth, to investigate the death of one of the students, Justin Prentiss. Jane is able to talk to the students in a less formal setting and finds out that Justin was part of the Z crew, a secret group that gets its name from the story of a mad ax man named Zachariah. Jane stages the resurrection of Zachariah at the school's Sacred Fire, to unearth the real culprit.
23	23	"Red John's Footsteps"	Chris Long	Bruno Heller	May 19, 2009	3T7821	16.82
When the body of Emma Plaskett is found on state land, the CBI is called in to investigate. As Jane notices the victim's toenails are painted with her own blood, the team looks up to see skywriting form Red John's signature smiley face. Emma's twin sister Maya is also missing, and the investigation begins at the Plaskett home. Jane does not think the girls were random targets, but something more personal, while Lisbon thinks this case is a trap that Red John has set for Jane. Rigsby and Cho track the skywriting transaction to a dummy corporation's P.O. Box and find a letter that leads them to the sender, a blind woman named Rosalind Harker. Rosalind had a relationship with Red John, but can only give a description of Red John based on her other senses. She does help shed some light on Red John's friend Dumar. Checking out a lead on a farm property linked to Red John, Jane is held at gunpoint by Sheriff Hardy, a.k.a. Dumar. Lisbon rescues Jane but Red John escapes. In the aftermath, Sheriff Hardy frees himself from handcuffs and tries to shoot Lisbon, but is killed by Jane.

== International reception ==
In the UK, the first season aired on FIVE, on Thursdays at 9pm. The series premiered on March 26, 2009 and concluded on August 20, 2009, with a double-bill. Over the 23 episodes, the season averaged 2.84 million viewers, with the pilot being the most watched episode (4.21 million viewers), and "Red Brick and Ivy" being the least watched episode with 2.08 million viewers.

== DVD release ==
All 23 episodes of the season were included on the six disc complete first season set. It was released on September 22, 2009 in Region 1, March 8, 2010 in Region 2, and September 23, 2009 in Region 4. Special features included the featurettes "Evidence of a Hit Series" and "Cracking the Crystal Ball: Mentalist Vs. Psychic". "Cracking the Crystal Ball: Mentalist Vs. Psychic", was produced by Martin Fisher at DG Entertainment for CBS Television. This short film explored the use of psychics in law enforcement by interviewing former FBI, parapsychologist Dr. Barry E. Taff, and psychic detective Jack Rourke. Other cast members include Mark Llewellyn, Karl Sonnenberg, Jon Armstrong.
