= Libby Szabo =

American politician

Member of the Colorado House of Representatives from the 27th district
- In office January 12, 2011 – January 29, 2015
- Preceded by: Sara Gagliardi
- Succeeded by: Lang Sias

Personal details
- Party: Republican
- Website: libbyszabo.com

Libby Szabo is an American politician and a former Republican member of the Colorado House of Representatives. She represented District 27 from January 12, 2011, until her resignation on January 29, 2015.

On January 30, 2015, Szabo was appointed as Jefferson County commissioner to replace former commissioner Faye Griffin. After Democrats won all contested county elections in 2018, Szabo became the sole Republican in the county commission and one of only three county Republican officials left. She lost re-election in 2020 to former state Rep. Tracy Kraft-Tharp.

Szabo is a member of the conservative lobbying group American Legislative Exchange Council (ALEC). She is the organization's co-state chairperson with Bill Cadman.

== Elections ==
- 2012 Szabo ran unopposed for the June 26, 2012 Republican Primary, winning with 4,969 votes, and won the November 6, 2012 General election with 23,365 votes (52.6%) against Democratic nominee Tim Allport and her 2010 Libertarian opponent, Bud Martin.
- 2008 When Democratic Senator Sue Windels retired and left the Senate District 19 seat open, Szabo ran unopposed for the August 12, 2008 Republican Primary, winning with 5,857 votes, but lost the November 4, 2008 General election to Democratic Representative Evie Hudak.
- 2010 To challenge House District 27 incumbent Democratic Representative Sara Gagliardi, Szabo ran unopposed for the August 10, 2010 Republican Primary, winning with 5,884 votes, and won the three-way November 2, 2010 General election with 14,852 votes (49.2%) against Democratic Representative Gagliardi and Libertarian candidate Bud Martin, who had run for a Senate seat in 2000.
