= Al Meiklejohn =

American politician

Member of the Colorado Senate from the 19th district
- In office January 9, 1985 – January 8, 1997
- Preceded by: Don MacManus
- Succeeded by: Jim Congrove

Member of the Colorado Senate from the 16th district
- In office January 12, 1977 – January 9, 1985
- Preceded by: Robert E. Johnson
- Succeeded by: John P. Donley

Personal details
- Born: June 18, 1923 Omaha, Nebraska
- Died: March 1, 2010 (aged 86) Arvada, Colorado
- Party: Republican

Al Meiklejohn (June 18, 1923 – March 1, 2010) was an American politician who served in the Colorado Senate from 1977 to 1997.

He died on March 1, 2010, in Arvada, Colorado at age 86.
