= National Association for Gun Rights =

American gun group

National Association for Gun Rights, Inc.
- Logo of National Association for Gun Rights
- Formation: March 29, 2000; 26 years ago
- Tax ID no.: 54-2015951
- Legal status: 501(c)(4) nonprofit organization
- Headquarters: Loveland, Colorado
- Board Chairman: David Warrington
- President: Dudley Brown
- Vice President: Ryan Flugaur
- Vice President: Steve Humphery
- Revenue: $12,451,900 (2014)
- Expenses: $12,473,252 (2014)
- Employees: 64 (2014)
- Website: nationalgunrights.org

The National Association for Gun Rights (NAGR) is a gun rights advocacy group in the United States. They maintain an affiliated PAC and a nonprofit legal foundation. Officially incorporated in Virginia on March 29, 2000, NAGR was founded by Dudley Brown as a national companion organization to Rocky Mountain Gun Owners. NAGR is a rival to the more moderate National Rifle Association of America (NRA) and considers itself to be a more "conservative alternative" to the NRA. The group spends most of its energy focused on lawmakers and moderates who are deemed too compromising on Second Amendment issues. This is achieved via direct mail, robocalls and low-cost television ads. The group has gained notoriety for its lobbying tactics and attack ads.

== Activities ==
National Association for Gun Rights is opposed to the United Nations Arms Trade Treaty. The organization is also opposed to legislative actions on high-capacity magazines. National Association for Gun Rights opposes efforts led by Citizens for Self-Governance to call a convention to propose amendments to the United States Constitution to rein in the powers of the federal government.

When a vacancy arose in the Colorado State Legislature in 2012, NAGR supported Tim Neville over State Representative Jim Kerr, who they felt was not sufficiently supportive of Second Amendment rights.

In 2012, National Association for Gun Rights sued the state of Montana over state laws that may require the organization to register as a political committee prior to mailing postcards critical of Montana Attorney General Steve Bullock's record on gun rights. According to the IRS, "a section 501(c)(4)... may engage in some political activities, so long as that is not its primary activity." National Association for Gun Rights' request for a preliminary injunction was denied in October. Bullock was elected Governor the following month.

In March 2015, National Association for Gun Rights was involved in opposing gun control measures in Vermont. The NAGR campaigned to stop the Vermont state legislature from passing SB 141.

National Association for Gun Rights supports the passage of no-permit Constitutional carry. In April 2015, NAGR supported Kansas bill SB 45, which allows for Constitutional carry. NAGR representatives were present at the bill signing on April 2.

In June 2015, National Association for Gun Rights sent out mailers targeting Republican William J. Howell, the Speaker of the Virginia House of Delegates. According to The Washington Post, NAGR's mailer "Portrayed Howell as being friendly to rapists" by depicting a woman cowering before a knife-wielding assailant alongside the text "Speaker Bill Howell thinks you should be left vulnerable to armed thugs and rapists!" Howell had been endorsed by the NRA and said he was a "100 percent supporter of the Second Amendment". Howell described the mailers as "pretty low by even today's political standards".

In 2015, the Colorado State Legislature considered amending a 2013 law that limited magazines to 15 rounds. The legislature wanted to increase the limit to 30 rounds. Brown rejected the proposed increase on the grounds that there should be no limit at all. NAGR was criticized for their position, with Jon Caldara of the libertarian Independence Institute calling NAGR head Dudley Brown a "bully".

== Disagreement with the National Rifle Association ==
In November 2011, the U.S. House passed legislation that would require states that issue concealed gun permits to recognize similar licenses from other states. The bill was supported by the National Rifle Association of America (NRA) which considered it to be a top priority, but opposed by the NAGR on the basis that it could become a "Trojan horse for more gun control".

"As early as March 23 (2013), POLITICO had reported on rumors that the NRA and (Sen. Joe) Manchin were engaged in secret talks over background checks. Two days later, the National Association of Gun Rights sent out a bulletin to its members: “I’ve warned you from the beginning that our gravest danger was an inside-Washington driven deal,” wrote NAGR executive Dudley Brown. He added that the deal was a “Manchin-NRA compromise bill.” The Gun Owners of America followed suit a week later, urging its members to contact the NRA to voice their opinion. Neither of these groups had even a tenth of the NRA’s membership, or its political power, but they threatened to chip away at the group’s reputation. Whatever NRA HQ’s position on the bill may have been, it was fast getting outflanked by ideologues on the right."

In 2013, NAGR spent close to $1.9 million on gun lobbying during the first three months of the year, while the NRA reported spending $700,000 on the same issue.

The NRA has referred to NAGR leader Dudley Brown as "the Al Sharpton of the gun movement".

NAGR has pointed out the NRA's financial and verbal support of gun control champions such as Nevada Senator Harry Reid as an indication of just how misguided their efforts are.

The Huffington Post described NAGR as "The much leaner, more pugnacious version of the NRA. Where the NRA has looked to find some common ground with gun reform advocates and at least appear to be reasonable, NAGR has been the unapologetic champion of opening up gun laws even more."

In a 2019 Politico article, NAGR president Dudley Brown described the differences between his organization and the NRA "As an organization, we don’t use Gucci-loafered lobbyists in Washington, D.C. in $200,000 wardrobes to grease the palms of weak-kneed politicians to vote right,” said Dudley Brown, president of the National Association for Gun Rights, referencing the NRA chief executive’s purported lavish spending. “Instead, we activate our members to do that lobbying for us and for them. That’s the power in a grassroots lobby and NRA lost that a long time ago.”

Dudley Brown is listed as the second most influential pro-gun advocate in America in Gunpowder Magazine's "Top 20 Most Influential Pro-Gun Advocates" article published in May 2023.

== National Foundation for Gun Rights ==
The National Foundation for Gun Rights stated goals are twofold: "To enforce and expand pro-gun precedents issued by the courts by challenging unconstitutional laws, and seeking to enforce pro-gun statutes." And "To defend gun owners in the courts to ensure that law-abiding citizens who have had their rights violated by bureaucrats, or overzealous law enforcement, are protected."

Through its foundation, National Association for Gun Rights filed a lawsuit against the U.S. Postal Service, Bonidy v. USPS for prohibiting the carrying of firearms on Postal Service property. The 10th circuit ruled in favor of the gun ban, and the Supreme Court refused to consider the case, by denying a writ of certiorari.

During the McDonald v. Chicago Supreme Court case, an amicus brief filed by NAGR was cited by the court prior to the victory for gun owners.

The National Association for Gun Rights' legal arm, the National Foundation for Gun Rights, donated over $50,000 to benefit Kyle Rittenhouse.

After the acquittal of Kyle Rittenhouse, the National Foundation for Gun Rights released this statement, "When we saw the video evidence of Kyle defending himself and others in Kenosha, WI, NFGR made the decision to support him right away, and we're thrilled to see that he is now a free man," NFGR Executive Director Dudley Brown.

The foundation sent $10,000 to the legal team of Theresa Imani Bragg. Bragg, a single mother raising four children, is charged with first-degree murder in the death of her ex-boyfriend, John Laverette. Foundation Executive Director Dudley Brown said about the incident, “This is exactly who the Second Amendment is for – a single mom in a crime-ridden city with an abusive ex breathing down her neck. The Second Amendment exists so that when that gangbanger ex bursts through her door and threatens her life, she has options — she doesn’t have to die.”

NFGR sent San Jose California Mayor Sam Liccardo and city council members a cease-and-desist letter dated July 14, 2021. The letter calls out city leaders for their discussions about creating a citywide ordinance mandating gun liability insurance and an annual fee on gun owners. "The foundation maintains the city would violate the Second Amendment by imposing a tax on “a select group of law-abiding citizens” exercising their right to keep and bear arms."

"Executive Director Dudley Brown called the ordinance a “full-frontal assault” on gun owners “by the gun control zealots running the city of San Jose.” The foundation sees the ordinance as unfair to law-abiding citizens, Brown said." In January 2022, the San Jose California city council voted to adopt a first-in-the-nation ordinance that required most gun owners to pay a fee and carry liability insurance. "We've opposed this ordinance every step of the way and we will see this through to the end," Dudley Brown, president of the National Association for Gun Rights and executive director of the National Foundation for Gun Rights, told CNN in a statement before the vote. Also in response to the proposed San Jose legislation, policy director Hannah Hill defined the organization's stance on the origin of the right to bear arms. Hill asserted that the right is "God-given" and the ordnance would be unconstitutional.

The National Foundation for Gun Rights filed an amicus brief in the U.S. Supreme Court in July 2021 challenging New York’s permit laws, which prohibit concealed carry without a permit – but deny permits unless the applicant can demonstrate a “special” need to carry a gun (which does not include a general desire for self-defense, according to state courts). As a result, ordinary citizens are functionally prohibited from exercising their Second Amendment right to bear arms. NFGR’s brief argues that the Second Amendment is not a second-class right and that the right to public carry is protected by the Second Amendment as understood by the Founders.

== Political action committee ==
The National Association for Gun Rights PAC (NAGR-PAC) is an affiliated political action committee registered with the Federal Election Commission. Founded in 2010, it endorsed and donated to several candidates for federal office, including Paul Broun (R-GA), Cory Gardner (R-CO), Sharron Angle, Ken Buck, and Rand Paul (R-KY). In the 2012 election cycle, NAGR-PAC endorsed Richard Mourdock, who defeated Dick Lugar for the Republican U.S. Senate nomination in Indiana, with an initial contribution of $4,500 to his campaign; Steve Daines, who ran a successful campaign for Montana's at-large seat in the U.S. House of Representatives; and Steve Stockman who ran a successful campaign for Texas's 36th congressional district. NAGR-PAC spent $83,312 in election-related expenses during the 2012 election cycle.

NAGR hired its first federal lobbyist in response to the Sandy Hook Elementary School shooting that occurred in December 2012.

In the 2014 election cycle, NAGR's endorsements included Chris McDaniel (R-MS), Scott Renfroe (R-CO), Joe Miller (R-AK) and Mike Turner (R-OH).

NAGR sent out mailers in the 2016 Texas state legislative primary season that "walked a fine line under new and still untested state ethics law", according to the Houston Chronicle.

In October 2021 NAGR PAC endorsed Ohio Candidate Josh Mandel in the 2022 U.S. Senate Race.

== Reception ==
In August 2013, National Association for Gun Rights and Dudley Brown were profiled in a 5280 magazine story. According to the article, Brown "savagely and routinely attacks candidates and officeholders unwilling to pledge, in writing, their absolute loyalty to Brown on Second Amendment issues". NAGR was described as a "fund-raising machine that bullies anyone who compromises Brown's pro-gun, anti-abortion, anti-gay agenda." Former Colorado Republican State Representative B.J. Nikkel said Brown "is a political terrorist and a modern-day charlatan who operates in the shadows and portrays himself as a supposed 'Christian,' but he uses the people naive enough to believe him and financially support him".

Mother Jones magazine included NAGR on a list of "7 Gun Groups That Make the NRA Look Reasonable".

In 2013, FactCheck.org, in a piece called "Gun Rights Group's Aim Is Way Off", found that NAGR "is going after three congressmen with 'A' ratings from the National Rifle Association by falsely claiming they support President Obama's gun control agenda".

National Association for Gun Rights has been criticized for its fundraising practices. Former Republican Colorado Governor Bill Owens said Brown "makes his money when there's turmoil, real or perceived, because that's what gets his members to write him checks". Ammoland wrote that Brown's "rhetoric has done more to marginalize Second Amendment activism than all of the slanders from gun prohibition lobbying groups combined".

== See also ==
- Firearms Policy Coalition
