= Lindsey Daugherty =

American attorney and politician

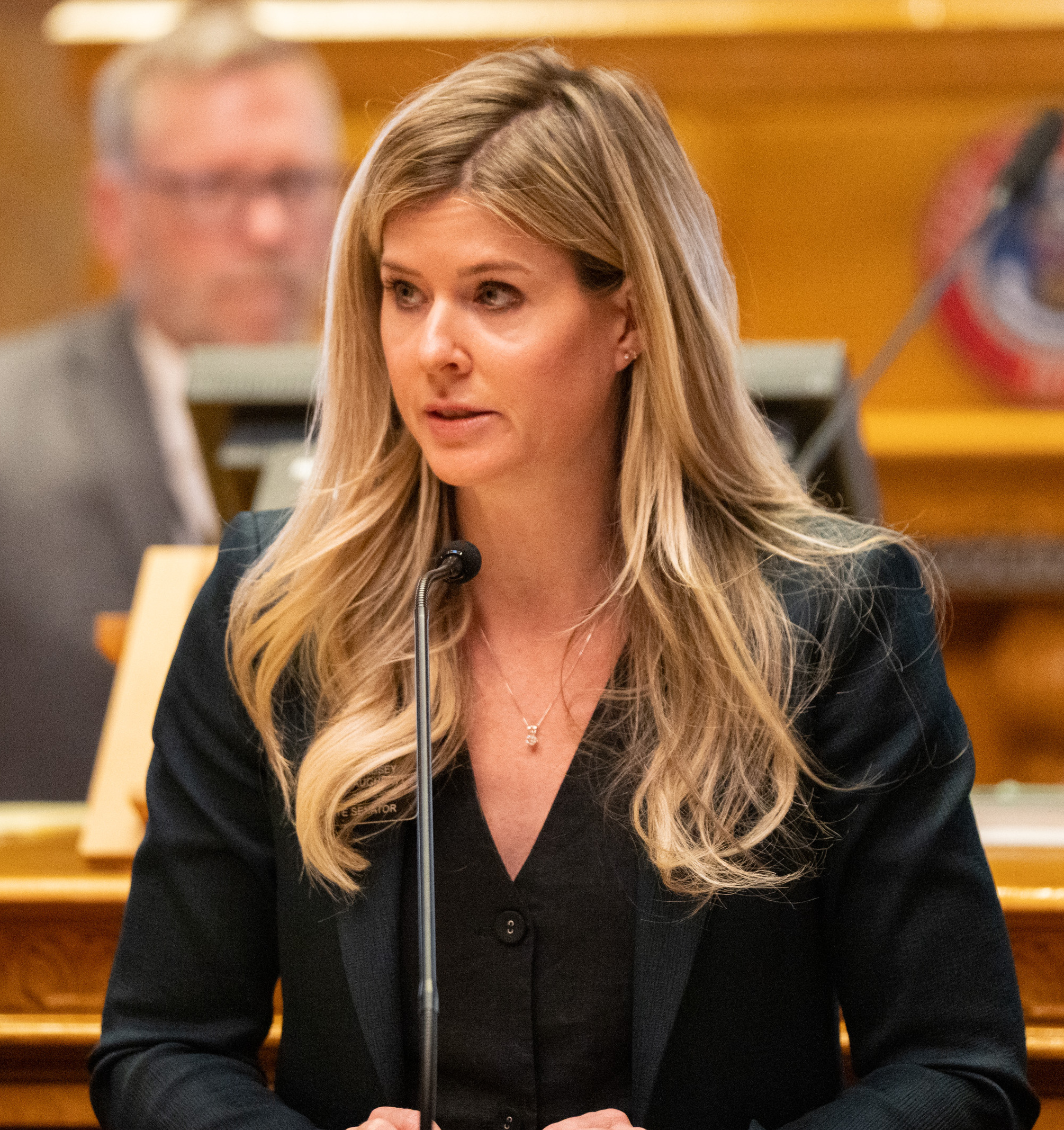

Member of the Colorado Senate for the 19th District
- Incumbent
- Assumed office January 8, 2025
- Preceded by: Rachel Zenzinger

Member of the Colorado House of Representatives from the 24th district
- In office January 9, 2023 – January 8, 2025
- Preceded by: Redistricted
- Succeeded by: Lisa Feret

Member of the Colorado House of Representatives from the 29th district
- In office January 13, 2021 – January 9, 2023
- Preceded by: Tracy Kraft-Tharp
- Succeeded by: Redistricted

Personal details
- Party: Democratic
- Education: University of Northern Iowa (BA); University of Denver (JD)

Lindsey N. Daugherty is an American attorney and politician serving as a member of the Colorado Senate, representing the 19th senate district, which includes Denver's northwestern suburbs in Jefferson County, covering most of Arvada and parts of Westminster.

Daugherty previously served in the Colorado House of Representatives from the 24th district. Prior to reapportionment implemented in 2023, Daugherty represented the 29th district. First elected in 2020, she first assumed office on January 13, 2021.

== Background ==
Daugherty graduated from Thompson Valley High School in Loveland, Colorado. She earned a Bachelor of Arts degree in political science from the University of Northern Iowa and a Juris Doctor from the Sturm College of Law at the University of Denver. Daugherty has worked as an attorney and in the office of Representative Tracy Kraft-Tharp.
