= Mark Paschall =

American politician

Member of the Colorado House of Representatives from the 29th district
- In office January 11, 1995 – January 8, 2003
- Preceded by: Michelle Lawrence
- Succeeded by: Bob Briggs

Personal details
- Born: November 14, 1954 (age 71) Flint, Michigan
- Party: Republican

Mark Paschall (born November 14, 1954) is an American politician who served in the Colorado House of Representatives from the 29th district from 1995 to 2003.
