= Jim Congrove =

American politician

Member of the Colorado Senate from the 19th district
- In office January 8, 1997 – January 10, 2001
- Preceded by: Al Meiklejohn
- Succeeded by: Sue Windels

Member of the Colorado House of Representatives from the 27th district
- In office January 11, 1995 – January 8, 1997
- Preceded by: Jim Pierson
- Succeeded by: Barry Arrington

Personal details
- Born: May 5, 1946
- Died: January 10, 2012 (aged 65) Arvada, Colorado
- Party: Republican

Jim Congrove (May 5, 1946 – January 10, 2012) was an American politician who served in the Colorado House of Representatives from the 27th district from 1995 to 1997 and in the Colorado Senate from the 19th district from 1997 to 2001.

He died of heart complications on January 10, 2012, in Arvada, Colorado, at age 65.
