= Tracy Kraft-Tharp =

American politician

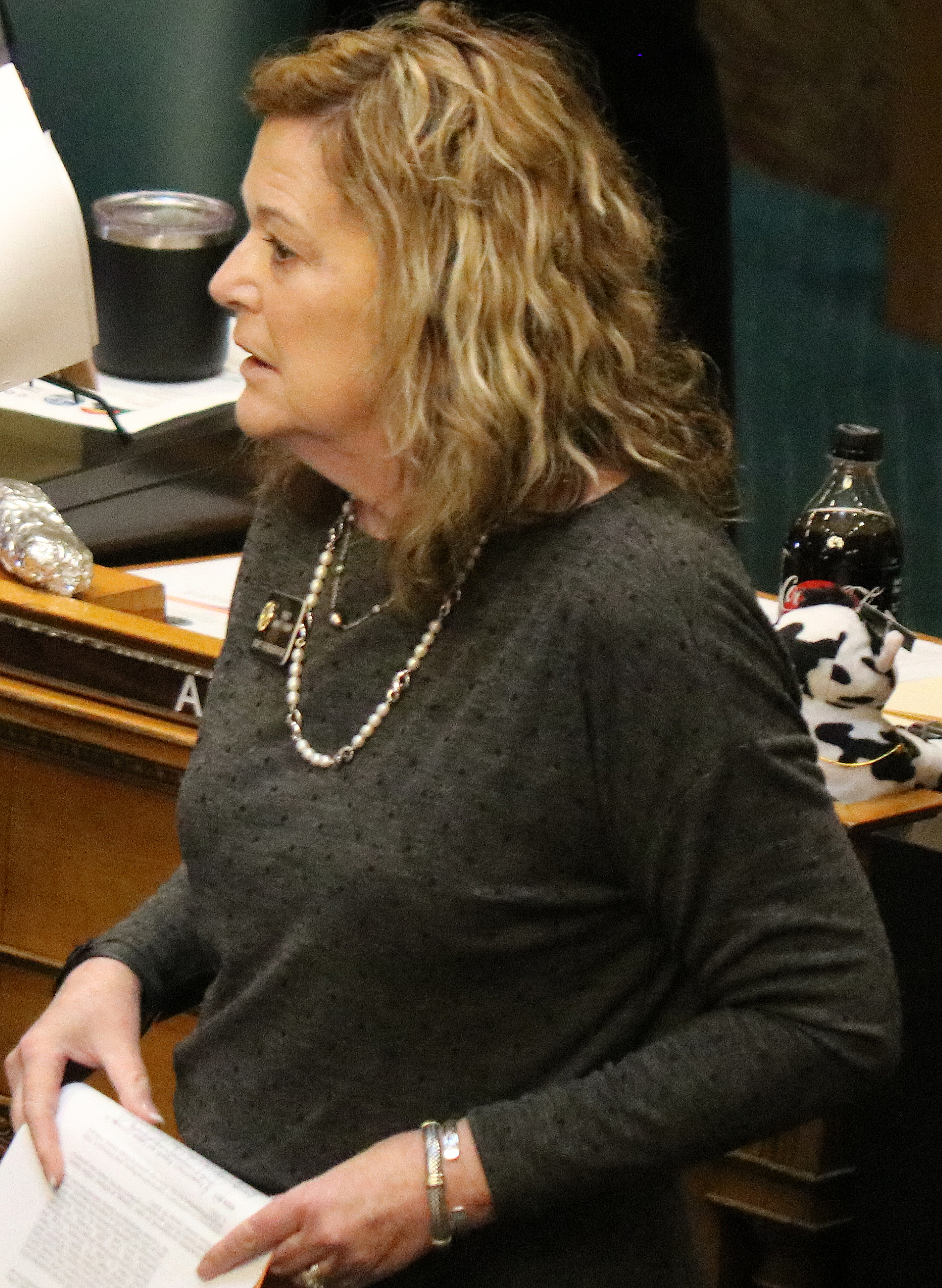

Member of the Jefferson County Commission from the 1st district
- In office 2021–2025
- Preceded by: Libby Szabo
- Succeeded by: Rachel Zenzinger

Member of the Colorado House of Representatives from the 29th district
- In office January 9, 2013 – January 13, 2021
- Preceded by: Robert Ramirez
- Succeeded by: Lindsey Daugherty

Personal details
- Party: Democratic
- Spouse: Vern Tharp
- Education: Minnesota State University Moorhead (BS); University of Denver (MSW, JD)

Tracy Kraft-Tharp is an American teacher and politician who served on the county commission in Jefferson County, Colorado from 2021 to 2025. Prior to her tenure on the county commission she served in the Colorado House of Representatives from the 29th district from 2013 to 2021, as a member of the Democratic Party.

Kraft-Tharp was educated at Minnesota State University Moorhead and the University of Denver before working at Metropolitan State University, and Regis University. She defeated incumbent Republican Representative Robert Ramirez in the 2012 election for a seat in the state house and was reelected in the 2014, 2016, and 2018 elections. During her tenure she chaired the Business Affairs and Labor committee. She defeated incumbent Commissioner Libby Szabo for a seat on the Jefferson County Commission in the 2020 election.

== Early life and education ==
Tracy Kraft-Tharp graduated from Minnesota State University Moorhead with a bachelor's degree in psychology, sociology and education and from the University of Denver with a master of social work in social work and a Juris Doctor. She worked as a teacher at a middle school, Metropolitan State University, and Regis University, youth counselor in a juvenile detention center, and social worker. She married Vern Tharp.

== Career ==
=== Colorado House of Representatives ===
Robert Ramirez, a Republican member of the Colorado House of Representatives from the 29th district, was targeted by the Democratic Party in the 2012 election as he won in the 2010 election by 197 votes. Kraft-Tharp won the Democratic primary and defeated Ramirez and Libertarian nominee Hans V. Romer in the election. She defeated Republican nominee Susan Kochevar and Libertarian nominee Romer in the 2014 election. Ramirez was initially the Republican nominee, but withdrew and a vacancy committee selected Kochevar to replace him. She defeated Republican nominee Kochevar in the 2016 election. Kraft-Tharp defeated Republican nominee Grady Nouis and Libertarian nominee Romer in the 2018 election after she raised $129,699 while Nouis raised $38,762.

One of Kraft-Tharp's aides accused Representative Steve Lebsock of sexual harassment. During her tenure in the state house she served on the Appropriations and Finance committees and chaired the Business Affairs and Labor committee.

Kraft-Tharp declined to seek an appointment to replace Senator Evie Hudak. She considered running to succeed Ed Perlmutter in the United States House of Representatives from Colorado's 7th congressional district during the 2018 election. She endorsed Hillary Clinton during the 2016 Democratic presidential primaries and Joe Biden during the 2020 Democratic presidential primaries.

=== Local politics ===
Kraft-Tharp was a member of the Jefferson County PTA. She announced her campaign for a county commission seat in Jefferson County, Colorado, on November 6, 2019, with Lindsey Rasmussen as her campaign manager. She defeated incumbent Republican commissioner Libby Szabo and Libertarian nominee Romer. During her tenure on the commission she served as the chair pro tem. She announced her intention not to seek re-election for 2024. Kraft-Tharp was succeeded by Rachel Zenzinger. In early 2025, she announced her retirement.

== Political positions ==
Kraft-Tharp voted against renaming Columbus Day to be in honor of Frances Xavier Cabrini. She received an A rating from NARAL Pro-Choice America. Her scores from the American Civil Liberties Union ranged from 89% in 2013, 60% in 2015, and 83% in 2019, while receiving 100% in 2014, 2016, 2017, and 2018.

== Electoral history ==
2012 Colorado House of Representatives 29th district Democratic primary
Party	Candidate	Votes	%	±%
Democratic	Tracy Kraft-Tharp	2,664	100.00%	
Total votes		2,664	100.00%	

2012 Colorado House of Representatives 29th district election
Party	Candidate	Votes	%	±%
Democratic	Tracy Kraft-Tharp	19,368	51.27%	
Republican	Robert Ramirez	16,281	43.10%	
Libertarian	Hans V. Romer	2,129	5.64%	
Total votes		37,778	100.00%	

2014 Colorado House of Representatives 29th district Democratic primary
Party	Candidate	Votes	%	±%
Democratic	Tracy Kraft-Tharp (incumbent)	3,021	100.00%	
Total votes		3,021	100.00%	

2014 Colorado House of Representatives 29th district election
Party	Candidate	Votes	%	±%
Democratic	Tracy Kraft-Tharp (incumbent)	14,908	49.24%	
Republican	Susan Kochevar	13,329	44.02%	
Libertarian	Hans V. Romer	2,040	6.74%	
Total votes		30,277	100.00%	

2016 Colorado House of Representatives 29th district Democratic primary
Party	Candidate	Votes	%	±%
Democratic	Tracy Kraft-Tharp (incumbent)	3,502	100.00%	
Total votes		3,502	100.00%	

2016 Colorado House of Representatives 29th district election
Party	Candidate	Votes	%	±%
Democratic	Tracy Kraft-Tharp (incumbent)	21,701	54.56%	
Republican	Susan Kochevar	18,072	45.44%	
Total votes		39,773	100.00%	

2018 Colorado House of Representatives 29th district Democratic primary
Party	Candidate	Votes	%	±%
Democratic	Tracy Kraft-Tharp (incumbent)	8,345	100.00%	
Total votes		8,345	100.00%	

2018 Colorado House of Representatives 29th district election
Party	Candidate	Votes	%	±%
Democratic	Tracy Kraft-Tharp (incumbent)	22,100	58.30%	
Republican	Grady Nouis	14,169	37.38%	
Libertarian	Hans V. Romer	1,637	4.32%	
Total votes		37,906	100.00%	

2020 Jefferson County Commission 2nd district Democratic primary
Party	Candidate	Votes	%	±%
Democratic	Tracy Kraft-Tharp	104,821	100.00%	
Total votes		104,821	100.00%	

2020 Jefferson County Commission 2nd district election
Party	Candidate	Votes	%	±%
Democratic	Tracy Kraft-Tharp	185,307	51.89%	
Republican	Libby Szabo (incumbent)	155,443	43.53%	
Libertarian	Hans V. Romer	16,350	4.58%	
Total votes		357,100	100.00%	
