= Robert Ramirez =

American politician in Colorado from 2010 to 2012

Member of the Colorado Legislature from the 29 district
- In office 2011–2013
- Preceded by: Debbie Benefield
- Succeeded by: Tracy Kraft-Tharp

Personal details
- Born: Robert Edgar Ramirez
- Party: Republican Party (United States)
- Spouse: Suzanne Ramirez
- Children: 1
- Profession: Manager
- Committees: Education Committee, Colorado House of Representatives Transportation Committee, Colorado House of Representatives

Military service
- Allegiance: U.S. Navy
- Years of service: 1988-1988

Robert Ramirez is a former legislator in the U.S. state of Colorado. Elected to the Colorado House of Representatives as a Republican, he represented House District 29, which centers around the communities of Westminster and Arvada, from 2010 to 2012.

== Biography ==
Ramirez was born in New Jersey to a Mexican father and an American mother. His parents divorced when he was eight years old; he and his two siblings were raised by their mother, who worked as a survey engineer among other jobs. As a young person he was active in Boy Scouts of America, and he went on to earn the Eagle Scout rank.

=== Education and career ===
After graduating from high school Ramirez enlisted in the United States Navy and was honorably discharged in 1988. He worked for several years in management positions in Texas then, moved to Arvada, Colorado. In 2002 he moved to Westminster, Colorado. He has been a part of several entrepreneur ventures. Before beginning his legislative career, he managed a Denver-based uniform supply company.

Ramirez earned an associate degree in business. His wife, Suzanne, is an elementary school teacher and has worked in Jefferson County schools since 2001. Ramirez attributes his political aspirations to his daughter prodding him to serve.

== Legislative career ==
=== 2010 election ===
In the 2010 legislative session, Ramirez served on the Transportation and Education committees.

=== 2012 election ===
In the 2012 general election, Representative Ramirez faced Democratic challenger Tracy Kraft-Tharp. Kraft-Tharp was elected by a margin of 51% to 43%.
