= Mile High Newspapers =

Newspaper company in Colorado

Mile High Newspapers is based in Golden, Colorado, United States. The company publishes four weekly newspapers: the Arvada Press, Lakewood Sentinel, Golden Transcript, and Wheat Ridge Transcript. The company was formerly known as Jeffco Publishing Co. until its most recent name change in May 2005. In more than a year's time, the company was acquired by Jackalope Publishing in 2006 from New West Newspapers.
