= Lakewood Sentinel =

The Lakewood Sentinel is a weekly newspaper that serves the community of Lakewood, Colorado.

The newspaper was owned by Mile High Newspapers until purchased by the company now known as Colorado Community Media based in Englewood, Colorado.

Founded in 1923, the tabloid-style paper currently is printed in all color and comes out on Thursdays.
