= Evie Hudak =

American politician (born 1951)

Member of the Colorado Senate from the 19th district
- In office January 7, 2009 – November 27, 2013
- Preceded by: Sue Windels
- Succeeded by: Rachel Zenzinger

Member of the Colorado State Board of Education from the 2nd district
- In office 2001–2009
- Preceded by: Patti Johnson
- Succeeded by: Angelika Schroeder

Personal details
- Born: 1951 (age 74–75) New York City, U.S.
- Party: Democratic
- Spouse: Edward Hudak
- Children: 1

Evie Hudak (born 1951) is an American politician who served in the Colorado Senate from the 19th district as a member of the Democratic Party from 2009 to 2013. Prior to her tenure in the state senate she served on the Colorado State Board of Education from the 2nd congressional district from 2001 to 2009.

Hudak was born in New York City, and later worked at Westword. She unsuccessfully ran for a seat in the state house in the 1994 election, but lost to Republican nominee Mark Paschall. She was elected and reelected to the state board of education in 2000 and 2006. Hudak was elected to the state senate in the 2008 election and her reelection in the 2012 election was attributed to a spoiler candidate. She resigned in 2013 rather than face a recall election and was replaced by Rachel Zenzinger.

== Early life and education ==
Evie Hudak was born in New York City in 1951. She married Edward Hudak, with whom she had one child. She has a bachelor of Arts degree in English and education. She worked as the listings editor for Westword.

== Career ==
=== Early politics ===
Hudak ran for a seat in the Colorado House of Representatives from the 29th district with the Democratic nomination in the 1994 election, but lost to Republican nominee Mark Paschall and placed ahead of independent candidate Joanne Conte. She was elected to a seat on the Colorado State Board of Education from the 2nd congressional district with the Democratic nomination in the 2000 election against Republican nominee Ron J. Marquez. She was reelected without opposition in the 2006 election. Angelika Schroeder was selected to replace her on the Board of Election after Hudak was elected to the Colorado Senate in the 2008 election. Hudak supported Barack Obama during the 2008 Democratic presidential primaries.

=== Colorado Senate ===
Senator Sue Windels, a member of the state senate from the 19th district, was term-limited during the 2008 election. Hudak won the Democratic nomination without opposition and defeated Republican nominee Libby Szabo in the general election. She defeated Republican nominee Lang Sias and Libertarian nominee Lloyd A. Sweeny in the 2012 election. Sweeny was considered a spoiler candidate as Hudak won with a plurality of the vote.

In 2013, Senate President John Morse and Senator Angela Giron were defeated in recall elections organized by gun rights activists. A recall was being organized against Hudak due to her support of gun control legislation. She resigned on November 27, stating that she was doing it to protect the gun control legislation as if she had lost the recall election it would allow the Republicans to gain control of the state senate. She also stated that she resigned in order for $200,000 to not be spent on a recall election. Representative Tracy Kraft-Tharp initially ran to be appointed to replace Hudak, but dropped out and endorsed former Representative Sara Gagliardi. Rachel Zenzinger was selected by the vacancy committee on December 10 to replace Hudak.

== Later life ==
Hudak served as a delegate to the Democratic National Convention for Hillary Clinton from the 7th congressional district during the 2016 Democratic presidential primaries. She endorsed Andrew Romanoff for the Democratic nomination during the 2020 United States Senate election.

== Political positions ==
Hudak sponsored legislation to prohibit leg shackles and waist restraints on women in prison during childbirth. She and Senator Linda Newell sponsored legislation to end zero tolerance policies in schools and make mandatory expulsion only available when a student brought a gun to school. In 2009, the state senate voted seventeen to eighteen, with Hudak in favor, against repealing capital punishment.

== Electoral history ==
1994 Colorado House of Representatives 29th district election
Primary election
Party	Candidate	Votes	%
Democratic	Evie Hudak	684	100.00%
Total votes		684	100.00%
	Blank	141	
General election
Republican	Mark Paschall	6,600	45.35%
Democratic	Evie Hudak	5,639	38.75%
Independent	Joanne Conte	2,313	15.89%
Total votes		14,552	100.00%
	Blank	838	

2000 Colorado Board of Education 2nd district election
Primary election
Party	Candidate	Votes	%
Democratic	Evie Hudak	14,429	100.00%
Total votes		14,429	100.00%
General election
Democratic	Evie Hudak	144,965	55.14%
Republican	Doug Townsend	117,953	44.86%
Total votes		262,918	100.00%
	Undervote	117,953	

2006 Colorado Board of Education 2nd district election
Primary election
Party	Candidate	Votes	%
Democratic	Evie Hudak (incumbent)	21,249	100.00%
Total votes		21,249	100.00%
General election
Democratic	Evie Hudak (incumbent)	167,024	100.00%
Total votes		167,024	100.00%

2008 Colorado Senate 19th district election
Primary election
Party	Candidate	Votes	%
Democratic	Evie Hudak	6,689	100.00%
Total votes		6,689	100.00%
General election
Democratic	Evie Hudak	31,740	51.00%
Republican	Libby Szabo	30,495	49.00%
Total votes		62,235	100.00%

2012 Colorado Senate 19th district election
Primary election
Party	Candidate	Votes	%
Democratic	Evie Hudak (incumbent)	5,684	100.00%
Total votes		5,684	100.00%
General election
Democratic	Evie Hudak (incumbent)	35,664	47.02%
Republican	Lang Sias	35,080	46.25%
Libertarian	Lloyd A. Sweeny	5,104	6.73%
Total votes		75,848	100.00%
