= Arvada Press =

- Type: Weekly newspaper
- Owner(s): Mile High Newspapers
- Editor: Mikkel Kelly
- Headquarters: Golden, CO, U.S.
- Website: milehighnews.com

The Arvada Press newspaper is delivered weekly, primarily by youth carriers, to 37,200 single-family households in Arvada, Colorado, U.S. On May 5, 2005, the paper replaced the former Arvada Sentinel Newspaper.

The newspaper was owned by Mile High Newspapers, which is based in Golden, Colorado. In May 2021, The Colorado Sun and nonprofit organization the National Trust for Local News became joint owners of The Arvada Press along with over a dozen more local newspapers.
