= Laura J. Woods =

American politician (born 1961)

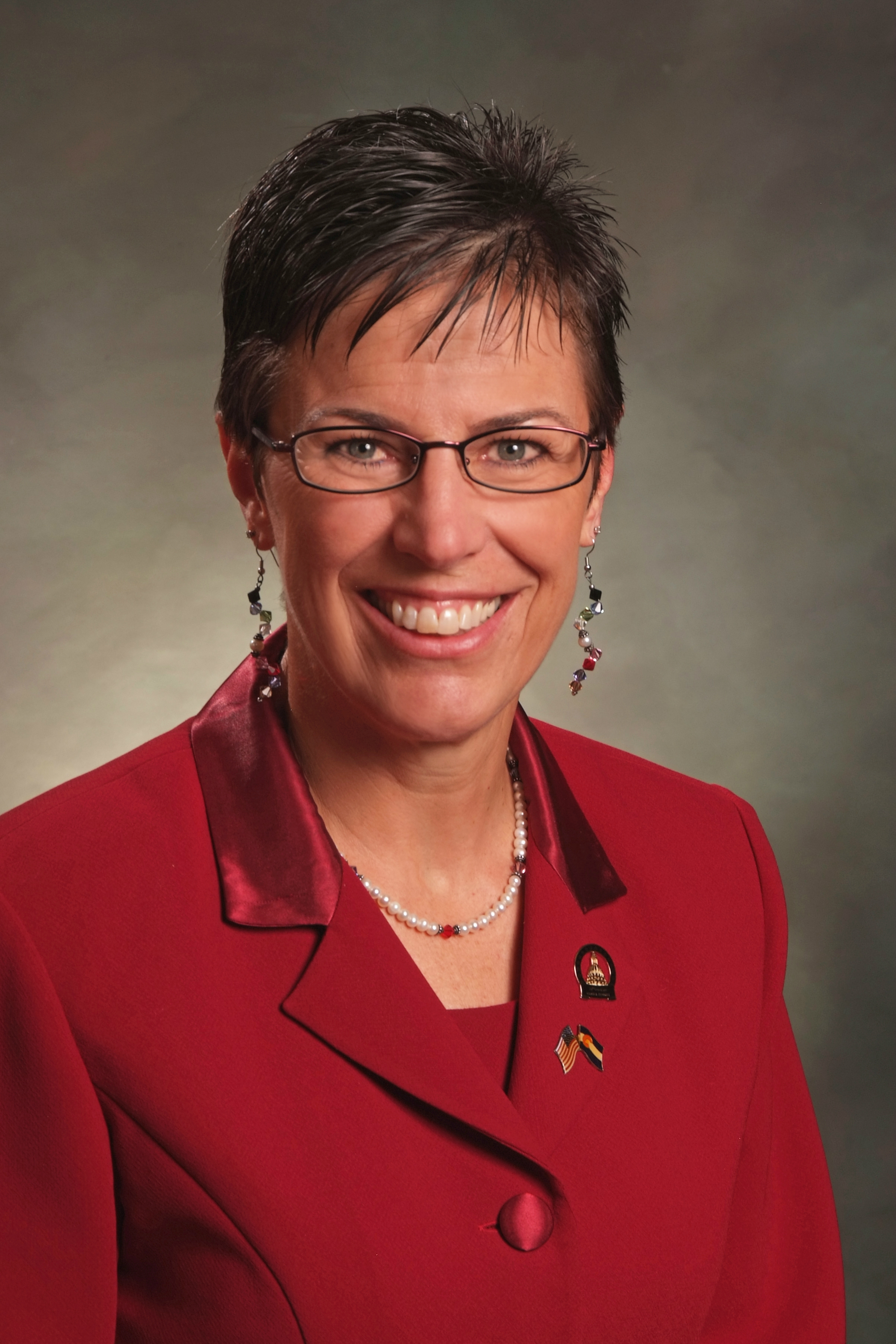

Member of the Colorado State Senate from the 19th district
- In office January 7, 2015 – January 11, 2017
- Preceded by: Rachel Zenzinger
- Succeeded by: Rachel Zenzinger

Personal details
- Born: July 6, 1961 (age 65) Kremmling, Colorado
- Party: Republican
- Spouse: Bill Woods
- Occupation: Businesswoman

Laura J. Woods (born July 6, 1961) was a state senator in the U.S. State of Colorado. She represented Senate District 19, which encompasses most of the City of Arvada, and the northwest section of the City of Westminster in Jefferson County. She served on the Senate Appropriations, Business, Labor & Technology and Education committees.

== Colorado State Senate ==
=== Elections ===
Early in 2014, Woods decided to run for the SD 19 Senate position. She submitted her Affidavit with the Secretary of State on January 6, 2014. A Republican competitor entered the race on January 14, 2014. Woods won the Republican primary in June 2014. She continued her Senate campaign and beat the appointed incumbent Democratic senator in the November 2014 General Election.

In 2016 she stood for re-election for a full 4-year term. She was defeated by Democrat Rachel Zenzinger.

=== Tenure ===
Woods was sworn in on January 7, 2015, and served on three Senate Committees of Reference: Business, Labor & Technology; Education and Appropriations. She was also appointed to the legislative Board of Ethics and the Joint Health Benefit Exchange Implementation Review Committee.
