= Michelle Lawrence =

American politician

Michelle Lawrence is a former state legislator and county commissioner. She served in the Colorado House of Representatives from 1991 to 1994. She is a Republican.

She chaired the Jefferson County Board of Commissioners. She represented Jefferson County.

Scott McInnis gave a congressional speech in tribute to her work in 2004.
