= Sue Windels =

American politician (born 1946)

Member of the Colorado Senate from the 19th district
- In office January 10, 2001 – January 14, 2009
- Preceded by: Jim Congrove
- Succeeded by: Evie Hudak

Member of the Colorado House of Representatives from the 27th district
- In office January 13, 1999 – January 10, 2001
- Preceded by: Barry Arrington
- Succeeded by: Bill Crane

Personal details
- Born: July 11, 1946 (age 80) Nampa, Idaho
- Party: Democratic

Sue Windels (born July 11, 1946) is an American politician who served in the Colorado House of Representatives from the 27th district from 1999 to 2001 and in the Colorado Senate from the 19th district from 2001 to 2009.
