= Rachel Zenzinger =

American politician

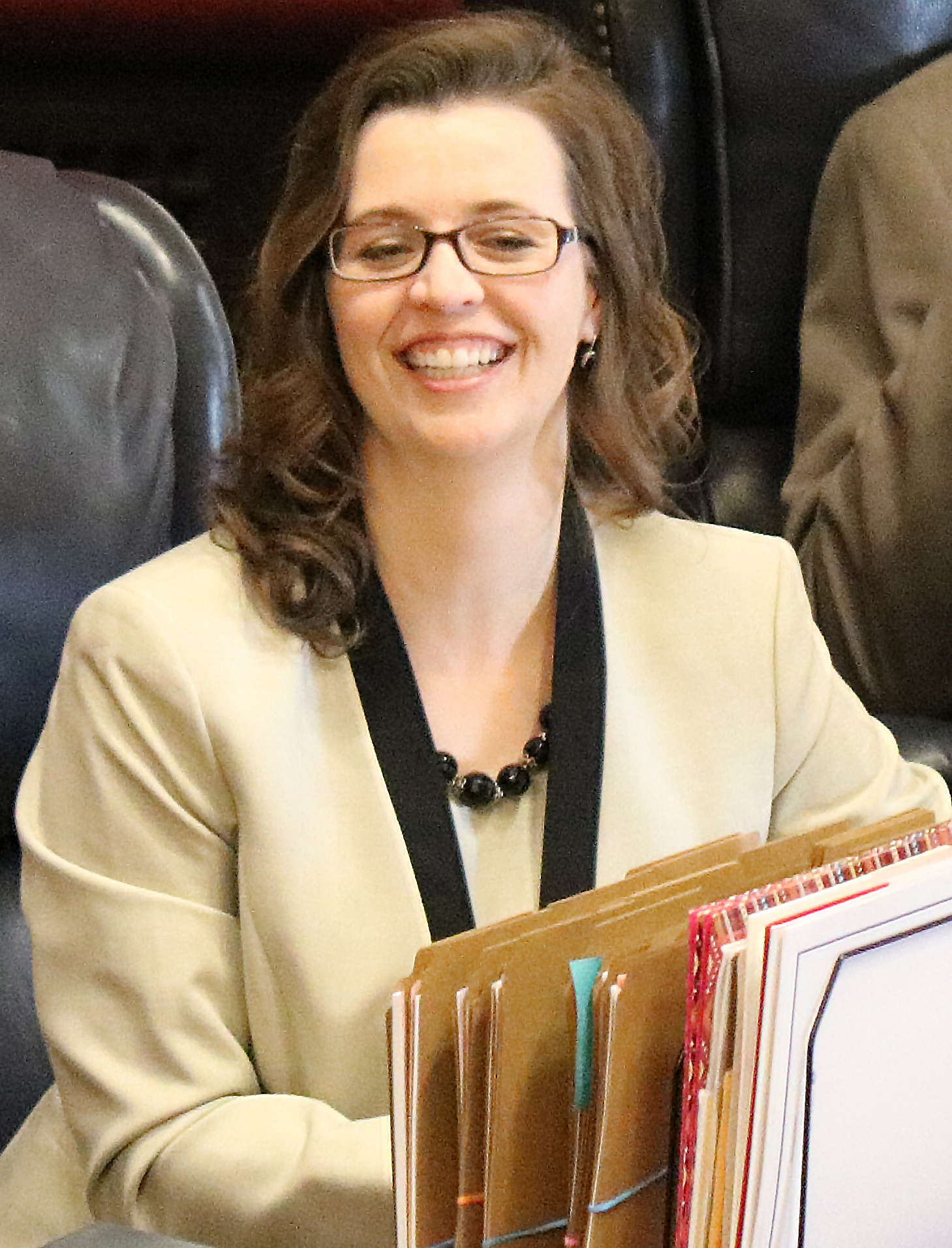

Member of the Colorado Senate from the 19th district
- In office January 11, 2017 – January 8, 2025
- Preceded by: Laura J. Woods
- Succeeded by: Lindsey Daugherty
- In office December 10, 2013 – January 14, 2015
- Preceded by: Evie Hudak
- Succeeded by: Laura J. Woods

Personal details
- Born: 1974 (age 51–52) Colorado
- Party: Democratic
- Education: Regis University (BA, MA)
- Website: Campaign website

Rachel Zenzinger (born 1974) is an American politician from the state of Colorado. A Democrat, Zenzinger is the Jefferson County Commissioner for District 1. She has also represented the 19th district of the Colorado Senate from 2017 to 2025, previously representing the same seat from her appointment in 2013 until 2015. Before that, Zenzinger served on the Arvada City Council.

== Personal life and education ==
Zenzinger earned a bachelor's degree and master's degree from Regis University.

== Career ==
Zenzinger was elected to the Arvada City Council in 2008. She became Mayor Pro Tem in 2011.

Zenzinger was appointed to the state senate following the resignation of Evie Hudak. Zenzinger was the campaign manager of Hudak's 2012 campaign.

In 2023, she played an important role in removing upzoning provisions from a major land use reform bill that Colorado Democrats were writing to address the housing crisis in Colorado. Zensinger wrote an editorial with Republican Colorado legislator Barbara Kirkmeyer that argued that the reform bill "should be amended to eliminate state control of local land-use planning." The bill subsequently was left to languish in the Senate, preventing its passage in the 2023 legislative session.

In the 2024 election, Zenzinger ran for Jefferson County commissioner to represent District 1. She won the race to succeed Tracy Kraft-Tharp and assumed office in January 2025.
