= Colorado's 19th Senate district =

American legislative district

Colorado's 19th State Senate district
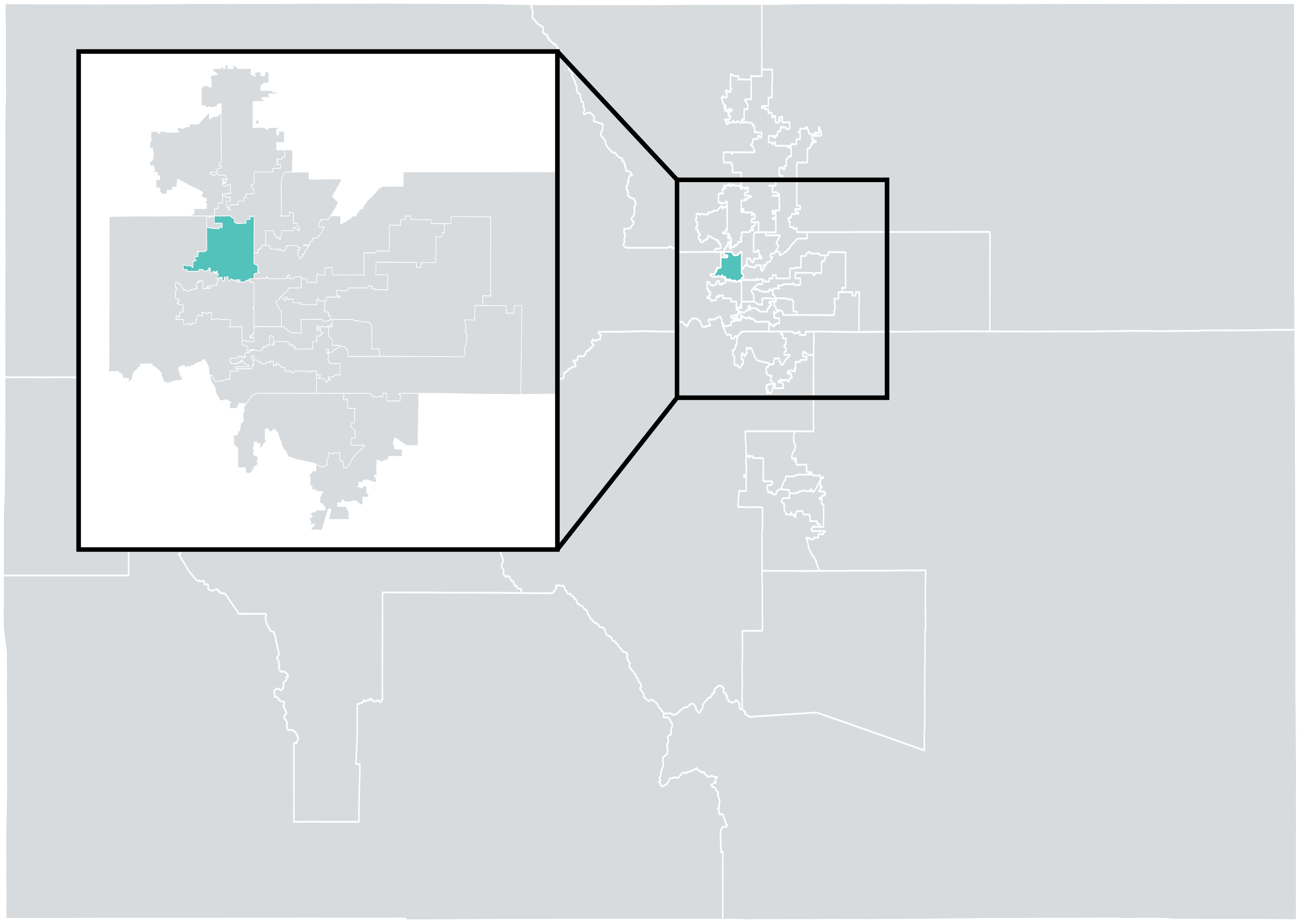
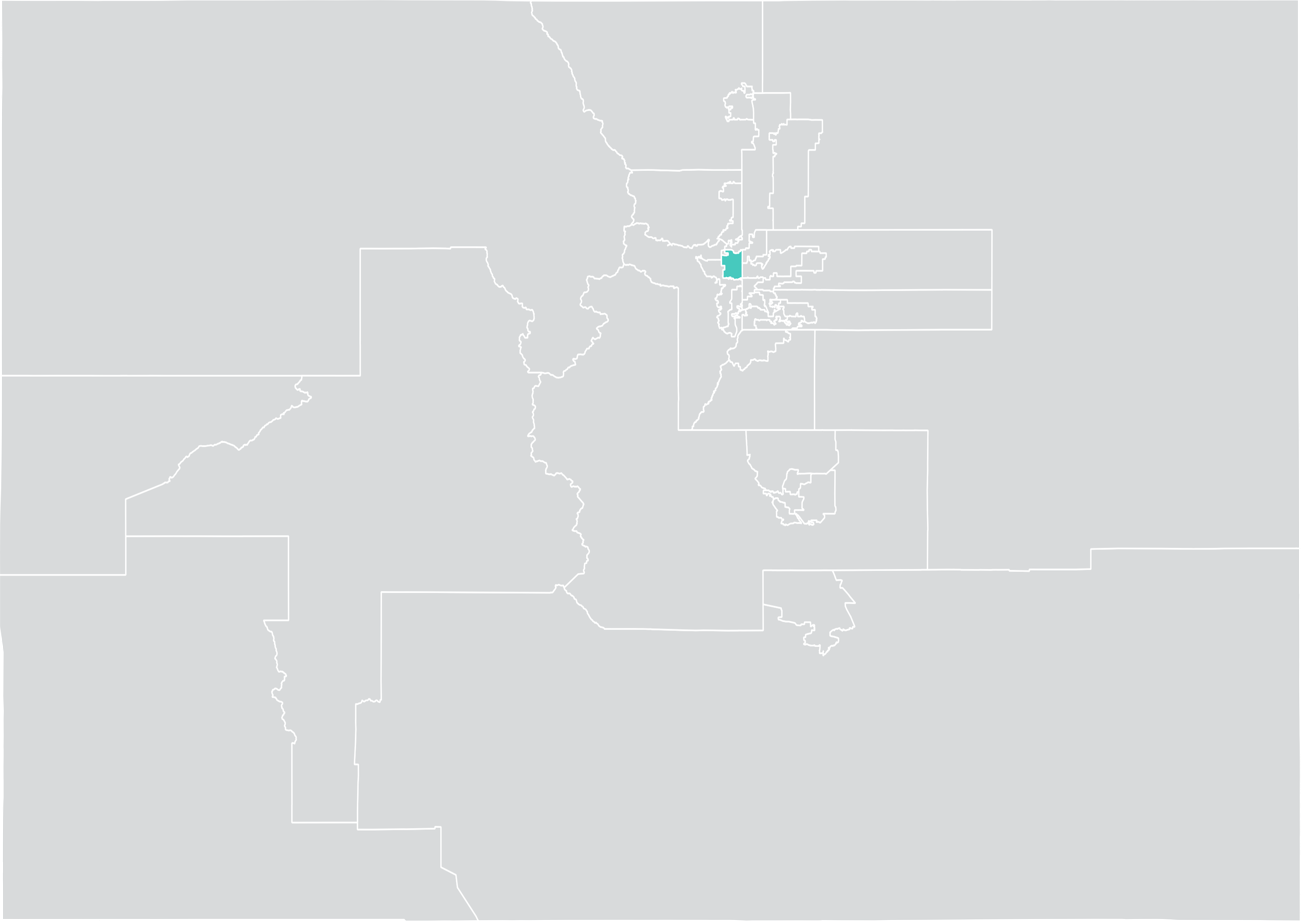
Senator
Lindsey Daugherty; D–Arvada
- Registration: 27.5% Democratic; 21.1% Republican; 49.3% No party preference
- Demographics: 78% White; 1% Black; 15% Hispanic; 3% Asian; 1% Native American; 2% Other
- Population (2018): 148,396
- Registered voters: 113,133

Colorado's 19th Senate district is one of 35 districts in the Colorado Senate. It has been represented by Democrat Lindsey Daugherty since 2025.

== Geography ==
District 19 is based in Denver's northwestern suburbs in Jefferson County, covering most of Arvada and parts of Westminster.

The district is located entirely within Colorado's 7th congressional district, and overlaps with the 24th, 27th, and 29th districts of the Colorado House of Representatives.

== Recent election results ==
Colorado state senators are elected to staggered four-year terms; under normal circumstances, the 19th district holds elections in presidential years.

=== 2024 ===
2024 Colorado Senate election, District 19
Party	Candidate	Votes	%
Democratic	Lindsey Daugherty	54,900	56.13
Republican	Sam Bandimere	40,596	41.51
Libertarian	Ryan VanGundy	2,305	2.36
Total votes		97,801	100
Democratic hold			

=== 2020 ===
2020 Colorado State Senate election, District 19
Party	Candidate	Votes	%
Democratic	Rachel Zenzinger (incumbent)	54,694	59.2
Republican	Lynn Gerber	37,740	40.8
Total votes		92,434	100
Democratic hold			

=== 2016 ===
2016 Colorado State Senate election, District 19
Party	Candidate	Votes	%
Democratic	Rachel Zenzinger	39,070	47.8
Republican	Laura Woods (incumbent)	37,592	46.0
Libertarian	Hans Romer	5,112	6.3
Total votes		81,774	100
Democratic gain from Republican			

=== 2014 ===
In 2013, incumbent Democrat Evie Hudak chose to resign rather than face a recall election, and her former campaign manager Rachel Zenzinger was appointed to her seat. The resignation triggered an off-cycle election in 2014 which Zenzinger lost to Laura Woods.

2014 Colorado State Senate election, District 19
Primary election
Party	Candidate	Votes	%
Republican	Laura Woods	6,813	55.4
Republican	Lang Sias	5,484	44.6
Total votes		12,297	100
General election
Republican	Laura Woods	29,907	47.6
Democratic	Rachel Zenzinger (incumbent)	29,244	46.6
Libertarian	Gregg Miller	3,664	5.8
Total votes		62,815	100
Republican gain from Democratic			

=== 2012 ===
2012 Colorado State Senate election, District 19
Party	Candidate	Votes	%
Democratic	Evie Hudak (incumbent)	35,664	47.0
Republican	Lang Sias	35,080	46.3
Libertarian	Lloyd Sweeney	5,104	6.7
Total votes		75,848	100
Democratic hold			

=== Federal and statewide results ===
Year	Office	Results
2020	President	Biden 57.5 – 39.5%
2018	Governor	Polis 54.2 – 41.2%
2016	President	Clinton 47.6 – 42.8%
2014	Senate	Udall 47.1 – 46.6%
2014	Governor	Hickenlooper 49.8 – 45.2%
2012	President	Obama 52.1 – 45.3%
