= DC Animated Movie Universe =

American media franchise

- DC logo used between 2016 and 2024
- Years: 2013–2024

Miscellaneous
- Distributed by: Warner Bros. Home Entertainment
- Country: United States

The DC Animated Movie Universe (DCAMU) is an American media franchise and shared universe of animated films distributed between 2013 and 2024 by Warner Bros. Animation and DC Entertainment. Based on characters from the DC Universe (DC Comics), the franchise is part of the DC Universe Animated Original Movies line.

The main film series is split into two story arcs with different continuities. The first story arc began in 2013 with Justice League: The Flashpoint Paradox and ended in 2020 with Justice League Dark: Apokolips War, while the second story arc, nicknamed the "Tomorrowverse", began later that year with Superman: Man of Tomorrow and concluded in 2024 with the Justice League: Crisis on Infinite Earths trilogy.

The franchise comprises 25 films overall, with tie-in media including 5 short films, one web series and two digital comics.

== Development history ==
=== First story arc: "New 52" (2013–2020) ===
The franchise was initially loosely based on a set of storylines from the New 52, DC Comics' 2011 reboot of its monthly comics' continuity. Following a teaser in the franchise's first film Justice League: The Flashpoint Paradox, a five-film story arc loosely based on the "Darkseid War" storyline written by Geoff Johns, started from Justice League: War and was later revisited in The Death of Superman, Reign of the Supermen and concluded in Justice League Dark: Apokolips War.

After the first story arc ended, screenwriter Ernie Altbacker teased the possibility of a new project related to that continuity. He said that "the way we ended it ... it's really like a tough balancing act: It ends something on a bittersweet yet hopeful note, and I'll just say, people who are saying, 'Oh man, we're not going to get anymore of these!' ... you're not losing something, you're gaining something new ..."

The DC Showcase short film Constantine: The House of Mystery was released in May 2022 and is a narrative sequel to Justice League Dark: Apokolips War.

=== Second story arc: "Tomorrowverse" (2020–2024) ===
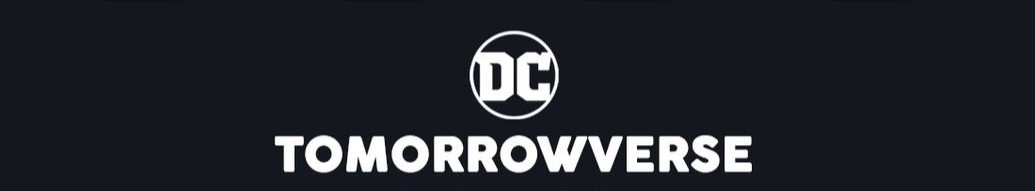
Tomorrowverse logo

Pre-production of the DCAMU's second story arc began in 2018 when Butch Lukic and Jim Krieg decided to plan out a ten-film story arc that would be set after the events of Justice League Dark: Apokolips War, which ends the first story arc with a universal reset. The arc itself originally was not planned to have the "Crisis on Infinite Earths" storyline as a major plot point, but these plans were eventually changed once executives from Warner Bros. Animation asked for it to serve as the finale.

Lukic and Krieg were also unaware of the Arrowverse's plans for their own adaptation at the time and only found out when Eric Carrasco contacted them, since he served as a writer for Justice League vs. the Fatal Five and knew them personally.

The franchise's second story arc has the art style and storyline being carried over to further films that were set in the same continuity. It gained the nickname of "Tomorrowverse" after the release of Superman: Man of Tomorrow.

Constantine: The House of Mystery continues certain story elements and helps set up the Justice League: Crisis on Infinite Earths plot, which was later confirmed to be a three-part storyline and serves as the overall conclusion to the DCAMU, with all the remaining films being released in 2024.

== Films ==
Film	U.S. release date	Director(s)	Writer(s)	Producer(s)
First story arc "New 52" (2013–2020)
Justice League: The Flashpoint Paradox	July 30, 2013	Jay Oliva	Jim Krieg	James Tucker
Justice League: War	February 4, 2014	Jay Oliva	Heath Corson	James Tucker
Son of Batman	April 22, 2014	Ethan Spaulding	Joe R. Lansdale & James Robinson	James Tucker
Justice League: Throne of Atlantis	January 13, 2015	Ethan Spaulding	Heath Corson	James Tucker
Batman vs. Robin	April 7, 2015	Jay Oliva	J. M. DeMatteis	James Tucker
Batman: Bad Blood	January 20, 2016	Jay Oliva	J. M. DeMatteis	James Tucker
Justice League vs. Teen Titans	March 29, 2016	Sam Liu	Bryan Q. Miller & Alan Burnett	James Tucker
Justice League Dark	January 24, 2017	Jay Oliva	Ernie Altbacker & J. M. DeMatteis	James Tucker
Teen Titans: The Judas Contract	April 4, 2017	Sam Liu	Ernie Altbacker	James Tucker
Suicide Squad: Hell to Pay	March 27, 2018	Sam Liu	Alan Burnett	Sam Liu
The Death of Superman	July 24, 2018	Sam Liu & Jake Castorena	Peter J. Tomasi	Sam Liu & Amy McKenna
Constantine: City of Demons	March 24, 2018	Doug Murphy	J. M. DeMatteis	Sam Register, David S. Goyer, Greg Berlanti & Sarah Schechter
Reign of the Supermen	January 29, 2019	Sam Liu	Tim Sheridan & Jim Krieg	James Tucker
Batman: Hush	July 20, 2019	Justin Copeland	Ernie Altbacker	Amy McKenna
Wonder Woman: Bloodlines	October 5, 2019	Sam Liu & Justin Copeland	Mairghread Scott	Sam Liu & Amy McKenna
Justice League Dark: Apokolips War	May 5, 2020	Matt Peters & Christina Sotta	Ernie Altbacker & Mairghread Scott	James Tucker
Second story arc: "Tomorrowverse" (2020–2024)
Superman: Man of Tomorrow	August 23, 2020	Chris Palmer	Tim Sheridan	Jim Krieg & Kimberly S. Moreau
Justice Society: World War II	April 27, 2021	Jeff Wamester	Meghan Fitzmartin & Jeremy Adams	Jim Krieg & Kimberly S. Moreau
Batman: The Long Halloween - Part One	June 22, 2021	Chris Palmer	Tim Sheridan	Jim Krieg & Kimberly S. Moreau
Batman: The Long Halloween - Part Two	July 27, 2021	Chris Palmer	Tim Sheridan	Jim Krieg & Kimberly S. Moreau
Green Lantern: Beware My Power	July 25, 2022	Jeff Wamester	John Semper & Ernie Altbacker	Sam Register & Jim Krieg
Legion of Super-Heroes	February 7, 2023	Jeff Wamester	Josie Campbell	Jim Krieg, Butch Lukic & Kimberly S. Moreau
Justice League: Warworld	July 25, 2023	Jeff Wamester	Jeremy Adams, Ernie Altbacker & Josie Campbell	Jim Krieg & Kimberly S. Moreau
Justice League: Crisis on Infinite Earths - Part One	January 9, 2024	Jeff Wamester	Jim Krieg	Jim Krieg & Kimberly S. Moreau
Justice League: Crisis on Infinite Earths - Part Two	April 23, 2024	Jeff Wamester	Jim Krieg	Jim Krieg & Kimberly S. Moreau
Justice League: Crisis on Infinite Earths - Part Three	July 16, 2024	Jeff Wamester	Jim Krieg	Jim Krieg & Kimberly S. Moreau

== Short films ==
Film	U.S. release date	Director(s)	Writer(s)	Producer(s)	Home media release
Nightwing and Robin	January 14, 2015	Bruce Timm	Greg Pak, Scott Lobdell & Charles Soule	Greg Pak, Scott Lobdell & Charles Soule	Justice League: Throne of Atlantis
Adam Strange	May 5, 2020	Butch Lukic	Butch Lukic & J.M. DeMatteis	Amy McKenna & Butch Lukic	Justice League Dark: Apokolips War; DC Showcase Animated Shorts - Batman: Death in the Family
Kamandi: The Last Boy on Earth!	April 27, 2021	Milo Neuman	Paul Giacoppo	Paul Giacoppo	Justice Society: World War II; DC Showcase Animated Shorts - Constantine: The House of Mystery
The Losers	June 22, 2021	Milo Neuman	Tim Sheridan	Jim Krieg, Sam Register, Rick Morales & Alyessa Ornelas	Batman: The Long Halloween - Part One; DC Showcase Animated Shorts - Constantine: The House of Mystery
Blue Beetle	July 27, 2021	Milo Neuman	Jeremy Adams	Jennifer Keene	Batman: The Long Halloween - Part Two; DC Showcase Animated Shorts - Constantine: The House of Mystery
Constantine: The House of Mystery	May 3, 2022	Matt Peters	Ernie Altbacker	Jim Krieg & Rick Morales	DC Showcase Animated Shorts - Constantine: The House of Mystery

== Other media ==
=== Web series ===
Title	Episodes	U.S. release date	Director	Writer	Producer	Production companies	Network
Constantine: City of Demons	5 (original version)	March 24, 2018	Doug Murphy	J. M. DeMatteis	Butch Lukic	DC Entertainment; Phantom Four Films; Blue Ribbon Content; Digital eMation Inc. Berlanti Productions; Warner Bros. Animation	CW Seed
Constantine: City of Demons	2 (re-version)	January 17, 2019	Doug Murphy	J. M. DeMatteis	Butch Lukic	DC Entertainment; Phantom Four Films; Blue Ribbon Content; Digital eMation Inc. Berlanti Productions; Warner Bros. Animation	CW Seed

=== Digital comics ===
Title	Issue(s)	Publication date(s)	Writer	Artist(s)	Colorist(s)	Publisher
Suicide Squad: Hell to Pay	12	March 21, 2018	Jeff Parker	Cat Staggs, Agustin Padilla, Stefano Raffaele & Mathew Dow Smith	Tony Aviña	DC Digital First
The Death of Superman: Part 1	12	August 1 - October 17, 2018	Louise Simonson	Cat Staggs	Wendy Broome	DC Digital First

==== Collected editions ====
Title	Material collected	Publication date	Publisher	ISBN
Suicide Squad: Hell to Pay	Suicide Squad: Hell to Pay #1-12	February 19, 2019	DC Comics	1401287786, 978-1302957308
The Death of Superman: The Wake	The Death of Superman: Part 1 #1-12	November 26, 2019	DC Comics	1779501137, 978-1779501134

=== Extended setting ===
- Super Friends (1973–1985)
- DC Animated Universe (1992–2006)
- Teen Titans (2003–2006)
- Teen Titans Go! (2013–present)
- Teen Titans Go! vs. Teen Titans (2019)

== List of characters and cast members ==
Character	First story arc films (2013–2020)	Second story arc films (2020–2024)	Tie-in media (2015–2022)
Adam Strange	—N/a	Brian Bloom	Charlie Weber
Alberto Falcone	—N/a	Jack Quaid	—N/a
Alfred Pennyworth	James Garrett; David McCallum	Alastair Duncan	—N/a
Amanda Waller	Vanessa Williams	—N/a	—N/a
Anti-Monitor	—N/a	Ato Essandoh	—N/a
Aquaman	Cary Elwes; Matt Lanter	Liam McIntyre	—N/a
Barbara Eileen-Gordon	—N/a	Amy Landecker	—N/a
Batgirl	Peyton R. List	Gideon Adlon	—N/a
Batman (Bruce Wayne)	Kevin Conroy; Jason O'Mara	Jensen Ackles; Kevin Conroy	—N/a
Batman (Terry McGinnis)	—N/a	Will Friedle	—N/a
Beast Boy	Brandon Soo Hoo	—N/a	—N/a
Black Canary	—N/a	Elysia Rotaru	—N/a
Black Manta	Dave Fennoy	—N/a	—N/a
Blue Beetle (Jaime Rayes)	Jake T. Austin	—N/a	—N/a
Blue Beetle (Ted Kord)	—N/a	Matt Lanter	Matt Lanter
Brainiac	—N/a	Darin De Paul	—N/a
Brainiac 2	—N/a	Ben Diskin	—N/a
Brainiac 3	—N/a	Zeno Robinson	—N/a
Brainiac 4	—N/a	Robbie Daymond	—N/a
Brainiac 5	—N/a	Harry Shum Jr.	—N/a
Calendar Man	—N/a	David Dastmalchian	—N/a
Captain Boomerang	Liam McIntyre; James Patrick Stuart	—N/a	—N/a
Carmine Falcone	—N/a	Titus Welliver	—N/a
Catwoman	Jennifer Morrison	Naya Rivera	—N/a
Chas Chandler	—N/a	—N/a	Damian O'Hare
Cyborg	Michael B. Jordan; Shemar Moore	—N/a	—N/a
Cyborg Superman	Patrick Fabian	—N/a	—N/a
Darkseid	Steve Blum; Tony Todd	—N/a	—N/a
Deathstroke	Thomas Gibson; Miguel Ferrer; Ron Perlman	—N/a	—N/a
Doctor Fate (Kent Nelson)	—N/a	Keith Ferguson	—N/a
Doctor Fate (Steel Maxum)	Greg Grunberg	—N/a	—N/a
Etrigan	Dee Bradley Baker	—N/a	—N/a
Flash (Barry Allen)	Justin Chambers; Christopher Gorham; Jason Spisak	Matt Bomer	—N/a
Flash (Jay Garrick)	—N/a	Armen Taylor	—N/a
Gilda Dent	—N/a	Julie Nathanson	—N/a
Green Arrow	—N/a	Jimmi Simpson	—N/a
Green Lantern (John Stewart)	Roger Cross	Aldis Hodge	—N/a
Green Lantern/Parallax (Hal Jordan)	Nathan Fillion; Justin Kirk	Nolan North	—N/a
Harbinger	—N/a	Kari Wahlgren	—N/a
Harley Quinn	Tara Strong; Hynden Walch	—N/a	—N/a
Hawkgirl	—N/a	Jamie Gray Hyder	—N/a
Hawkman (Carter Hall)	—N/a	Omid Abtahi; Geoffrey Arend	—N/a
Hawkman (Katar Hol)	Cameo	Geoffrey Arend	—N/a
Hourman	—N/a	Matthew Mercer	—N/a
Huntress	—N/a	Erika Ishii	—N/a
Iris West	Jennifer Hale	Ashleigh LaThrop	—N/a
James Gordon	Bruce Thomas	Billy Burke	—N/a
Jason Blood	Ray Chase	—N/a	Ray Chase
John Constantine	Matt Ryan	Nolan North; Matt Ryan	Matt Ryan
Joker	Dee Bradley Baker; Jason Spisak	Troy Baker; Mark Hamill	—N/a
Jonah Hex	—N/a	Troy Baker	—N/a
Jonathan Kent	Paul Eiding	Neil Flynn	—N/a
Kamandi	—N/a	Will Friedle	Cameron Monaghan
Lex Luthor	Steven Blum; Rainn Wilson	Zachary Quinto; Corey Stoll	—N/a
Lois Lane	Dana Delany; Juliet Landau; Rebecca Romijn	Alexandra Daddario	—N/a
Mad Hatter	Robin Atkin Downes	John DiMaggio	—N/a
Martian Manhunter	Nyambi Nyambi	Ike Amadi	—N/a
Martha Kent	Jennifer Hale	Bellamy Young	—N/a
Mon-El	—N/a	Yuri Lowenthal	—N/a
Monitor	—N/a	Jonathan Adams	—N/a
Ocean Master	Steve Blum; James Patrick Stuart; Sam Witwer	—N/a	—N/a
Penguin	Cameo	David Dastmalchian	—N/a
Perry White	Rocky Carroll	Piotr Michael	—N/a
Poison Ivy	Peyton List	Katee Sackhoff	—N/a
Professor Zoom	C. Thomas Howell	—N/a	—N/a
Psycho-Pirate	—N/a	Geoffrey Arend	—N/a
Ra's al Ghul	Terrence C. Carson; Giancarlo Esposito	—N/a	—N/a
Raven	Taissa Farmiga	—N/a	—N/a
Renee Montoya	Vanessa Marshall	Alyssa Diaz	—N/a
Robin (Damian Wayne)	Stuart Allan	Zach Callison	—N/a
Robin/Nightwing (Dick Grayson); Robin (Earth-Two)	Sean Maher	Zach Callison	—N/a
Scarecrow	Chris Cox; Michael Rosenbaum	Robin Atkin Downes	—N/a
Shazam	Sean Astin; Steven Blum; Zach Callison; Jennifer Hale	—N/a	—N/a
Sinestro	—N/a	Rick D. Wasserman	—N/a
Solomon Grundy	Rick D. Wasserman	Fred Tatasciore; Darin De Paul	—N/a
Spectre	—N/a	Lou Diamond Phillips	Lou Diamond Phillips
Starfire	Kari Wahlgren	—N/a	—N/a
Steel	Khary Payton; Cress Williams	—N/a	—N/a
Supergirl	—N/a	Meg Donnelly	—N/a
Superman; Superman (Earth-Two)	Sam Daly; Jerry O'Connell; Alan Tudyk	Darren Criss	—N/a
Steve Trevor	Jeffrey Donovan; George Newbern; James Patrick Stuart	Chris Diamantopoulos	—N/a
Swamp Thing	Roger Cross	—N/a	—N/a
Talia al Ghul	Morena Baccarin	—N/a	—N/a
Talon	Jeremy Sisto	—N/a	—N/a
Terra	Christina Ricci	—N/a	—N/a
Thomas Wayne; Batman (Flashpoint)	Kevin Conroy; Kevin McKidd	Robin Atkin Downes	—N/a
Trigon	Jon Bernthal; John DiMaggio	—N/a	—N/a
Two-Face	Dave Boat	Josh Duhamel	—N/a
Vixen	—N/a	Keesha Sharp	—N/a
Wonder Woman; Wonder Woman (Earth-Two)	Rosario Dawson; Vanessa Marshall; Michelle Monaghan	Stana Katic	—N/a
Zatanna	Camilla Luddington	—N/a	Camilla Luddington

== Reception ==
=== Sales ===
Sales figures represent DVD and Blu-ray sales in the United States. International sales, digital sales, and rentals are not included.

Title	U.S. release date	Gross video sales	Rotten Tomatoes	IGN	Ref.
Justice League: The Flashpoint Paradox	July 30, 2013	$5,263,783	100% (5 reviews)		
Justice League: War	February 4, 2014	$5,806,863	50% (6 reviews)		
Son of Batman	April 22, 2014	$7,035,303	64% (11 reviews)		
Justice League: Throne of Atlantis	January 13, 2015	$4,661,509	63% (8 reviews)		
Batman vs. Robin	April 7, 2015	$4,275,014	100% (5 reviews)		
Batman: Bad Blood	January 20, 2016	$4,884,919	100% (5 reviews)		
Justice League vs. Teen Titans	March 29, 2016	$4,680,315	80% (5 reviews)		
Justice League Dark	January 24, 2017	$3,321,532	78% (9 reviews)		
Teen Titans: The Judas Contract	April 4, 2017	$3,279,855	83% (6 reviews)		
Suicide Squad: Hell to Pay	March 27, 2018	$2,880,096	88% (8 reviews)		
The Death of Superman	July 24, 2018	$6,551,111	92% (13 reviews)		
Constantine: City of Demons – The Movie	October 9, 2018	$1,699,592			
Reign of the Supermen	January 29, 2019	$3,797,618			
Batman: Hush	July 20, 2019	$3,603,543	88% (17 reviews)		
The Death and Return of Superman	October 1, 2019				
Wonder Woman: Bloodlines	October 5, 2019	$1,723,810	88% (8 reviews)		
Justice League Dark: Apokolips War	May 5, 2020	$5,576,143	100% (18 reviews)		
Superman: Man of Tomorrow	August 23, 2020	$3,460,174	93% (14 reviews)	7/10	
Justice Society: World War II	April 27, 2021	$3,676,453	76% (17 reviews)	9/10	
Batman: The Long Halloween – Part One	June 22, 2021	$3,621,499	100% (21 reviews)	8/10	
Batman: The Long Halloween – Part Two	July 27, 2021	$2,565,761	100% (15 reviews)	9/10	
DC Showcase Animated Shorts – Constantine: The House of Mystery	May 3, 2022				
Green Lantern: Beware My Power	July 25, 2022	$798,310	56% (9 reviews)	4/10	
Batman: The Long Halloween – Deluxe Edition	September 20, 2022				
Legion of Super-Heroes	February 7, 2023	$962,432	60% (5 reviews)		
Justice League: Warworld	July 25, 2023	$995,545	50% (6 reviews)	6/10	
Justice League: Crisis on Infinite Earths – Part One	January 9, 2024	$839,881	88% (8 reviews)	6/10	
Justice League: Crisis on Infinite Earths – Part Two	April 23, 2024		17% (6 reviews)	4/10	
Justice League: Crisis on Infinite Earths – Part Three	July 16, 2024		20% (5 reviews)	4/10	

=== Accolades ===
In 2019, Suicide Squad: Hell to Pay and The Death of Superman were nominated for the Golden Reel Award in the category of "Outstanding Achievement in Sound Editing – Sound Effects, Foley, Music, Dialogue and ADR for Non-Theatrical Animated Long Form Broadcast Media".

In 2020, Superman: Man of Tomorrow was nominated for a Critics' Choice Award in the category of "Best Superhero Movie".

== See also ==
- DC Animated Universe (1992–2006)
- Arrowverse (2012–2023)
- DC Extended Universe (2013–2023)
- DC Universe (2024–present)
