= Batman: The Long Halloween =

Limited comic book series by Jeph Loeb (1996–1997)

- First trade paperback cover of Batman: The Long Halloween

Publication information
- Publisher: DC Comics
- Schedule: Monthly
- Format: Limited series
- Genre: Superhero, noir, mystery
- Publication date: December 1996–July 1997
- No. of issues: 13
- Main character(s): Batman; Jim Gordon; Harvey Dent; Carmine Falcone; Catwoman

Creative team
- Written by: Jeph Loeb
- Artist: Tim Sale
- Letterer(s): Comicraft; Richard Starkings
- Colorist: Gregory Wright
- Editor(s): Archie Goodwin; Chuck Kim

Collected editions
- Trade Paperback: ISBN 1563894696
- Hardcover: ISBN 1563894270
- Trade Paperback (Titan Books): ISBN 1840230541
- Absolute Edition: ISBN 1401212824
- 2011 Trade Paperback: ISBN 1401232590
- Noir: ISBN 1401248837
- Deluxe Edition: ISBN 1779512694
- The Batman Box Set: ISBN 1779514298

Batman: The Long Halloween is a 13-issue American comic book limited series written by Jeph Loeb with art by Tim Sale. It was originally published by DC Comics in 1996 and 1997. It was the follow-up to three Batman: Legends of the Dark Knight Halloween Specials which were reprinted in Batman: Haunted Knight by the same creative team. The series' success led to Loeb and Sale to reteam for two sequels, Batman: Dark Victory and Catwoman: When in Rome, which are set concurrently. A third sequel, a 10-issue limited series entitled The Last Halloween, began publication on September 25, 2024.

Set during Batman's early days of crime-fighting, the story follows the Dark Knight as he partners with District Attorney Harvey Dent and Captain James Gordon to uncover the identity of a mysterious killer known as Holiday, who murders people on holidays, one each month. The series is notable for its exploration of the transformation of Gotham City’s criminal underworld from traditional organized crime to the emergence of costumed supervillains, and it serves as an origin story for Two-Face, incorporating elements of the story in Batman: Annual #14.

In continuity terms, The Long Halloween continues the story of "Batman: Year One" for the characters of Batman, Gordon, Catwoman, and Falcone, and is considered to replace the earlier effort "Batman: Year Two" in the character's continuity.

Critically acclaimed for its noir-inspired storytelling and character development, The Long Halloween is considered one of the definitive Batman stories. Its influence extends to multiple media adaptations, including Christopher Nolan's The Dark Knight trilogy (2005–2012), the television series Gotham (2014–2019) and Matt Reeves' The Batman (2022). The story was also adapted into a two-part animated film released in 2021, which closely follows the narrative and themes of the original comic.

== Plot ==
At a wedding in June, Gotham City mob boss Carmine Falcone tries to pressure Bruce Wayne to help launder his money, but Bruce refuses. Later, Bruce (as Batman) returns to investigate Falcone's penthouse but finds Catwoman similarly engaged. Batman meets with district attorney Harvey Dent and police captain Jim Gordon. The three agree to a pact to end Falcone's crime reign, bending but never breaking the law to achieve it.

Bruce, on the board of the Gotham City Bank, uses his sway and influence as Batman to oust the current president Richard Daniel and take over to rid the bank of its Falcone money. Under orders from his uncle, Falcone's nephew, Johnny Viti, assassinates Daniel. Viti himself is killed on Halloween by an unknown assailant, leaving behind an untraceable pistol, a nipple from a baby bottle used as a crude silencer, and a jack-o-lantern. Catwoman leads Batman to a warehouse where Falcone has been forced to stash his funds. Batman and Dent set the warehouse on fire to destroy the money. Falcone responds by hiring the Sullivan family, a gang of Irish hitmen led by Donald "Donny Boy" Sullivan, to destroy Dent's home with a bomb, but he and his wife Gilda survive. On Thanksgiving, the hitmen themselves are killed by an unknown agent who leaves the same type of pistol and silencer behind, along with a Thanksgiving decoration. The killer is dubbed “Holiday” by the media. Milos Grapa, Falcone's bodyguard, is killed similarly on Christmas. Holiday is believed to be a rival of the Falcone family.

On New Year's Eve, Batman stops the Joker from using deadly laughing gas to kill everyone in Gotham Square. Meanwhile, Dent's corrupt assistant, Vernon Fields, finds evidence supposedly linking Falcone to Wayne. Aboard the Falcone yacht, Falcone's son, Alberto, is killed by Holiday on New Year's Eve. Over the next few months, Holiday's targets change to that of the Maronis, a rival crime gang in Gotham. A war between the Falcones and Maronis breaks out, and Falcone is forced to turn to enlist Gotham's "freaks" (such as the Riddler, Poison Ivy, the Scarecrow, and Mad Hatter) to hold his ground. Per Falcone's instructions, Poison Ivy ensnares Bruce Wayne on Valentine's Day, coercing him into laundering money for Falcone. This unintentionally takes Batman out of the equation. It is not until Saint Patrick's Day that Selina Kyle figures out what has happened to him and, as Catwoman, frees him from Poison Ivy's clutches. The Riddler becomes the first target to be spared by Holiday on April Fool's Day, which Batman comes to suspect as being a message from Holiday to Falcone.

Meanwhile, the pistols left behind by Holiday and the bullets gleaned from Holiday's victims are traced to a Chinatown neighborhood, but the gunmaker is found dead as Holiday's victim on Mother's Day. On the following day, Dent follows up on Vernon's investigation and has Bruce arrested, claiming that as Bruce's father Thomas Wayne saved Falcone's life after he was shot, that Bruce is loyal to the Falcones. However, Bruce's butler, Alfred, testifies that Thomas Wayne's report never came to light due to police corruption, which helps declare Bruce innocent, especially in light of the murder of the Gotham City coroner on Independence Day.

Sal Maroni, having been arrested earlier, offers to testify against Falcone after his father is killed on Father's Day. During the trial, he throws a vial of acid—secretly given to him earlier by Vernon—at Dent, disfiguring half of Dent's face. Dent is rushed to a hospital but escapes into the sewers, befriending Solomon Grundy when he encounters him. Gordon deduces Dent may be Holiday, but Batman refuses to believe it until he can talk to Dent himself.

After Falcone's sister, Carla Viti, is murdered on Falcone's birthday in August, Batman questions Julian Gregory Day, the Calendar Man, on where to find Dent. Day suggests that, since it is Labor Day, Holiday will try to kill Maroni. Batman stages a plan with Gordon to move Maroni, giving Holiday the means and opportunity. During the transfer, Holiday murders Maroni, but Batman – having disguised himself as one of the security guards – takes him down. Holiday is revealed to be Alberto Falcone, son of Carmine Falcone, who had faked his death.

On Halloween, Dent resurfaces as Two-Face. He releases most of the super-criminals from Arkham Asylum, then seeks out and kills both Carmine Falcone and Vernon, despite Batman's attempts to stop him. Falcone's daughter, Sofia, is also apparently killed in a struggle with Catwoman.

His revenge complete, Two-Face turns himself in to Gordon and Batman but tells them that there were two Holiday killers. Gordon is confused, as Alberto has already confessed to all of the killings. While Batman initially dismisses Two-Face's statement, he points out the fact that Two-Face, having killed Falcone and the last of his collaborators on Halloween, could technically be considered Holiday. While Two-Face is imprisoned at Arkham along with the recaptured criminals, Alberto can delay his execution based on insanity.

Months later, on Christmas Eve, Gilda is packing boxes to leave Gotham but takes one box to her furnace, containing a pistol, a hat, and what appears to be her husband's clothing. As she burns the items, she thinks about how she took it upon herself to start the Holiday killings to try to end Falcone's hold on Gotham and reduce her husband's workload so that they would have time together. She has the wild suspicion that Alberto was lying, instead choosing to believe that Dent himself had taken up the killings on New Year's Eve and that the two were finally working together by sharing secrets. Nevertheless, she is content with Alberto as their scapegoat, knowing the authorities are incapable of finding the other Holiday killer without Dent on their side and states that she still believes her husband can be cured.

== Background ==
The project was sparked when group editor Archie Goodwin approached Jeph Loeb and Tim Sale at San Diego Comic-Con and asked if the two of them wanted to do more Batman work. Jeph Loeb has stated that the genesis of the story was influenced by writer Mark Waid, who, when told that Loeb was working on a story set in the Year One continuity, suggested focusing on Harvey Dent's years prior to becoming Two-Face, as that had not been depicted in depth since the original Year One story. Goodwin gave the comic its title after fellow writer Mike Friedrich suggested telling it over 13 issues from Halloween to Halloween, which also became an integral part of the story.

== Collected editions ==
The entire series has been collected in trade paperbacks, a hardcover, an absolute edition, a noir edition, a deluxe edition, and a DC Compact Comics edition.

- Trade paperback (ISBN 1563894696) was released in January 1998.
- Hardcover (ISBN 1563894270) was released in February 1999.
- Trade paperback, Titan Books (ISBN 1840230541), was released in January 1999.
- Absolute Edition (ISBN 1401212824) was released in April 2007, in hardcover only.
- New trade paperback version (ISBN 9781401232597) was released in October 2011.
- Noir Edition (ISBN 1401248837) was released in October 2014, in hardcover only.
- Deluxe Edition (ISBN 1779512694) was released in October 2021, in hardcover only.
- The Batman Box Set (ISBN 1779514298) was released in March 2022, collecting the trade paperbacks of Year One, The Long Halloween, and Ego and Other Tails in a slipcase with art by Jim Lee. Director Matt Reeves cited the three graphic novels as the major influences for The Batman.
- DC Compact Comics Edition (ISBN 1799502880) was released in October 2025.

== Reception ==
Batman: The Long Halloween has received positive reviews and is praised as one of the definitive Batman stories to date due to Jeph Loeb's involving storyline and Tim Sale's dark, moody art.

Yannick Belzil of The 11th Hour said that "Jeph Loeb has crafted a story that is unique to the characters. It's a complex murder mystery, but it's also a Batman story." Belzil added: "Buoyed by a film noir-ish plot that features a Gothic twist on the gangster/murder mystery plot, terrific character-based subplots, and beautiful, cinematic art, [The Long Halloween is] an addition to your collection that you won't regret." Hilary Goldstein of IGN Comics praised Loeb's story as "tight, engrossing, and intelligent writing that never betrays the characters", adding that he "mixes Batman and Bruce Wayne's lives as well as anyone has, and brilliantly demonstrates the bond of brotherhood shared by Batman, Jim Gordon and then District Attorney Harvey Dent." IGN later ranked The Long Halloween #4 on a list of the 25 best Batman graphic novels, The Long Halloween has "all the ingredients of a classic Batman story: a mysterious killer, appearances by notable villains, striking visuals, and an imperfect ending." Loeb is credited for making Calendar Man "interesting and necessary." Similarly, Rhenn Taguiam of GameRant ranked it as the fourth best Batman story. He praised it for its depiction of Gotham and its exploration of Harvey Dent's transformation into Two-Face, he regarded the story as a quintessential Batman tale. CBR's Guillermo Kurten ranks The Long Halloween as one of the top Batman miniseries, specifically placing it at number six. He praises it as one of the most influential Batman stories, highlighting its blend of crime-noir elements with Batman's role as the "World's Greatest Detective." Kurten commends Tim Sale's atmospheric and stylish artwork, which captures the dark, noir tone of the series.

== In other media ==
=== Television ===
The influence of The Long Halloween storyline can be seen in television adaptations of Batman. In the fourth season of Gotham, several elements from the storyline were adapted, contributing to the show's narrative arc.

=== Films ===
- The Long Halloween significantly influenced Christopher Nolan's Batman trilogy, especially The Dark Knight (2008).
- The Long Halloween heavily influenced The Batman (2022), shaping its portrayal of a year-two Batman and the evolution of key characters like Selina Kyle and Oswald Cobblepot.
- A two-part animated direct-to-video film adaptation of the limited series was released as part of the Tomorrowverse film arc. Part One was released on June 27, 2021, and Part Two was released on July 27 the same year. A deluxe edition combining both films was released on September 20, 2022. The films feature the voice talents of Jensen Ackles as Batman/Bruce Wayne, Josh Duhamel as Harvey Dent, Billy Burke as James Gordon, Titus Welliver as Carmine Falcone, David Dastmalchian as Calendar Man, Troy Baker as Joker, Amy Landecker as Barbara Gordon, Julie Nathanson as Gilda Dent, Jack Quaid as Alberto, Fred Tatasciore as Solomon Grundy, Jim Pirri as Sal Maroni, Alastair Duncan as Alfred, and Naya Rivera as Catwoman in her final film role.

=== Video games ===
The 2013 game Batman: Arkham Origins offered a pre-order bonus pack that included an optional suit for Batman inspired by his look in The Long Halloween.

=== Miscellaneous ===
The Long Halloween was adapted as an audio drama in 2025 as part of the DC High Volume podcast. The cast included Jason Spisak as Batman/Bruce Wayne, Jay Paulson as Lt. James Gordon, Reba Buhr as Catwoman/Seline Kyle, Adam O’Byrne as Harvey Dent/Two-Face, Mike Starr as Carmine Falcone, Simon Vance as Alfred Pennyworth, Dan Gill as The Joker, Jesse Burch as The Riddler, Michelle Lukes as Poison Ivy, and Kevin Smith as The Penguin.
