= Batman: The Long Halloween (film) =

2021 American mystery thriller film

- Deluxe Edition 4K Ultra HD cover
- Directed by: Chris Palmer
- Written by: Tim Sheridan
- Based on: Batman: The Long Halloween by: Jeph Loeb; Tim Sale
- Produced by: Jim Krieg; Kimberly S. Moreau
- Starring: Jensen Ackles; Josh Duhamel; Naya Rivera
- Edited by: John Soares
- Music by: Michael Gatt
- Production companies: Warner Bros. Animation; DC Entertainment
- Distributed by: Warner Bros. Home Entertainment
- Release dates: June 22, 2021 (Part 1); July 27, 2021 (Part 2); September 20, 2022 (Deluxe Edition)
- Running time: 85 minutes (Part 1); 87 minutes (Part 2); 168 minutes (Deluxe Edition)
- Country: United States
- Language: English

Batman: The Long Halloween is a 2021 American two-part animated direct-to-video superhero film produced by Warner Bros. Animation and DC Entertainment, based on the DC Comics storyline of the same name. Part 1 is the 45th film, and Part 2 is the 46th film, of the DC Universe Animated Original Movies, with both parts serving as the third and fourth installments of the DC Animated Movie Universe's second phase, and the nineteenth and twentienth overall. The film is directed by Chris Palmer and stars the voices of Jensen Ackles, Josh Duhamel and Naya Rivera in her final film role before her death the year prior and is dedicated to her memory. In both parts of the film, Batman attempts to unravel the mystery of murders committed on holidays throughout the year, and uncover the true identity of the serial killer Holiday.

Part 1 was released on June 27, 2021, and Part 2 was released on July 27 the same year. A deluxe edition combining both films was released on September 20, 2022.

== Plot ==
=== Part One ===
Hoping to solicit help in laundering his funds, Gotham City mob boss Carmine Falcone meets with billionaire Bruce Wayne under the guise of repairing the relationship between their families. Bruce declines.

On Halloween, someone murders Johnny Viti, Falcone's nephew, and leaves a jack-o'-lantern and the hand gun at the crime scene. Gotham City PD Captain James Gordon suspects Falcone is responsible because Viti was planning to testify against him. Gordon, Batman, and newly elected District Attorney Harvey Dent swear to take down Falcone without breaking the law.

Catwoman leads Batman to Falcone's cash stockpile, with Harvey following. Based on a coin flip, Harvey decides to burn the money rather than move it legally and risk Falcone stopping them. In retaliation, Falcone hires triad member Mickey Chen to bomb Harvey's house. Harvey and his wife Gilda survive but are hospitalized. Chasing Chen down to the sewers, Batman runs into Solomon Grundy. Batman convinces Grundy to spare Chen and takes him to the GCPD for questioning. Lacking evidence of his involvement in the bombing, Batman and Gordon are forced to release him.

On Thanksgiving, Falcone's son Alberto sends roses to Harvey with a mocking "get well soon" card in his father's name. After finding out about this, an angry Falcone tells Alberto to never speak on behalf of the family again, especially to the Dents. Harvey escapes from the hospital and meets Gordon, who gives him a gun for protection. That night, Viti's murderer kills Chen and his associates before leaving the pistol and a Thanksgiving decoration behind.

By Christmas Eve, Gordon and Batman question Calendar Man in Arkham Asylum on the identity of the murderer who has now been nicknamed "Holiday". Calendar Man names Falcone, Sal Maroni, and Harvey as suspects and calls Batman's war on crime a "joke". Batman then realizes that Joker has escaped from Arkham. Not wanting Holiday to replace him as Gotham's most notorious criminal, Joker confronts Harvey in his home and threatens to kill him if he is proven to be Holiday. Batman visits Maroni, who Joker also attacked. Meanwhile, Joker harasses Falcone, asking that he share any new information about Holiday. Falcone's bodyguard Milos Grapa chases Joker out of the building and is killed by Holiday. Batman arrives and finds a Christmas snow globe, the pistol and Joker playing cards next to Grapa's corpse.

Bruce attends a New Year's Eve yacht party celebrating Gotham's children's clinic, hosted by Falcone, who calls out Bruce during his speech as the son he never had, angering Alberto. Bruce meets with Selina Kyle, who calls off their relationship due to their conflicting secret identities. Joker attempts to gas a concurrent celebration in Gotham Square using a stolen crop duster plane, hoping that Holiday is among the crowd. Meanwhile, Selina meets with Alberto to learn about the Falcone family. Alberto laments about never being respected by his father, who also rejected his fiancée from Oxford University. Batman foils Joker's scheme, and when Joker remarks that he "loves a good puzzle", Batman deduces that Alberto, who would benefit the most from killing his father's enemies and is known for his love of puzzles, is the killer.

At the yacht, Batman accuses Alberto of being Holiday, targeting Falcone's associates to gain power within the family. Alberto denies the allegations, citing he no longer wishes to be in his father's shadow, but never wanted control of the family business. As the New Year starts, Alberto is shot dead by Holiday and falls into the water, where the yacht's propellers cut his body to pieces. Batman pursues Holiday, who escapes via speedboat leaving behind the gun and a Champagne glass. As the ship is evacuated, Batman tells Gordon and Harvey to assign a protective detail to Falcone. Facing the fact that Joker and Alberto were not Holiday, the three wonder who Holiday is and who is next on his hit list.

In a post-credits scene, Falcone pressures Bruce to help launder his funds during Alberto's funeral. When Bruce refuses, Falcone introduces the woman accompanying him. Vines grip Bruce's arm as they shake hands and cause his eyes to turn green. The woman is Poison Ivy and has taken control of him.

=== Part Two ===
In the three months since Alberto's death, the Holiday Killer has targeted the Falcone and Maroni families on Valentine's Day, Saint Patrick's Day, and April Fools' Day. Meanwhile, Bruce has signed many of his assets to Falcone under Ivy's influence. Catwoman subdues Ivy and rescues Bruce. Alfred calls the police and Bruce's lawyers to arrest Ivy and stop the transactions.

On Mother's Day, while investigating the murder of Chong, a black market arms dealer posing as a teahouse owner, the GCPD discovers he was supplying Holiday with firearms. Later that night, Scarecrow escapes from Arkham Asylum and injects Batman with fear toxin during a confrontation. Forced to relive his parents' deaths, Batman is eventually found by Catwoman and taken home.

Gordon and Harvey question Bruce about his family's connections to Falcone. Bruce recalls how, as a boy, he watched his father save Falcone's life following an assassination attempt by Luigi, Maroni's father. Bruce assures Gordon and Harvey that any relationship between his family and Falcone ended after the death of his parents in what he believed was retaliation for saving Carmine.

On Father's Day, Holiday kills Luigi, prompting Maroni to approach Harvey and offer to testify against Falcone in exchange for immunity. Catwoman later follows Falcone to a cemetery and sees him pay a hitman.

On the Fourth of July, Batman is captured by Scarecrow and Mad Hatter as they rob a bank for Falcone. Batman escapes and defeats them as they drop off the cash in the cemetery. Meanwhile, Falcone's hitman attacks Harvey and Gilda. Catwoman intervenes, but the hitman knocks out both of them. Harvey awakens to find the hitman dead and one of Holiday's guns nearby. He flees as the police arrive.

Carla Viti, Johnny's mother and Falcone's sister, publicly accuses Harvey of being Holiday. While Harvey has Maroni in court, Batman meets Gordon and reveals that he found Holiday's guns in the Dents' basement, along with an Oxford University Pennant. At the court, Maroni accuses Harvey of being Holiday and throws acid in his face. Harvey is hospitalized but escapes, only to be picked up by Falcone's men. Harvey realizes it is a trap, and the two men are here to kill him for Johnny and Alberto's deaths. Harvey kills his guards and flees into the sewers, where he is nurtured by Solomon Grundy. On Falcone's birthday, Carla is killed by Holiday.

On Labor Day, Harvey and Grundy attack Maroni's prison convoy. Batman, disguised as a guard, subdues Grundy, but Maroni is shot by Holiday from another building, and all three criminals escape. Batman asks Catwoman about her obsession with the Falcone family. She confesses that Falcone is her father and only wants to know her mother's name.

Harvey, now calling himself Two-Face, and Grundy attack Arkham and free several inmates; Poison Ivy, Scarecrow, and Mad Hatter engage the GCPD while Two-Face, Grundy, Joker, and Penguin attack Falcone's building. They overwhelm Falcone's guards and his daughter Sofia. Two-Face prepares to flip a coin to decide whether Falcone will live or die. Batman and Catwoman arrive and defeat the rogues, but cannot prevent Two-Face from shooting Falcone. Distraught, Sofia tries to kill Two-Face with his own gun, but fails. She then trips over Poison Ivy's vines and, despite Catwoman's efforts, falls out a window to her death. Catwoman reveals her face to Falcone, who mentions the name "Louisa", and Batman inadvertently reveals his identity while offering medical help, which Falcone declines before dying in Bruce's arms. Two-Face turns himself over to Gordon, claiming responsibility for the murders.

Batman confronts Gilda, the woman Alberto mentioned the night he died and the true killer. She admits she hated Falcone, who forced Alberto to annul their marriage and forced her into getting an abortion, which ultimately left her infertile. Seeking justice, she married Harvey, believing he was her best chance to take down Falcone, but took matters into her own hands after realizing that he couldn't confront his demons as she could. Sure that Holiday is over, Batman leaves, not responding when Gilda asks if he plans to tell Gordon the truth.

On Halloween, children start trick-or-treating again. That night, (Note: In a post-credits scene.) Flash (Note: Flash previously appeared in Justice Society: World War II.) and Green Arrow (Note: Green Arrow later appears as a member of Justice League in Green Lantern: Beware My Power.) visit Bruce. (Note: This story is continued in Justice League: Crisis on Infinite Earths – Part One.)

== Cast ==
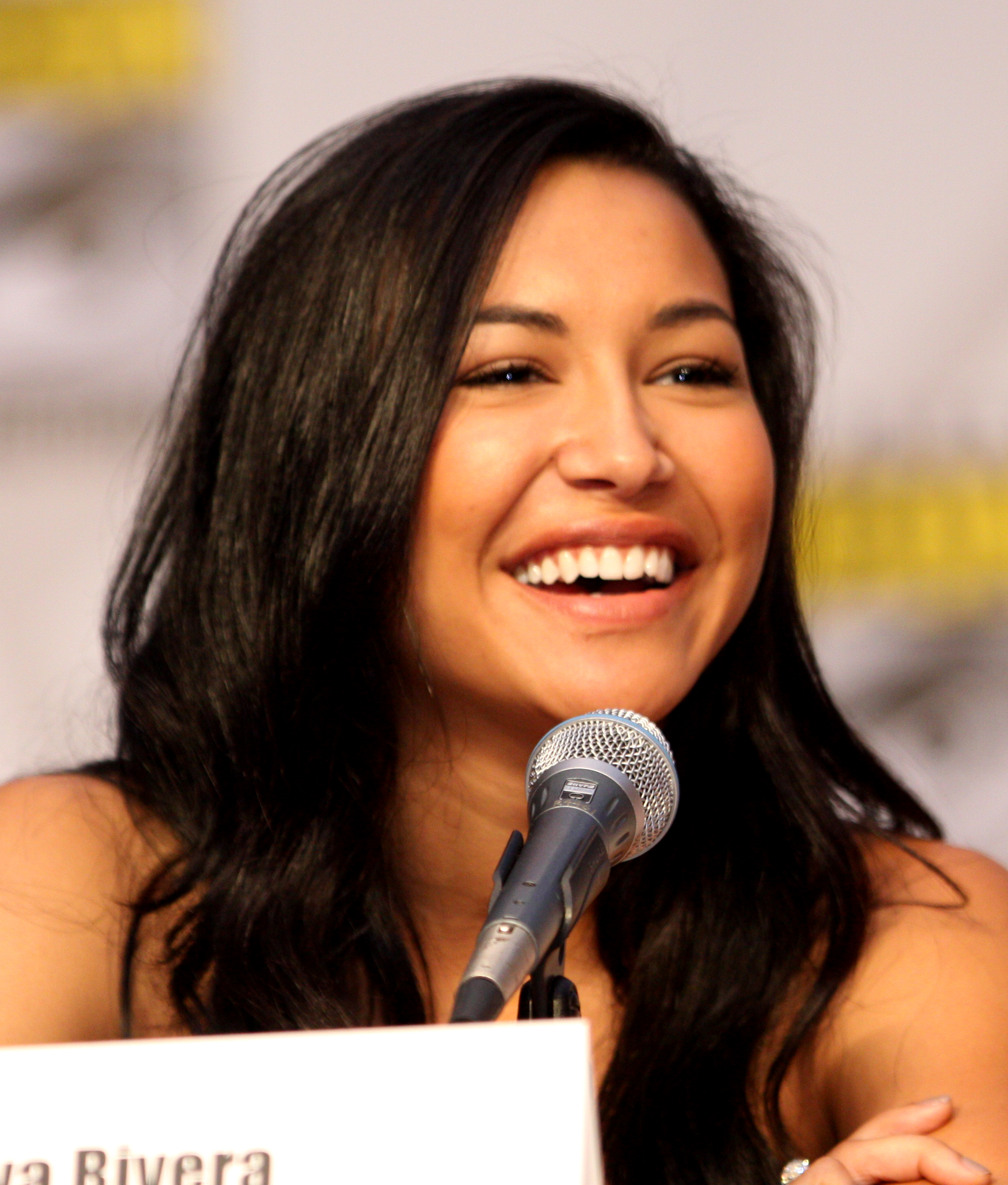
Part One of The Long Halloween was dedicated to Naya Rivera, serving as her final posthumous credit following her death in July 2020.

Appearing in both parts

- Jensen Ackles as Bruce Wayne / Batman
  - Zach Callison as Young Bruce Wayne
- Josh Duhamel as Harvey Dent / Two-Face
- Billy Burke as Captain Gordon
- Naya Rivera as Selina Kyle / Catwoman
- Alastair Duncan as Alfred Pennyworth
- Troy Baker as Joker, Antoni
- David Dastmalchian as Julian Day / Calendar Man, Oswald Cobblepot / Penguin
- Amy Landecker as Barbara Gordon, Carla Viti
- Julie Nathanson as Gilda Dent
- Gary LeRoi Gray as Officer Pearce
- Fred Tatasciore as Solomon Grundy, Large Triad, Vincent Falcone
- Jim Pirri as Sal Maroni, Arkham Guard
- Titus Welliver as Carmine Falcone, Luigi Maroni

Appearing in Part One

- Frances Callier as Nurse Tamara
- Greg Chun as Mickey Chen
- Jack Quaid as Alberto Falcone

Appearing in Part Two

- Laila Berzins as Sofia Falcone
- Alyssa Diaz as Renee Montoya
- John DiMaggio as Jervis Tetch / Mad Hatter
- Robin Atkin Downes as Dr. Jonathan Crane / Scarecrow, Thomas Wayne
- Katee Sackhoff as Dr. Pamela Isley / Poison Ivy
- Rick D. Wasserman as Bodyguard

The Flash and Green Arrow make non-speaking cameo appearances during the second part's post-credit scene.

== Production ==
Batman: The Long Halloween was officially announced in August 2020, during the Superman: Man of Tomorrow panel at DC FanDome.

=== Casting ===
The film's voice cast was revealed in March 2021.

== Release ==
Part One was released on June 22, 2021, on digital download, DVD, and Blu-ray. Part One was originally supposed to launch the new animated continuity that originated in Superman: Man of Tomorrow and Justice Society: World War II, but was delayed due to the release of Matt Reeves' live-action film The Batman, which was originally going to adapt The Long Halloween for its plot. Once Reeves opted to take his film's story in a different direction, Part One was allowed to release earlier.

Part Two was made available for online streaming on July 27, and was released on DVD and Blu-ray on August 10.

The deluxe edition released in September 2022 combined the two parts into one.

== Reception ==
=== Commercial performance ===
Part One earned $659,774 from domestic DVD sales and $2,950,796 from domestic Blu-ray sales, bringing its total domestic home video earnings to $3,610,570. Part Two earned $454,659 from domestic DVD sales and $2,100,180 from domestic Blu-ray sales, bringing its total domestic home video earnings to $2,554,839.

=== Critical reception ===
Batman: The Long Halloween, Part One has garnered positive reviews for its faithful adaptation of the classic graphic novel. Both CBR and MovieWeb praised the film for capturing the tone and style of the original story, translating it into a compelling animated format. IGN Movies highlighted the film's detailed animation and its faithful representation of the noir elements central to the source material. The review praised the suspenseful narrative and complex characters, enhancing the story's depth. The Indian Express viewed the film as a worthwhile watch for Dark Knight enthusiasts, appreciating how it brings the graphic novel's intricate and dark narrative to life. ComicBookMovie praised Jensen Ackles' performance as Batman, describing him as an ideal choice for the role. The review also commended the film's visual style and adherence to the comic book's tone, which contributes to a highly engaging viewing experience.

Batman: The Long Halloween, Part Two continues the narrative from its predecessor. Critics highlighted its exploration of Batman's battle against a series of iconic supervillains and the resolution of the Holiday Killer mystery. ComicBookMovie and IGN both praised the film for its epic resolution and effective wrapping up of key plot points. CBR lauded the dynamic portrayal of DC's villains and strong character development. MovieWeb reviewed the Blu-ray release, and noted the high-quality presentation and valuable special features that enhance the viewing experience.

== Future ==
Ackles reprised his role as Bruce Wayne / Batman in subsequent "Tomorrowverse" animated films including Legion of Super-Heroes (2023), Justice League: Warworld (2023), and the three-part Justice League: Crisis on Infinite Earths (2024). Baker similarly reprised his role as the Joker in the Justice League: Crisis on Infinite Earths.

== See also ==
- List of films set around Halloween
