= Riddler =

Comic book supervillain

- Riddler as he appeared on the cover of Batman: One Bad Day - The Riddler #1 (October 2022). Art by Brian Bolland.

Publication information
- Publisher: DC Comics
- First appearance: Detective Comics #140 (October 1948)
- Created by: Bill Finger (writer); Dick Sprang (artist)

In-story information
- Alter ego: Edward Nigma (later Nygma or Nashton)
- Team affiliations: Legion of Doom; Secret Society of Super Villains; Secret Six; Injustice League
- Notable aliases: E. Nigma; Eddie Nash; Puzzle-Pirate; Prince of Puzzles
- Abilities: Genius-level intellect; Criminal mastermind; Proficient scientist and engineer; Uses complex riddles, puzzles, and lethal contraptions

The Riddler (Edward Nigma, later Edward Nygma or Edward Nashton) is a supervillain appearing in American comic books published by DC Comics. He was created by Bill Finger and Dick Sprang, and debuted in Detective Comics #140 in October 1948. He is one of the most enduring enemies of the superhero Batman and belongs to the collective of adversaries that make up his rogues gallery.

The Riddler is depicted as a criminal mastermind in Gotham City. He has an obsession to incorporate riddles, puzzles, and death traps in his schemes to prove his intellectual superiority over Batman and the police. His real name—Edward Nygma— is a pun itself; an "enigma” is a person or thing that is difficult to understand. With this self-conscious use of an elaborate gimmick, the Riddler's crimes are often theatrical and ostentatious. He commonly wears a domino mask and either a green unitard decorated with question mark prints or a green suit and bowler hat. A black, green, or purple question mark is his visual motif. He commonly says "Riddle me this", before stating his riddles.

The Riddler has been adapted into numerous forms of media, having been portrayed in live action by the following: Frank Gorshin and John Astin on the 1960s television series Batman, Jim Carrey in the 1995 film Batman Forever, Cory Michael Smith on the 2014 Fox series Gotham, and Paul Dano in the 2022 film The Batman. John Glover, Robert Englund, Wally Wingert, and others have provided his voice ranging from animation to video games.

== Fictional character biography ==
=== Golden Age ===
Cover of Detective Comics #140 (October 1948), the first appearance of the Riddler. Art by Win Mortimer.

The character's origin story recounts Edward Nigma's fascination with puzzles from a young age. After a teacher announces that a contest will be held over who can solve a puzzle the fastest, Nigma sets his sights on winning, craving the glory and satisfaction with victory. He breaks into the school at night to practice the puzzle until he is able to solve it in under a minute. Due to this he wins the contest and is given a book of riddles as a prize. His cheating rewarded, Edward embraced the mastery of puzzles of all kinds, eventually becoming a carnival employee who excelled at cheating his customers out of their money with his bizarre puzzles and mind games. He soon finds himself longing for greater challenges and thrills and dons the disguise of the "Riddler" to challenge Batman, believing him to be a worthy adversary. In his first encounter with the Dynamic Duo, Riddler first tried to confound the crime-fighters with his infamous double-entry Riddle Clues and then tried to kill them both in a booby-trapped glass maze on a pier, sealing the door so they could not leave the structure before it exploded, only for Batman and Robin to escape and the Riddler "vanishing" after getting knocked into the sea by the explosion, leaving only his trademark "?" floating in the water.

=== Silver and Bronze Age ===
Riddler's origin is the same as his Golden Age counterpart. The first Silver Age appearance of the Riddler introduced the villain when he was released from prison. Upon release, the Riddler swore he would no longer leave clues to his crimes. However, during his first attempt at a robbery he discovers that leaving clues has become a compulsion.

=== Post-Crisis ===
In Batman: The Long Halloween, the Riddler appears as an informant. The Riddler is hired by Carmine Falcone to tell him the identity of the Holiday Killer. Falcone eventually loses his patience with Riddler and has his daughter throw him out on April 1. Outside Falcone's he is confronted by Holiday who fires several shots at him without harming him due to it being April Fool's, the killer also leaves several items pertaining to their identity at the scene.

In Catwoman: When in Rome, he joins Selina Kyle on a trip to Italy in search of his fellow rogue's origins. It is there that he manipulates her into believing that some of Batman's most dangerous foes are after her. He has his henchmen employ several gimmicks and weapons used by the Scarecrow, Mr. Freeze and the Joker to achieve this. He hopes to extract Batman's real identity from her, but to his dismay, she actually does not know or care.

In the three-part Batman: Legends of the Dark Knight storyline "The Primal Riddle", written by Steve Englehart, the Riddler engineers one of his greatest deathtraps: Batman is thrown into a narrow pit that is slowly filling up with water. The walls are electrically wired, and a set of bumpers are the only thing that prevents the water from touching the walls and causing Batman to die by electrocution. The only options Batman appears to have are death by electrocution and death by drowning, but as always, Batman manages to tamper with the trap's design and develop a route of escape. After Harley Quinn briefly breaks free of her devotion to the Joker, she attempts to hold up a large party at Wayne Manor, only to find that the Riddler is targeting the building also. The two gangs engage in a firefight, but Harley gains the upper hand when Big Barda (who was secretly allied with her at the time) interrupts the conflict and captures the Riddler and his men. During the storyline, Riddler makes constant allusions to a "mystery" that is hidden within the mansion, and after his apprehension, damage done to the building causes the entrance to the Batcave to open. Riddler sees this, and then declares that he has "solved the riddle of Wayne Manor". During this period, he attacks Black Canary and Green Arrow in Star City, and he is easily defeated. This event helps lay the foundations for Riddler's future confrontations with Green Arrow.

=== Batman: Hush ===
In the 12-part storyline Batman: Hush, it is revealed that Riddler has cancer (specifically a brain tumor), which also afflicted the mother of Dr. Thomas Elliot. Riddler uses one of Ra's al Ghul's Lazarus Pits to cure himself and offers Elliot the chance to cure his mother as well, provided he pays a large sum of money. However, Elliott is eager for his mother to die to inherit her fortune. Elliott, who goes on to secretly become the masked criminal Hush, explains he wants to get revenge on his childhood friend Bruce Wayne. The two of them agree to work together and Riddler sets Killer Croc, Poison Ivy, Harley Quinn, Joker, Clayface, and Scarecrow out to destroy Batman, with Ra's al Ghul, Talia al Ghul, and Lady Shiva being temporarily drawn into the scheme as well.

During the psychotic break that follows exposure to the Lazarus Pit, the Riddler deduces Batman's secret identity; he then reveals his knowledge to Hush. He has Clayface shapeshift into Jason Todd to torment Batman, who is haunted by the former Robin's death. Batman first thinks that Riddler had stolen Todd's corpse and hidden it, but it was revealed in a later storyline, Batman: Under the Hood, that Todd was alive and had personally played a role in Riddler and Hush's scheme. When the Riddler threatens to expose Batman's secret identity, Batman mockingly labels it an empty threat.

=== Aftermath ===
As revealed in Batman: Legends of the Dark Knight #185-189, the Riddler became homeless after his encounter with Batman. A chance encounter with an ex-NSA codebreaker gives him a positive environment in which to recover his mind. During that stay, he experiences an induced flashback that leads him to realize that his father had abused him many years ago. Envious of his son's academic achievements in school, and unable to understand his brilliance, his father believed he had cheated on his accomplishments and beat him out of jealousy. Once Riddler discovers this, he is able to understand his lifelong obsession as born out of a traumatic compulsion to prove his intelligence. Having made this connection, the Riddler spends some of his vast fortunes, acquired over many years of crime, to get minor plastic surgery and extensive tattooing, covering most of his torso with his trademark question insignia. He returns and kills the codebreaker – who had pieced together his identity but could not act on it – then promptly steals a priceless scroll out from under Batman's nose. In the years that followed, he largely turned away from crime to instead focus on gaining wealth and social influence.

After orchestrating a brutal series of assaults on Green Arrow, as revenge against his defeat at his hands during the "No Man's Land" era, Riddler gravely injures and almost kills both Green Arrow and Arsenal. He once again escapes before the Outsiders arrive to save them. Sometime between this incident and the events of Hush, Riddler was hired to steal artifacts imbued with mystical powers from one of Star City's museums, and then distract the authorities so that the related rituals could be commenced. He sends Team Arrow on a wild goose chase around the city and then reveals that he has an atomic bomb housed in the stadium where the Star City Rockets play. However, as a side effect of the ritual performed with the artifacts, the city is plunged into complete darkness, and Green Arrow uses this to his advantage, moving in and apprehending the Riddler.

Riddler later shows up in Infinite Crisis #1, with a group of villains attacking the Gotham City Police Department. He is next seen escaping Arkham Asylum during the worldwide supervillain breakout engineered by Alexander Luthor Jr.'s Secret Society of Super Villains days after the prior supernatural disaster. Riddler reappears as part of the Society's attack on Metropolis. He is defeated by Shining Knight and is struck in the head by the Knight's mace.

=== Riddler reformed ===
In Detective Comics #822, the first of a series of issues written by Paul Dini, the Riddler returns, having spent much of the previous year in a coma due to brain damage after being struck in the head by Shining Knight. When he awakes, he is cured of his insanity and of his obsession with riddles, while retaining both his genius intellect and ego. He subsequently reinvents himself as a private detective, taking on the murder case of a wealthy socialite. Hired by the socialite's father, he proves that a photo of Bruce Wayne apparently implicating him in the crime depicts an impostor and briefly works with Batman to investigate the crime. He has suffered severe memory loss from the coma, and he barely remembers his own name. He does not appear to remember that Wayne and Batman are one and the same, although he does harbor some suspicions of once knowing something amazing about Wayne.

The Riddler is a guest along with Bruce Wayne on board a ship during a party. During the party, an old friend of Bruce's falls overboard and is mauled to death by sharks. Riddler appears to solve the case with the suicide of the apparent murderer, and quickly takes the credit. However, Batman finds evidence that suicide was a setup to divert attention away from the real killer. Bruce suspects foul play, and eventually tracks down the killer, whom Riddler is also close to catching before Nigma is bludgeoned over the head by a shark-tooth club. The killer pushes Batman out the window and is about to drop him to his death, when Nigma wraps his tie around an arrow, lights it on fire, and shoots it into the killer's back. As the assailant rolls around screaming, Nigma taunts him, refusing to douse the flames. Batman extinguishes the flame and responds to Nigma's assertion that they are now allies with hostile dismissal.

=== Return to villainy ===
In Tony Daniel's "Life After Death", Riddler appears early in the story at a gala party attended by Arkham, Dick Grayson, Huntress, and Oracle, hired by Penguin to find the Black Mask. As he chases Catgirl away from her robbery of the venue, the Riddler is rocked by a bomb detonation, the trauma re-awakening his psychosis. Cackling, rambling and insane, he terminates his contract with Cobblepot and disappears. In "Riddle Me This", the Riddler still "acts" as a private eye and teams with Batman to solve the murders of a mysterious sorcerer named Sebastian Rothschild (aka Sebastian Blackspell). Blackspell is apprehended, but only after Batman suspects Riddler went to great lengths to orchestrate the ordeal, including poisoning himself with a nearly lethal dose of Joker gas to skirt suspicion and act on a grudge between him and Blackspell.

Riddler's return to villainy is cemented in "Eye of the Beholder". Investigating the Sensei's attack on the Jade Society, Batman (Dick Grayson) is ambushed by Riddler and a young woman introduced as Enigma, Riddler's daughter. Riddler and Enigma escape, delivering the Jade Society member list to Gilda Dent. Riddler is paid but is more interested in another reward, which Gilda promises after one more job. This occurs in "Pieces", where Gilda reveals herself to her estranged husband Harvey, who is now the disfigured criminal Two-Face. She hires Riddler and Enigma to help Two-Face best Mario Falcone and reclaim his coin. The plan works; Riddler and Enigma defeat Batman and reunite the Dents. The Riddler is rewarded with multiple dossiers of himself. When Enigma calls him a has-been, Riddler retorts with a new riddle: "What's green and purple and bleeds profusely?". Enigma's response is cut short by her scream, implying that the Riddler has murdered his own daughter.

=== The New 52 ===
In 2011, "The New 52" rebooted the DC universe. Riddler appears as an inmate at Arkham Asylum in Batman (vol. 2) #1. Redesigned in the style of the new titles, he sports a green mohawk in the shape of a question mark. Riddler appears in more traditional form in the short that concludes Batman #15 "And Here's the Kicker", the third part of "Death of the Family". After it is revealed that Joker has secretly hijacked Arkham Asylum, Riddler is depicted as a current inmate, calmly biding his time and taunting guards. But when Joker appears and reveals his great respect for Riddler (as the villain whose dangerous intellect has kept Batman "sharp"), he uses Joker-gas to force Riddler to prove he could have escaped his cell anytime he wanted. To his chagrin, Riddler does and becomes quite alarmed when Joker shares a write-up of his plan to ambush Batman. Joker admits Riddler will have little part in his designs but should stick around for the "show" anyway.

The Riddler made an appearance in Batman (vol. 2) #21, the opening book of the "Zero Year" arc, where his surname is changed from Edward Nigma to Nashton or Nygma. The Riddler later appears in both the second and third chapters of the "Zero Year" storyline. In the canon, the Riddler is Batman's first masked supervillain and is not only able to best Batman twice, but also takes control of Gotham, causing it to become a flooded wasteland where only the intelligent are meant to survive. Although the Riddler continues to be steps ahead of the Dark Knight, he is eventually defeated by the combined efforts of Batman, Commissioner James Gordon and Lucius Fox. He is later moved to Arkham Asylum.

=== DC Rebirth ===
In 2016, DC Comics implemented a relaunch of its books called "DC Rebirth", which restored its continuity to a form much as it was prior to "The New 52". The Riddler makes his first true appearance in the new DC continuity relaunch in Batman (vol. 3) #19. An inmate of Arkham once again, he rather cooperatively assists Bane in unlocking a high tech door, allowing Bane access to confront Batman.

In the eight-part story arc "The War of Jokes and Riddles", commencing with Batman (vol. 3) #25, flashbacks to a year after the events of "Zero Year" have Batman recounting the details of a war between Riddler and Joker. He is first seen in custody at the GCPD, assisting them in solving a variety of crimes, including locating Joker's whereabouts, before stabbing a police officer to death 26 times. Blackmailing the approaching guards with details of their children and families, Riddler walks out freely before intruding into Joker's office. Riddler seemingly offers the Joker a partnership, acknowledging that if either of the two men individually kills Batman, the other will be left forever unsatisfied. However the Joker shoots Riddler in the stomach and quickly departs, Batman appearing through the window and giving chase. Left in a pool of his own blood, Riddler rose to his feet and limped out of the office, seemingly unfazed. Edward quickly healed from the wound, carving a question marked shaped scar over the wound, before murdering Dr. Jaime Knowles. Riddler is then seen meeting with Poison Ivy, discussing the Joker's need to rid anyone who could potentially kill Batman before him. The duo is then ambushed by gunmen working for Carmine Falcone under the orders of the Joker to kill Riddler within the hour. However, Ivy attacks the gunmen with her vines, allowing Edward and herself to leave.

Waging war on Joker's team across Gotham, Riddler is responsible for poisoning Charles Brown's son, resulting in his transformation into Kite Man. The war continues, with Riddler and Joker claiming territories across Gotham, before Riddler, who had convinced Batman to side with him during the conflict, blackmails and interrogates Kite Man into giving up Joker's location. However Batman, after a brief fight between him, Riddler and Joker, becomes disgusted by Riddler's actions and quickly grabs a blade, breaking his one rule of no killing to stab Riddler. However, Joker, who finally begins to laugh again, prevents Batman from doing so.

=== Infinite Frontier ===
Riddler features in the Infinite Frontier one-shot Batman - One Bad Day: The Riddler, wherein he is given a revised origin. Here he is named Edward Tierney, a child prodigy with a genius level intellect who attends a prestigious private college where his father is the headmaster. Edward is a socially awkward child seemingly without social contacts besides his father, who pushes him extremely harshly in his studies. He also regularly beats and humiliates Edward due to him being the shameful result of a short lived affair with a prostitute. When Edward fails to get a full score on a test that ends with an unrelated riddle, he is beaten and humiliated even more. Edward attempts suicide, though after surviving sneaks into the school archives and steals the test key for the upcoming course. The teacher finds out and is set to expel Edward from the school. He notes that getting expelled might actually be good for Edward, as he'll still be brilliant but will also have experienced failure and might become a bit more relaxed. Hearing this, Edward snaps and beats the teacher to death. This sets Edward on the way to adopting the "Nygma" surname and becoming the Riddler.

== Characterization ==
=== Skills and abilities ===
The Riddler is a criminal genius capable of extraordinary lateral thinking in decoding and formulating puzzles of all kinds. As a private detective during the time he was reformed, he demonstrated investigative skills that rival those of the Dark Knight. However, Batman's observations note that "[Nigma] exhibits personality disorders consistent with a fanatic narcissist, egocentrism, and megalomania crossed with severe obsessive compulsion".

Like most of Batman's enemies (and Batman himself), the Riddler has no superhuman abilities but is a highly cunning criminal strategist. He is not especially talented in fisticuffs (although his endurance has grown from having to engage in it over the years), but sometimes employs weaponry that exploits his gimmick, such as exploding jigsaw pieces, question-mark-shaped pistols, and his infamous question-mark staff, known to house a wide variety of technological devices and weapons. Still, his theme is flexible to his crimes, compared to similar criminals: all the Riddler requires is to be able to describe his threatened crime with a riddle or puzzle. Riddler once tried to commit crimes without leaving any clues using self hypnosis; however, he learned too late that while he was asleep his unconscious mind left riddling clues, causing Batman and Robin to capture him. He is shown to be skilled with engineering and technology, having confronted Batman and Robin with unique and elaborate deathtraps. He is also well known for being Batman's most intelligent adversary and in turn, has a grudging respect for Batman, in that he is the only adversary that has an intellectual genius equal to the Riddler.

However, the threat that Riddler actually poses is somewhat inconsistent across his various stories. His most formidable depictions emphasize his intelligence and cunning, portraying him as one of few rogues capable of seriously taxing Batman's mental prowess, while also willing to take the precaution of obtaining firearms to deal with the superhero. Some recent depictions, however, have placed a derogatory focus on his flamboyant gimmickry and relative lack of major victories (even despite this applying to most of Batman's enemies), portraying him as petty, overconfident, relatively harmless, and held in low esteem. The latter approach has proved polarizing, with some fans finding it wasteful in light of the character's classic status and history of compelling stories, while others argue that most of his popularity has come from media other than his comic storylines and enjoy the notion of knowing that his "real" threat level is overrated. Since The New 52 reboot, Riddler has been consistently depicted as a serious threat, with notable successes.

=== Relationships ===
==== Cluemaster ====
The Riddler develops a working relationship with the Cluemaster, although he initially resents the villain for seemingly copying his modus operandi. In their first encounter, he sets his fellow rogue up with a bomb and sends Batman off chasing riddles that would lead to its defusing, as well as away from his real plan: to steal a vast amount of priceless baseball merchandise. The two team up on a few occasions afterward and work together on a big scheme shortly before Cluemaster's apparent death in the pages of The Suicide Squad.

==== Query and Echo ====
The Riddler once had two henchwomen named Query and Echo (real names Diedre Vance and Nina Damfino respectively) who first appeared in Detective Comics Annual Issue #8, July 1995. Once employees of an underground club called Pandora's Box, became a duo biker gang robbing small convenience stores. One night, as they were attempting to rob another store, they forced a customer at gunpoint to surrender the goods, not knowing it was the Riddler who was about to start his criminal career. Seeing their potential, he hired the bikers and ultimately became Query and Echo (although some iterations include Quiz and Query).

Aside from their matching outfits (mostly unitards with fishnet leggings) and non-distinctive personalities, they differ in hair color and skin tone. Query has lighter skin, long blonde hair, and often wears what looks like a police cap. Echo has darker skin and short black hair. They exhibit great agility and combat skills. After several issues, Query and Echo have since made little appearances and brief mentions in both the comics and other mediums.

== Other versions ==
Edward as he appears in Joker.

Many alternate universe versions of Riddler have appeared throughout the character's publication history.

- In Joker, Riddler has a circle of question marks tattooed on his abdomen and uses his cane to support himself due to a disabled leg.
- In Thrillkiller, Riddler is a psychiatrist who counsels Barbara Gordon.
- In Batman: Earth One, Riddler is a nameless serial killer who puts people in life-threatening situations while challenging them with riddles before killing them regardless of whether they answer correctly or not. Additionally, he is obsessed with learning Batman's secret identity, which he considers the "ultimate riddle".
- In Justice, Riddler was beaten by his father whenever he lied, to the point where he became psychologically incapable of doing so as an adult.
- On Earth-Three, the Quizmaster is a heroic counterpart of the Riddler and a member of Justice Underground.
- In Dark Knights of Steel, Riddler is an orphan who resided at Arkham Orphanage before going on to join the King's Bane's Secret Six and adopt a Robin Hood-esque outfit with embroidered question marks and a fiddle with a question mark shaped handle as an adult.
- In Absolute Batman, Edward Nygma is a childhood friend of Bruce Wayne and a tech genius who, following an attack by Bane, suffered severe brain damage that caused him to see facts as questions and rebuilt his skull using parts of an android he built.

== See also ==
- List of Batman family enemies
- Enigma (DC Comics)
- Batman rapist – An unidentified English serial rapist nicknamed "The Riddler"
