= Mario Falcone (DC Comics) =

Publication information
- Publisher: DC Comics
- First appearance: Batman: Dark Victory #1 (December 1999)
- Created by: Jeph Loeb; Tim Sale

In-story information
- Full name: Mario Falcone
- Species: Human
- Team affiliations: Falcone family
- Notable aliases: Mario Calvi

Mario Falcone is a fictional character appearing in American comic books published by DC Comics. He is the son of Gotham City mob boss Carmine Falcone, the brother of Alberto Falcone and Sofia Falcone, and the uncle of Kitrina Falcone.

Mario Falcone appears in the third season of Gotham, portrayed by James Carpinello. The character also appeared in the third season of the Arrowverse series Batwoman, portrayed by Marcio Barauna.

== Publication history ==
Mario Falcone first appeared in Batman: Dark Victory #1 and was created by Jeph Loeb and Tim Sale.

== Fictional character biography ==
After Carmine Falcone is murdered by Two-Face, Mario and Sofia visit their father's grave, giving him a posthumous birthday party with their cousin Lucia Viti, Selina Kyle, and other high-profile Mafiosi in attendance. Batman surveils the party from a rooftop until a gangster takes notice and attacks him. Catwoman helps Batman take the thugs down. By the time Lieutenant James Gordon and the police arrive, Mario and the rest of the Falcone family have already fled. Later on at Wayne Manor, Mario visits Bruce Wayne and proposes a business alliance between the Falcone family and Wayne Enterprises. Bruce declines, earning Mario's displeasure.

Sal Maroni's family begins robbing Falcone Imports with help from Viti and small-time smuggler Tony Zucco. Mario tells Sofia that her assets are being frozen and threatens to disown her if she cannot put a stop to the robberies. After Sofia's departure, Mario speaks with an unknown figure who states that she will now go to the only place that would take her in. When Mario states that he does not want his name associated with the contact, the unknown figure states that nobody is interested in him.

On Mother's Day, Mario meets with Gotham City's bankers and Bruce Wayne, but the meeting is interrupted when the Joker attacks them. The Joker then kidnaps Mario and his siblings and holds them hostage at Gotham City Police Department headquarters. Batman saves the Falcone siblings and hands them over to the police, but the trial judge secures their release.

On Columbus Day, Two-Face's gang attacks and kills most of the Falcone gang, leaving only Mario, Alberto, and Sofia alive. Mario speaks with Gordon and officer Julia Lopez, giving him information regarding Sofia in exchange for protection. The Hangman Killer later kills Alberto, leaving Mario the sole living immediate member of the Falcone family. Alone and despondent, Mario destroys the Falcone family mansion.

During a fight with Robin, Mario threatens to kill Two-Face's estranged wife Gilda. Two-Face shoots and kills him in defense.

== In other media ==
- Mario Calvi appears in the third season of Gotham, portrayed by James Carpinello. This version is a doctor who forsook the Falcone family name and instead uses his mother's maiden name, Calvi.
- Mario Falcone appears in the Batwoman episode "We're All Mad Here", portrayed by Marcio Barauna. This version is a member of Black Glove who is later killed by Marquis Jet.
