= Alberto Falcone =

- Alberto Falcone as seen in Batman: The Long Halloween #13 (December 1997).

Publication information
- Publisher: DC Comics
- First appearance: Batman: The Long Halloween #1 (October 1996)
- Created by: Jeph Loeb (writer); Tim Sale (artist)

In-story information
- Full name: Alberto Falcone
- Species: Human
- Notable aliases: The Holiday Killer
- Abilities: Skilled marksmanship

Alberto Falcone is a fictional comic book villain appearing in books published by DC Comics, in particular the Batman books. In addition to being a mobster, he is the Holiday Killer, a serial killer featured in Batman: The Long Halloween and Batman: Dark Victory.

Luke Brandon Field portrayed Al Falcone in the DC Extended Universe film The Flash. The character also appeared in the HBO television miniseries The Penguin (2024) set in The Batman shared universe, portrayed by Michael Zegen.

== Publication history ==
Alberto Falcone first appeared in Batman: The Long Halloween #1 and was created by Jeph Loeb and Tim Sale.

== Fictional character biography ==
Born as the middle child of Gotham City crime lord Carmine Falcone on February 14, Alberto earned a scholarship to Harvard University and received post-graduate education at Oxford. As a young man, he is eager to follow in his father's footsteps as a crime boss, but Carmine rebuffed his son's efforts; it is suggested that Carmine simply wants him to have a normal life but does not know how to express those feelings. Alberto is nevertheless hurt and angered by the perceived slight, and grows pathologically jealous of his siblings, Mario and Sofia, as they are allowed to take part in the "family business".

Throughout Batman: The Long Halloween, various Gotham City criminals are murdered by the Holiday Killer, a killer known for striking on holidays, killing with his signature weapon, a .22 pistol, and leaving small holiday-themed objects at the scene of the crime. At first, the murdered criminals are connected to Carmine Falcone, starting with the death of his nephew, Johnny Viti. On New Year's Eve, Alberto Falcone is apparently killed by Holiday during a party on Falcone's yacht.

On Labor Day, while Sal Maroni is being transported to a safer area after disfiguring Harvey Dent in court, Alberto Falcone appears and kills him with two shots to the head. Alberto is arrested by Jim Gordon after Batman beats him so badly he loses feeling in one arm. Alberto later admits to committing all of the Holiday murders, including that of his cousin Johnny Viti. Although Alberto initially receives the death sentence, his unstable mental state allows him to instead plead insanity. He is imprisoned in Arkham Asylum instead.

Despite the warnings of Commissioner Gordon, Alberto is released from Arkham with the help of Janice Porter, Dent's replacement as Gotham's district attorney; Porter argues that Alberto has been deemed 'cured' and that he was the victim of various civil rights violations during his arrest due to the brutal beating he received from Batman, to the extent that his right arm is still disfigured. He is placed under house arrest at the Falcone compound outside Gotham, with a tracer is attached to his leg to prevent escape. On Carmine Falcone's birthday, Alberto attempts to kill Sofia to usurp powers of the five crime families, but relents.

Following Janice Porter's death, Two-Face has her body left in Alberto's bed to trick him into thinking he had killed her. This time Scarecrow uses his fear toxins to make Alberto hallucinate that his father's voice is commanding him to commit suicide. Alberto then knows that the voice is not real — his father did not believe in suicide — and he exposes Calendar Man. Sofia takes her wounded brother to a hiding place in the Falcone mausoleum. There, Sofia criticizes Alberto for complaining about the pain, recalling how Carmine had survived five shots to the chest. Alberto replies that he is not his father. Sofia, disgusted, agrees with this assessment and kills him.

== Powers and abilities ==
Alberto Falcone is a skilled marksman.

== In other media ==
=== Television ===
Alberto Falcone appears in The Penguin, portrayed by Michael Zegen. Following his father Carmine's assassination, the drug-addicted Alberto becomes heir-apparent to his criminal empire. Alberto later reveals to Oswald "Oz" Cobb his fear of not being able to live up to his father's reputation. Oz attempts to assure him, but Alberto later mocks him while in a drunken stupor, leading to Oz impulsively killing him.

=== Film ===
- Alberto Falcone appears in Batman: The Long Halloween, voiced by Jack Quaid. This version was married to Gilda Dent before she married Harvey Dent, which his father disapproved of.
- Alberto Falcone appears in The Flash, portrayed by Luke Brandon Field. This version is a terrorist.

=== Video games ===
- Alberto Falcone appears in Batman: Arkham Origins, voiced by Quinton Flynn.
- Alberto Falcone appears as a character summon in Scribblenauts Unmasked: A DC Comics Adventure.

== See also ==
- List of Batman family enemies
