= Gilda Dent =

- Interior artwork from Batman #712 (July 2011), art by Andy Smith.

Publication information
- Publisher: DC Comics
- First appearance: As Gilda Dent: Detective Comics #66 (August 1942); As Holiday: Batman: The Long Halloween #1 (December 1996)
- Created by: Gilda Dent: Bill Finger (writer); Bob Kane (artist); Holiday: Jeph Loeb (writer); Tim Sale (artist)

In-story information
- Full name: Gilda Gold, sometimes "Grace"
- Species: Human
- Partnerships: Two-Face
- Notable aliases: Holiday

Gilda Dent (née Gold), occasionally referred to as Grace, is a fictional character who has appeared in Batman comic books since Detective Comics #66 (August 1942). Associated with her fiancé (later husband) Harvey Dent, who becomes the criminal mastermind Two-Face, she has since been a recurring character throughout various Batman stories involving him. Her largest role is in the Jeph Loeb and Tim Sale collaboration Batman: The Long Halloween, where she became the criminal known as Holiday, a serial killer who killed members of Gotham City's crime families in correlation with holidays in the yearly calendar.

Julie Nathanson voices Gilda in the animated film adaptation of Batman: The Long Halloween.

== Fictional character biography ==
=== Pre-Crisis ===
In her first appearance, Gilda Gold is the fiancée of Harvey Kent (later renamed Dent), the district attorney of Gotham City. Gangster Boss Maroni throws acid in Harvey's face during Maroni's trial, scarring half of his face and warping his mind. Because Gilda is a sculptor, Harvey believes that she worships beauty; therefore (in Dent's mind), neither she—nor anyone else—could ever love or accept a person with such a monstrously "hideous" face as his. Gilda creates a bust of Harvey, which he smashes with a mallet to symbolize his new, ruined self. Even as Two-Face begins a dual career of crime and Robin Hood-style philanthropy, he and Gilda still long for each other.

Gilda is in the audience when Two-Face and his gang try to rob a classical concert. Gilda follows Two-Face to his hideout as Batman and Robin burst in. When Two-Face, having the drop on Batman, pulls his gun and opens fire upon his former ally, Gilda leaps in front of the bullet. Pleading to Harvey that she had to make him "understand… before it was too late…", she passes out, shocking Two-Face into thinking he has killed her. Two-Face turns himself in as Gilda is hospitalized.

When Two-Face learns from the doctors that Gilda has lost the will to live, he vows to give up his life of crime. After a final tussle with the last of his men, he undergoes plastic surgery and is released from jail after one year. His face and sanity restored, Harvey Kent promises to finally marry Gilda.

=== Earth-One ===
Gilda did not return to comics again until the late 1970s in Teen Titans #48 (June 1977), where Duela Dent claims to be her daughter, conceived apparently during the brief period seen in Batman #234 where Harvey Dent was cured.

In Batman #328, it is revealed that Gilda remarried Dave Stevens, Harvey Dent's former assistant. Stevens is murdered by Maroni, who is subsequently killed by Two-Face as revenge for causing Gilda pain. Two-Face disguises himself as a man named Carl Ternison and courts the newly widowed Gilda, trying to have a normal life with her.

When Gilda discovers the truth, Two-Face's madness escalates, and he eventually traps Batman inside an abandoned courthouse. However, before he can pull the trigger, Gilda intercedes, swearing that if he kills Batman, she will think of him only as a murderer and never forgive him. She gives him an ultimatum: "Will it be vengeance or hope?" Torn apart, Two-Face breaks down and begs her for help. He is arrested, but Gilda promises to be there for him as long as he wants to get better.

=== Post-Crisis ===
Gilda does not reappear until Secret Origins Special #1, where she (renamed Grace) appears on a TV talk show focusing on Gotham's villains. She talks about a time when one of the criminals Dent put away as D.A. returned for revenge by taking her hostage. Two-Face eventually rescued her, beating the ex-con to the point of death, but holding off because Grace demanded he stop. This represents a rare case where Two-Face is not influenced by the coin, but rather by someone else's welfare. She tries once again to appeal to his "good" side, but fails. At the end of the interview, she professes her belief that, one day, Dent would return to her.

Her role in Harvey Dent's past was explored in Dent's reimagined origin story in Batman Annual #14 (1990). In this story, it is revealed that Dent's father was an abusive alcoholic who used a coin flip to decide whether he would beat his son. Dent spends a lifetime burying his rage and resentment, only to discover that the coin was two-headed all along. While Dent is torn between loving and resenting his father, Gilda clearly despises him.

Gilda returns in Batman: Two-Face Strikes Twice. Here, she finds herself at odds with her now-ex-husband, as he believes their marriage failed because he was unable to give her children. She later marries Paul Janus, a reference to Janus - a two-faced Roman god. Two-Face attempts to frame Janus as a criminal by kidnapping him and replacing him with a stand-in, whom Two-Face "disfigures" with makeup to make it look as if Janus has gone insane just as Two-Face had. Two-Face is eventually caught by Batman and sent away, and Gilda and Janus reunite. Years later, Gilda gives birth to twins named James and Luke, prompting Two-Face to escape once more and take the twins hostage, as he erroneously believes them to be conceived by Janus using an experimental fertility drug. Batman learns from Gilda that Janus is not the father of Gilda's twins - Dent is. Some of his sperm had been frozen after a death threat had been made against him, and she used some of it to get pregnant. Batman uses this information to convince Dent to free the twins and turn himself in.

=== Post-Zero Hour ===
Gilda Dent destroying incriminating evidence against her husband Harvey Dent in Batman: The Long Halloween, art by Tim Sale.

After the events of Zero Hour: Crisis in Time!, Gilda's entire history was revised. She has a larger role and story arc in The Long Halloween, a maxi-series that is part of Two-Face's origin in Batman Annual #14. During the nearly year-long story, a serial killer called Holiday systematically murders prominent gangsters. During the series, Gilda's marriage to Dent shows signs of strain; she wants to settle down and start a family, while he is obsessed with capturing Holiday. In a private monologue at the end, Gilda states that she was the original Holiday killer, having committed all of the murders up until New Year's Eve. Gilda indicates that Dent murdered Alberto Falcone on New Year's Eve, taking her place, and that he was the one responsible for the crimes from that point on. The confession is only known to readers, since Alberto confessed to all the Holiday murders upon his capture. Gilda destroys the evidence of her crimes and leaves Gotham City.

=== Post-Infinite Crisis ===
During Dick Grayson's tenure as Batman, Gilda appears standing over a wounded Harvey Dent. The Riddler reveals that she faked her death and was institutionalized following The Long Halloween. There, she met Mario Falcone, who suffered a similar breakdown. After getting involved upon their release, Falcone kept Gilda like a prisoner, and she conspired with the Riddler to steal Two-Face's coin and entice him to rescue her. Knowing that Falcone was on Dent's tail, Gilda faked Harvey's death by appearing to shoot him at point-blank range. When they were finally reunited, she explained how much she missed him, and that she now believed in Two-Face as well as Harvey Dent. Feeling betrayed and manipulated, Two-Face tried to kill Gilda, but hesitates, only to be stopped by Batman. To save Harvey, Gilda shoots Batman with a .22, knocking him out and allowing them both to escape.

=== New 52 ===
In The New 52 reboot, Gilda is a socialite who Bruce Wayne introduces to Harvey at a graduation party. She is killed in front of Harvey by Erin McKillen.

== Other versions ==
=== Flashpoint ===
An alternate timeline version of Gilda Dent, referred to simply as Mrs. Dent, makes a minor appearance in Flashpoint, where she is married to Harvey, who is a prominent judge in Gotham, and has two children with him named Dexter and Debbie. Their children are kidnapped by the Joker and later rescued by Batman.

In Flashpoint Beyond, in which the universe continues in a snow globe after the Flash resets the main timeline, Gilda was driven insane from the trauma she endured and murdered Debbie, with Harvey committing her to Arkham Asylum and claiming Debbie died from suicide. When Batman confronts her while investigating the Clockwork Killer, she smashes her face into her shattered cell window and becomes this timeline's version of Two-Face. It's revealed that she was working with Joker, who murdered Harvey as the Clockwork Killer, to help her acquire a time machine that Thomas and Martha could use to go back in time and prevent Bruce's death, which she agreed to after learning Harvey's supposed to be Two-Face instead of her.

After realizing her son Dexter would cease to exist if they time-traveled and they would be no different than the man who killed Bruce, Thomas destroys the machine. Martha kills Gilda when she attempts to kill Thomas and Dexter. Dexter ends up becoming his universe's Robin.

== In other media ==
=== Television ===
A character analogous to Gilda Dent named Grace Lamont appears in the Batman: The Animated Series two-part episode "Two-Face", voiced by Murphy Cross. She is engaged to marry Harvey Dent until he is disfigured while fighting Rupert Thorne and becomes Two-Face.

=== Film ===
- An alternate universe version of Gilda Dent makes a cameo appearance in Batman: Gotham by Gaslight.
- Gilda Dent appears in Batman: The Long Halloween, voiced by Julie Nathanson. This version was previously engaged to marry Alberto Falcone and was pregnant with his son before he called off the marriage and forced her to get an abortion. Motivated by her anger towards him and his family, Gilda takes the fall for the Holiday Killer's crimes.
- Gilda Dent will appear in The Batman: Part II, portrayed by Scarlett Johansson.

=== Miscellaneous ===
Grace Lamont appears in The Batman and Robin Adventures.
