= Carmine Falcone =

Fictional DC Comics character

- Carmine Falcone as depicted in Batman Eternal #2 (June 2014). Art by Jason Fabok.

Publication information
- Publisher: DC Comics
- First appearance: Batman #405 (March, 1987)
- Created by: Frank Miller (writer); David Mazzucchelli (artist)

In-story information
- Full name: Carmine Falcone
- Species: Human
- Place of origin: Gotham City
- Team affiliations: Falcone Crime Family
- Notable aliases: The Roman; Don Falcone
- Abilities: Criminal mastermind Expert marksman

Carmine Falcone is a supervillain appearing in American comic books published by DC Comics, portrayed as a powerful Italian-American mob boss, an enemy of Batman, and an acquaintance of the Wayne family. He has also been sometimes depicted as the illegitimate father of Catwoman.

In live-action, the character has been portrayed in film by Tom Wilkinson in Batman Begins (2005) and in television by John Doman in Gotham (2014–2017). In The Batman shared universe, Falcone has been portrayed by John Turturro in the film The Batman (2022) and Mark Strong in The Penguin miniseries (2024).

== Publication history ==
Carmine Falcone debuted in the four-part story Batman: Year One written by Frank Miller and David Mazzucchelli in 1987. In the comics, Falcone is a powerful Mafia chieftain nicknamed "The Roman", where his stranglehold over Gotham City's organized crime is referenced as "The Roman Empire" at least once. In Year One, his penthouse is designed in a Roman architectural style.

The character is based on Marlon Brando's portrayal of Don Vito Corleone from the film The Godfather (1972). Jeph Loeb, writer of Batman: The Long Halloween, stated in an interview that he paralleled the Falcone family to that of the Corleone family: Falcone's power and wisdom akin to Vito Corleone, his son Alberto's personality and appearance that of Fredo Corleone, and his daughter Sofia's temper matching that of Sonny Corleone. Lastly, his elder son Mario's deportation to Sicily, physical appearance, and desire to legitimize the Falcone family are all traits shared with Michael Corleone.

== Fictional character biography ==
In a flashback in The Long Halloween, gangster Vincent Falcone brings his badly wounded son, Carmine, who had been shot several times by his rival Luigi Maroni, to Thomas Wayne. Fearing Maroni would finish the job at a public hospital, he begs Wayne, one of the city's best doctors, to perform surgery at Wayne Manor. A young Bruce Wayne watches his father save Falcone's life. Years later at Thomas and Martha Wayne's funeral, Carmine Falcone, now part of his father's crime family, tells Bruce that he can always ask a favor of him should he need it.

In Batman: Year One, Falcone is shown to be the most powerful figure in Gotham City, with the mayor, city council, and much of Gotham's police force in his pocket and all of the city's criminal outfits under his control. His power comes under attack with the arrival of the mysterious vigilante Batman. Despite GCPD Commissioner Gillian B. Loeb's desperate attempts to stop him, Batman's attacks on Falcone's crime family become even more brazen and Falcone decides to have Batman killed. Batman further embarrasses Falcone by rescuing Catwoman when the mobster and his henchmen catch her trying to rob them. In the process, Catwoman leaves Falcone permanently scarred when she scratches him with the metal claws of her costume.

Falcone orders his nephew Johnny Viti to kidnap the family of Detective Jim Gordon, but the attempt is foiled. When Gordon and District Attorney Harvey Dent's investigations start threatening his power, Falcone orders an unsuccessful hit on Viti out of fear that he might talk. The failed hit results in the Falcone family getting embroiled in a mob war with Viti's boss Carla in Chicago, which serves only to further diminish Falcone's influence in Gotham.

During The Long Halloween, the weakened Falcone family is targeted by the serial killer Holiday, who targets and kills at least one member of the Falcone crime family each month on a holiday. When Batman and Dent burn his hoard of stolen cash, Falcone strikes back by hiring Mad Hatter, Poison Ivy, Riddler, and Scarecrow who become Batman's rogues gallery. Convinced that Dent is secretly Holiday, Falcone persuades his former rival Sal Maroni to kill Dent while standing trial for murder. Falcone arranges for Maroni to obtain a vial of acid, which he hurls at Dent during a court proceeding. The acid disfigures the left side of Dent's face, leading to his becoming Two-Face. Two-Face kills Falcone following a coin flip that lands on the scarred side. Falcone's son Alberto, presumed to have been the victim of the killer, confesses that he committed the Holiday killings in an attempt to be accepted into the family business.

=== The New 52 ===
In 2011, "The New 52" rebooted the DC universe. Carmine Falcone appears in Batman Eternal as a former mobster determined to reclaim his empire after Commissioner Gordon is framed for mass murder. Falcone is unaware of the larger plot against Batman, and was informed that he would have a chance to strike by an anonymous letter sent to him by the true mastermind.

Carmine Falcone is later involved in a gang war with the Penguin, which leads to both of them being arrested. Falcone is incarcerated at Blackgate Penitentiary and later extradited to Hong Kong.

=== DC Rebirth ===
In 2016, DC Comics implemented a relaunch of its books called "DC Rebirth", which restored its continuity to a form much as it was prior to The New 52. In the "War of Jokes and Riddles" storyline, Joker contacts Carmine Falcone and instructs him to kill Riddler within an hour. His men fail to complete the assignment, leading Joker to kill Falcone's men. Penguin then takes over Carmine's business interests on Joker's behalf.

== Family ==
The following are relatives of Carmine Falcone:

- Vincent Falcone – Carmine's father and the founder of the Falcone crime family.
- Carla Viti – Carmine's sister and the boss of the Viti crime family in Chicago.
- Louisa Falcone – Carmine's wife and mother of his three children. Her current whereabouts are unknown.
- Johnny Viti – Carla's son and Carmine's nephew. Part of the Viti family in Chicago.
- Lucia Viti – Carla's daughter and Carmine's niece.
- Sofia Falcone – Carmine's daughter who takes over as boss of the Falcone family. Mario later legally changes his sister's name to Sofia Gigante to cleanse the family name of her crimes.
- Alberto Falcone – Carmine's inept son, who is desperate to be accepted into the family.
- Mario Falcone – Carmine's son and a successful businessman who seeks to legitimize the Falcone family, even if it means turning on his siblings.
- Selina Kyle – Carmine's alleged daughter.
- Kitrina Falcone – Carmine's estranged granddaughter and a skilled escape artist who becomes Catwoman's sidekick and apprentice.
- Luca Falcone - Carmine's cousin. Killed by the Red Hood Gang.

== In other media ==
=== Television ===
John Doman as Carmine Falcone in Gotham.

- Carmine Falcone appears in Gotham, portrayed by John Doman. This version is a veteran mafia don. In the first season finale, "All Happy Families Are Alike", Falcone is wounded by Sal Maroni's men. After a battle with Maroni and Fish Mooney, he retires his criminal career and leaves Gotham. In the fourth season, Falcone returns to Gotham due to a gang war erupting in the city and is killed by assassins hired by his daughter Sofia.
- Carmine Falcone appears in the Justice League Action episode "Time Share", voiced by Jason J. Lewis.
- A young Carmine Falcone appears in flashbacks depicted in The Penguin, portrayed by Mark Strong.

=== Film ===
Tom Wilkinson as Falcone in Batman Begins (left). John Turturro as Falcone in The Batman (right).
- Carmine Falcone appears in Batman Begins, portrayed by Tom Wilkinson. Years prior, Falcone has Joe Chill murdered to stop him from testifying in court, ruining Bruce Wayne's attempt at revenge. Bruce then confronts Falcone, who threatens and taunts him, inspiring Bruce to eventually create the mantle of Batman in his search to effectively fight Gotham's criminals. In the present, Falcone works with Jonathan Crane and Ra's al Ghul. After being apprehended by Batman, Falcone feigns madness to meet with Crane and tries to blackmail him, only to be driven insane with fear gas and interned at Arkham Asylum.
- Carmine Falcone appears in Batman: Year One, voiced by Alex Rocco.
- Carmine Falcone appears in Lego DC Shazam! Magic and Monsters, voiced by Troy Baker.
- Carmine Falcone appears in Batman: The Long Halloween, voiced by Titus Welliver.
- Carmine Falcone appears in The Batman, portrayed by John Turturro. Similarly to the Batman: The Long Halloween depiction, this version was shot after he was saved by Thomas Wayne years prior and has an illegitimate daughter Selina Kyle whom he attempts to kill. Batman saves Selina and hands Falcone over to the police, but Riddler snipes Falcone as he is being taken into custody.

=== Video games ===
- Carmine Falcone appears in Batman Begins, voiced by Tom Wilkinson.
- Carmine Falcone appears as a character summon in Scribblenauts Unmasked: A DC Comics Adventure.
- Carmine Falcone appears in Batman: Arkham Underworld, voiced by Jon Polito.
- Carmine Falcone appears in Batman: The Telltale Series, voiced by Richard McGonagle. This version is an associate of Mayor Hamilton Hill and Thomas and Martha Wayne who takes control of Gotham's criminal underworld after the Waynes are murdered. After being defeated by Batman and being visited by Bruce in the hospital, Falcone is murdered by a brainwashed Renee Montoya.
- Carmine Falcone appears in Batman: Arkham Shadow, voiced by Darin De Paul.
- Carmine Falcone, with elements of the Batman Begins and The Batman incarnations of the character, appears in Lego Batman: Legacy of the Dark Knight, voiced by Ewan Bailey.

== See also ==
- List of Batman family enemies
- Batman and the Monster Men
- Sal Maroni - A rival crime lord.
