= Julie Nathanson =

American actress

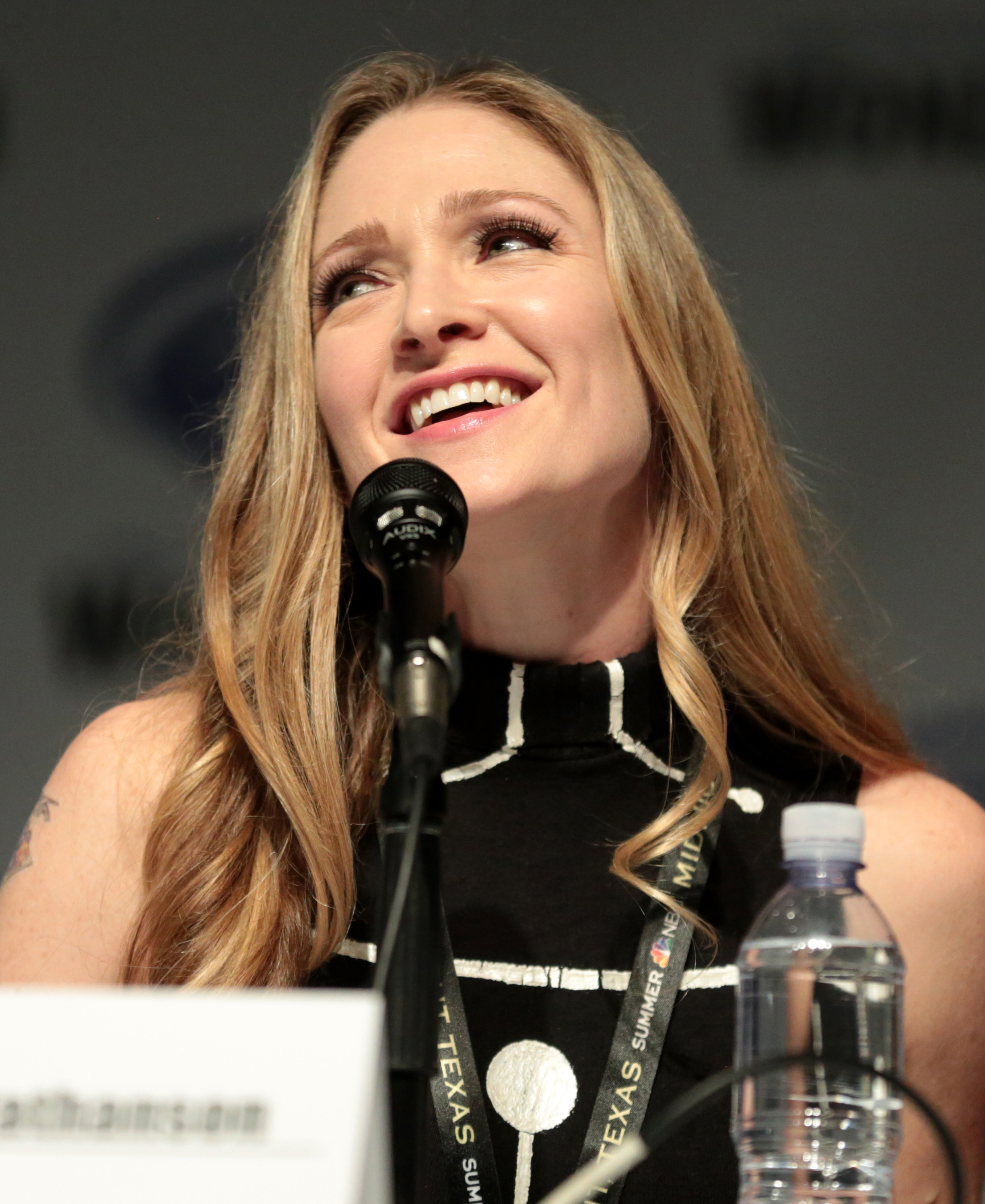
- Nathanson at the 2017 WonderCon
- Born: 1972 or 1973 (age 52–53)
- Education: Friends Central School; Tufts University
- Occupation: Actress
- Years active: 1996–present

Julie Nathanson (born 1972 or 1973) is an American actress known for voicing Rosalie Rowan in The Zeta Project, Silver Banshee and Jewelee in the DC animated film Suicide Squad: Hell to Pay, Yelena Belova in Avengers Assemble, and Jess Black in Ubisoft's Far Cry 5.

== Biography ==
Raised in Bala Cynwyd, Pennsylvania, Nathanson attended Friends' Central School and Tufts University before beginning her career in acting. Her screen debut came in 1996, with the recurring role of Amy on the television soap opera One Life to Live, followed shortly thereafter by appearances on Beverly Hills, 90210 (1996–97) and a brief stint as Maggie on Another World (1996). Nathanson subsequently appeared on several television films and series such as Kiss & Tell (1997), Soldier of Fortune, Inc. (1998–99), The Zeta Project (2001–02), and Spider-Man: The New Animated Series (2003). Since 2004, she is also often heard voicing different characters in video games.

In 2000, she wrote some episodes of the television series Just Deal and has also been nominated for a Writers Guild of America Award in the category Best Screenplay for a Teen series.

Nathanson is best known as a frequent voice actress with the Final Fantasy series. She also voices Chill in the Skylanders series, Scarlett Turner in Elena of Avalor, Samantha Maxis in Call of Duty: Black Ops, Lampita Pasionado in Psychonauts, Medic in StarCraft II: Wings of Liberty, and Robin Snyder in The Powerpuff Girls.

== Filmography ==
=== Voice over roles ===
==== Film ====
Year	Title	Role	Notes	Source
2001	The Trumpet of the Swan	Felicity		
2008	iGo to Japan	Swedish Voice	Television film	
2016	Throne of Elves	Queen Mayre	English dub	
2018	Searching	Natalie Boyd		
2018	Suicide Squad: Hell to Pay	Silver Banshee, Jewelee	Direct-to-video	
2019	Birds of a Feather	Francoise		
2021	Batman: The Long Halloween	Gilda Dent	Direct-to-video	
2022	Belle	Suzu's Mother	English dub	
2022	The Orbital Children	Isako Darmstadt Nobeyama	English dub	
2022	Marmaduke	Dottie Winslow		
2025	Fixed	Julia		

==== Television ====
Year	Title	Role	Notes	Source
2001	Batman Beyond	Rosalie "Ro" Rowan	Episode: "Countdown"	
2001	The Powerpuff Girls	Robin, Science Teacher, Schoolgirl #1, Young Mrs. Bellum	2 episodes	
2001–02	Johnny Bravo	Miss Winkleman, Model	2 episodes	
2001–02	The Zeta Project	Rosalie "Ro" Rowan	Main role	
2003	Stuart Little	Ginger	Episode: "A Little Too Fast"	
2003	Spider-Man: The New Animated Series	Sally Johnson	3 episodes	
2004	Megas XLR	Ally	Episode: "Terminate Her"	
2009	iCarly	Julie	Episode: "iTake on Dingo"	
2012	Mad	Velma Dinkley, Woman, Princess Fiona	Episode: "Real Veal/Celebrity Wife Swamp"	
2013	Sofia the First	Belle	Episode: "The Amulet and the Anthem"	
2015	Miles from Tomorrowland	Artist Bot	Episode: "Miles vs. the Volcano"	
2016	Pickle and Peanut	Guard Lady	Episode: "Francine/Cell Phone Tree"	
2016–19	Avengers Assemble	Yelena Belova / Crimson Widow	5 episodes	
2017	The Odd Couple	Vicki	Episode: "Conscious Odd Coupling"; uncredited	
2017	Be Cool, Scooby-Doo!	Kimmy, Kimmy's Mother	Episode: "I Scooby-Dooby-Do"	
2017	Shimmer and Shine	Afina	Episode: "All That Glitters"	
2017–19	Elena of Avalor	Scarlett Turner	4 episodes	
2018	Dallas & Robo	Computer		
2019	The Bravest Knight	Francine	2 episodes	
2020	Great Pretender	Farrah Brown	English dub	
2021	Eden	Geneva	English dub	
2021	Love, Death & Robots	Jharilla, Meck	Episode: "Snow in the Desert"	
2021	YUKI 7	Elinor	Main role, micro-series	
2022	Dota: Dragon's Blood	Rylai	3 episodes	
2022	Tiger & Bunny 2	Sigourney Rosicky		
2023	Gremlins: Secrets of the Mogwai	Warbler, Fox Spirits	3 episodes	
2024	Lego Marvel Avengers: Mission Demolition	Dazzler, Titania	Disney+ Television special	
2024–25	Hot Wheels Let's Race	Cruise	8 episodes	
2024–25	Blood of Zeus	Gorgo	4 episodes	

==== Video games ====
Year	Title	Role	Notes	Source
2004	EverQuest II	Nathania Sparkelbright, Ingrid, Guard Ssilith, Seamist Fairy Apatia, Racial Half Elf Ecology, Jiana Waterway, Merchant Barnes, Halfling Racial Ecology, Kelbri Mossborn, Habika, Mender Zanhass Mossclean		
2004	The Punisher	Lt. Molly von Richtofen, Joan, Central Zoo Announcer, Stark Towers Tour Guide		
2005	Psychonauts	Lampita Pasionado		
2005	Ape Escape 3	Aki	English dub	
2008	Speed Racer: The Videogame	Kelli "Gearbox" Kalinkov		
2008	MySims Kingdom	Sim		
2009	Call of Duty: World at War	Samantha Maxis	Uncredited	
2009	Night at the Museum: Battle of the Smithsonian	Cleopatra		
2009	My Sims Agents	Sim		
2010	Resonance of Fate	Frieda		
2010	Metal Gear Solid: Peace Walker	Soldiers	English dub	
2010	StarCraft II: Wings of Liberty	Medic, additional voices		
2010	Ninety-Nine Nights II	Female Magic Voice, Villager		
2010	Call of Duty: Black Ops	Samantha Maxis	Uncredited	
2011	Bulletstorm	Newsbot, Computer		
2011	The Sims Medieval	Sim		
2011	Dissidia 012: Final Fantasy	Prishe	English dub	
2011	Might & Magic Heroes VI	Anastasya Griffin		
2011	Shadows of the Damned	Sister Grim Kosatsu		
2011	Kinect: Disneyland Adventures			
2011	Final Fantasy XIII-2	Chocolina	English dub	
2012	Kingdoms of Amalur: Reckoning	Ethene, additional voices		
2012	Guild Wars 2	Yavvi, Naru, Inquest Operative, Riot Alice, Deborah, Priestess Amelia, Polinque, Varonos, Narrijoo, Varonos Marlooga, Asura, Human, Oracle, narrator, Quaggan, Shud, Kella		
2012–16	Skylanders series	Chill		
2013	Lightning Returns: Final Fantasy XIII	Chocolina	English dub	
2014	Teenage Mutant Ninja Turtles	April O'Neil		
2014	Infamous Second Son	Female Pedestrian No. 4		
2014	Murdered: Soul Suspect	Additional voices		
2015	Final Fantasy Type-0 HD	Clemente Yuzuki Ness Peacemaker	English dub	
2015	Lego Dimensions	Additional voices		
2015	Halo 5: Guardians	Marine		
2015	Call of Duty: Black Ops III	Samantha Maxis	The Giant and Zombies Chronicles DLCs	
2015	Fallout 4	Maria, Penny Fitzgerald		
2016	Mirror's Edge: Catalyst	Additional voices		
2016	Mighty No. 9	Call		
2016	Mobius Final Fantasy	Computer	English dub	
2016	World of Final Fantasy	Chocolatte	English dub	
2016	Final Fantasy XV	Holly Teulle, Coctura Arlund, Aera Mirus Fleuret	Also Comrades; Aera in Episode Ardyn; English dub	
2017	Horizon Zero Dawn	Anutai, additional voices	Frozen Wilds DLC	
2017	Mass Effect: Andromeda	Additional voices		
2017	Fortnite	Field Agent Rio		
2018	Far Cry 5	Jess Black		
2018	Spider-Man	Additional voices		
2018	Call of Duty: Black Ops 4	Samantha Maxis		
2018	Lego DC Super-Villains	Donna Troy, Silver Banshee		
2019	Judgment	Tsukino Saotome	English dub	
2020	Ninjala	Chloe, Lucy's Friend		
2020	Bugsnax	Aggroll, Banopper, Peelbug, Sprinklepede, Baby Cakelegs, and Bombino		
2020	Call of Duty: Black Ops Cold War	Samantha Maxis	Playable Character in Black Ops Season Two (2021)	
2020	World of Warcraft: Shadowlands	Kleia		
2020	Fallout 76: Steel Dawn	SODUS		
2020	The Last of Us Part II	Seraphites		
2021	Persona 5 Strikers	Additional voices	English dub	
2021	Deathloop	Eloise Sullohern, Eternalists		
2021	Lost Judgment	Tsukino Saotome		
2022	Bayonetta 3	Baal, Baal Zebul		
2022	Tactics Ogre: Reborn	Cerya Phoraena	English dub	
2022	My Little Pony: A Maretime Bay Adventure	Primrose, additional voices		
2023	League of Legends	Briar		
2024	Star Wars Outlaws	Ank		
2024	Helldivers 2	Helldiver Voice 3		
2024	Call of Duty: Black Ops 6	S.A.M.	Replaced by Unknown Actress in Season 1	
2025	Yakuza 0 Director's Cut	Additional voices		
2026	Yakuza Kiwami 3 & Dark Ties	Saki's mother		

=== Live action roles ===
==== Film ====
Year	Title	Role	Notes
1997	Kiss & Tell		Uncredited
1999	Entropy	Blind Date No. 1	

==== Television ====
Year	Title	Role	Notes
1996	One Life to Live	Amy	
1996	Another World	Maggie Cory	
1996–97	Beverly Hills, 90210	Ellen Fogerty	5 episodes
1998–99	Soldier of Fortune, Inc.	Debbie	7 episodes
1999	Law & Order	Katherine Rainer	Episode: "Sideshow"
1999	Homicide: Life on the Street	Katherine Rainer	Episode: "Sideshow"
2000–02	Just Deal	—N/a	Writer
