= Two-Face =

DC Comics supervillain

- From Two-Face: Year One #2 (October 2008). Art by Jesus Saiz and Jimmy Palmiotti.

Publication information
- Publisher: DC Comics
- First appearance: Detective Comics #66 (August 1942)
- Created by: Bob Kane

In-story information
- Alter ego: Harvey Dent
- Place of origin: Gotham City
- Team affiliations: Secret Society of Super Villains; Legion of Doom; Injustice League; Church of Two; Task Force Z; White Church
- Notable aliases: Holiday; White Knight
- Abilities: Criminal mastermind; Expert in criminal law and criminology; Skilled marksman and hand-to-hand combatant

Two-Face is a supervillain appearing in American comic books published by DC Comics. The character was created by Bob Kane, and first appeared in Detective Comics #66 (August 1942). He has become one of the superhero Batman's most enduring enemies belonging to the collective of adversaries that make up his rogues gallery.

In his comic book appearances, Two-Face is the alter ego of Harvey Dent, Gotham City's former district attorney who becomes a criminal mastermind obsessed with duality and the number two. Half of his face is hideously scarred after mob boss Sal Maroni throws acid at him. The resulting disfigurement drives him insane and causes him to make decisions based on the flip of a coin. The Modern Age of Comic Books portrays the character as having dissociative identity disorder, with Two-Face being an alternate personality that developed as a result of childhood abuse. The modern version is also established as having once been an ally of Batman and Commissioner James Gordon, and a close friend of Batman's secret identity, Bruce Wayne.

The character has been adapted in various media incarnations, having been portrayed in film by Billy Dee Williams in Batman (1989), Tommy Lee Jones in Batman Forever (1995), Aaron Eckhart in The Dark Knight (2008), Harry Lawtey in Joker: Folie à Deux (2024), and in television by Nicholas D'Agosto in the Fox series Gotham, and Misha Collins in The CW series Gotham Knights. Richard Moll, Troy Baker, and others have provided Two-Face's voice in animation and video games.

== Publication history ==
=== Creation and Golden Age history ===
Two-Face in Detective Comics #66. Art by Bob Kane.

Two-Face was created by Batman co-creator Bob Kane, and debuted in Detective Comics #66 ("The Crimes of Two-Face"), written by Batman's other co-creator Bill Finger, in August 1942 as a new Batman villain originally named Harvey "Apollo" Kent, a handsome, law-abiding former Gotham City district attorney close to the Batman. Half of his face was disfigured when a mob boss he was prosecuting, Sal Maroni, splashed Kent with acid, resulting in his loss of sanity and turn to crime, with his crimes centered around chance and the number 2. In creating Two-Face, Kane was inspired by the 1931 adaptation of the Robert Louis Stevenson story Strange Case of Dr Jekyll and Mr Hyde, which Kane described as a "classic story of the good and evil sides of human nature", and was also influenced by the 1925 silent film adaptation of Gaston Leroux's novel The Phantom of the Opera. Kane and Finger conceived the idea of Two-Face flipping a coin scarred on one side to determine which side of his personality emerges: evil if the coin flip results in the scarred side, which causes him to "go on a rampage of looting and destruction", or good if it results in the unscarred side, causing him to give his loot to charity or refrain from committing a crime. In Kane's autobiography Batman and Me, Kane suggests that Finger was inspired by the pulp magazine hero Black Bat, with their similarities as both district attorneys disfigured with acid. Two-Face's surname, Kent, was changed to Dent in Batman #50 (1948), which Bob Kane clarified was done to distance the character from Superman's alter ego, Clark Kent.

"The Crimes of Two-Face" also introduced Two-Face's devoted wife Gilda Dent, a long-standing character in Two-Face stories. Later appearances continued featuring the character's criminal life until he was cured through plastic surgery in his third appearance and shown reformed in 1952's "The Double Crimes of Two-Face!" (Detective Comics #187), with impostors taking Two-Face's place in later stories. Two-Face made his last appearance in the Golden Age of Comic Books in 1954's "Two-Face Strikes Again" (Batman #81), in which Two-Face returns to crime; however, this story is non-canon to the Golden Age version of the character, because only the Two-Face stories from 1942 to 1952 were assigned to DC's setting for their Golden Age characters, Earth-Two.

=== Dormancy and revitalization ===
The character was unused throughout the Silver Age of Comic Books, only appearing in the 173rd issue of World's Finest Comics in 1968 which featured Batman transforming into Two-Face. In July 1971, during the Bronze Age of Comic Books, Two-Face was brought back by writer Dennis O'Neil and former DC editor Julius Schwartz in the story "Half an Evil" (Batman #234). Written by O'Neil and drawn by Neal Adams, "Half an Evil" is a mystery story which features Two-Face stealing doubloons from a pirate ship; the issue also retold his origin with a recap of previous stories. After his reintroduction, Two-Face was featured in several DC comics, such as The Brave and The Bold, Justice League of America, and Teen Titans, and became one of Batman's most popular enemies.

=== Modern Age ===
External image
- The cover artwork drawn by Neal Adams for Batman (vol. 1) Annual #14, "The Eye of the Beholder".

Following the Crisis on Infinite Earths comic event which rebooted the DC Universe, Two-Face was reintroduced in Frank Miller's 1986 revision of Batman's origin, Batman: Year One, as Gotham City's former crusader against crime and former ally of Batman. Two-Face was given a revised origin by Andrew Helfer in 1990's "The Eye of the Beholder" (Batman Annual #14) which established Harvey Dent as having dissociative identity disorder effected by the psychological trauma from having been abused as a child by his father, with Two-Face being a second personality state, and cemented Dent as being formerly part of an alliance with Batman and Commissioner James Gordon against crime in Gotham City. 1995's Batman/Two-Face: Crime and Punishment by writer J. M. DeMatteis and artist Scott McDaniel built on "Eye of the Beholder" and explored Dent's psyche and traumatic childhood. Two-Face's origin was later expanded in writer Jeph Loeb and artist Tim Sale's 1996 Batman limited series The Long Halloween, which incorporated aspects of "Eye of the Beholder" and explored Batman, Gordon and Dent's struggle to end Gotham's Mob during the rise of costumed supervillains.

A reformed Dent rid of Two-Face was featured in the 2002 storyline Batman: Hush, continuing on to 2006 in the 52 limited series and in writer James Robinson's Batman arc "Face the Face", which explored Dent having trained under Batman and taking Batman's place as Gotham's protector during Batman's one-year absence, as well as Two-Face's return. In the 2006 limited series Two-Face: Year One written by Mark Sable, Two-Face was given a revamped origin, focusing on Dent's transformation into Two-Face during Dent's election campaign for district attorney, as well as establishing the relationship between a young Harvey Dent and Bruce Wayne, Batman's secret identity.

Following DC's New 52 reboot in 2011, Two-Face's origin was changed by writer Peter J. Tomasi in the 2014 Batman and Robin arc "The Big Burn", altering the cause of Dent's transformation into Two-Face and introducing Gilda Dent's death into his origin; the story also established Dent's knowledge of Bruce Wayne being Batman, and concluded with Dent dying by suicide. The subsequent DC Rebirth 2016 soft reboot reintroduced Two-Face in Scott Snyder's My Own Worst Enemy arc in All-Star Batman, in which Batman tries to obtain a cure to rid Dent of Two-Face in a road trip. Two-Face was then featured in the 2020 Detective Comics arc Ugly Heart, which showed Dent surviving his suicide attempt in Tomasi's previous story "The Big Burn" then starting a cult named the Church of Two, before being rid of Two-Face through brain surgery conducted by Batman. Dent is shown reformed throughout comics such as Matthew Rosenberg's 2021 limited series Task Force Z and Detective Comics.

"A lot of my work deals with what makes someone good, especially when they're on a darker path. With Harvey, the tension between good and bad and the idea that we've all got a little darkness in us makes him so compelling. He's trying to tip the scales toward redemption, but that's no easy task."

— Christian Ward, 2024

As part of the DC All In initiative in 2024, Two-Face received a limited series, penned by Christian Ward with art by Fábio Veras, colors by Ivan Plascencia and lettering by Hassan Otsmane-Elhaou. Ward came up with the idea of a story solely focusing on Two-Face after having written the non-canon story Batman: City of Madness that featured the character. DC approved of Ward's pitch of a Two-Face solo series and favored it to take place in the mainline Batman continuity. Ward was inspired by Perry Mason, and explored Harvey Dent back in the courtroom in the Gotham underworld court called the White Church, using his expertise in criminology to resolve the conflicts in Gotham's underground and make it a better place. Ward also explored the tension between Dent and Two-Face.

== Characterization ==
=== Description ===
Two-Face is a duality-obsessed criminal. Introduced in 1942 as a criminal mastermind obsessed with the number 2, Two-Face's crimes as well as his hideouts and henchmen surround the number; since the 1980s, Two-Face's duality obsession evolved into an obsession with the duality of man, with the character committing crimes based on his "misguided sense of right and wrong".

Two-Face views himself as both good and evil, and relies on flipping his double-headed coin, scarred on one side, in making important decisions and deciding whether his good or evil side will prevail.

Widely considered Batman's most tragic villain, Two-Face was established as a tragic figure in his debut: a former law-abiding district attorney turned criminal whose disfigurement resulted in him being shunned by society, which led to his turn to crime. In his early stories, Two-Face yearns to fix his face and bring back the love of his life whom he mistakenly thinks does not love him because of his disfigurement. 1990's "The Eye of the Beholder" (Batman Annual #14) reimagined Two-Face for the Modern Age as having been abused as a child by his father, and depicted him as being on the verge of a mental breakdown as a result of his repressed trauma and the pressure of fighting crime in Gotham, and driven to a point of desperation by Gotham's corruption. "Eye of the Beholder" also established Two-Face as a second personality state of Harvey Dent's dissociative identity disorder which resulted from his trauma; a psychiatrist in the story describes his condition as having "two personalities", with Dent having managed to "sublimate the second, anti-social one since he was a teenager".

=== Skills and abilities ===
Two-Face has no superpowers, instead relying on his proficiency in marksmanship and martial arts, which was further improved after being trained by Deathstroke and Batman. As a former lawyer, the character uses his expertise in criminal law, criminology, and police procedures to devise his crimes.

Before his transformation into Two-Face, Harvey Dent had a successful career as Gotham's district attorney, driven to bring an end to the city's epidemic of organized crime. Following his disfigurement, he becomes obsessed with the number two and the concept of duality. Thus, Two-Face stages crimes centered around the number two—such as robbing buildings with 2 in the address or staging events that will take place at 22:22 (10:22 p.m.). He was an accomplished lawyer highly skilled in almost all matters relating to criminal law and had an extensive knowledge of the criminal world. He is also a charismatic leader and speaker. Two-Face is gifted in criminal planning, has a high tolerance for pain, and recovers from smudging injuries in a short time. Two-Face is a skilled marksman, and regularly uses a variety of firearms such as pistols, shotguns, grenade launchers, Tommy guns, knives and rocket launchers during his battles with Batman. He primarily wields dual pistols.

Harvey Dent has kept himself in peak physical conditions, even before his transformation into Two-Face and had exercise equipment in his office when he was an assistant district attorney. The Batman: Face the Face story arc reveals that Batman, shortly before leaving Gotham for a year, trains Dent extensively in detective work and martial arts. To further improve his proficiency in the use of firearms, Dent hires the sharpshooting assassin Deathstroke to train him.

=== Relationships ===
This section details the character's most notable relationships across various interpretations of the Batman mythos:

==== Gilda ====
Gilda Dent in some iterations, is Harvey Dent's wife. Her character debuted in Detective Comics #66, alongside Harvey, and became a recurring character in Batman stories involving Two-Face.

==== Bruce Wayne ====
Batman's alter-ego Bruce Wayne is the best friend of Harvey Dent, while before becoming Two-Face, Harvey was also one of Batman's earliest allies, predating Batman's partnership with James Gordon. Their friendship goes back to Harvey's first appearance in Detective Comics, in which Batman refers to him as his friend and emotionally asks him to give up his life of crime. Because of this relationship, Two-Face is one of Batman's most personal enemies. In the comics, it is shown that Bruce considers Harvey's downfall a personal failure, and has never given up in rehabilitating him.

It is established canonically that Harvey knows Bruce Wayne is Batman. The character's knowledge of Batman's secret identity was introduced in the story The Big Burn from Peter Tomasi's 2011 Batman and Robin ongoing series, and is shown in subsequent comics such as Scott Snyder's All-Star Batman, in which they were established as childhood best friends. In Detective Comics #1021, Harvey admits to Batman that he has been keeping his identity secret from his Two-Face personality to protect him.

==== Renee Montoya ====
Renee Montoya and Two-Face have a complicated relationship, introduced by writer Greg Rucka in the sixteenth issue of 1999's Batman Chronicles, in which Renee reaches out to his Dent persona and is kind to him. Their relationship continues with the "No Man's Land" crossover storyline; in one issue, he sends her flowers for her birthday and she visits him in Arkham Asylum. He develops romantic feelings for Montoya, which she does not return. This one-sided love would turn into an unhealthy obsession with her, which would lead to her professional and personal ruin; in the five-part Gotham Central story arc Half a Life, Two-Face attempts to destroy Montoya's life by framing her for murder, outing her as a lesbian, and orchestrating a prison escape to make her a fugitive, all so she would nothing and nobody in her life but him.

Years after the release of Half a Life, Rucka would reunite the two in Convergence: The Question in 2015, following his return to DC Comics after his departure from the company in 2010. In the story, Montoya saves a remorseful Two-Face from killing himself and convinces him to be a good man.

Rucka has talked about the characters' relationship in an interview with Comic Book:

Renee and Harvey have always had a very odd bond, as far as I've written them, going back to the very first Renee story I did for DC, "Two Down". It's never been just cop-and-criminal between them. There's a peculiar understanding between them; Renee, to me, has always been able to see the path of Harvey's madness in a way that even Batman has never negotiated. I'm not sure I'd ever call them friends, especially after what he's put her through, but Renee has always been sympathetic to him, at least, and that care, that guardianship, drives much of our story.

==== Christopher Dent ====
Christopher Dent is Harvey Dent's abusive and alcoholic father, first introduced in the definitive Two-Face origin story Eye of the Beholder (Batman Annual #14). Dent would beat his son based on the flip of a coin: if it landed on heads, he would beat Harvey, and if it landed on tails, Harvey would escape punishment; because the coin was double-headed, Harvey would always be beaten. The trauma Harvey received from his father's constant abuse fueled the inner torment that eventually turns him into Two-Face.

== Character biography ==
=== Golden Age ===
Acid is thrown onto Harvey Kent's face in Detective Comics #66 (August 1942). Art by Bob Kane.

Two-Face's debut and Golden Age origin story, 1942's "The Crimes of Two-Face" (Detective Comics #66), introduced him as Harvey "Apollo" Kent, (Note: Nicknamed "Apollo" in the story because of his beauty) a handsome Gotham City district attorney prosecuting mob boss Sal Maroni; the issue also introduced his wife, Gilda Kent, (Note: "Kent" later changed to "Dent") who is a sculptor. During the trial, after Kent presents Maroni's lucky two-headed coin as evidence, an enraged Maroni throws acid at Kent's face, leaving half of it severely disfigured. Kent, rejected by society and Gilda because of his disfigurement, destroys his wife's sculpture of him and scars one side of Maroni's two-headed coin to symbolize his appearance's duality of beauty and ugliness, then flips the coin to decide whether to become a criminal or wait for the only plastic surgeon able to fix his face, who was caught in a concentration camp in Germany, to arrive. The coin lands on the scarred face, so Kent decides to become the criminal "Two-Face", who depends on flipping his coin to determine whether to be evil or good; afterwards, with the coin landing on the scarred side, Two-Face robs a bank, then, with the coin landing on the unscarred side, gives his loot to charity.

The rest of the issue features Two-Face committing a series of crimes centered on the number 2, one of which is stopped by Batman, who pursues and corners Two-Face after he escapes. Batman makes Two-Face a proposition to give himself up and start over, to which Two-Face replies that the coin makes all his decisions for him, then flips the coin. The issue ends with the coin landing on its edge, making Two-Face leave his life to fate, with the story being resolved in "The Man Who Led a Double Life!" (Detective Comics #68). Harvey Kent is cured through plastic surgery in 1943's "The End of Two-Face" (Detective Comics #80), and is shown reformed in 1952's "The Double Crimes of Two-Face!" (Detective Comics #187).

Kent would later be framed for crimes committed by imposters like his butler Wilkins, Paul Sloane, and George Blake.

Later, Kent attends the wedding of Bruce Wayne and Selina Kyle as a guest in 1981's "The Kill Kent Contract!" (Superman Family #211).

=== Bronze Age ===
The reintroduction of the villain Two-Face, in Batman #234 (August 1971). Art by Neal Adams.

In Two-Face's Bronze Age reintroduction, "Half an Evil" (Batman #234), Two-Face concocts an elaborate scheme to steal doubloons from a historical schooner, which Batman realizes and attempts to stop. As Batman approaches the ship, Two-Face finds and incapacitates him, then ties him up, leaving the ship after he lets it sink. Before Two-Face leaves, Batman tries to convince Two-Face to flip his coin to save an old man unwittingly caught in the trap by reminding him that he is both good and evil; Two-Face first disagrees until after his departure from the ship when he is unable to resist flipping his coin. With the coin landing on the unscarred side, Two-Face returns to the ship to rescue the old man, then sees Batman had escaped his restraints. Batman offers Two-Face to surrender, to which Two-Face disagrees and attempts to attack Batman, with Two-Face being knocked out unconscious by Batman afterwards. "Half a Life" also includes a recap of his Golden Age stories as his origin: from his transformation to Two-Face and his subsequent reformation to his criminal relapse, as depicted in the 1954 story "Two-Face Strikes Again!" (Batman #81), in which Harvey Dent's plastic surgery is undone after he attempts to prevent a robbery, causing his return as Two-Face.

In "Threat of the Two-Headed Coin!" (Batman #258), Two-Face is broken out of Arkham Hospital (Note: Later changed to Arkham Asylum) by a retired United States Army general who hires Two-Face to blackmail the United States government with an atomic bomb. After Two-Face betrays the general and takes over his plan, the general reveals the scheme to Batman, then dies by suicide out of remorse. Later, in the United States Capitol, Two-Face interrupts a Congress meeting to carry out the extortion scheme: in exchange for not exploding the Capitol with an atomic bomb, Two-Face demands the United States government to give him two billion dollars and gemstones, with Two-Face intending to use the money to bribe people to ignore his hideous appearance and end his misery; Batman foils Two-Face's plan.

Two-Face then appears in a number of non-Batman comics, such as The Joker, Justice League of America, and Teen Titans. The Joker's first issue, "The Joker's Double Jeopardy", features Two-Face and fellow Batman adversary Joker battling each other to prove who is the superior criminal, while Justice League of America's 125-26th issues, "The Men Who Sold Destruction!" and "The Evil Connection", shows Two-Face assisting the superhero team Justice League. In Teen Titans, Two-Face meets Teen Titans member Duela Dent who claims to be his daughter.

In the 313-314th issues of Batman, Two-Face steals a top secret missile activation code owned by the United States government and goes to New Orleans, with Batman and United States federal agent King Faraday reluctantly working together to trail him and obtain the code. On a float in the Mardi Gras parade, Two-Face deceives an American and a Russian representative who each negotiated for the code for $22,000,000 and steals $44,000,000 from them; Two-Face then escapes from the float to a blimp, with Batman and Faraday in pursuit. Afterwards, while Batman hangs from the blimp's hatch, Two-Face flips the coin to decide whether to kill him, with Faraday shooting the coin outwards the hatch. Two-Face, declaring that his life is meaningless without the coin, leaps for it and falls out of the blimp.

Two-Face changes his face through plastic surgery as well as his identity to Carl Ternion in Batman's 328-329th issues, and reunites with Gilda Dent to make her happy after her former husband, Dave Stevens, died. Two-Face then avenges Stevens' death by killing Sal Maroni, who had also changed his face and his identity to Anton Karoselle and had killed Gilda Dent's former husband. Karoselle's death and Two-Face and Maroni's changed identities are significant aspects of the mystery Batman solves in the story: how Ternion murdered Karoselle twice and had been acquitted for it, as Ternion admits in a video tape sent to Batman by Two-Face. Later, Two-Face runs away from Gilda Dent after his plastic surgery becomes undone, and afterwards, Batman tells Gilda Dent the truth about Ternion's actual identity and convinces her of a plan to lure and take down Two-Face: Batman disguises himself as Maroni attacking Gilda Dent as bait, and, with Two-Face chasing him, leads Two-Face to the Gotham City courthouse, where Batman and Gilda Dent convince Two-Face to rehabilitate himself in Arkham.

In the two-issue arc "Half a Hero... Is Better Than None!" from Batman #346 and Detective Comics #513, Two-Face escapes Arkham Asylum and puts Batman in an elaborate death trap set in a converted halfway house. He captures Batman and imprisoning him for a week, after which he attempts to rob a record company named Duo Records, and is stopped by Batman's sidekick, Robin. Two-Face, having escaped the encounter, returns to the halfway house. Batman escapes by creating and putting on a Two-Face mask, causing Two-Face to release him.

Two-Face's good and evil sides are in conflict in a four-issue storyline in Batman and Detective Comics, with his evil side being predominant. Two-Face allies with Batman villain Black Mask's former lover Circe who convinces him to steal a pharaoh's death mask concealed within a sarcophagus which she states to be imbued with magic that could restore his good side; this plan is revealed to be conceived by Batman, who is working with Circe to trick Two-Face into having his good side restored and have him rehabilitated. The plan doesn't work with Two-Face's evil side taking over.

=== Modern Age ===
The retelling of Two-Face's origin in Showcase '93 #7 (June 1993). Art by Klaus Janson.

The Post-Crisis and follow up in The Long Halloween established this version of Two-Face as depicted as having had an unhappy childhood; his father was a mentally ill alcoholic who beat him regularly, often deciding whether or not to brutalize his son based on a flip of his lucky coin. The abuse instilled in Dent his lifelong struggle with free will and his eventual inability to make choices on his own, relying on the coin to make all of his decisions. Dent is diagnosed with dissociative identity disorder at a young age, but manages to hide his illnesses and, thanks to an unyielding work ethic, rises up through the ranks of Gotham City's district attorney's office until, at age 26, he becomes the youngest DA in the city's history. Gordon even suspected that Dent could be Batman, but discarded this suspicion when he realized that Dent lacked the vigilante's financial resources. Dent forges an alliance with Gordon and Batman to rid Gotham of organized crime. Mob boss Carmine Falcone bribes corrupt Assistant District Attorney Vernon Fields to provide his lieutenant Sal Maroni, whom Dent is trying for murder, with sulfuric acid; Maroni throws the acid in Dent's face during a cross-examination, horribly scarring the left side of Dent's face. Dent escapes from the hospital and reinvents himself as the gangster Two-Face. He scars one side of his father's coin and uses it to decide whether to commit a crime. Two-Face takes revenge on Falcone, Fields and Maroni, but is captured by Batman, leading to his incarceration in Arkham Asylum.

During the Batman: Dark Victory story arc, the serial killer Hangman targets various cops who assisted in Dent's rise to the D.A.'s office. Two-Face gathers Gotham's criminals to assist in the destruction of the city's crime lords. After a climactic struggle in the Batcave, Two-Face is betrayed by the Joker, who shoots at Dent, causing him to fall into a chasm, presumably to his death. Batman admits in the aftermath that, even if Two-Face has survived, Harvey Dent is gone forever. During a much later period, Two-Face is revealed to have murdered the father of Jason Todd, the second Robin. When attempting to apprehend Two-Face, Jason briefly has the criminal at his mercy, but lets Two-Face's punishment be decided by the law. Two-Face similarly serves as a 'baptism by fire' for Tim Drake, the third Robin. Two-Face has Batman at his mercy, but Tim dons the Robin suit to save Batman.

In Arkham Asylum: A Serious House on Serious Earth, Arkham's doctors replace Dent's coin with a die and a tarot deck, but rather than becoming self-reliant, Dent is now unable to make even the smallest of decisions—such as going to the bathroom. Batman returns the coin, telling Two-Face to use it to decide whether to kill him. Batman leaves safely, but it is implied that Two-Face made his own decision to let Batman live.

In the No Man's Land storyline, in which Gotham is devastated by an earthquake, Two-Face claims a portion of the ruined city, takes up residence in Gotham City Hall, and forms a temporary alliance with Gordon to share certain territory. His empire is brought down by Bane (employed by Lex Luthor), who destroys Two-Face's gang during his destruction of the city's Hall of Records. Two-Face kidnaps Gordon and puts him on trial for his activities after Gotham City is declared a "No Man's Land", with Two-Face as both judge and prosecutor for Gordon's illegal alliance with him; Gordon later plays upon Two-Face's split psyche to demand Harvey Dent as his defense attorney. Dent cross-examines Two-Face and wins an acquittal for Gordon, determining that Two-Face has effectively blackmailed Gordon by implying that he had committed murders to aid the Commissioner. During this time, Two-Face also meets detective Renee Montoya. Montoya reaches the Dent persona in Two-Face and is kind to him. He falls in love with her, though the romance is one-sided.

In Gotham Central, he outs her as a lesbian and frames her for murder, hoping that if he takes everything from her, she will be left with no choice but to be with him. She is furious, and the two fight for control of his gun until Batman intervenes, putting Two-Face back in Arkham.

In the Batman: Two-Face - Crime and Punishment one-shot comic book, Two-Face captures his own father, planning to humiliate and kill him on live television for the years of abuse that he suffered. This story reveals that, despite his apparent hatred for his father, Dent still supports him, paying for an expensive home rather than allowing him to live in a slum. At the end of the book, the Dent and Two-Face personalities argue in thought, Two-Face calling Dent "spineless". Dent proves Two-Face wrong, choosing to jump off a building and commit suicide just to put a stop to his alter ego's crime spree. Two-Face is surprised when the coin flip comes up scarred but abides by the decision and jumps. Batman catches him, but the shock of the fall seems to (at least temporarily) destroy the Two-Face personality. In Batman: Two-Face Strikes Twice!, Two-Face is at odds with his ex-wife Gilda Grace Dent, as he believes their marriage failed because he was unable to give her children. She later marries Paul Janus (a reference to the Roman god of doors, who had two faces). Two-Face attempts to frame Janus as a criminal by kidnapping him and replacing him with a stand-in, whom Two-Face "disfigures" with makeup. Batman catches Two-Face, and Gilda and Janus reunite. Years later, Gilda gives birth to twins, prompting Two-Face to escape once more and take the twins hostage, as he erroneously believes them to be conceived by Janus using an experimental fertility drug. The end of the book reveals that Two-Face is the twins' natural father.

==== Batman: Hush ====
In the Batman: Hush storyline, Dent's face is repaired by plastic surgery, seemingly eradicating the Two-Face personality. Dent takes the law into his own hands twice: once by using his ability to manipulate the legal system to free the Joker, and then again by shooting the serial killer Hush. He manipulates the courts into setting him free, as Gotham's prosecutors would not attempt to charge him without a body.

==== Return to villainy ====
In the Batman story arc Batman: Face the Face, which started in Detective Comics #817, and was part of DC's One Year Later storyline, it is revealed that, at Batman's request and with his training, Harvey Dent becomes a vigilante protector of Gotham City in most of Batman's absence of nearly a year. He is reluctant to take the job, but Batman assures him that it will serve as atonement for his past crimes. After a month of training, they fight Firebug and Mr. Freeze, before Batman leaves for a year. Dent enjoys his new role, but his methods are more extreme and less refined than Batman's. Upon Batman's return, Dent begins to feel unnecessary and unappreciated, which prompts the return of the "Two-Face" persona (seen and heard by Dent through hallucinations). In Face the Face, his frustration is compounded by a series of mysterious murders that seem to have been committed by Two-Face; the villains KGBeast, Magpie, Ventriloquist and Scarface, and Orca are all shot twice in the head with a double-barreled pistol. When Batman confronts Dent about these deaths, asking him to confirm that he was not responsible, Dent refuses to give a definite answer. He then detonates a bomb in his apartment and leaves Batman dazed as he flees. Despite escaping the explosion physically unscathed, Dent suffers a crisis of conscience and a mental battle with his "Two-Face" personality. Although Batman later uncovers evidence that exonerates Dent for the murders, establishing that he was framed as revenge for his efforts against new crime boss Warren White, a.k.a. the Great White Shark, it is too late to save him. Prompted by resentment and a paranoid reaction to Batman's questioning, Dent scars half his face with nitric acid and a scalpel, becoming Two-Face once again. Blaming Batman for his return, Two-Face immediately goes on a rampage, threatening to destroy the Gotham Zoo (having retained two of every animal—including two humans) before escaping to fight Batman another day. Batman subsequently confronts White, while acknowledging that he cannot attack White, as there is no explicit evidence supporting Batman's deductions, vowing to inform Two-Face of White's actions when they next face each other.

On the cover of Justice League of America (vol. 2) #23, Two-Face is shown as a member of the new Injustice League. He can be seen in Salvation Run. He appears in Battle for the Cowl: The Underground, which shows the effects of Batman's death on his enemies. In Judd Winick's Long Shadow arc, Two-Face realizes that someone else has taken over as Batman. He hires a teleporter and manages to infiltrate the Batcave. When the new Batman investigates the cave, Two-Face ambushes him with tranquilizer darts, and in a hallucination he sees Dent in a red and black Two-Face themed Batman costume. Alfred Pennyworth saves the hero from Two-Face's torture after subduing his accomplice, and with his help Batman convinces Two-Face that he is the real, original Dark Knight, informing Dent that his problem is that he cannot imagine Batman changing because he himself is incapable of seeing the world in anything other than black and white. In Streets of Gotham, Two-Face has been at odds with Gotham's latest district attorney, Kate Spencer, also known as the vigilante Manhunter. Two-Face is later driven out of Gotham City by Jeremiah Arkham.

==== The New 52 ====
In September 2011, The New 52 rebooted DC's continuity. Here, Two-Face's origin is revised significantly. Harvey Dent is a successful defense attorney whose clientele includes twin sisters from the McKillen crime family, Shannon and Erin. The sisters coerce Dent to become their family's legal retainer for life. They then place a contract on James Gordon and his entire family, despite Dent's protestations. The Gordons survive the attempt on their lives, but Dent, bound by attorney-client confidentiality, is unable to dissuade the McKillens from continuing their lethal vendetta. The violent attempt on the Gordons' lives prompts Bruce Wayne to initiate and fund Dent's campaign for district attorney. Dent becomes D.A. and has the McKillen sisters prosecuted and sentenced to life in prison. After Shannon commits suicide, Erin escapes by switching places with her sister's corpse. Blaming Dent for her sister's death, Erin breaks into Dent's house, kills Gilda in front of him, and pours acid on his face, transforming him into Two-Face. Several years later, Erin McKillen returns to Gotham City to kill Two-Face, and thus reassert her control of her family's criminal operations. Her return sparks a climactic battle between her, Two-Face, and Batman. Two-Face scars McKillen with the same acid she used on him, but Batman stops him from killing her. Batman and Two-Face continue battling, with Batman trying to convince his foe to end his vendetta. Two-Face then calls Batman, "Bruce", revealing that he knows Batman's secret identity. Two-Face reveals that he struggled internally for quite some time over whether to kill his former friend, but decided not to because it would have violated his sense of justice. He disappears after the battle and Batman is unable to track him.

Several panels of Batman and Robin #28 imply that Two-Face commits suicide by shooting himself in the head.

==== DC Rebirth ====
In 2016, DC Comics implemented a relaunch of its books called "DC Rebirth", which restored its continuity to a form much as it was prior to "The New 52". Batman decides to cure Two-Face, doing whatever it takes. Following a confrontation with Two-Face and his henchmen - Killer Moth, Firefly, and Black Spider - Batman takes Two-Face into his custody, until they both have to fight KGBeast. They defeat KGBeast, but are badly injured. Batman nurses Two-Face back to health, but Two-Face suspects Batman of trying to betray him and rubs acid in his eyes. Two-Face and Batman mend their relationship somewhat to fight KGBeast, the Penguin, and Black Mask. Batman tells Two-Face that he can cure Two-Face's split personality. Two-Face does not trust Batman to help him, however, and so threatens to destroy Gotham City with poison gas unless Batman gives him the cure. In the end, Batman injects Two-Face with the "cure", which turns out to be a sedative that renders Two-Face unconscious. Batman then takes Two-Face back to Arkham.

In the Deface the Face story arc, Two-Face goes to Batman for help. Harvey Dent had murdered a man whom he could not convict in trial. Two-Face says, "...Harvey's the good one. He has to be. Otherwise, what am I?", and then decides to help Batman and Gordon bring down the terrorist group Kobra. In Doomsday Clock, Two-Face is among the villains who attend the underground meeting held by the Riddler. In Harley Quinn: Rebirth, while Harley Quinn's Gang of Harleys is trying to find information about Man-Bat, they encounter Two-Face in Arkham Asylum, where he makes threats towards the group.

== Other characters named Two-Face ==
=== Wilkins ===
The first impostor was Wilkins, Harvey Dent's butler who uses makeup to suggest that Dent had suffered a relapse and disfigured his own face. This would give Wilkins the cover to commit crimes as Two-Face.

=== Paul Sloane ===
Paul Sloane becomes the second impostor of Two-Face. An actor, Sloane is disfigured by an accident on the set of a biography film about Two-Face. This occurred when a prop boy working on the film got jealous at the fact that his girlfriend developed a crush on Sloane. This causes the prop man to switch out the water with actual acid that was to be used for the trial scene. Sloane's mind snaps and he begins to think that he is Dent. Sloane recovers some of his own personality, but continues to commit crimes as Two-Face. Batman confronted Sloane and managed to trick the criminal to undergo a reconstructive surgery which would cure his mental illness. Sloane is reused in later Earth-Two stories as Two-Face, with the Earth-Two version of Harvey Dent remaining healed.

After the Crisis on Infinite Earths event, Paul Sloane, with a near-identical history to the pre-Crisis version, appears in Detective Comics #580-581. In Double Image, Harvey Dent (as Two-Face) employs the Crime Doctor to re-disfigure Sloane. Dent does this out of jealous bitterness and the hope that Sloane would commit crimes based on the number two, thus confusing Batman. At the end of the story, Sloane is once again healed physically and mentally.

A new take on the Paul Sloane character is re-introduced into post-Zero Hour: Crisis in Time! as a criminal called the Charlatan in Detective Comics #777 (February 2003). In this incarnation, Sloan is an actor who had been hired by Joker, Penguin, Riddler, Mad Hatter, Scarecrow, and Killer Moth to take Two-Face's place in a scheme to kill Batman. They had originally offered Two-Face the part in the scheme, but his coin landed on the non-scarred side. During his impersonation of Two-Face, Batman discovered that this Two-Face was an impostor when he killed a security guard without consulting the coin. When the real Two-Face learns about this, he captures Sloan and disfigures his face. Scarecrow then experiments on Sloan with fear toxins. Driven insane and deprived of fear, Sloan becomes Charlatan, intending to get revenge on the criminals who hired him and complete his mission to kill Batman. Charlatan is defeated by Batman and incarcerated at Arkham Asylum.

=== George Blake ===
The third impostor of Two-Face is George Blake, a petty criminal who passed himself off as a manager of an anti-crime exhibition. However, he is not actually disfigured, but is wearing make-up. Furthermore, his makeup is worn on the opposite side of his face to Harvey Dent or Paul Sloane, which easily enabled Batman to identify him as an impostor. Batman defeats Blake and clears Dent's name.

=== Batman as Two-Face ===
Also noteworthy is a 1968 story where Batman himself is temporarily turned into Two-Face via a potion.

=== Two-Face-Two ===
In Batman #700, which establishes Terry McGinnis as part of the DC Universe canon, it is revealed that Two-Face-Two kidnapped Terry and Professor Carter Nichols, and tried to disfigure them in the style of the Joker. His plans were foiled by Damian Wayne, the fifth Robin and Batman's biological son. Unlike the original Two-Face, this version was born deformed and flips two coins instead of one. He is then killed when a machine falls on him. Another Two-Face-Two is briefly mentioned during the course of the DC One Million storyline, when the Batman of the 853rd century comments how this villain was defeated when the second Batman convinced him that the law of averages proved his coin-tossing would ultimately cause him to make more "good" decisions than "bad" ones.

== Other versions ==
Jessica Dent as depicted in Batman: Earth One (vol. 3)

Many alternate universe versions of Two-Face have appeared throughout the character's publication history. In The Dark Knight Returns, Harvey Dent was physically healed via plastic surgery, but at the unforeseen cost of destroying his personality. In Batman: In Darkest Knight, Dent was scarred by Sinestro, empowered with his Lantern energy, and became Binary Star, a composite identity based on Evil Star. In Batman/Tarzan: Claws of the Cat-woman, Finnegan Dent is an explorer who was mauled by a lion during an expedition. In Batman: Two Faces, Harvey Dent lost his split personality after taking a potion created by Bruce Wayne and succeeded him as Batman following his death. In Batman: The Doom That Came to Gotham, Dent was mutated by Talia al Ghul and used as a conduit to resurrect Ra's al Ghul before being killed by Batman. In Catwoman: Guardian of Gotham, Darcy Dent is a gender-flipped version of Two-Face who was scarred after a rival of hers hired a hitman to lace her facial cream with acid. Unlike the mainstream incarnation, she does not rely on coin flips and lacks a split personality. In Batgirl and Batman: Thrillkiller '62, Harvey Dent is the mayor of Gotham City. In the Tangent Comics comics imprint, where characters are completely reimagined, Harvey Dent is an African-American man with psionic powers and his world's Superman. In Flashpoint, Harvey Dent is a judge. In the Flashpoint sequel Flashpoint Beyond, Dent is killed by Scavenger, leading Batman to adopt his son Dexter. Harvey's wife Gilda Dent, driven insane after their children are kidnapped by the Joker, becomes this universe's Two-Face. In Batman: Earth One, Harvey Dent was killed by Sal Maroni, leading his sister Jessica Dent to become Two-Face and manifest a split personality based on her brother. In the Absolute Universe, Harvey Dent is a civil servant in the District Attorney's office and childhood friend of Bruce Wayne. In the Abomination arc, Harvey, Oswald, and Edward are attacked and mutilated by Bane, who cracks Harvey's skull in two and burns half his body, giving him brain damage.

== See also ==
- List of Batman family enemies
- Batman: The Long Halloween
- Batman: Dark Victory
- Gilda Dent
