= Bruce Wayne (Dark Knight trilogy) =

Fictional film character

- The Dark Knight trilogy character
- Bruce Wayne, as portrayed by Christian Bale in The Dark Knight (2008)
- First appearance: Batman Begins (2005)
- Last appearance: The Dark Knight Rises (2012)
- Based on: Batman by: Bob Kane; Bill Finger
- Adapted by: Christopher Nolan; David S. Goyer
- Portrayed by: Christian Bale (adult); Gus Lewis (young)
- Voiced by: Christian Bale (Batman Begins video game); Kevin Conroy (Batman: Gotham Knight); Hynden Walch (Batman: Gotham Knight; young)

In-universe information
- Alias: The Batman
- Nickname: The Dark Knight
- Title: Owner of Wayne Enterprises
- Occupation: Entrepreneur; Philanthropist; Investor; Vigilante
- Family: Unnamed paternal grandfather; Thomas Wayne (father); Martha Wayne (mother)
- Significant other: Selina Kyle
- Nationality: American
- Abilities: Genius-level intellect; Master detective; Master martial artist and hand-to-hand combatant; Master tactician, strategist, and field commander; Peak human physical and mental condition; Acrobatic prowess; Expert in criminology and interrogation tactics; Mastery in stealth, espionage, and infiltration; Exceptional scientist and engineer; Indomitable will; Photographic memory; Utilizes high-tech equipment and weapons; Access to vast wealth and resources

Bruce Wayne, also known by his superhero vigilante persona Batman, is a fictional character who is the main protagonist in Christopher Nolan's trilogy of superhero films, based on the DC Comics character of the same name, created by Bill Finger and Bob Kane. Portrayed by Christian Bale, this version of Batman is arguably explored more in-depth compared to that of the previous film series by Tim Burton and Joel Schumacher, as the Dark Knight film series provides a full arc for the character and was intended by Nolan to be more realistic than previous portrayals.

In the films, Bruce is the billionaire owner of the technology firm Wayne Enterprises. After witnessing the murder of his parents at age eight and motivated by his love for Rachel Dawes (Katie Holmes and Maggie Gyllenhaal), Bruce travels the world to train to fight crime, returning to claim inheritance of his father's company. Subsequently, he begins fighting crime in Gotham City as Batman, using advanced military-predicated technology in doing so and basing his persona on conquering his fear of bats, starting his path as a hero.

Bale's portrayal of Batman has often been considered one of the greatest of the character in film, and has also been credited with the success of the Dark Knight film series, with the latter two films both grossing over $1 billion each, and thus, the restoration of public interest in Batman in the 21st century.

== Fictional character biography ==
=== Childhood ===
Born in 1975, Bruce Wayne first appears in the film Batman Begins. As a child, he falls into a well on his parents' estate and is rescued by his father Thomas (Linus Roache), but develops a fear of bats after being attacked by a colony of them. Bruce tours a new monorail funded by his father, who explains that he nearly bankrupted his company Wayne Enterprises to build it to help Gotham City, which is experiencing an economic depression. Bruce then accompanies his parents to see the opera Mefistofele, but is frightened by a bat-like character in the production. As his parents take him home, they are confronted by a mugger named Joe Chill (Richard Brake), who shoots them both out of panic, killing them right in front of Bruce and leaving him deeply traumatized. Bruce is comforted by police officer James Gordon (Gary Oldman) as Chill is arrested, then raised by his parents' butler Alfred Pennyworth (Michael Caine).

=== Youth ===
Fourteen years later, Bruce — still mourning his parents — plans to kill the recently paroled Chill. Before Bruce can take his revenge, however, Chill is murdered by an assassin working for mob boss Carmine Falcone (Tom Wilkinson), whom Chill was going to testify against. When Bruce tells his childhood sweetheart Rachel Dawes (Katie Holmes) what he had planned to do, she is disgusted and lectures him about the difference between justice and revenge, which motivates him to confront Falcone himself. Falcone dismisses Bruce, stating that he does not understand the criminal world, so Bruce leaves Gotham, intending to explore the world to find the means to fight injustice.

=== Training ===
Over the next seven years, Bruce travels the world to study the criminal mind, often committing petty crimes himself to survive. After being arrested in Bhutan for robbery and engaging in a prison fight, Bruce is approached by Henri Ducard (Liam Neeson), who invites him to join the League of Shadows, an elite vigilante group. Bruce trains with Ducard and the League, conquering his fears, but refuses their final test: the execution of a thief. When Bruce learns that the League intends to destroy Gotham City, believing it to be beyond saving, he burns down the League's temple, killing their leader Ra's al Ghul (Ken Watanabe) but saving an unconscious Ducard.

=== Becoming Batman ===
The Batsuit, worn by Christian Bale in Batman Begins (2005)

Bruce returns to Gotham, intending to use the martial arts skills he learned from the League to fight crime as a symbol of fear. Bruce takes an interest in Wayne Enterprises, which is being taken public by the unscrupulous William Earle (Rutger Hauer). Company archivist Lucius Fox (Morgan Freeman), a friend of Bruce's father, allows Bruce access to prototype defense technologies, including a protective bodysuit and a heavily armored vehicle, the Tumbler. Bruce poses publicly as a shallow playboy, while setting up a base in the caves beneath Wayne Manor and taking up the vigilante identity of "Batman", inspired by his childhood fear. He reaches out to Rachel, now the city's assistant district attorney, and Gordon, now a sergeant, to aid him in his fight against crime.

While patrolling as Batman one night, Bruce intercepts a drug shipment from Falcone, ties him up, and provides incriminating evidence for Rachel and Gordon to use in arresting him. Dr. Jonathan Crane (Cillian Murphy), Arkham Asylum's corrupt psychopharmacologist, doses Falcone with a fear-inducing hallucinogen, driving him insane. Batman confronts Crane, who doses him with the hallucinogen as well, incapacitating him with visions of his parents' murder. Alfred rescues him, however, and Fox administers an antidote.

When Rachel accuses Crane of corruption, he reveals he has introduced his drug into Gotham's water supply. He drugs Rachel, but Batman subdues and interrogates Crane, who claims to work for Ra's al Ghul. Batman evades the police to get Rachel to safety, administering the antidote to her and giving her a vial for Gordon's use and another for mass production.

At Bruce’s thirtieth birthday party, Ducard reappears and reveals himself as the true Ra’s al Ghul, explaining that the man previously believed to be Ra’s was merely a decoy. Having stolen a microwave emitter from Wayne Enterprises, he intends to vaporize Gotham’s water supply, dispersing Crane’s toxin into the air and triggering mass hysteria that will lead to the city’s destruction. He further reveals that the League of Shadows engineered Gotham’s economic decline, indirectly contributing to the murder of Bruce’s parents by driving people like Chill to crime.

Ra’s sets Wayne Manor on fire and leaves Bruce to die, but Alfred rescues him. He then loads the microwave emitter onto Gotham’s monorail system, planning to release the toxin at the city’s central water source. Batman rescues Rachel from a drugged mob and indirectly reveals his identity to her. Meanwhile, Gordon uses the Tumbler’s cannons to destroy part of the track. Batman confronts Ra’s aboard the train, defeats him, and escapes, leaving his former mentor to perish as the train crashes.

Bruce wins Rachel's respect and love, but she decides she cannot be with him as long as Gotham needs Batman. Batman becomes a public hero, and Bruce reveals he has purchased a controlling stake in Wayne Enterprises, firing Earle and replacing him with Fox. Gordon is promoted to Lieutenant and shows Batman the Bat-Signal, and tells him of a criminal who leaves behind Joker playing cards. Batman promises to look into it before disappearing into the night.

=== Fight against the Joker and fall from grace ===
In 2008, Batman has become a thorn in the side of Gotham's organized crime families, and inspired the public – to the point that several gun-toting vigilantes have begun dressing as him and attacking criminals in a misguided attempt to help his crusade. Batman stops a group of these vigilantes when they attack Crane and a group of mobsters, and apprehends the entire group. However, injuries suffered during the confrontation lead Bruce to design a new, more versatile suit of armor. In addition to the Bat-Signal, Gordon communicates with Batman via an encrypted mobile phone signal. They contemplate bringing Gotham's new district attorney — and Rachel's boyfriend, Harvey Dent (Aaron Eckhart) — in on their plan to eradicate the mob. While Bruce is Dent's rival for Rachel's affection, he is impressed by the D.A.'s dedication to fighting crime and hopes that Dent will become the city's protector, allowing him to give up being Batman and live a normal life with Rachel. Bruce travels to Hong Kong under the guise of a weekend fling with the Russian Ballet to apprehend the mob's accountant, Lau (Chin Han), as Batman so Gordon and Dent can use him to confiscate the mob's money. Meanwhile, Batman and Gordon become aware of a murderous bank robber calling himself "the Joker" (Heath Ledger).

Mob bosses Sal Maroni (Eric Roberts) and the Chechen (Ritchie Coster) pay the Joker half of their money to kill Batman. The Joker publicly threatens to kill people every day until Batman reveals his true identity, and makes good on his threat by killing Commissioner Gillian B. Loeb (Colin MacFarlane) and, apparently, Gordon. Bruce decides to turn himself in to the police and shares another kiss with Rachel, who says that they cannot be together if he goes to prison. Before Bruce can give himself up, however, Dent publicly admits to being Batman to draw the Joker out of hiding. The Joker attempts to kill Dent during transport, but Gordon (who faked his death) and Batman intervene in time to apprehend him.

With the Joker in custody, Batman and Gordon, now promoted to GCPD Commissioner, believe that the crisis is over, but become alarmed when Dent goes missing. Desperate to find Dent, Batman interrogates the Joker, who exposes Batman's love triangle with Rachel and Dent, and reveals that they have been taken to opposite sides of the city, far enough apart that Batman would not have time to save both of them. Batman speeds off to save Rachel, while Gordon and the police head after Dent. Unbeknownst to them, however, the Joker had switched the locations, sending Batman after Dent and Gordon after Rachel. Batman rescues Dent just as both buildings explode, but Dent's face is disfigured, and Rachel is killed. Bruce is devastated by her death, taking solace only in the belief that she would have chosen him; to spare him pain, Alfred decides to burn a letter Rachel had given him in which she wrote that she had decided to marry Dent. Meanwhile, the Joker convinces Dent to take revenge against the people he blames for Rachel's death: Gordon and Batman.

When the Joker threatens to blow up a hospital unless someone kills Coleman Reese (Joshua Harto), a Wayne Enterprises fiduciary who has deduced Batman's secret identity, Bruce risks his life to save him, persuading Reese to keep his secret. The Joker then kidnaps a busload of people and puts them on a ferry rigged to explode, threatening to kill them unless they remotely detonate another similarly rigged ferry full of prisoners, while his men hold another group of hostages at gunpoint. Batman persuades a reluctant Fox to use a sonar device to monitor all of Gotham so he can find the Joker. Batman frees the hostages and subdues the Joker, while neither group on the ferries destroys the other. The Joker nevertheless gloats that the citizens of Gotham will lose faith in humanity once they learn of Dent's murderous rampage as the vigilante "Two-Face". Horrified, Batman goes to find Dent as the Joker is taken into custody.

Batman finds Dent holding Gordon and his family hostage at the site of Rachel's death. Dent threatens to kill Gordon's son to inflict upon him the pain of losing a loved one, but Batman persuades him to pass judgment on the people he holds responsible for Rachel's death: Batman, himself, and Gordon. Dent flips his lucky coin to decide their fates, shooting Batman and sparing himself. As Dent is about to kill Gordon's son, Batman, who is wearing body armor, tackles him off a ledge to his death, saving the boy before falling and injuring his leg. Determined to preserve Dent's heroic image, Batman convinces Gordon to let him take the blame for Dent's crimes, and disappears into the night, now branded a murderer.

=== Reclusion ===
Eight years later, Bruce has become a recluse, still mourning Rachel's death and rarely leaving Wayne Manor. In addition, Wayne Enterprises is losing money after Bruce discontinued a fusion reactor project three years prior when he learned that it could be weaponized. However, his efforts to rid Gotham of crime have been successful. Using Dent's image as a martyred hero, Gordon and Gotham's politicians have eradicated organized crime in the city with the Dent Act, a bill that gives the police increased authority. Bruce hosts "Harvey Dent Day" at Wayne Manor, but does not join the festivities. Cat burglar Selina Kyle (Anne Hathaway) steals a pearl necklace belonging to Bruce's late mother, and overpowers him when he tries to stop her. Bruce discovers that the real target was his fingerprints and not the necklace. Bruce tracks Selina to a gala and takes back the pearls, but Selina escapes again.

Shortly afterward, Bruce is visited by police officer John Blake (Joseph Gordon Levitt), who tells him about an attack on Gordon by Bane (Tom Hardy), an excommunicated member of the League of Shadows. Blake also tells Bruce that he has deduced his secret identity as Batman and can relate to him; Blake, too, is an orphan by reason of violent crime, who has learned to hide his anger. He asks Bruce to return as Batman.

=== Returning as Batman ===
Against Alfred's advice, Bruce resurfaces as Batman to pursue Bane, but the police opt to chase him instead. When Bruce returns home, he gets into an argument with Alfred, who fears that Bruce will get himself killed. Alfred reveals that Rachel chose Dent over him and resigns from his service.

Batman saves Selina from Bane and his men, escaping in the Bat, a giant aerial craft made by Fox. Surprised that Batman is the "powerful friend" Bruce told her of, Selina informs him that she sold Bruce's fingerprints to John Daggett (Ben Mendelsohn), Bruce's corrupt business rival. Bane uses Bruce's stolen fingerprints to make a series of transactions that bankrupt Bruce. Bruce is fired from Wayne Enterprises' Board of Trustees, but persuades CEO Miranda Tate (Marion Cotillard) to prevent Daggett from taking over the company. Bane then kills Daggett, who had secretly been working with him. Bruce and Miranda spend the night together before Selina takes him to see Bane in his hideout. Bane reveals that he intends to fulfill Ra's al Ghul's mission to destroy Gotham. Batman fights Bane, but Bane breaks his back and takes him to an underground prison in a Middle Eastern desert.

=== Imprisonment in the Pit ===
The inmates tell Bruce the story of Ra's al Ghul's child, who was born and raised in the prison before escaping – the only prisoner to have done so. Bruce helplessly watches news coverage of Bane turning Gotham into a no man's land – freeing its criminals, imprisoning the police, and revealing the truth about Dent's crimes.

=== Apparent death of Batman ===
Months later, a recovered Bruce escapes from the prison and returns to Gotham after Bane has taken over the city, planning to destroy it with the fusion reactor. Batman frees the police, and they clash with Bane's army in the streets; during the battle, Batman overpowers Bane. Miranda intervenes and stabs Batman, revealing herself as Talia al Ghul, Ra's al Ghul's daughter, and pledging to complete her father's work and avenge his death. She activates the bomb's detonator, but Gordon blocks the signal. Talia leaves to find the bomb while Bane prepares to kill Batman, but Selina arrives and kills Bane. Batman and Selina pursue Talia, hoping to retrieve the bomb and return it to the reactor chamber, where it can be stabilized. Talia's truck crashes, but she remotely floods and destroys the reactor chamber before dying. With no way to stop the detonation, Batman uses his aerial craft, the Bat, to haul the bomb far over the bay, where it safely explodes. Before takeoff, Batman kisses Selina and subtly reveals his identity to Gordon.

In the aftermath, Batman and Bruce are both presumed dead, with the former honored as a hero. Wayne Manor becomes an orphanage, and Bruce's estate is left to Alfred. Gordon finds the Bat Signal repaired, while Fox discovers that Bruce fixed the malfunctioning autopilot on the Bat. While vacationing in Florence, Italy, Alfred discovers that Bruce is alive and in a relationship with Selina. Blake resigns from the GCPD and receives a parcel from Bruce, leading to the Batcave.

== Characterization ==
Bruce Wayne is very dedicated to his work of crime-fighting. He sometimes employs illegal and morally dubious tactics, gaining the moniker "The Dark Knight", as opposed to Harvey Dent, who fights crime through legal methods as Gotham's "White Knight" before his transformation into Two-Face.

Bruce's strongest characteristic is his strong moral code: while he often severely injures the criminals he fights, he refuses to kill them, as he believes that doing so would make him no better than them.

Bruce Wayne puts on the façade of a shallow playboy so that no one will take a serious look into his life and discover his secret. As Batman, he employs the image of a monstrous, shadowy, bat-like creature that is not intimidated by criminals and can disappear at will, in order to strike fear into the hearts of criminals and provide the people of Gotham a symbol of hope and justice.

Despite his selfless motives, Bruce Wayne was nonetheless moved by his following among Gotham’s children, as evidenced by the moment he gave his periscope to a boy in the Narrows.

=== Abilities ===
Batman is a highly skilled martial artist, having been trained by Ra's al Ghul in ninjutsu. Batman has achieved such feats as single-handedly subduing a team of trained S.W.A.T. officers and taking out a group of the League of Shadows with minimal injury. Even prior to his training under Ra's, Bruce Wayne is already a skilled street fighter, having learned animal-styled Chinese martial arts (including the Crane, Panther, and Tiger) and Jujutsu, able to fight six convicts (and was subtly implied that five were Ra's men) in a prison brawl, with the guards locking him in solitary for the other inmates' "protection."

During his worldwide travels, Batman has learned to speak other languages including Mandarin Chinese.

Batman is also highly intelligent, being a detective and well-versed in forensics, an expert tactician, and a skilled engineer. He has proven himself good at stealth. With his wealth, Batman has access to cutting-edge technology.

== Character concept and development ==
Batman first appeared in DC Comics stories in 1939 as the writers were adding more costumed superhero characters for the company's lineup. He was first portrayed in film in the 1940s with two film serials from Columbia Pictures: Batman in 1943, and Batman and Robin in 1949, with Lewis Wilson and Robert Lowery portraying the caped crusader in each respective series. In 1966, following the success of the television series on ABC, 20th Century Fox released a film for the series, with Adam West reprising his role from the show as Batman.

After years of waning popularity and development hell for the character, Warner Bros. decided to develop a new Batman film in the mid 1980s, having recently adopted fellow DC Comics character Superman for film with a successful movie in 1978 and subsequent series. Tim Burton was hired as director of the film, which was released in 1989 with Michael Keaton taking on the role of Batman. Following the film's success, Burton made a sequel to the film, Batman Returns, with Keaton reprising his role, but both Burton and Keaton left the franchise after the film's release in 1992, being replaced by Joel Schumacher and Val Kilmer, respectively. Schumacher's additions to Burton's film series, Batman Forever in 1995 and Batman & Robin in 1997 (which saw George Clooney replace Kilmer as Batman), saw mixed-to-negative critical reviews. Following the latter's critical and box office failure, the Batman film series was put in jeopardy.

=== Development of the Dark Knight film series ===
In January 2003, Warner Bros. hired Memento director Christopher Nolan to direct an untitled Batman film, and David S. Goyer signed on to write the script two months later. Nolan stated his intention to reinvent the film franchise of Batman by "doing the origins story of the character, which is a story that's never been told before". Nolan said that humanity and realism would be the basis of the origin film, and that "the world of Batman is that of grounded reality. [It] will be a recognizable, contemporary reality against which an extraordinary heroic figure arises." Goyer said that the goal of the film was to get the audience to care for both Batman and Bruce Wayne. Nolan felt the previous films were exercises in style rather than drama, and described his inspiration as being Richard Donner's 1978 film Superman, in its focus on depicting the character's growth. Also similar to Superman, Nolan wanted an all-star supporting cast for Batman Begins to lend a more epic feel and credibility to the story.

Goyer wanted to reboot the franchise; he and Nolan saw Batman as a romantic character, and Nolan envisioned a large, sweeping film like Lawrence of Arabia. Nolan did not have a problem with the studio's requirement that the film not be R-rated because he wanted to make the film that he wanted to see when 11 years old. His personal "jumping off point" of inspiration was "The Man Who Falls", a short story by Denny O'Neil and Dick Giordano about Bruce's travels throughout the world. The early scene in Batman Begins of young Bruce Wayne falling into a well was adapted from "The Man Who Falls". Batman: The Long Halloween, written by Jeph Loeb and drawn by Tim Sale, influenced Goyer in writing the screenplay, with the villain Carmine Falcone as one of many elements which were drawn from Halloween's "sober, serious approach". The sequel to Halloween, Batman: Dark Victory, also served as a minor influence. Goyer used the vacancy of Bruce Wayne's multi-year absence presented in Batman: Year One to help set up some of the film's events in the transpiring years.

A common idea in the comics is that Bruce saw a Zorro film with his parents before they were murdered. Nolan explained that by ignoring that idea – which he stated is not found in Batman's first appearances – it emphasized the importance of bats to Bruce and that becoming a superhero is a wholly original idea on his part. It is for this reason Nolan believes other DC characters do not exist in the universe of his film; otherwise, Wayne's reasons for taking up costumed vigilantism would have been very different.

=== Casting ===
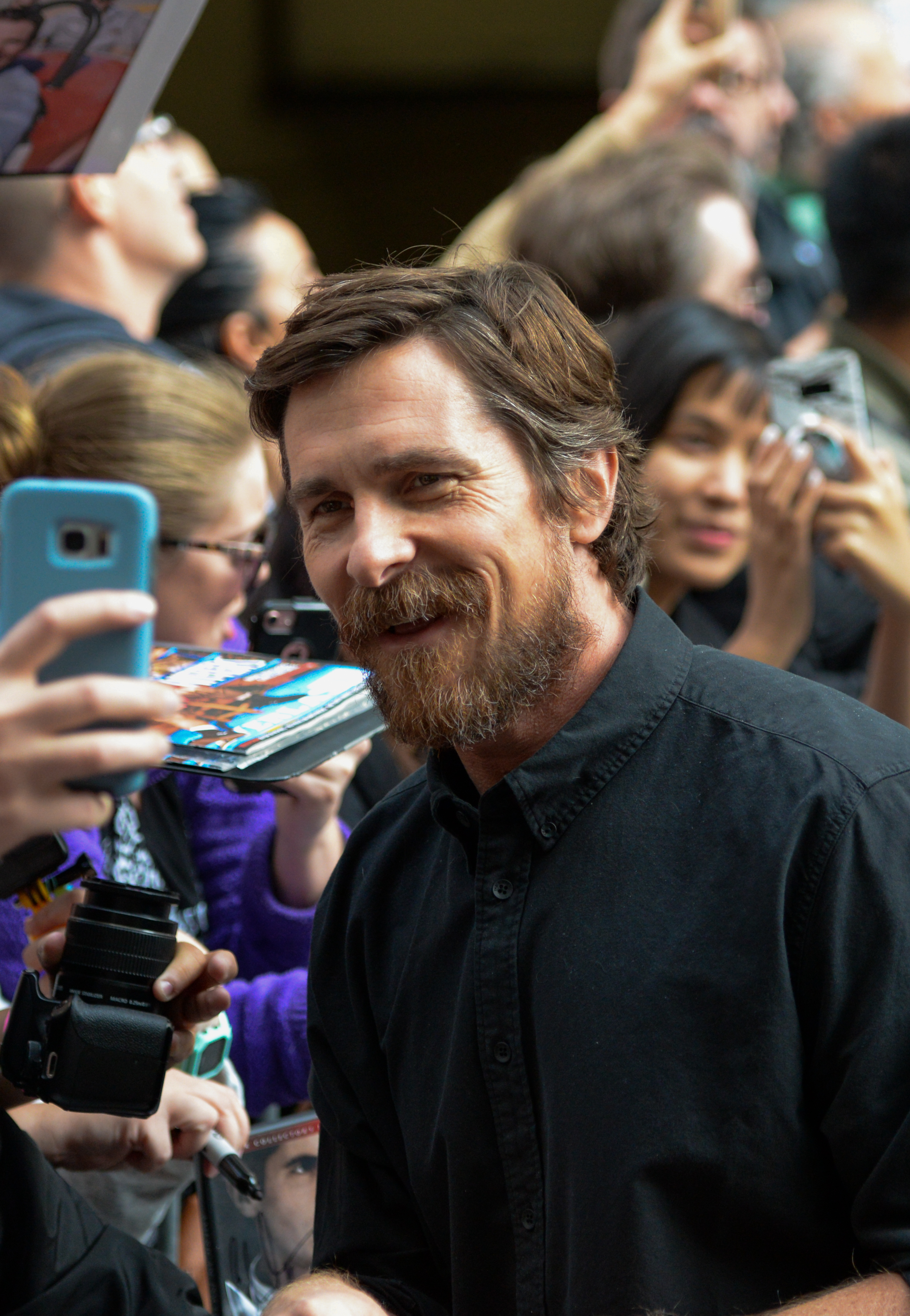
According to Christopher Nolan, Christian Bale had "exactly the balance of darkness and light that we were looking for."

Christian Bale was already an established actor when cast as Bruce Wayne/Batman, but had not yet attained movie star status. Before he was confirmed on September 11, 2003, having expressed interest in the role since Darren Aronofsky was planning his own film adaptation, Eion Bailey, Henry Cavill, Billy Crudup, Hugh Dancy, Jake Gyllenhaal, Joshua Jackson, Heath Ledger, David Boreanaz and Cillian Murphy took interest in it as well. Bale, Bailey and Murphy auditioned using the Batman Forever sonar suit donated by Val Kilmer. Amy Adams served as the casting reader for the casting of Bruce Wayne / Batman in a favor to the casting director. Bale felt the previous Batman films underused Batman's character, emphasizing the villains instead. To inform his characterization, Bale studied graphic novels and illustrations of the superhero. Director Nolan said of Bale, "He has exactly the balance of darkness and light that we were looking for." Goyer stated that while some actors could play a great Bruce Wayne or a great Batman, Bale could portray both radically different personalities.

Bale described the part as playing four characters: the raging Batman persona, the shallow playboy façade Bruce uses to ward off suspicion, the vengeful young man, and the older, angrier Bruce who is discovering his purpose in life. He later reflected on Batman as a "very, very dark, messed-up character." At his audition, Bale wore the Batsuit (minus the cape, which had been missing for some time) Val Kilmer donned for 1995's Batman Forever. Bale's dislike of his costume, which heated up regularly, helped him get into a necessarily foul mood. He said, "Batman's meant to be fierce, and you become a beast in that suit, as Batman should be – not a man in a suit, but a different creature." Since he had lost a great deal of weight in preparation for his role in The Machinist, Bale hired a personal trainer to help him gain 100 pounds (45 kg) of muscle in the span of only a couple of months to help him physically prepare for the role. He first went well over the weight required and created concern over whether he would look right for the part. Bale recognized that his large physique was not appropriate for Batman, who relies on speed and strategy. He lost the excess weight by the time filming began. Bale trained in Wing Chun Kung Fu under Eric Oram in preparation for the movie. Child actor Gus Lewis portrays an 8-year-old Bruce at the beginning of the film.

Bale reprised the role of Batman in the sequel The Dark Knight, released on July 18, 2008. He trained in the Keysi Fighting Method, and performed many of his own stunts. He reprised the role again for the sequel The Dark Knight Rises, released on July 20, 2012. Of all the actors who have portrayed Batman on film, Bale did so for the longest time period. Following a shooting at a midnight showing of The Dark Knight Rises, he visited survivors in an Aurora, Colorado hospital. Despite the success of the Dark Knight trilogy, Bale decided not to return for a potential fourth film appearance as Batman out of respect for Christopher Nolan's creative direction and the fact that the trilogy provided a full arc for the character. However, Bale states that he is open to reprise his role as Batman, if Christopher Nolan agreed to return as director.

=== Voice ===
"Swear to me"
Audio clip from Batman Begins in which Batman (Christian Bale) interrogates a criminal.

Though previous Batman actors Michael Keaton and Kevin Conroy created separate voices for Batman and the unmasked Bruce Wayne, Christian Bale's "Batman voice" is often considered the most memorable live-action rendition and was made famous by the films. Director Christopher Nolan states that "Christian, somehow, figured this out before the screen test, that you could not give a normal performance, that you could not give an ordinary performance. You had to project massive energy through this costume in order to not question the costume. So it's about feeling and a voice, and I think Christian's voice was a big part of the impression he made in the test. He decided that Batman needed to have a different voice than Bruce Wayne; he needed to put on a voice that supported the visual appearance of the character."

The vocalization of Bale's Batman (which was partly altered during post-production) was the subject of particular criticism by some commentators, with David Edelstein of NPR describing Bale delivering his performance with "a voice that's deeper and hammier than ever." Alonso Duralde at MSNBC, however, referred to Bale's voice in The Dark Knight as an "eerie rasp," as opposed to the voice used in Batman Begins, which according to Duralde "sounded absurdly deep, like a 10-year-old putting on an 'adult' voice to make prank phone calls."

=== Batsuits ===
Batman has several bodysuits in the trilogy, with a detailed description given to the one used in Batman Begins. Variations of military-grade body armor are used, with Christian Bale requesting changes made due to a lack of mobility with the first suit used.

== In other media ==
=== Animated film ===
Bruce Wayne/Batman is the subject of Batman: Gotham Knight, an animated anthology film that takes place in the universe of The Dark Knight trilogy and contains six stories, animated by different anime studios. The film is set between the events of Batman Begins and The Dark Knight, though the producers have acknowledged that the plot of the anthology isn't necessarily integral to the main story told within the films. Batman is portrayed fighting against the mobs of Gotham City in addition to other villains such as Deadshot, Scarecrow, and Killer Croc. Batman is voiced by Kevin Conroy, who also voiced the character in a multitude of other Batman projects. The producers originally tried to get Christian Bale to voice the role in the animated shorts, but it was not possible due to scheduling conflicts.

=== Video games ===
Bale's version of Batman was adapted into the video game Batman Begins. The suit from Christopher Nolan's The Dark Knight film was added as an alternate skin to Batman: Arkham Knight during a free update in December 2015.

Bale's version of Batman was added as a purchasable outfit in Fortnite Battle Royale alongside a traditionally designed Batman in September 2019.

== Reception ==
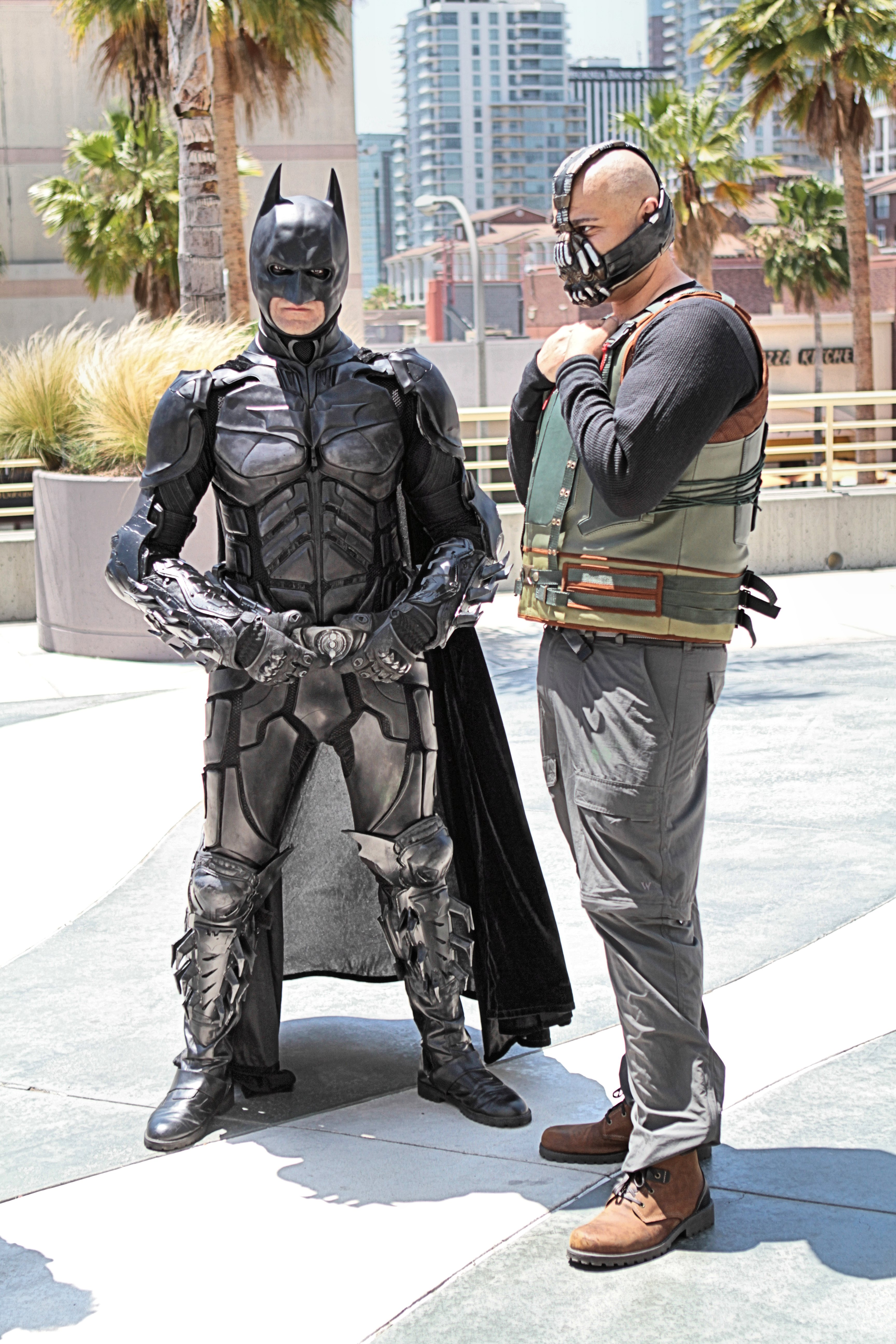
Cosplayers dressed as Christian Bale's Batman and Tom Hardy's Bane as portrayed in The Dark Knight Rises

Christian Bale's portrayal of Batman has received widespread acclaim, even though Bale himself has said he could have given a better performance. Before the premiere of Batman v Superman: Dawn of Justice (which saw Ben Affleck take on the role), The Guardian surveyed the previous Batman actors including Bale and judged him to be the best Batman due to his balanced and realistic portrayal of the character especially in Batman Begins, stating that "Bale gave us a Batman we could believe in, in more ways than one."

To date, The Dark Knight and The Dark Knight Rises are Bale's most financially successful films. The Dark Knight has been regarded as one of the best films of the 2000s. While he was an established actor prior to his casting, Bale gained more international exposure due to his role as Batman. He received numerous award nominations for the role spanning across the three films, including winning Best Actor at the Empire Awards.

== See also ==
- Bruce Wayne (1989 film series character)
- Bruce Wayne (DC Extended Universe)
