= Rachel Dawes =

Character in The Dark Knight Trilogy

- Katie Holmes (left) and Maggie Gyllenhaal (right) as Rachel Dawes in Batman Begins (2005) and The Dark Knight (2008), respectively.
- First appearance: Batman Begins (2005)
- Last appearance: The Dark Knight (2008)
- Created by: Christopher Nolan; David S. Goyer
- Portrayed by: Batman Begins; Katie Holmes (present-day); Emma Lockhart (young); The Dark Knight; Maggie Gyllenhaal
- Voiced by: Katie Holmes (Batman Begins video game)

In-universe information
- Occupation: Assistant district attorney
- Family: Mrs. Dawes (mother)
- Significant other: Harvey Dent
- Home: Gotham City
- Nationality: American

Rachel Dawes is a fictional character who first appeared in Christopher Nolan's 2005 feature film Batman Begins. She was portrayed in that film by Katie Holmes, with Emma Lockhart as a younger version of the character in early scenes. Holmes also voiced the character in the video game adaptation. Maggie Gyllenhaal replaced Holmes in the 2008 sequel The Dark Knight after Holmes chose not to reprise the role. Gyllenhaal also appeared as Dawes on the viral marketing website I Believe in Harvey Dent, giving Harvey Dent her endorsement in the District Attorney election.

In The Dark Knight Trilogy, Rachel is Bruce Wayne's (Christian Bale) childhood sweetheart and one of the few people who truly knows him, and inspires him to improve Gotham City. The conflict between Bruce's love for her and his secret life as Batman is one of the main themes of the first two films in the trilogy, while her death in The Dark Knight partly motivates his actions in the final film, The Dark Knight Rises. Rachel was developed as a combination from three different characters originating from the comics, Julie Madison (a childhood friend of Bruce Wayne's who later becomes his love interest and aware of him being Batman), Silver St. Cloud (a girlfriend of Bruce's who had frictions with his double life), and Gilda/Grace Dent (the wife of Harvey Dent), while sharing the first name of Rachel Caspian from Batman: Year Two.

== Development ==
The writers of Batman Begins originally considered to have Harvey Dent appearing in the film, but the character of Rachel Dawes was created when they realized that they "couldn't do the character justice". Dent ultimately appeared in the sequel The Dark Knight, portrayed by Aaron Eckhart. Rachel is an original character, and was not taken from any of the Batman comics.

Katie Holmes was to reprise as Rachel in The Dark Knight, but turned it down in order to star in Mad Money instead. Before Maggie Gyllenhaal was cast, Emily Blunt and Rachel McAdams were considered to replace Holmes as Rachel. Gyllenhaal has acknowledged that Rachel is a damsel in distress to an extent, but says Nolan sought ways to empower the character, so "Rachel's really clear about what's important to her and unwilling to compromise her morals, which made a nice change" from the many conflicted characters whom she has previously portrayed.

== Fictional character biography ==
=== Batman Begins (2005) ===
Rachel is Bruce Wayne's closest childhood friend. Rachel's mother worked as a domestic servant at Wayne Manor, and the two would often play together on the grounds. After Bruce's parents are murdered by Joe Chill (Richard Brake), Rachel's mother seeks other employment and leaves Wayne Manor with Rachel.

Rachel enrolls in law school and gets an internship at the Gotham City District Attorney's office during her first year. After Chill is murdered for testifying against Mafia boss Carmine Falcone (Tom Wilkinson), Bruce reveals to Rachel that he intended to murder Chill himself, and is angry that he was deprived of revenge. Rachel is horrified and slaps Bruce, telling him that his late parents would be ashamed of him. She also takes Bruce down to the slums and shows him that Falcone's criminal empire has worsened the poverty created by Gotham's economic depression, and states that every day more people just like Chill turn to crime out of desperation. Soon afterward, Bruce leaves the United States and Rachel continues her studies in law school. Years later, she becomes an assistant district attorney working for District Attorney Carl Finch (Larry Holden).

Rachel dedicates her life and career to eliminating crime in Gotham, in the process making enemies of Falcone and later Dr. Jonathan Crane (Cillian Murphy), Arkham Asylum's corrupt chief psychiatrist. When Bruce returns to Gotham, Rachel is surprised that he did not contact her, and later feels disappointed in him, taking his playboy façade at face value. Around the same time, a costumed vigilante calling himself Batman appears in Gotham, and saves Rachel from Falcone's assassins. Rachel is intrigued by the masked crime-fighter, unaware that he is her old friend Bruce.

After Finch is murdered by Crane's thugs, Rachel takes over his job until a replacement can be found. Shortly afterward, Falcone has a psychotic break in police custody, and Rachel believes he is faking it to avoid trial, unaware that Crane drugged him with his fear toxin. When she goes to Arkham to evaluate the situation, Crane drugs her with fear toxin as well. Batman rescues her again, administers an antidote and tells her that Crane is working with the League of Shadows, a terrorist organization led by Ra's al Ghul (Liam Neeson). He gives her instructions for a plan to save the city from the League's attack. He then sedates her and has his butler, Alfred Pennyworth (Michael Caine), take her home. She wakes up in her bed and delivers samples of an anti-toxin to Gotham City Police Department sergeant James Gordon (Gary Oldman).

The League starts a riot in the Narrows, one of Gotham City's slums, and Rachel is trapped. Crane, who has now assumed the criminal alter ego of "The Scarecrow", attacks her again. She defends herself and a boy caught in the riot by firing a taser at Crane's face, driving him away. Soon, the city is overrun by Arkham's inmates, whom the League has released, and Rachel and the boy are surrounded by lunatics led by Falcone's henchman, Victor Zsasz (Tim Booth). Batman saves them at the last minute and gives Rachel a hint as to his secret identity.

Towards the end of the film, Rachel visits the remains of Wayne Manor, finding Bruce and Alfred sorting through the wreckage. She and Bruce share a kiss, but she tells him that they cannot be together until Gotham no longer needs Batman, now fully aware of his secret. At the end of the movie's novelization, she is named interim District Attorney.

=== The Dark Knight (2008) ===
By the start of the second film, Rachel is in a relationship with newly elected District Attorney Harvey Dent (Aaron Eckhart), creating a love triangle between him, herself, and Bruce Wayne. Dent asks Rachel to marry him, but she does not have a clear answer, being torn between her love for both men.

At one point, the Joker (Heath Ledger) attacks Rachel at Dent's fundraiser, holding her at knifepoint. Batman arrives and fights off the Joker's men, but the Joker grabs Rachel and throws her from the skyscraper window. Batman jumps out the window after her, breaking their fall on a car below.

Rachel is next seen at the funeral of police commissioner Gillian Loeb (Colin MacFarlane), who was murdered by the Joker. At the funeral, the Joker attempts to assassinate Mayor Anthony Garcia (Nestor Carbonell), and leaves behind evidence indicating that Rachel will be next. Rachel takes shelter in Bruce's penthouse at Dent's insistence, and she and Bruce briefly rekindle their romance. He admits that he desires to turn himself in as Batman and hopes they could eventually be together, which Rachel says cannot happen if he goes to prison. Dent holds a press conference and claims to be Batman. Rachel is disappointed that Bruce would let Dent take the fall for him, and gives Alfred a letter to be delivered to Bruce "when the time is right." She promptly leaves the penthouse.

After Batman and Gordon capture the Joker, Rachel and Dent are kidnapped by police officers on mob boss Sal Maroni's (Eric Roberts) payroll, who are working under the Joker's orders. Batman interrogates the Joker and learns that the lives of both Dent and Rachel are at stake. The Joker tells Batman that he must choose which one of them to save and gives him both locations. Batman goes to save Rachel, while Gordon and several GCPD officers go to save Dent; they are unaware that the Joker switched the addresses. Both Rachel and Dent are tied up in rooms surrounded with gasoline drums and remote-controlled explosives, with phones attached so they can talk to each other. Rachel tells Dent that she wants to marry him. Batman arrives at Dent's location in time to save him, but Gordon arrives at the other too late, and Rachel dies when the building explodes. Driven insane with grief, a severely disfigured Dent becomes the murderous vigilante Two-Face and seeks revenge on those he holds responsible for Rachel's death.

Upon Rachel's death, Alfred reads her note in which she reveals that she intends to marry Dent. She explains that while Gotham may come to no longer need Batman, she now knows that the day when Bruce no longer does will never come. When Bruce relates to Alfred that his only solace is the knowledge that she would have waited for him, Alfred decides to burn the note, sparing Bruce the pain of the truth.

=== The Dark Knight Rises (2012) ===
Rachel is mentioned several times throughout The Dark Knight Rises. Additionally, a picture of her appears in Wayne Manor (Maggie Gyllenhaal’s archival portrayal of the character in The Dark Knight only). Bruce, having retired from being Batman after taking the blame for Dent's crimes to ensure he is remembered as a hero, is portrayed as still mourning Rachel eight years after her death, rarely leaving Wayne Manor. Despite being dejected over his loss, Bruce meets and is attracted to two women who resemble Rachel: Wayne Enterprises CEO Miranda Tate (Marion Cotillard) and cat burglar Selina Kyle (Anne Hathaway).

When Bane (Tom Hardy) attacks Gotham, Bruce decides to become Batman once more to save the city. In an attempt to stop him, Alfred finally confesses to Bruce that Rachel chose Dent and that he burned her letter in order to spare Bruce pain. Despite this, Bruce makes efforts to move on from Rachel when he and Tate spend the night together, but is heartbroken yet again when she is revealed to be Ra's al Ghul's daughter, Talia, who is working with Bane to fulfill her father's mission of destroying Gotham City. Bruce also shares a flirtatious relationship with Kyle throughout the film that develops into love. By the end of the film, Bruce and Selina, who faked their deaths to leave Gotham, have begun a relationship, and Bruce has passed his legacy as Gotham's protector to John Blake (Joseph Gordon-Levitt) so he can finally get on with his life.
