= Batman Begins =

2005 film by Christopher Nolan

- Theatrical release poster
- Directed by: Christopher Nolan
- Screenplay by: Christopher Nolan; David S. Goyer
- Story by: David S. Goyer
- Based on: Characters appearing in comic books published by DC Comics
- Produced by: Charles Roven; Emma Thomas; Larry Franco
- Starring: Christian Bale; Michael Caine; Liam Neeson; Katie Holmes; Gary Oldman; Cillian Murphy; Tom Wilkinson; Rutger Hauer; Ken Watanabe; Morgan Freeman
- Cinematography: Wally Pfister
- Edited by: Lee Smith
- Music by: Hans Zimmer; James Newton Howard
- Production companies: Warner Bros. Pictures; Syncopy; Patalex III Productions
- Distributed by: Warner Bros. Pictures
- Release dates: May 31, 2005 (Tokyo); June 15, 2005 (United States); June 17, 2005 (United Kingdom)
- Running time: 140 minutes
- Countries: United States; United Kingdom
- Language: English
- Budget: $150 million
- Box office: $375.6 million

Batman Begins is a 2005 superhero film based on the DC Comics character Batman. Directed by Christopher Nolan, who co-wrote the screenplay with David S. Goyer, the film stars Christian Bale as Bruce Wayne / Batman, with Michael Caine, Liam Neeson, Katie Holmes, Gary Oldman, Cillian Murphy, Tom Wilkinson, Rutger Hauer, Ken Watanabe, and Morgan Freeman in supporting roles. The film reboots the Batman film series, telling the origin story of Bruce Wayne (Bale) from the death of his parents to his journey to become Batman and his fight to stop Ra's al Ghul (Neeson) and the Scarecrow (Murphy) from plunging Gotham City into chaos.

After Batman & Robin (1997) was panned by critics and underperformed at the box office, Warner Bros. Pictures cancelled future Batman films, including Joel Schumacher's planned Batman Unchained. Between 1998 and 2003, several filmmakers collaborated with Warner Bros. in attempting to reboot the franchise. After the studio rejected a Batman origin story reboot Joss Whedon pitched in December 2002, Warner Bros. hired Nolan in January 2003 to direct a new film. Nolan and Goyer began development on the film in early 2003. Aiming for a darker, more realistic tone compared to the previous films, a primary goal for their vision was to engage the audience's emotional investment in both the Batman and Bruce Wayne identities of the lead character. The film, which was principally shot in the United Kingdom, Iceland and Chicago, relied heavily on traditional stunts and miniature effects, with computer-generated imagery being used in a minimal capacity compared to other action films. Comic book storylines such as The Man Who Falls, Batman: Year One, and Batman: The Long Halloween served as inspiration.

Expectations for Batman Begins ranged from moderate to low, which originated from the poor reception of Batman & Robin that was credited with stalling the Batman film series in 1997. After premiering in Tokyo on May 31, 2005, the film was released in the United States on June 15. The film received positive reviews and ended up grossing over $375.6 million worldwide against a $150 million budget, becoming the ninth highest-grossing film of 2005, and was the second highest grossing Batman film at the time of its release, behind Tim Burton's Batman (1989). Receiving a nomination for the Academy Award for Best Cinematography, the film elevated Bale to leading man status while it made Nolan a high-profile director.

Since its release, Batman Begins has often been cited as one of the most influential films of the 2000s. The film helped popularize the term reboot in Hollywood, inspiring studios and filmmakers to revive franchises with realistic and serious tones. It was followed by the sequels The Dark Knight (2008) and The Dark Knight Rises (2012), which rounded out The Dark Knight trilogy.

== Plot ==
In Gotham City, young Bruce Wayne falls down a well and develops a fear of bats. One evening, Bruce visits the opera with his parents; the performers masquerading as bats upset him, and he asks to leave. As the Waynes leave the theater, a mugger named Joe Chill attempts to rob Bruce's parents and shoots them dead. Police sergeant Jim Gordon comforts the orphaned Bruce. The Gotham police capture Chill, who is sent to prison for his crime. Bruce is raised by the family butler, Alfred Pennyworth.

Fourteen years later, Chill testifies against mafia crime boss Carmine Falcone, and is paroled. Bruce intends to murder Chill to avenge his parents, but an assassin in Falcone's employ kills him first. Bruce's childhood friend, Rachel Dawes, confronts him about his desire for vengeance. After confronting Falcone, who says real power comes from being feared, Bruce spends the next seven years traveling the world, training in combat, and immersing himself in the criminal underworld. In a Bhutan prison, Bruce is approached by Henri Ducard, who recruits him into the League of Shadows, led by Ra's al Ghul. Ducard trains Bruce to conquer his fear using a hallucinogenic compound derived from the mountain's blue flowers. After completing his training, Bruce rejects the League's mandate for capital punishment and learns they plan to destroy Gotham, which Ra's believes is corrupt beyond saving. Bruce escapes after burning the League's temple; Ra's is killed by falling debris, while Bruce saves an unconscious Ducard.

Intent on fighting crime and redeeming Gotham, Bruce returns to Gotham, Alfred, and his family's company, Wayne Enterprises, which is being taken public by businessman William Earle. Company archivist Lucius Fox, a friend of Bruce's father, allows him access to prototype defense technologies, including a protective bodysuit and the Tumbler, an armored vehicle. Finding the well from his childhood, Bruce explores further, discovering a vast cave underneath Wayne Manor. Bruce poses publicly as a shallow playboy while taking up the vigilante identity of "Batman", inspired by his childhood fear.

Intercepting a drug shipment, Batman provides Rachel, now an assistant district attorney, with evidence against Falcone and enlists Gordon, one of Gotham's few honest police officers, to arrest him. In prison, Falcone meets with Dr. Jonathan Crane, a corrupt psychologist with whom Falcone has been smuggling drugs into Gotham. Falcone threatens to inform the police about a secret compound in the drugs unless Crane's mysterious employer cuts a deal with him. Donning a scarecrow mask, Crane sprays Falcone with a fear-inducing hallucinogen, driving him insane. While investigating Crane, Batman is sprayed with the hallucinogen. He awakens on his birthday, having been saved by Alfred and Fox, who developed an antidote for the toxin.

Rachel confronts Crane, who reveals the drug has been introduced into Gotham's water supply and gives her a potentially lethal dose. Batman captures Crane, who claims to work for Ra's al Ghul. Evading the police in the Tumbler, Batman saves Rachel and administers Fox's antidote. He gives her two antidote vials: one for Gordon, and one for mass production. At Bruce's birthday party, Ducard reveals himself as the true Ra's al Ghul, who employed Crane to weaponize the League's blue flower compound. Having stolen a powerful microwave emitter from Wayne Enterprises, Ra's plans to vaporize Gotham's water supply, rendering Crane's drug airborne and causing mass hysteria that will destroy the city. He burns down Wayne Manor, but Alfred rescues Bruce.

The League of Shadows releases Crane and the other Arkham inmates into the Narrows, a poverty-ridden district of Gotham. Rachel enters the Narrows and finds Gordon, but the police isolate the district. Ra's loads the emitter onto Gotham's monorail to release the drug at the city's central water source under Wayne Tower. Rachel is attacked by Crane but fends him off with a taser. As the gas strikes the Narrows, Rachel, the inoculated Gordon, and Batman struggle to survive. Batman reveals his identity to Rachel before fighting Ra's on the train. Gordon uses the Tumbler's cannons to destroy the monorail's track and Batman glides from the train as it derails and crashes, killing Ra's.

Rachel now respects Bruce but refuses to be with him, promising they can be together when Gotham no longer needs Batman. Batman becomes a public hero. After purchasing a controlling stake in Wayne Enterprises, Bruce fires Earle and replaces him with Fox. Gordon is promoted to Lieutenant, shows Batman the Bat-Signal, and tells him about a criminal who leaves behind Joker playing cards. (Note: Identified off-screen as the Joker.) Batman glides away into the night to investigate.

== Cast ==
- Christian Bale as Bruce Wayne / Batman:
  A billionaire socialite who, after witnessing his parents' death in a mugging at age 8, travels around the world seven years before returning home to inherit his family company Wayne Enterprises whilst operating at night as a bat-masked vigilante bringing justice upon the criminal underworld of Gotham City. Bale was relatively unknown when cast. Before he was confirmed on September 11, 2003, having expressed interest in the role since Darren Aronofsky was planning his own film adaptation, Eion Bailey, Henry Cavill, who would later be cast as Superman, Billy Crudup, Hugh Dancy, Jake Gyllenhaal, Joshua Jackson, David Boreanaz, Heath Ledger, who later played the Joker in The Dark Knight, and Cillian Murphy, who would later be cast as Dr. Jonathan Crane / Scarecrow, took interest in it as well. While still attached to the project, Aronofsky revealed in a 2020 interview for Empire magazine that he wanted Joaquin Phoenix for the role, but the studio wanted Freddie Prinze Jr. instead. Josh Hartnett met with Nolan about the role, but decided against pursuing it. Bale, Bailey and Murphy auditioned using the Batman Forever sonar suit donated by Val Kilmer, but the cape was lost, and Amy Adams served as the casting reader for the casting of Bruce Wayne / Batman in a favor to the casting director.
  Though his friends doubted him stating it was not going to work, Bale was convinced by Nolan's approach and he felt that the previous films underused Batman's character, overplaying the villains instead. To best pose as Batman, Bale studied graphic novels and illustrations of the superhero. Director Nolan said of Bale, "He has exactly the balance of darkness and light that we were looking for." Goyer stated that while some actors could play a great Bruce Wayne or a great Batman, Bale could portray both radically different personalities. Since he had lost a great deal of weight in preparation for his role in The Machinist, Bale hired a personal trainer to help him gain 100 pounds (45 kg) of muscle in the span of only a couple of months to help him physically prepare for the role. After realizing he went over by 30 pounds (14 kg), he lost the excess weight by the time filming began. Bale trained in Wing Chun Kung Fu under Eric Oram in preparation for the movie.
  - Gus Lewis as Young Bruce Wayne.
- Michael Caine as Alfred Pennyworth:
  A trusted butler to Bruce's parents, who continues his loyal service to their son after their deaths as his closest confidant. Nolan offered the role to Anthony Hopkins but he declined. Nolan went to Caine's country home to personally deliver him the script, telling what his role would be and describing Alfred as "Batman's godfather". Nolan felt Caine would effectively portray the foster father element of the character. Although Alfred is depicted in the film as having served the Wayne family for generations, Caine created his own backstory, in that before becoming the Waynes' butler, Alfred served in the Special Air Service. After being wounded, he was invited to the position of the Wayne family butler by Thomas Wayne because, "He wanted a butler, but someone a bit tougher than that, you know?"
- Liam Neeson as Henri Ducard / Ra's al Ghul:
  The leader of the League of Shadows, an ancient society that uses chaos to punish the corrupt and decadent, who goes undercover as an associate of the League and trains Bruce in martial arts, later revealing himself in the film's climax. Writer David Goyer said he felt he was the most complex of all the Batman villains, comparing him to Osama bin Laden; "He's not crazy in the way that all the other Batman villains are. He's not bent on revenge; he's actually trying to heal the world. He's just doing it by very draconian means." Gary Oldman was the first choice for the part, but ended up playing James Gordon instead. Guy Pearce, who collaborated with Christopher Nolan on Memento (2000), reported that the pair had discussions about him playing the role, but both of them decided that he was too young for the part. Viggo Mortensen was also considered for the role. Neeson is commonly cast as a mentor, so the revelation that his character was the main villain was intended to shock viewers.
- Katie Holmes as Rachel Dawes:
  Bruce's childhood friend and love interest who serves as Gotham City's assistant district attorney and fights against corruption in the city of Gotham. Nolan found a "tremendous warmth and great emotional appeal" in Holmes, and also felt "she has a maturity beyond her years that comes across in the film and is essential to the idea that Rachel is something of a moral conscience for Bruce".
  - Emma Lockhart as Young Rachel Dawes.
- Gary Oldman as James "Jim" Gordon:
  One of the few uncorrupted Gotham City police officers, who is on duty the night of the murder of Bruce's parents and, in this way, shares a special bond with the adult Bruce and thus with Batman. Oldman was Nolan's first choice for Ra's al Ghul, but when Chris Cooper turned down the part of Gordon to spend time with his family, Nolan decided that it would be refreshing for Oldman, who is renowned for his portrayals of villains, to play the role instead. Speaking of his role as Gordon, Oldman explained, "I embody the themes of the movie which are the values of family, courage and compassion and a sense of right and wrong, good and bad and justice". He filmed most of his scenes in Britain. Goyer said Oldman heavily resembled Gordon as drawn by David Mazzucchelli in Batman: Year One.
- Cillian Murphy as Dr. Jonathan Crane / Scarecrow:
  A corrupt psychopharmacologist working as the chief administrator of Arkham Asylum. A specialist in the psychology of fear, he has secretly created a fear-inducing toxin and plots with Ra's al Ghul to expose the entire Gotham population. Nolan decided against casting an Irish actor like Murphy for Batman, before casting him as Scarecrow. Murphy read numerous comics featuring the Scarecrow and discussed making the character look less theatrical with Nolan. Murphy explained, "I wanted to avoid the Worzel Gummidge look, because he's not a very physically imposing man – he's more interested in the manipulation of the mind and what that can do." Robert Downey Jr. was considered for the role.
- Tom Wilkinson as Carmine Falcone:
  The most powerful Mafia boss in Gotham, who shares a prison cell with Joe Chill after he murdered Bruce's parents. Later, after having Chill murdered for his decision to testify against their relationship, he goes into business with Dr. Jonathan Crane and Ra's al Ghul by smuggling in Crane's fear toxins through his drug shipments over the course of several months so that they can be mixed in with the city's water supply.
- Rutger Hauer as William Earle:
  The CEO of Wayne Enterprises, who takes the company public in Bruce's long-term absence.
- Ken Watanabe as decoy Ra's al Ghul:
  A member of the League of Shadows assigned to impersonate Ra's al Ghul during Bruce's training.
- Morgan Freeman as Lucius Fox:
  A high-ranking Wayne Enterprises employee demoted to working in the company's Applied Science Division, where he conducts advanced studies in biochemistry and mechanical engineering and supplies Bruce with much of the gear necessary to carry out Batman's mission. He is promoted to CEO when Bruce takes control of the company by the end of the film.

Other cast members include Mark Boone Junior as Arnold Flass, Gordon's corrupt partner; Linus Roache as Thomas Wayne, Bruce's late father; Larry Holden as district attorney Carl Finch; Colin McFarlane as Gillian B. Loeb, the police commissioner; Christine Adams as Jessica, William Earle's secretary; Vincent Wong as an old Asian prisoner; Sara Stewart as Martha Wayne, Bruce's late mother; Richard Brake as Joe Chill, the Waynes' killer; Gerard Murphy as the corrupt High Court Judge Faden; Charles Edwards as a Wayne Enterprises executive; Tim Booth as Victor Zsasz; Rade Šerbedžija as a homeless man, who is the last person to meet Bruce when he leaves Gotham City, and the first civilian to see Batman; Catherine Porter as an assassin posing as a reporter, who kills Chill under Falcone's orders; Risteárd Cooper and Andrew Pleavin as uniformed policemen; Jo Martin as a police prison official; and Shane Rimmer and Jeremy Theobald (the star and co-producer of Nolan's 1998 film Following) as Gotham Water Board technicians. Jack Gleeson, who had previously co-starred with Bale in 2002's Reign of Fire and later found fame for his role as Joffrey Baratheon in the HBO series Game of Thrones, appears as a young admirer of Batman who is later saved by him from Ra's al Ghul's men; Gleeson was cast at Bale's recommendation. Actors John Foo, Joey Ansah, Spencer Wilding, Dave Legeno, Khan Bonfils, Mark Strange, Grant Guirey, Rodney Ryan, and Dean Alexandrou portray members of the League of Shadows. Hayden Nickel made his acting debut portraying James Gordon Jr.

== Production ==
=== Development ===
After the success of Spider-Man (2002), Warner Bros. Pictures felt they ought to get "their big guys of the bench" and wanted to refresh and invigorate the Batman franchise. In January 2003, Memento director Christopher Nolan was hired by Warner Bros. Pictures to direct an untitled Batman film, and David S. Goyer signed on to write the script two months later. Nolan stated his intention to reinvent the film franchise of Batman by "doing the origins story of the character, which is a story that's never been told before". Nolan said that humanity and realism would be the basis of the origin film, and that "the world of Batman is that of grounded reality. [It] will be a recognizable, contemporary reality against which an extraordinary heroic figure arises." Goyer said that the goal of the film was to get the audience to care for both Batman and Bruce Wayne. Nolan felt the previous films were exercises in style rather than drama, and described his inspiration as being Richard Donner's 1978 film Superman, in its focus on depicting the character's growth. Also similar to Superman, Nolan wanted an all-star supporting cast for Batman Begins to lend a more epic feel and credibility to the story.

Goyer wanted to reboot the franchise; he and Nolan saw Batman as a romantic character, and Nolan envisioned a large, sweeping film like Lawrence of Arabia. Although Warner Bros. required the film not be R-rated, Nolan did not have a problem with this, as he wanted to make the film that he wanted to see when he was 11 years old. His personal "jumping off point" of inspiration was "The Man Who Falls", a short story by Denny O'Neil and Dick Giordano about Bruce's travels throughout the world. The early scene in Batman Begins of young Bruce Wayne falling into a well was adapted from "The Man Who Falls". Batman: The Long Halloween, written by Jeph Loeb and drawn by Tim Sale, influenced Goyer in writing the screenplay, with the villain Carmine Falcone as one of many elements which were drawn from Halloween's "sober, serious approach". The writers considered having Harvey Dent in the film, but replaced him with the new character Rachel Dawes when they realized they "couldn't do him justice". Dent was later portrayed by Aaron Eckhart in the 2008 sequel The Dark Knight. The sequel to Halloween, Batman: Dark Victory, also served as a minor influence. Goyer used the vacancy of Bruce Wayne's multi-year absence presented in Batman: Year One to help set up some of the film's events in the transpiring years. In addition, the film's Sergeant James "Jim" Gordon was based on his comic book incarnation as seen in Year One. The writers of Batman Begins also used Frank Miller's Year One plot device, which was about a corrupt police force that led to Gordon and Gotham City's need for Batman. Due to Batman's extensive rogues gallery over seventy years, Goyer and Nolan decided to use the Scarecrow and Ra's al Ghul as the film's villains, as both characters had not been featured in previous Batman films nor in Adam West's 1960s television series.

A common idea in the comics is that Bruce saw a Zorro film with his parents before they were murdered. Nolan explained that by ignoring that idea – which he stated is not found in Batman's first appearances – it emphasized the importance of bats to Bruce and that becoming a superhero is a wholly original idea on his part. It is for this reason Nolan believes other DC characters do not exist in the universe of his film; otherwise, Wayne's reasons for taking up costumed vigilantism would have been very different.

=== Filming ===
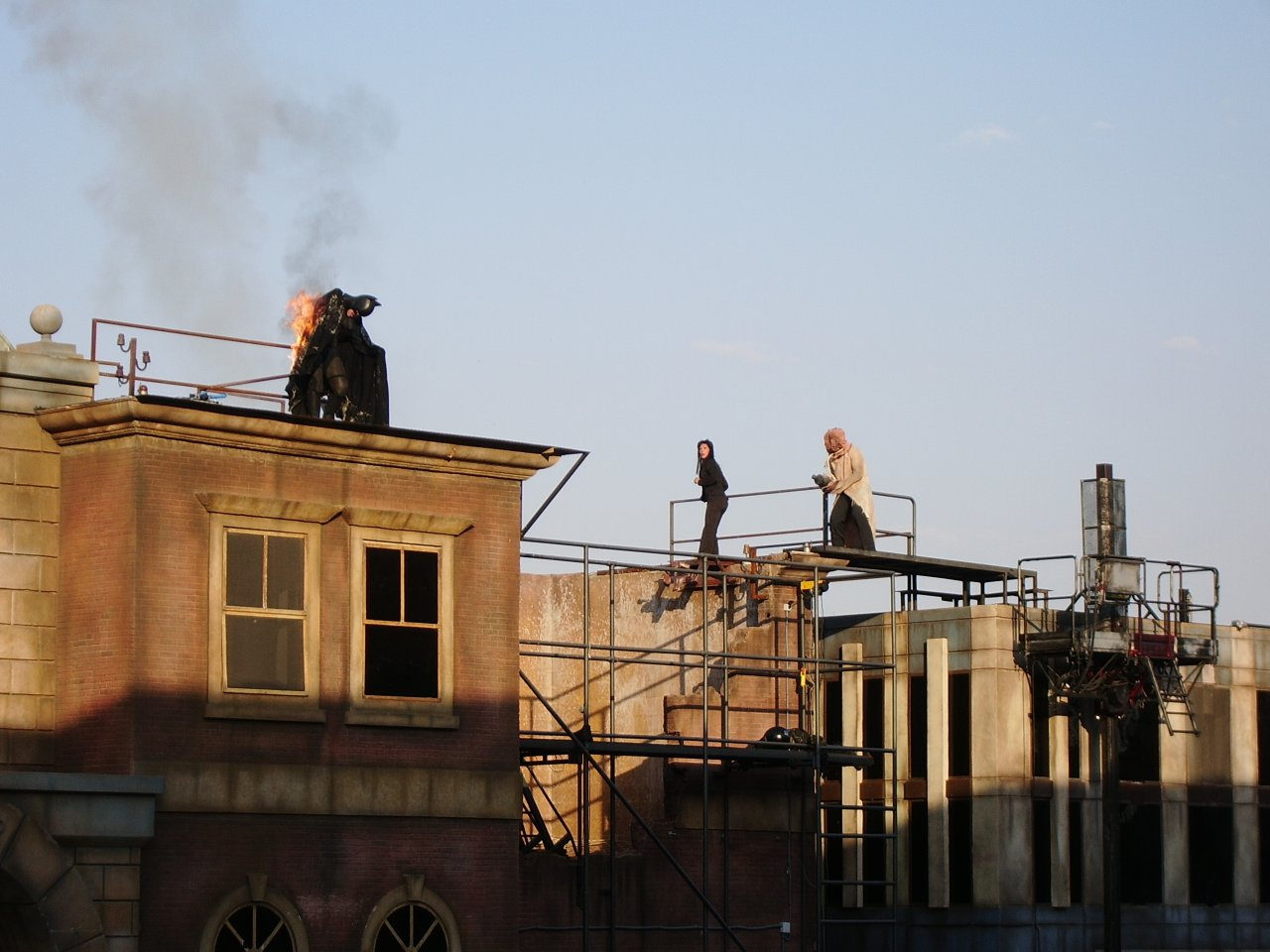
Batman Begins scene where Batman burns

As with all his films, Nolan refused a second unit; he did this in order to keep his vision consistent. Filming began in March 2004 in the Vatnajökull glacier in Iceland (standing in for Bhutan). The crew built a village and the front doors to Ra's' temple, as well as a road to access the remote area. The weather was problematic, with 75 miles per hour (120 km/h) winds, rain, and a lack of snow. A shot that cinematographer Wally Pfister had planned to take using a crane had to be completed with a handheld camera.

Unlike Burton and Schumacher's Gotham City that did not exist in the real world, Nolan shot exteriors in London, New York, and Chicago as he wanted the city to seem recognizable. In seeking inspiration from Superman and other blockbuster films of the late 1970s and early 1980s, Nolan based most of the production in England, specifically Shepperton Studios. A Batcave set was built there and measured 250 feet (76 m) long, 120 feet (37 m) wide, and 40 feet (12 m) high. Production designer Nathan Crowley installed twelve pumps to create a waterfall with 12,000 imperial gallons (55,000 L; 14,000 US gal), and built rocks using molds of real caves. An airship hangar at Cardington, Bedfordshire was rented by Warner Bros. during April 2004 and, converted into a 900 feet (270 m) sound stage, was where the slum-district of "the Narrows" and the feet of the monorails were filmed.

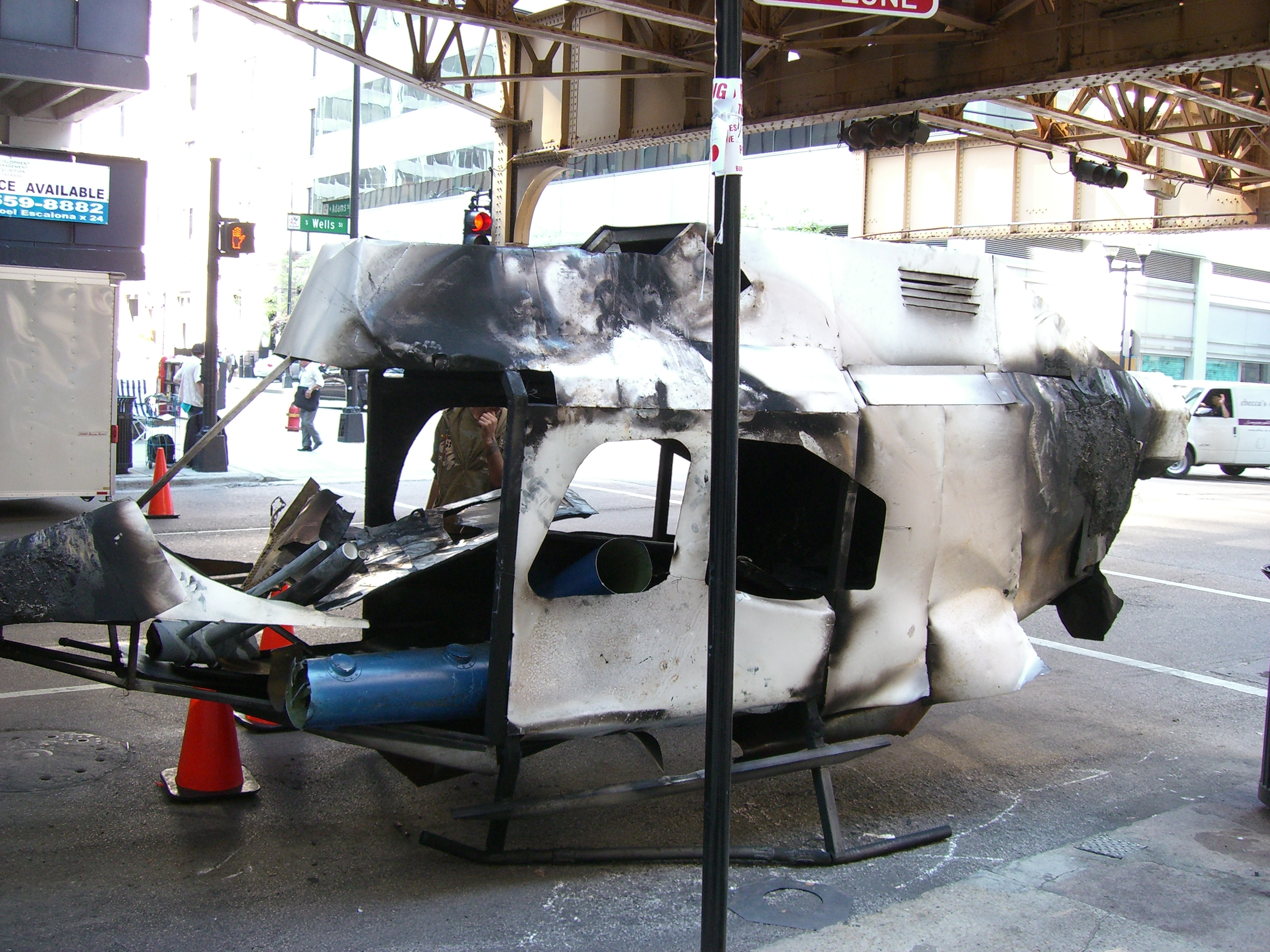
Burnt helicopter prop used in the film

Mentmore Towers was chosen from twenty different locations for Wayne Manor, as Nolan and Crowley liked its white floors, which gave the impression of the manor as a memorial to Wayne's parents. The building chosen to represent Arkham Asylum was the National Institute for Medical Research building in Mill Hill, northwest London, England. The St Pancras railway station and the Abbey Mills Pumping Stations were used for Arkham's interiors. The Senate House of University College London was used for courtrooms. Some scenes, including the Tumbler pursuit, were filmed in Chicago at locations such as Lower Wacker Drive and 35 East Wacker. Authorities agreed to raise Franklin Street Bridge for a scene where access to the Narrows is closed.

Despite the film's darkness, Nolan wanted to make the film appeal to a wide age range. "Not the youngest kids obviously, I think what we've done is probably a bit intense for them but I certainly didn't want to exclude the sort of ten to 12-year olds, because as a kid I would have loved to have seen a movie like this." Because of this, nothing gory or bloody was filmed.

=== Music ===
The score for Batman Begins was composed by Hans Zimmer and James Newton Howard. Nolan originally invited Zimmer to compose the music, and Zimmer asked Nolan if he could invite Howard to compose as well, as they had always planned a collaboration. The two composers collaborated on separate themes for the "split personality" of Bruce Wayne and his alter ego, Batman. Zimmer and Howard began composing in Los Angeles and moved to London where they stayed for twelve weeks to complete most of their writing. Zimmer and Howard sought inspiration for shaping the score by visiting the Batman Begins sets.

Zimmer wanted to avoid writing music that had been done in earlier Batman films, so the score became an amalgamation of orchestra and electronic music. The film's ninety-piece orchestra was developed from members of various London orchestras, and Zimmer chose to use more than the normal number of cellos. Zimmer enlisted a boy soprano to help reflect the music in some of the film's scenes where tragic memories of Bruce Wayne's parents are involved. "He's singing a fairly pretty tune and then he gets stuck, it's like froze, arrested development," said Zimmer. He also attempted to add a human dimension to Batman, whose behavior would typically be seen as "psychotic", through the music. Both composers collaborated to create 2 hours and 20 minutes worth of music for the film, with Zimmer composing the action sequences and Howard focusing on the dramatic scenes.

== Special effects and design ==
=== Design ===
Nolan used the 1982 science fiction film Blade Runner as a source of inspiration for Batman Begins. He screened Blade Runner to Pfister and two others to show the attitude and style that he wanted to draw from the film. Nolan described the film's world as "an interesting lesson on the technique of exploring and describing a credible universe that doesn't appear to have any boundaries", a lesson that he applied to the production of Batman Begins.

Nolan worked with production designer Nathan Crowley to create the look of Gotham City. Crowley built a model of the city that filled Nolan's garage. Crowley and Nolan designed it as a large, modern metropolitan area that would reflect the various periods of architecture that the city had gone through. Elements were drawn from New York City, Chicago, and Tokyo; the latter for its elevated freeways and monorails. The Narrows was based on the slummish nature of the (now demolished) walled city of Kowloon in Hong Kong.

=== Tumbler ===
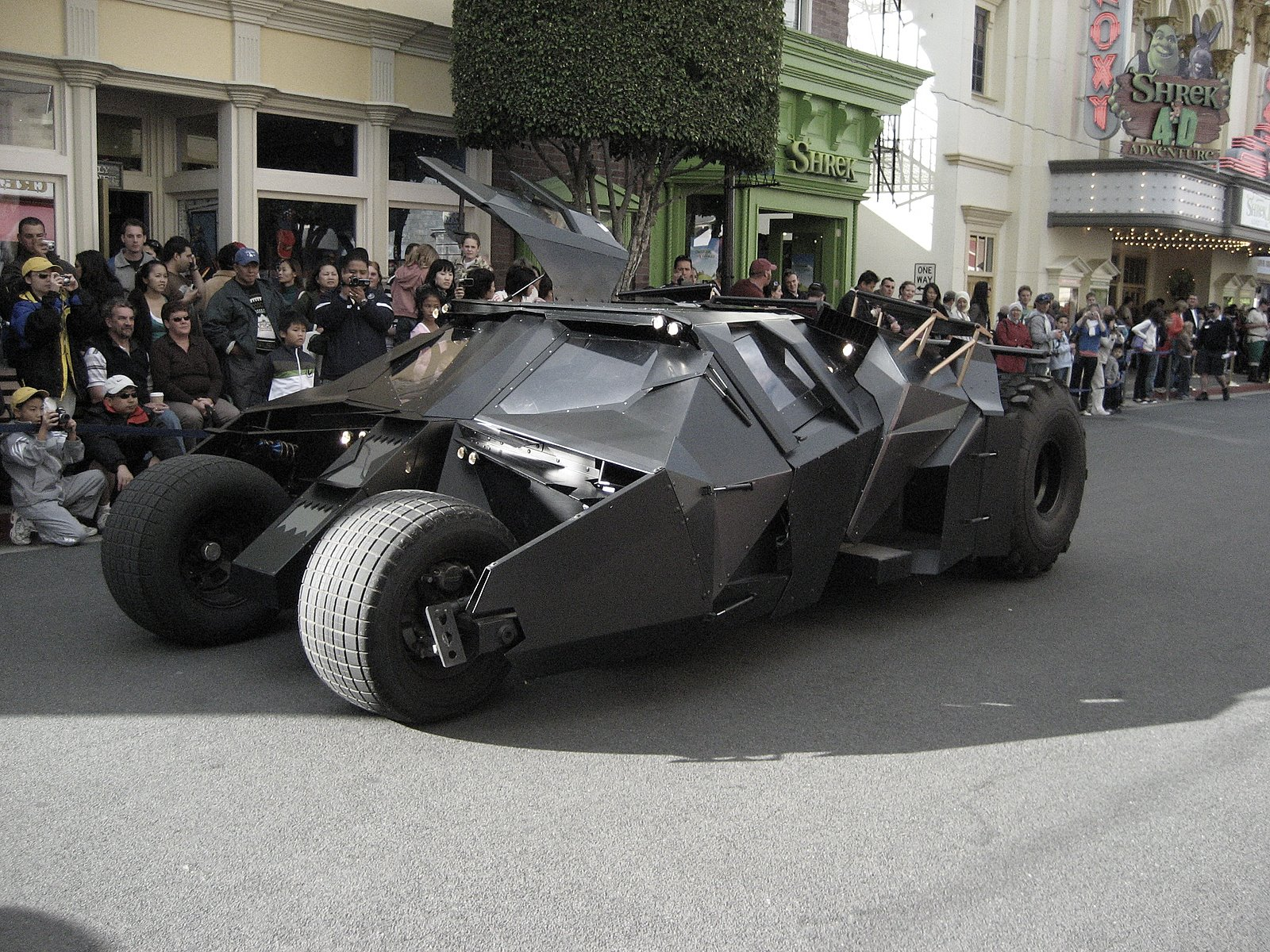
The Tumbler used in the film

Crowley started the process of designing the Tumbler for the film by model bashing. Crowley used the nose cone of a P-38 Lightning model to serve as the chassis for the Tumbler's turbine engine. Six models of the Tumbler were built to 1:12 scale in the course of four months. Following the scale model creation, a crew of over 30 people, including Crowley and engineers Chris Culvert and Annie Smith, carved a full-size replica of the Tumbler out of a large block of Styrofoam in two months.

The styrofoam model was used to create a steel "test frame", which had to stand up to several standards: have a speed of over 100 miles per hour (160 km/h), go from 0 to 60 miles per hour (97 km/h) in 5 seconds, possess a steering system to make sharp turns at city corners, and withstand a self-propelled launch of up to 30 feet (9.1 m). On the first jump test, the Tumbler's front end collapsed and had to be completely rebuilt. The basic configuration of the newly designed Tumbler included a 5.7-liter Chevy V8 engine, a truck axle for the rear axle, front tires by Hoosier (which are actually dirt racing tires used on the right rear of open wheel sprint cars), 4 rear 44/18.5-16.5 Interco Super Swamper TSL tires (44" tall, 18.5" wide, mounted on a 16.5" wheel) and the suspension system of Baja racing trucks. The design and development process took nine months and cost several million dollars.

With the design process complete, four street-ready race cars were constructed, with each vehicle possessing 65 panels and costing $250,000 to build. Two of the four cars were specialized versions. One version was the flap version, which had hydraulics and flaps to detail the close-up shots where the vehicle propelled itself through the air. The other version was the jet version, in which an actual jet engine was mounted onto the vehicle, fueled by six propane tanks. The visibility inside the vehicle was poor, so monitors were connected to cameras on the vehicle body. The professional drivers for the Tumblers practiced driving the vehicles for six months before they drove on the streets of Chicago for the film's scenes.

The interior of the Tumbler was an immobile studio set and not actually the interior of a street-capable Tumbler. The cockpit was oversized to fit cameras for scenes filmed in the Tumbler interior. In addition, another version of the Tumbler was a miniature model that was 1:6 scale of the actual Tumbler. This miniature model had an electric motor and was used to show the Tumbler flying across ravines and between buildings. However, the actual Tumbler was used for the waterfall sequence.

=== Batsuit ===
The Batsuit, as worn by Christian Bale

The filmmakers intended to create a very mobile Batsuit that would allow the wearer to move easily to fight and crouch. Previous film incarnations of the Batsuit had been stiff and especially restrictive of full head movement. Costume designer Lindy Hemming and her crew worked on the Batsuit at an FX workshop codenamed "Cape Town", a secured compound located at Shepperton Studios in London. The Batsuit's basic design was a neoprene undersuit, which was shaped by attaching molded cream latex sections. Christian Bale was molded and sculpted prior to his physical training so the team could work on a full body cast. To avoid imperfections picked up by sculpting with clay, plastiline was used to smooth the surface. In addition, the team brewed different mixtures of foam to find the mixture that would be the most flexible, light, durable, and black. The latter presented a problem, since the process to make the foam black reduced the foam's durability.

For the cape, director Christopher Nolan wanted to have a "flowing cloak... that blows and flows as in so many great graphic novels". Hemming's team created the cape out of their own version of parachute nylon that had electrostatic flocking, a process shared with the team by the British Ministry of Defence. The process was used by the London police force to minimize night vision detection. The cape was topped by a cowl, which was designed by Nolan, Hemming, and costume effects supervisor Graham Churchyard. The cowl was created to be thin enough to allow motion but thick enough to avoid wrinkling when Bale turned his head in the Batsuit. Churchyard explained the cowl had been designed to show "a man who has angst", so his character would be revealed through the mask.

=== Fight choreography ===
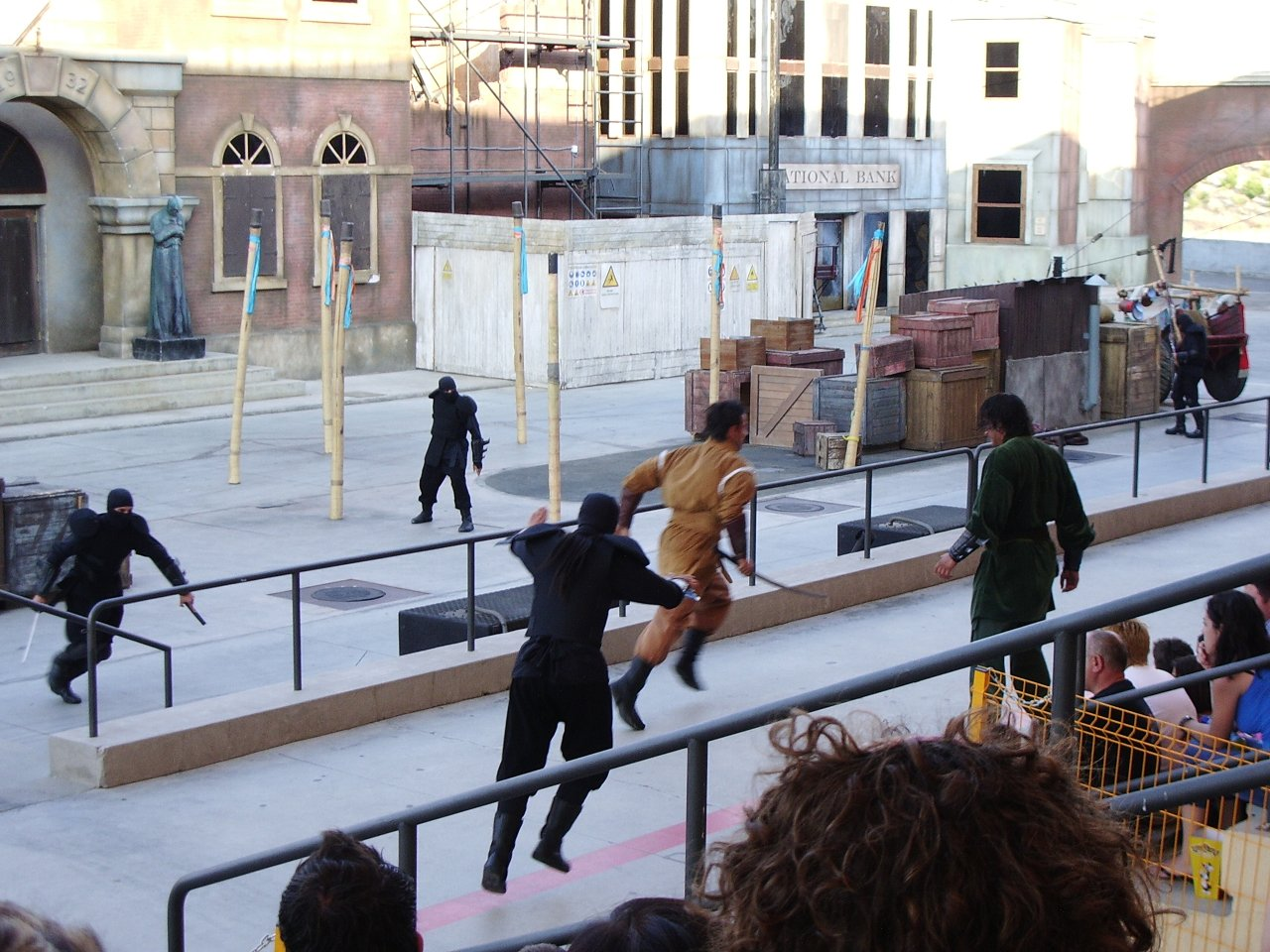
On-set fight choreography act between Bruce Wayne and the League of Shadows

Fight choreographers for Batman Begins, Justo Dieguez and Andy Norman, trained actors and stunt performers using the Spanish Keysi Fighting Method, which gained fame after it was used in the film and its sequel, The Dark Knight; however, the method was modified in The Dark Knight Rises due to Batman's age and physical condition and in order to match Bale's fighting style. The method is a self-defense system whose training is based on the study and cultivation of natural instincts.

=== Visual effects ===
For Batman Begins, Nolan preferred traditional stuntwork over computer-generated imagery. Scale models were used to represent the Narrows and Ra's al Ghul's temple. There were, however, several establishing shots that were CG composite images, such as Gotham's skyline, exterior shots of Wayne Tower, and some of the exterior monorail shots. The climactic monorail sequence mixed live action footage, model work, and CGI. The bats depicted in the film were entirely digital (except in shots containing only one or two bats), as it was decided that directing large numbers of real bats on-set would be problematic; dead bats were scanned to create digital models. Locations and sets were recreated digitally so that the flying bats would not appear incongruous once incorporated into the finished film.

== Release ==
=== Context ===
2005 was expected by industry experts to underperform compared to 2004. Many attributed the slump to be a result of high ticket prices, marketing costs, DVD sales hitting record levels, and new technologies creating an incipient demand for movies delivered directly via the Internet, over-the-airwaves, satellite dish or cable set-top box. By the start of the theatrical summer in 2005 (May), the box office slumped for 11 consecutive weeks, with year-to-date ticket sales down 5.4 percent from last year even as ticket prices rose a moderate 3 percent, to around $6.40 on average, according to Exhibitor Relations. Theater attendance prior to the summer of 2005 declined about 8 percent.

Several films were projected to not only perform well at the box office, but also reverse the slump at the box office. Star Wars: Episode III – Revenge of the Sith was expected by the industry to be the top-grossing film of the summer due to being the final live action Star Wars film at the time. Other films that were expected to do well were Batman Begins, Madagascar, Mr. & Mrs. Smith, Fantastic Four, War of the Worlds, and Charlie and the Chocolate Factory.

Batman Begins was expected by industry experts to help reverse the box office slump in June. However, there were concerns over a possible soft opening for the film. The previous film, Batman & Robin, was widely panned by critics and was credited with stalling the franchise since 1997. Bale's lack of star power at the time and a lack of iconic villains such as the Joker and Penguin that were portrayed by A-list celebrities were seen as possible detachments from audiences. Some also expressed concerns that Holmes' involvement with the film could derail the film's financial prospect due to her high-profile relationship with Tom Cruise (whose film War of the Worlds opened the following weekend) after his controversial appearance on The Oprah Winfrey Show.

=== Theatrical ===
Warner Bros. held the world premiere for Batman Begins in Tokyo, Japan on May 31, 2005. The film opened on June 15, 2005, in the United States and Canada in 3,858 theaters, including 55 IMAX theaters.

=== Home media ===
The DVD of Batman Begins was released on October 18, 2005, in both single-disc and two-disc deluxe editions and also released on VHS and UMD Video formats. In addition to the film, the deluxe edition contained featurettes and other bonus materials. The edition contained a small paperback booklet, the first Batman story, featured in Detective Comics #27, as well as Batman: The Man Who Falls and an excerpt from Batman: The Long Halloween. Batman Begins achieved first place in national sales and rental charts in October 2005, becoming the top-selling DVD of the fourth quarter of 2005. The DVD grossed $11.36 million in rental revenue. The DVD held its position at the top of the sales chart for a second week, but fell to second place behind Bewitched on video rental charts. The film had brought in $167 million in DVD sales by August 2006.

Batman Begins was released on HD DVD on October 10, 2006. A Limited Edition Giftset of the film was released on DVD and Blu-ray on July 8, 2008, to coincide with The Dark Knight which hit theaters July 18, 2008. Due to the successful box office performance of The Dark Knight, the Batman Begins DVD saw an increase in both sales and rentals. Batman Begins was released on 4K UHD Blu-ray on December 19, 2017. It received a novelization written by Dennis O'Neil, and a comic book adaptation by Scott Beatty.

== Reception ==
=== Box office ===
Batman Begins ranked at the top in its opening weekend, accumulating $48 million, which was seen as "strong but unimpressive by today's instantaneous blockbuster standards". The film's five-day gross was $72.9 million, beating Batman Forever (1995) as the franchise high. Batman Begins also broke the five-day opening record in the 55 IMAX theaters, grossing $3.16 million. Polled moviegoers rated the film with an A, and according to the studio's surveys, Batman Begins was considered the best of all the Batman films. The audience's demographic was 57 percent male and 54 percent people over the age of 25.

The film held its top spot for another weekend, accumulating $28 million in a 43 percent drop from its first weekend. Batman Begins went on to gross $205 million in North America and had a worldwide total of $371.8 million from its original release. It earned $1.6 million more from its 2012 re-release, bringing its lifetime worldwide total to $375.6 million. It is the fourth-highest-grossing Batman film, as of August 2012, behind Tim Burton's Batman, which grossed $411 million worldwide and also being surpassed by its sequels The Dark Knight and The Dark Knight Rises, both of which have grossed over $1 billion. Batman Begins averaged $12,634 per theater in its opening weekend. It was released in more theaters, but sold fewer tickets than the other previous Batman movies, with the exception of Batman & Robin. Batman Begins was the seventh-highest-grossing film of 2005 in the United States.

=== Critical response ===
Review aggregator Rotten Tomatoes gives Batman Begins an approval rating of 85% based on 285 reviews, with an average rating of 7.7/10. The site's critical consensus reads, "Brooding and dark, but also exciting and smart, Batman Begins is a film that understands the essence of one of the definitive superheroes." At Metacritic, which assigns a weighted mean rating reviews, the film received an average score of 70 out of 100, based on 41 critics, which indicates "generally favorable" reviews. Audiences polled by CinemaScore gave the film an average grade of "A" on an A+ to F scale.

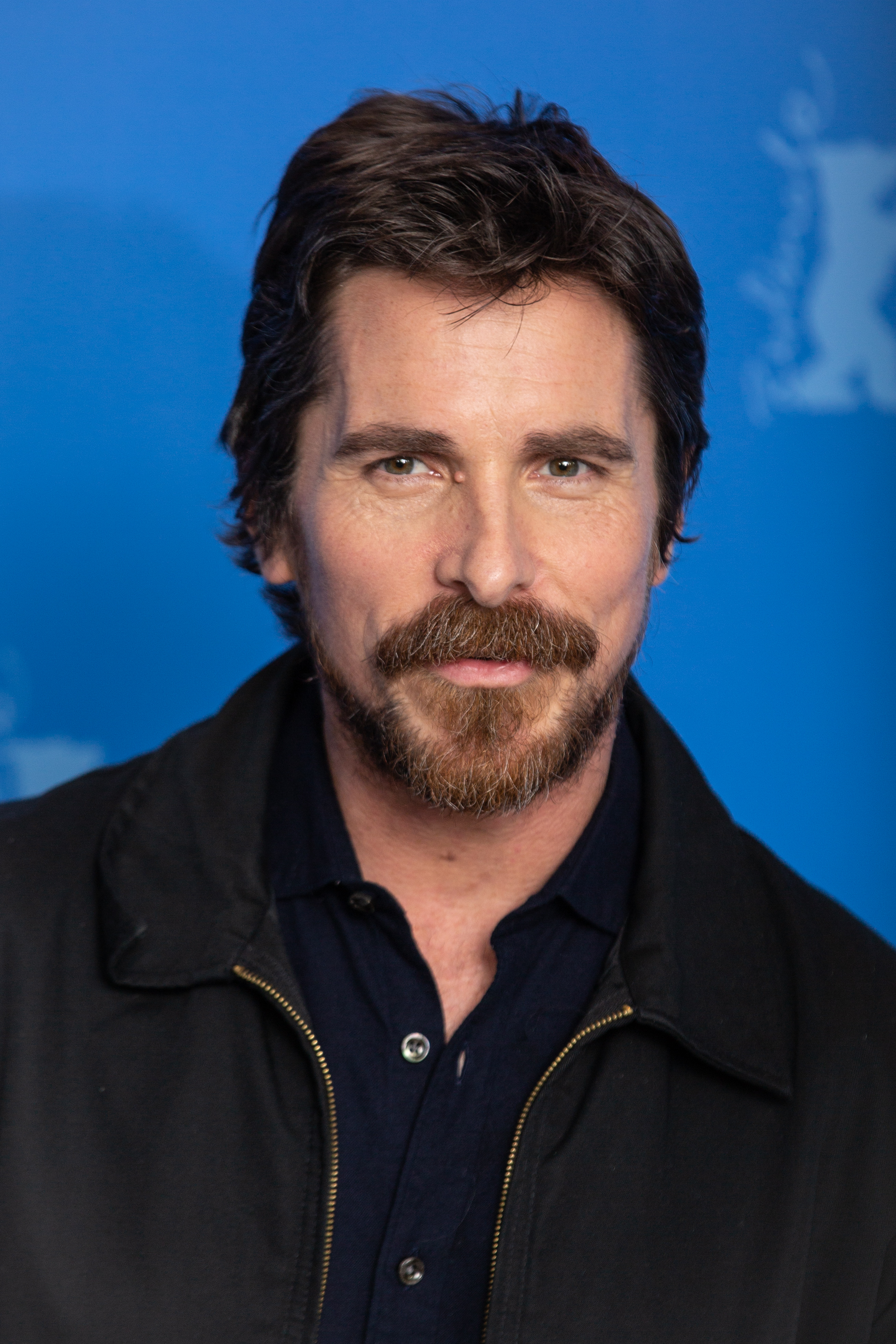
Bale received critical acclaim for his performance in the film.

James Berardinelli applauded Nolan and Goyer's work in creating more understanding into "who [Batman] is and what motivates him", something Berardinelli felt Tim Burton's film had lacked; at the same time, Berardinelli felt the romantic aspect between Bale and Holmes did not work because the actors lacked the chemistry Christopher Reeve and Margot Kidder (Superman), or Tobey Maguire and Kirsten Dunst (Spider-Man) shared in their respective roles. According to Total Film, Nolan manages to create such strong characters and story that the third-act action sequences cannot compare to "the frisson of two people talking", and Katie Holmes and Christian Bale's romantic subplot has a spark "refreshingly free of Peter Parker/Mary Jane-style whining".

Los Angeles Times' Kenneth Turan, who felt the film began slowly, stated that the "story, psychology and reality, not special effects", assisted the darkness behind Batman's arsenal; he noted that Neeson and Holmes, unlike Bale's ability to "feel his role in his bones", do not appear to fit their respective characters in "being both comic-book archetypes and real people". The New Yorker's David Denby did not share Berardinelli and Turan's opinion. He was unimpressed with the film, when comparing it to the two Tim Burton films, and that Christian Bale's presence was hindered by the "dull earnestness of the screenplay", the final climax was "cheesy and unexciting", and that Nolan had resorted to imitating the "fakery" used by other filmmakers when filming action sequences.

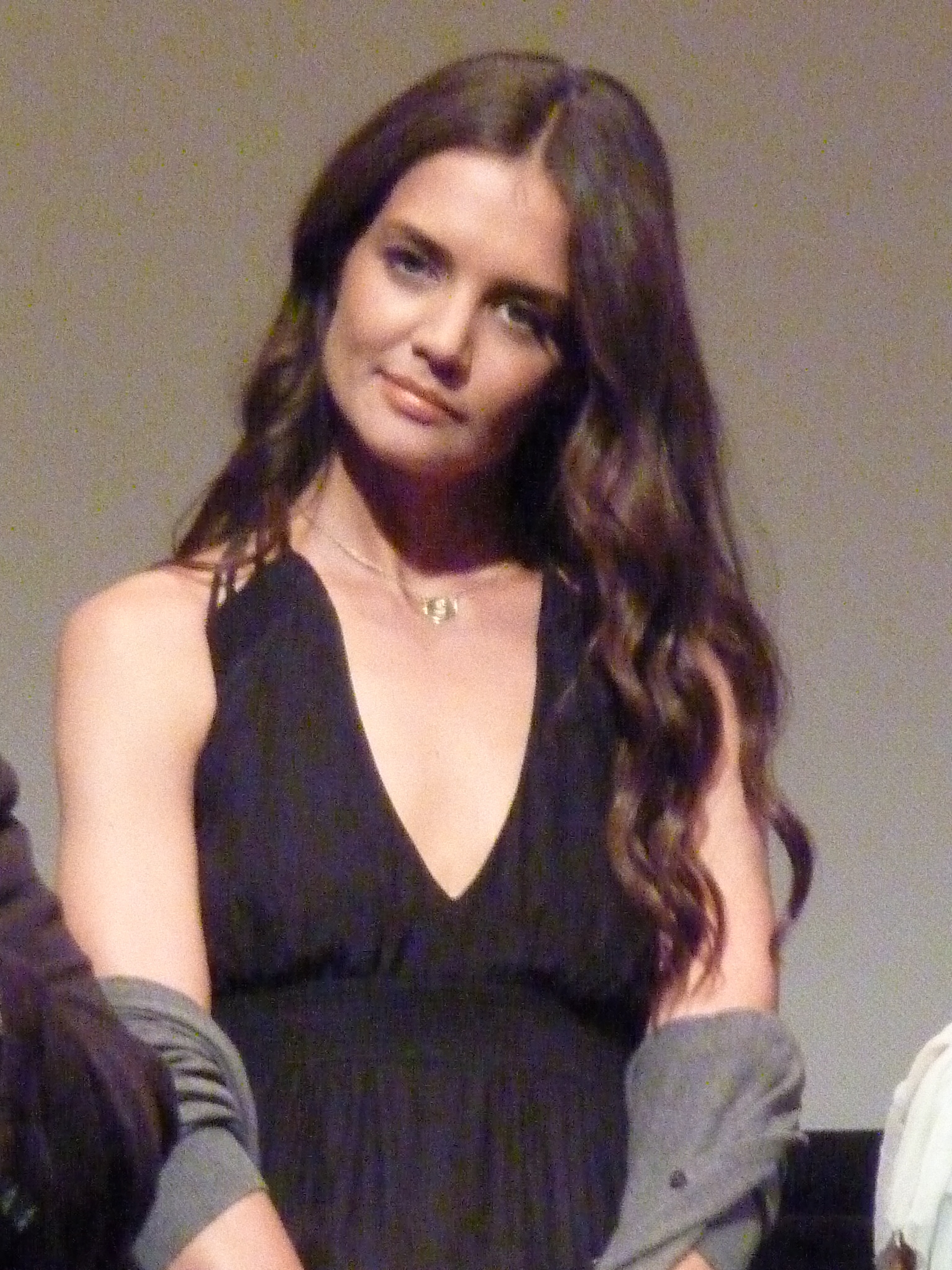
Holmes' performance was criticized by critics, noting her lack of range and depth compared to the rest of the cast.

Michael Wilmington of the Chicago Tribune believed Nolan and Goyer managed to "comfortably mix the tormented drama and revenge motifs with light hearted gags and comic book allusions," and that Nolan takes the series out of the "slam-bang Hollywood jokefests" the franchise had drifted into. Comic book scribe and editor Dennis O'Neil stated that he "felt the filmmakers really understood the character they were translating", citing this film as the best of the live-action Batman films. In contrast, J. R. Jones, from the Chicago Reader, criticized the script, and Nolan and David Goyer for not living up to the "hype about exploring Batman's damaged psyche". Roger Ebert, who gave mixed reviews to the previous films, and claimed in his review for Batman Returns that he did not believe noir worked in superhero films, wrote this was "the Batman movie I've been waiting for; more correctly, this is the movie I did not realize I was waiting for". Giving it four out of four stars, he commended the realistic portrayals of the Batman arsenal – the Batsuit, Batcave, Tumbler, and the Batsignal – as well as the focus on "the story and character" with less stress on "high-tech action".

Like Berardinelli, USA Today's Mike Clark thought Bale performed the role of Batman as well as he did Patrick Bateman in American Psycho, but that the relationship between Bruce Wayne and Rachel Dawes was "frustratingly underdeveloped". Kyle Smith thought Bale exhibited "both the menace and the wit he showed in his brilliant turn in American Psycho", and that the film works so well because of the realism, stating, "Batman starts stripping away each layer of Gotham crime only to discover a sicker and more monstrous evil beneath, his rancid city simultaneously invokes early '90s New York, when criminals frolicked to the tune of five murders a day; Serpico New York, when cops were for sale; and today, when psychos seek to kill us all at once rather than one by one." In contrast, Salon.com's Stephanie Zacharek felt Nolan did not deliver the emotional depth expected of "one of the most soulful and tortured superheroes of all"; she thought Bale, unlike Michael Keaton who she compared him to, failed to connect with the audience underneath the mask, but that Gary Oldman succeeded in "emotional complexity" where the rest of the movie failed.

Film director Tim Burton—who had directed the 1989 Batman film and its first sequel—felt Nolan "captured the real spirit that these kind of movies are supposed to have nowadays. When I did Batman twenty years ago, in 1988 or something, it was a different time in comic book movies. You couldn't go into that dark side of comics yet. The last couple of years that has become acceptable and Nolan certainly got more to the root of what the Batman comics are about."

=== Accolades ===
Award	Date of Ceremony	Category	Recipient(s)	Result
Academy Awards	March 5, 2006	Best Cinematography	Wally Pfister	Nominated
African-American Film Critics Association	December 30, 2005	Top 10 Films (9th place)	Batman Begins	Won
American Society of Cinematographers	February 26, 2006	Outstanding Achievement in Cinematography in Theatrical Releases	Wally Pfister	Nominated
Art Directors Guild Awards	February 11, 2006	Excellence in Production Design for a Fantasy or Period Film	Nathan Crowley	Nominated
ASCAP Film and Television Music Awards	2006	Top Box Office Films	James Newton Howard, Hans Zimmer, Ramin Djawadi	Won
Awards Circuit Community Awards	2005	Best Cinematography	Wally Pfister	2nd place
Black Movie Awards	2005	Outstanding Performance by an Actor in a Supporting Role	Morgan Freeman	Nominated
British Academy Film Awards	February 19, 2006	Best Production Design	Nathan Crowley	Nominated
British Academy Film Awards	February 19, 2006	Best Sound	David Evans, Stefan Henrix and Peter Lindsay	Nominated
British Academy Film Awards	February 19, 2006	Best Special Visual Effects	Janek Sirrs, Dan Glass, Chris Corbould and Paul Franklin	Nominated
British Society of Cinematographers	2006	Best Cinematography in a Theatrical Feature Film	Wally Pfister	Nominated
Broadcast Film Critics Association Awards	2013	Favorite Film Franchise	Batman Begins, shared with The Dark Knight and The Dark Knight Rises	Nominated
Central Ohio Film Critics Association	2006	Best Picture	Batman Begins	Nominated
Chicago Film Critics Association Awards	January 9, 2006	Best Original Score	Hans Zimmer, James Newton Howard	Nominated
Costume Designers Guild Awards	2006	Excellence in Fantasy Film	Lindy Hemming	Nominated
DVD Exclusive Awards	2006	Best Games and Interactivities	For "Inner Demons Comic" in "Batman Begins: Deluxe Edition"	Nominated
DVD Exclusive Awards	2006	Best New Movie Scenes	For "Tankman Begins" in "Batman Begins: Deluxe Edition" (DVD) (shared with	Nominated
Empire Awards	March 13, 2006	Best Thriller	Batman Begins	Nominated
Empire Awards	March 13, 2006	Best Director	Christopher Nolan	Nominated
Empire Awards	March 13, 2006	Best Actor	Christian Bale	Nominated
Gold Derby Awards	2006	Sound Editing/Mixing	David Evans, Stefan Henrix, Peter Lindsay	Nominated
Golden Raspberry Awards	March 4, 2006	Worst Supporting Actress	Katie Holmes	Nominated
Golden Schmoes Awards	2005	Favorite Movie of the Year	Batman Begins	Won
Golden Schmoes Awards	2005	Best Director of the Year	Christopher Nolan	Nominated
Golden Schmoes Awards	2005	Best Screenplay of the Year	Christopher Nolan, David S. Goyer	Nominated
Golden Schmoes Awards	2005	Biggest Surprise of the Year	The Dark Knight	Nominated
Golden Schmoes Awards	2005	Best Actor of the Year	Christian Bale	Nominated
Golden Schmoes Awards	2005	Breakthrough Performance of the Year	Cillian Murphy	Nominated
Golden Schmoes Awards	2005	Coolest Character of the Year	Batman	Nominated
Golden Schmoes Awards	2005	Best Music in a Movie	Batman Begins	Nominated
Golden Schmoes Awards	2005	Favorite Movie Poster of the Year	Batman Begins	Nominated
Golden Schmoes Awards	2005	Best Trailer of the Year	Batman Begins	Nominated
Golden Schmoes Awards	2005	Best DVD/Blu-Ray of the Year	For 'Batman Begins: Deluxe Edition'	Nominated
Golden Schmoes Awards	2005	Best Action Sequence of the Year	For 'Tumbler chase'	Nominated
Golden Schmoes Awards	2013	Best DVD/Blu-Ray of the Year	For 'Ultimate Collector's Edition' shared with The Dark Knight and The Dark Knight Rises	Won
Golden Trailer Awards	2005	Summer 2005 Blockbuster	Batman Begins	Nominated
Golden Trailer Awards	2006	Best Action	Batman Begins	Nominated
Hollywood Film Awards	2005	Sound of the Year	David Evans	Won
Hugo Awards	2006	Best Dramatic Presentation	Christopher Nolan (director, screenplay), David S. Goyer (screenplay, story), Bob Kane (original character)	Nominated
IGN Summer Movie Awards	2008	Best Blu-ray of the Summer	Batman Begins	Won
IGN Summer Movie Awards	2013	Best Movie Blu-Ray	For "The Dark Knight Ultimate Trilogy Collector's Edition"	Won
International Film Music Critics Award	2006	Best Original Score for an Action/Adventure Film	Hans Zimmer, James Newton Howard	Nominated
International Online Cinema Awards	2006	Best Visual Effects	Batman Begins	Nominated
International Online Cinema Awards	2006	Best Sound Mixing	Lora Hirschberg, Gary A. Rizzo, Peter Lindsay	Nominated
International Online Cinema Awards	2006	Best Sound Editing	David Evans, Stefan Henrix	Nominated
Irish Film and Television Awards	November 5, 2005	Best International Film	Batman Begins	Nominated
Irish Film and Television Awards	November 5, 2005	Best International Actor	Christian Bale	Nominated
Irish Film and Television Awards	November 5, 2005	Best Supporting Actor in a Feature Film	Cillian Murphy	Nominated
Italian Online Movie Awards	2006	Best Supporting Actor	Michael Caine	Nominated
Italian Online Movie Awards	2006	Best Special Effects	Batman Begins	Nominated
Key Art Awards	2005	Action Adventure Posters	Batman Begins	Nominated
Key Art Awards	2005	International Film Posters	Batman Begins	Won
London Critics Circle Film Awards	February 8, 2006	British Supporting Actor of the Year	Cillian Murphy	Nominated
London Critics Circle Film Awards	February 8, 2006	British Director of the Year	Christopher Nolan	Nominated
Motion Picture Sound Editors	2006	Best Sound Editing - Foreign Language Feature Film	David Evans, Stefan Henrix (supervising sound editors/sound designers); Justine Angus, Rodney Berling, Rodney Glenn, Nigel Holand, Jed Loughran (sound effects editors); Derek Trigg (Foley editor); Iain Eyre (dialogue editor); Howard Halsall (ADR editor); Glen Gathard (assistant Foley editor); Peter Burgis, Andie Derrick (Foley artists)	Nominated
Motion Picture Sound Editors	2006	Best Sound Editing - Feature Music	Steven Price (supervising music editor); Simon Changer, Gareth Cousins, Richard Robson (music editors)	Nominated
MTV Movie + TV Awards	June 3, 2006	Best Movie	Batman Begins	Nominated
MTV Movie + TV Awards	June 3, 2006	Best Hero	Christian Bale	Won
MTV Movie + TV Awards	June 3, 2006	Best Villain	Cillian Murphy	Nominated
Online Film & Television Association	2006	Best Sound Mixing	Jimmy Boyle, Lora Hirschberg, Gary A. Rizzo, Jamie Roden	Nominated
Online Film & Television Association	2006	Best Sound Effects Editing	David Evans, Stefan Henrix	Nominated
Online Film Critics Society Awards	January 16, 2006	Best Original Score	James Newton Howard, Hans Zimmer	Nominated
People's Choice Awards	January 10, 2006	Favorite Movie	Batman Begins	Nominated
People's Choice Awards	January 10, 2006	Favorite Movie Drama	Batman Begins	Nominated
Phoenix Film Critics Society Awards	2006	Best Stunts	Batman Begins	Won
Rondo Hatton Classic Horror Awards	2005	Best Film	Christopher Nolan	Nominated
Satellite Awards	December 17, 2005	Two-Disc Deluxe Edition With Comic Book	Outstanding Overall DVD	Nominated
Saturn Awards	May 2, 2006	Best Fantasy Film	Batman Begins	Won
Saturn Awards	May 2, 2006	Best Director	Christopher Nolan	Nominated
Saturn Awards	May 2, 2006	Best Screenplay	Christopher Nolan & David S. Goyer	Won
Saturn Awards	May 2, 2006	Best Actor	Christian Bale	Won
Saturn Awards	May 2, 2006	Best Supporting Actor	Liam Neeson	Nominated
Saturn Awards	May 2, 2006	Best Supporting Actress	Katie Holmes	Nominated
Saturn Awards	May 2, 2006	Best Costume	Lindy Hemming	Nominated
Saturn Awards	May 2, 2006	Best Score	Hans Zimmer & James Newton Howard	Nominated
Saturn Awards	May 2, 2006	Best Visual Effects	Janek Sirrs, Dan Glass, Chris Corbould, Paul J. Franklin	Nominated
Science Fiction and Fantasy Writers of America	2007	Best Script	Christopher Nolan & David S. Goyer	Nominated
Scream Awards	October 7, 2006	The Ultimate Scream	Batman Begins	Won
Scream Awards	October 7, 2006	Best Director	Christopher Nolan	Won
Scream Awards	October 7, 2006	Best Scream-Play	Christopher Nolan & David S. Goyer	Won
Scream Awards	October 7, 2006	Most Heroic Performance	Christian Bale	Nominated
SFX Awards	2005	Best Director	Christopher Nolan	Nominated
Teen Choice Awards	August 20, 2006	Movies: Choice Sleazebag	Cillian Murphy (with Red Eye)	Nominated
Teen Choice Awards	August 20, 2006	Choice Summer Movie	Batman Begins	Nominated
Visual Effects Society Awards	February 15, 2006	Outstanding Created Environment in a Live Action Motion Picture	Alex Wuttke, Pete Bebb, Dayne Cowan, Imery Watson	Nominated
World Soundtrack Awards	October 15, 2005	Best Original Soundtrack of the Year	James Newton Howard, Hans Zimmer	Nominated

== Impact ==
Batman Begins has been cited as one of the most influential films of the 2000s. On the film's 10th anniversary, Forbes published an article describing its lasting influence: "Reboot became part of our modern vocabulary, and superhero origin stories became increasingly en vogue for the genre. The phrase "dark and gritty" likewise joined the cinematic lexicon, influencing our perception of different approaches to storytelling not only in the comic book film genre but in all sorts of other genres as well." Shawn Adler of MTV stated Batman Begins heralded a trend of darker genre films, that either retold back-stories or rebooted them altogether. Examples he cited were Casino Royale, as well as the in-development RoboCop, Red Sonja, and Grayskull.

== Themes ==
Comic book writer and author Danny Fingeroth argues that a strong theme in the film is Bruce's search for a father figure, saying "[Alfred] is the good father that Bruce comes to depend on. Bruce's real father died before they could establish an adult relationship, and Liam Neeson's Ducard is stern and demanding, didactic and challenging, but not a father figure with any sympathy. If Bruce is anyone's son, he is Alfred's. [Morgan] Freeman's Lucius is cool and imperturbable, another steady anchor in Bruce's life." Blogger Mark Fisher states that Bruce's search for justice requires him to learn from a proper father figure, with Thomas Wayne and Ra's al Ghul being the two counterpoints. Alfred provides a maternal figure of unconditional love, despite the overall lack of focus on a mother figure in Bruce's life.

Fingeroth also argues that a major theme in the film is fear, which supports the story of Bruce Wayne becoming a hero. Director Christopher Nolan stated that the idea behind the film was "a person who would confront his innermost fear and then attempt to become it". Fingeroth referred to this film's depiction as "the man with fear—but who rises above it". The theme of fear is further personified by the Scarecrow. The film depicts how fear can affect all creatures regardless of might. Allusions to fear are seen throughout, from Bruce's conquering of his demons, to becoming Batman, to the Scarecrow and his deadly fear toxin. The macabre, distorted images presented in the Scarecrow's toxin-induced hallucinations also express the idea of terror to an extreme.

Critic Brian Orndorf considered Batman Begins "fierce" and "demonstrative in brood", giving the film an abundance of gravitas and energy. It strays away from the lighter fare of Joel Schumacher's 1997 Batman film, Batman & Robin, which contained camp one-liners throughout. The theme of fear is intensified with the help of the musical score by Zimmer and Howard, which also "eschews traditional heroic themes". Also contrary to previous Batman films, a psychological investigation of Bruce Wayne's split personality in the bat suit is only lightly touched upon. Orndorf noted that Bruce is a "character constantly striving to do the right thing, not worn down by incessant reexamination".

== See also ==
- Vigilante film
- Neo-noir
- Superhero Movie: a 2008 comedy film. It serves as a parody of Batman Begins and the superhero genre.
- List of films shot in Iceland

== Bibliography ==
- Kirsch, Konrad (2024). From ›Doodlebug" to "Oppenheimer‹. An Analysis of Christopher Nolan's Film Work. Stuttgart / London: Edition Axel Menges. ISBN 978-3-86905-037-9.
