= Joker (The Dark Knight) =

Character portrayed by Heath Ledger

- The Dark Knight trilogy character
- Heath Ledger as the Joker in The Dark Knight (2008)
- First appearance: The Dark Knight (2008)
- Based on: Joker by: Bill Finger; Bob Kane; Jerry Robinson
- Adapted by: Christopher Nolan; Jonathan Nolan; David S. Goyer
- Portrayed by: Heath Ledger
- Voiced by: Ewan Bailey (Lego Batman: Legacy of the Dark Knight)

In-universe information
- Full name: Unknown
- Alias: The Joker
- Occupation: Crime boss
- Affiliation: Gotham Organized Crime; The Joker's Thugs
- Home: Gotham City

The Joker is a fictional character and the main antagonist of Christopher Nolan's 2008 film The Dark Knight, the second film in The Dark Knight trilogy. He is based on the DC Comics character of the same name. Portrayed by Heath Ledger, he is depicted as a psychopathic anarchist mastermind who is determined to sow chaos and anarchy throughout Gotham City.

Ledger's portrayal of the Joker was influenced by the graphic novels Batman: The Killing Joke (1988) and Arkham Asylum: A Serious House on Serious Earth (1989). The character retains his traditional purple-and-green color palette, while his disfigured, clown-like appearance is achieved through smeared makeup concealing facial scars resembling a Glasgow smile, rather than the chemically bleached skin depicted in some comic book origins. Additional inspiration for the performance came from the works of painter Francis Bacon, the character Alex DeLarge from Anthony Burgess' 1962 novel A Clockwork Orange and its 1971 film adaptation of the same name, as well as elements of punk rock culture.

Although Ledger's casting was initially met with skepticism, his performance was released to universal critical acclaim from critics and audiences following the film's premiere in July 2008, six months after his death from an accidental prescription drug overdose. He posthumously received numerous accolades, including the Academy Award for Best Supporting Actor. Ledger's Joker is frequently cited as one of the greatest and most iconic villains in film history and popular culture, and is regarded as one of the most definitive screen adaptations of the character.

== Concept and development ==
=== Casting ===
I feel like this is an opportunity for me to not take myself too seriously, and for some reason, I just gravitated towards [The Joker] and I knew I had something to give to him. And I just instantly had an idea of how to do it.

— Heath Ledger on why he preferred playing the Joker.

On July 31, 2006, The Dark Knight was officially announced by Warner Bros. Pictures and Heath Ledger was cast as the Joker. Director Christopher Nolan had met with Ledger over the years for different roles, including the part of Batman in Batman Begins (2005). Ledger explained that he was not interested in working on superhero films: "I would just feel stupid and silly. I couldn't pull it off and there are other people who can perfectly, but I just couldn't take myself seriously". After seeing and being impressed with Batman Begins, however, Ledger sought the part of the Joker in its sequel. Nolan cast Ledger before there was a script due to his determination, stating, "Heath was just ready to do it, he was ready to do something that big." Casting director John Papsidera stated that they needed somebody courageous to play the part. Joaquin Phoenix, who later portrayed the Joker in Todd Phillips' 2019 film Joker and its 2024 sequel, Joker: Folie à Deux, and Leonardo DiCaprio were offered the role by Nolan, Phoenix turned it down as he "wasn't ready then"; and DiCaprio didn't respond to the offer.

As a starting actor, Ledger did not attach himself seriously to the roles he was playing. This changed, however, when at age 22 he started to watch some of his films. Realizing that they were movies he himself might not actually have wanted to see, it made him more cautious and respectful towards his professional choices. The 2005 fantasy film The Brothers Grimm marked a turning point for the actor, as director Terry Gilliam gave Ledger—and his co-star, Matt Damon—the opportunity to explore and create characters unlike any they had previously been offered. Gilliam helped Ledger put on a clown act for that film, an experience the actor later acknowledged as an influence for his performance as the Joker.

=== Performance ===
"Everything about what he does from every gesture, every little facial tic, everything he's doing with his voice—it all speaks to the heart of this character. It all speaks to this idea of a character who's devoted to a concept of pure anarchy and chaos. It's hard to get a handle on how those elements combine. The physicality reminds me of the great silent comedians. It has a bit of [Buster] Keaton and [Charlie] Chaplin about it."

— Christopher Nolan on Ledger's performance.

Highlighting the opportunity for freshness, Ledger aimed for a new and different interpretation of the character, separate from previous film incarnations. Ledger and Christopher Nolan both explained seeing eye-to-eye on the Joker's appearance in the film, sharing common reference points for who the character was going to be. Based on philosophical ideas of anarchy and chaos, they drew visual inspiration from the artwork of Francis Bacon. They also discussed Malcolm McDowell's performance as Alex in Stanley Kubrick's 1971 film A Clockwork Orange, as well as the character's depiction in Anthony Burgess's 1962 original novel. Ledger was given Alan Moore's 1988 graphic novel Batman: The Killing Joke for preparation for the role, as well as Grant Morrison's 1989 graphic novel Arkham Asylum: A Serious House on Serious Earth, which he "really tried to read and put it down". The vocal style Ledger used is rumored to be influenced by Tom Waits. In an interview with MTV, Ledger said he regarded the experience playing the Joker as the most fun he ever had, "and probably will ever have".

Steve Alexander, Ledger's agent, said the actor had a "pay-or-play" deal on The Dark Knight, "so he felt free to do whatever he wanted to do as the Joker, no matter how crazy." According to The Imaginarium of Doctor Parnassus cinematographer Nicola Pecorini, Ledger had talked with him about Johnny Depp's off-kilter portrayal of Jack Sparrow in Pirates of the Caribbean: The Curse of the Black Pearl in relation to The Dark Knight, aiming to make a performance that would be "so far out he'd be fired". As Ledger was cast early in pre-production, Nolan explained that the actor had "months and months" to prepare for the role.

=== Execution ===
"Inside. He's laughing red and black and red and black till there's nothing left to laugh. Until, almost tenderly, he turns inside out through his mouth."

— Scrawlings from Heath Ledger's Joker diary

During a span of six weeks, Heath Ledger secluded himself in a London hotel room, compiling a character diary and experimenting with voices. "It's a combination of reading all the comic books I could that were relevant to the script and then just closing my eyes and meditating on it", he said about his process. The diary contains photos, news clippings, various handwritten thoughts and words, and portions of dialogue from the film. Christopher Hooton, writing for The Independent, said that the 'Joker journal' had several stills from Stanley Kubrick's film A Clockwork Orange, joker cards, photos of hyenas, unhinged clown makeup and the word "chaos" highlighted in green. Furthermore, it contains a list of things the Joker would find funny, such as AIDS, landmines, and geniuses suffering brain damage. It was revealed that Ledger had read Grant Morrison's The Clown at Midnight (Batman #663) and based the list upon the Batman writer's prose.

Ledger highlighted the importance of finding an iconic voice and laugh for the character, relating the voice as "the key to the demented killer". Nolan explained Ledger's early and "peculiar" ambition for the voice of the character, saying that the actor had studied the way ventriloquist dummies talk. The filmmaker also acknowledged that the voice performance was based on the Alexander technique.

Ledger developed the Joker's voice and mannerisms slowly over time and during camera tests. "Don't act, just read it", Nolan had told Ledger for a test screening. In hair and makeup tests, Ledger would start exploring the movements of the character. While test recording without sound, he shared his take on the Joker's voice and physicality, and "in that way he sort of sneaked upon it".

Ledger developed the physical appearance of the character, being "very involved" with the painting of his face, says prosthetic supervisor Conor O'Sullivan. O'Sullivan acknowledged how Ledger, Nolan, and makeup artist John Caglione all gravitated towards a Francis Bacon painting Nolan was referring to. Ledger also got to choose the Joker's weapon among different rubber knives, and he worked closely with costume designer Lindy Hemming on deciding the look for the character.

Nolan noted, "We gave a Francis Bacon spin to [his face]. This corruption, this decay in the texture of the look itself. It's grubby. You can almost imagine what he smells like." Costume designer Lindy Hemming picked inspiration for the "chaotic" look from such countercultural pop culture artists as Iggy Pop, Johnny Rotten, and Sid Vicious. She gave the image for the Joker of someone who is "very sweaty" and who "probably doesn't have a proper home". She tried to present a backstory for the character "that he really doesn't look after himself".

Application of Ledger's makeup was done with the actor scrunching special facial expressions. Caglione called the application work "a dance". This technique created facial textures for white paint. As Ledger closed his eyes tight, Caglione put on the black makeup. Then, water was sprayed over the eyes and the actor would squeeze his eyes and shake his head to create imperfections in the makeup.

To get in character for filming, Ledger kept his Joker diary with him on set and frequently referred to it. Between takes, Ledger would stay in costume and makeup just being himself. The actor would fool around, skateboarding while in his Joker costume on set, and smoking cigarettes. John Caglione described Ledger as helping others around to relax, never letting "the intense nature of the roles overwhelm him".

The first sequence shot was the film's IMAX opening, the "prologue". As the Joker wears a mask through the scene with minimal dialogue, Nolan set the prologue first in the schedule because he wanted to put off performance worries, allowing Ledger to enjoy that relief.

The interrogation scene between Batman and the Joker was the first scene shot with Ledger really showing the full performance altogether. The director and his leading actors all liked the idea of shooting the key scene early on. During rehearsals, the actors kept things loose and improvisational, saving for the actual shoot. Christian Bale, who portrayed Batman, confirmed that Ledger did not perform the Joker's voice during rehearsals, waiting to get in character when the cameras rolled. Nolan later acknowledged the scene to be his favorite in the film, saying "I had never seen anybody sell a punch the way Heath was able to do with Christian."

Ledger was allowed to shoot and direct the videos the Joker sends out as warnings. Each take Ledger made was different from the last. Nolan was impressed enough with the first video shoot that he chose not to be present when Ledger filmed the scene with a kidnapped reporter portrayed by Anthony Michael Hall.

Ledger always showed up early on set. The first thing he would do, according to Caglione, was give bear hugs to cast and crew members around the set. "And no matter how banged-up or bruised Heath was after a long day, after we'd take off the last drop of makeup, he'd just hug everybody in the trailer before he left". At the end of shooting, on his Joker diary's final page, Ledger wrote "BYE BYE".

==== Effects of Heath Ledger's death ====
On January 22, 2008, after he had completed filming The Dark Knight, Ledger died, aged 28, of an accidental prescription drug overdose, leading to intense press attention and memorial tributes. "It was tremendously emotional, right when he passed, having to go back in and look at him every day [during editing]", Nolan recalled. "But the truth is, I feel very lucky to have something productive to do, to have a performance that he was very, very proud of, and that he had entrusted to me to finish". All of Ledger's scenes appear as he completed them in the filming; in editing the film, Nolan added no digital effects to alter Ledger's actual performance posthumously. Nolan dedicated the film in part to Ledger's memory.

Ledger's death affected the marketing campaign for The Dark Knight and both the production and marketing of Terry Gilliam's 2009 fantasy film The Imaginarium of Doctor Parnassus; both Nolan and Gilliam celebrated and paid tribute to Ledger's work in these films. During production of The Dark Knight, Michael Jai White's Gambol was meant to survive his confrontation with Ledger's Joker, which would have resulted in the Joker giving Gambol a Glasgow smile of his own and enabling the filmmakers to reuse Gambol in the future, with White commenting that Gambol was supposed to have a bigger role in further sequels, returning to Gotham City and trying to take it over. After Ledger's passing, Nolan cut Gambol's later scenes and edited the confrontation to suggest but not actually show his death, something White did not find out until seeing the premiere.

Writer David S. Goyer's original intent for the Batman Begins sequels in 2005 involved the Joker being apprehended by Batman with the aid of Commissioner Gordon and Harvey Dent in the second film and the Joker scarring Dent during his trial in the third film. However, most aspects of Goyer's film treatments were absorbed into The Dark Knight. According to Ledger's sister Kate, Ledger was planning to reprise his role as the Joker for another film, a notion supported by Aaron Eckhart, who portrayed Dent, and recalled that Ledger had planned to return in a sequel. Nolan ultimately decided that the Joker would not return in The Dark Knight Rises and dispelled rumors that he would use unused footage from The Dark Knight to bring Ledger back.

== Characterization ==
Ledger described the Joker as a "psychopathic, mass murdering, schizophrenic clown with zero empathy". He embodies themes of chaos, anarchy and obsession, expressing a desire to upset Gotham's social order through crime and defining himself by his conflict with Batman. After their first fight, Batman struggles to understand exactly what the Joker's motivations are. His butler Alfred Pennyworth suggests that he might be motivated solely by the thrill of the crime, saying, "Some men just want to watch the world burn."

The Joker's hair is stringy, unkempt, and dyed green. His face is covered by a cracked, smeared and runny layer of white clown makeup, while his sunken eyes are thickly rimmed in black and his teeth are yellowed. A red grin is sloppily painted across his mouth and cheeks, covering the facial scars of a Glasgow smile. Wearing the character's traditional color palette from the comics, the Joker is dressed in a light purple shirt with a thin medium-toned purple tie and a green waistcoat, topped by a dark purple overcoat; he also wears purple pants and leather gloves, the former marked with pinstripes. The film reveals that his clothing is custom-made, with no labels. The patterns and designs chosen were popular during the Victorian and Edwardian periods; however, they are given an eccentric twist with the purple and green color palette. The Joker's shoes have an upward swoop at the toe, reminiscent of clown shoes.

The Joker carries no identification of any kind, and offers no clear details about his true name or background. He tells two different stories of how he got his scars, involving child abuse and self-mutilation, respectively. When he is arrested by the Gotham City police, they find only knives and lint in his pockets. It is believed that Joker is a former soldier with PTSD, which would also explain his expert handling of weapons.

The character's mannerisms carry a quality of unpredictability. His voice frequently shifts in pitch, so that he speaks his dialogue hitting higher notes, followed by an immediate lower voice capable of landing two octaves below. Nolan acknowledges this unpredictability to be part of the character's slinky physical movements as well, saying that Ledger's performance is "always a surprise". About the Joker's physical appearance, Geoff Boucher wrote for the Los Angeles Times that the character probes the facial scars with his tongue and "walks with shoulders bowed and his chin out and down, like a hyena".

== Fictional character biography ==
=== Emergence in Batman Begins ===
At the end of Batman Begins (2005), GCPD Lieutenant James Gordon (Gary Oldman) tells Batman (Christian Bale) about a criminal with "a taste for the theatrical" who had recently committed a double homicide and an armed robbery and left behind a joker playing card.

=== Bank heist and the Mob ===
In the opening of The Dark Knight (2008), the Joker orchestrates a meticulously planned robbery of the mafia-owned Gotham National Bank, a money-laundering front for the city's crime families. Engineering a chain of betrayals among his accomplices, he ensures that each robber eliminates another until only "Bozo" remains—who then reveals himself to be the Joker—before escaping with the mob's money concealed in a school bus convoy.

Following the heist, the Joker interrupts a meeting of Gotham's crime bosses, including Sal Maroni (Eric Roberts), Gambol (Michael Jai White), and the Chechen (Ritchie Coster). Demonstrating his unpredictability and brutality, he kills Gambol's henchman with a pencil and offers to eliminate Batman for half of the mob's funds. Though initially dismissed, he warns them that corrupt Chinese accountant Lau (Chin Han) will betray them and reveals grenades hidden beneath his coat as leverage. After Gambol places a bounty on him, the Joker retaliates by murdering Gambol and coercing his remaining men into fighting to the death for a place in his gang.

=== Conflict with Batman ===
After Batman retrieves Lau from Hong Kong and secures his agreement to testify against the mob, Maroni and the Chechen reluctantly hire the Joker to kill Batman. The Joker kidnaps a Batman impersonator, murders him, and broadcasts a video in which he issues an ultimatum: unless Batman unmasks and surrenders, he will kill innocent people each day. When Batman refuses, the Joker carries out his threat by orchestrating the deaths of Judge Janet Surillo (Nydia Rodriguez Terracina) and Police Commissioner Gillian B. Loeb (Colin McFarlane).

The Joker and his gang later storm a fundraiser at Bruce Wayne's penthouse in an attempt to locate and kill Harvey Dent (Aaron Eckhart), Gotham City's newly elected district attorney who is leading the legal crusade against organized crime. When no one reveals Dent's whereabouts, the Joker threatens the guests until Dent's assistant DA and girlfriend Rachel Dawes (Maggie Gyllenhaal) intervenes, prompting Batman to confront him. The Joker escapes by throwing Rachel out a window, forcing Batman to save her.

The Joker attempts to assassinate Mayor Anthony Garcia (Nestor Carbonell) during Loeb's memorial. Disguised without makeup as an honor guard, he orchestrates a trap involving a sniper rifle and hidden gunmen, resulting in an apparent fatal shooting of Gordon while he protects Garcia. To stop the killings, Batman plans to reveal his secret identity, but Dent unexpectedly claims to be Batman and is arrested instead.

While Dent is being transported, the Joker and his gang ambush the GCPD convoy. They destroy most of the police vehicles, but when the Joker targets Dent's armored car, Batman intervenes to stop the attack. The Joker dares Batman to kill him, but Batman refuses and crashed his Batpod instead. As the Joker attempts to unmask him, Gordon—who had faked his death—holds a shotgun to his head, leading to the Joker's arrest and imprisonment at GCPD headquarters.

=== Assault on Gotham ===
When Dent is reported missing, Gordon, newly promoted to the Commissioner of the GCPD, allows Batman to brutally interrogate the Joker to find out where he is. The Joker reveals that his men have kidnapped both Dent and Rachel, and gives Batman their locations, while taunting him that he will only be able to save one. Unbeknownst to Batman, the Joker deliberately switched the addresses, anticipating that Batman would choose Rachel. As a result, Batman rescues Dent instead, while Rachel is killed. Dent, meanwhile, is horrifically disfigured, with half of his face burned off.

Meanwhile, the Joker detonates a phone-triggered bomb surgically planted inside one of his men, creating chaos within the GCPD and enabling his escape, taking Lau with him.

The Joker later meets the Chechen aboard a container ship alongside Lau, and is granted his reward: half of the Gotham City mob's money. The Joker douses the cash in gasoline and sets it on fire with the Chechen's cigar, burning the fortune with Lau left atop the pile. He then has the Chechen killed and assumes control of his gang.

The Joker calls in to a news program where Wayne Enterprises accountant Coleman Reese (Joshua Harto) is promising to reveal Batman's secret identity. The Joker threatens to blow up a hospital unless someone kills Reese within the hour.

=== Contact with Harvey Dent ===
During the mass evacuation of Gotham General Hospital, the Joker disguises himself as a nurse and enters Dent's hospital room. He convinces Dent, who has gone insane with grief over Rachel's death and his own disfigurement, to take revenge against those he holds responsible for his plight - Batman, Gordon, the mob, and the GCPD. Dent then goes on a homicidal rampage as the vigilante "Two-Face", killing Maroni, one of his men, and two corrupt GCPD officers.

After Dent breaks out of the hospital, the Joker detonates a series of hidden explosives, blowing up the building as he walks out of the door. He and his men then commandeer an evacuation bus and kidnap a television reporter (Anthony Michael Hall) and his crew as part of his escalating campaign of chaos in Gotham City.

=== The ferries and arrest ===
The Joker publicly announces that Gotham City would belong to him by the end of the night. He then told people that they can leave, but that anyone who leaves by the tunnel or the bridge would be "in for a surprise," which leads many fleeing Gotham citizens to opt for the ferries.

Two ferries immediately depart from the harbor: one full of civilians and the other transporting prisoners. However, before their departure, the Joker had arranged for both boats to be loaded with explosives, and hijacks the ferries' PA system and explains that, if neither ferry chooses to detonate the other by midnight, he will destroy both.

With help from Wayne Enterprises CEO Lucius Fox (Morgan Freeman), Batman traces the Joker to a construction site, where he uncovers another deception: the apparent hostages are actually the Joker's men, while the real captives have been disguised as clowns with unloaded guns taped to their hands. Batman fights both the Joker's henchmen and incoming SWAT teams to prevent them from killing the true hostages. He ultimately confronts the Joker, who briefly gains the upper hand and pins him to the scaffolding.

When neither ferry blows up the other, an enraged Joker attempts to trigger the explosives himself, but Batman disarms him using his wrist blades and threw him off the building. Batman saves the Joker's life by catching him with a grappling gun, leaving the Joker suspended upside down. Despite the failure of his plan, however, the Joker gloats that he has won "the battle for Gotham's soul" by corrupting Dent; he then laughs maniacally as the GCPD and a SWAT team takes him into custody.

In the film's climax, after Dent is killed while attempting to murder Gordon's son, Batman says he will take the blame for Dent's crimes so the public will remember him as a hero and believe that Gotham City is worth saving. Gordon protests, but ultimately goes along with the plan after Batman declares, "The Joker cannot win."

=== Absence in The Dark Knight Rises ===
The Joker is not mentioned in The Dark Knight Rises (2012) as Christopher Nolan felt it was "inappropriate" to acknowledge "a real-life tragedy" in referencing Heath Ledger's death. However, the film novelization by Greg Cox makes reference to the character while describing Blackgate Prison:

Now that the Dent Act had made it all but impossible to cop an insanity plea, it had replaced Arkham Asylum as the preferred location for imprisoning both convicted and suspected felons. The worst of the worst were sent here, except for the Joker, who, rumor had it, was locked away as Arkham's sole remaining inmate. Or perhaps he had escaped. Nobody was really sure.

== Reception ==
=== Announcement and early response ===
The casting decision surprised some and was seen as a controversial move at the time, receiving notable negative reactions on the Internet. Nolan remembered the cynicism he endured surrounding Ledger's casting, saying that "the whole world turned around and said 'What are you doing?' You know, Heath Ledger, Joker, didn't make any sense to people at all." In his 2016 book The Caped Crusade: Batman and the Rise of Nerd Culture, NPR contributor Glen Weldon recalled that fans were outraged over the choice of Ledger, due to his past roles in films such as Brokeback Mountain (2005).

However, with the first trailer released in 2007, the film and its portrayal of the Joker received very positive response from audiences and entertainment industry professionals alike. Mexican filmmaker Guillermo del Toro praised Ledger's performance, finding it "really, really edgy and scary". DC Comics writers Paul Dini and Jeph Loeb both chimed with their positive reactions. Loeb, who had been critical of Jack Nicholson's portrayal of the Joker in Tim Burton's 1989 film Batman, expressed his excitement for Ledger's interpretation, saying the casting felt "just about right. I eagerly anticipate more!"

=== Critical reception ===
"Heath Ledger is magnificent. The Joker, incarnated with chilling authority by the actor, is simply one of the most twisted and mesmerizing creeps in movie history."

— Richard Corliss, Time

Heath Ledger's portrayal of the Joker received universal acclaim, winning numerous posthumous awards for his performance, including the Academy Award for Best Supporting Actor, the Actor Award for Outstanding Performance by a Male Actor in a Supporting Role, the BAFTA Award for Best Actor in a Supporting Role, the Critics' Choice Movie Award for Best Supporting Actor, the Golden Globe Award for Best Supporting Actor in a Motion Picture, the Saturn Award for Best Supporting Actor, and a Best Actor International Award at the 2008 Australian Film Institute Awards.

"I can only speak superlatives of Ledger, who is mad-crazy-brilliant as the Joker", wrote Peter Travers of Rolling Stone, stating that the film is deeper than its predecessor, with a "deft" script that refuses to scrutinize the Joker with popular psychology. Travers praised the cast, saying each brings their "'A' game" to the film. Travers said Ledger moves the Joker away from Jack Nicholson's interpretation into darker territory, and expressed his support for any potential campaign to have Ledger nominated for an Academy Award. Roger Ebert of the Chicago Sun-Times stated that Heath Ledger's portrayal is a "key performance" and pondered whether he would become the first posthumous Academy Award-winning actor since Peter Finch in 1976.

Mark Dinning of Empire magazine called Ledger's performance "monumental" and wrote "The Dark Knight is Ledger's movie. It is a towering performance. ... A force of nature". Kevin Smith commented on Ledger, calling his "incredible" performance among "the most frightening, smart and well-played villains ever. Ever." Mark Lee, writing for The Daily Telegraph, commented that Ledger accomplished "a genuinely unsettling, brilliant nuanced portrait of evil". Tim Teeman commented for The Times that "Ledger is so terrifying and unpredictable that his very presence on screen makes you nervous." Total Film reviewed that Ledger is "burning brightly as he embodies an icon. ... This is the definitive Joker", calling the performance "a masterpiece". For The Hollywood Reporter, Kirk Honeycutt called Ledger's performance "a beauty". Entertainment Weekly put the film on its end-of-the-decade, "best-of" list, saying, "Every great hero needs a great villain. And in 2008, Christian Bale's Batman found his in Heath Ledger's demented dervish, the Joker." Emanuel Levy wrote Ledger "throws himself completely" into the role. David Denby of The New Yorker, otherwise critical of the film, praised Ledger's "sinister and frightening" performance, which he says is the film's one element of success. Denby called Ledger "mesmerising" and said, "His performance is a heroic, unsettling final act: this young actor looked into the abyss." "It's just one of the most iconic movie performances of modern times", declared chief film critic of Variety Scott Foundas. In 2009, Total Film issued its "The 150 Greatest Performances of All Time" list, ranking Ledgers' performance in The Dark Knight at 105th place.

Film critics, co-stars Maggie Gyllenhaal and Michael Caine, and many of Ledger's colleagues in the film community joined Christian Bale in calling for and predicting that he would receive a nomination for the Academy Award for Best Supporting Actor for his performance in The Dark Knight. At the 81st Academy Awards, honoring films of 2008, Ledger posthumously received and won the Academy Award for Best Supporting Actor.

== Legacy ==
In 2022, Clayton Davis of Variety ranked Ledger's portrayal as the Joker the best superhero movie performance in the past 50 years. Actors who have cited Ledger's performance as an inspiration for pursuing a career in acting include Timothée Chalamet and Jacob Elordi.

Ledger's Joker is referenced in The Office episode "Employee Transfer", in which Dwight Schrute, Creed Bratton, and Kevin Malone all dress up as the character for Halloween.

=== Influence on other characters ===
Bérénice Marlohe cited Ledger's performance as the Joker as an inspiration for her portrayal of Sévérine in the James Bond film Skyfall.

Seth Gabel was pitched to play Count Vertigo in Arrow as a character inspired by Ledger's Joker. To avoid simply imitating Ledger's performance, Gabel tried to find his own version of the level of freedom Ledger's Joker had, an intimate relationship to violence and psychosis of his own. Iwan Rheon admitted to have used Ledger's Joker as a reference for his performance as Ramsay Bolton in Game of Thrones.

In regards to Jesse Eisenberg's performance as Lex Luthor in the DC Extended Universe (DCEU) film Batman v Superman: Dawn of Justice, Ben Affleck compared Eisenberg's Luthor to Ledger's Joker, feeling that Luthor was the best character in the film due to being grounded to reality and that Eisenberg improved all of his scenes to the point of creating a "whole psychology" for Luthor instead of portraying him as a "one-dimensional" villain.

On playing N'Jadaka / Erik "Killmonger" Stevens in the Marvel Cinematic Universe (MCU) film Black Panther, Michael B. Jordan said that both Ledger's performance as the Joker, as well as Michael Fassbender's Magneto, motivated him to deliver the best performance he could.

Discussing his forthcoming portrayal as Kang the Conqueror in the MCU film Ant-Man and the Wasp: Quantumania in anticipation of his further appearances as the character in Avengers: The Kang Dynasty and Avengers: Secret Wars, fellow Marvel actor Jonathan Majors named Ledger's Joker as one of his inspirations to play the character.

To play the Tracker in John Wick: Chapter 4, Shamier Anderson studied Ledger's Joker due to both characters lacking a backstory.

In the final scene of Joker: Folie à Deux (2024), directed by Todd Phillips, the character Arthur Fleck, portrayed by Joaquin Phoenix, is fatally stabbed by a young inmate at Arkham State Hospital, portrayed by Connor Storrie. As Arthur lies dying, the inmate is seen in the background carving a Glasgow smile into his own face with a shank. The ending was met with widespread negative reactions, as many critics and viewers rejected the idea that Storrie's character represents the "real" Joker. However, Phillips has clearly stated that this film series does not exist within the same universe as Nolan's The Dark Knight trilogy, or any other media.

On designing the werewolf character Dan Kiel in his 2025 supernatural horror film film Wolf Man, Leigh Whannell said that despite all werewolf designs across cinema, his biggest inspiration was Ledger's Joker.

== See also ==
- Joker in other media
  - Joker (Jack Napier)
- Barack Obama "Joker" poster
- Georgia Joker
