= Gus Lewis =

American actor (born 1993)

- Born: January 19, 1993 (age 33)
- Occupation: Actor
- Years active: 2005–2012
- Known for: Batman Begins

Gus Lewis (born January 19, 1993) is an American actor. He is best known for playing the young Bruce Wayne in the 2005 film Batman Begins, co-starring with Christian Bale and Michael Caine. That year, he also co-starred in the film Asylum alongside Hugh Bonneville and Natasha Richardson.

== Career ==
In 2005, Lewis played a young Bruce Wayne in the film Batman Begins, whose adult counterpart was Christian Bale. The American Academy of Child and Adolescent Psychiatry observed that Lewis played "an intense and appealing" child, while Orlando Weekly opined that the actor "makes a strong impression as the 8-year-old Bruce, leaving a firm foundation for Bale's haunted-scion act."

Lewis played Charlie Raphael in the 2005 drama film Asylum, the son of characters played by Hugh Bonneville and Natasha Richardson. The Washington Times' Gary Arnold observed that Lewis portrayed the only sympathetic person in the film. For the film, Lewis had to perform a stunt involving the near drowning of his character. While they used a nine-year-old stunt child for the wider shots, the close-ups used Lewis and his co-star Rhydian Jones. Lewis' mother was constantly nearby during its filming.

Lewis appeared as Matthew Couillard, a real-life person who survived a deadly snowstorm while skiing in Turkey with his father, in a 2006 episode of the documentary television series I Shouldn't Be Alive. In 2008, Lewis worked on the dramatised documentary The Shooting of Thomas Hurndall, which depicted the real-life story of a young peace activist who is killed in Israel. In 2012, Lewis appeared in the short film The End, which won Best Film at HollyShorts Film Festival, and the Award of Merit at the Lucerne International Film Festival.

== Filmography ==
=== Film ===
Year	Title	Role	Notes
2005	Asylum	Charlie Raphael	
2005	Batman Begins	Bruce Wayne - age 8	
2009	One for Sorrow	Student 3	Short film
2012	The End	Jamie	Short film
2012	The Dark Knight Rises	Bruce Wayne - age 8	Archive footage; uncredited

=== Television ===
Year	Title	Role	Notes
2006	I Shouldn't Be Alive	Matthew Couillard	Episode: "Ice Cave Survivor"
2008	The Shooting of Thomas Hurndall	Freddy	Television film
