= The Man Who Falls =

1989 comic book story

- Cover of Secret Origins of the World's Greatest Super-Heroes (1989), trade paperback edition, art by Brian Bolland.
- Publisher: DC Comics
- Publication date: 1989
- Genre: Superhero
- Title(s): Secret Origins

Creative team
- Writer: Dennis O'Neil
- Artist: Dick Giordano
- Secret Origins of the World's Greatest Super-Heroes: ISBN 0-930289-50-1

"The Man Who Falls" is a 1989 comic book story by Dennis O'Neil and Dick Giordano. It is an overview of Bruce Wayne's early life, including his parents' murder, his time spent traveling and training throughout the world, and his return to Gotham City to become Batman.

== Publication history ==
The comic was initially published as the only original story in the Secret Origins trade paperback collection.

It was later included in the 2007 trade paperback, Batman: Secrets of the Batcave.

== Plot ==
"The Man Who Falls" consists of a series of concentrated retellings of previously published Batman stories, including Detective Comics #33, which includes Gardner Fox and Bob Kane's first version of Batman's origin.

O'Neil's story begins with a young Bruce Wayne falling down a hole on the grounds of Wayne Manor. Bats begin to swarm towards him and out the hole. Bruce's father, Dr. Thomas Wayne, rescues Bruce but chastises him for his carelessness, while Bruce's mother, Martha Wayne, comforts him. When Bruce asks if he was in Hell, she reassures him it "was just some old cave". The story then cuts to the murder of Bruce's parents and him kneeling at their dead bodies. The layouts of this version of the Waynes' murder is designed to resemble Frank Miller's Batman: Year One.

At the age of 14, Bruce leaves Gotham City to explore and obtain skills in martial arts and forensics. Scenes of his early training as a teenager are depicted, including experiences with college, and a disillusioning experience in working with the FBI upon turning 20. He realizes that to achieve justice the way he sees fit, he cannot work "within a system". The story next turns to Bruce's foreign travels, one extended scene depicts Bruce's time training at a monastery, hidden in a mountainous region of Korea. After nearly a year of training, Master Kirigi tells Bruce he has exceptional intelligence and physique, but his traumatic past has made him self-destructive.

Bruce Wayne leaves Korea and heads to France, where O'Neil summarizes events from Sam Hamm's Batman: Blind Justice. Bruce trains with a bounty hunter named Henri Ducard, who shows him "the uses of brutality, deception [and] cunning". When Ducard kills a fugitive he had been tracking one night, Bruce abandons his training, disgusted.

The narration explains that Bruce meets and learns from every great detective in the world, when he approaches Willie Doggett. Summarizing events from O'Neil's own Legends of the Dark Knight story, "Shaman", Bruce (now 23) and Doggett track down a man named Tom Woodley to a mountain ledge, where Woodley shoots and kills Doggett. Woodley himself falls from a precipice. Bruce, without food or warmth, wanders the snowy mountains. After falling unconscious, he is rescued by a Native American shaman. When Bruce awakens, the old man tells Bruce he has the mark of the bat, an animal sacred in his tribe.

Bruce returns to Gotham to begin his crime-fighting career. O'Neil again recounts events from Year One: Bruce's first night out, fighting street thugs while still uncostumed, is deemed a failure. While brooding in the library of Wayne Manor that night, a bat crashes through the study window. Modeling himself after the recurring images of bats, Bruce creates his costumed identity: the Batman.

In a framing device, in the present day the Batman observes a gang of criminals while positioned on a gargoyle, with his musings as he prepares to confront them providing the flashbacks to the formative moments of his development. Once ready, he leaps off the gargoyle, the narration commenting that he will keep falling "for the rest of his life".

== Continuity ==
"The Man Who Falls" uses parts of Year One, Blind Justice and the first arc of Legends of the Dark Knight (Shaman) as part of the story. All these make up the training and first months of Batman's career. Later stories by Matt Wagner, Batman and the Monster Men and Batman and the Mad Monk, depict the emergence of Batman as a major presence in Gotham.

Jeph Loeb and Tim Sale's maxi-series Batman: The Long Halloween and Batman: Dark Victory depict the latter part of Year Two and part of Year Three (Long Halloween), and conclude the character arcs with Dark Victory during the "Year Four" time frame.

== In other media ==
"The Man Who Falls" storyline served as an influence for Christopher Nolan's 2005 film Batman Begins. While playing at Wayne Manor, a young Bruce Wayne falls down a dry well and is attacked by a swarm of bats. He is eventually rescued by his father. After his parents' murders, Bruce decides to leave Gotham and spends his young adult years travelling to foreign countries. He is later trained by a martial arts expert at a monastery located in the mountains of Korea. At one point, Bruce is trained by Henri Ducard, but abandons him when Ducard encourages Bruce to take the law into his own hands by killing criminals. After several years, Bruce returns to Gotham and starts his crime-fighting career as Batman. In this version, Ducard is an alter-ego of Ra's al Ghul.
