= DC Comics – The Legend of Batman =

American series of graphic novels

DC Comics - The Legend of Batman
- Editor: Ben Robinson
- Frequency: Fortnightly
- Format: Hardback book format
- First issue: 2017
- Company: Eaglemoss Collections
- Country: United Kingdom
- Language: English
- Website: Official Website
- ISSN: 2514-9822

DC Comics – The Legend of Batman was a fortnightly partwork magazine published by Eaglemoss Collections and DC Comics. In 2024, FanHome—a popular subscription based collectible company—announced they would begin rereleasing Eaglemoss's original books and release new content with the collection. The series was a collection of special edition hardback graphic novels, that tell Batman's life story from beginning to end. The series follows the success of the DC Comics Graphic Novel Collection, which itself began in 2015 with the Batman story Hush.

The collection started in countries like France, but with a different order and contents. The debut issue, Batman: Zero Year Part 1, was released in the U.K. on 27 December 2017 at the special price of £1.99 and £6.99 for the first order (including 1 free book), before rising to £9.99 per issue. In February 2019 the price was increased to £10.99 and August 2020 saw another increase to £11.99 (post Brexit).

In January 2021, Eaglemoss Collections notified subscribers that, due to its success, the collection would be extended to 100 issues.

In September 2021, a flyer was included with issue #98 ("Blood of Heroes") that confirmed a further extension of 20 issues, bringing the collection to 120 books. Of which is only available if you resubscribe and not in stores (mentioned on their website).

Eaglemoss announced they were bankrupt on 11 July 2022, the Webshop is no longer accessible and to date there have been no new subscription deliveries since December 2021. Due to this, issues 106-116 have never been released; the final release was issue 105.

== List of books ==
=== Eaglemoss regular issues ===
Below is a list of the books which were released as part of the initial Eaglemoss collection.

Issue/Volume	Chronological Order	Title	Pt	Collected material	Release date
1	1	Batman: Zero Year	1	Batman (vol. 2) #21–26	27 December 2017
2	2	Batman: Zero Year	2	Batman (vol. 2) #27, 29–33	10 January 2018
3	57	Born to Kill		Batman and Robin (vol. 2) #1–8	24 January 2018
4	55	Faces of Death		Detective Comics (vol. 2) #1–7	7 February 2018
5	79	The Dark Knight Returns		The Dark Knight Returns #1–4	21 February 2018
6	53	The Court of Owls		Batman (vol. 2) #1–7	7 March 2018
7	54	The City of Owls		Batman (vol. 2) #8–12	21 March 2018
8	40	Batman Reborn		Batman and Robin (vol. 1) #1–6	4 April 2018
9	48	Golden Dawn		Batman: The Dark Knight (vol. 1) #1–5	18 April 2018
10	28	Joker		Joker	2 May 2018
11	75	Endgame		Batman (vol. 2) #35–40	16 May 2018
12	31	Detective		Detective Comics #821–824, 826	30 May 2018
13	59	Knight Terrors		Batman: The Dark Knight (vol. 2) #1–8	13 June 2018
14	58	Pearl		Batman and Robin (vol. 2) #0, 9–14	27 June 2018
15	5	Haunted Knight		Legends of the Dark Knight Halloween Special #1 – Choices, #2 – Madness, #3 – Ghosts	11 July 2018
16	37	Private Casebook		Detective Comics #841–845	25 July 2018
17	39	R.I.P.		Batman #676–681	8 August 2018
18	4	Prey		Legends of the Dark Knight #11–15	22 August 2018
19	67	Graveyard Shift		Batman (vol. 2) #18–20, 34, Annual #2; Detective Comics (vol. 2) #27	5 September 2018
20	41	Batman vs. Robin		Batman and Robin (vol. 1) #7–12	19 September 2018
21	6	Dark Victory	1	Batman: Dark Victory #0–6	3 October 2018
22	7	Dark Victory	2	Batman: Dark Victory #7–13	17 October 2018
23	61	Death of the Family	1	Batman (vol. 2) #13–15; Catwoman (vol. 4) #13–14; Nightwing (vol. 3) #15	31 October 2018
24	62	Death of the Family	2	Nightwing (vol. 3) #16; Batman (vol. 2) #16–17; Batman and Robin (vol. 2) #15–17	14 November 2018
25	45	Batman and Robin Must Die		Batman and Robin (vol. 1) #13–16; Batman: The Return #1	28 November 2018
26	10	Batman Neal Adams	1	Batman stories from World's Finest Comics #175–176 and The Brave and the Bold #79–84	12 December 2018
27	52	Gates of Gotham		Batman: Gates of Gotham #1–5; Detective Comics Annual #12; Batman Annual #28	26 December 2018
28	60	Cycle of Violence		Batman: The Dark Knight (vol. 2) #0, 10–15	9 January 2019
29	76	Superheavy		Batman (vol. 2) #41–46, Annual #4; "The Rookie" story from Divergence FCBD Special Edition #1	23 January 2019
30	77	Bloom		Batman (vol. 2) #47–52	6 February 2019
31	50	Black Mirror	1	Detective Comics #871–875	20 February 2019
32	66	Requiem for Damien		Batman and Robin (vol. 2) #18–23	6 March 2019
33	11	Batman Neal Adams	2	The Brave and the Bold #85–86, 93; Detective Comics #395, 397, 400, 402, 404, 408; Batman #219	20 March 2019
34	8	The Man Who Laughs & The Killing Joke		Batman: The Man Who Laughs; Batman: The Killing Joke	3 April 2019
35	26	Officer Down		Batman #587; Robin #86; Birds of Prey (vol. 1) #27; Catwoman #90; Nightwing #53; Detective Comics #754; Batman: Gotham Knights #13	17 April 2019
36	51	Black Mirror	2	Detective Comics #876–881	1 May 2019
37	43	Time and the Batman		Batman #682–683, 700–702	15 May 2019
38	44	The Return of Bruce Wayne		Batman: The Return of Bruce Wayne #1–6	29 May 2019
39	16	Knightfall: Prologue		Batman: Sword of Azrael #1–4; Batman #488; Batman: Vengeance of Bane #1	16 June 2019
40	17	Knightfall	1	Batman #489–494; Detective Comics #659–660	30 June 2019
41	18	Knightfall	2	Batman #495–497; Detective Comics #661–664	14 July 2019
42	19	Knightfall	3	Batman #498–500; Detective Comics #665–666; Showcase '93 #7–8	28 July 2019
43	73	The Hunt for Robin		Batman and Robin (vol. 2) #29–34; Robin Rises: Omega #1	11 August 2019
44	12	Batman Neal Adams	3	Detective Comics #410; Batman #232, 234, 237, 243–245, 251, 255	25 August 2019
45	33	Death and The City		Detective Comics #827–828, 831, 833–834, 837	8 September 2019
46	63	Emperor Penguin	1	Detective Comics (vol. 2) #13–17	22 September 2019
47	70	Emperor Penguin	2	Detective Comics (vol. 2) #18–21	6 October 2019
48	64	Demon Star		Batman Incorporated (vol. 2) #0–5	20 October 2019
49	65	Gotham's Most Wanted		Batman Incorporated (vol. 2) #6–10, 12–13	3 November 2019
50	72	The Big Burn		Batman and Robin (vol. 2) #24–28, Annual #2	10 November 2019
51	15	A Lonely Place of Dying		Batman #440–442; The New Titans #60–61	24 November 2019
52	74	Robin Rises		Batman and Robin (vol. 2) #35–40; Robin Rises: Alpha #1	15 December 2019
53	3	Year One		Batman #404–407; Batman Chronicles #19	29 December 2019
54	20	Cataclysm	1	Detective Comics #719–720; Shadow of the Bat #73; Nightwing #19; Batman #553; Azrael #40; Catwoman #56	8 January 2020
55	21	Cataclysm	2	Batman #554; Nightwing #20; Shadow of the Bat #74; Robin #52; Batman Chronicles #12; Batman: Blackgate – Isle of Men #1	29 January 2020
56	22	Cataclysm	3	Batman: Spoiler / Huntress – Blunt Trauma #1; Catwoman #57; Detective Comics #721; Robin #53; Batman: Arkham Asylum – Tales of Madness #1	9 February 2020
57	34	The Resurrection of Ra's al Ghul	1	Batman #670, Annual #26; Robin #168, Annual #7; Nightwing #138	16 February 2020
58	35	The Resurrection of Ra's al Ghul	2	Batman #671; Robin #169; Nightwing #139; Detective Comics #838–840	8 March 2020
59	23	No Man's Land	1	Batman: No Man’s Land #1; Shadow of the Bat #83, 87; Legends of the Dark Knight #119; Detective Comics #730, 734; Batman #563, 567	22 March 2020
60	24	No Man's Land	2	Shadow of the Bat #88; Legends of the Dark Knight #120; Detective Comics #735–736, 738–739; Batman #568, 571–572	2 April 2020
61	25	No Man's Land	3	Shadow of the Bat #93–94; Legends of the Dark Knight #125–126; Detective Comics #740–741; Batman #573–574	16 April 2020
62	46	Batman Incorporated	1	Batman Incorporated (vol. 1) #1–5	30 April 2020
63	68	Mad		Batman: The Dark Knight (vol. 2) #16–21, Annual #1	9 July 2020
64	47	Batman Incorporated	2	Batman Incorporated (vol. 1) #6–8; Batman Incorporated: Leviathan Strikes #1	23 July 2020
65	69	Clay		Batman: The Dark Knight (vol. 2) #22–29	6 August 2020
66	29	Under the Red Hood		Batman #645–650, Annual #25	20 August 2020
67	30	Face the Face		Detective Comics #817–820; Batman #651–654	3 September 2020
68	49	The House of Hush		Batman: Streets of Gotham #14–21	17 September 2020
69	9	Terror		Batman: Legends of the Dark Knight #137–141	1 October 2020
70	13	The Wrath		Batman Special #1; Batman Confidential #13–16	15 October 2020
71	78	Damian - Son of Batman		Damian: Son of Batman #1–4; Batman #666	29 October 2020
72	80	Year 100		Batman: Year 100 #1–4	12 November 2020
73	38	Heart of Hush		Detective Comics #846–850	26 November 2020
74	42	Streets of Gotham		Batman: Streets of Gotham #1–4, 7, 10–11	10 December 2020
75	56	Scare Tactics		Detective Comics (vol. 2) #8–12, Annual #1	24 December 2020
76	27	Blink		Batman: Legends of the Dark Knight #156–158, 164–167	7 January 2021
77	71	Gothtopia		Detective Comics (vol. 2) #25–29	21 January 2021
78	32	Batman and Son		Batman #655–658, 663–665	4 February 2021
79	36	Black Glove		Batman #667–669, 672–675	18 February 2021
80	14	A Death In The Family		Batman #426–429	4 March 2021
81	81	Dark Detective		Batman: Dark Detective #1–6	18 March 2021
82	82	Knightquest	1	Batman #501–505; Catwoman (vol. 3) #6–7; Batman: Shadow of the Bat #25	1 April 2021
83	83	Knightquest	2	Batman #506–508; Batman: Shadow of the Bat #26–28; Detective Comics #674–675	15 April 2021
84	84	Knightquest	3	Justice League Task Force #5-6; Batman: Shadow of the Bat #21–23; Batman: Legends of the Dark Knight #59–61	29 April 2021
85	85	KnightsEnd	1	Robin #7; Batman #509; Batman: Shadow of the Bat #29; Detective Comics #676; Batman: Legends of the Dark Knight #62	13 May 2021
86	86	KnightsEnd	2	Robin #8-9; Catwoman #12; Batman #510; Batman: Shadow of the Bat #30; Detective Comics #677; Batman: Legends of the Dark Knight #63; Showcase 94 #10	27 May 2021
87	87	Prodigal	1	Robin #0, 11; Batman #512–513; Batman: Shadow of the Bat #32; Detective Comics #679	10 June 2021
88	88	Prodigal	2	Batman: Shadow of the Bat #33–34; Detective Comics #680–681; Robin #12–13; Batman #514	24 June 2021
89	89	Troika		Robin #14; Batman #515; Batman: Shadow of the Bat #35; Detective Comics #682; Nightwing: Alfred's Return; Batman: Vengeance Of Bane II	8 July 2021
90	90	Contagion	1	Batman: Shadow of the Bat #48–49; Detective Comics #695; Robin #27; Catwoman #31; Azrael #15; Batman #529	22 July 2021
91	91	Contagion	2	Detective Comics #696; The Batman Chronicles #4; Catwoman #32; Azrael #16; Robin #28–29	5 August 2021
92	92	Contagion	3	Robin #30; Batman #530–532; Batman: Shadow of the Bat #50–52	19 August 2021
93	93	Legacy	1	Detective Comics #697–699; Catwoman #33–35; Batman: Shadow of the Bat #53	2 September 2021
94	94	Legacy	2	Batman #533; Detective Comics #700; Batman: Bane of the Demon #1–4	23 September 2021
95	95	Legacy	3	Catwoman #36; Robin #32–33; Batman: Shadow of the Bat #54; Batman #534; Detective Comics #701–702; Batman: Bane #1	7 October 2021
96	96	Icarus		Detective Comics (vol. 2) #30–34; Detective Comics Annual (vol. 2) #3	21 October 2021
97	97	Anarky		Detective Comics (vol. 2) #35–40; Detective Comics: Endgame #1; Detective Comics: Futures End #1	4 November 2021
98	98	The Blood of Heroes		Detective Comics (vol. 2) #41–47	18 November 2021
99	99	Gordon at War		Detective Comics (vol. 2) #48–52	2 December 2021
100	100	The Dark Knight Strikes Again		The Dark Knight Strikes Again #1–3	16 December 2021
101	101	Venom		Batman: Legends of the Dark Knight #16–20	TBC
102	102	Blind Justice		Detective Comics #598–600	TBC
103	103	Monsters		Batman: Legends of the Dark Knight #71–73, 83–84, 89–90	TBC
104	104	Battle for the Cowl			
105	105	Long Shadows		Batman #687–691	
106	106	Life After Death			
107	107	Arkham Reborn			
108	108	King Tut's Tomb			
109	109	Ghosts			
110	110	As the Crow Flies			
111	111	Knight Out	1		
112	112	Knight Out	2		
113	113	The Cult			
114	114	Eye Of The Beholder			
115	115	Ten Nights of the Beast			
116	116	Kings of Fear			

=== Eaglemoss special issues ===
The following 'special' books were released as part of the initial Eaglemoss collection with a UK retail price of £19.99. Subscribers get the Special issues at a discounted price of £18.99.

Issue number	Title	Pt	Collecting	Release date	Ref.
Special 1	Batman Eternal	1	Batman Eternal #1–13	5 May 2018	
Special 2	Batman Eternal	2	Batman Eternal #14–26	25 July 2018	
Special 3	Batman Eternal	3	Batman Eternal #27–39	19 September 2018	
Special 4	Batman Eternal	4	Batman Eternal #40–52; Batman (vol. 2) #28	16 December 2018	
Special 5	Batman and Robin Eternal	1	Batman and Robin Eternal #1–12; Batman Endgame Special Edition #1	10 March 2019	
Special 6	Batman and Robin Eternal	2	Batman and Robin Eternal #13–26	1 May 2019	
Special 7	The Batman Adventures	1	The Batman Adventures #1–12	4 September 2019	
Special 8	The Batman Adventures	2	The Batman Adventures #13–24	27 November 2019	
Special 9	The Batman Adventures	3	The Batman Adventures #25–36	16 February 2020	
Special 10	Batman: War Games	1	Detective Comics #790–796; Robin #126–127; Batgirl (vol. 1) #53	13 May 2020	
Special 11	Batman: War Games	2	Robin #128–129; Batman: The 12-Cent Adventure #1; Detective Comics #797–798; Batman: Legends of the Dark Knight #182–183; Nightwing #96; Batman; Gotham Knights #56; Batgirl (vol. 1) #55; Catwoman (vol. 3) #34; Batman #631	27 July 2020	
Special 12	Batman: War Games	3	Nightwing #97–98; Batman; Gotham Knights #57–58; Robin #130; Batgirl (vol. 1) #56–57; Catwoman (vol. 3) #35; Batman #632; Detective Comics #799; Batman: Legends of the Dark Knight #184	27 October 2020	
Special 13	Batman: War Games	4	Catwoman (vol. 3) #36; Batman #633–634, 642–644; Detective Comics #800, 809–810; Batman Villains Secret Files and Origins 2005; Batman Allies Secret Files and Origins 2005	4 January 2021	
Special 14	Batman: Black and White	1	Batman: Black And White (vol 1) #1–4; Batman: Black And White (vol 2); backup stories from Batman: Gotham Knights #1–16	13 April 2021	
Special 15	Batman: Black and White	2	Backup stories from Batman: Gotham Knights #17–49	28 June 2021	
Special 16	Batman: Black and White	3	Batman: Black and White #1–6	13 September 2021	
Special 17	Shadow of the Bat	1	Shadow of the Bat #1–12		
Special 18	Shadow of the Bat	2			
Special 19	Shadow of the Bat	3			

=== Eaglemoss subscriber exclusive issues ===
The initial Eaglemoss collection offered subscribers the opportunity to receive additional gifts throughout the collection by paying £1 extra per volume. The exclusive Legends of Batman books were issued every 20 issues over the course of the collection.

Issue number	Title	Part	Collecting	Release date
Upsell 1	Bruce Wayne: Murderer?	01	Detective Comics #742–753; Batman: Turning Points #1–5	19 September 2018
Upsell 2	Bruce Wayne: Murderer?	02	Detective Comics #755–766; Batman: The 10-Cent Adventure #1; Nightwing #65; Batgirl (vol. 1) #24, Superman (vol. 2) #168; Robin #98; Batman: Gotham Knight #25; Birds of Prey (vol. 1) #39	16 July 2019
Upsell 3	Bruce Wayne: Fugitive	01	Detective Comics #767–770; Batman #599–602; Nightwing #66–68; Batgirl (vol. 1) #27; Batman: Gotham Knights #26–29; Robin #99; Birds of Prey #40–41	5 May 2020
Upsell 4	Bruce Wayne: Fugitive	02	Nightwing #69; Birds of Prey #43; Batman #603–607; Detective Comics #771–775; Batgirl (vol. 1) #29, 33; Batman: Gotham Knights #30–32; Azrael: Agent of the Bat #91–92	4 March 2021
Upsell 5	The Dark Knight III: The Master Race		The Dark Knight III: The Master Race #1–9	22 October 2021

=== FanHome regular issues ===
Below is a list of the books which have been released as part of the FanHome rereleased collection.

Issue/Volume	Chronological Order	Title	Pt	Collected material
1	1	Zero Year	1	Batman (vol. 2) #21–26
2	2	Zero Year	2	Batman (vol. 2) #27, 29–33
3	65	Batman and Son		Batman #655–658, 663–665
4	56	Hush	1	Batman #608–613
5	57	Hush	2	Batman #614–619
6	10	The Long Halloween	1	Batman: The Long Halloween #1–6
7	11	The Long Halloween	2	Batman: The Long Halloween #7–13
8	28	The Killing Joke		Batman: The Killing Joke; The Batman Chronicles #5; Booster Gold #5; The Brave and the Bold #33; The Joker #10
9	119	The Dark Knight Returns		The Dark Knight #1–4
10	81	The Court of Owls		Batman (vol. 2) #1–7
11	82	The City of Owls		Batman (vol. 2) #8–12 and Annual #1
12	47	JLA: Tower of Babel		JLA #43-46 and JLA Secret Files & Origins #3
13	109	The War of Jokes and Riddles		Batman (vol. 3) #25–32
14	20	Tales of the Demon		Detective Comics #411, 485, 489–490; Batman #232, 235, 240, 242-244; DC Special Series #15
15	4	Batman & The Monster Men		Batman & The Monster Men #1–6
16	68	The Black Glove		Batman #667–669, 672–675
17	71	Batman Reborn		Batman & Robin #1–6
18	6	Prey		Batman: Legends of the Dark Knight #11–15
19	106	I Am Gotham		Batman Rebirth #1; Batman (vol. 3) #1–6
20	18	Neal Adams	1	World's Finest Comics #175–176; The Brave and the Bold #79–84
21	78	Black Mirror	1	Detective Comics #871–875
22	83	Faces of Death		Detective Comics (vol. 2) #1–7
23	14	Dark Victory	1	Dark Victory #0–6
24	15	Dark Victory	2	Dark Victory #7–13
25	86	Death of the Family	1	Batman (vol. 2) #13–15; Catwoman (vol. 4) #13–14; Nightwing (vol. 3) #15
26	87	Death of the Family	2	Nightwing (vol. 2) #16; Batman (vol. 2) #16–17; Batman and Robin (vol. 2) #16–17
27	107	I am Suicide		Batman (vol. 3) #9–15
28	66	The Resurrection of Ra's al Ghul	1	Batman #670, Annual #26; Robin #168, Annual #7; Nightwing #138
29	67	The Resurrection of Ra's al Ghul	2	Batman #671; Robin #169; Nightwing #139; Detective Comics #838–840
30	29	Knightfall: Prologue		Sword of Azrael #1–4; Batman #488; Vengeance of Bane #1
31	30	Knightfall	1	Batman #489–494; Detective Comics #659–660
32	31	Knightfall	2	Batman #495–497; Detective Comics #661–664
33	32	Knightfall	3	Batman #498–500; Detective Comics #665–666; Showcase '93 #7–8
34	108	I Am Bane		Batman #16–20, 23–24; Batman Annual #1
35	12	Haunted Knight		Batman: Legends of the Dark Knight Halloween Special #1; Batman: Madness - A Legends of the Dark Knight Halloween Special; Batman: Ghosts - A Legends of the Dark Knight Halloween Special
36	21	Birth of the Demon	1	Son of the Demon; Bride of the Demon
37	22	Birth of the Demon	2	Birth Of The Demon
38	64	Under The Red Hood		Batman #645–650; Batman Annual #25
39	76	Batman Incorporated	1	Batman Incorporated #1–5
40	33	Knightquest	1	Batman #501–505; Catwoman #6–7; Shadow Of The Bat #25
41	34	Knightquest	2	Batman #506–508; Shadow Of The Bat #26–28; Detective Comics #674–675
42	35	Knightquest	3	Justice League Task Force #5–6; Shadow Of The Bat #21–23; Batman: Legends Of The Dark Knight #59–61
43	69	Private Casebook		Detective Comics #841–845; "KCIRT RO TAERT" from Infinite Halloween Special #1
44	77	Batman Incorporated	2	Batman Incorporated #6–8; Batman Incorporated: Leviathan Strikes #1
45	16	Terror		Batman: Legends Of The Dark Knight #137–141
46	110	The Rules Of Engagement		Batman #33–37; Batman Annual #2
47	17	Trinity		Trinity #1–3
48	3	Year One		Batman #404–407; Batman Chronicles #19
49	36	Knightsend	1	Robin #7; Batman #509; Shadow Of The Bat #29; Detective Comics #676; Batman: Legends Of The Dark Knight #62
50	37	Knightsend	2	Robin #8–9; Catwoman #12; Batman #510; Batman: Shadow Of The Bat #30; Detective Comics #677; Batman: Legends Of The Dark Knight #63; Showcase '94 #10
51	111	Bride Or Burglar?		Batman #38–44
52	5	Batman And The Mad Monk		Batman And The Mad Monk #1–6
53	19	Neal Adams	2	The Brave And the Bold #85–86, #93; Detective Comics #395, #397, #400, #402, #404, #407, #408; Batman #219
54	48	Bruce Wayne: Murderer?	1	Detective Comics #742–749
55	49	Bruce Wayne: Murderer?	2	Detective Comics #750–753; Turning Points #1–5
56	50	Bruce Wayne: Murderer?	3	Detective Comics #755–762; Superman #168
57	51	Bruce Wayne: Murderer?	4	Detective Comics #763–766; Batman: The 10-Cent Adventure #1; Nightwing #65; Batgirl #24; Robin #98; Batman: Gotham Knights #25; Birds Of Prey #39
58	112	Batman: The Wedding		Batman #45–50
59	70	Batman R.I.P.		Batman #676–681
60	84	Batman And Robin: Born To Killl		Batman And Robin #1–8
61	91	Batman: Graveyard Shift		Batman #18–20 & #34; Batman Annual #2; "Twenty Seven," from Detective Comics #27
62	113	Batman: Cold Days		Batman #51–57
63	23	Strange Apparitions		Batman #468, #471–476, #478–479, #481
64	38	Batman: Prodigal	1	Robin #0, #11; Batman #512–513; Shadow Of The Bat #32; Detective Comics #679
65	39	Batman: Prodigal	2	Shadow Of The Bat #33–34; Detective Comics #680–681; Robin #12–13; Batman #514
66	40	Troika		Robin #14; Batman #515: Shadow Of The Bat #35; Detective Comics #682; Nightwing: Alfred's Return #1; Batman: Vengeance Of Bane #2
67	114	The Tyrant Wing		Batman #58–60; Batman Annual #3; Batman Secret Files #1

=== FanHome special issues ===
The following 'special' books were released as part of the FanHome collection.

Issue Number	Title	Collecting
Special 1	Flashpoint	Flashpoint #1-5; The Flash #139; Batman: Knight of Vengeance #1–3; Flashpoint: Deadman and the Flying Greysons #1–3
Special 2	Year One: Robin & Batgirl	Robin: Year One #1–4; Batgirl: Year One #1–9
Special 3	Catwoman: Her Sister's Keeper/When In Rome	Catwoman #1–4; Catwoman: When in Rome #1–6
Special 4	Trinity War/Forever Evil	Trinty of Sin: Pandora #1; Justice League #22–23; Justice League of America #6-7; Justice League Dark #22–23; Forever Evil #1–7
Special 5	Nightwing: Year One/The Great Leap	Nightwing #101–106, #147–153
Special 6	Kingdom Come/The Kingdom	Kingdom Come #1–4; The Kingdom #1–2
Special 7	Dark Knights Metal/Dark Knights Rising	Dark Knights Metal #1–6; Batman: The Red Death #1; Batman: The Devastator #1; Batman: The Merciless #1; Batman: The Murder Machine #1; Batman: The Drowned #1; Batman: The Dawnbreaker #1; The Batman Who Laughs #1; Dark Knights Rising: The Wild Hunt #1
Special 8	Battle For the Cowl	Batman: Battle For The Cowl #1–3; Batman: Battle For The Cowl: Arkham Asylum #1; Batman: Battle For The Cowl: Commissioner Gordon #1; Batman: Battle For The Cowl: Man-Bat #1; Batman: Battle For The Cowl: The Network #1; Batman: Battle For The Cowl: The Underground #1; Gotham Gazette: Batman Dead? #1; Gotham Gazette: Batman Alive? #1; Azrael: Death's Dark Knight #1–3; Oracle: The Cure #1–3; Secret Six #9
Special 9	Catwoman by Brubaker	Catwoman #1–11
Special 10	Crisis on Infinite Earths	Crisis On Infinite Earths #1–12
Special 11	Infinity Crisis	
Special 12	Final Crisis	
Special 13	Identity Crisis	
Special 14	Gotham Central 1	
Special 15	Gotham Central 2	
Special 16	Gotham Central 3	
Standalone	Batman Cover Art: 1939 - 2017	An oversized hardback book featuring the cover art from a selection of 100 Batman comics published between 1939–2017

=== Fanhome Premium Issues ===
The following books were included for an extra fee of £1.25 on each regular issue.

Issue Number	Title	Collecting
Premium 1	Batman in the Golden and Silver Age 1	Batman #1, #35, #49, #62, #81, #121, #139, #180; Detective Comics #27, #31–33, #36, #38, #58, #66, #74, #110, #140, #168, #233, #267, #298; Justice League Of America #21; World's Finest #88, #94
Premium 2	Batman in the Golden and Silver Age 2	
Premium 3	Batman in the Bronze Age 1	
Premium 4	Batman in the Bronze Age 2	
Premium 5	Batman in the Dark Age 1	
Premium 6	Batman in the Dark Age 2	
Premium 7	Batman in the Modern Age 1	
Premium 8	Batman in the Modern Age 2	
