= DC Comics Graphic Novel Collection =

American series of graphic novels

- Frequency: Fortnightly
- Format: Hardback book format
- First issue: 2015-2021 (Incomplete)
- Company: Eaglemoss Collections
- Country: United Kingdom
- Language: English

DC Comics Graphic Novel Collection was a fortnightly partwork magazine published by Eaglemoss Collections and DC Comics in the UK. The series was a collection of special edition hardback graphic novels, collecting significant DC Comics superhero story-arcs as well as bonus origin stories for the characters within.

== Overview ==
The debut issue, Batman: Hush Part 1, was released on 19 August 2015 at the special price of £2.99. The price gradually rose to £9.99 per issue, then £10.99 from issue #37 and £11.99 from issue #107. The initial series of 60 issues was extended to 100 issues, and then to 180.

Eaglemoss no longer offers new subscriptions to this collection.

Similar collections had been released in countries like France, Germany, Brazil, Poland, Czech Republic, Hungary and Spain but with a different order and contents. A small local test run was also run in select parts of the UK, similar to what happens with most partworks. The German language version of the Collection ended with a total of 150 issues: most are the same as the UK series, but were released in a different order. In December 2020 an email was sent to subscribers to confirm the collection has been extended to 180 issues.

Eaglemoss launched a companion partwork DC Comics The Legend Of Batman in December 2017.

Hachette Partworks launched their own series of hardcover graphic novels, DC Heroes and Villains Collection in January 2021.

Eaglemoss announced they were bankrupt on 11 July 2022, the Webshop is no longer accessible and to date there have been no new subscription deliveries since Issue 170 - 172 in December 2021.

The Subscription Account Website is now no longer operating as of w/c 12 September 2022.

== List of books ==
Below is a working list of the books which will be released as part of the collection. They may change and are different to the line-ups of other countries who share the collection. The information is sourced from an email to their customer services department.

#	Title	Pt	Collecting	Release Date
1	Batman: Hush	1	Batman #608-613 and Detective Comics #27	19 August 2015
2	Batman: Hush	2	Batman #614-618 and Detective Comics #33	3 September 2015
3	Superman: Last Son of Krypton		Action Comics #844-846 & #851, Action Comics Annual #11, Superman Annual #13 and Superman #1	17 September 2015
4	JLA: Tower of Babel		JLA #43-46, JLA Secret Files #3 and The Brave and the Bold #28	1 October 2015
5	Superman/Batman: Public Enemies		Superman/Batman #1-6 and Superman #76	15 October 2015
6	Batman and Son		Batman #655-658, #664-665 and Detective Comics #411	29 October 2015
7	JLA: Year One	1	JLA: Year One #1-6 and Justice League of America #9	12 November 2015
8	JLA: Year One	2	JLA: Year One #7-12 and Detective Comics #225	26 November 2015
9	Harley Quinn: Preludes and Knock-Knock Jokes		Harley Quinn #1-7 (2000 – 2001) and "Batgirl: Year One" from The Batman Adventures #12	10 December 2015
10	The Man of Steel		Man of Steel #1-6 and "Superman, Champion of the Oppressed" from Action Comics #1	24 December 2015
11	Batman: A Death in the Family		Batman #426-#429 and Batman #366	7 January 2016
12	Lex Luthor: Man of Steel		Lex Luthor: Man of Steel #1-5 and Action Comics #23	21 January 2016
13	JLA: Earth 2		JLA: Earth 2 and The Flash #123	4 February 2016
14	The Brave and the Bold: Lords of Luck		The Brave and the Bold #1-6 and The Brave and the Bold #50	18 February 2016
15	Green Lantern: Secret Origin		Green Lantern #29-35 and Showcase #22	3 March 2016
16	The Death of Superman		Superman: The Man of Steel #18-19, Justice League of America #69, Superman #74-75, and Action Comics #684	17 March 2016
17	Batman: The Long Halloween	1	Batman: The Long Halloween #1-6 and Batman #181	31 March 2016
18	Batman: The Long Halloween	2	Batman: The Long Halloween #7-13 and Detective Comics 66	14 April 2016
19	Flash: Born to Run		The Flash #62-65, The Flash Annual #8, Speed Force #1, The Flash 80-Page Giant #1 and The Flash 135	28 April 2016
20	Robin: Year One		Robin: Year One 1-4 and Detective Comics 38	12 May 2016
21	Superman/Batman: Supergirl		Superman/Batman 8-13 and Action Comics 252	26 May 2016
22	Trinity		Trinity 1-3 and World's Finest 71	9 June 2016
23	Wonder Woman: Paradise Lost		Wonder Woman 164-170 and New Teen Titans 38	23 June 2016
24	JLA: The Nail		Justice League of America: The Nail 1-3 and Superman 13	7 July 2016
25	Batman: The Doom That Came to Gotham		Batman: The Doom That Came to Gotham 1-3 and The Demon 1	21 July 2016
26	Wonder Woman: The Circle		Wonder Woman (Vol. 3) 14-17 and Wonder Woman 98 + 105	4 August 2016
27	Superman: Brainiac		Action Comics 866–870, Superman: New Krypton Special 1 and Action Comics 242	18 August 2016
28	Catwoman: Selina's Big Score		Catwoman: Selina's Big Score, Detective Comics 759-762 and Batman 1	1 September 2016
29	Justice	1	Justice 1-6 and More Fun Comics 73	15 September 2016
30	Justice	2	Justice 7-12 and Whiz Comics 2	29 September 2016
31	Superman: Secret Origin		Superman: Secret Origin 1-6 and Superman 125	13 October 2016
32	Batgirl: Year One		Batgirl: Year One 1-9 and Batman 139	27 October 2016
33	Batman: Birth of the Demon	1	Batman: Son of the Demon, Batman: Bride of the Demon and Batman 232	10 November 2016
34	Batman: Birth of the Demon	2	Batman: Birth of the Demon and Batman 235	24 November 2016
35	Young Justice: A League of Their Own		Young Justice Secret Files 1 & Young Justice 2-7 (incorrectly credited as Young Justice 1–6) and The Flash 92	8 December 2016
36	Catwoman: Trail of the Catwoman		Catwoman 1–4, 6-9 and Batman 62	22 December 2016
37	Green Arrow: Quiver	1	Green Arrow 1-5 and The Brave and the Bold 85	5 January 2017
38	Green Arrow: Quiver	2	Green Arrow 6-10 and Flash Comics 86 + 92	19 January 2017
39	The Flash: Rogue War		The Flash 220-225 and Showcase 8	2 February 2017
40	Superman: Birthright	1	Superman: Birthright 1-6 and Action Comics 245	16 February 2017
41	Superman: Birthright	2	Superman: Birthright 7-12 and Adventure Comics 271	2 March 2017
42	Batman: Strange Apparitions		Detective Comics 468, 471–476, 478–479, 481 and Detective Comics 36	16 March 2017
43	Wonder Woman: Eyes of the Gorgon		Wonder Woman 206-213 and Wonder Woman 92	30 March 2017
44	Plastic Man: On the Lam		Plastic Man 1-6 and Police Comics 1	13 April 2017
45	Green Arrow: Year One		Green Arrow: Year One 1-6 and More Fun Comics 73	27 April 2017
46	The New Frontier	1	DC: The New Frontier 1-3 and Adventure Comics 466	11 May 2017
47	The New Frontier	2	DC: The New Frontier 4-6 and Showcase 17	25 May 2017
48	Flash: The Return of Barry Allen		The Flash 74-79 and Superman 199	8 June 2017
49	Justice League: Another Nail		JLA: Another Nail 1-3 and Showcase 34	22 June 2017
50	Wonder Woman: Gods and Mortals		Wonder Woman (Vol. 2) 1-7 and Wonder Woman (Vol. 1) 1	6 July 2017
51	The Man Who Laughs/Arkham Asylum		Batman: The Man Who Laughs, Batman: Arkham Asylum - A Serious House on Serious Earth and Batman 327	20 July 2017
52	JLA: New World Order		JLA 1–4, JLA Secret Files and Origins 1 and Justice League of America 42	3 August 2017
53	New Teen Titans: The Judas Contract		The New Teen Titans 39–40, Tales of the Teen Titans 41–44, Tales of the Teen Titans Annual 3 and The Brave and the Bold 54	17 August 2017
54	Superman: For Tomorrow	1	Superman 204-209 and Action Comics 241	31 August 2017
55	Superman: For Tomorrow	2	Superman 210-215 and Action Comics 283	14 September 2017
56	Justice League: Cry for Justice		Justice League: Cry for Justice 1-7 and Action Comics 248	28 September 2017
57	Batman: Under the Hood		Batman 635-641 and Detective Comics 168	12 October 2017
58	Green Lantern/Green Arrow: Hard-Traveling Heroes		Green Lantern/Green Arrow 76-81 and All American Comics 16	26 October 2017
59	Flashpoint		Flashpoint 1-5, The Flash 139	9 November 2017
60	Superman/Batman: Torment		Superman/Batman #37-42 and Forever People #1	23 November 2017
61	Batman/Huntress: Cry For Blood		Batman/Huntress 1-6, DC Super Stars #17	7 December 2017
62	JLA: Act of God		JLA: Act of God (2000) #1-3, The Brave and the Bold (1955) #30	21 December 2017
63	Superman: Whatever Happened to the Man of Tomorrow?		Superman (1939) #30 (IV) & #423, Superman Annual (1960) #11, Action Comics (1938) #583, DC Comics Presents (1978) #85	4 January 2018
64	JLA/JSA Virtue & Vice		JLA/JSA: Virtue and Vice (2002), Justice League of America (1960) #21, More Fun Comics (1936) #55	18 January 2018
65	Swamp Thing	1	The Saga of Swamp Thing (1982) #21-27, House of Secrets (1956) #92	1 February 2018
66	Superman/Batman: World's Finest		Legends of the World's Finest (1994) #1-3, World's Finest Comics (1941) #88	15 February 2018
67	Green Lantern: Revenge of the Green Lanterns		Green Lantern (2005) #7-13, DC Comics Presents (1978) #27	1 March 2018
68	Superman/Shazam: First Thunder		Superman/Shazam: First Thunder (2005) #1-4, Superman (1939) #276	15 March 2018
69	The Golden Age (comics)		The Golden Age (1993) #1-4, Justice League of America (1961) #22]	29 March 2018
70	Justice League International	1	Justice League (1987) #1-6, Justice League International (1987) #7, Captain Atom (1965) #83	12 April 2018
71	Swamp Thing	2	The Saga of Swamp Thing (1982) #28-34, Swamp Thing Annual (1982) #2, Swamp Thing (1972) #1	26 April 2018
72	Green Lantern: Wanted Hal Jordan		Green Lantern (2005) #14-20, Green Lantern (1960) #16	10 May 2018
73	Superman and the Legion of Super-Heroes		Action Comics (1938) #858-863, Adventure Comics (1938) #247	24 May 2018
74	Teen Titans: The Future is Now		Teen Titans/Legion Special (2004) #1, Teen Titans (2003) #16-23, The Brave and the Bold (1955) #60	7 June 2018
75	Batman: Dark Knight Dynasty		Batman: Dark Knight Dynasty (1997), The Flash (1959) #137	21 June 2018
76	The Flash: Lightning in a Bottle		The Flash: The Fastes Man Alive (2006) #1-6, Impulse (1995) #1	5 July 2018
77	Justice League International	2	Justice League International (1987) 8-12, Mister Miracle (1971) 1	19 July 2018
78	Superman: Krisis of The Krimson Kryptonite		Superman (1987) 49-50, Adventures of Superman (1987) 472-423, Action Comics (1938) 659-660, Starman (1988) 28, Superman (1939) 61	2 August 2018
79	Hawkman Endless Flight		Hawkman (2002) 1-6, Hawkman Secret Files and Origins (2002) 1, Flash Comics (1940) 1	16 August 2018
80	Superman & Batman: Generations		Superman & Batman Generations (1999) 1-4, World's Finest (1941)	30 August 2018
81	The New Gods	1	New Gods (1971) 1-6, Tales of the Unexpected (1956) 16	13 September 2018
82	The New Gods	2	New Gods (1971) 7-11, Detective Comics (1937) 64	27 September 2018
83	New Teen Titans: Birth of the Titans		DC Comics Presents (1978) 26 (II), New Teen Titans (1980) 1-6, Doom Patrol (1964) 99	11 October 2018
84	Superman: Panic in the Sky		Action Comics (1938) 544, 674-675, Superman: The Man of Steel (1991) 9-10, Superman (1987) 65-66, Adventures of Superman (1987) 488-489	25 October 2018
85	The Great Darkness Saga		Legion of Super-Heroes (1980) 290-294, Adventure Comics (1938) 300	8 November 2018
86	JSA: Justice Be Done		JSA (1999) 1-4, More Fun Comics (1940) 55	22 November 2018
87	Kingdom Come	1	Kingdom Come (1996) 1-2, More Fun Comics (1936) 52	6 December 2018
88	Kingdom Come	2	Kingdom Come (1996) 3-4, All-Star Comics (1940) 3	20 December 2018
89	Batman Odyssey	1	Batman: Odyssey (2010) 1-6, Detective Comics (1937) 32	3 January 2019
90	Batman Odyssey	2	Batman: Odyssey (2011) 1-7 & Batman (1940) 35	17 January 2019
91	Legends		Legends (1986) 1-6 & Firestorm (1978) 1	31 January 2019
92	Flash: Terminal Velocity		The Flash (1987) 95-100, The Flash (1959) 125	14 Feb 2019
93	Teen Titans: The Return of Donna Troy		DC Special: The Return of Donna Troy (2005), Teen Titans (1966) 1	28 Feb 2019
94	Batman & The Outsiders		Batman and the Outsiders (1983) 1-4, The Brave and the Bold (1955) 200	14 Mar 2019
95	Justice League: Rise & Fall.		Justice League: Rise and Fall Special (2010) 1, Green Arrow and Black Canary (2007) 31-32, Justice League: The Rise of Arsenal (2010) 1-4, More Fun comics (1936) 89	28 Mar 2019
96	Time Masters: Vanishing Point		Time Masters: Vanishing Point (2010) 1-6 & Time Masters (1990) 1	11 April 2019
97	Teen Titans: A Kid's Game		Teen Titans (2003) 1-7 & The Flash (1959) 110	25 April 2019
98	Wonder Woman: Amazons Attack	1	Wonder Woman (2006) 6-10, Amazons Attack! (2007) 1-2 Wonder Woman (1942) 183	9 May 2019
99	Wonder Woman: Amazons Attack	2	Wonder Woman (2006) 11-13, Amazons Attack! (2007) 3-6 & Wonder Woman (1942) 185	23 May 2019
100	JLA Scary Monsters		JLA: Scary Monsters (2003) 1-6 & All-Star Squadron (1981) 25]	6 June 2019
101	Batman: Outlaws		Batman: Outlaws (2000) 1-3 & Batman (1940) 360	20 June 2019
102	JLA Gatekeeper		JLA: Gatekeeper (2001) 1-3 & Green Lantern Annual (2000) 9	4 July 2019
103	Green Lantern Corps: To Be a Lantern		Green Lantern Corps (2006) 1-6 & Green Lantern Corps (1986) 201	18 July 2019
104	Batman: Tenses		Batman: Tenses (2003) #1-2 & Green Lantern: Mosaic (1992) #1	18 August 2019
105	Supergirl: True Strength		Supergirl (2005) #0-5 & Action Comics (1938) #286	1 September 2019
106	The Flash: Full Throttle		The Flash: The Fastest Man Alive (2007) #7-13 & The Flash (1956) #128	15 September 2019
107	Catwoman: When In Rome		Catwoman: When in Rome (2004) #1-6 & Batman: Legends of the Dark Knight Halloween Special (1993) #1	29 September 2019
108	The Brave and the Bold: The Book of Destiny		The Brave and the Bold (2007) #7-12 & My Greatest Adventure (1955) #80	6 October 2019
109	Batman: Second Chances	1	Batman (1940) #402-403, #408-411 & Batman (1940) #368	20 October 2019
110	Batman: Second Chances	2	Batman (1940) #412-416, Batman Annual #11 & Star-Spangled Comics #65	3 November 2019
111	Booster Gold: Blue and Gold		Booster Gold (2007) #0, #7-10, #1,000,000 & Booster Gold (1986) #1	17 November 2019
112	Superman/Supergirl: Maelstrom		Superman/Supergirl: Maelstrom #1-5 & Mister Miracle (1971) #6	1 December 2019
113	The Flash: Fast Money		The Flash #238-243 & The Flash #106	8 December 2019
114	The World's Greatest Super-Heroes	1	Superman: Peace on Earth, Batman: War on Crime and Shazam: Power of Hope & Shazam #1	22 December 2019
115	The World's Greatest Super-Heroes	2	Wonder Woman: Spirit of Truth, JLA: Secret Origins and JLA: Liberty and Justice & Christmas with the Super-Heroes #2	2 January 2020
116	Green Arrow/Black Canary: The Wedding Album		Green Arrow #75, Black Canary #1-4, Black Canary: Wedding Planner #1, Green Arrow & Black Canary Wedding Special #1 & Justice League of America #75	19 January 2020
117	Wonder Woman: Rise of the Olympian		Wonder Woman #26-33 & Wonder Woman #106	2 February 2020
118	Justice League: Formerly Known as the Justice League		Formerly Known as the Justice League #1-6 & DC Comics Presents #46	16 February 2020
119	Batman: Jekyll and Hyde		Batman: Jekyll and Hyde 1-6 & Batman #81	8 March 2020
120	Superman: Superman Versus Lobo		Adventures of Superman #464, Superman: Man of Steel #30, Superman Adventures Special #1, DC First: Superman/Lobo #1 & Justice League International #19	22 March 2020
121	JLA: Two Thousand		DC Two Thousand #1-2 & The Flash #143	5 April 2020
122	Final Crisis: Legion of 3 Worlds		Final Crisis: Legion of 3 Worlds #1-5 & Legion of Super-Heroes #0	19 April 2020
123	Supergirl: Way of the World		Supergirl #28-33 & Resurrection Man #1	3 May 2020
124	JLA: Omega		Justice League of America #49-53 & Justice League of America #87	17 May 2020
125	Batwoman: Elegy		Detective Comics #854-860 & Detective Comics #485	31 May 2020
126	Superman/Batman: Vengeance		Superman/Batman #20-25 & Superman's Pal, Jimmy Olsen #134	14 June 2020
127	Wonder Woman: Ends of the Earth		Wonder Woman #20-25 & Sensation Comics #2	28 June 2020
128	Superboy: The Boy of Steel		Adventure Comics #1-3 and #5-6 & Superboy and the Legion of Superheroes #222	2 July 2020
129	Supergirl: Death and the Family		Supergirl Annual #1 and Supergirl #48-50 & Action Comics #595	July 2020
130	Wonder Woman: Who is Wonder Woman?		Wonder Woman #1-5, Wonder Woman Annual #1 and The Power of Shazam #15	
131	Superman/Batman: Enemies Among Us		Superman/Batman #28-33 and Superman #127	
132	Batman: Lovers and Madmen		Batman Confidential #7-12 and Batman #251	
133	Green Arrow: Hunter's Moon		Green Arrow #1-6 and Action Comics #428	
134	Nightwing: The Giant Leap		Nightwing #147-153 and Superman #158	
135	Wonder Woman: Odyssey	1	Wonder Woman #600-606 and All-Star Comics #8	
136	Wonder Woman: Odyssey	2	Wonder Woman #607-614 and Sensation Comics #6	
137	Superman: Kryptonite Nevermore		Superman #233-238 and #240-242 and Action Comics #261	
138	Batman and The Outsiders: Chrysalis		Batman and The Outsiders #1-5 and Detective Comics #402	
139	JSA: Black Reign		JSA #56-58, Hawkman #23-25 and The Marvel Family #1	
140	Superman: Dark Knight Over Metropolis		Action Comics Annual #1, Adventures of Superman #466-467, Action Comics #653-654, Superman #44 and Adventure Comics #293	
141	Zero Hour: Crisis in Time		Zero Hour: Crisis in Time #4-0 and Showcase #75	
142	JLA: World War III		JLA #34-41 and Justice League of America #111	
143	The Flash: Wonderland		The Flash #164-169 and The Flash #105	
144	Batman: Year Two		Detective Comics #575-578, Batman: Full Circle and Batman #237	
145	Aquaman: Time and Tide		Aquaman: Time and Tide #1-4 and Adventure Comics #260	
146	Superman for All Seasons			
147	Wonder Woman: Destiny Calling		Wonder Woman (1986) #20-24	
148	Suicide Squad: Trial by Fire		Secret Origins #14 (1987) and Suicide Squad #1-7 (1987)	
149	Cosmic Odyssey		Cosmic Odyssey #1-4 (1988)	
150	Green Arrow: The Archer's Quest		Green Arrow (Volume 3) #16-21 (2002)	
151	Batman: Super Powers		Batman Confidential #50-54 (2011)	
152	Superman: Secret Identity		Superman: Secret Identity #1-4 (2004) and Action Comics #313 (1964)	
153	Harley Quinn: Night and Day		Harley Quinn #8-13 (2001), Harley Quinn:Our Worlds At War #1 (2001) and The Batman Adventure Annual #1 (1994)	
154	JLA: The Tornado's Path		Justice League of America #1-6 (2006 / 2007) and Justice League of America #64 (1968)	
155	The Atom: Sword of The Atom		Sword of The Atom #1-4 (1983), Sword of The Atom Special #1-3 (1984, 1985 & 1988) & Showcase #34 (1961)	
156	Superman: Kryptonite		Superman Confidential #1-5 (2007), #11 (2008) & Superman #162 (1963)	
157	The New Teen Titans: Volume 2		The New Teen Titans #9-16 (1981 / 1982) & Star Spangled Comics #82 (1948)	
158	Batman: Knight and Squire		Knight and Squire #1-6 (2010 / 2011) & Batman #62 (1950)	
159	Green Lantern: Emerald Twilight / New Dawn		Green Lantern #48-55 (1994) & Green Lantern #87 (1971)	
160	Wonder Woman: Paradise Found		Wonder Woman #171-177 (2001 / 2002) & Wonder Woman #6 (1943)	
161	Superman: Escape from Bizarro World		Action Comics #855-857 (2007), Superman #140 (1960), DC Comics Presents #71 (1984), The Man of Steel #5 (1986) & Superboy #68 (1958)	
162	The Flash: Emergency Stop		The Flash #130-135 (1997 / 1998) & The Flash #1 (1987)	
163	Batman: Broken City		Batman #620-625 (2003 / 2004) & Detective Comics #524 (1983)	
164	Death of The New Gods	1	Death of The New Gods #1-4 (2007 / 2008) & Mister Miracle #4 (1971)	
165	Death of The New Gods	2	Death of The New Gods #5-8 (2008) & 1st Issue Special #13 (1976)	
166	Superman: The Many Worlds of Krypton		Superman #233, #236, #238, #240 (1971), #266 (1973), Superman Family #182 (1977), World of Krypton #1-3 (1979), The World of Krypton #1-4 (1987 - 1988) & Superman #132 (1959)	
167	JLA: The Lightning Saga		JLA #8-11 (2007), JSA #5-6 (2007), JLA #0 (2006) & Adventure Comics #267 (1959)	
168	The Flash: The Human Race		The Flash #136-141 (1998), Secret Origins #50 (1990) & The Flash #175 (1967)	
169	Batman and The Monster Men		Batman and The Monster Men #1-6 (2006) & Batman #1 (1940)	
170	Superman: Grounded	1	Superman #700-706 (2010/2011) & Superman #161 (1963)	
171	Superman: Grounded	2	Superman #707-711, 713-714 (2011) & Action Comics #340 (1966)	
172	Wonder Woman: Bitter Rivals		Wonder Woman #201-205 (2004) & The Brave and the Bold #78 (1968)	
173	Batman: Dark Knight, Dark City			
174	JLA: A League of One			

=== Special issues ===
The following 'special' books are due to be released as part of the collection with a UK retail price of £21.99. Special issues are available to subscribers at a discounted price of £20.99.

Issue/Volume Number	Title	Pt	Collecting	Release date
Special 1	Crisis on Infinite Earths			
Special 2	Infinite Crisis		Infinite Crisis #1-7, Infinite Crisis Secret Files and Origins 2006, Superman #226, Action Comics #836, and Adventures of Superman #649	17 March 2016
Special 3	DC Universe Legacies		Legacies #1-10	9 June 2016
Special 4	Final Crisis		Final Crisis #1-7, Final Crisis: Superman Beyond #1-2, Final Crisis: Submit #1, Final Crisis: Secret Files and Origins (one-shot), Final Crisis: Requiem (one-shot)	29 September 2016
Special 5	Identity Crisis		Identity Crisis #1-7, The Flash #214-217	24 November 2016
Special 6	One Million	1	One Million #1-3, Man of Steel: One Million, Superman: One Million, Batman: Shadow of the bat: One Million, Nightwing: One Million, Detective Comics: One Million, Starman: One Million, JLA: One Million, Batman: One Million, Catwoman: One Million.	16 March 2017
Special 7	One Million	2	One Million #4, Robin: One Million, Wonder Woman: One Million, Shazam: One Million, Flash: One Million, Aquaman: One Million, Action Comics: One Million, Adventures of Superman: One Million, Man of Tomorrow: One Million, Resurrection Man: One Million	11 May 2017
Special 8	Brightest Day	1	Brightest Day #0-12	6 July 2017
Special 9	Brightest Day	2	Brightest Day #13-24	28 September 2017
Special 10	Invasion!		Invasion (1989) 1–3, Wonder Woman (1987) 25, Superman (1987) 26, Doom Patrol (1988) 17, Power of the Atom (1989) 7, Justice League International (1987) 22, Detective Comics (1937) 595	18 December 2017
Special 11	Batman: Gotham after Midnight		Batman: Gotham After Midnight #1-12	15 March 2018
Special 12	Superman: Earth One		Superman: Earth One Vol. 1-3	1 July 2018
Special 13	Earth One: Wonder Woman, Green Lantern, Teen Titans		Wonder Woman: Earth One Vol. 1, Green Lantern: Earth One Vol. 1, Teen Titans: Earth One Vol. 1	9 September 2018
Special 14	Solo	1	Solo Vol. 1 1-6	22 November 2018
Special 15	Solo	2	Solo Vol. 1 7-12	14 March 2019
Special 16	Superman: Reign of Doomsday		Steel 1, Outsiders 37, Justice League of America 55, Superman/Batman Annual 5, Superboy 6, Action Comics 900-904	12 May 2019
Special 17	Checkmate	1	Checkmate (Vol. 2) #1-16	1 September 2019
Special 18	Checkmate	2	Checkmate (Vol. 2) #17-31	27 October 2019
Special 19	Convergence		Convergence #0-8	16 December 2019
Special 20	Superman: Our Worlds at War	1	Superman Vol. 2 #171-172, Adventures of Superman Vol. 1 #593-594, Superman: The Man of Steel Vol. 1 #115-116, Action Comics Vol 1. #780-781, Supergirl Vol. 4 #59, JLA: Our Worlds At War Vol. 1 #1	9 April 2020
Special 21	Superman: Our Worlds at War	2	Wonder Woman Vol. 2 #172-173, Superman Vol.2 #173, Young Justice Vol.1 #36, Adventures of Superman Vol.1 #595, Impulse Vol.1 #77, Superboy Vol.4 #91, Superman: The Man of Steel Vol.1 #117, Action Comics Vol.1 #782, World's Finest: Our Worlds At War Vol.1 #1	6 July 2020
Special 22	Gotham City Sirens	1	Gotham City Sirens #1-13	5 October 2020
Special 23	Gotham City Sirens	2	Gotham City Sirens #14-26	29 December 2020
Special 24	Superman: All-Star Superman			23 March 2021
Special 25	Wonder Woman: War of the Gods			31 May 2021
Special 26	Batman: City of Crime		Batman Detective #801-814	26 July 2021
Special 27	Superman: Doomsday		Superman/Doomsday: Hunter/Prey #1-3, Doomsday Annual #1, Superman: The Doomsday Wars Vol 1-3	17 September 2021
Special 28	Batman: Transference		Batman: Gotham Knights #3-12	
Special 29	Superman: Reign of the Supermen			Not Published

=== Deluxe special editions (only available online) ===
The following 'deluxe special edition' books are only available online directly from Eaglemoss. Each book has a UK retail price of £35.99.

Issue/Volume Number	Title	Collecting	Release date
Deluxe special edition 1	Thy Kingdom Come	Justice Society of America Vol 3 #7-22 (September 2007-February 2009), Justice Society of America Annual #1 (August 2008), JSA Kingdom Come Special Superman #1 (January 2009), JSA Kingdom Come Special Magog #1 (January 2009), JSA Kingdom Come Special The Kingdom #1 (January 2009)	27 November 2018
Deluxe special edition 2	Gotham Central Volume 1	Gotham Central #01–20 (February 2003 – August 2004)	28 February 2019
Deluxe special edition 3	Gotham Central Volume 2	Gotham Central #21–40 (September 2004 – April 2006), packed with a slipcase to house both Gotham Central volumes	22 April 2020

=== Subscriber exclusive issues ===
Issue/Volume Number	Title	Collecting	Release date
Upsell 1	The Sinestro Corps War	Green Lantern #21-25, Green Lantern Corps #14-19, Green Lantern: Sinestro Corps Special #1, Tales of the Sinestro Corps: Paralax #1, Cyborg Superman #1, Superman Prime #1 and Ion #1	9 June 2016
Upsell 2	Prelude to Blackest Night	Green Lantern #26-28 & 36–42, Final Crisis: Rage of the Red Lanterns #1, Green Lantern Corps #29-39	16 March 2017
Upsell 3	Blackest Night	Green Lantern #43-52(the cover incorrectly states that it is 50–52), Blackest Night #0-8	23 November 2017
Upsell 4	Green Lantern: Brightest Day	Green Lantern (2005) 53-62, Green Lantern Corps (2006) 47-57	30 August 2018
Upsell 5	War of the Green Lanterns	Green Lantern (2005) 63-67, Green Lantern Corps (2006) 58-63, Green Lantern: Emerald Warriors (2010) 8-13, War of the Green Lanterns: Aftermath (2011) 1-2	6 June 2019
Upsell 6	52: Volume 1	52 #1-26 (2006)	23 March 2020
Upsell 7	52: Volume 2	52 #27-52 (2006)	March 2021
Upsell 8	Batman: Arkham Unhinged Volume 1	Batman: Arkham Unhinged #1-10 (2012 / 2013)	August 2021
