= Tales from the Dark Multiverse =

Comics series

Publication information
- Publisher: DC Comics
- Genre: Superhero
- Publication date: October 16, 2019 – December 29, 2020
- Main character(s): Dark Multiverse, Tempus Fuginaut

Creative team
- Written by: Various
- Artist: Various

Tales from the Dark Multiverse is an American superhero/anthology comic book limited series published by DC Comics, beginning on October 16, 2019. The series takes some of the most famous events in the DC Universe and puts a twist on them.

== Plot ==
Following the Source Wall being shattered at the end of Dark Nights: Metal, the mysterious watcher known as Tempus Fuginaut (introduced in Sideways) begins trying to recruit several "heroes" from across the Dark Multiverse in the wake of a coming crisis.

=== "Batman: Knightfall" ===
Azrael/Jean-Paul Valley refuses to give back the mantle of Batman to Bruce Wayne and defeats him and the Bat-Family, ruling Gotham City as Saint Batman for 30 years. Bruce, referred to as the Broken, is kept alive, dissected, and tortured as he is forced to watch what Jean-Paul has done to Gotham. With Saint Batman's body failing due to his Venom addiction, Bruce is rescued by the Son of Bane and Lady Shiva and turned into a cyborg. The latter two defeat Saint Batman but Bruce/the Broken, his perception of Gotham warped, kills the two and takes over as Gotham City's new ruler.

=== "The Death of Superman" ===
Lois Lane becomes enraged and bitter after the death of her fiancé Superman by Doomsday's hands, believing the world failed him. After meeting the Eradicator, who failed to bring Superman back to life, Lois proposes that the two merge, turning Lois into the Eradicator. Taking extreme measures to 'make the world a better place', along with killing Lex Luthor, the Joker and Batman (as he was about to kill her for being a threat) among others, Lois goes against Cyborg Superman after he kills Superboy and Steel. When the real but now-weaker Superman returns and sees people's fear for Lois, Cyborg Superman prepare to kill the now-reunited couple with a kryptonite cannon. Lois kills the cyborg to protect Superman but the resulting impact unleashes kryptonite gas into the atmosphere which kills Superman. Mourning and guilt-ridden for Superman's death, Lois continues her role as Earth's "savior".

=== "Blackest Night" ===
Sinestro never had the powers of the White Lantern taken away, leading to Nekron and the Black Lanterns consuming most of the universe. Sinestro, now a Black/White Lantern hybrid called the Limbo Lantern, teams up with Dove, Lobo, and Mister Miracle, the last mortal beings in the universe, in order to recreate the universe with Dove as a template for the new universe. However, when Miracle realizes that their efforts will just create a new universe and Barda will still be destroyed, he betrays them and Dove is killed, leaving Sinestro to use Lobo as the template instead after Lobo kills Miracle in revenge. However, the result is no better, leaving Sinestro to try and find a way to recreate the universe again, as the one he is in has been taken over by new lifeforms who worship Lobo. Eventually, Sinestro attempts to escape that universe to reside in the current universe. Tempus Fuginaut, not wanting that universe to pollute the main universe, uses his powers to leave Sinestro presumably trapped in that universe forever.

=== "Infinite Crisis" ===
Ted Kord was not killed by Maxwell Lord and managed to kill the latter instead. Taking control of Brother Eye and Checkmate, Kord tries to bring peace to the universe, with methods deemed questionable by his long-time friend Booster Gold and Batman. Alexander Luthor of Earth-3 tries to get Kord to ally with him and destroy multiple Earths to create a single perfect one, but Kord refuses, resulting in Luthor killing the Earth-2 Superman and Lois Lane when they discover the truth, but then being killed himself by Superboy-Prime. Kord teams up with Superboy-Prime and realizes that the only way to bring true peace is to convert everyone into OMACs. Donning a Blue Beetle/Anti-Monitor hybrid armor and turning himself into an OMAC-inspired cybernetically enhanced entity with Brother Eye installed into the system, Kord, now dubbing himself as OBAC (One-Beetle-Army-Corps), achieves his plans, at the cost of the lives of several Teen Titan members and Booster Gold.

=== "Teen Titans: The Judas Contract" ===
On the night Dick Grayson gives up being Robin, he has a private discussion with Terra and empathizes with her. He tells her that having a mentor can sometimes limit one's ability to forge their own path. Terra reports to Deathstroke shortly afterwards, who reprimands her for opening up to Dick. Inspired by Dick to become more independent, she murders Deathstroke in retaliation and forces Wintergreen to inject her with the same serum that gave Deathstroke his powers. Now calling herself Gaia and viewing herself as a goddess, Terra uses her heightened abilities to murder the Teen Titans, reduce their headquarters to rubble and destroy most of the world by destabilizing Earth's core. Robin and Kid Flash keep Gaia at bay long enough for Superman to arrive, but even the Man of Steel is no match for her, thanks to Gaia's control over kryptonite. After killing Changeling, the last person to care about her, Gaia rules over the broken Earth and forces the survivors to live in constant fear.

=== "Batman: Hush" ===
After the death of Bruce Wayne's parents, the Elliots, rather than Alfred Pennyworth raise him. Thomas Elliot grows up to become a senator and the CEO of Wayne Enterprises thanks to connections from his girlfriend, Talia al Ghul of the League of Assassins and Gotham turns into a repressive city-state. Barbara Gordon forms a rebellion group called the Outsiders, following the murder of her father. Bruce Wayne has gotten committed to Asylum Asylum, but still creates a Batman identity.

=== "War of the Gods" ===
After the War of the Gods, Wonder Woman is possessed by the magic goddess Hecate, but manages to trap her in her subconsciousness. Phobos, a servant of Hecate, orchestrates an attack on Themyscira and the deaths of Diana's loved ones, causing an emotional response that allows Hecate to take over. Under Hecate's control, she declares war on both the Gods of Olympus and humanity's new gods: superheroes. Diana is eventually defeated by Earth's magic users, but remains under Hecate's control, imprisoned under Themyscira. In response women around the globe are turned into second-class citizens and slaves while the US government begins a manhunt for the remaining superheroes.

=== "Flashpoint" ===
When Barry Allen attempts to restore his powers to undo the Flashpoint timeline, he dies in the process and Eobard Thawne takes his place and begins to reshape the world as he desires. After he blackmails the President to grant him authority by killing Aquaman to end the war, Thawne is nearly defeated by 'Superman', only for Superman to be killed by Batman so that Thawne may someday bring Bruce back to life. When Wonder Woman reappears with the New Gods of Apokolips as her gods, Thawne runs back in time to save the Waynes as a deal with Thomas, and then turns his attention to trying to reconstruct reality to make himself the hero.

=== "Crisis on Infinite Earths" ===
After the Anti-Monitor's defeat, the Justice League are trapped fighting in Ragnarök. The Justice Society and All-Star Squadron come in to rescue the team, but are outmatched by Surtur. Alan Scott sacrifices himself by becoming the pawn of Surtur known as the Dread Lantern, leading Surtur to other worlds in exchange for sparing Earth.

=== "Dark Nights: Metal" ===
When the Justice League band together with Element X, the energy corrupts them and they become the Dragons of Barbatos. Barbatos then conquers the multiverse, leaving only Duke Thomas alive. Thomas assembles a new Justice League, consisting of Detective Chimp, Barry Allen/Flash, Hawkgirl, Hawkman, Nightwing, and the Joker. They band together and defeat the Dragons of Barbatos. Thomas absorbs the deathwave energy, becoming the Last Knight, and confronts Tempus Fuginaut.

== List of titles ==
Title	Publication date	Initial writer(s)	Initial artist(s)	Based on	Ref.
Tales from the Dark Multiverse: Batman: Knightfall	October 16, 2019	Scott Snyder and Kyle Higgins	Javier Fernandez	"Batman: Knightfall"	
Tales from the Dark Multiverse: The Death of Superman	October 30, 2019	Jeff Loveness	Brad Walker and Andrew Hennessy	"The Death of Superman"	
Tales from the Dark Multiverse: Blackest Night	November 13, 2019	Tim Seeley	Kyle Hotz	"Blackest Night"	
Tales from the Dark Multiverse: Infinite Crisis	November 27, 2019	James Tynion IV	Aaron Lopresti and Matt Ryan	"Infinite Crisis"	
Tales from the Dark Multiverse: Teen Titans: The Judas Contract	December 11, 2019	Kyle Higgins and Mat Groom	Tom Raney	"The Judas Contract"	
Tales from the Dark Multiverse: Batman: Hush	November 3, 2020	Phillip Kennedy Johnson	Dexter Soy	"Batman: Hush"	
Tales from the Dark Multiverse: War of the Gods	December 1, 2020	Vita Ayala	Ariel Olivetti	"War of the Gods"	
Tales from the Dark Multiverse: Flashpoint	December 8, 2020	Bryan Hitch	Bryan Hitch	"Flashpoint"	
Tales from the Dark Multiverse: Crisis on Infinite Earths	December 15, 2020	Steve Orlando	Mike Perkins	"Crisis on Infinite Earths"	
Tales from the Dark Multiverse: Dark Nights: Metal	December 29, 2020	Jackson Lanzing, Scott Snyder, and Collin Kelly	Karl Mostert	"Dark Nights: Metal"	

== Critical reception ==
The entire crossover received generally positive reviews and received an average score of 7.5 out of 10 based on 147 reviews.

== Collected editions ==
Title	Material collected	Published date	ISBN
Tales from the DC Dark Multiverse	Tales from the Dark Multiverse: Batman: Knightfall #1, Tales from the Dark Multiverse: Death of Superman #1, Tales from the Dark Multiverse: Blackest Night #1, Tales from the Dark Multiverse: Infinite Crisis #1, Tales from the Dark Multiverse: Teen Titans: The Judas Contract #1, Batman #497, Superman #75, Blackest Night #1, Infinite Crisis #1 and Tales of the Teen Titans Annual #3	March 2020	978-1779501370
Tales from the DC Dark Multiverse II	Tales from the Dark Multiverse: Batman: Hush #1, Tales from the Dark Multiverse: Flashpoint #1, Tales from the Dark Multiverse: Wonder Woman: War of the Gods #1, Tales from the Dark Multiverse: Crisis on Infinite Earths #1, Tales from the Dark Multiverse: Dark Nights Metal #1, Batman #619, Flashpoint #1, Wonder Woman: War of the Gods #4, Crisis on Infinite Earths #12, and Dark Nights: Metal #6.	June 2021	978-1779510075
