= Scarecrow (DC Comics) =

Supervillain in the DC Universe

- Scarecrow in Infinite Frontier #0 (March 2021). Art by Jorge Jiménez and Tomeu Morey.

Publication information
- Publisher: DC Comics
- First appearance: World's Finest Comics #3 (September 1941)
- Created by: Bill Finger; Sheldon Moldoff

In-story information
- Alter ego: Jonathan Crane
- Team affiliations: Legion of Doom; Injustice Gang; Secret Society of Super Villains; Injustice League; Sinestro Corps
- Notable aliases: Scarebeast; Ichabod Crane; Master of Fear
- Abilities: Genius-level intellect; Criminal mastermind; Expert psychologist and biochemist; Utilizes fear-inducing toxins and chemicals

The Scarecrow is a supervillain appearing in American comic books published by DC Comics. Created by writer Bill Finger and artist Sheldon Moldoff, the character first appeared in World's Finest Comics #3 (1941) as an adversary of the superhero Batman. Although Scarecrow only made two appearances in the 1940s, he was revived by writer Gardner Fox in Batman #189 (1967) which debuted his Fear Toxin. The character has since become one of Batman's most enduring enemies, belonging to the collective of adversaries that make up his rogues gallery.

In the DC Universe, Scarecrow is the alias of Dr. Jonathan Crane, clinical psychologist and professor of psychology turned criminal mastermind. Abused and bullied in his youth, he becomes obsessed with fear and develops a hallucinogenic drug—dubbed "fear toxin"—to terrorize Gotham City and exploit the phobias of its protector, Batman. As the self-proclaimed "Master of Fear", Scarecrow's crimes do not stem from a common desire for wealth or power, but from a sadistic pleasure in subjecting others to his experiments on the manipulation of fear. An outfit symbolic of his namesake with a stitched burlap mask serves as Scarecrow's visual motif.

The character has been adapted in various media incarnations, having been portrayed in film by Cillian Murphy in The Dark Knight Trilogy, and in television by Charlie Tahan and David W. Thompson in Gotham, and Vincent Kartheiser in Titans. Henry Polic II, Jeffrey Combs, Dino Andrade, John Noble, Robert Englund, and others have provided the Scarecrow's voice in animation and video games.

== Publication history ==
The Scarecrow's debut in World's Finest Comics #3 (September 1941). Art by Jerry Robinson.

Batman creators Bill Finger and Sheldon Moldoff introduced the Scarecrow as a new villain in World's Finest Comics #3 (September 1941) during the Golden Age of Comic Books, in which he made only two appearances. Ichabod Crane, the protagonist of Washington Irving's The Legend of Sleepy Hollow, was used as an inspiration for the character's lanky appearance as well as his alter ego, Jonathan Crane.

Scarecrow was revived during the Silver Age of Comic Books by writer Gardner Fox in Batman #189 (February 1967), which featured the debut of the character's signature fear-inducing hallucinogen or "fear toxin" which is depicted as a bag of dust. The character remained relatively unchanged throughout the Bronze Age of Comic Books.

Following the 1986 multi-title event Crisis on Infinite Earths reboot, the character's origin story is expanded on in Batman Annual #19 and the miniseries Batman/Scarecrow: Year One, with this narrative also revealing that Crane has a fear of bats. In 2011, as a result of The New 52 reboot, Scarecrow's origin (as well as that of various other DC characters) is once again altered, incorporating several elements that differ from the original.

== Fictional character biography ==
=== Backstory ===
Born in Georgia, Jonathan Crane is abused by his great-grandmother, and is bullied at school for his resemblance to Ichabod Crane from Washington Irving's "The Legend of Sleepy Hollow", sparking his lifelong obsession with fear and using it as a weapon against others, before they can use it to defeat him like his literary namesake. In his senior year, Crane is humiliated by school bully Bo Griggs and rejected by cheerleader Sherry Squires. He takes revenge during the senior prom by donning his trademark scarecrow costume and wielding a water pistol resembling a real gun in the school parking lot. In the ensuing chaos, Griggs gets into a car accident, paralyzing himself and killing Squires.

Crane's obsession with fear leads him to become a psychologist, taking a position at Arkham Asylum and performing fear-inducing experiments on his patients. He is also a professor of psychology at Gotham University, specializing in the study of phobias. He loses his job after he fires a gun inside a packed classroom, accidentally wounding a student; he takes revenge by killing the professors responsible for his termination and becomes a career criminal.

As a college professor, Crane mentors a young Thomas Elliot. The character also has a cameo in Sandman (vol. 2) #5. In stories by Jeph Loeb and Tim Sale, the Scarecrow is depicted as one of the more deranged criminals in Batman's rogues gallery, with a habit of speaking in nursery rhymes. These stories further revise his history, explaining that he was raised by his abusive, fanatically religious great-grandfather, whom he murdered as a teenager.

=== Criminal career ===
The Scarecrow in Detective Comics #571 (February 1987). Art by Alan Davis (pencils), Paul Neary (inks), and Adrienne Roy (colors).

Scarecrow plays a prominent role in Doug Moench's "Terror" storyline, set in Batman's early years, where Professor Hugo Strange breaks him out of Arkham and gives him "therapy" to train him to defeat Batman. Strange's therapy proves effective enough to turn the Scarecrow against his "benefactor", impaling him on a weather vane and throwing him in the cellar of his own mansion. The Scarecrow then uses Strange's mansion to lure Batman to Crime Alley, and decapitates one of his former classmates in the alley in front of Batman. With the help of Catwoman—whom Scarecrow had attempted to blackmail into helping him by capturing her and photographing her unmasked—Batman catches Scarecrow, but loses sight of Strange, with it being unclear whether Strange had actually survived the fall onto the weather vane, or if Scarecrow and Batman are hallucinating from exposure to Scarecrow's fear toxin.

Scarecrow appears in Batman: The Long Halloween, first seen escaping from Arkham on Mother's Day with help from Carmine Falcone, who also helps the Mad Hatter escape. The Scarecrow gases Batman with fear toxin as he escapes, causing Batman to flee to his parents' grave as Bruce Wayne, where he is arrested by Commissioner Jim Gordon due to Wayne's suspected ties to Falcone. Scarecrow robs a bank with the Mad Hatter on Independence Day for Falcone, but is stopped by Batman and Catwoman. He later appears in Falcone's office on Halloween with Batman's future rogue's gallery, but is defeated by Batman. Scarecrow returns in Batman: Dark Victory as part of Two-Face's gang, and is first seen putting fear gas in children's dolls on Christmas Eve. He is eventually defeated by Batman. He later appears as one of the villains present at Calendar Man's trial. It is revealed he and Calendar Man had been manipulating Falcone's son Alberto; Scarecrow had determined that Alberto feared his father, and poisoned his cigarettes with the fear toxin to bring out the fear; Calendar Man, meanwhile, had been talking to Alberto, with the fear toxin making Alberto hear his father's voice. Together, they manipulate Alberto into making an unsuccessful assassination attempt on his sister, Sofia Gigante. After Two-Face's hideout is attacked, Batman captures Scarecrow, who tells him where Two-Face is heading. In Catwoman: When in Rome, Scarecrow supplies the Riddler with fear gas to manipulate Catwoman, and later aids Riddler when he fights Catwoman in Rome. Scarecrow accidentally attacks Cheetah with his scythe before Catwoman knocks him out.

The Scarecrow appears in such story arcs as Knightfall and Shadow of the Bat, first teaming with the Joker to ransom off the mayor of Gotham City. Batman foils their plan and forces them to retreat. Scarecrow betrays Joker by spraying him with fear gas, but it has no effect; Joker then beats Scarecrow senseless with a chair. Scarecrow later tries to take over Gotham with an army of hypnotized college students, commanding them to spread his fear toxin all over the city. His lieutenant is the son of the first man he killed. He is confronted by both Batman-Azrael and Anarky and tries to escape by forcing his lieutenant to jump off of a building. Batman-Azrael knocks him out, and Anarky manages to save the boy. Despite his criminal history, he is still recognized as a skilled psychologist. When Aquaman needs insight into a serial killer operating in his new city of Sub Diego—San Diego having been sunk and the inhabitants turned into water-breathers by a secret organization—he consults with Scarecrow for insight into the pattern of the killer's crimes. Scarecrow determined that killer chose his victims by the initials of their first and last names to spell out the message "I can't take it any more", allowing Aquaman to determine both the true identity and final target of the real killer.

In DC vs. Marvel, the Scarecrow temporarily allies with the Marvel Universe Scarecrow to capture Lois Lane before they are both defeated by Ben Reilly.

Cover image for the graphic novel As the Crow Flies. Art by Matt Wagner

In the 2004 story arc "As the Crow Flies", Scarecrow is hired by the Penguin under false pretenses. Dr. Linda Friitawa then secretly mutates Scarecrow into a murderous creature known as the "Scarebeast", who Penguin uses to kill off his disloyal minions. The character's later appearances all show him as an unmutated Crane again, except for an appearance during the War Games story arc. Scarecrow appears in the third issue of War Games saving Black Mask from Batman and acting as the crime lord's ally, until Black Mask uses him to disable a security measure in the Clock Tower by literally throwing Scarecrow at it. Scarecrow wakes up, transforms into Scarebeast, and wreaks havoc outside the building trying to find and kill Black Mask. The police are unable to take it down, and allow Catwoman, Robin, Tarantula, and Onyx to fight Scarebeast, as Commissioner Michael Akins had told all officers to capture or kill any vigilantes, costumed criminals or "masks" they find. Even they cannot defeat the Scarebeast, though he appears to have been defeated after the Clock Tower explodes.

The Scarecrow reappears alongside other Batman villains in Gotham Underground; first among the villains meeting at the Iceberg Lounge to be captured by the Suicide Squad. Scarecrow escapes by gassing Bronze Tiger with fear toxin. He later appears warning the Ventriloquist, Firefly, Killer Moth and Lock-Up, who are planning to attack the Penguin that Penguin is allied with the Suicide Squad. The villains wave off his warnings and mock him. He later leads the same four into a trap orchestrated by Tobias Whale. Killer Moth, Firefly and Lock-Up all survive, but are injured and unconscious to varying degrees, the Scarface puppet is "killed", and Peyton Reily, the new Ventriloquist, is unharmed, though after the attack she is taken away by Whale's men. Whale then betrays Scarecrow simply for touching his shoulder (it is revealed Whale has a pathological hatred of "masks" because his grandfather was one of the first citizens of Gotham killed by a masked criminal). The story arc ends with Whale beating Scarecrow up and leaving him bound and gagged, as a sign to all "masks" that they are not welcome in Whale's new vision of Gotham.

Scarecrow appears in Batman: Hush, working for the Riddler and Hush. He composes profiles on the various villains of Gotham so Riddler and Hush can manipulate them to their own ends. He later gases Huntress with his fear gas, making her attack Catwoman. He attacks Batman in a graveyard, only to learn his fear gas is ineffective (due to Hush's bug), but before he can reveal this he is knocked out by Jason Todd. Scarecrow also appears in Batman: Heart of Hush, kidnapping a child to distract Batman so Hush can attack Catwoman. When Batman goes to rescue the child, Scarecrow activates a Venom implant, causing the boy to attack Batman. He is defeated when Batman ties the boy's teddy bear to Scarecrow, causing the child to attack Scarecrow. After capturing Scarecrow, Batman forces him to reveal Hush's location. In the "Battle for the Cowl" storyline, Scarecrow is recruited by a new Black Mask to be a part of a group of villains who are aiming to take over Gotham in the wake of Batman's apparent death. He later assists the crime lord in manufacturing a recreational drug called "Thrill," which draws the attention of Oracle and Batgirl. He is later defeated by Batgirl and once again arrested.

=== "Blackest Night" ===
Scarecrow briefly appears in the fourth issue of the "Blackest Night" storyline. His immunity to fear (brought about by frequent exposure to his own fear toxin) renders him practically invisible to the invading Black Lanterns. The drug has taken a further toll on his sanity, exacerbated by Batman's disappearance in the "Batman R.I.P." storyline; he develops a literal addiction to fear, exposing himself deliberately to the revenant army, but knowing that only Batman could scare him again. Using a duplicate of Sinestro's power ring, he is temporarily deputized into the Sinestro Corps to combat the Black Lanterns. Overjoyed at finally being able to feel fear again, Scarecrow gleefully and without question follows Sinestro's commands. His celebration is cut short when Lex Luthor, overwhelmed by the orange light of Avarice, steals his ring.

=== "Brightest Day" ===
In "Brightest Day", Scarecrow begins kidnapping and murdering college interns working for LexCorp as a way of getting back at Lex Luthor for stealing his ring. When Robin and Supergirl attempt to stop him, Scarecrow unleashes a new fear toxin that is powerful enough to affect a Kryptonian. The toxin forces Supergirl to see visions of a Black Lantern Reactron, but she is able to snap out of the illusion and help Robin defeat Scarecrow. He is eventually freed from Arkham when Deathstroke and the Titans break into the asylum to capture one of the inmates.

=== The New 52 ===
Scarecrow on the cover of Batman: The Dark Knight (vol. 2) #12 (October 2012). Art by David Finch, Richard Friend, and Sonia Oback

In 2011, The New 52 rebooted the DC universe. Scarecrow is a central villain in the Batman family of books and first appeared in the New 52 in Batman: The Dark Knight #4 (February 2012), written by David Finch and Paul Jenkins. His origin story is also altered; in this continuity, his father Gerald Crane used him as a test subject in his fear-based experiments. During one of these experiments, Crane's father locked him inside a little dark room, but suffered a fatal heart attack before he could let Jonathan out. Jonathan was trapped in the test chamber for days until being freed by some employers of the university. As a result of this event, he was irreparably traumatized and developed an obsession with fear. He became a psychologist, specializing in phobias. Eventually, Crane began using patients as test subjects for his fear toxin. His turn to criminality is also markedly different in this version; the New 52 Scarecrow is fired from his professorship for covering an arachnophobic student with spiders, and becomes a criminal after stabbing a patient to death.

The Scarecrow kidnaps Poison Ivy, and works with Bane to create and distribute to various Arkham inmates a new form of Venom infused with the Scarecrow's fear toxin. With the help of Superman and the Flash, Batman defeats the villains. The Scarecrow surfaces again in Batman: The Dark Knight #10, penned by Gregg Hurwitz, for a six-issue arc. The Scarecrow kidnaps Commissioner James Gordon and several children, and eventually releases his fear toxin into the atmosphere. Scarecrow is also used as a pawn by the Joker in the "Death of the Family" arc; he is referred to as Batman's physician. Scarecrow appears in Swamp Thing (vol. 5) #19 (June 2013), clipping flowers for his toxins at the Metropolis Botanical Garden. Swamp Thing attempts to save Scarecrow from cutting a poisonous flower, not realizing who the villain is. Scarecrow attempts to use his fear toxin on Swamp Thing. The toxin causes Swamp Thing to lose control of his powers until Superman intervenes. He is later approached by the Outsider of the Secret Society of Super Villains to join up with the group. Scarecrow accepts the offer.

As part of "Villains Month", Detective Comics (vol. 2) #23.3 (Sept. 2013) was titled The Scarecrow #1. Scarecrow goes to see Killer Croc, Mr. Freeze, Poison Ivy, and Riddler and informs them of a war at Blackgate Penitentiary is coming and learns where each of the alliances lives. Through his conversations with each, Scarecrow learns that Bane may be the cause of the Blackgate uprising and will be their leader in the impending war. It was also stated that Talons from the Court of Owls were stored at Blackgate on ice. Later, looking over the divided city, Scarecrow claims that once the war is over and the last obstacle has fallen, Gotham City would be his. Scarecrow approaches Professor Pyg at Gotham Memorial Hospital to see if he will give his supplies and Dollotrons to Scarecrow's followers. Scarecrow goes to Penguin next, who has already planned for the impending war, by blowing up the bridges giving access to Gotham City. Scarecrow and Man-Bat attempt to steal the frozen Talons from Blackgate while Penguin is having a meeting with Bane. Killer Croc rescues Scarecrow and Man-Bat from Blackgate and brings Scarecrow to Wayne Tower, where he gives Killer Croc control of Wayne Tower, as it no longer suits him. Scarecrow begins waking the Talons in his possession, having doused them with his fear gas and using Mad Hatter's mind-control technology in their helmets to control them. At Arkham Asylum, Scarecrow senses that he has lost the Talons after Bane freed them from Mad Hatter's mind-control technology. Scarecrow then turns to his next plan, giving the other inmates a small dose of Bane's Venom to temporarily transform them. Upon Bane declaring that Gotham City is finally his, he has Scarecrow hanged between two buildings.

In Batman and Robin Eternal, flashbacks reveal that Scarecrow was the first villain faced by Dick Grayson as Robin in the New 52 universe when his and Batman's investigations into Scarecrow's crimes lead Batman to Mother, a woman who believes that tragedy and trauma serve as 'positive' influences to help people become stronger. To this end, Mother has Scarecrow develop a new style of fear toxin that makes the brain suffer the same experience as witnessing a massive trauma, but Scarecrow turns against Mother as the victims of this plan would become incapable of feeling anything. Recognizing that Mother will kill him once he has outlived his usefulness, Scarecrow attempts to turn himself over to Batman, but Batman uses this opportunity to have him deliver a fake psychological profile of him to Mother, claiming that Batman is a scarred child terrified of losing the people he cares for to make Mother think she understands him. In the present day, as Mother unleashes a new hypnotic signal to take control of the world's children, the Bat-Family abduct Scarecrow to brew up a new batch of his trauma toxin after determining that it nullifies the controlling influence of Mother's signal until they can shut down her main base.

=== DC Rebirth ===
In DC Rebirth, Scarecrow works with the Haunter to release a low dose of fear toxin around Gotham on Christmas and sets up a small stand for her to pick up the toxin. Both he and Haunter are paralyzed by the toxin's effects, allowing Batman to apprehend them. The Scarecrow later emerges using a Sinestro Corps power ring to induce fear and rage against Batman in random citizens throughout Gotham, to the point where he provokes Alfred Pennyworth into threatening to shoot Simon Baz as part of his final assault. In Doomsday Clock, Scarecrow is among the villains who meet with the Riddler to discuss the Superman Theory. Wanting to take on villains outside his rogues gallery, Shazam flies to Gotham City, where he hears about a hostage situation caused by Scarecrow. Shazam starts to fight him, but is affected by fear gas. Batman regains control of the situation by defeating Scarecrow and administering an antidote.

=== Infinite Frontier ===
During Infinite Frontier, a re-designed Crane is the main foe of the crossover Fear State.

== Characterization ==
=== Skills and equipment ===
A master strategist and manipulator, his genius labels him as one of the most cunning criminal masterminds. Crane is a walking textbook on anxiety disorders and psychoactive drugs; he is able to recite the name and description of nearly every known phobia. He is even known to have a frightening ability to tamper with anyone's mind with just words, once managing to drive two men to suicide, and uses this insight to find people's mental pressure points and exploit them. Despite his scrawny build, Crane is a skilled martial artist who uses his long arms and legs in his personal combat style known as "violent dancing", developed during his training in the Kung Fu style of the White Crane, for which Scarecrow sometimes wields a sickle or scythe.

Scarecrow also has proficiency in both biochemistry and toxicology, both important to the invention of his fear toxin, which he atomized with mixed chemicals, including powerful synthetic adrenocortical secretions and other potent hallucinogens that can be inhaled or injected into the bloodstream to amplify the victim's darkest fear into a terrifying hallucination. Its potency has upgraded to an extreme level over the years; in some stories in which it appears, fear toxin is depicted as capable of prompting almost instantaneous, terror-induced heart attacks, leaving the victim in a permanent psychosis of chronic fear. Other versions of the toxin are powerful enough that even Superman can be affected; in one story, he mixes the toxin with kryptonite to simultaneously weaken and terrify the Man of Steel. To instill his toxin, he often uses a hand-held sprayer in the shape of a human skull and special straws which can be snapped in half to release it. In one story, Scarecrow concocts a chemical containing wildfowl pheromones from his childhood that causes nearby birds to attack his opponents.

=== Powers and abilities ===
In the story arc As the Crow Flies, after being secretly mutated by Dr. Linda Friitawa, Scarecrow gains the ability to turn into a large, monstrous creature called the Scarebeast. As Scarebeast, he has greatly enhanced strength, endurance, and emits a powerful fear toxin from his body. However, he has to be under physical strain or duress to transform. During the Blackest Night miniseries, Scarecrow is temporarily deputized into the Sinestro Corps by a duplicate of Sinestro's Power ring. He proves to be very capable in manipulating the light of fear to create constructs until his ring is stolen by Lex Luthor.

=== Personality ===
Crane, with only a few exceptions in his incarnations, is cruel, sadistic, deranged, and manipulative above all else. Crane is obsessed with fear, and takes sadistic pleasure in frightening his victims, often literally to death, with his fear toxin. Crane also suffers from brain damage from prolonged exposure to his own toxin that renders him nearly incapable of being afraid of anything—except Batman. This is problematic for him, as he is addicted to fear and compulsively seeks out confrontations with Batman to feed his addiction. He is also known to have a warped sense of humor, though not to the level of Black Mask or the Joker, as he has been known to frequently make taunts and quips related to his using his fear toxin or his love of terrifying others. During Alan Grant's "The God of Fear" storyline, Scarecrow develops a god complex; he creates an enormous hologram of himself that he projects against the sky, so he will be recognized and worshipped by the citizens of Gotham as a literal god of fear.

== Other characters named Scarecrow ==
=== Madame Crow ===
Abigail O'Shay is a Gotham University student who writes her doctoral thesis on vigilantes like the Bat-Family, whom she calls the "cape and cowl crowd". She is fascinated by the kind of trauma a person would have to go through to fight criminals while in costume. She learns about such trauma first hand when Jonathan Crane, then uses her as the test subject in experiments using his fear toxin, intending to test its readiness for use on Batman. She spends more than a year in Arkham Asylum recuperating from Scarecrow's experiments. Blaming Batman for her trauma, O'Shay adopted the identity of Madame Crow with the intention of making sure no one would feel the kind of fear she did ever again as she becomes a member of the Victim Syndicate. In a reversal to Scarecrow's fear toxin, Madame Crow has a set of gauntlets that fire needles filled with "anti-fear" toxin, which removes fear in the hope of keeping people from fighting to avoid their own trauma.

== Alternative versions ==
Many alternate universe versions of Scarecrow have appeared throughout the character's publication history. A character based on Jonathan Crane and Two-Face named Jenna Clarke / Scarecrone appears in Batman: Dark Knight Dynasty. This version is a metahuman with dissociative identity disorder (DID), which resulted in her developing an alternate personality called "Scarecrone", who possesses the ability to invade a person's psyche and manifest illusions based on their fears by touching them and scars the right side of Clarke's face when she emerges. Additionally, Scarecrone serves as an underling and consort of Vandal Savage, who developed a formula to control Clarke's DID and force Scarecrone to manifest whenever he needs her. A future female incarnation of the Scarecrow named Adalyn Stern appears in Batman Beyond (vol. 5). As a child, she became traumatized after witnessing Batman beat her gang leader and was placed in institutional care. Eventually, she was assigned to one of Jonathan Crane's disciples, who sought to replicate his work and amplified her fear of Batman. Sometime later, she joined the New 52 news station as Jack Ryder's co-anchor until she is uncovered and institutionalized in Arkham Asylum. In Absolute Batman, Scarecrow is a scientist working at Ark M who is accompanied by a flock of crows.

== See also ==
- List of Batman family enemies
