= Hush (character) =

DC Comics character

- Hush as he appeared on variant covers of Batman #160 and #161 (2025). Art by Gabriele Dell'Otto.

Publication information
- Publisher: DC Comics
- First appearance: Batman #609 (January 2003)
- Created by: Jeph Loeb (writer); Jim Lee (artist)

In-story information
- Alter ego: Thomas Elliot
- Species: Human
- Abilities: Skilled surgeon; Expert strategist and manipulator; Master of disguise (via plastic surgery and prosthetics); Skilled hand-to-hand combatant and marksman

Hush (Dr. Thomas "Tommy" Elliot) is a supervillain appearing in American comic books published by DC Comics. Created by Jeph Loeb and Jim Lee, the character first appeared in Batman #609 in January 2003 as part of the twelve-issue storyline Batman: Hush. Hush's background is parallel to the superhero Batman, and he serves as a criminal foil to him, as an example of what Batman could have become if he had an abusive family and used his abilities and resources for malice. He belongs to the collective of adversaries that make up Batman's rogues' gallery.

Tommy Elliot was a childhood friend of Bruce Wayne in Gotham City, who attempted to murder his own parents and inherit their massive fortune. His plan failed when Bruce's father, Dr. Thomas Wayne, saved his mother's life, beginning his grudge against the Waynes. Tommy grows up to become a gifted neurosurgeon and, out of jealous resentment, allies with the Riddler to ruin Bruce's life upon discovering his identity as Batman. Wrapping his face in bandages to conceal his identity, Tommy becomes a manipulative criminal mastermind called "Hush" to seek revenge against his former friend.

The character has been adapted from the comics into numerous forms of media, having been portrayed in live-action television by Cole Vallis and Gordon Winarick in Gotham, and by Gabriel Mann and Warren Christie in Batwoman. Kevin Conroy voiced Hush in the Batman: Arkham video game series.

== Publication history ==
Hush resurfaced in Batman: Gotham Knights, and later in Detective Comics and Batman: Streets of Gotham. He had a considerable role in Batman Eternal, and was the feature villain of Hush 2 which started in Batman v.2 #158.

== Fictional character biography ==
=== Origin ===
Thomas "Tommy" Elliot was a childhood friend of Bruce Wayne, and was also born into a wealthy family. The two boys often played a Stratego-esque minifigure game together, and Tommy taught Bruce to think like his opponents and to use their abilities against them to win, which proved useful years later when he became Batman. Thus, as a child, Tommy exhibits a genius level intellect due to his capability to think and plan strategically. Tommy despised both his abusive father and his frail, submissive mother, who came from poverty and willingly endured every abuse dealt to her and her son to keep her lavish lifestyle. For all their failings, however, Tommy's parents made sure he was well-educated. In particular, his mother taught him about the philosophy of Aristotle, attempting to use it as a way to passively deal with his father's abuse without accepting it. Tommy would often quote Aristotle as an adult.

Driven by his desire for independence and wealth, Tommy severed the brake line of his parents' car, causing a crash that killed his father and injured his mother; his mother, however, was saved in an emergency operation by Thomas Wayne, which enraged young Elliot. While at a summer camp with Bruce, Tommy attacked a boy and ended up in a psychiatric ward; he blamed Bruce and his mother for his outburst. He is released by an intern named Jonathan Crane, who becomes the villain Scarecrow.

During the next few years, Tommy tended to his mother. When Bruce's parents were murdered, Tommy resented him for inheriting the Wayne family fortune, just as he had hoped to do with his parents' money. Shortly before Bruce returned to Gotham City, Tommy befriended a young woman named Peyton Riley (who would later become the second Ventriloquist) – a relationship of which his mother never approved. When Tommy's mother recovered from cancer, she disowned him, subsequently cutting him off from the Elliot family fortune in retaliation for his continuing relationship with Peyton. As a result, Tommy murdered her by smothering her with a pillow, while Peyton killed their lawyer and destroyed Mrs. Elliot's new will. As far as the rest of the world was concerned, his mother had died of a household accident.

Finally the sole recipient of his family's fortune, Tommy abandoned Peyton and began traveling the world, as Bruce had. Although he went on to Harvard University and became a successful surgeon, Tommy continued to harbor an irrational grudge towards his childhood friend.

At some point in his career, Edward Nygma, also known as the Riddler, was diagnosed with terminal cancer and eventually hijacked one of Ra's al Ghul's Lazarus Pits to regain his health. During this mystical treatment, which renders the participant temporarily insane, the Riddler experienced an unexpected epiphany: he realized that Bruce Wayne was Batman. Soon afterwards, the Riddler attempted to sell Tommy the secrets of his newfound revelation in exchange for a large cash sum. Tommy, by this time having discovered Nygma's criminal background, instead offered to pay him to kill Bruce. Realizing that they shared a common hatred for Wayne, Tommy and the Riddler decided to pool resources to bring him down.

To this end, Elliot created for himself the persona of "Hush", becoming an antithesis to Batman. Riddler said that the name started out as a joking reference to the need to keep Tommy's identity secret, but became a more permanent alias when Scarecrow started to sing the lullaby "Hush, Little Baby".

=== Hush character arc ===
In their attempt to destroy Batman, Hush and the Riddler manipulated several other villains into unwillingly helping them. These included the Joker, Harley Quinn, Two-Face, Poison Ivy, Scarecrow, Killer Croc and Clayface. They even manipulated some of Batman's closest allies (Superman, Huntress, and Catwoman) against the Dark Knight, utilizing such methods as Poison Ivy using her pheromones to control the Man of Steel and Catwoman and Hush's seemingly benevolent funding of Huntress's vigilante activities. Part of their plot included fooling Bruce into believing the Joker had murdered Tommy; Clayface shapeshifted into Tommy's corpse to create this illusion.

With these villains as their pawns, Hush and the Riddler set up an elaborate plot against Batman. Jason Todd, who was believed to be dead for years, entered the pact with the villains and gave them insights on how Batman thought. Using the shapeshifting abilities of Clayface, they created a decoy of the former Robin; Hush collaborated with Riddler, Todd, and Clayface to use the Dark Knight's guilt over his ward's apparent death against him at Todd's gravesite.

Around this time, Hush cured the disfigured Harold Allnut, a longtime associate of Batman. In return, Harold 'bugged' the Batcave with several devices that altered Batman's mind, but nevertheless remained loyal to the Caped Crusader; he was certain that Batman would triumph over whatever followed. Hush then killed Harold in front of Batman, and immediately engaged the Dark Knight in battle. Batman was at first disoriented by Hush's quoting of Aristotle, prompting him to briefly wonder if Hush is Maxie Zeus. He noticed that Hush used Deadshot's two-gun fighting style, and theorized that he was either the assassin himself or one of his protégés.

When Tommy finally revealed himself to a worn-out Batman, the Dark Knight was saved only by the intervention of Harvey Dent, whose Two-Face persona had been unwittingly wiped out by Tommy when he repaired Dent's disfigured face. Once again on the side of the law, Dent shot Hush twice, throwing him off a bridge. Although Batman was sure that Hush was his childhood friend Thomas Elliot, he was not able to unmask him.

In 2022, a 20th anniversary edition trade paperback of the original Hush storyline contained a newly produced epilogue. Written and drawn by the original authors Jeph Loeb and Jim Lee, it detailed how Hush escaped to an air pocket in a sunken boat at the bottom of the Gotham river after his defeat on the bridge. After performing surgery on himself to remove the two bullets from Harvey Dent's gun, Hush crawls ashore, only to run into Harley Quinn and the Joker, who puts a gun to his head.

=== Hush returns ===
Still out to destroy Batman and determined not to let the rest of the villains get in his way, Hush quickly carved out a niche for himself, beating his former accomplice the Riddler to within an inch of his life. Hush even drives the Joker out of the city, thus proving to the Joker that Hush can be a threat to him. He also temporarily killed Poison Ivy during a failed attempt to recruit her.

Hush returns. Cover to Batman: Gotham Knights #60 (December 2004). Pencils by Jae Lee.

Following a short-lived alliance with JLA nemesis Prometheus, Hush began to torment Bruce Wayne with help from Clayface. Exploiting the latter's shapeshifting abilities, Hush was briefly able to shed doubt on his true identity and had Alfred Pennyworth framed for murder, using samples taken from the new Clayface to infect Alfred with a virus that would allow Elliot to control him. Hush also attempted to analyse samples taken from Clayface with the goal of duplicating Clayface's shape-shifting abilities for himself without the usual side-effects such as loss of a default human form, eventually attempting to perfect this analysis by releasing Cassius Payne from prison, reasoning that samples from Cassius would be more useful as he is the only 'pure' Clayface and the only one who was never human. After Clayface realised that he was being manipulated, he provided Batman with a sample of himself to find a cure for Alfred's condition despite knowing that this would not leave Batman with time to cure him, and also ensured that Alfred's name would be cleared by ensuring that his final appearance after death would be a form whose fingerprints so closely resembled Alfred's that the detectives would assume that they had made a mistake.

=== Payback ===
The Joker eventually returned to Gotham City with an army of trained pigeons and retaliated (in Batman: Gotham Knights #73–74). He captured Hush and kept him sedated for three weeks, during which time he implanted a pacemaker into his body, effectively gaining control of his heart. At the Joker's mercy and unable to remove the device himself, Hush turned to the one man he felt he could trust (or rather, predict): Bruce Wayne.

Bruce consented to help Hush on the condition that he allow himself to be treated in, and confined to, Arkham Asylum. Hush agreed, and then immediately escaped after being told that the surgery had been a success. He was intercepted by Batman before he could confront the Joker and demanded that Batman allow him to kill the Joker. Batman seemed to agree and began to leave, but then revealed that he had tricked Hush – the pacemaker was still in his body, and he had been allowed to escape from Arkham. At that moment, the Joker arrived, and Hush begged Batman not to leave him.

The issue (and the Batman: Gotham Knights series) ended unresolved. Hush returned in the later Man-Bat miniseries, and is later shown remembering how painful it was to remove the pacemaker alone, and how the time between Gotham Knights and Heart of Hush was mostly spent recovering from the damage suffered, confirming that Batman did desert Hush at the conclusion of "Payback".

=== Heart of Hush ===
Hush returns in Detective Comics #846-#850, in the story "Heart of Hush", which ties together with "Batman R.I.P.". In this arc, set a few nights before the events depicted in "R.I.P.", Hush is portrayed in a slightly different thematic fashion than in his prior appearances. His past as a surgeon serves as an important thematic aspect of his modus operandi. In the first issue, Hush reveals that his return was hastened when he learned of Black Glove's upcoming attack on Batman. Hush seeks to prevent Black Glove from killing Batman, which Hush sees as his right alone. In the second part, Hush teams up with Scarecrow. He performs routine plastic surgery on his own face, which is later revealed to be nearly identical to Bruce Wayne's.

Hush then ambushes and subdues Catwoman after she scratches off a portion of his facial bandages, recoiling in horror at what she sees. He then cuts out her heart, places her on life support supplied by Mr. Freeze, and delivers her to Gotham General Hospital. Hush ponders the formulation his plan in the wake of Batman's abandonment of him.

While Catwoman is left in Doctor Mid-Nite's care, Batman learns the location of Hush's headquarters from Scarecrow. Hush attacks Batman with a paralytic gas, and shows him the room containing Catwoman's heart, which is being kept alive through artificial means. He then confesses to Batman his plan: using his newfound resemblance to Bruce, he will kill and disfigure him to steal his identity, eliminating those who know him best and regularly interact with him, after which he will retire with the Wayne fortune, reasoning that Batman's fellow superheroes will accept that Batman has earned the right to end his career.

However, Batman is able to stave off the effects of the paralytic gas, recover Catwoman's heart, and warn Alfred of Hush's deception. Although Alfred disarms Elliot, Hush manages to get the Batcave, where he nearly kills Batman, but Alfred's continued interference and the arrival of Nightwing and Robin turned the tide. Hush retreats on the Whirly-Bat, a one-man helicopter, but his bandages become tangled in the rotor, causing the vehicle to explode.

In searching for traces of Hush, Batman, Nightwing, and Robin find only some bloody bandages, and conclude that he is dead. Doctor Mid-Nite surgically restores Catwoman's heart, but notes that she is unlikely to ever regain her physical prowess. While convalescing, she and her allies find all of Hush's secret bank accounts, and loots those funds for themselves, which she documents in a video that she ultimately leaves for Hush to find, in the event that he survived. Hush, revealed to be indeed alive but wounded and crutch-bound, sees this video, before limping off into locations unknown.

Later, posing as Bruce Wayne, Hush travels to Australia and Vietnam to loot the cash accounts of Wayne Enterprises' subsidiaries. He is captured by Catwoman, along with Nightwing and Robin, who incarcerate him in a secret safe house. Hush, still wearing Bruce's appearance, decides to fake his surrender, waiting for the right moment to escape.

=== Batman reborn ===
In Streets of Gotham, Batman's biological son Damian Wayne visited Hush in his cell as the new Robin, and they played chess. When Damian left to deal with a new crisis, Hush surmised that Firefly was behind the attack. He noted how Gotham City had fallen apart in Batman's absence, and pondered how to use the current situation to his advantage. Hush faked experiencing spontaneous combustion, and when Alfred arrived at his cell to assist, Hush overpowered him and escaped. He then re-emerged as Bruce Wayne, claiming that he would donate a billion dollars a month to Gotham City until the financial crisis was over. Dick and Damian, along with the Outsiders and assorted other superheroes, explained to Hush that they would always watch and control him- with the other heroes acting as a 'board of directors' intended to 'supervise' his financial dealings- and that someone will always be ready to take him down if he steps out of line. With no other option available to him, Hush reluctantly agreed to play Dick Grayson's puppet, posing as Bruce Wayne, and thus keeping the public from realizing that Bruce was dead. Though this ruined his original plan to sap the Wayne fortune, Hush did not allow it to halt his scheming altogether. Hush had appeared, notably as a member of the Gotham Shield Committee, around Gotham quite frequently, often attempting to make connections. When Ra's al Ghul arrived in Gotham, promising to ruin the Wayne family in retaliation against Red Robin, he immediately sought out Hush. Faced with the prospect of Hush using Ra's al Ghul's support to turn on the Bat-family again, Tim Drake activated a contingency plan set in place by Wayne himself to transfer controlling interest in Wayne Enterprises to Drake "if something should happen". This left Hush with no official standing in the company.

=== "House of Hush" ===
Hush reappeared in Streets of Gotham for the story arc "House of Hush" beginning in #14. He attempted to push the boundaries of his new role as Bruce Wayne, such as recommending that convicted criminals be allowed back on the streets. However, this plan backfired when the criminal Jane Doe—a woman who lost her face in an accident and had resorted to cutting off the faces of others—became obsessed with 'Bruce Wayne' after he had her released. She infiltrated his life by taking the face of his new assistant, and subsequently cut off Elliot's new face with the intention of becoming Bruce Wayne herself. The returned Bruce Wayne, once again acting as Batman, caught her and Hush, and they were both sent to Arkham, Bruce declaring that he was Batman's financial backer to make any attempt Hush might make to expose his identity basically irrelevant.

During the events of Batman: Gates of Gotham, Hush was freed from Arkham by a new villain named the Architect. As this happened, Red Robin, Batman, and Blackbat realized that the Elliot family was connected to a series of bombings that destroyed three historical Gotham bridges. Batman found Hush, who had been betrayed by the Architect and strapped to a bomb, but was forced to sacrifice Wayne Tower to save his life.

=== The New 52: "Batman Eternal" ===
In September 2011, The New 52 rebooted DC's continuity. In this new timeline, Hush first appears in the series Batman Eternal as the apparent mastermind behind Commissioner Gordon's downfall and Carmine Falcone's return. After injecting Alfred with fear toxin, Hush is seen communicating with Jason Bard about taking control of Gotham.

In issue twenty-six, a slightly revised origin for Hush was revealed; he was still Tommy Elliot, a childhood friend of Bruce Wayne, but in this version, his parricide is explicitly described as a way for him to get closer to Bruce (who had started distancing himself from Tommy after the death of his own parents) rather than as a way for him to receive his inheritance or escape abuse and neglect.

Hush turned public opinion against Wayne Enterprises by blowing up one of Batman's hidden weapon caches (known to be connected to Wayne Enterprises after the events of Batman Incorporated) below Gotham, killing an unknown number of civilians, policemen and military personnel. He was able to enter the cache with DNA taken from Alfred Pennyworth.

After having blown up another weapon cache and having been shot through the shoulder with a grappling hook by Julia Pennyworth, Hush gave up his location to Batman to face him in a final showdown. They met and fought in a weapon cache below the Martha Wayne Foundation hospital, which Hush had rigged to explode as a backup plan. Batman defeated Hush, but was then informed that the government had seized control of Wayne Enterprises and its holdings due to its involvement in the catastrophic explosions around Gotham. Hush then taunted Batman, stating, "Maybe you're right Bruce, maybe I'm not you. But right now, who would want to be?"

Hush was then kept as prisoner in the Batcave, but broke out with the help of the then unknown mastermind behind the current threat. Hush proceeded to sabotage the equipment of several members of the Batman Family via the Batcomputer as they fought various villains, including crashing the Batwing with Batman still in it. He was then returned to captivity after having been ambushed by Alfred Pennyworth, Alfred harshly informing Hush that he was hardly going to be locked up in his own home.

=== All-Star Batman ===
In All-Star Batman #10, Hush secretly allies himself with Penguin, Black Mask, and Great White Shark to trick Batman into procuring a MacGuffin called the Genesis engine for them. The ruse succeeds, but Hush and his allies are then ambushed and nearly murdered by the new villain Nemesis.

=== DC Rebirth ===
After DC Comics' line-wide relaunch Rebirth, Hush first appeared in a single-panel cameo in issue 19 of Batman (vol. 3), wherein he is an inmate at Arkham Asylum and beaten up by Bane.

Hush is tipped off to Batman's upcoming wedding by the Joker. Hush attempts to attack Batman's bachelor party, causing an explosion to distract Superman and then attacking Batman and Nightwing. In the course of the confrontation, Hush's attack disrupts a dimensional gate Superman had provided that was intended to take Batman to a peaceful pocket universe, resulting in Hush and Nightwing being trapped in an in-between place for individuals who have lost all sense of individual identity. As Hush's rants affirm his inability to forge a life for himself outside of an obsession with Bruce Wayne, he reveals that he has given himself plastic surgery to look like Dick Grayson to try and recapture his old friendship with Bruce. Ultimately, Hush is left behind in the pocket dimension despite Nightwing's attempts to help him.

However, in Batman (vol. 3) #70, Hush is apparently back in Arkham Asylum as he is one of several villains Batman beats up during his escape after having been captured and subjected to mental torture by Scarecrow, the Flashpoint timeline's Batman, and Bane. Later, Hush is shown to be a member of Bane's police force after he had taken control over the institutions of Gotham. Hush duels with Batman, but loses.

Hush resurfaces in Detective Comics #1031, where he takes advantage of the confusion during an anti-vigilante riot to drug and kidnap several members of the Bat Family: Batwoman, Nightwing, Red Hood, Signal, and two Batgirls (Barbara Gordon and Cassandra Cain). Hush plans to harvest their organs to sell on the black market, but is stopped by Batman and Damian Wayne. It also comes to light that Hush tried to have Bruce Wayne murdered as a boy, using his father's half-sister Catherine (who worked as a GCPD detective) to cover up the attempts by botching the investigations.

== Other versions ==
=== Batman Beyond ===
Two incarnations of Hush, Tommy Elliot and a clone of Dick Grayson, appear in Batman Beyond (vol. 3). Years prior, Elliot attempted to escape Bruce Wayne, only to be shot by a homeowner whose house he had broken into. Due to injuries he sustained prior to the chase and his poor reputation with the Gotham City Police Department (GCPD) at the time, Bruce was unable to examine Elliot's body. While he felt satisfied when the GCPD seemed to have confirmed Elliot had died for him, he feared that Elliot could have fabricated the scenario.

In the present, the clone emerges as a masked vigilante out to kill Bruce's rogues' gallery under the belief that doing so will orphan Bruce again. Despite resistance from Terry McGinnis, Grayson's memories allow the clone to outmaneuver him. In time, Bruce and Terry would learn the clone's identity and that he had been created by Amanda Waller via the original Grayson's DNA and memory readings taken from his last outing as Nightwing in the hopes of having someone she could control more easily. Additionally, Waller's associate and the clone's co-creator Doctor Nora Reid reveals she is Elliot's granddaughter who seeks to atone for his sins. When the clone attempts to cause an earthquake to destroy Gotham, Terry and Grayson join forces with the clone's former associate Catwoman to stop him. In the ensuing fight, Terry accidentally kills the clone before the latter's body disappears into a pit. Afterward, Waller forces Reid to claim responsibility for the clone's actions so the former can continue her work.

=== Flashpoint ===
An alternate timeline version of Hush makes a cameo appearance in Flashpoint as one of several criminals who were killed by Batman.

=== Superman/Batman ===
An alternate timeline version of Tommy Elliot appears in Superman/Batman #17. After using the Legion of Super-Villains' time-travel technology to avert his parents' deaths, Batman creates a timeline where he and Elliot remained friends as adults.

=== Tales From The Dark Multiverse ===
An alternate universe version of Tommy Elliot and a version of Bruce Wayne / Batman partially based on Hush called Batman the Silenced appear in Tales from the Dark Multiverse: Batman - Hush. After the driver Elliot hired to kill his parents killed Thomas and Martha Wayne by mistake, Elliot's family adopted the orphaned Bruce Wayne, who seemingly succumbed to psychosis and was remanded to Arkham Asylum. After inheriting Wayne Industries, Elliot goes on to become a senator in the independent yet oppressive city-state of Gotham. However, he is deposed by Bruce, who had faked his psychosis and used his time in Arkham to train himself into a vigilante.

== In other media ==
=== Television ===
- Hush was originally intended to appear in a cancelled DTV set for The Batman. He was later set to be introduced in the episode "Rumors", but was ultimately replaced by series original character Rumor.
- Tommy Elliot appears in Gotham, portrayed by Cole Vallis in the first season and Gordon Winarick in the fourth. This version is a student at Anders Preparatory Academy who initially bullies Bruce Wayne. Elliot later apologizes to Bruce and becomes his friend.
- Tommy Elliot / Hush appears in Batwoman, portrayed primarily by Gabriel Mann and by Warren Christie while disguised as Bruce Wayne. This version is a real estate mogul with a grudge against Wayne Enterprises who indirectly contributed to killing Lucius Fox.

=== Film ===
- Hush makes a cameo appearance in Batman Unlimited: Mechs vs. Mutants, voiced by Dave B. Mitchell.
- Tommy Elliot and an original incarnation of Hush, Edward Nygma, appear in Batman: Hush, voiced by Maury Sterling and Geoffrey Arend, respectively.
- An original incarnation of Hush, Jason Todd, appears in Batman: Death in the Family, voiced by Vincent Martella.

=== Video games ===
- Hush appears in DC Universe Online, voiced by J. Shannon Weaver.
- Hush appears as a character summon in Scribblenauts Unmasked: A DC Comics Adventure.
- Tommy Elliot / Hush appears in Batman: Arkham City, voiced by Kevin Conroy. This version became a serial killer nicknamed the "Identity Thief" who dissects his victims' faces so he can reconstruct and graft Bruce Wayne's face onto himself to impersonate him and seek revenge. In pursuit of his goal, Elliot infiltrates the eponymous super-prison as part of a medical team so he can steal anesthetics before cutting his face off. After killing several inmates to complete his artificial face, Batman discovers his work. Nonetheless, Elliot successfully escapes Arkham City.
- Tommy Elliot / Hush appears in Batman: Arkham Knight, voiced again by Kevin Conroy. Amidst the Scarecrow and Arkham Knight's takeover of Gotham City, he infiltrates Wayne Tower by impersonating Bruce and holds Lucius Fox hostage in an attempt to steal Bruce's fortune. While rescuing Lucius, Batman unmasks himself before disarming Elliot, knocking him out with Lucius' help, and detaining him in the tower's vault.
  - This incarnation of Tommy Elliot / Hush also appears in the Batman: Arkham Knight prequel comic. Sometime after escaping Batman and Arkham City, he receives a sample of Clayface's body from the Arkham Knight, which he uses to quickly heal his surgery scars, in exchange for an alliance.
- Hush appears as a playable character in the mobile version of Injustice 2.

==== Lego Batman ====
- Hush appears as an unlockable playable character in Lego Batman: The Videogame.
- Hush appears as an optional boss and unlockable playable character in Lego Batman 2: DC Super Heroes, voiced by Cam Clarke.
- Hush appears as an unlockable playable character in Lego Batman 3: Beyond Gotham.

=== Podcasts ===
Taran Killam appears as Hush on WHO ME?, a Batman podcast hosted by Bobby Moynihan. Killam's version of the character uses "Too Shy" by Kajagoogoo as his entrance music.

== See also ==
- List of Batman family enemies
- Batman: Hush
