= Batman: Hush =

Story arc in Batman comics

- Cover of Batman #608 (December 2002), art by Jim Lee (pencils), Scott Williams (inks), and Alex Sinclair (colors).
- Publisher: DC Comics
- Publication date: October 2002 – September 2003
- Genre: Superhero
- Title(s): Batman #608–619
- Main character(s): Batman; Hush; Catwoman

Creative team
- Writer: Jeph Loeb
- Penciller: Jim Lee
- Inker: Scott Williams
- Letterer: Richard Starkings
- Colorist: Alex Sinclair
- Editor: Bob Schreck
- Volume 1: ISBN 1-4012-0060-5
- Volume 2: ISBN 1401200923
- Complete edition: ISBN 1401223176
- Deluxe hardcover: ISBN 1401229921
- Absolute edition: ISBN 1401204260

"Batman: Hush" is an American comic book story arc published by the comic book publishing company DC Comics featuring the superhero Batman. It was published in monthly installments within the comic book series Batman, running from issue #608–619 in October 2002 until September 2003. The story arc was written by Jeph Loeb, penciled by Jim Lee, inked by Scott Williams, and colored by Alex Sinclair, under the editorship of Bob Schreck.

The story depicts a mysterious stalker called Hush, who seems intent on sabotaging Batman from afar, and it includes many guest appearances by Batman's villains, as well as various members of the Batman Family and Batman's close ally Superman. It also explores the romantic potential between Batman and Catwoman.

== Publication history ==
The "Batman: Hush" storyline was published in monthly installments within the comic book series Batman, running from issue #608–619 (October 2002 – September 2003) by DC Comics. The first issue of the story arc was a success ranking 1st in the Top 300 comics for the October 2002 period with pre-order sales of 113,061. It was later collected into two volumes as hardcover and softcover, and later in 2005 in an oversized Absolute Batman: Hush hardcover slipcase. DC Comics released the story arc in one volume in August 2009. A hardcover collected edition featuring Jim Lee's artwork entirely in pencil form, titled Batman: Hush Unwrapped Deluxe Edition, was released on February 22, 2011.

== Plot ==
Batman is rescuing a boy kidnapped and held hostage by Killer Croc when Catwoman steals the ransom money. As Batman swings through Gotham City in pursuit of her, his grapple is cut and he falls to the ground, fracturing his skull. He is nearly killed by a group of criminals before he is saved by Huntress. His butler, Alfred Pennyworth, follows his instructions to summon Bruce's childhood friend Thomas Elliot, who is now a renowned brain surgeon. Dr. Elliot removes the skull fragments from Bruce's brain. Batman recovers and discovers that Poison Ivy used Catwoman to steal the ransom before taking the money from her. Catwoman is furious after learning that Ivy had used mind-control powers on her. Batman rescues Catwoman and a romance blooms between them. Batman eventually decides to trust Catwoman and reveals his identity to her. At this time, Killer Croc's increasing savageness due to his condition mutating allows him to escape from Arkham Asylum, with Batman tracking him. Killer Croc leads Batman to one of Poison Ivy's abandoned greenhouses. Before he can interrogate him further, Croc is captured.

Batman and Catwoman track Poison Ivy to Metropolis. There, Ivy has taken control of Superman and commands him to kill Batman. Batman observes that Superman is subconsciously resisting Ivy's influence, holding back in his attempts to kill. Using various weapons, including flashbang grenades, hypersonics, electroshock, and a kryptonite ring to defend himself, Batman stalls Superman while Catwoman lets Lois Lane fall from the Daily Planet building. Superman breaks free of Ivy's control to save Lois; he and Batman then capture Ivy.

Later, in Gotham City, Bruce Wayne, Selina Kyle, Leslie Thompkins, and Dr. Elliot are attending the opera Pagliacci, when Harley Quinn tries to rob everyone in the theater. In the ensuing struggle, Dr. Elliot is apparently shot dead by the Joker. Enraged, Batman begins to brutally beat the Joker, knocking out Harley Quinn and even Catwoman in the process when they tried to intervene. Batman attempts to kill the Joker but is then dissuaded by former police commissioner James "Jim" Gordon, who intervenes by superficially wounding Batman with a gunshot.

Dick Grayson returns to Gotham City for Elliot's funeral. Batman tells him of his suspicions that some mastermind is behind all his enemies behaving so out of character. Behind the scenes, a man with a bandaged face appears at all of the crime scenes, and seems to be orchestrating the plot. He comes to be referred to as Hush.

After foiling an armored car robbery by the Riddler, Nightwing and Batman discover evidence that Ra's al Ghul is also involved in what Batman has come to think of as a grand plot. Batman kidnaps Ra's' daughter Talia and leaves Catwoman to guard her while he seeks out Ra's, who reveals that someone from Bruce's past has used one of the Lazarus Pits. Catwoman is overpowered by Lady Shiva who has been sent to rescue Talia, but Talia knocks Shiva out and helps Catwoman recover from the attack. Returning to Gotham, Batman finds Catwoman being attacked by a delusional Huntress. Batman manages to have her knocked out. He then encounters the cause of the Huntress' attack, the Scarecrow, but overpowers him in a graveyard. He discovers that the current Robin, Tim Drake, has been captured by the former second Robin, Jason Todd, who had previously perished. (Note: During the events of the 1988 storyline "Batman: A Death in the Family".) In the ensuing fight, it becomes apparent that Clayface is mimicking the identity of Jason.

Batman then finds a device planted in his computer, which lead him to seek his old friend (and trusted mechanic) Harold. He has a late-night meeting with Harold, who has been missing for some time. (Note: Since the events of the 1999 "No Man's Land" storyline.) Harold admits that someone had treated his disfigured condition in exchange for planting that device, but he is shot and killed by Hush before he can name the mastermind. Thomas Elliot is discovered to be the trigger-man, and the face behind the bandages of the mastermind (it is later implied that Clayface had been mimicking Elliot when he appeared to be killed). Elliot held a grudge against the Wayne family since Batman's father, Dr. Thomas Wayne, had saved the life of Elliot's mother after a motor vehicle accident; Elliot had sabotaged his parents' vehicle in order to gain their inheritance, and considered Bruce's father as the one who did not allow his plan to be completed. In the ensuing confrontation, Elliot is shot by the reborn Harvey Dent and plummets into the water, with Batman never having a chance to unmask him (it is only assumed it is Thomas Elliot). His body is unable to be recovered.

In an epilogue to his face-off with Elliot, Batman discovers that the true mastermind behind the conspiracy is the Riddler. Batman realized it was Riddler when he didn't use the name in Elliot's medical records, but the name of the inventor of the crossword puzzle, Arthur Wynne. Riddler had used a Lazarus Pit to cure himself of terminal brain cancer, and during his time in the pit, deduced Batman's identity as Bruce Wayne. Having first approached Thomas Elliot with a cure for his mother's disease (the Lazarus Pit), the Riddler had instead allied with Elliot against Wayne. Riddler was also the only villain who Batman did not believe acted in an unusual way during this saga; the robbery Batman foiled was fairly typical of Riddler at the time. The Riddler also reveals that he and Elliot referred to the plot as the "Hush" plot. He further reveals that he knows Batman's identity as Wayne, but Batman is unfazed because a riddle which everyone knows the answer to would be worthless to Riddler. In addition, Batman warns that if Riddler reveals his secrets, it exposes Riddler as the culprit who used Ra's al Ghul's Lazarus Pit, who would then send the League of Assassins after him.

Another mystery begins troubling the Dark Knight. Even though the man he fought at the graveyard was revealed to be Clayface, Jason Todd's remains are still missing from his grave. The Riddler even taunts Batman of his greatest failure to save Jason's life, and refuses to reveal where Jason's body is, prompting Batman to knock out the Riddler.

Batman and Catwoman later meet. He continues to mistrust her and cannot be sure that she is not more aware of the plot than she admits. While trying to console him, Catwoman inadvertently tells him to "hush" seconds before trying to kiss him, provoking a fierce reaction from Batman that compels her to end the relationship. Before leaving, she says that she does not care if their relationship started out as a "spell". It works because of who they are, and someday he will learn to trust that. Batman also thinks that it may be possible "someday".

=== Aftermath ===
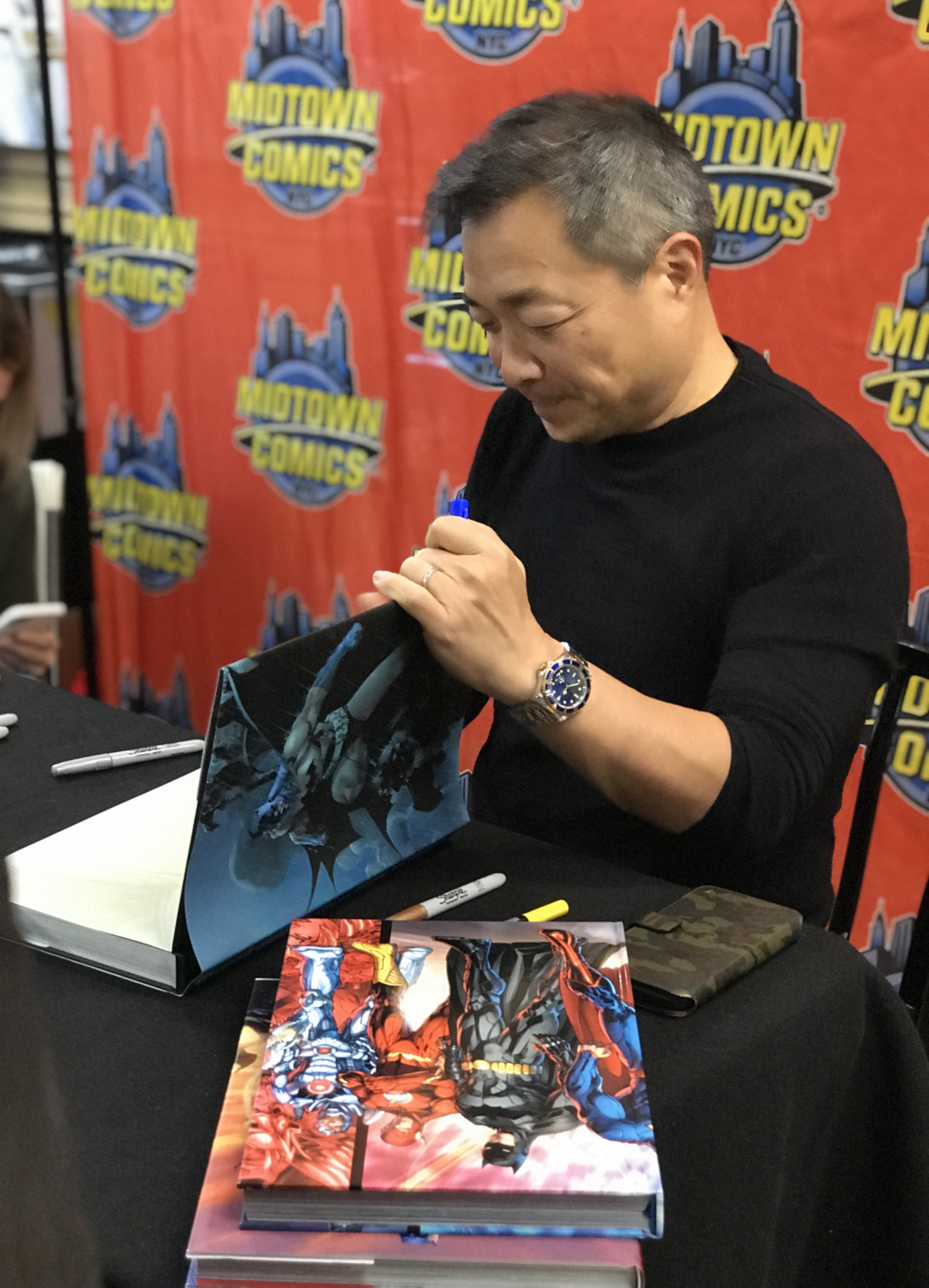
Artist Jim Lee signing a copy of the hardcover collected edition at Midtown Comics in Manhattan

After the story's success, Lee and Loeb were slated to follow the story up with another six issues, but the project failed to materialize. Hush's story was continued by AJ Lieberman in the now discontinued Batman: Gotham Knights title.

The plot element involving Jason Todd was later retconned in other Batman storylines. In the Under the Hood arc, it was revealed that Batman was actually fighting the real Jason Todd in the graveyard, who later switched places with Clayface. Todd is now a vigilante known as the Red Hood and aims to dominate Gotham's underworld through vicious tactics. It is also revealed that Batman had suspected that it was really Jason Todd he fought with; he secretly realizes that despite that the supposed impostor mimicked Dick Grayson and Tim Drake in skills, some of his maneuvers uncannily belonged to Jason. His former protégé had been stalking him since then. This is evident during the arc storyline "As the Crow Flies", where it is shown that Jason's mask was found in the Batmobile. After Jason revealed himself to Batman and kidnapped the Joker, he not only antagonizes Batman and his allies in Gotham but also clashes with the Teen Titans, Outsiders and Green Arrow as well. At the same time the Dark Knight has desperately tried to reach Jason in an effort to atone for his past failures. Following the 2005–2006 "Infinite Crisis" storyline, the Riddler spent a year in a coma and lost all memory of ever knowing that Batman was Bruce Wayne.

The "Hush" storyline was followed up in Paul Dini and Dustin Nguyen's storyline, "Heart of Hush", where Hush returns to get revenge on Batman through Catwoman and surgically changed his appearance to match Bruce Wayne's in an attempt to steal his identity. The series was praised for adding backstory and depth to the character of Hush while returning him to a credible threat. An origin story for Hush is given in Detective Comics #846–847.

In 2022, a 20th anniversary edition trade paperback of the original Hush storyline contained a newly produced epilogue. Written and drawn by the original authors Jeph Loeb and Jim Lee, it detailed how Hush escaped to an air pocket in a sunken boat at the bottom of the Gotham river after his defeat on the bridge. After performing surgery on himself to remove the two bullets from Harvey Dent's gun, Hush is shown to crawl ashore only to run into Harley Quinn and the Joker, who puts a gun to his head. The epilogue then ends with a To Be Continued.

In 2024, at New York Comic Con, it was announced that Loeb and Lee would be taking over the monthly Batman title for "Hush 2", starting with issue 158 in March 2025 and lasting six issues. It was also confirmed that Scott Williams, Alex Sinclar, and Richard Starkings would return as inker, colorist, and letterer respectively for the story.

== Alternate versions ==
In the 2019 anthology Tales from the Dark Multiverse, the Elliots are revealed to be the ones who raise Bruce Wayne instead of Alfred after Bruce's parents are killed. When Thomas Elliot's parents die in a car crash, he grows up to become the Senator of Gotham and CEO of Wayne Enterprises thanks to connections from his girlfriend, Talia al Ghul, the head of the League of Assassins. With the help of Gotham's other elites, they turn Gotham into a militaristic city-state, leading Barbara Gordon to form a rebellion group called the Outsiders after the corrupt police force murdered her father. He also had Bruce committed to Arkham Asylum with help from the facility's lead scientist, Dr. Jonathan Crane.

During the midst of a power struggle between the League of Assassins and the Court of Owls in the city, Crane and several other members of Gotham's elite are attacked and kidnapped by a man in a bat costume covered in bandages. Thomas initially receives protection from President Lincoln March's head of security from the Court of Owls, Richard Grayson, but the latter turns on him after realizing he and the Batman are connected and that Thomas was making a play for the Wayne family's fortune and presidency. The two are then captured by the Batman, who takes them to an underground prison with Gotham's other elite. Thomas is attacked by the masked man, known as the Silenced, who is revealed to be an insane Bruce Wayne. With Alfred's help, Bruce found out that Thomas had orchestrated the deaths of both of their parents as well as Jim Gordon's. Bruce and Alfred planted a handyman named Jack Napier in Arkham to fake Bruce's death and give him access to several inmates that taught him how to be a skilled warrior. He keeps Thomas and the rest of Gotham's elite in cages that are monitored by Jack and the now-delusional Alfred, who is set to inherit Wayne Industries. Talia begins dating President Lincoln March, and the Silenced sets his sights on taking down the Court of Owls and League of Assassins next.

== Critical reaction ==
IGN Comics ranked Vol. 1 and Vol. 2 of Batman: Hush #10 on a list of the 25 greatest Batman graphic novels, saying that "there are some truly unforgettable moments" and "Jim Lee's artwork is unbelievable". A similar list by Empire ranked the series #9 on a list of 11 essential Batman graphic novels.

== Collected editions ==
Title	Material collected	Published date	ISBN
Batman: Hush Volume One	Batman #608–612 and material originally published at dccomics.com	May 2003	978-1401200619
Batman: Hush Volume Two	Batman #613–618 and material from Wizard magazine #0	December 2003	978-1401200848
Batman: Hush	Batman #608–619 and material from Wizard magazine #0 and dccomics.com	August 2009	978-1401223175
Absolute Batman: Hush	Batman #608–619 and material from Wizard magazine #0 and dccomics.com	September 2005	978-1401204266
Batman: Hush Unwrapped	Batman #608–619 and material from Wizard magazine #0 and dccomics.com (pencils only)	July 2011	978-1401276492
Batman Noir: Hush	Batman #608–619 and material from Wizard magazine #0 and dccomics.com (pencils and inks only)	September 2017	978-1401258030
Batman: Hush 15th Anniversary Deluxe Edition	Batman #608–619 and material from Wizard magazine #0 and dccomics.com	November 2017	978-1401276492
Batman: Hush 20th Anniversary Edition	Batman #608–619, Prologue: The Aftermath and material from Wizard magazine #0 and dccomics.com	October 2022	978-1779517197
Batman: Hush: DC Compact Comics Edition	Batman #608-619 and material from Wizard #0	August 2024	978-1779527264

== In other media ==
=== Television ===
In March 2007, The Batman producer Alan Burnett stated that the an attempt was made to adapt the "Batman: Hush" story arc in the episode "Rumors", but DC executives convinced the production team not to do so, and the original villain Rumor, voiced by Ron Perlman, was created instead. In 2010, when Bruce Timm was asked if a Batman: Hush film would be released in the future as part of the DC Universe Animated Original Movies, he said that along with Batman: The Long Halloween, the story arc serves more as a comic than a film, but that Batman: Hush could also serve as a TV series.

=== Film ===
- After the successful reception of The Batman vs. Dracula, producer Jeff Matsuda tried to make a second The Batman film entitled The Batman vs. Hush, an adaptation of the Batman: Hush story arc. The film would have also involved the appearances of the Joker, Catwoman, Clayface, the Penguin, Mr. Freeze and the Riddler. The project was never materialized. Both Kevin Conroy and Mark Hamill teased doing a Batman: Hush animated film; Conroy claimed that although plans to make an adaptation had yet to begin, he would have loved to make it.
- An animated adaptation set in the DC Animated Movie Universe was released in 2019, featuring a "gauntlet of Batman villains including Poison Ivy, Ra's al Ghul, the Joker, and the bandage-faced mystery villain Hush". The film stars Jason O'Mara, Jerry O'Connell, Rebecca Romijn, Rainn Wilson, Sean Maher, Bruce Thomas, Vanessa Williams, and Stuart Allan who reprised their roles from previous DCAMU films with the new additions of Jennifer Morrison, Peyton R. List, Maury Sterling, Geoffrey Arend, Jason Spisak, Adam Gifford, Peyton List, and Dachie Alessio. The film was released on DVD and Blu-ray, and features a number of differences from the comics: Bane is the one who kidnaps the child instead of Killer Croc; Clayface takes the form of Riddler, imprisoned at Arkham Asylum, instead of Jason Todd; and the Riddler is revealed to be Hush instead of Thomas Elliot, whom the Riddler killed.
- In the interactive film, "Batman: Death in the Family", if the viewer chooses Jason Todd to survive Joker's torture, he keeps the bandages put on him after the attack and dons a darker Robin suit, becoming a violent vigilante. His appearance resembles how Jason looked in "Batman: Hush" when he pretended to be Hush.
