= Batman: Dark Moon Rising =

Two-part comic book series

"Dark Moon Rising"
- Publisher: DC Comics
- Publication date: January 2006 – March 2007
- Genre: Superhero
- Title(s): Batman: The Monster Men #1-6; Batman: The Mad Monk #1-6

Creative team
- Writer: Matt Wagner

Batman: Dark Moon Rising is a two-part comic book series written by Matt Wagner about the superhero Batman. It contains two six-part miniseries entitled Batman and the Monster Men and Batman and the Mad Monk. The two series take place after the events of Batman: Year One and before Batman: The Man Who Laughs.

== Batman and the Monster Men ==
Batman and the Monster Men has Batman have his first encounter with Professor Hugo Strange and his hulking Monster Men. It also introduces Julie Madison, as well as her father Norman, to the Post-Crisis continuity and revealing that Sal Maroni was involved in the funding for Strange's project on Arkham Asylum's patients.

=== Characters involved ===
- Bruce Wayne/Batman
- Julie Madison
- Professor Hugo Strange
- Sal Maroni
- Norman Madison
- James Gordon
- Alfred Pennyworth

=== Continuity changes ===
- Julie Madison is now a law student instead of an actress.
- Norman Madison is introduced.
- Sal Maroni is involved in the funding for Hugo Strange's project on Arkham Asylum's patients.

== Batman and the Mad Monk ==
Batman and the Mad Monk has Batman battling the vampiric Monk. Julie Madison and Norman Madison return.

=== Characters involved ===
- Bruce Wayne/Batman
- Julie Madison
- Norman Madison
- Alfred Pennyworth
- James Gordon
- The Monk
- Dala

=== Continuity changes ===
- Dala is not a vampire like she was in the original story.
- The Monk is now Niccolai, the vampiric leader of the cult known as the Brotherhood.
- Julie joins the UN Peace Corps and goes to Africa after the death of her father instead of becoming the Grace Kelly analogue Princess Portia Storme, ruler of Moldacia.
