= Batman and the Monster Men =

Comic book series (published 2006)

Publication information
- Publisher: DC Comics
- Schedule: Monthly
- Format: Limited series
- Publication date: January 2006- June 2006
- No. of issues: 6
- Main character(s): Batman; Hugo Strange; Sal Maroni; Julie Madison

Creative team
- Written by: Matt Wagner
- Artist: Matt Wagner
- Penciller: Matt Wagner
- Colorist: Dave Stewart

Batman and the Monster Men is an American comic book limited series written and drawn by Matt Wagner with colors by Dave Stewart, published by DC Comics in 2006 and starring the superhero Batman. It, along with its sequel Batman and the Mad Monk, are set in between the events of Batman: Year One and Batman: The Man Who Laughs. It is the first part of Matt Wagner's two-part Dark Moon Rising series, which are expanded and modernized versions of early Batman stories.

== Plot ==
Batman and the Monster Men is developed from an early Hugo Strange story from Batman #1. In Wagner's version, this is Batman's first encounter with Strange. The story depicts a young, optimistic Batman shortly after the events of Batman: Year One. Julie Madison, historically Bruce Wayne's love interest in early comics, is reintroduced in this series. Madison had not been seen as a regular supporting cast member since 1941, in Detective Comics #49. Batman and the Monster Men also gives a retroactive role to Sal Maroni, a character closely tied to the character Two-Face, as a crime boss funding Hugo Strange's experiments on Arkham Asylum patients. This story is intended to depict the first time Hugo Strange is involved in creating violent giants out of human patients.

== Continuity ==
This story and its sequel Batman and the Mad Monk take place in-between Batman: Year One and Batman: The Man Who Laughs. Jim Gordon has recently been promoted to captain and Edward Grogan has just replaced the corrupt, mob-affiliated Gillian "Gil" Loeb as Police Commissioner.

One of Batman's early encounters with a villain known as "the Red Hood" occurs some time shortly before this story begins, indicated by the fact that a newspaper headline depicted on the opening page reads: "Red Hood Gone? Eyewitnesses claim mystery thief falls to doom after Ace Chemical heist attempt foiled by run-in with vigilante Bat-Man". The incident at Ace Chemical, depicted as flashbacks in Batman: The Killing Joke, transformed the Red Hood into the Joker, who makes his first appearance in The Man Who Laughs.

Instead of being an actress as in her Golden Age incarnation, Julie is a freshly graduated law student.

Jim Gordon is shown to still be married to his first wife, Barbara Kean-Gordon, who leaves him shortly after the events of Batman: The Long Halloween and returns to him in Batman: Dark Victory.
