= Bat-Signal =

Distress signal device to call Batman

- Commissioner Gordon with the Bat-Signal; Art by Alex Ross.

Publication information
- Publisher: DC Comics
- First appearance: Detective Comics #60 (February 1942)

In story information
- Type: Signal
- Element of stories featuring: Batman

The Bat-Signal is a distress signal device appearing in American comic books published by DC Comics, as a means to summon the superhero Batman. It is a specially modified searchlight with a stylized emblem of a bat affixed to the light, allowing it to project a large bat symbol onto cloudy night skies over Gotham City.

The signal is used by the Gotham City Police Department as a method of contacting and summoning Batman in the event his help is needed, but also as a weapon of psychological intimidation to the numerous criminals of Gotham City. A civilian organization employs a liaison to the Gotham Police Department to activate the Bat-Signal, owing to a legal precedent in which the police department would have to take responsibility for Batman's investigative tactics, should he be operating as their agent.

The signal doubles as the primary logo for the Batman series of comic books, TV shows, and films. To celebrate Batman's 80th anniversary, DC Comics and Warner Bros. lit a Bat-Signal in thirteen cities on September 21, 2019, starting in Melbourne and ending in Los Angeles.

== Origins ==
The Bat-Signal's debut in Detective Comics #60 (February 1942).

The Bat-Signal first appeared in Detective Comics #60 (February 1942). The signal has several different origins in comics featuring post-Crisis continuity. It is introduced as a new tool after Batman's first encounter with the Joker in the 2005 series Batman: The Man Who Laughs, and also during the 1990 "Prey" storyline in Legends of the Dark Knight.

In the 2006 series Batman and the Mad Monk, Commissioner James Gordon initially uses a pager to contact Batman, but during a meeting with the superhero, Gordon throws it away, saying he prefers a more public means of contacting him. After Batman departs, Gordon looks out at the city and considers the exceptional view from his current position, hinting at the future creation of the Signal.

== Additional appearances ==
Bat-Signal's projection displaying onto the skies above Gotham City from its police department headquarters, summons Batman, provides hope to its people, and intimidates criminal elements. From Batman: Legends of the Dark Knight #6 (April 1990). Art by Klaus Janson.

- In Detective Comics #466 (1976), Signalman traps Batman inside the Bat-Signal.
- In issue #6 of the 1989 series Legends of the Dark Knight, a group of crime bosses projects the signal upside down to summon Batman to help them fight a killer they cannot defeat.
- Catwoman uses the Bat-Signal in the 1996 special The Long Halloween.
- In the 1999 miniseries Batman: Dark Victory, after Batman asks for the Riddler to offer his insight into the riddles of the new villain Hangman, the Riddler uses the Signal to summon Batman after he's finished his analysis. Later in the series, the Hangman sneaks onto the roof of Police Headquarters and turns the Bat-Signal on to lure then-recently appointed Commissioner Gordon to the roof and try to kill him, but is thwarted when Two-Face cuts Gordon down.
- In the 1996 series Batman: Haunted Knight, Scarecrow alters the Bat-Signal to notify Batman that he has kidnapped Gordon. By adding an orange bulb and painting "eyes" on the signal, he turns the beam into a stylized Jack-o'-lantern image.
- At the beginning of the 1999 No Man's Land story arc in Batman, a junior officer creates an improvised Bat-Signal out of spare parts. Gordon smashes it to pieces as he is angry at Batman as he believes that the vigilante abandoned Gotham. Oracle also builds a small Bat-Signal to summon Batman.
- In the 2002 comic book series Gotham Central, it is explained that Batman's existence is not officially recognized by the Gotham City authorities, and the police claim to Gotham citizens that the Bat-Signal is merely a method of using the Batman "urban legend" to intimidate Gotham's criminal underworld. Owing to the events in the "War Crimes" storyline, relations between Batman and the Gotham City Police Department are officially severed, and as a result, the Bat-Signal is removed from the roof of Gotham Central.
- In the 2014 series Batman Eternal, the Bat-Signal is shattered by new Commissioner Jack Forbes as part of his campaign against Batman, Cluemaster ties Batman to the Bat-Signal before unmasking him and carving the bat symbol onto his chest, but Bruce manages to escape his bonds. A new signal is installed on the roof of the GCPD as Gordon is released and Batman's reputation is redeemed.

== In other media ==
=== 1949 Columbia serial ===
The Bat-Signal appears in Batman and Robin (1949). This version is a high-powered projector kept in Commissioner Gordon's office. When needed, Gordon moves the Bat-Signal to his office window and shines it directly into the sky.

=== 1960s ===
The Bat-Signal appears in Batman (1966). It is occasionally used in the series, however Commissioner Gordon generally contacts Batman using a dedicated phone line (the Batphone).

=== Gotham ===
The Bat-Signal appears in Gotham. This version is a repurposed police floodlight.

=== Arrowverse ===
The Bat-Signal appears in Batwoman. In the series' pilot episode, Gotham City mayor Michael Akins intends to turn off the Bat-Signal forever due to Batman's disappearance. The Bat-Signal was later destroyed by Alice, with Luke Fox building a replacement.

=== Titans ===
The Bat-Signal appears in the season finale of Titans, titled "Dick Grayson", in a dream world created by Trigon.

=== The Penguin ===
The 2024 finale of The Penguin ends with the Bat-Signal shining in the sky over Gotham.

=== Live-action film ===
==== Burton/Schumacher series ====
In Tim Burton's 1989 film Batman, Batman gives the signal to the police as a gift so that they can summon him when he is needed after he defeats the Joker.

The Bat-Signal as it appears in the 1989 film Batman

In Burton's 1992 sequel Batman Returns, Batman has mirrors stationed atop Wayne Manor that reflect the Bat-Signal through his window, alerting him to its presence in the night sky.

In Joel Schumacher's 1995 sequel Batman Forever, Chase Meridian uses the Bat-Signal to call Batman. Later, the Riddler alters the Bat-Signal by projecting a question mark into the sky with the Bat-symbol forming the dot at the base.

In Schumacher's 1997 film Batman & Robin, Poison Ivy alters the Bat-Signal by changing it to a "Robin-Signal" to lure Robin into a trap.

==== Nolan series ====
In Batman Begins, Jim Gordon finds Carmine Falcone strapped onto a searchlight in the docks of Gotham City, for the Gotham Police force to arrest him, left by Batman. Gordon then notices that Falcone's shadow is projected into the clouds of the night sky, similar to the silhouette of a bat. At the end of the film, the Bat-signal appears, as a searchlight that projects the shape of a bat, installed atop police headquarters as a means to contact Batman.

In the 2008 sequel The Dark Knight, Gordon uses the Bat-Signal to remind Gotham of Batman's presence. The signal proves to be very effective, with drug dealers and criminals becoming apprehensive at its very appearance. At the end of the film, after reluctantly agreeing to let Batman take the blame for the murders committed by Harvey Dent to preserve Dent's image as Gotham's hero, Gordon hesitantly destroys the signal using an axe in front of various members of the police force and the press.

In the 2012 film The Dark Knight Rises, the rusted remains of the destroyed Bat-Signal are still atop police headquarters. However, at the end of the film, with Batman declared dead, Gordon sees a restored Bat-Signal, providing hope that Batman has survived.

==== DC Extended Universe ====
The Bat-Signal in the 2016 film Batman v Superman: Dawn of Justice, with Ben Affleck (left) as Batman

In Batman v Superman: Dawn of Justice, the Bat-Signal is first referenced when Superman lands in front of the Batmobile, causing it to crash into an empty warehouse. Superman tears the car open to inform Batman not to respond the next time they shine his light in the sky. Later, believing Superman responsible for the bombing of Congress, Batman activates the Bat-Signal himself to draw Superman to Gotham to confront him, unaware that Lex Luthor is manipulating them both into combat so that Superman will either be killed by Batman's kryptonite spear or compromise his image by killing Batman to save his mother. During the battle, the Bat-Signal is destroyed when Superman throws Batman into it.

The Bat-Signal appears again in Justice League and its director's cut.

==== The Batman (2022) ====
The Bat-Signal is a major plot point in the 2022 film The Batman. Unknown to anyone, Gotham Police Lieutenant James Gordon flashes the signal in the sky from one of the old Gotham Renewal Project buildings as a mode of contacting and meeting with Batman. Batman and Gordon use the signal to call each other to the location to meet and discuss. Batman in his opening monologue states that the signal also creates another purpose of spreading fear among Gotham's criminal element, as a warning. Criminals and thugs often are scared when looking at the signal as they think Batman's nearby and abandon their plans, fleeing the scene, which as Batman puts it, is an effective way of using fear as a tool, since he cannot be everywhere.

=== Animation ===
==== DC Animated Universe ====
The Bat-Signal in the 1993 film Batman: Mask of the Phantasm

In 1992's Batman: The Animated Series, the signal was built by Commissioner Gordon in "The Cape and Cowl Conspiracy". Barbara Gordon uses it to contact Batman in "Heart of Steel" when she believes that an impostor has replaced her father.

In the 1993 film Batman: Mask of the Phantasm, Batman is being hunted by the police as a suspect in the recent murder of several gang lords (a crime committed by the Phantasm), and Bullock, under orders from Councilman Arthur Reeves, tries to use the Bat-Signal to lure him in. Batman, knowing that it is a trap, does not respond.

The Bat-Signal is not used in the 1999 series Batman Beyond, save for one appearance, as Police Commissioner Barbara Gordon both has a direct line to the Batcave and is not as cooperative with the original Batman and his successor as her father was. The one appearance of the signal is in "Ascension", where Paxton Powers has a small replica of it built to summon the new Batman, Terry McGinnis. Terry destroys it upon arrival.

==== The Batman ====
In the episode "The Cat, the Bat, and the Ugly" of the animated TV series The Batman, Batman has just foiled a plot that The Penguin tried to pull on top of a lighthouse. After talking to Ellen Yin, Batman is standing in front of the lighthouse light when the Bat Signal appears in the sky. In the second-season finale, "Night in the City" after newly inducted Commissioner Gordon finally agrees to ally with Batman; he begins using the Bat-Signal. After that, his "Batwave" alarm was rarely used.

==== The Lego Batman Movie ====
At the beginning of The Lego Batman Movie, Commissioner Gordon attempts to use the Bat-Signal to alert Batman only for it to be egged by Egghead thus disabling it. Later Batman uses the Bat-Signal to make different versions of the symbol for Robin, Barbara, Alfred, and many of Batman's allies summoning them to team up and defeat the Joker.

==== Batman: Gotham by Gaslight ====
In Batman: Gotham by Gaslight, when Selina Kyle is being pursued by Jack the Ripper in an empty fair, she uses her blood and a spotlight to create a makeshift Bat-Signal to attract Batman's attention.

==== DC Super Hero Girls ====
In the DC Super Hero Girls animated short "#BatCatcher", Batgirl mistakenly believes she is summoned by the Bat-Signal when in reality the shadow is cast from a real bat inside her bedroom. In the episode "#FromBatToWorse", Batgirl unsuccessfully tries to use a Bat-Signal flashlight to call Batman for help against Poison Ivy.

==== Harley Quinn ====
In the Harley Quinn episode "You're a Damn Good Cop, Jim Gordon", an overworked and depressed Commissioner Gordon starts excessively using the Bat-Signal to contact Batman for petty things like having someone to talk to about his failing marriage. Batman gets so annoyed that he confiscates the Bat-Signal. By the end of the episode, they make amends and Batman restores it.

=== Video games ===
- The Bat-Signal appears in DC Universe Online (2011), on top of the GCPD 9th station in the East End of Gotham. It is the focus of a side mission to see places related to major DC Universe figures.
- The Bat-Signal appears in the Batman: Arkham series. It is first seen in Batman: Arkham Asylum (2009) in the sky of Gotham City. During his Scarecrow-induced nightmares, Batman must sneak through the remains of Arkham Asylum and defeat a gigantic Scarecrow by aiming the Bat-Signal at him. The Bat-Signal is also used in Batman: Arkham City (2011) as a waypoint in the sky that hovers high above the location of the player's objective, while the original signal is located at the now-abandoned GCPD building as the subject of a Riddler challenge. The usage of the Bat-Signal as a waypoint continues in Batman: Arkham Origins (2013) and Batman: Arkham Knight (2015), though the signal itself appears only in the latter game. At the end of Arkham Knight, Batman initiates the Knightfall Protocol, which includes the destruction of the Bat-Signal via a built-in explosive added by Lucius Fox. In Batman: Arkham Shadow (2024), Batman, under his Matches Malone alias, sets the Bat-Signal alight with a Molotov cocktail to get himself landed in Blackgate Prison.
- In Batman: The Telltale Series (2016) and Batman: The Enemy Within (2017), the Bat-Signal is located on the roof of the GCPD Headquarters and is used to summon Batman multiple times across the two games.

== See also ==
- Bat phone
