= Huntress (DC Comics) =

Several fictional characters in the DC comics universe

- Helena Wayne as Huntress in Wonder Woman (vol. 1) #299 (January 1983), art by Joe Staton (pencils) and Bob Smith (inks), and Adrienne Roy (colors).
- Publisher: DC Comics
- First appearance: Sensation Comics #68 (August 1947)
- Created by: Mort Meskin
- Characters: Paula Brooks; Helena Wayne; Helena Bertinelli; Julie Madison (Earth-19)

The Huntress Huntress
- : The Huntress #1 (April 1989), featuring the Helena Bertinelli version of the character, art by Joe Staton.

Series publication information
- Publisher: DC Comics
- Schedule: Monthly
- Format: (vol. 1); Ongoing series (vol. 2); Limited series
- Genre: Superhero
- Publication date: (vol. 1); April 1989 – October 1990 (vol. 2); June – September 1994
- Number of issues: (vol. 1); 19 (vol. 2); 4
- Main character(s): Helena Bertinelli; Paula Lian Brooks

The Huntress is the name of several fictional characters appearing in American comic books published by DC Comics, commonly in association with the superhero Batman. The two best-known women to bear the Huntress name are Helena Bertinelli and Helena Wayne, the latter being from an alternate universe. Although Helena Wayne and Helena Bertinelli are both superheroes, the Huntress of the Golden Age was a supervillain. An alternate version of Julie Madison becomes the Huntress in Batman: Gotham by Gaslight: A League for Justice, set on Earth-19.

== Characterization ==
=== Paula Brooks ===
The Golden Age Huntress was a supervillain with the real name of Paula Brooks who battled the superhero Wildcat, first appearing in Sensation Comics #68. She joined the second Injustice Society of America and stole Plymouth Rock. She married fellow supervillain the Sportsmaster.

The character was later retroactively renamed the Tigress in the pages of Young All-Stars. These stories took place prior to her villainous career. At this point, the young Paula Brooks was a superheroine, and fought both Nazis and criminals as a Young All-Stars member.

=== Helena Wayne ===
The Bronze Age Huntress was Helena Wayne, the daughter of the Batman and Catwoman of Earth-Two, an alternate universe established in the early 1960s as the world where the Golden Age stories took place.

Created by Paul Levitz, Joe Staton, and Bob Layton, her first appearance was in All Star Comics #69 (December 1977) and DC Super Stars #17, which came out the same day and revealed her origin. She appeared in Batman Family #17-20 when it expanded into the Dollar Comics format for its last few issues. The bulk of her solo stories appeared as backup features in issues of Wonder Woman beginning with issue #271 (September 1980).

Helena's parents trained her to be a superb athlete. After finishing school, she joined the law firm of Cranston and Grayson, where Dick Grayson, alias Robin, was a partner.

Helena began her superhero career when a criminal blackmailed her mother into resuming action once again as Catwoman—an act that eventually led to her death. Helena, deciding to bring the criminal responsible to justice, created a costume for herself, fashioned some weapons from her parents' equipment (including her eventual trademark, a crossbow), and set out to bring in the criminal. After accomplishing this, Helena decided to continue to fight crime as Huntress.

In All Star Comics #72, Helena formally joined the Justice Society of America where she struck up a friendship with fellow new superheroine Power Girl. As a JSA member, she participated in several of the annual JLA/JSA meetings, most of which took place on Earth-One. Helena was also briefly associated with the superhero group Infinity, Inc.

During the 1985 miniseries Crisis on Infinite Earths, Helena was killed while attempting to save the lives of several children. After Crisis ended, Helena Wayne's existence, like that of her parents and Earth-Two's Dick Grayson, was retroactively erased from the remaining Earth and the world no longer remembered her.

==== The New 52 ====
Helena Wayne as Huntress in Huntress (vol. 3) #4 (March 2012); art by Marcus To.

In the final issue of 52, a new multiverse is created, with Huntress appearing as a native of Earth-2. As prefigured by comments from Grant Morrison, this new alternate universe is not the original/Pre-Crisis Earth-Two and ensuing Justice Society of America exploration disclosed that this Helena Wayne/Huntress was a member of the Justice Society Infinity, Earth-2's merged JSA and Infinity, Inc. and was in a relationship with Dick Grayson/Robin in this world. Since Power Girl briefly visited that world, there has been no subsequent depiction of the new Helena Wayne/Huntress of Earth-2.

In September 2011, The New 52 rebooted DC's continuity. In this new timeline, the Huntress is re-established in 2012 in the ongoing series Worlds' Finest, along with Power Girl. In this series, the Huntress is in reality Helena Wayne from Earth 2. She and Power Girl, who is Superman's cousin on Earth 2, were mysteriously hurled to the mainstream DC Universe after a battle with Darkseid's minions. A retrospective prequel to the series disclosed that her mother was the former Catwoman (Selina Kyle).

=== Helena Bertinelli ===
Helena Bertinelli as the Huntress on a splash page of The Huntress #1 (April 1989), art by Joe Staton (pencils) and Bob Smith (inks), and Robbie Busch (colors).

Following the 1985 miniseries Crisis on Infinite Earths, the Helena Wayne version of the Huntress was removed from continuity. DC Comics introduced a new version of the Huntress with the same first name and physical appearance, and with a similar costume, but with an entirely different backstory and personality.

The pre-New 52 Huntress was Helena Rosa Bertinelli (in some early appearances, Helena Janice Bertinelli), the daughter of a powerful Gotham mobster and sole survivor of a mob hit that wipes out her entire family. Swearing revenge, Helena dubs herself the "Huntress" and trains from childhood to become a ruthless vigilante. During the "No Man's Land" story line, she temporarily assumes the role of Batgirl, but not alongside Batman (whom the citizens believe abandoned them).

Batman considers her to be too unpredictable and violent. Others in the Batman family feel differently; Nightwing had a brief romantic fling with her, while she and Tim Drake share a good professional relationship. Early in his career he worked with the female vigilante, and later cleared her name in a murder case. Batman sponsors Huntress's membership in the Justice League, and for some time, Huntress was a respected member of the League. Under the guidance of heroes such as Superman, she grew in confidence, but was forced to resign after Batman stopped her from killing the villain Prometheus.

The emergence of Bertinelli as the Huntress has not kept DC from occasionally paying homage to the Helena Wayne incarnation of the character. During a Post-Crisis JLA-JSA team-up, Bertinelli was so impressed with the skill and prowess of the Flash (Jay Garrick), Hippolyta, and Wildcat, stating humbly, "I wanna join the Justice Society . . . " Additionally, Power Girl sought her out for someone to talk to, even though the two have never really interacted.

The character was featured in the comic book series Birds of Prey from 2003 onwards as a member of the eponymous team. Although she is still depicted as prone to excessive violence, she became a valuable member of the team.

In the alternate timeline of the 2011 "Flashpoint" storyline, Huntress joined the Amazons' Furies.

== In other media ==
=== Television ===
==== Live-action ====
- The Helena Wayne incarnation of the Huntress appears in Legends of the Superheroes, portrayed by Barbara Joyce.
- The Helena Wayne incarnation of the Huntress, renamed Helena Kyle, appears in Birds of Prey, portrayed by Ashley Scott.
  - Helena Kyle makes a cameo appearance in "Crisis on Infinite Earths", portrayed again by Ashley Scott.
- The Helena Bertinelli incarnation of the Huntress appears in the first two seasons of Arrow, portrayed by Jessica De Gouw.

==== Animation ====
- The Helena Wayne incarnation of the Huntress was considered to appear in Batman Beyond.
- The Helena Bertinelli incarnation of the Huntress appears in Justice League Unlimited, voiced by Amy Acker.
- The Helena Bertinelli incarnation of the Huntress appears in Batman: The Brave and the Bold, voiced by Tara Strong.
- A character inspired by Paula Brooks/Huntress named Paula Nguyen appears in Young Justice, voiced by Kelly Hu.

=== Film ===
- The Helena Bertinelli incarnation of the Huntress appears in Birds of Prey, portrayed by Mary Elizabeth Winstead.
- The Helena Bertinelli incarnation of the Huntress makes a non-speaking appearance in Injustice.
- The Helena Wayne incarnation of the Huntress appears in Justice League: Crisis on Infinite Earths - Part One, voiced by Erika Ishii.

=== Video games ===
- The Helena Bertinelli incarnation of the Huntress appears as an unlockable playable character in Justice League Heroes, voiced by Vanessa Marshall.
- The Helena Bertinelli incarnation of the Huntress appears as an unlockable playable character in Lego Batman: The Videogame.
- The Helena Bertinelli incarnation of the Huntress appears as a boss and playable character in DC Universe Online, voiced by Claire Hamilton.
- The Helena Bertinelli incarnation of the Huntress appears as an unlockable playable character in Lego Batman 2: DC Super Heroes.
- The Helena Bertinelli incarnation of the Huntress, based on Jessica De Gouw's portrayal, appears as a playable DLC character in Lego Batman 3: Beyond Gotham.
- The Helena Bertinelli incarnation of the Huntress appears in Lego DC Super-Villains, voiced by Sumalee Montano.

=== Miscellaneous ===
- The Helena Bertinelli incarnation of the Huntress appears in The Batman and Robin Adventures #19.
- The Helena Bertinelli incarnation of the Huntress appears in issue #2 of the Justice League Unlimited tie-in comic book series.
- The Arrow incarnation of Helena Bertinelli / Huntress appears in the non-canonical Arrow: Season 2.5 tie-in comic book.
- The Helena Bertinelli incarnation of the Huntress appears in the Injustice: Gods Among Us.
- The Helena Wayne incarnation of the Huntress appears as part of Lego's DC Super Heroes minifigures series.

== Reception ==
Michael Eury and Gina Misiroglu characterized the original Huntress Paula Brooks as "a relatively obscure Golden Age villainess". When that title was borrowed next for Helena Wayne, the reviewers found her "intriguingly distinguished by her parentage". This incarnation of the Huntress "so enthralled DC readers fascinated by the heroine's lineage and motivation" that she was spun out into her own successful series. When the character was eliminated by DC's Crisis on Infinite Earths series, it "was too popular to fully jettison from the DC universe". Consequently, the Huntress incarnation of Helena Bertinelli was introduced in her own series, and also used in a number of other media.

Gladys L. Knight remarks that the Huntress Helena Wayne starts her career fighting criminals to avenge her mother's death, but unlike Catwoman she "fights on the right side of the law and is indeed distraught over her mother's criminal past". Knight found the Huntress' storylines thrilling.

== See also ==
- List of Batman supporting characters
- List of Batman family enemies
