= Sal Maroni =

Fictional DC Comics character

- Sal Maroni's mugshot

Publication information
- Publisher: DC Comics
- First appearance: Detective Comics #66 (August 1942)
- Created by: Bill Finger (writer); Bob Kane (artist)

In-story information
- Alter ego: Salvatore Vincent Maroni
- Species: Human
- Team affiliations: Maroni Crime Family
- Notable aliases: The Boss, The Italian, Morelli, Anton Karoselle
- Abilities: Criminal mastermind Expert marksman

Salvatore Vincent Maroni is a fictional character appearing in American comic books published by DC Comics, commonly in association with Batman. The substantial character is portrayed as a powerful mob boss and gangster of Italian descent in Gotham City and an enemy of Batman. Maroni is most famous for disfiguring Harvey Dent, setting the stage for the young district attorney's transformation into the supervillain Two-Face.

In live-action, Maroni has appeared in the film The Dark Knight (2008), portrayed by Eric Roberts, the TV series Gotham (2014), portrayed by David Zayas, and the HBO miniseries The Penguin (2024), portrayed by Clancy Brown.

== Publication history ==
Sal Maroni first appeared in Detective Comics #66 and was created by Bill Finger and Bob Kane.

== Fictional character biography ==
=== Pre-Crisis/Earth-Two ===
Maroni's first pre-Crisis appearance was in Detective Comics #66 (August 1942) as Boss Moroni, a mobster on trial for the murder of a man named "Bookie" Benson. Harvey Kent (original name of the character) is the prosecutor at the trial. He calls Batman as his first witness. During Batman's testimony, Moroni calls Batman a liar, leading Kent to show his proof: Moroni's lucky two-headed silver dollar was found at the scene with his fingerprints on it. Enraged, Moroni throws a vial of acid at Kent, horribly disfiguring his face. Driven insane by his disfigurement, Kent becomes the gangster Two-Face and eventually kills Maroni before surrendering and going to prison.

=== Bronze Age/Earth-Two ===
During Bronze Age recountings of Two-Face's origin, Maroni's role was unchanged, but his name was changed to Morelli. Harvey Kent's surname was altered to Dent, which has become that character's permanent name. In this version, Batman is present at the trial and tries to prevent the mobster from throwing the acid, but is unable to prevent Dent from being disfigured.

Prior to Crisis on Infinite Earths, Maroni appeared in DC Superstars #14 and Batman #328 to #329. He survives an assassination attempt by Two-Face in the first story, but his legs are left paralyzed. In the latter story arc, he undergoes plastic surgery to alter his appearance and changes his name to Anton Karoselle to avoid attention. He then exacts revenge on Two-Face by killing his former wife Gilda's new husband Dave Stevens, allowing the gangster to find him and gun him down in retaliation.

=== Post-Crisis ===
In the graphic novel Batman and the Monster Men, Maroni lends money to Norman Madison (father of Bruce Wayne's girlfriend Julie Madison) to cover his debts, and to Professor Hugo Strange for his genetic experiments. After Maroni puts pressure on Strange to repay his loan, Strange responds by robbing one of his illegal gambling establishments to steal the money he needs to pay Maroni off. When Maroni realizes Strange may be responsible for the robbery, he sends enforcers to intimidate and threaten him. Strange decides to get rid of Maroni once and for all, and sends another creature to kill him. Maroni is saved by Batman, who as a favor to Julie Madison, forces him to call off her father's debt.

In the sequel, Batman and the Mad Monk, Norman tries to pay off his debt to Maroni, unaware of Batman's intervention on his behalf; Maroni refuses to take the money, terrified that Batman would visit him again. Norman instead gives the money to rival mobster Carmine Falcone, which humiliates Maroni. Later, near the end of the story, Norman tries to kill Maroni, only to be gunned down by his men.

Maroni is featured prominently in Jeph Loeb's maxi-series Batman: The Long Halloween, which retells Two-Face's origin. In this version, Salvatore Maroni is the scion of the Maroni crime family, headed by his father Luigi Maroni. He is the most powerful mobster in Gotham next to Carmine Falcone and has notorious enforcer Tony Zucco as one of his henchmen. Both Sal Maroni and Falcone believe that the serial killer Holiday (so named for assassinating mobsters on holidays) is working for the other, which strains their previously ironclad business relationship. When his father is killed by Holiday, Maroni makes a deal with Dent to reveal all of Falcone's criminal activities in exchange for leniency.

However, Falcone's daughter Sofia — Maroni's secret lover — visits him in jail, where she falsely claims Dent, not Falcone, is responsible for the killings and his father's death. Prior to his court appearance, Dent's corrupt assistant Vernon Fields provides Maroni with "stomach medicine" for a supposed ulcer. During the trial, Maroni throws the disguised acid into Dent's face, disfiguring him. Maroni then gets into a scuffle with a bailiff who shoots him twice in the chest, which he survives. While being moved out of his cell, Maroni is killed by Holiday. The killer is revealed to be Alberto Falcone, who committed the murders to make a name for himself independent of his family. Maroni was resurrected following The New 52 continuity reboot.

== Other versions ==
- Sal Maroni appears in the Elseworlds story Citizen Wayne. This version is an Al Capone-esque crime lord from the 1930s who is involved in bootlegging, was accused of tax evasion, and scarred all of Harvey Dent's face in an attempt to kill him. Maroni is later killed by Dent, who became Batman to seek revenge on him.
- Sal Maroni appears in Batman: Earth One (vol. 2). This version is an enforcer of Gotham's late corrupt mayor Oswald Cobblepot, who kills Harvey Dent with a Molotov cocktail during a prison riot orchestrated by the Riddler.

== In other media ==
=== Television ===
Sal Maroni (portrayed by David Zayas) as depicted in Gotham.

Salvatore Maroni appears in the first season of Gotham, portrayed by David Zayas.

=== Film ===
Sal Maroni (portrayed by Eric Roberts) as depicted in The Dark Knight (2008).

- Boss Maroni makes a cameo appearance in a flashback depicted in Batman Forever, portrayed by Dennis Paladino.
- Sal Maroni appears in Batman: Gotham Knight, voiced by Rob Paulsen.
- Sal Maroni appears in The Dark Knight, portrayed by Eric Roberts. This version is the successor of the Falcone crime family following Carmine Falcone's incarceration instead of a rival.
- Sal Maroni appears in Batman: The Killing Joke, voiced by Rick D. Wasserman.
- Sal Maroni appears in Batman: The Long Halloween, voiced by Jim Pirri.

=== The Batman franchise ===
- Sal Maroni makes a minor appearance in The Batman, portrayed by an uncredited extra.
- Sal Maroni appears in The Penguin, portrayed by Clancy Brown. This version is incarcerated at Blackgate Penitentiary, is married to Nadia Maroni, through whom he possesses connections to Iranian organized crime, and is the father of Taj Maroni who later dies of a heart attack.

=== Video games ===
Sal Maroni appears in Batman: Arkham Shadow, voiced by Troy Baker.

=== Miscellaneous ===
Sal Maroni appears in Batman '66: The Lost Episode #1.
