= Bat phone =

Jargon for a telephone or number for important calls

A bat phone or batphone, in popular jargon, is a private telephone number for important telephone calls handled at high priority. The term is also used to describe the use of more than one mobile phone, with the "bat phone" reserved for a specific purpose. The name Bat-Phone was popularized by the Batman television series starting in 1966, when it was depicted as a red phone that Commissioner Gordon used to summon the superhero Batman in emergencies, and as the red phone mounted inside the Batmobile, the car driven by Batman. Technology journalists have also used "Bat Phone" to describe devices that are novel in appearance, or have a connection to the Batman franchise.

== Origins in Batman ==
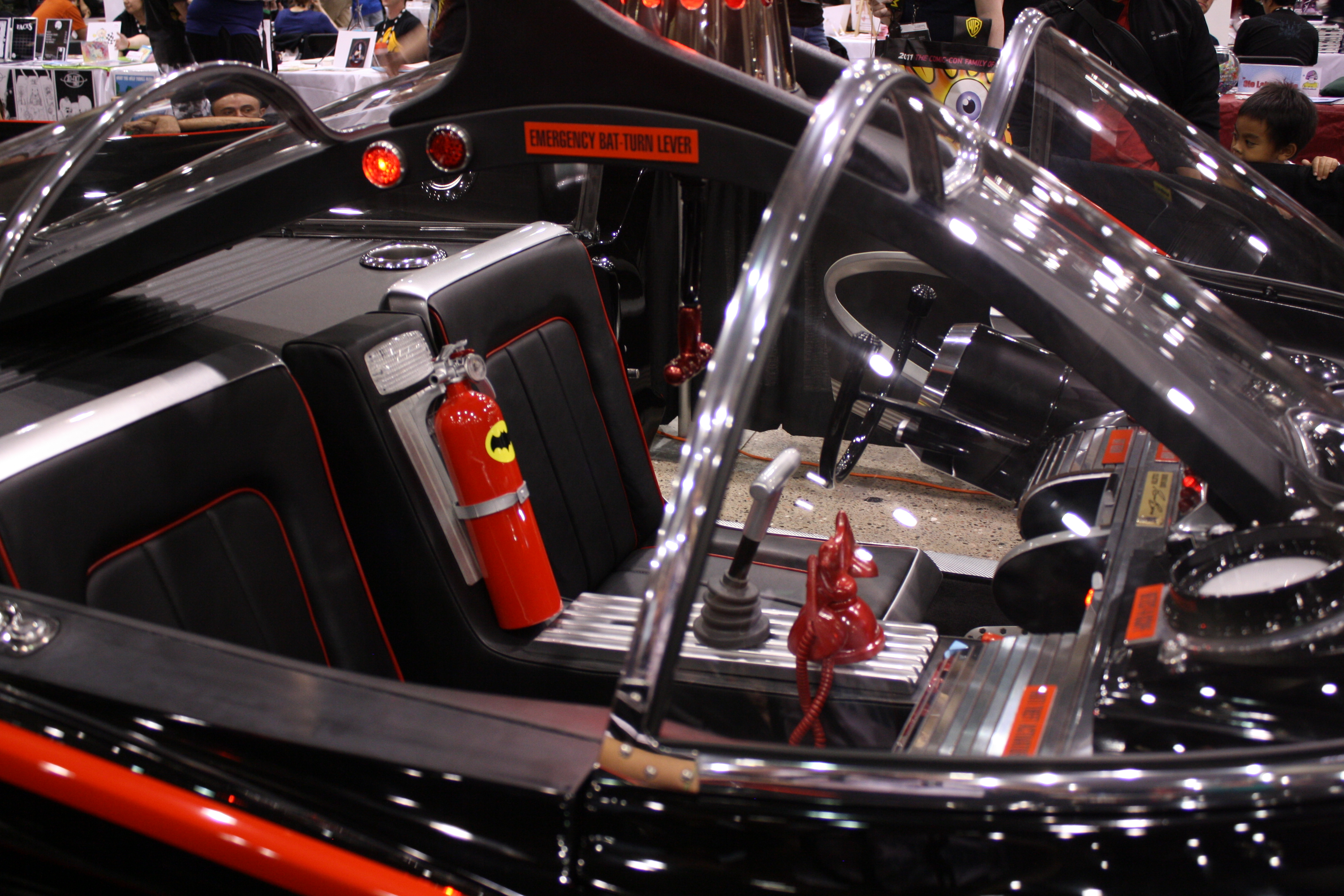
Red Bat-Phone mounted inside Batmobile at Montreal Comiccon 2011

=== Bat-Phone and Hot-Line ===
The term originated with the red phone which Commissioner Gordon of the Gotham City Police Department uses to call Batman in the Batman television show of 1966 to 1968. Enclosed in a glass cake dome, this emergency phone was called the Bat-Phone, and glowed red when it rang. In the series, Batman played by Adam West is able to receive calls from the police commissioner on the mobile Bat-Phone in the Batmobile, in his study at Wayne Manor, and in the Batcave.

The fictional communications system was first introduced in June 1964 as the "Hot-Line" in Detective Comics No. 328, which depicts a tape recorder in the Batcave for incoming messages, and Batman Comics No. 164/1, showing an extension mounted inside the Batmobile. In DC Comics No. 329 (July 1964), the Hot-Line has been installed inside of Wayne Manor, and is blue rather than red. A note from the editors explained, "The Hot-Line provides a direct connection between police headquarters and Batman's Batcave." In 75 Years of DC Comics, author Paul Levitz credits editor Julie Schwartz for the concept, noting that the Hot-Line "forever [silenced] curious kids who demanded to know why a searchlight was the best way to summon a hero whose headquarters is in a cave."

=== Precursor to cellular phone ===
The Bat-Phone installed in the Batmobile shown in the Batman TV series helped to raise interest in wireless communications technology among American consumers starting in the 1960s, along with the mobile shoe phone depicted in Get Smart and the hand-held communicators which appeared in Star Trek. However, it was not until the 1980s that some consumers had access to the first mobile telephone, and not until the 1990s that they became "cheaper, smaller, and more readily available."

== Usage in other contexts ==
=== Business ===
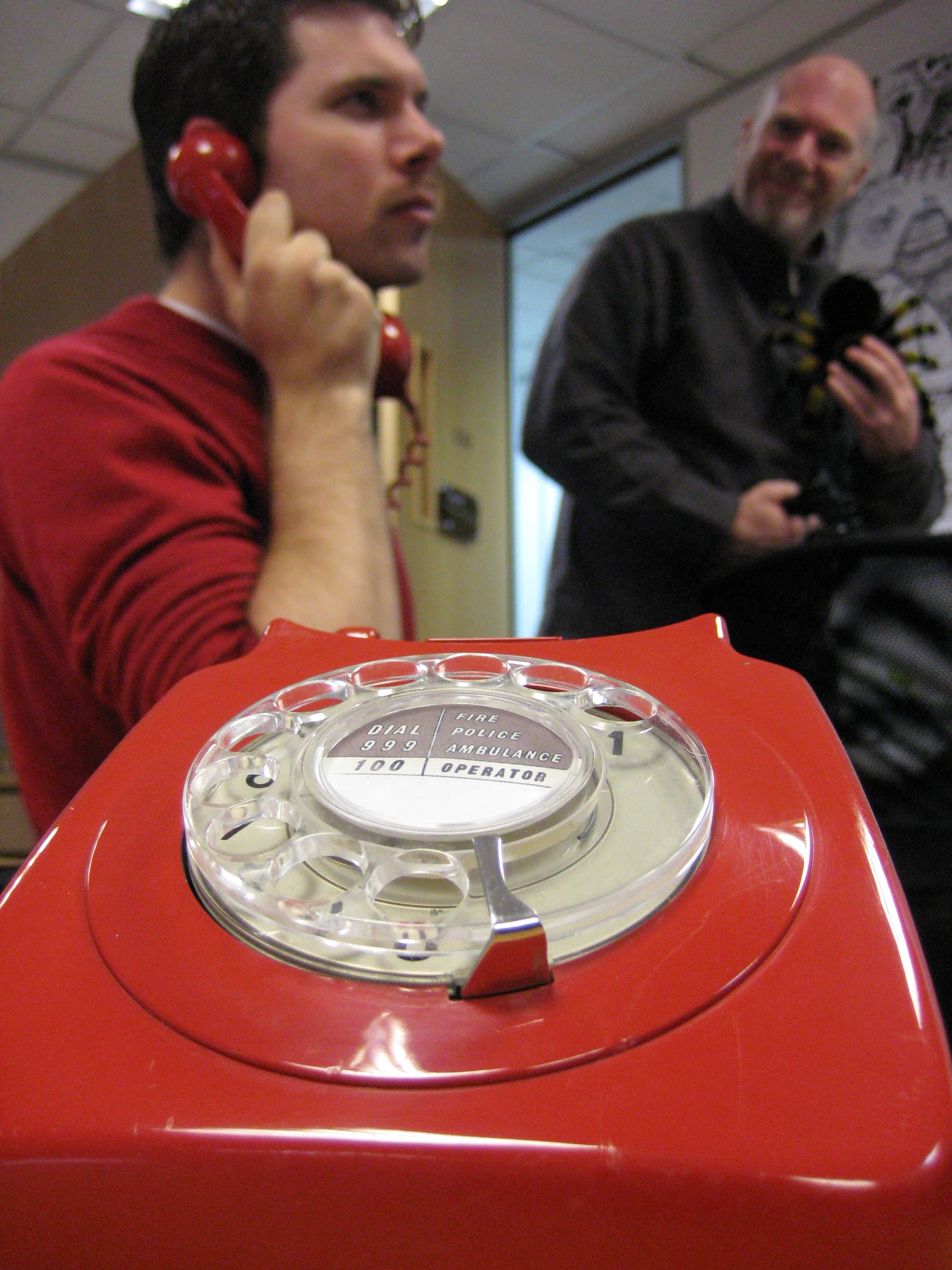
Classic red telephone mimicking the Bat Phone (2007)

In business, a bat phone has come to mean a private telephone number that has higher priority than a number that is more "public". A bat phone can also refer to the use of a second mobile phone reserved for a dedicated purpose, or for specific callers.

In 2002, Leading Authorities on Business noted that former Amazon CEO Jeff Bezos carried a mobile phone with a number he gave out only to a select group of people, including "his wife, his top suppliers, a few critical subordinates, his management team, and members of his board of directors." Whenever his "bat phone" rang, Bezos made it a priority to take the call, regardless of whether he was in a meeting, or in conversation with someone else, enabling him to respond quickly to critical issues.

A 2005 New York Times article on cellphone etiquette in the workplace reported that many interviewees "said they had long ago crossed the line where they used the cell like a Batphone for emergency calls only."

In 2011, The Essential Phone Interview Handbook advised job hunters to get a separate phone number to give out to potential employers, rather than using a household landline. Author Paul J. Bailo wrote, "When Batman is working on the Batmobile and he hears the Bat Phone ring, he knows it's Commissioner Gordon calling Batman on an important mission. Before Batman even picks up the phone, his head is in the game. He knows this is a serious phone call. Your Bat Phone plays the same role for you and your job search."

=== Government and national security ===
In the United States, "bat phone" has been used to refer to a direct line to government officials, often in connection with national security.

In 2002, in the wake of the 9/11 attacks, the Business Roundtable, an association of 150 CEOs, announced that it was developing a secure communications network to communicate with government leaders and with each other in the event of a terrorist attack or natural disaster. The project was called the Critical Emergency Operations Link, or CEO Link, and was billed as a "CEO 'Batphone' project" by InformationWeek.

In 2003, the United States Department of Homeland Security started installing secure phone lines connected with the governor's office and state emergency operations center in each state, which The Atlanta Journal-Constitution characterized as "reminiscent of the red 'bat phone' in the 1960s 'Batman' television show but far more sophisticated". The secure lines allowed federal officials in Washington, D.C., to "discuss classified intelligence with top state officials in an emergency, such as a terrorist strike" and other sensitive matters related to security.

In 2007, Reuters reported that New York Mayor Michael Bloomberg told a United States Senate Committee that the only calls he received on the secure "bat phone" installed in his kitchen were from insurance salespeople or those offering magazine subscriptions. When reporters asked him afterwards how telemarketers managed to find the secret phone number, Bloomberg explained, "You can dial a number at random and eventually get to everyone in the world."

The term has also been used to suggest or deny that certain individuals may have undue influence on the American government. In 2001, lobbyist Michael Scanlon told a newspaper that fellow lobbyist Jack Abramoff had a "relationship" with President George W. Bush, saying, "He doesn't have a bat phone or anything, but if he wanted an appointment, he would have one". In 2012, Israeli newspaper Haaretz claimed that Dennis Ross, who had joined the Washington Institute for Near East Policy, had a secure line to the Obama White House in his office. The Obama administration denied this was the case, with the spokesperson for the State Department emailing The Atlantic, "He has not been issued any kind of bat phone, red phone, funny phone, etc."

=== Emergency services ===
In the United Kingdom, all National Health Service (NHS) hospitals have red emergency telephones, referred to as "bat phones". Paramedics call the bat phone in the hospital accident and emergency (A&E) departments, to alert staff that a patient requiring urgent and immediate attention is on their way. Starting in 2009, the Nottingham University Hospital NHS Trust implemented a programme to admit stroke patients directly to the hyper-acute stroke unit rather than through A&E, using a "bat phone" with a separate ring tone and flashing light to alert ward staff prior to the patient's arrival.

The term "bat phone" is used similarly in Australia, where hospital emergency departments are equipped with "a phone without a dial" with "a peculiar ring or siren", which paramedics call from the ambulance.

In commercial aviation, the satellite-enabled telephone line which enables pilots or cabin crew to contact doctors on behalf of passengers requiring medical attention has been referred to colloquially as "The Batphone".

=== Media ===
American journalists often refer to Bat Phones to describe the media's direct access to well-placed sources. Journalist Jim Rutenberg has characterized real estate developer Donald Trump's regular calls to the New York Post with tips in the 1990s as being "like the bat phone". In 2017, in response to a question from CNN Reliable Sources about "if it's ever awkward to be having to cover the Murdoch family while at a Murdoch paper", The Wall Street Journal media reporter Joe Flint said, "I do not have a Rupert Murdoch bat phone on my desk."

=== Criminal activity ===
Criminal investigations and trials in North America have pointed to the use of burner phones dubbed "Bat phones" by defendants to coordinate illicit activity, such as Insider trading. In 2009, a massive insider trading scheme involving the Galleon Group led by Raj Rajaratnam was said to use prepaid cellphones participants called "bat phones" in order to avoid possible detection by authorities. Similarly, the insider trading case involving gambler Billy Walters, Dean Foods Co. CEO Tom Davis testified that starting in 2011, the two men communicated via a "Bat Phone" which Walters had purchased for this specific purpose. Walters would call Davis and suggest meeting for coffee, which was "a signal for Davis to call back on the Bat Phone to relay insider information".

=== Customer service ===
In 2000, Air Transport World reported that Northwest Airlines was handing out cellphones which connected customers directly with reservation agents while waiting inside the airport terminal during weather-related flight delays and cancellations. Referred to as "The Batphone", it allowed the airline to address customers' immediate needs with rebooking their flights, while allowing the gate agents to focus on issuing new boarding passes.

In 2001, Medical Meetings observed that The Expo Group, a general contractor for VPN Con, started distributing "bat phones" to its largest clients, embedded with an Internet connection that allowed them to bypass long-distance telephone carriers to reach their account representatives.

In 2022, Bloomberg.com said that tax preparation professionals were frustrated that their "bat phone" to the Internal Revenue Service, a dedicated customer service line which was previously answered immediately by an IRS representative, was now putting them on hold due to staffing shortages at the IRS.

== Devices ==
=== Speakerphone ===
In a 1998 gadget review, Macworld magazine commented that the Polycom SoundStation Premier EX speakerphone was "totally cool-looking" and said that Macworld editors had "taken to calling it the Batphone" based on its appearance.

=== Mobile phones ===
In 2006, a widely syndicated article originally published in The Dallas Morning News described a $1,275 cellphone designed by Bang & Olufsen, the Serene, as trapezoid in shape when folded, but said "when unfolded, it resembles the Bat Phone".

Limited edition mobile phones, designed to tie in with the Batman superhero franchise, have also been referred to as Batphones by the media. In 2008, Verizon Wireless introduced the Nokia 6205 The Dark Knight edition mobile phone, which was "clad in a mysterious black color and embellished with a subtle The Dark Knight emblem, and [featured] a themed-edition flip phone design". Journalist Philip Potempa wrote, "even though Verizon Wireless, Warner Bros. and Nokia refuse to make this connection, I'm calling this cell phone model 'The new Batphone'".

== Telephony ==
=== Private-Line Automatic Ringdown ===
In telephony, the "bat phone" automatically connecting Commissioner Gordon's office with Batman is often cited as a metaphor for Private-Line Automatic Ringdown (PLAR). By linking two statically configured endpoints over VoIP, users who urgently need to reach a specific party can connect by simply picking up the phone without dialing.

== Other media ==
- In the TV series Entourage, the character Ari Gold played by Jeremy Piven is an aggressive talent agent who calls his cell phone a "bat phone", which he is obligated to answer when it rings three times.
- Arctic Monkeys has a song called "Batphone" on their album Tranquility Base Hotel & Casino with the lyrics, "I'll be by the batphone if you need to get ahold".

== See also ==
- Hotline
- Bat-Signal
- Moscow–Washington hotline
