= Julie Madison =

- Julie Madison in Batman vol. 2, #33 (Sept. 2014); Art by Greg Capullo and Danny Miki

Publication information
- Publisher: DC Comics
- First appearance: As Julie Madison: Detective Comics #31 (September 1939); As Huntress: Batman: Gotham by Gaslight: A League for Justice #3 (November 2025)
- Created by: Gardner Fox (writer); Bob Kane (artist); Sheldon Moldoff (Illustrator)

In-story information
- Supporting character of: Batman
- Notable aliases: Huntress (Earth-19)

Julie Madison is a fictional character appearing in American comic books published by DC Comics, commonly in association with the superhero Batman. The character first appeared in Detective Comics #31 (September 1939) and was created by Gardner Fox, Bob Kane, and Sheldon Moldoff. She is best known as being Batman's first significant romantic interest. An alternate version of the character becomes the Huntress in Batman: Gotham by Gaslight: A League for Justice, set on Earth-19.

The character made her live-action debut in the 1997 film Batman & Robin, played by Elle Macpherson.

The character made her animated debut in the Amazon Prime Video series Batman: Caped Crusader, voiced by Grey DeLisle.

== Publication history ==
Julie Madison first appeared in Detective Comics #31 (September 1939) and was created by Gardner Fox, Bob Kane, and Sheldon Moldoff.

== Fictional character biography ==
=== Original version ===
Only four issues after Batman's own debut, Julie Madison first appeared in Detective Comics #31. She made her last appearance in the Golden Age of Comics in Detective Comics #49 (March 1941).

She is originally portrayed as an oft-imperiled socialite who is engaged to Bruce Wayne and is unaware of his secret life as Batman. She fears that Bruce will never be anything but a spoiled, lazy playboy; she is fascinated with Batman, considering him her ideal man. In her first appearance, she is used as a pawn in the Monk's battle with Batman.

Detective Comics #40 established her as an actress. In this issue she and her costars are targeted by the deranged actor Basil Karlo (aka the original Clayface) who is angry for not being given the chance to star in a remake of a movie he had previously appeared in.

Julie Madison as seen in the early days of the Batman comic books.

Julie makes her last appearance in the early series in Detective Comics #49. In this episode, the head of the film studio and his publicity agent get her to adopt the stage name "Portia Storme" (inspired by Portia of William Shakespeare's The Merchant of Venice and the fact that her last performance had "taken the world by storm"). Julie ends her engagement to Bruce. The split is amicable and they remain on good terms. Batman and Robin intervene when Clayface escapes from custody and again goes after Julie. In the course of capturing the villain, she becomes the first female to don the Robin costume as part of a complicated deception.

Julie Madison reappeared in two World's Finest stories in the 1970s as Princess Portia, ruler of the fictional country of Moldacia.

=== Post-Crisis ===
The six issue mini-series Batman and the Monster Men by Matt Wagner, published in 2006, is set early in the current post-Crisis version of Batman's career, and re-introduces Julie Madison. This version of the character is a law student, and the daughter of Norman Madison, a failing businessman who borrows money from mobster Sal Maroni. Bruce Wayne cares deeply for Julie, but is reluctant to tell her the secret of his nighttime activities. Julie herself suspects that Bruce is hiding something from her.

Julie takes on further importance in Wagner's follow-up mini-series Batman and the Mad Monk. Like Monster Men, this series retells an early story from Batman's publishing history: his conflict with the Monk. As in the original, Julie sleepwalks into the Monk's lair and is bitten by the Monk, becoming his thrall. The Monk attempts to manipulate Julie into signing over her father's finances to his supernatural cult. In the end, Batman saves Julie, but her father is killed by Sal Maroni's thugs. Distraught, she leaves Bruce and Gotham and goes to Africa as a volunteer member of the Peace Corps.

Julie later makes a flashback appearance in Batman #682 as Darkseid's minions invade Batman's mind and distort his memories. In Batman's early days, she tells Alfred Pennyworth to inform Bruce she is leaving for Hollywood to try to make it as an actress; Batman later does not realize or recall that she has left.

=== The New 52 ===
In "The New 52" continuity reboot, Julie Madison debuts in the beginning of the "Savage City" storyline, the final act of "Zero Year". There she only appears in a flashback/dream sequence, in which she is dating Bruce, who is one of her classmates. She reappears in the last issue of the storyline, this time in the present time, as she has moved back to Gotham and wants to be reunited with Bruce. Alfred imagines what it would be like if Bruce and Julie got together and made a family, allowing Bruce to have a life beyond Batman. Bruce cannot meet with Julie because he is busy with crime fighting, much to Alfred's displeasure.

In Batman (vol. 2) #43, Julie is the head of a clinic for underprivileged youth that Bruce Wayne is helping to finance and manage. After the events of Batman: Endgame - which sees Bruce having been left with no memories of his life as Batman after his last battle with the Joker - Bruce has begun a relationship with Julie and works for her in the clinic. Together, they visit Wayne Manor, which Geri Powers has purchased and returned to Bruce, only to be attacked by the Riddler, Mr. Freeze, and Clayface. In the course of their relationship, Julie reveals that her father was a former gunrunner who likely sold Joe Chill the gun that he used to kill Bruce's parents, but Bruce maintains that it does not matter, even expressing a desire to marry her. When Bruce deduces his past as Batman and concludes that he must restore his memories to stop Mister Bloom, Julie helps Alfred complete the process that will restore Bruce's memories of his life as Batman at the cost of destroying all the memories he gained during his amnesia. She expresses acceptance of the fact that Gotham needs Batman more than she needs Bruce, considering it appropriate in a twisted way that she should 'end' Bruce Wayne's new life just as her father contributed to his original end by selling Chill the gun that killed the Waynes.

== Other versions ==
- An alternate universe version of Julie Madison appears in the Gotham by Gaslight sequel Master of the Future, set on Earth-19. She later becomes the Huntress in Batman: Gotham by Gaslight: A League for Justice.
- An alternate universe version of Julie Madison appears in Batman: Dark Knight Dynasty.
- An alternate universe version of Julie Madison appears in Superman & Batman: Generations.
- An alternate universe version of Julie Madison appears in Batman: Legends of the Dark Knight #94.

== In other media ==
- Julie Madison makes a minor appearance in Batman & Robin, portrayed by Elle Macpherson. This version is Bruce Wayne's fiancée.
  - Madison appears in the tie-in novelization, in which Wayne publicly breaks up with her while under Poison Ivy's control.
- Julie Madison appears in the Batman: Caped Crusader episode "Nocturne", voiced by Grey DeLisle.
