= Batman: The Man Who Laughs =

2005 comic book by Ed Brubaker and Doug Mahnke

- Cover of Batman: The Man Who Laughs

Publication information
- Publisher: DC Comics
- Format: One-shot prestige format comic book
- Publication date: 2005
- No. of issues: 1
- Main characters: Batman; Joker; James Gordon

Creative team
- Written by: Ed Brubaker
- Artist: Doug Mahnke
- Colorist: David Baron

Batman: The Man Who Laughs is a one-shot prestige format comic book written by Ed Brubaker and drawn by Doug Mahnke, released in February 2005, and intended as a successor to Batman: Year One.

It tells the story of Batman's first encounter with the Joker in post-Zero Hour continuity. The plot is based on the Joker's original introduction in Batman #1 (1940).

The title is a reference to the film adaptation of Victor Hugo's 1869 novel The Man Who Laughs, whose make up for the main character was one of the original inspirations for the Joker.

The story has been reprinted, in both hard and softcover, with Detective Comics #784–786—a storyline entitled "Made of Wood" (pairing Batman with the Green Lantern, Alan Scott) also written by Brubaker with art by Patrick Zircher.

== Plot summary ==
Captain James Gordon and other officers are investigating a building filled with disfigured corpses; they have chalk-white skin, green hair, red lips, and rictus grins. Batman appears and pledges to find the killer.

Next, Bruce Wayne is seen at a social event talking to fellow millionaire Henry Claridge. On a TV in the next room, a reporter is overheard announcing that Arkham Asylum is being reopened. She suddenly begins laughing and soon dies with a face similar to the corpses. The Joker then walks onto camera and announces he will kill Claridge at midnight.

Bruce leaves the party and as Batman meets up with Gordon at Arkham. On a cell wall, the Joker has written, "One by One, they'll hear my call. Then this wicked town, will follow my fall." Gordon then has police stationed in Claridge's house to protect him. Claridge begins laughing as his face turns white and his lips pull back into a rictus. Batman crashes down through a window, but is too late to save Claridge. Meanwhile, on the streets of Gotham, the Joker enters the Williams Medical Center. After killing the security guards, he arms the inmates and releases them on the streets. Batman arrives and stops several inmates, and reveals his existence to the people on the streets.

While Bruce conducts research in the Batcave, the Joker appears on television again and threatens to kill Jay W. Wilde, another millionaire industrialist. Batman deduces that Claridge was killed with a time-released poison and tells Gordon to run a blood test on Wilde. Gordon does so, but nothing is found. Gordon is at Wilde's estate with other officers when a police helicopter crashes outside the estate. The Joker then appears and releases poison smoke bombs into the building. The Joker shoots Wilde with a bullet dipped in his toxin, killing him, and escapes.

Meanwhile, Batman reflects on his encounter months earlier with a masked criminal called the Red Hood who fell into a vat of toxic waste at the Ace Chemicals Processing Plant. He theorizes that the Red Hood was disfigured by the chemicals and became the Joker, and killed Claridge and Wilde because they were major investors in the plant. He disguises himself as a reporter and goes to the plant, where he interviews several workers, one of whom has patches of white on his face similar to the Joker's skin. When asked about his appearance, the worker replies that it came from the chemical waste created from the plant spilling onto his face, and goes on to mention that another worker, who had stuck his entire hand into a vat of the waste, had dyed his arm hairs green.

The Joker threatens to kill Judge Thomas Lake and Bruce Wayne. Police officers are at both men's houses, with Gordon at Lake's. Bruce starts laughing and turns white, having given himself a non-lethal dose of the toxin so he could get away from police custody. His butler, Alfred Pennyworth, administers a drug to slow his heart rate to slow the spread of the poison. Meanwhile, a gang of armed men dressed as clowns drive onto Lake's property where a shoot-out takes place. Bruce hallucinates about the night his parents were murdered, and realizes that the Joker means to poison Gotham's water supply as revenge for his disfigurement. He awakes, fully recovered, in an ambulance, and changes into the Batsuit. The Joker's men shoot at the ambulance, but Batman defeats them.

Batman takes a police motorcycle and contacts Gordon via radio. He tells Gordon that Bruce Wayne is alive and that he figured out the Joker's plan. He tells Gordon to have the water to the city shut off. Gordon contacts the reservoir, but receives no answer. Batman heads there himself to stop the Joker from poisoning the water supply. Batman meets up with the Joker, who successfully poisons the city's water supply, but Batman, having previously rigged the viaduct with explosives, detonates it, preventing the poisoned water from going into the city. Batman defeats the Joker, and briefly contemplates dropping him into the poisoned water to avenge his victims. However, he cannot bring himself to do so, and instead has the Joker imprisoned at the newly reopened Arkham Asylum. Batman meets with Gordon, who unveils to him the new Bat-Signal.

== Continuity ==
While the story seems to take place directly after Year One, the beginning is tied into the ending of Batman and the Mad Monk, in which Gordon reveals the warehouse of corpses.

The New 52 storyline "Death of the Family" references the story during Batman's part of the arc, in that Joker was recreating all of his first crimes, but with a twist on how he did it last time. For example, the news report that plays on TV is a man dressed up as the Joker to announce his next crime shortly before being shot. It is revealed that the man was John Claridge, son of Henry Claridge, the Joker’s first victim in The Man Who Laughs. The Joker then poisons the mayor's security guards, but instead of smiles they all wear mutilated frowns. When Batman and the Joker finally face off at the reservoir, the Joker reveals that since the people closest to the reservoir would have been poisoned before Batman or Nightwing detonated the viaduct anyway, he took the liberty of drowning the residents of nearby condos prior to Batman's arrival, and detonated the aqueduct while Nightwing was still on it. He not only recreated the crime, he stopped it before Batman did so that they could have time to talk.

== Critical reaction ==
Critical reaction to The Man Who Laughs has been mostly positive. Hilary Goldstein of IGN Comics said that The Man Who Laughs "lack[s] the smooth pacing and adept dialogue of [Alan] Moore's The Killing Joke, [but] this is a worthy companion to the classic Joker tale." Goldstein added, "Brubaker's take on the Joker feels incredibly authentic." Goldstein later ranked The Man Who Laughs #23 on a list of the 25 best Batman graphic novels.

Don MacPherson of The Fourth Rail felt that The Man Who Laughs "rob[s] the Joker of some of his mystery" but said that Brubaker and Mahnke "capture the chilling nature of the Joker's insanity and bloodlust, not to mention the intensity of the Batman." MacPherson in particular praised "how well [Brubaker] brings Jim Gordon to life."
