= Batman and the Mad Monk =

Comic book limited series by Matt Wagner

- Cover art to Batman and the Mad Monk #3. Art by Matt Wagner.

Publication information
- Publisher: DC Comics
- Schedule: Monthly
- Format: Limited series
- Publication date: October 2006 - March 2007
- No. of issues: 6
- Main character(s): Batman; Jim Gordon; Julie Madison; The Monk

Creative team
- Written by: Matt Wagner
- Artist: Matt Wagner
- Colorist: Dave Stewart

Batman and the Mad Monk is an American comic book limited series, featuring the DC Comics superhero Batman published in 2006–2007. It is set during the Batman: Year One continuity, but after the events of Batman and the Monster Men and before the events of Batman: The Man Who Laughs. It is the second part of Matt Wagner's two-part Dark Moon Rising series, which are expanded and modernized versions of Golden Age Batman stories.

== Plot ==
Batman must counter sinister machinations and new dimensions of wickedness as he confronts the hooded menace of the Mad Monk, his first encounter with a supernatural villain. He also must deal with the direct repercussions of the events in Batman and the Monster Men.
