= Batman: Year One =

1987 comic book story arc

- Cover of Batman #404, the first part of the storyline. Art by David Mazzucchelli.

Publication information
- Publisher: DC Comics
- Publication date: February – May 1987
- Main characters: Batman; Jim Gordon

Creative team
- Written by: Frank Miller
- Artist: David Mazzucchelli
- Letterer: Todd Klein
- Colorist: Richmond Lewis
- Editor: Dennis O'Neil

Collected editions
- Trade Paperback: ISBN 0930289331
- Hardcover: ISBN 0930289323
- Trade Paperback (Warner Books): ISBN 0446389234
- Trade Paperback (Titan Books): ISBN 1852860774
- 2005 Deluxe Edition (Hardcover): ISBN 1401206905
- 2005 Deluxe Edition (Trade Paperback): ISBN 1401207529
- 2012 Deluxe Edition: ISBN 1401233422
- Book with Blu-ray & DVD set: ISBN 1401260047
- Absolute Edition: ISBN 1401243797
- 2017 Deluxe Edition: ISBN 1401272940
- Artist's Edition: ISBN 9798887240039

"Batman: Year One" is an American comic book story arc written by Frank Miller and illustrated by David Mazzucchelli. "Year One" was originally published by DC Comics in Batman #404-407 in 1987. The story recounts Batman's first year as a crime-fighter as well as exploring the life of recently transferred Gotham police detective Jim Gordon, building towards their first encounter and their eventual alliance against Gotham's criminal underworld.

== Plot ==
Billionaire Bruce Wayne returns home to Gotham City after twelve years abroad, training for a one-man war against crime. James "Jim" Gordon moves to Gotham with his pregnant wife, Barbara, after a transfer from Chicago. Both are already acquainted with the corrupt and violent atmosphere of the city, but because Jim assaulted a corrupt officer without obtaining evidence, he is so disgraced that no other police force will take him. Jim focuses on purging corruption from the Gotham City Police Department after witnessing his partner, Arnold Flass, abuse his power. Several officers led by Flass beat him on orders from his superior, Commissioner Gillian Loeb, and threaten to do the same to Barbara if he continues cracking down on corruption. In revenge, Jim tracks Flass down, beats him, and leaves him naked and handcuffed in the snow.

Bruce believes he is still unprepared to fight crime despite the skills he learned abroad. He goes in disguise on a surveillance mission in Gotham's red-light district but is drawn into a brawl with several prostitutes, including Holly Robinson and Selina Kyle. Police officers shoot Bruce and take him away in their patrol car. Bruce breaks free, subdues the cops, flees from the scene, and returns to Wayne Manor barely alive. He sits before his father's bust, requesting guidance in his war against crime. A bat crashes through a window and settles on the bust, inspiring Bruce to save Gotham as Batman.

Jim diffuses a hostage situation without any deaths or injuries, leading the press to hail him as a hero, which inhibits Loeb and his cronies from acting against him. With Bruce striking as Batman, street crime significantly declines. Flass is attacked while accepting a bribe from Jefferson Skeevers, a drug dealer of Carmine Falcone. Jim becomes obsessed with apprehending Batman. Batman infiltrates the mansion of Gotham's mayor and threatens all the dinner party guests, including Loeb and Falcone. Jim and GCPD Sergeant Sarah Essen witness Batman save an old lady from a runaway truck and summon more GCPD officers to the scene, forcing Batman to flee into an abandoned building. Loeb personally deploys in a police helicopter and drops bombs onto the building. A SWAT team led by a trigger-happy commander, Branden, is sent in to continue the manhunt. Batman uses a signal device to attract a swarm of bats from the Batcave, concealing his escape.

Jim and Essen have an affair for two months, before Jim finally ends it out of guilt. Weeks later he confesses the affair to Barbara. Jim apprehends Skeevers, but Batman persuades Assistant District Attorney Harvey Dent to let him out on bail. Batman uses the opportunity to terrorize Skeevers into testifying against Flass.

Bruce sneaks into Falcone's manor as Batman and overhears a conversation between Falcone and his nephew, Johnny Viti. An attack by Kyle, now a professional burglar, interrupts before he can record any useful evidence, but he hears enough to surmise Falcone and Viti intend to target Gordon's family. Jim leaves home on Loeb's orders but becomes suspicious when he spots Bruce entering his home parking lot on a motorcycle at high speed. Jim turns back, to discover Viti and his men holding Barbara and their newborn son James hostage. With sleep deprivation causing Jim to be paranoid and abnormally violent, he opens fire on Viti's men. Viti flees the scene with James. Bruce tries to intervene, but Jim shoots him and takes the motorcycle to chase Viti. Jim and Viti fight on a bridge until James falls. Bruce catches up on a stolen bicycle, leaps over the bridge's railing, and saves James. Jim, unable to identify Bruce due to losing his glasses in the fight, lets him go. Flass supplies Dent with the evidence and testimony needed to implicate Loeb, who resigns in disgrace. Jim is promoted to captain and prepares to meet with Batman to investigate a plot orchestrated by a criminal calling himself the Joker.

== Publication history ==
=== Development ===
In an effort to resolve continuity errors in the DC Universe, Marv Wolfman and George Pérez produced the 12-issue limited series Crisis on Infinite Earths. Wolfman's plans for the DC Universe after Crisis on Infinite Earths included relaunching every DC comic with a new first issue.

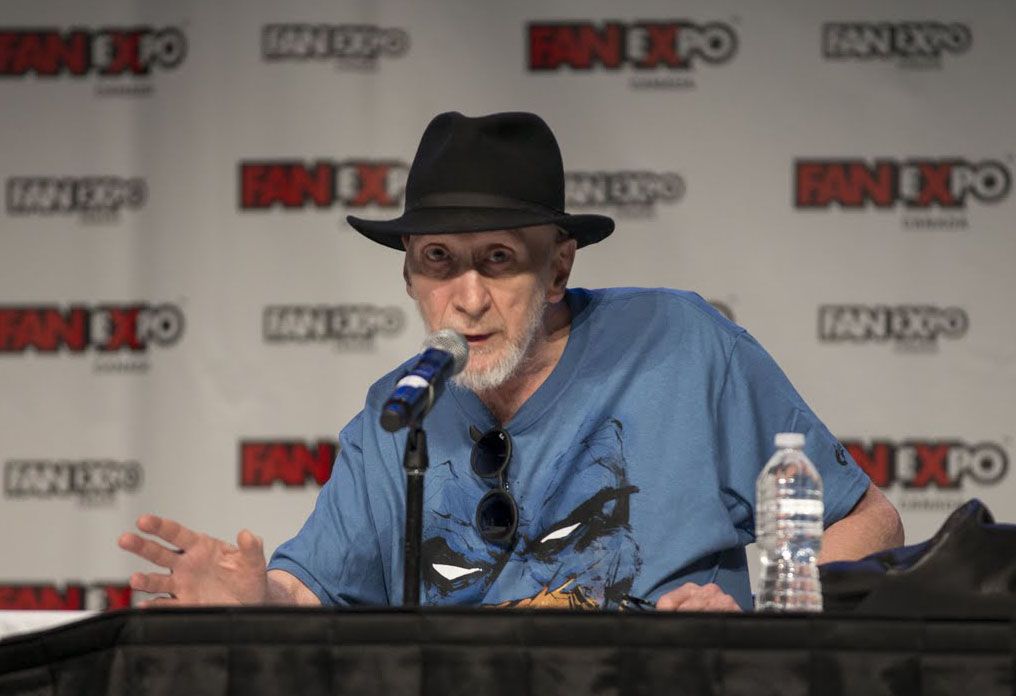
Frank Miller, the author of Year One, at the Fan Expo 2016 in Toronto, Canada

The contract Frank Miller signed to produce The Dark Knight Returns (1986) also required him to write a revamped Batman origin story. "Year One" was originally conceived as a graphic novel. Dennis O'Neil, who had been asked to edit several issues of Batman, was friends with Miller and learned of the story. Reflecting on poor sales of Batman, O'Neil caught Miller one day while on a walk in Los Angeles and convinced him and David Mazzucchelli to serialize the story in the ongoing series. Miller was initially reluctant; he felt this would be hard because he had to ensure the story stayed canonical to the DC Universe, something he did not have to worry about when writing Dark Knight Returns. In addition, Miller's pacing would have to be altered because of ongoing series' relatively small page counts. O'Neil reasoned that Crisis on Infinite Earths had completely remade the DC Universe, so Miller would be able to have the same creative freedom that Dark Knight Returns provided. He also reassured Miller that he and Mazzucchelli "weren't going to lose anything" by serializing it.

Miller has said he kept Bob Kane and Bill Finger's basic story for "Year One" but expanded it. In writing the story, Miller looked for parts of Batman's origin that were never explored. He left the core elements, such as the murder of Bruce's parents, intact, but reduced them to brief flashbacks. Bruce's globe-trotting adventures were removed, as Miller found them uninteresting. Rather than portraying Batman as a larger-than-life icon as he had in The Dark Knight Returns, Miller chose to characterize Batman in "Year One" as an average, inexperienced man trying to make a change in society because Miller believed a superhero is least interesting when most effective. Examples of this include Batman underestimating his opponents, getting shot by police, and his costume being too big. The story's violence was kept street-level and gritty, emphasizing noir and realism.

=== Artwork ===
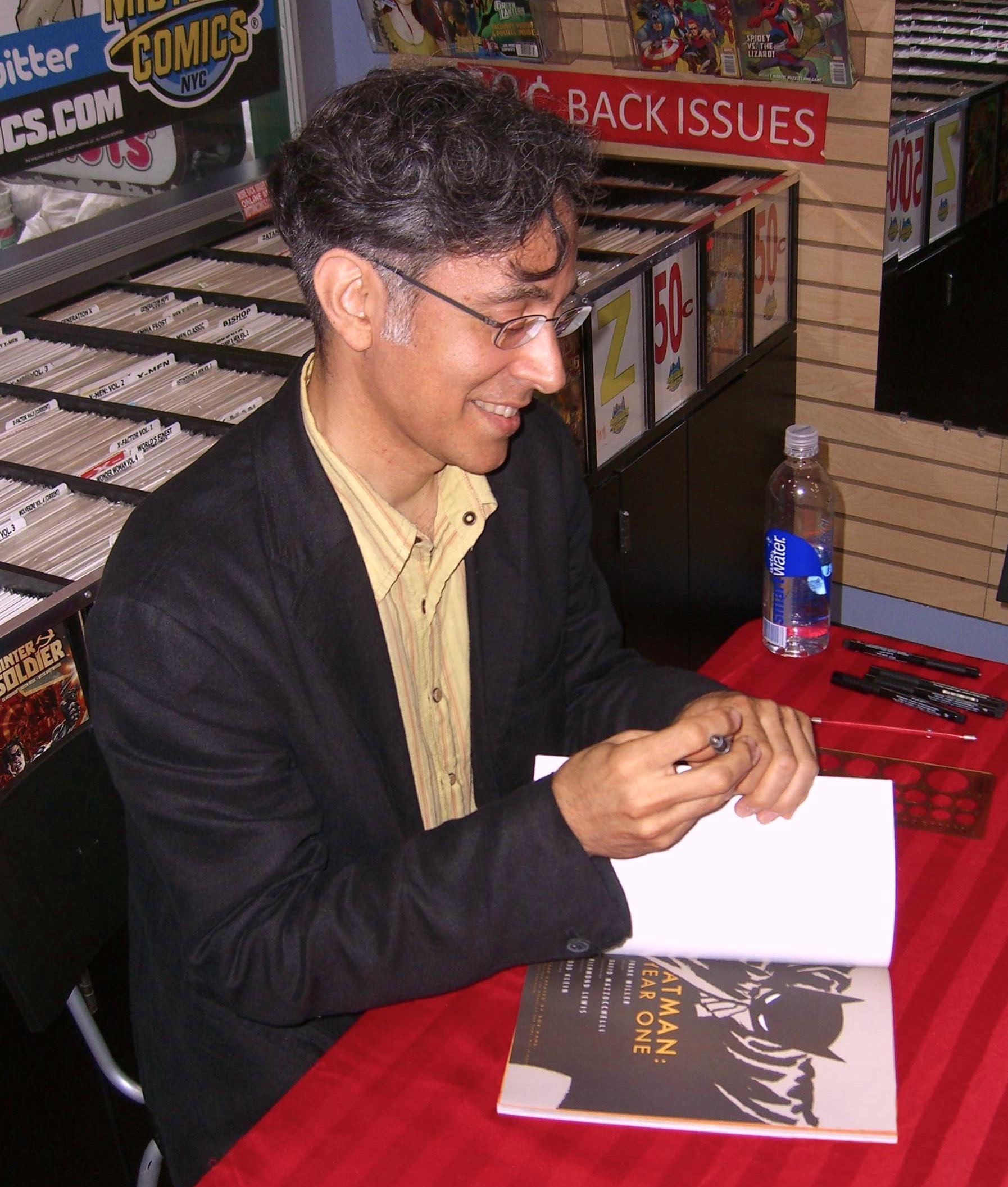
David Mazzucchelli autographing a copy of the 2005 deluxe edition trade paperback in 2012

For "Year One", Miller wrote the story and the script, and Mazzucchelli illustrated, Mazzucchelli's wife Richmond Lewis was in charge of coloring, Todd Klein was the story's letterer, and O'Neil edited.

In illustrating, Mazzucchelli sought to make "Year One" look grimy, dark, and muted. His interpretation of Gotham City was designed to symbolize corruption, featuring muddy colors that gave the impression of the city being dirty and needing a hero, so Mazzucchelli took on "Year One" with a more grounded and darker approach. Mazzucchelli envisioned "Year One" as one full story published in graphic novel. He specifically opted to use the process color paper that was used in Miller's Dark Knight Returns as printing paper rather than the usual newsprint paper used in most Batman titles because this paper material is designed to print lots of colors, more than what newsprint was capable of. There was a sudden change to what Mazzucchelli initially had planned out when O'Neil convinced him to serialize the story into the monthly issues run and retain newsprint as the printing paper. In 1988, "Year One" was published in a collected edition. DC gave Mazzucchelli the approval of using the process color paper as printing paper. With many sets of color available from the color hue, Lewis recolored the entire story in order to match the visuals printed on the paper.

Mazzucchelli: There's a big difference coloring for full process instead of newsprint. Although you have a wide range of colors available in regular comics, the paper can only take so many different colors before they start to look the same. The colors have to be pretty bold for the reader to differentiate between characters and objects.
Lewis: I think newsprint has a lot of possibilites that haven't been explored yet, but of course with process color you have a lot more to work with. The trick is in trying to control it, to keep to the simplicity of newsprint color while using the fuller range available in process ... but only where it's needed.

=== Publication ===
In accordance with Wolfman's plans, O'Neil initially saw "Year One" as the start of the second volume of Batman and expected the first part to be its first issue. However, Miller rejected this idea. He explained: "I don't need to slash through continuity with a sharp blade as I thought. Doing The Dark Knight Returns has shown me there's been enough good material... I didn't feel that fleshing out an unknown part of Batman's history justified wiping out 50 years of [adventures]." Thus, the four "Year One" issues bear no continuity to past issues of Batman.

Title	Issue	Cover date
"Chapter One: Who I Am – How I Come to Be"	Batman #404	February 1987
"Chapter Two: War Is Declared"	Batman #405	March 1987
"Chapter Three: Black Dawn"	Batman #406	April 1987
"Chapter Four: Friend in Need"	Batman #407	May 1987

=== Collected editions ===
Following the completion of the 404–407 monthly issues run, "Year One" received several reprints over the years: collected editions in hardcover and trade paperbacks, several deluxe editions in hardcover and paperback format, an Absolute Edition, and an Artist's Edition published by IDW Publishing.

In 1988, "Year One" collected editions were published in hardcover (ISBN 0930289323) and trade paperback (ISBN 0930289331). Both Warner Books (ISBN 0446389234) and Titan Books (ISBN 1852860774) also published trade paperbacks in 1988.

In 1989, Longmeadow Press published The Complete Frank Miller Batman (ISBN 068140969X), collecting "Year One", Wanted: Santa Claus - Dead or Alive!, and The Dark Knight Returns.

In April 2005, DC released the "Deluxe Edition" of "Year One" in hardcover (ISBN 1401206905) to coincide with the release of Batman Begins. This edition reuses the printing paper from the 1988 collected edition with Mazzucchelli supplying the promotional and unseen Batman art, Lewis' color samples, some of the original penciled artwork, and some pages of the original script as bonus materials. The cover was designed by Mazzucchelli and graphic designer Chip Kidd. The trade paperback (ISBN 1401207529) was published in February 2007.

The hardcover deluxe edition (ISBN 1401233422) was re-released in March 2012. Mazzucchelli clarified that DC never contacted him to design this edition. Having been sent a copy of the book by DC, Mazzucchelli was unhappy with the quality.

DC just sent me this book last week, and I really hope people don't buy it. I didn't even know they were making it, and I don't understand why they thought it was necessary — several years ago, DC asked me if I'd help put together a deluxe edition of Batman: Year One, and Dale Crain and I worked for months to try to make a definitive version. Now whoever's in charge has thrown all that work in the garbage. First, they redesigned the cover, and recolored my artwork — probably to look more like their little DVD that came out last year; second, they printed the book on shiny paper, which was never a part of the original design, all the way back to the first hardcover in 1988; third — and worst — they printed the color from corrupted, out-of-focus digital files, completely obscuring all of Richmond's hand-painted work. Anybody who's already paid for this should send it back to DC and demand a refund.

— Mazzucchelli criticizing the 2012 Deluxe Edition

In November 2014, to celebrate Batman's 75th anniversary, DC released a sample of "Year One" as a part of its DC Comics Essentials line of promotional comics.

In 2015, DC released a hardcover (ISBN 1401260047) of "Year One" which included its 2011 animated film adaptation on both DVD and Blu-ray.

In November 2016, DC released a 288-page Absolute Edition of "Year One" (ISBN 1401243797). This edition comes in a slipcase with two hardcover books. Book One features a whole new scanning from the original artworks by Mazzucchelli and remastered coloring by Lewis, while Book Two features scanning pages directly from the physical copies of the 404-407 monthly issues. Over 60 pages of bonus materials are also included, including Miller's complete scripts in Book Two.

In September 2017, the hardcover deluxe edition (ISBN 1401272940) was re-released again, this time with the same printing paper and coloring as Book One of the 2016 Absolute Edition.

In March 2022, to coincide with the release of The Batman, DC released The Batman Box Set (ISBN 1779514298), collecting trade paperbacks of "Year One", The Long Halloween, and Ego and Other Tails in a slipcase with art by Jim Lee. Director Matt Reeves cited the three graphic novels as the major influences for the film.

In August 2024, IDW Publishing published the Artist's Edition (ISBN 9798887240039) of "Year One" in a 144-page hardcover. Mazzucchelli personally supplied the artworks for scanning with Chip Kidd serving as the designer of the book. The 250 copies limited edition (ISBN 9798887241975) was exclusively available only for pre-ordering on the IDW's official website; this version includes a slipcase, a variant design of the front cover, and Mazzucchelli's personal signature printed in an interior page.

Title	Material collected	Format	Publisher	Region	Released dates	ISBN
Batman Year One	Batman #404-407	HC	DC Comics	US	Jan 1988	0930289323
Batman Year One	Batman #404-407	TPB	DC Comics	US	Oct 1988	0930289331
Batman Year One	Batman #404-407	TPB	Warner Books	US	Aug 1988	0446389234
Batman Year One	Batman #404-407	TPB	Titan Books	UK	1988	1852860774
Batman Year One: Deluxe Edition	Batman #404-407	HC	DC Comics	US	Apr 2005	1401206905
Batman Year One: Deluxe Edition	Batman #404-407	TPB	DC Comics	US	Feb 2007	1401207529
Batman Year One: Deluxe Edition	Batman #404-407	HC	DC Comics	US	Mar 2012	1401233422
Absolute Batman Year One	Batman #404-407	HC	DC Comics	US	Nov 2016	1401243797
Batman Year One: The Deluxe Edition	Batman #404-407	HC	DC Comics	US	Sep 2017	1401272940
David Mazzucchelli's Batman Year One Artist's Edition	Batman #404-407	HC	IDW Publishing	US	Aug 2024	Standard edition: 9798887240039
David Mazzucchelli's Batman Year One Artist's Edition	Batman #404-407	HC	IDW Publishing	US	Aug 2024	Limited edition: 9798887241975

== Reception ==
=== Popularity ===
DC's post-Crisis on Infinite Earths revamp was a major success, raising sales 22% in the first year, and DC beat Marvel in direct market sales for the first time in August and September 1987. The four "Year One" issues were no exception to this. Two years before the relaunch, Batman had all-time low sales of 75,000 copies per month; "Year One" sold an average of 193,000 copies an issue, numbers not seen since the early 1970s. Despite this, it did not outsell other books like Uncanny X-Men, and the collected edition sold well but never matched the sales of The Dark Knight Returns. The story, with the noir-inspired narrative and ultra-violent tone, quickly caught the attention of readers. The Los Angeles Times wrote that "Year One" offered an interesting and entertaining update to the origin of Batman.

=== Critical response ===
"Year One"'s characterization of Batman and Gordon has been praised. Hilary Goldstein (IGN) compared their journey to friendship to the plot of the film Serpico; they found that the two characters' respective story arcs—with Gordon's "illustrat[ing] the corruption in Gotham" and Batman's detailing "the transformation from man to myth"—offered an exploration of Batman's world like no other. Glenn Matchett (ComicsVerse) wrote that, unlike The Dark Knight Returns, Batman in Year One is more vulnerable and inexperienced, which made the story more memorable. Nick Roberts (Geek Syndicate) thought the characters seemed believable, and comics historian Matthew K. Manning called the characterization realistic and grounded.

The story's depiction of Gotham and darker, realistic, mature and grittier tone and direction, compared to other contemporary Batman comics at the time, has also been acclaimed. Journalist James Lovegrove described "Year One" as a "noir-inflected pulp tale of vigilantism and integrity, focused on a good man doing the right thing in a dirty world" and noted the brutality of the fight sequences. Jason Serafino (Complex) wrote that by ignoring many of Batman's trademark gadgets and villains and focusing in the core essentials of the titular character, Miller managed to present Batman in a relatable and thrilling way, which felt both fresh, unique and reinvigorating, while still being faithful to the spirit of the character. Goldstein found every moment memorable, writing "Miller does not waste a single panel" in presenting a gritty and dark story. Matchett agreed; he offered particular praise for the scenes depicting Batman clashing with the police, calling them the moment Batman began to become a legend.

Mazzucchelli's art was noted as a standout by many, praising the minimalistic, noir-influenced and realistic art-work.

== Continuity ==
Before The New 52 continuity reboot in 2011, "Batman: Year One" existed in the mainstream DC continuity, and in the same continuity as the other storylines in Miller's "Dark Knight Universe", consisting of The Dark Knight Returns, its sequels The Dark Knight Strikes Again, The Dark Knight III: The Master Race, The Dark Knight Returns: The Last Crusade, Spawn/Batman, All Star Batman and Robin the Boy Wonder, and Dark Knight Returns: The Golden Child. Following The New 52 reboot, "Zero Year" replaced "Year One" as the official origin for Batman and "Year One" was relegated to the continuity of the other Miller storylines. Elements of "Year One" were gradually returned to the mainstream DC continuity following the DC Rebirth initiative.

After Crisis on Infinite Earths, DC rebooted many of its titles. "Year One" was followed by "Batman: Year Two", but the 1994 Zero Hour: Crisis in Time crossover erased "Year Two" from continuity. In another continuity re-arrangement, "Catwoman: Year One" (Catwoman Annual #2, 1995) posited that Selina Kyle had not actually been a prostitute, but, rather, a thief posing as one to commit crimes.

Launched in 1989, following the success of the film Batman, the title Batman: Legends of the Dark Knight examines crime-fighting exploits primarily, not exclusively, from the first four to five years of Batman's career. This title rotated in creative teams and time placement, but several stories directly relate to the events of "Year One", especially the first arc "Batman: Shaman". In 1996 and 1999, Jeph Loeb and Tim Sale created Batman: The Long Halloween and Batman: Dark Victory, two 13-issue maxiseries that recount Batman's early years as a crime-fighter following the events of Miller's original story and retold the origins of Two-Face and Dick Grayson. The "Year One" story was continued in the 2005 graphic novel Batman: The Man Who Laughs, following up on Gordon informing Batman about the Joker, and thus recounting their first official encounter. Two other stories, Batman and the Monster Men and Batman and the Mad Monk tie into the same time period of Batman's career, filling in the gap between "Year One" and The Man Who Laughs. The comics Robin: Year One and Batgirl: Year One describe his sidekicks' origin stories.

== Sequels ==
Two sequels, titled "Batman: Year Two" and "Batman: Year Three", were released in 1987 and 1989.

== Adaptations ==
=== Film ===
- Joel Schumacher's Batman Forever, although set during another timespan, adopts some elements directly from the graphic novel. Schumacher claims he originally had in mind an adaptation of Miller's "Batman: Year One". The studio rejected the idea as they wanted a sequel, not a prequel, though Schumacher was able to include brief events in Batman's past.
- The DC Animated Universe film Batman: Mask of the Phantasm adopted elements of the storyline, depicting flashbacks of how Bruce Wayne became Batman and also combines it with elements of "Batman: Year Two", showing Batman's personal connection with original character Phantasm inspired by the Reaper, another character in the comics with a connection to Batman.
- After the critical failure of Batman & Robin, several attempts were made to reboot the Batman film franchise with an adaptation of "Year One". Joss Whedon and Joel Schumacher both pitched their own takes. In 2000, Warner Bros. hired Darren Aronofsky to write and direct Batman: Year One. The film was to be written by Miller, who finished an early draft of the script. The script, however, was a loose adaptation, as it kept most of the themes and elements from the graphic novel but shunned other conventions that were otherwise integral to the character. It was shelved by the studio in 2001, after an individual who claimed to have read Miller's script published a negative review on Ain't It Cool News. In 2016, Miller explained that the film was canceled because of creative differences between him, Aronofsky, and Warner Bros:

"It was the first time I worked on a Batman project with somebody whose vision of Batman was darker than mine. My Batman was too nice for him. We would argue about it, and I'd say, "Batman wouldn't do that, he wouldn't torture anybody" and so on. We hashed out a screenplay, and we were wonderfully compensated, but then Warner Bros. read it and said, "We don't want to make this movie." The executive wanted to do a Batman he could take his kids to."

- In 2005, Christopher Nolan began his series with the reboot film Batman Begins, which draws inspiration from "Year One" and other stories. Batman Begins and its sequel The Dark Knight are set during the same timespan and adopt several elements directly from the graphic novel. Major characters like Gillian B. Loeb, Arnold Flass, and Carmine Falcone are featured prominently in Batman Begins. Film critic Michael Dodd argued that with each major motion picture focused on the Dark Knight's origins, the odes and references to the "Year One" comic increased. Comparing Mask of the Phantasm with Batman Begins he noted that "...Mask of the Phantasm was a Batman story with ‘Year One’ elements, while Batman Begins was a ‘Year One’ story with added features". The film's end scene, with Gordon revealing the Joker's arrival in Gotham, mirrors the end of "Year One".
- In the animated film The Batman vs. Dracula, during Bruce Wayne's nightmare, following his first encounter with Dracula, there are moments who are directly lifted from "Year One", including his parents murder and a bat crashing in his window.
- In 2011, an animated adaptation was released as a DC Universe Animated Original Movie. It was produced by Bruce Timm, co-directed by Lauren Montgomery and Sam Liu. It features the voices of Benjamin McKenzie as Bruce Wayne/Batman, Bryan Cranston as James "Jim" Gordon, Eliza Dushku as Selina Kyle/Catwoman, Katee Sackhoff as Sarah Essen, Jon Polito as Commissioner Loeb, and Alex Rocco as Carmine 'The Roman' Falcone. The movie premiered at Comic-Con, with a Catwoman short shown in October.
- Director Matt Reeves cited "Year One" as one of the inspirations for The Batman, with Robert Pattinson portraying a younger Bruce Wayne who is in his second year as a crime-fighter. Similar to "Year One", Carmine Falcone is scratched in his right cheek by Catwoman when she assaults his headquarters.

=== Television ===
The second half of the fourth season of the Batman-based television series Gotham is inspired by "Batman: Year One".

=== Video games ===
- The "Year One" batsuit was available as one of the DLC skins for Batman: Arkham City.
- While not a direct adaptation, the video game Batman: Arkham Origins takes some inspiration from "Year One" and features a younger, less-experienced Batman in his second year of crimefighting. Set eight years before Batman: Arkham Asylum, the prequel follows Batman encountering eight of the world's greatest assassins as they attempt to claim Black Mask's $50-million bounty on him, all while being hunted by the Gotham City Police Department for his vigilantism.

=== Audio ===
"Year One" was adapted as the first four episode of DC High Volume: Batman, a weekly scripted podcast which adapts seminal Batman comics from across the years. The cast includes Jason Spisak as Batman, Jay Paulson as Jim Gordon, Reba Buhr as Selina Kyle, Adam O'Byrne as Harvey Dent, Mike Starr as Carmine Falcone, and Simon Vance as Alfred Pennyworth.
