= Commissioner Gordon =

DC Comics character

- Commissioner Jim Gordon on the cover of Detective Comics #25 (November 2013). Art by Lee Bermejo.

Publication information
- Publisher: DC Comics
- First appearance: Detective Comics #27 (May 1939); As Batman: Divergence #1 (June 2015)
- Created by: Bill Finger (writer); Bob Kane (artist)

In-story information
- Full name: James W. Gordon
- Species: Human
- Team affiliations: Gotham City Police Department; United States Marine Corps; Secret Six
- Supporting character of: Batman; Robin; Barbara Gordon
- Notable aliases: Jim (nickname); Commissioner Gordon (title); Batman (2015–2016)
- Abilities: Skilled marksman and hand-to-hand combatant; Master tactician, strategist, and field commander; Police training; Criminology training; Expert detective

Commissioner James W. "Jim" Gordon Sr. is a character appearing in American comic books published by DC Comics, most commonly in association with the superhero Batman. Created by Bill Finger and Bob Kane as an ally of Batman, the character was introduced in the first panel of "The Case of the Chemical Syndicate" (May 1939), Batman's debut story, making him the first Batman supporting character.

As the police commissioner of Gotham City, Gordon shares Batman's deep commitment to ridding the city of crime. The character is typically portrayed as having full trust in Batman and is even somewhat dependent on him. In many modern stories, he is somewhat skeptical of Batman's vigilante methods, but nevertheless believes that Gotham needs him. The two have a mutual respect and tacit friendship. Gordon is the biological or adoptive father (depending on the continuity) of Barbara Gordon, the second Batgirl and the information broker Oracle. Jim Gordon also has a biological son, James Gordon Jr., a psychopathic serial killer who first appeared in Batman: Year One (as an infant).

One of Batman's most notable and enduring allies, Gordon has appeared in various forms of non-comics media; he has been voiced in animation and video games by Bob Hastings, Bryan Cranston, Jonathan Banks, and Christopher Meloni among others, and has been portrayed in live-action by Lyle Talbot in the Batman and Robin 1949 serial, Neil Hamilton in the 1960s Batman show and film, Pat Hingle in the Tim Burton/Joel Schumacher Batman film series, Gary Oldman in The Dark Knight Trilogy, Ben McKenzie in Gotham as the main protagonist, J. K. Simmons in the DC Extended Universe (DCEU) film Justice League and its director's cut, and Jeffrey Wright in The Batman. In 2011, Jim Gordon was ranked 19th in IGN's "Top 100 Comic Book Heroes".

== Publication history ==
Created by Bill Finger and Bob Kane, Gordon debuted in the first panel of “The Case of the Chemical Syndicate” in Detective Comics #27 (May 1939), in which he is referred to simply as Commissioner Gordon. The character's name was taken from the earlier pulp character Commissioner James W. "Wildcat" Gordon, also known as "The Whisperer", created in 1936 by Henry Ralston, John Nanovic, and Lawrence Donovan for Street & Smith.

The post-Crisis version of the character is introduced in the 1987 storyline Batman: Year One, written by Frank Miller.

As part of DC's "One Year Later", Gordon is once again Gotham's police commissioner.

In September 2011, The New 52 rebooted DC's continuity. In this new timeline, Jim Gordon is the commissioner of the GCPD as well as a former Marine. He is married to Barbara Kean, with Barbara Gordon (a.k.a. Batgirl) their biological daughter.

Jim Gordon as he appears in Batman (vol. 3) #3 (July 2016). Art by David Finch.

In June 2016, the DC Rebirth event relaunched DC Comics' entire line of comic book titles, in which Jim Gordon has a continued role in Detective Comics and the third volume of Batman. In December 2017, DC Comics ended the Rebirth branding, opting to include everything under a larger DC Universe banner and naming, and Gordon continues to be featured in Detective Comics and the third volume of Batman.

== Fictional character biography ==
=== Pre-Crisis ===
==== Early law enforcement ====
Early in his career, Gordon kills two robbers in self-defence without realising that their young son is watching. Traumatised by his parents' deaths, the boy dedicates his life to taking revenge upon Gordon and other representatives of the law.

==== Emergence of Batman ====
When Batman begins operating in Gotham, Gordon initially resents his interference in police affairs. Although Batman fights crime, his disregard for ordinary police procedure causes tension between them, while his success in solving cases and apprehending criminals embarrasses the police by comparison. Gordon eventually recognises that Batman's abilities and resources can assist the department.

Although Gordon regularly socialises with Bruce Wayne, his first face-to-face meeting with Batman does not occur until Batman approaches him to propose cooperation. Batman persuades Gordon that they can protect Gotham more effectively by cooperating. Gordon accepts the proposal and begins sharing information with him during investigations. He subsequently deputises Batman and permits him to work as an agent of the law, although Batman continues to operate independently and conceals his civilian identity.

As their partnership develops, the Bat-Signal is installed on the roof of police headquarters, allowing Gordon and the department to summon Batman when his assistance is required. Gordon becomes Batman's principal contact within the Gotham City Police Department and regularly consults him during major investigations. Despite their close professional relationship, Batman continues to withhold his secret identity from Gordon.

==== The Wrath ====
Twenty-five years after Gordon kills the two robbers, their son returns to Gotham as the masked criminal known as the Wrath. Using methods and equipment resembling Batman's, the Wrath targets Gordon and attempts to murder him on the anniversary of his parents' deaths.

==== Daughter's vigilantism ====
Gordon's daughter Barbara Gordon later creates the identity of Batgirl after intervening in an attempted kidnapping while attending a masquerade ball. She begins fighting crime independently and initially conceals her activities from both Gordon and Batman.

Barbara later decides to reveal her identity to Gordon before abandoning her activities as Batgirl to seek election to the United States Congress. Gordon tells her that he had already deduced her secret and had remained silent because he believed that she would eventually disclose it herself. Barbara subsequently wins election to Congress and later resumes operating as Batgirl.

=== Post-Crisis ===
==== Early career in Gotham ====
After serving in the United States Marine Corps, James Gordon starts his law enforcement career in Gotham. As a young cop, he shoots and kills a corrupt cop and his wife in self-defense in front of their son. Gordon's transfer to Chicago is arranged by Captain Gillian Loeb, in an attempt to keep himself and his fellow corrupt cops from being exposed. Loeb threatens the child's life in order to force Gordon to comply with the transfer.

==== Chicago ====
During Gordon's tenure in Chicago, he struggles with his wife over conceiving a child while taking night classes in criminology. He becomes a minor celebrity after a foiling a late-night robbery attempt. When he decides to investigate a corrupt fellow officer, however, the officer and his cronies assault him, and the police department discredits him in order to cover up the scandal. Gordon uncovers evidence of rigging in the city council election and brings down two of his fellow officers, which leads to his commander transferring him to Gotham.

==== Return to Gotham ====
Gordon is transferred back to Gotham City after spending more than 15 years in Chicago, discovering his wife is pregnant with his son shortly after. A man of integrity, Gordon finds that Batman is his only ally against the corrupt administration, which is in league with mob boss Carmine Falcone. Gordon's relationship with Batman is kept out of the public eye whenever possible. He retaliates against an intimidation attempt by corrupt fellow officers with equal violence. He has an extramarital affair with a fellow detective, Sarah Essen. Gordon breaks off their affair out of guilt. Falcone sends his nephew Johnny Viti to kidnap Gordon's wife and son; Batman saves them, however, and helps Gordon expose police commissioner Gillian B. Loeb's corruption. After Loeb resigns, Gordon is promoted to captain.

While still a lieutenant, Gordon convinces Loeb's successor to implement the Bat-Signal as a means to contact Batman and also to frighten criminals. The first Robin, Dick Grayson, becomes Batman's sidekick. Gordon initially disapproves of Batman recruiting a child to fight dangerous criminals, but grows to not only accept the boy but trust him as much as he does Batman.

==== Police Commissioner ====
Gordon quickly rises to the rank of commissioner after he and Batman weed out corruption within the department. After the death of his brother and sister-in-law, he adopts his niece, Barbara. Soon after he adopts Barbara, he divorces his wife, who returned to Chicago with their son James Gordon Jr., while he retains custody of Barbara, who eventually becomes Batgirl. Gordon quickly deduces the heroine's true identity, and attempts to confront her about it, going so far as to search her bedroom for proof. However, he is partially dissuaded from this belief, when Batman has Robin dress up as Batgirl while Barbara is on the roof with her father. Gordon continues to believe his daughter is indeed Batgirl, but does not confront her about it.

==== Kidnapping by Joker ====
The Joker kidnaps Gordon after shooting and paralyzing Barbara. He then cages Gordon in an abandoned amusement park and forces him to look at photos of a wounded Barbara in an effort to drive him insane, thus proving to Batman that even seemingly normal people can lose their minds after having "one bad day". Batman eventually apprehends the Joker and rescues Gordon. Despite the intense trauma he has endured, Gordon's sanity and ethical code are intact; he insists that Batman apprehend the Joker without harming him in order to "show him that our way works".

==== Second marriage ====
Soon after Sarah Essen returns to Gordon's life, they rekindle their romance and get engaged. However, Essen cannot comprehend why Gordon needs Batman so much, which occasionally puts a strain on their relationship. Later, Gordon suffers a heart attack; his chain-smoking over the years has weakened his heart.

Shortly before their planned wedding, Arnold Flass (Gordon's former partner) beats Gordon and kidnaps James Jr. for ransom in exchange for letting a corrupt judge go free. Batman saves James Jr., while Gordon, Essen, Flass, and the judge are trapped and must work together to escape.

After Bane breaks Batman's back, Jean-Paul Valley and Dick Grayson assume the role for a brief period and do not tell Gordon about the switch. Gordon is removed from his post as commissioner and replaced by his own wife, due partly to his own disinclination to trust Batman.

==== Earthquake ====
During the Cataclysm storyline, Gotham is devastated by an earthquake and isolated from outside assistance. Inside Gotham, Gordon struggles to maintain order in the midst of a crime wave. Batman is mysteriously absent for the initial three months, and Gordon feels betrayed. He forges an uneasy alliance with Two-Face, but the partnership does not last; Two-Face kidnaps Gordon, putting him on trial for breaking their "legally binding" alliance. Gordon escapes, however, and later meets with Batman once again. In this confrontation, Gordon berates Batman for letting Gotham "fall into ruin". Batman offers to prove his trust by revealing his secret identity, but Gordon refuses to look when Batman removes his mask. Eventually, the two repair their friendship.

After the earthquake, the Joker kills Sarah Essen. An enraged Gordon barely restrains himself from killing Joker, shooting the madman in the knee instead. Not long afterward, Gordon is shot by a criminal seeking revenge for a previous arrest. Though seriously injured, he survives, and eventually makes a full recovery.

==== Retirement ====
Gordon retires from the police force after having served for more than 20 years. Despite being retired, Gordon often finds himself drawn to a series of life-and-death circumstances, such as the Joker sending him flowers during Last Laugh, or being contacted by the temporarily reformed Harvey Dent to stop Batman from killing the Joker, to being kidnapped by Francis Sullivan during the Made of Wood storyline. After the attack by Sullivan, Batman gives Gordon an encrypted cellphone, the so-called Batphone, in case he needs to contact him, which also carries a transmitter in case of trouble. Commissioner Michael Akins has taken his position, with many officers expressing reluctance to follow him out of loyalty to Gordon.

After Barbara requires surgery to counter the life-threatening effects of the Brainiac virus, Gordon visits her in Metropolis. She reveals to him her current role as Oracle, as well as her past as Batgirl. Gordon admits that he knew of her identity as Batgirl, but is pleasantly surprised to know of her second identity as Oracle.

==== Defending against the undead ====
While mourning the death of Batman, Gordon and his daughter are attacked by several of Batman's enemies, who have been resurrected as members of the Black Lantern Corps. They are rescued by the current Batman, Robin, Red Robin, and Deadman, but are later attacked by Batman and Red Robin's parents, the reanimated Flying Graysons, and Tim Drake's parents.

==== Arrest and imprisonment ====
Gordon is tricked into shooting at an unarmed suspect in an underground train station, resulting in a train derailing and Gordon being arrested. While incarcerated in Blackgate Penitentiary, Gordon is visited by his son, who makes arrangements to leave his father's cell open and provide him with an opportunity to escape Blackgate. Gordon decides to remain in prison, concluding that Gotham is still worth saving and simply musing that he may just be getting old and made a mistake. Gordon is released as the final assault on Gotham begins, proceeding to rally all of Gotham to stand up and take back their city to aid Batman for everything he has ever done for them.

==== Becoming Batman ====
Following Bruce Wayne's apparent death in a battle with the Joker, Gordon takes up the mantle of Batman using a mecha-style suit to fight crime in Gotham City. Gordon later meets the de-powered Superman when Clark comes to Gotham to investigate evidence that the weapons being used against him were created in Gotham, but their initial meeting results in a fight as Superman does not believe that Gordon is the new Batman and Gordon doubts Superman due to his working with Luthor. Although Gordon doubts Superman's abilities due to his powerless state, he eventually works with Superman to stop Vandal Savage stealing an artificial sun created in Gotham to use as part of his latest plan, their alliance helping Gordon recognize Superman's continued merits as a hero while Superman in turn acknowledges that the new Batman gets the job done. Gordon later works with the Justice League to investigate the death of a large monster, the heroes noting after the case has concluded that Batman's high opinion of Gordon's abilities as a detective were well-founded. Despite Gordon's best efforts, political issues in the department result in Mr. Bloom destroying his armor and mounting a massive assault on Gotham after seriously injuring Gordon, prompting the amnesic Bruce Wayne to try and reclaim his role as Batman. The crisis concludes with Bloom defeated by the returned Batman using some of Gordon's equipment while working with his old ally. The return of the true Batman prompts the GCPD to shut down the program and restore Gordon to his role as commissioner.

==== Son's death ====
Gordon seeks help from his estranged son James Jr. to work alongside him and Batman to take down the doppleganger known as The Grim Knight. Gordon is kidnapped by The Grim Knight since The Batman Who Laughs seeks to recruit him as an ally, only to rebuke his offer. He is later able to escape. Learning that Batman has been infected by the Batman Who Laughs, Gordon and James are tasked to protect the Batcave from the Grim Knight, who is on his way. With each one donning a Batsuit, they briefly get the jump on the Grim Knight. However, the Grim Knight uses Gordon's own words against him and seemingly sway James Jr. to his side. As he is strangled by the dark Batman, Gordon notices a vial of toxin poured into the water and the Grim Knight begins to drown him in the water; taking several gulps of the poisoned water, Gordon is saved by James stabbing the Grim Knight repeatedly in the shoulder and back. Gordon consoles his son and affirms that he loves him. However, due to being subjected to a small dosage of the toxin, Gordon becomes corrupted. Batman is able to get help from Superman in capturing Gordon and the other infected heroes until a cure can be found.

James Jr. develops a split-personality disorder, murdering redheads and dressing them up as Batgirl out of jealousy. Finding out what he did, he commits suicide by jumping off of a lighthouse. Blaming Batgirl for James' death, Gordon lashes out of her.

Gordon retires from public service as a result of his son's death and agrees to look for Joker on behalf of a secretive organization, with his daughter Barbara providing intelligence and communications support. He knew his daughter was Batgirl and only blamed her out of grief for his son.

== Other versions ==
=== The Dark Knight Returns ===
An alternate universe version of Jim Gordon appears in Batman: The Dark Knight Returns. This version is retired and aware of Batman's secret identity.

=== JLA: Earth 2 ===
On the Anti-Matter Earth, where the evil Crime Syndicate of America live, Commissioner Gordon's counterpart is a crime boss named Boss Gordon, an ally to Owlman. Boss Gordon is the city's leading crime boss until his empire is toppled by Batman and commissioner Thomas Wayne.

=== Batman: Gotham Noir ===
An alternate universe version of Jim Gordon appears in Batman: Gotham Noir. This version is a private detective who left the police force following a failure to solve the disappearance of a judge.

=== Batman: In Darkest Knight ===
An alternate universe version of Jim Gordon appears in Batman: In Darkest Knight, Jim Gordon is an honest cop who distrusts Green Lantern (Bruce Wayne) because of his near-limitless power. Later on, Gordon changes his mind and starts investigating, but is killed by Sinestro.

=== Vampire Batman ===
An alternate universe version of Jim Gordon appears in the Batman/Dracula trilogy. He is captured by Dracula as bait to lure Batman into a trap after Batman's allies- rogue vampires led by Dracula's former bride Tanya- sacrifice themselves to destroy Dracula's "family". With Batman having become a vampire himself, he realises that there are still vampires left in Gotham, now led by the Joker in a coordinated campaign to turn the city's crime families, Gordon and Alfred Pennyworth gathering a team of cops to stake the vampires in daylight. Ultimately, Gordon and Alfred have to ally with Two-Face and Killer Croc to stop Batman after he succumbs to his thirst for blood, Gordon noting that even if Batman is currently killing criminals the man they lost would never have killed, all parties aware that Batman will start to feed on innocents if he isn't stopped now. The story concludes with Gordon being crushed by debris from the Batcave roof after explosives are planted to destroy it, thus exposing Batman to sunlight and allowing him to die.

=== Earth-8 ===
An alternate universe version of Jim Gordon appears in Lord Havok and the Extremists. This version is a flesh-hungry zombie who is kept in line by Bat-Soldier using a large chain.

=== Flashpoint ===
An alternate universe version of Jim Gordon appears in Flashpoint event. This version is Gotham's chief of police. When Gordon locates Martha Wayne (this continuity's version of the Joker) in old Wayne Manor, he goes in without backup and ends up being killed by Wayne.

=== Earth One ===
An alternate universe version of Jim Gordon appears in Batman: Earth One. This version is a broken man who has given up on fighting corruption until the emergence of Batman. Gordon is later promoted as police captain after arresting his corrupt predecessor.

=== Batman: Damned ===
An alternate universe version of Jim Gordon appears in Batman: Damned.

=== Dark Multiverse ===
Various versions of Gordon appear in the Dark Multiverse depicted in Dark Nights: Metal:

- In the world of the Dawnbreaker, where Bruce Wayne received a Green Lantern ring after the deaths of his parents, Gordon attempts to confront the Dawnbreaker about his use of lethal force on criminals, but the Dawnbreaker kills him.
- In the world of the Batman Who Laughs, Gordon's death contributed to Batman's final confrontation with the Joker, which led to Batman being contaminated by his foe's blood and transformed into The Batman Who Laughs.
- In the world of the Grim Knight, where Batman's use of guns and lethal force led to him turning Gotham into a police state, Gordon was eventually able to determine Batman's secret identity with the aid of information from Alfred, who became unable to countenance Batman's use of lethal force on all criminals, allowing him to arrest Bruce Wayne.

=== Earth 3 ===
Following the "Infinite Frontier" event, Earth 3 was rebooted. Like the version seen in JLA: Earth 2, Jim Gordon operated as a crime boss. After his son Jimmy Jr. was killed by criminals Thomas Wayne and Martha Wayne, Boss Gordon sent his minion Harvey Bullock to kill them which also led to Harvey also killing Bruce and leaving Thomas Wayne Jr. alive. Thomas Wayne Jr. in the identity of Owlman would later learn of this motive when he captures Harvey Bullock years later.

=== Earth-89 (Batman '89) ===
In the universe where the films Batman (1989) and Batman Returns is set, it is retroactively established in the comic book miniseries Batman '89 that Pat Hingle's iteration of Gordon was the patrolman who found and comforted Bruce in the alley where his parents were murdered. He is later killed by Billy Dee Williams's Harvey Dent after the character becomes Two-Face. In the follow-up book, Echoes, his daughter Barbara becomes Captain of the GCPD and decides against prosecuting Bruce after discovering her father had learned Batman's secret identity at some point after the events of the first film but refused to disclose it.

=== Absolute Universe ===
An alternate version of James Gordon appears in Absolute Batman. This version is a former police commissioner and mayor of Gotham City. He loses support when the Party Animal cause chaos in Gotham and is later voted off in favor of Hamilton Hill.

== In other media ==
=== Television ===
==== Live-action ====
- Jim Gordon appears in Batman (1966), portrayed by Neil Hamilton.
- Jim Gordon appears in Gotham, portrayed by Ben McKenzie. This version is an idealistic rookie detective and a war veteran of the United States Army.

==== Animation ====
- Jim Gordon appears in The Batman/Superman Hour, voiced by Ted Knight.
- Jim Gordon appears in the Super Friends franchise, voiced by Danny Dark in Challenge of the Superfriends and Robert Morse in Super Powers Team: Galactic Guardians.
- Jim Gordon appears in The New Adventures of Batman, voiced by Lennie Weinrib.

Commissioner Gordon as he appeared in Batman: The Animated Series (left) and The New Batman Adventures (right).

- Jim Gordon appears in series set in the DC Animated Universe (DCAU), voiced by Bob Hastings. Following his introduction in Batman: The Animated Series and The New Batman Adventures, Gordon makes guest appearances in Superman: The Animated Series and Static Shock. Additionally, Gordon appears in a photograph depicted in the Batman Beyond episode "Black Out".
- Jim Gordon appears in The Batman (2004), voiced by Mitch Pileggi.
- Jim Gordon makes non-speaking appearances in Batman: The Brave and the Bold. Additionally, a similar character, Chancellor Gor-Zonn, appears in the episode "The Super-Batman of Planet X!", voiced by Corey Burton.
- Jim Gordon appears in the Best Friends Forever series of shorts.
- Jim Gordon appears in Teen Titans Go!, voiced by Eric Bauza.
- Jim Gordon appears in Young Justice, voiced by Corey Burton.
- Jim Gordon appears in Beware the Batman, voiced by Kurtwood Smith. This version is initially a lieutenant who distrusts Batman. In the episode "Nexus", Gordon becomes police commissioner after Commissioner Correa is killed by the League of Assassins.
- Jim Gordon makes a non-speaking cameo appearance in the Justice League Action episode "Galaxy Jest".
- Jim Gordon appears in DC Super Hero Girls (2019), voiced by Fred Tatasciore. This version is retired and lives in Metropolis.
- Jim Gordon appears in Harley Quinn, voiced by Christopher Meloni. This version is sleep-deprived, neurotic, alcoholic, and borderline psychotic due to the pressure of his work, usually having to be reined in by Batman.
- Jim Gordon appears in Batman: Caped Crusader, voiced by Eric Morgan Stuart.
- The Merry Little Batman incarnation of Jim Gordon (see below) appears in Bat-Fam, voiced again by Reid Scott.

=== Film ===
==== Live-action ====
J. K. Simmons in Justice League (2017); Jeffrey Wright as Gordon in The Batman (2022)
- Jim Gordon appears in Batman and Robin, portrayed by Lyle Talbot.
- Jim Gordon appears in Batman: The Movie, portrayed again by Neil Hamilton.
- Jim Gordon appears in the Tim Burton/Joel Schumacher Batman film series, portrayed by Pat Hingle.
- Jim Gordon appears in Christopher Nolan's Dark Knight trilogy, portrayed by Gary Oldman.
- Jim Gordon appears in Justice League, portrayed by J. K. Simmons. Simmons appeared as Gordon in the 2021 director's cut Zack Snyder's Justice League, and was set to reprise his role in Batgirl prior to its cancellation.
- Jim Gordon appears in The Batman (2022), portrayed by Jeffrey Wright.

==== Animated ====
- Jim Gordon makes a non-speaking cameo appearance in Justice League: The New Frontier.
- Jim Gordon appears in Batman: Gotham Knight, voiced by Jim Meskimen.
- Jim Gordon appears in Batman: Under the Red Hood, voiced by an uncredited Gary Cole.
- Jim Gordon appears in Batman: Year One, voiced by Bryan Cranston.
- Jim Gordon appears in Batman: The Dark Knight Returns, voiced by David Selby.
- Jim Gordon appears in Lego Batman: The Movie - DC Super Heroes Unite, voiced by Townsend Coleman.
- Jim Gordon appears in the DC Animated Movie Universe films Son of Batman, Batman: Bad Blood and Batman: Hush, voiced by Bruce Thomas.
- Jim Gordon appears in Batman: Assault on Arkham, voiced by Chris Cox.
- Jim Gordon appears in the Batman Unlimited series of films, voiced by Richard Epcar.
- Jim Gordon appears in Lego DC Comics Super Heroes: Justice League – Gotham City Breakout, voiced by Eric Bauza.
- Jim Gordon appears in Batman: The Killing Joke, voiced by Ray Wise.
- Jim Gordon appears in Batman: Return of the Caped Crusaders and Batman vs. Two-Face, voiced by Jim Ward.
- Jim Gordon appears in The Lego Batman Movie, voiced by Héctor Elizondo.
- Jim Gordon appears in Batman: Gotham by Gaslight, voiced by Scott Patterson.
- Jim Gordon makes a non-speaking illustrated cameo appearance in the end credits of Batman Ninja.
- Jim Gordon makes a non-speaking cameo appearance in Teen Titans Go! To the Movies.
- Jim Gordon appears in Batman vs. Teenage Mutant Ninja Turtles, voiced again by Jim Meskimen.
- Jim Gordon appears in Lego DC Batman: Family Matters, voiced again by Tom Kenny.
- Jim Gordon appears in Batman: Death in the Family, voiced again by Gary Cole.
- Jim Gordon appears in Batman: The Long Halloween, voiced by Billy Burke.
- Jim Gordon makes a non-speaking cameo appearance in Space Jam: A New Legacy.
- Jim Gordon appears in Batman: The Doom That Came to Gotham, voiced by John DiMaggio.
- Jim Gordon appears in Merry Little Batman, voiced by Reid Scott.
- Jim Gordon appears in Batman Ninja vs. Yakuza League, voiced by John Gremillion.
- Jim Gordon appears in Batman: Knightfall, voiced by Bruce Boxleitner.

=== Video games ===
- Jim Gordon appears in Batman: Vengeance, voiced again by Bob Hastings.
- Jim Gordon appears in Batman: Rise of Sin Tzu, voiced again by Bob Hastings.
- Jim Gordon appears in Batman: Dark Tomorrow, voiced by Ron McLarty.
- Jim Gordon appears in the Batman Begins tie-in video game, voiced by Gavin Hammon.
- Jim Gordon appears in the Batman: Arkham franchise, voiced by Tom Kane and Rick D. Wasserman in Arkham Asylum, David Kaye in Arkham City, Michael Gough in Arkham Origins, Jonathan Banks in Arkham Knight, and Mark Rolston in Arkham Shadow.
- Jim Gordon appears in DC Universe Online, voiced by Ken Webster.
- Jim Gordon appears in The Dark Knight Rises tie-in game, voiced by Oliver Wyman.
- Jim Gordon makes a non-speaking cameo appearance in Injustice: Gods Among Us.
- Jim Gordon appears in Scribblenauts Unmasked: A DC Comics Adventure.
- Jim Gordon appears in Batman: The Telltale Series and Batman: The Enemy Within, voiced by Murphy Guyer.

==== Lego series ====
- Jim Gordon appears in Lego Batman: The Videogame, voiced by Keith Ferguson.
- Jim Gordon appears in Lego Batman 2: DC Super Heroes, voiced by Townsend Coleman.
- The Dark Knight Trilogy iteration of Jim Gordon appears in Lego Batman 3: Beyond Gotham.
- Jim Gordon appears in Lego Dimensions, voiced by Steve Blum.
- Jim Gordon appears as a playable character in Lego DC Super-Villains, voiced by Tom Kane.
- Jim Gordon appears in Lego Batman: Legacy of the Dark Knight, voiced by Colin McFarlane. This version evokes the appearance of The Batman version with elements of The Dark Knight Trilogy version.

=== Miscellaneous ===
- Jim Gordon appears in the Batman OnStar commercials, portrayed by an uncredited actor.
- Following the portrayal of Gordon's heart attack, DC Comics partnered with the American Heart Association to create a public service announcement to raise awareness of the danger of tobacco smoking and how it would threaten one's health.
- Jim Gordon appears in Holy Musical B@man!, portrayed by Lauren Lopez.
- Jim Gordon appears in the Saturday Night Live segment "Commissioner Gordon Learns Batman Has No Boundaries", portrayed by Steve Buscemi.
- Jim Gordon appears in Batman Black and White, voiced by John Fitzgerald.
- Jim Gordon appears in DC Super Hero Girls (2015), voiced by Tom Kenny. This version is a forensics teacher at Super Hero High School.
- Jim Gordon appears in the Injustice: Gods Among Us prequel comic. He, Harvey Bullock, and Renee Montoya join forces with Batman's Insurgency to fight the Regime shortly after Gordon is diagnosed with terminal lung cancer. Gordon takes two of the super pills to save Barbara Gordon from Cyborg, which accelerates his cancer and ends up killing him.
