= Pax Penguina =

- Gotham episode
- Episode no.: Season 4 Episode 1
- Directed by: Danny Cannon
- Written by: John Stephens
- Cinematography by: Crescenzo Notarile
- Editing by: Barrie Wise
- Production code: T40.10001
- Original air date: September 21, 2017
- Running time: 43 minutes

Guest appearances
- Damian Young as Warden Reed; Maggie Geha as Ivy Pepper; Charlie Tahan as Jonathan Crane / Scarecrow; Michael Maize as Grady; Michael Buscemi as Merton; Larry Pine as Mayor Burke; Anthony Carrigan as Victor Zsasz

Episode chronology
← Previous "Heavydirtysoul"	Next → "The Fear Reaper"
- Gotham season 4

"Pax Penguina" is the first episode of the fourth season and 67th episode overall from the Warner Bros. series Gotham. The show is itself based on the characters created by DC Comics set in the Batman mythology. This is the first episode with the new subtitle "A Dark Knight". The episode was written by executive producer John Stephens and directed by Danny Cannon. It was first broadcast on September 21, 2017.

The episode begins three months after the season 3 finale and revolves around a period in which criminals now get "licenses" to commit crimes, provided by Cobblepot in order to earn the support of the city government and the public to reduce crime. However, a gang of criminals challenge the new licenses' policy and decide to commit heists to send a message to Cobblepot. The gang also makes use of Jonathan Crane's fear toxin. Gordon discovers the use of the gas and sets out to find Jonathan. Meanwhile, Bruce continues his vigilantism in order to prepare himself when Ra's al Ghul arrives.

The episode received positive response, who praised the new character development for some characters.

== Plot ==
The episode opens with Bruce (David Mazouz) again on the roof of a building similar to the one at the close of the season 3 finale. He hears a couple scream, and he leaps down to the alleyway. While saving a couple from a pair of thugs, Bruce, wearing the first version of the Batman mask, discovers that the thugs possess an official "License of misconduct." He walks away from the scene, not realizing Ra's al Ghul (Alexander Siddig) is watching him.

Elsewhere, a group of gunmen crash a wedding reception and begin stealing the guests' valuable objects. Zsasz (Anthony Carrigan) arrives and announces that they don't have Cobblepot's (Robin Lord Taylor) license authorization, which would allow them to commit crimes as long as they give half their haul to him. The group's leader rebuffs Zsasz, who then shoots the leader's, Merton (Michael Buscemi), finger off. Zsasz allows them to flee. As they do, a licensed group under Zsasz's control enters and resumes robbing the guests.

Cobblepot negotiates with the newly appointed Mayor Burke (Larry Pine) and police commissioner and they agree to the licensing in exchange for a percentage of the cut. Gordon (Ben McKenzie) arrives at a bar just as a thug is robbing the owner who knows him. The thug shows a license and continues the robbery, but Gordon slams him into the bar and arrests him. Bruce tells Alfred (Sean Pertwee) his intention to stop Cobblepot's crime business.

After bribing the warden, Merton and his partner Grady (Michael Maize) visit Jonathan Crane (Charlie Tahan) in Arkham Asylum. Crane is still suffering the effects of his father's fear toxin The Scarecrow (Gotham episode). Over time, Crane's mind has created a "Boogeyman Scarecrow persona" that now haunts him. Merton and Grady bribe the Warden (Damian Young) to release Jonathan, who leaves a drawing in the form of a scarecrow. They take him to his old home where he reveals the hidden fear toxins. The gang then uses the gas to do a bank heist, spraying people with the gas in order to make the heist easier.

Investigating the heist, Gordon tells Bullock (Donal Logue) that the victims' faces were coated with a substance that caused them to experience their worse fears, which is the same method Gerald Crane used. He deduces that someone must have taken the formula from Jonathan. After interrogating the Warden, they go to Grady's apartment but are ambushed by him and Merton. Merton beat Gordan and Bullock and while they are laying on the floor, he explains their plan to send a message to Cobblepot regarding the licenses, and they leave. Meanwhile, Selina (Camren Bicondova) and Tabitha (Jessica Lucas) attack a group of thugs. When returning to their apartment, Zsasz shows up, claiming that they should go to Cobblepot's club inauguration to get their licenses. Selina is interested, but Tabitha refuses and tells her to pack so they can find a new place.

Cobblepot throws a party to inaugurate his new club, the Iceberg Lounge and shows the attendees Nygma's (Cory Michael Smith) frozen body as a hall exhibition. Gordon, based on advice from Bruce, visits Cobblepot before the party and tells him that the gang does not fear him, prompting Cobblepot to set a trap to catch the gang. As the gang prepares to attack the club, they have Jonathan make more toxins and then lock him in a closet with a scarecrow. He begins to have severe hallucinations about the scarecrow who seemingly comes to life. In the GCPD, Gordon is attacked by a group of police who are loyal to Cobblepot.

In the Iceberg Lounge, during the inauguration, Bruce finds Selina on the rooftop and they discuss what happened at the hospital with Bruce apologizing for his behavior. They are interrupted by Alfred who says something is happening. As the gang entered the club's kitchens, Cobblepot and Zsasz catch them and bring then in front of the party goers to exact a public punishment. This disgusts Ivy (Maggie Geha), who cuts the power at the same time Gordan and Bullock arrive. The gang attempts to escape and spray Cobblepot with the fear toxin, making him hallucinate Nygma. The gang is subdued, but Grady manages to escape.

The next day, Bruce retrieves the list of criminals with the licenses. However, as he crosses a rooftop, he comes across a house being robbed. While leaning on the skylight, the glass cracks and he falls through into the apartment. He is then caught without the mask by the GCPD.

Grady returns to Crane's house to get more toxin from Jonathan. However, when he opens the door to the room they locked Jonathan in, he is confronted by Jonathan, who says Jonathan no longer exists. He is now dressed as "The Scarecrow" and demands to be called the Scarecrow while spraying Grady with fear gas.

== Production ==
=== Development ===
The show was officially renewed by Fox for a fourth season on May 10, 2017. Just like the second and third seasons, the fourth season will also carry a new subtitle for the first half of the season: A Dark Knight.

In June 2017, John Stephens announced that the first episode of the season would be titled "Pax Penguina" and was to be written by Stephens and directed by Danny Cannon. The title "Pax Penguina" is a play on the Latin phrase "Pax Romana", meaning "Roman peace".

=== Writing ===
Regarding Bruce's beginning of vigilantism, McKenzie explained that "We are definitely leaning into Bruce, having learned some of the skills to be a vigilante, now actually attempting it. Now, we have a long, long way to go before he can realistically be Batman, so there will be many stumbles and falls – and regressions back to being a kid at times – but Gordon will eventually become aware of what he's doing and that will bring them against each other." David Mazouz also added, "Bruce really is taking on this vigilante persona and all the things that go along with that. Whether it be creating another persona, a public persona, that's also definitely going to be a major part of Bruce's journey this year. His relationship as this other person. Batman is coming. Absolutely." Mazouz also stated that he was worried the writers could pull back some aspects from Batman, deeming it "too fast" but he was glad it didn't stop. He said that Bruce would take the "Batman persona" this season. Cannon also explained that Bruce will be seen "as the emerging threat he is." Alexander Siddig stated that his character will seek to make Bruce his heir and will "do anything he can to get his hands on him, to manipulate him into what [Ra's] wants him to be." He also claimed that the season is "a season so far of extremes."

=== Casting ===
As a concept McKenzie wished to explore, the episode brought back the actor Charlie Tahan as Jonathan Crane / Scarecrow, who portrayed the character on the first-season episodes: "The Fearsome Dr. Crane" and "The Scarecrow". McKenzie explained: "So we met his father Dr Crane in Season 1. So we've taken our time; we're gonna come back now to his son. You know, in circumstances probably not best described now, his son takes on his father's mantle and becomes the fully-realized Scarecrow. It's great. We're able to use this sort of fear toxin that Scarecrow is able to summon. We're completely unafraid — or perhaps afraid but we still persist–in expanding the universe and our capabilities."

Morena Baccarin, Erin Richards, Chris Chalk, Drew Powell and Crystal Reed appear in the episode as hallucinations of their respective characters, with Baccarin and Chalk receiving credit only, while Richards, Powell and Reed were uncredited. In August 2017, it was announced that the guest cast for the episode would include Michael Buscemi as Merton, Larry Pine as Mayor Burke, Michael Maize as Grady Harris, Charlie Tahan as Jonathan Crane, Anthony Carrigan as Victor Zsasz, Damian Young as Warden Reed and Maggie Geha as Ivy Pepper.

== Reception ==
=== Viewers ===
The episode was watched by 3.21 million viewers with a 1.0/4 share among adults aged 18 to 49. These ratings were higher than any episode of the second part of the past season and it was a 6% increase in viewership from the previous episode, which was watched by 3.03 million viewers with a 0.9/4 in the 18-49 demographics but an 18% decrease from the previous season premiere, which was watched by 3.90 million viewers with a 1.3/4 in the 18-49 demographics. With these ratings, Gotham ranked second for the night as well as for Fox behind The Orville.

The show was the 49th most watched show of the week.

=== Critical reviews ===
Professional ratings
Review scores
Source	Rating
IGN	7.8
TV Fanatic	3.5/5.0 stars
TV Overmind	4.0/5.0 stars

"A Dark Knight: Pax Penguina" received positive reviews from critics. Matt Fowler of IGN gave the episode a "good" 7.8 out of 10 and wrote in his verdict, "Gotham returned with a fun look at how much of the city's problem's could be solved with morally questionable outside-the-box thinking. It's up to the show now to convince me, basically, that Jim has a leg to stand on with regards to his objections of having a staggeringly low crime rate and a city at peace."

Nick Hogan of TV Overmind gave the episode a 4 star rating out of 5, writing "Ultimately, Gotham is off to an interesting start. The pivot to a different style has its merits, but the long term benefits will have be [sic] fleshed out. Still, I enjoyed the episode immensely, and I'm glad that one of my favorite shows is back." Sydney Bucksbaum of The Hollywood Reporter wrote, "The potential for chaos and destruction is truly terrifying. Thank goodness Jim Gordon isn't rolling over and letting Penguin run the city. If anyone can find and catch Crane, it's him. And it's interesting to note that this incarnation of the Scarecrow is much closer to the comic book version, despite it being Dr. Jonathan Crane's son and not the professor himself. Gotham is no longer just dealing in proto-villains." Dan Seitz from Uproxx wrote, "Embracing the campiness that was always at the core of the show was something of a risk for Gotham. But it's paid off, especially now that the show is full of vigilantes and frozen villains in the middle of nightclubs. As the show's realized it can be, well, Goth ham, it's loosened up and started having fun."

Vinnie Mancuso of Collider wrote, "Outside of a few rejected album reviews drunkenly sent to every music magazine in the country at 4 AM, I rarely get the chance to compare Fox's batshit Batman prequel Gotham to the music stylings of Taylor Swift. But the show's Season 4 premiere, titled 'Pax Penguina,' provided a surprisingly prescient opportunity to do just that. Much like Swift hinted at her transition from a sugar-laced pop-singer into something angrier and more prone to shop at Hot Topic by declaring the Old Taylor was dead, young Jonathan Crane announced that he, too, has officially become something darker. 'Jonathan Crane isn't here anymore,' he says at the episode's conclusion. 'It's just the Scarecrow.'" Lisa Babick of TV Fanatic gave the series a 3.5 star rating out of 5, writing "'Pax Penguina' was a bit of a rocky start to the season, but there are good storylines that show promise; Bruce's being the most of exciting of all. Will Baby Batman decide to take on Scarecrow, or will that be Jim's villain to catch? " Robert Yanis, Jr. of Screenrant wrote, "Seasons 2 and 3 may have introduced some thrilling villain origins, but aside from that, its narrative has felt jumbled and erratic. The show has long been fans' guiltiest pleasure, but Bruce's storyline this season could legitimize Gotham once and for all. For as much fun as Penguin and company are, the real reason fans tune in to a Batman prequel is to see the character's evolution. Now he has arrived: a dark knight."

Kayti Burt of Den of Geek wrote, "It might seem like I am being a little harsh on this episode, which introduced some great new plot directions for this show, but, after last season, I know this show can do better! It has raised the bar for what makes a great episode of Gotham." Laurence Mozafari of Digital Spy wrote, "Gotham season 4 has swooped onto screens, and as itty bitty Bruce Wayne continues his loooong transformation into the Batman, fans were treated to a new, acrobatic look at the young detective."
