= What the Little Bird Told Him =

- Gotham episode
- Episode no.: Season 1 Episode 12
- Directed by: Eagle Egilsson
- Written by: Ben Edlund
- Production code: 4X6662
- Original air date: January 19, 2015

Guest appearances
- David Zayas as Salvatore "Sal" Maroni; Drew Powell as Butch Gilzean; Anthony Carrigan as Victor Zsasz; Makenzie Leigh as Liza; Morena Baccarin as Dr. Leslie Thompkins; Christopher Heyerdahl as Jack Gruber; Peter Scolari as Commissioner Gillian B. Loeb; Kevin McCormick as Aaron Danzig; Adrian Martinez as Irwin; Victor Cruz as Desk Sergeant; Caroline Lagerfelt as Mrs. Kean; Richard Poe as Mr. Everette Kean; Dash Mihok as Det. Arnold Flass

Episode chronology
← Previous "Rogues' Gallery"	Next → "Welcome Back, Jim Gordon"

"What the Little Bird Told Him" is the twelfth episode of the television series Gotham. It premiered on FOX on January 19, 2015, and was written by Ben Edlund, and directed by Eagle Egilsson. In this episode, Gordon (Ben McKenzie) looks to capture a prisoner who escaped from Arkham Asylum to get his job back. Meanwhile, Falcone (John Doman) struggles to hold his empire when someone beloved to him takes an unexpected turn.

The episode was watched by 6.50 million viewers and received mixed-to-positive reviews. Critics praised Gordon's storyline but criticized the anti-climax.

== Plot ==
Jack Gruber (Christopher Heyerdahl) and Aaron Danzig (Kevin McCormick) arrive at an electronics store, testing on the owner, Irwin (Adrian Martinez). In the GCPD, Gordon (Ben McKenzie) makes a deal with Commissioner Gillian B. Loeb (Peter Scolari) to get his detective badge back if he catches Gruber in 24 hours. They arrive at the electronics store, where they find Irwin writing "I will not betray my friends" on the walls. In the GCPD, Dr. "Lee" Thompkins (Morena Baccarin) arrives, planning on working on the case.

Nygma (Cory Michael Smith) reveals Gruber is an alias and his real name is Jack Buchinsky, having bribed a guard to change his name. He gives Gordon and Bullock (Donal Logue) overshoes to avoid electricity. Lee reveals that killers make elaborate dolls of their victims, one of the victims turning out to be Maroni. Buchinsky attacks his restaurant with an electrical bomb, knocking out Cobblepot (Robin Lord Taylor), but causing minimal damage.

When he wakes up, Cobblepot is confronted by Maroni, who suspects he's working with Falcone (John Doman). When he tries to leave, Buchinsky electrocutes the GCPD, knocking everyone unconscious. When he looks for Maroni, Gordon (using the overshoes) fights with him and spills water on his device, shutting it off. He arrests Buchinsky and gets his detective rank.

While walking, Liza (Makenzie Leigh) is abducted. She's relieved when the kidnapper turns out to be Mooney (Jada Pinkett Smith), telling her she's doing her move against Falcone. Mooney calls Falcone, threatening to hurt Liza if he doesn't retire. Falcone agrees to her terms as long as he and Liza leave for Sicily. Cobblepot arrives with Falcone and reveals to him that Liza is the mole in his organization, as Mooney employed her for her likeness to Falcone's mother.

Falcone visits Mooney's nightclub. He refuses to his terms and reveals about her truce. He has Mooney and Butch (Drew Powell) locked up and heartbroken, strangles Liza to death. He gives the nightclub to Cobblepot as Mooney and Butch are taken away. In GCPD, Gordon and Lee talk, which culminates in a kiss.

== Reception ==
=== Viewers ===
The episode was watched by 6.50 million viewers, with a 2.2 rating among 18-49 adults. With Live+7 DVR viewing factored in, the episode had an overall rating of 9.99 million viewers, and a 3.8 in the 18–49 demographic.

=== Critical reviews ===
Professional ratings
Review scores
Source	Rating
Rotten Tomatoes (Tomatometer)	64%
Rotten Tomatoes (Average Score)	6.5
IGN	6.4
The A.V. Club	B−
"GamesRadar"	4.5/5 stars
Paste Magazine	7.0
TV Fanatic	2.8/5 stars
New York Magazine	4/5 stars

"What the Little Bird Told Him" received mixed-to-positive reviews. The episode received a rating of 64% with an average score of 6.5 out of 10 on the review aggregator Rotten Tomatoes, with the site's consensus stating: "The character work in 'What the Little Bird Told Him,' along with the comeuppance of the Electrocutioner, are strong enough to overcome the anticlimactic face-off between Fish and Carmine Falcone."

Matt Fowler of IGN gave the episode a "okay" 6.4 out of 10 and wrote in his verdict, "I almost want to forgive the head-scratching moments from this week's Electrocutioner story since Gotham's usual M.O. for these types of villain cases is to dumb things down. Easy investigation, few bits of action, easy capture. But the Fish/Falcone story has been building since the first episode and it was a big let down. Never once did the show convince me that Falcone was so enraptured with Liza that he'd quit his life for her, nor did it ever show me Fish feeling anything but contempt for Falcone. She's killed so many people in her schemes to get to him...but she won't kill him? She'll leave her most powerful enemy alive? Possibly to return later on for revenge?"

The A.V. Club's Kyle Fowle gave the episode a "B−" grade and wrote, "Maybe I’m projecting Gotham’s season one extension onto this episode–or maybe I’m putting too much stock into the number "12" that designates this episode–but "What The Little Bird Told Him" sure feels like a penultimate episode of television. It engages with almost all of the storylines that have been a part of this season so far (notably absent is Gotham's most rewarding storyline to date, the continuing growth of Bruce Wayne and his badass butler Alfred) while moving its central pieces, specifically the mob bosses, into place for a finale. In any other season, this episode would set the stage for the thirteenth and final episode of the season. Gotham, originally scheduled for 16 episodes, still has 10 more to go though, and it's unclear how the show is going to be able to sustain the (very) slight momentum this episode built."
