= The Fire Chronicle =

2012 novel by John Stephens

- First edition cover
- Author: John Stephens
- Illustrator: Grady McFerrin
- Cover artist: Jon Foster; Grady McFerrin
- Genre: Fantasy
- Publisher: Alfred A. Knopf
- Publication date: October 9, 2012
- Publication place: United States
- Pages: 448
- ISBN: 978-0-375-87272-3
- Preceded by: The Emerald Atlas
- Followed by: The Black Reckoning

The Fire Chronicle is an adventure and fantasy novel written by John Stephens. The book was released on October 9, 2012. It is the second book of the trilogy, and the sequel of The Emerald Atlas.

== Synopsis ==
After the tumultuous events of last winter, protagonists Kate, Michael, and Emma long to continue the hunt for their missing parents. But they are soon discovered by their enemies, and a frantic chase sends Kate a hundred years into the past, where the various non-human sapients (Dwarves, Elves, Giants, Dragons, Trolls, etc.) are in preparation to create a parallel reality in which to hide from the Industrial Revolution. While searching for a way back to her brother and sister, she befriends 'Rafe', the innocent younger edition of the supreme antagonist 'Dire Magnus. Meanwhile, Michael and Emma set off to find the second of the Books of Beginning (the eponymous 'Fire Chronicle', which enables its user either to revive the dead, or to restore an individual's sense of purpose) which they ultimately win from the Dire Magnus' subordinates with the help of an Elvish colony. Meanwhile, as Kate spends time with Rafe, she gradually falls in love with him, and ultimately dies to save him despite knowing that he is going to be the next version of the Dire Magnus. The Dire Magnus then offers Rafe the chance to save Kate's life in return that he take his place as the new Dire Magnus, which Rafe accepts. He gives himself to the Dire Magnus in order for her to be saved and in doing so helps by sending her to the future (which, to Kate, is the present) for her to be saved by her brother. With the help of the Fire Chronicle, Michael is able to revive Kate back to life but unfortunately learns that Emma has been kidnapped by Rourke, one of the Dire Magnus's most trusted subordinates.
