= Heavydirtysoul (Gotham) =

- Gotham episode
- Episode no.: Season 3 Episode 22
- Directed by: Rob Bailey
- Written by: Robert Hull
- Cinematography by: Crescenzo Notarile
- Editing by: Leland Sexton
- Production code: T13.19922
- Original air date: June 5, 2017
- Running time: 43 minutes

Guest appearances
- Nathan Darrow as Victor Fries/Mr. Freeze; Alexander Siddig as Ra's al Ghul

Episode chronology
← Previous "Destiny Calling"	Next → "Pax Penguina"
- Gotham season 3

"Heavydirtysoul" is the twenty-second episode of the third season, the second part of the two-part season finale, and the 66th episode overall from the Fox series Gotham. The show is based on the characters created by DC Comics and set in the Batman mythology. The episode, written by co-executive producer Robert Hull and directed by Rob Bailey, was first broadcast on June 5, 2017. The episode marks the introduction of Solomon Grundy. In the episode, Gordon is taunted by Lee to give into his killer desires. At the same time, Nygma arranges a trade for Jervis Tetch, betraying Barbara. In the ensuing battle, Cobblepot captures Nygma to kill him. Bruce makes a fateful decision about his role in Gotham after his encounter with Ra's al Ghul.

== Plot ==
Alfred reminds Bruce of his parents' and his love for him, and this undoes the shamin's programming. He withdraws the sword from Alfred's chest, rejecting Ra's al Ghul's crowning as his heir. Ra's tells Bruce to use the Lazarus Pit to heal Alfred and leaves. Bruce takes water from the Pit and pours it on Alfred's wound, sealing the wound and waking him up. He then takes him to the hospital. Selina arrives, having heard about Alfred's condition, but Bruce dismisses her for her flippancy. She counters that her actions have been based on what she considers surviving in Gotham, and that unlike Bruce, she's accepted who she is.

In the GCPD, Gordon receives a call from Lee, who is planning to leave Gotham and wants him to join her. Gordon decides to leave with her in order to stay together. Nygma and Barbara begin to send demands to the mayor's office in exchange for the antidote, demanding Cobblepot in return. Gordon and Bullock then take Cobblepot out of his cell in order to bargain with them, but Nygma has taken Tetch, planning on killing Cobblepot once and for all.

Gordon and Bullock take Cobblepot to a factory where Nygma holds Tetch with a bomb connected to him in order to kill him if the deal goes awry. The meeting is interrupted by Barbara, Tabitha and Butch who try to retrieve Tetch. Cobblepot breaks free, knocks out Nygma and escapes in the police cruiser with him in the backseat. Seeing they cannot escape in time, Gordon cuts Tetch's throat to retrieve his blood for the antidote, and he and Bullock return to the GCPD to develop the cure. Unfortunately, Gordon finally succumbs to the virus and leaves the precinct. He tries to inject Lee with the antidote, but he fails multiple times. While he and Lee escape through the train station, Bullock intercepts them, but Gordon attacks him while Lee boards the train. Harvey urges him to remember his calling and affirms his friendship with Jim before giving him his badge back with two vials of the antidote on the back. On the train, Gordon injects Lee and then himzelf, freeing them from the virus.

Barbara confronts Butch about the betrayal and shoots him in the head. Nygma breaks free of Cobblepot's handcuffs but is goaded into returning to the port where he shot Cobblepot. However, this is part of Cobblepot's plan, having emptied Nygma's gun, and after Nygma pulls the trigger, Cobblepot reveals his ruse and Ivy and Fries who followed them in order to complete his task: to contain Nygma as a reminder to never let love weaken him again. Cobblepot then has Fries freeze Nygma.

Tabitha enters the safe house and finds a case on the table. Barbara walks in with gun in hand. They argue and then begin fighting, culminating in Tabitha using her whip to knock down a construction light that electrocutes and kills Barbara.

A news broadcast in the hospital reports that the antidote has been released and Gotham is returning to normal. Alfred finally wakes up and comforts Bruce, who confesses he is lost and doesn't know how to find his true self. Alfred urges him to forge his destiny based on what he loves.

Wanting to find security and influence, Selina goes to The Sirens Club and joins Tabitha, even testing her whip. Gordon arrives at Lee's Brownstone expect her to be waiting for him; instead, he finds a letter in which Lee states that she is leaving Gotham but that she believes in him. Cobblepot and Ivy display Nygma's frozen body as a sculpture for their new club: the Iceberg Lounge. Butch is revealed to be on life support in the hospital, and the doctors reveal that his birth name was Cyrus Gold. In the final scene, a young girl and her family wander through Crime Alley when they are assaulted by a mugger. Suddenly, a vigilante attacks the mugger and then escapes to a building rooftop. The vigilante removes his knit cap, revealing himself to be Bruce.

== Production ==
=== Development ===
In March 2017, Drew Powell announced that the twenty-second and final episode of the season would be titled "Heavydirtysoul" and was to be written by Robert Hull and directed by Rob Bailey. The episode is named after the Twenty One Pilots song of the same name.

=== Writing ===
In August 2016, the producers talked about introducing Harley Quinn into the series despite the character's success in the film Suicide Squad. Executive producer John Stephens explained that they would rather see a "proto-version" of Harley Quinn possibly in the third or fourth season. He also added introducing "proto-versions" of Killer Croc and Solomon Grundy in the show. In January 2017, the producers began to hint about Quinn's appearance in the third season finale with Stephens claiming that "we might see her in episode 22" and that the character would be the "launching point" for the central plot of season 4 and finally a few days before the episode, David Mazouz claimed the character would appear in the episode; consequently, a young girl (played by Meggie Vilcina) whose family Bruce Wayne rescues in the final moments of the episode is dressed in the color scheme of Quinn. In a June 2017 TVLine article, it was confirmed that there were no further plans at that time to feature Quinn on the show. While Quinn did not physically appear during the show's run, she was briefly referenced in the series finale by Jeremiah Valeska.

The episode also confirmed Solomon Grundy's debut in the series, revealing that Butch Gilzean was in fact born with the name "Cyrus Gold", the alter ego of Grundy. According to Drew Powell, he discovered about the revelation shortly after season 3 stated filming.

=== Casting ===
During Gotham's second season, media began to speculate that James Frain's character in the show would, in fact, be Ra's al Ghul, citing many similarities between the characters but the speculation ended when the character was killed off. However, on March 2, 2017, Alexander Siddig was cast to portray Ra's al Ghul. He was described as being the leader behind the Court of Owls and also the leader of the League of Shadows.

Chris Chalk and Michael Chiklis don't appear in the episode as their respective characters. In May 2017, it was announced that the guest cast for the episode would include Jada Pinkett Smith as Fish Mooney, Alexander Siddig as Ra's al Ghul, Camila Perez as Bridgit Pike/Firefly, Nathan Darrow as Victor Fries/Mr. Freeze, and B. D. Wong as Hugo Strange.

== Reception ==
=== Viewers ===
Airing back to back with the previous episode, the episode was watched by 3.03 million viewers with a 0.9/4 share among adults aged 18 to 49. This was a 5% decrease in viewership from the previous episode, which was watched by 3.17 million viewers with a 1.0/4 in the 18-49 demographics. With this rating, Gotham ranked third on its timeslot and third for the night behind The Bachelorette, and an NHL game.

With DVR factored in, the episode was watched by 4.78 million viewers with a 1.7 in the 18-49 demographics. Overall, the third season of Gotham averaged 4.52 million viewers, ranking 100th out of 165. This is a 16% decrease from the previous season, which was watched by 5.37 million viewers.

=== Critical reviews ===
Professional ratings
Review scores
Source	Rating
Rotten Tomatoes (Tomatometer)	100%
Rotten Tomatoes (Average Score)	8.07
IGN	7.2
TV Fanatic	5.0/5.0 stars
TV Overmind	4.5/5.0 stars

"Heroes Rise: Heavydirtysoul" received mostly positive reviews from critics. The episode received a rating of 100% with an average score of 8.07 out of 10 on the review aggregator Rotten Tomatoes.

Matt Fowler of IGN gave the episode a "good" 7.2 out of 10 and wrote in his verdict, "Gotham's never been able to land their finales quite right, and this giant, sprawling attempt to include and incorporate the show's entire ensemble wasn't any different really - but it was still the best finale to date after three years. Perhaps it's because we are getting closer to the end and Bruce is already dabbling in nocturnal vigilantism and Catwoman's ready to become less neutral good and more neutral evil."

Nick Hogan of TV Overmind gave the episode a 4.5 star rating out of 5, writing "With exception to my one little quibble, the finale of Gotham proved to be a launching point toward the Batman story. It was emotional, it was action-packed and intense, and left little to be desired. I'm already excited for the show to premiere in the fall." Amanda Bell of EW gave the episode a "B" and wrote, "This half of Gotham's third season has been filled with so many moving parts that, at times, it's been a bit dizzying to keep track of who wants to kill whom and why. But tonight's two-part finale sews up those dangling threads rather seamlessly and presents a new and, dare I say, optimistic vision for the future of this city."

Vinnie Mancuso of Collider wrote, "Gotham's two-part Season 3 finale took the series' most significant step forward, even offering up a proto-Dark Knight, in an effort to merge who these characters are with the figures they become. Like all great Batman stories, it did so by circling back to my original question, and attempting to show the true face of Gotham City itself." Lisa Babick of TV Fanatic gave the series a perfect 5 star rating out of 5, writing "Gotham finished off its third season with a two-hour finale that was mind-blowing in every way possible. It was a thrilling end that took us places we never thought Gotham would go." Robert Yanis, Jr. of Screen Rant wrote, "The two-part finale -- consisting of "Destiny Calling" and "Heavydirtysoul"—managed to both tie up loose ends of the season 3 arc and reinvigorate the series as it heads into season 4 later this year."

Kayti Burt of Den of Geek wrote, "It feels like a new chapter in this show is starting -- one that may finally see Gotham's heroes given the same narrative chances as its villains." Megan Vick of TV Guide wrote, "For an ending, it's a promising beginning to the show's upcoming fourth season."

=== Accolades ===
Sean Pertwee was named as honorable mention for TVLine's "Performer of the Week" for the week of June 4, 2017, for his performance in this episode. The site states, "Sean Pertwee made us feel the latter's fight to lure his ward away from the darkness, and toward a destiny as, you know, the Dark Knight." The episode also won an Emmy Award for Outstanding Special Visual Effects in a Supporting Role.
