= The Fearsome Dr. Crane =

- Gotham episode
- Episode no.: Season 1 Episode 14
- Directed by: John Behring
- Written by: John Stephens
- Production code: 4X6664
- Original air date: February 2, 2015

Guest appearances
- David Zayas as Salvatore "Sal" Maroni; Morena Baccarin as Dr. Lee Thompkins; Julian Sands as Dr. Gerald Crane; Maria Thayer as Scottie Mullens; Charlie Tahan as Jonathan Crane; Chelsea Spack as Kristen Kringle; Lillias White as Choir Member; Philip Hernandez as Medical Examiner Guerra; Brian Keane as Boat Captain

Episode chronology
← Previous "Welcome Back, Jim Gordon"	Next → "The Scarecrow"

"The Fearsome Dr. Crane" is the fourteenth episode of the television series Gotham. It premiered on FOX on February 2, 2015 and was written by John Stephens, and directed by John Behring. In this episode, Gordon (Ben McKenzie) and Bullock (Donal Logue) investigate homicides where the victims are killed with their greatest fear. Meanwhile, Maroni (David Zayas) begins to question his relationship with Cobblepot (Robin Lord Taylor) after a tip.

The episode was watched by 5.79 million viewers and received positive reviews with critics commenting on Scarecrow's debut and Julian Sands's disturbing performance.

== Plot ==
A man (Julian Sands) hangs another man from a building and kills him after dropping him from the building and steals his adrenal gland. While Cobblepot (Robin Lord Taylor) dines with Maroni (David Zayas), Maroni receives a call from Mooney (Jada Pinkett Smith), where she tells him Cobblepot works for Falcone (John Doman). Maroni then takes Cobblepot on a road trip.

Gordon (Ben McKenzie) finds Selina (Camren Bicondova) in his apartment. She says to him that she lied about Wayne's murderer and then flees. He visits Bruce (David Mazouz) where Bruce tells him that he relieves Gordon of his promise to find his parents' killers and that he will investigate the case himself. Cobblepot is taken to a shack in the woods where Maroni reveals the information Mooney gave him. Cobblepot takes Maroni's gun and attempts to shoot him, but the bullets turn out to be blank. Maroni knocks him unconscious.

Nygma (Cory Michael Smith) is suspended after performing an examination on a corpse from another medical examiner. The killer kidnaps a man afraid of pigs (swinophobia) but Gordon and Bullock (Donal Logue) find the man in a hideout. Receiving a tip that all of a recent group of victims were related to a phobia support group, Harvey investigates, and unbeknownst to him is introduced to the killer as a group member named "Tod". During the meeting, Tod lures the group leader away and tries to kill the woman by drowning her (her phobia) but he's stopped by Gordon and Bullock. They manage to save the woman, but "Tod" escapes.

Maroni takes Cobblepot to a car compactor, where he locks him in a car so he will die slowly in the crusher. Cobblepot calls from the car to the man who controls the compactor and threatens to have him killed by Falcone's men if he doesn't shut the compactor down. The car compactor operator stops the machine and flees. Maroni follows the operator, and Oswald escapes in the confusion. Nygma frames the medical examiner by making it look like he stole body parts. Cobblepot is then found by a group of church women on a bus to Gotham and accepts an offer of a ride home. Meanwhile, Mooney's boat is captured by a group of mercenaries. The episode ends as Mooney and a mercenary prepare to fight.

== Reception ==
=== Viewers ===
The episode was watched by 5.79 million viewers, with a 1.9 rating among 18-49 adults. With Live+7 DVR viewing factored in, the episode had an overall rating of 8.59 million viewers, and a 3.2 in the 18–49 demographic.

=== Critical reviews ===
Professional ratings
Review scores
Source	Rating
Rotten Tomatoes (Tomatometer)	88%
Rotten Tomatoes (Average Score)	7.7
IGN	7.6
The A.V. Club	C+
"GamesRadar"	3.5/5 stars
Paste Magazine	7.0
TV Fanatic	3.3/5 stars
New York Magazine	2/5 stars

"The Fearsome Dr. Crane" received positive reviews. The episode received a rating of 88% with an average score of 7.7 out of 10 on the review aggregator Rotten Tomatoes, with the site's consensus stating: "Though similar to previous episodes in form and feel, 'The Fearsome Dr. Crane' introduces a gratifyingly creepy villain while integrating humor and tension."

Matt Fowler of IGN gave the episode a "good" 7.6 out of 10 and wrote in his verdict, "The fearsome Dr. Crane parts of 'The Fearsome Dr. Crane' were actually the weakest parts of the episode, believe it or not. Maroni and Penguin had a great falling out (which Penguin barely escaped alive) and the Gordon/Dr. Thompkins relationship slowed down a bit so that the two of them could actually try to build a rapport outside of his work (though it didn't stray too far). As for that final scene with Fish on the boat? I don't know what that was about. That soldier busted in on her, the two of them shared a knowing glance, and then they leapt at each other like they were about to have an anime fight. I actually chuckled, though I don't expect that's what the scene was meant to evoke."

The A.V. Club's Kyle Fowle gave the episode a "C+" grade and wrote, "That kind of character development, which is admittedly minor, could have been used to bolster the Gerald Crane storyline. On any other show, I’d hold out hope for the second part of this arc exploring more of the dynamic between Gerald and Jonathan, and also giving us more insight into Bullock’s sudden crush on Mullen. But Gotham has proven time and again that character insight is an afterthought, that the audience should be satisfied just hearing the Crane name spoken. Next week’s episode is called “The Scarecrow”: what are the odds it amounts to more than just a hollow invocation of a canonical character in order to draw in viewers?"
