= They Who Hide Behind Masks =

- Gotham episode
- Episode no.: Season 4 Episode 3
- Directed by: Mark Tonderai
- Written by: Steven Lilien & Bryan Wynbrandt
- Cinematography by: Crescenzo Notarile
- Editing by: Sarah C. Reeves
- Production code: T40.10003
- Original air date: October 5, 2017
- Running time: 43 minutes

Guest appearances
- John Doman as Carmine Falcone; Ilana Becker as Myrtle Jenkins; Anthony Carrigan as Victor Zsasz; Kelcy Griffin as Harper

Episode chronology
← Previous "The Fear Reaper"	Next → "The Demon's Head"
- Gotham season 4

"They Who Hide Behind Masks" is the third episode of the fourth season and 69th episode overall from the Fox series Gotham. The show is itself based on the characters created by DC Comics set in the Batman mythology. The episode was written by co-executive producers Steven Lilien and Bryan Wynbrandt and directed by Mark Tonderai. It was first broadcast on October 5, 2017.

In the episode, Gordon travels to Miami in order to get Carmine Falcone's help in taking down Cobblepot for good. There, he meets with Falcone's daughter, Sofia, who also seems to take an interest in him. However, he soon discovers the truth: Falcone is dying and due to his health conditions, he can't leave the city. Meanwhile, Bruce continues discovering more about Ra's al Ghul and finds out about his origin and a certain item he takes an interest on: a 2,000 year old knife. He then competes with Barbara to get the knife. Meanwhile, Nygma is finally unfrozen by an obsessive fan but discovers he may not be the same as before.

The episode received positive reviews with critics praising Bruce's character development as well as the cinematography but Gordon's storyline attracted mixed response.

== Plot ==
In Arabia 125 A.D., a man on a horse is crossing a battlefield where many soldiers have died and takes an interest in one of them (Alexander Siddig). He takes the man to the Lazarus Pit, reviving him. He tells the man that he's his new heir and is given a dagger to take on the mantle of Ra's al Ghul.

Back to the present day, Bruce (David Mazouz) investigates a new merchandise that arrived at the docks at Cobblepot's (Robin Lord Taylor) name but finds a thief advancing to the boat. The thief arrives at a truck to steal the product but Bruce is caught by the guards. He manages to defeat them and escape but the thief also escapes, revealing to be Selina (Camren Bicondova). Meanwhile, Gordon (Ben McKenzie) travels to Miami to meet with Falcone (John Doman). He joins Falcone at a table, also accompanied by Sofia (Crystal Reed), Falcone's only daughter. He asks for Falcone's help in taking down Cobblepot but Falcone says he can't because he's dying and leaving the city would be risky for his health. Sofia then volunteers to stay with Gordon while he remains in Miami. Later, while meeting up at the beach, they end up kissing.

While Cobblepot and Zsasz (Anthony Carrigan) leave the club, a woman (Ilana Becker) uses a blowtorch to free Nygma (Cory Michael Smith) from his frozen state. She takes him to her hideout where Nygma gets shocked to discover that she's obsessed with him. The woman, Myrtle Jenkins, who went to school with him, reveals she is his "number one fan". She wants him to regain his strength so he can be "Gotham's greatest villain" with her as his sidekick, "The Riddlette". However, he begins to show signs of brain damage from the freezing process when he can't answer riddles and escapes. Meanwhile, Bruce inspects the freighter and discovers that the merchandise is a black market auction in Cobblepot's club. He is confronted by the guards until Alfred shows up and beats the guards. Barbara (Erin Richards) meets with Cobblepot to get a certain knife before the auction but is refused.

Bruce and Alfred discover that the knife was used to embalm King Balahsi, ruler of ancient Mesopotamia in the first century. They also discover in an ancient book an image of Ra's, an image taken 2,000 years ago. Bruce and Alfred attend the auction and Bruce takes the role of billionaire brat in order to get the knife. After battling with Barbara for the bidding, Bruce wins the knife for 2 million dollars. Later that night, Selina sneaks into Wayne Manor to retrieve it when she's confronted by Bruce. Bruce refuses to give back the knife and tells her to leave. Gordon returns to Gotham and is shocked to find Sofia there, seemingly wanting to help him. Cobblepot and Zsasz confront Myrtle for unfreezing Nygma. When she reveals Nygma's damaged mind, Cobblepot has Zsasz kill her. Meanwhile, in the streets, a confused Nygma sees posters for Cobblepot's club. Later, Barbara is confronted by Ra's. After a brief fight, they both talk about the knife. Ra's takes even more interest in Bruce after learning he has the knife and they both kiss.

== Production ==
=== Development ===
In September 2017, it was announced that the third episode of the season would be titled "They Who Hide Behind Masks" and was to be written by Steven Lilien & Bryan Wynbrandt and directed by Mark Tonderai.

=== Casting ===
Morena Baccarin, Jessica Lucas, Chris Chalk and Drew Powell don't appear in the episode as their respective characters. Baccarin, Lucas and Chalk receive credit only, while Powell is uncredited. In September 2017, it was announced that the guest cast for the episode would include Ilana Becker as Myrtle Jenkins, John Doman as Carmine Falcone, Anthony Carrigan as Victor Zsasz, and Kelcy Griffin as Detective Harper.

== Reception ==
=== Viewers ===
The episode was watched by 2.92 million viewers with a 0.9/3 share among adults aged 18 to 49. This was a slight increase in viewership from the previous episode, which was watched by 2.87 million viewers with a 0.9/3 in the 18-49 demographics. With these ratings, Gotham ranked second for Fox, behind The Orville, fourth on its timeslot, and eleventh for the night, behind The Orville, How to Get Away with Murder, Great News, The Good Place, Superstore, Chicago Fire, Scandal, Grey's Anatomy, Will & Grace, and Thursday Night Football.

=== Critical reviews ===
Professional ratings
Review scores
Source	Rating
IGN	7.8
TV Fanatic	3.5/5.0 stars
TV Overmind	4.0/5.0 stars

"A Dark Knight: They Who Hide Behind Masks" received positive reviews from critics. Matt Fowler of IGN gave the episode a "good" 7.8 out of 10 and wrote in his verdict, "'They Who Hide Behind Masks' honed in sharply on Bruce's vigilante tutelage at the hands of Alfred, who encouraged him to not only take on different personas, but to strongly play up a public 'spoiled brat' facade to achieve his goals. It worked really well thanks to Bruce's commitment and Alfred's savvy advice. Sure, there was some silliness to endure, but overall this was a good outing."

Nick Hogan of TV Overmind gave the episode a 4 star rating out of 5, writing "Overall I'd say this was Gotham Season 4's strongest episode yet. I'm so glad to see things working again that aren't ripped directly from a film." Sydney Bucksbaum of The Hollywood Reporter wrote, "Thanks to some advice from Alfred (Sean Pertwee) in this week's Gotham, Bruce (David Mazouz) invented his most famous character yet in his quest to be a secret vigilante by night by pretending to be a rich, obnoxious brat during the day."

Vinnie Mancuso of Collider wrote, "By now, we all know what it looks like when Bruce Wayne became Batman; we've watched a hundred times as he realized his tactical mask would be more effective with tiny, pointy ears, observed him sanding town perfectly good ninja stars until they look vaguely like bats, witnessed his parents' murder so many times we're all technically responsible on a moral level by this point. But 'They Who Hide Behind Masks' — an incredibly serious title for an incredibly silly episode of Gotham — marked a rare time that we got to watch Bruce Wayne become 'Bruce Wayne' for the first time." Lisa Babick of TV Fanatic gave the series a 3.5 star rating out of 5, writing "'They Who Hide Behind Masks' was a mixed bag. A great storyline was introduced with Sophia Falcone and The Riddler is free, but we had to suffer through a cheesy Bruce Wayne not once, but twice."
