= The Fear Reaper =

- Gotham episode
- Episode no.: Season 4 Episode 2
- Directed by: Louis Shaw Milito
- Written by: Danny Cannon
- Cinematography by: Scott Kevan
- Editing by: Leland Sexton
- Production code: T40.10002
- Original air date: September 28, 2017
- Running time: 43 minutes

Guest appearances
- Damian Young as Warden Reed; Maggie Geha as Ivy Pepper; Charlie Tahan as Jonathan Crane / Scarecrow; Michael Maize as Grady; Anthony Carrigan as Victor Zsasz

Episode chronology
← Previous "Pax Penguina"	Next → "They Who Hide Behind Masks"
- Gotham season 4

"The Fear Reaper" is the second episode of the fourth season and 68th episode overall from the Fox series Gotham. The show is itself based on the characters created by DC Comics set in the Batman mythology. The episode was written by executive producer Danny Cannon and directed by Louis Shaw Milito. It was first broadcast on September 28, 2017.

In the episode, Jim Gordon goes after Jonathan Crane, who now calls himself "The Scarecrow". Planning to expose his demons, Jonathan creates a mutiny in Arkham Asylum, and Gordon, alone, decides to face it himself. Jonathan sprays the prisoners with the fear gas and all are under his control. Meanwhile, Oswald Cobblepot confronts the GCPD and seeks to form an alliance with Barbara Kean, who is revealed to be alive, but Barbara still has her own plans. At the same time, Bruce continues his journey to his night activities.

The episode receive generally positive reviews with critics praising Bruce's storyline and Charlie Tahan's performance but the Arkham storyline received criticism.

== Plot ==
The GCPD arrives at the Crane house to discover the experimentation tests. Gordon (Ben McKenzie) and Harvey Bullock (Donal Logue) discover Grady (Michael Maize) hung up in the yard as a scarecrow, screaming that "The Scarecrow" is coming.

Bruce (David Mazouz) gets released from the GCPD, claiming he was on the roof with Selina and accidentally fell through the skylight. Although suspecting him, Gordon decides to let him go, but Fox (Chris Chalk) also suspects Bruce of having alternative intentions. In Arkham Asylum, Scarecrow (Charlie Tahan) confronts Warden Reed (Damian Young) who is burning evidence. Scarecrow accuses him of tormenting Jonathan for three years and then sprays him with fear gas. Reed is tormented by evil clowns who are actually the staff and patients in Arkham, grabs a gun, and starts killing them as he runs through the hallways. Meanwhile, Scarecrow enters the infirmary where the inmates are confined to their beds and sprays them before releasing them to roam Arkham.

Cobblepot (Robin Lord Taylor) arrives at the GCPD and confronts Gordon for not catching Jonathan. Bullock ridicules Cobblepot for his behavior while under the influence of the fear gas at the club opening, which made the headline of the Gotham newspaper. They then a make a deal that Gordon must catch Jonathan within 24 hours, otherwise Cobblepot will clean the city his way.

Selina (Camren Bicondova) and Tabitha (Jessica Lucas) are summoned to a building after they've received a card saying "An Opportunity Awaits" where they shockingly discover Barbara (Erin Richards) is alive and has created a new plan. She reveals an arsonal of weapons and proposes the creation of a new criminal empire to sell weapons with their help, Tabitha refuses saying that she killed Butch Gilzean and took everything from her, and she leaves with Selina. Selina tries to convince Tabitha that the plan would be good for them but Tabitha is unwilling because of Barbara's betrayal. Barbara is visited by Cobblepot and Victor Zsasz and told that she needs to abide by Cobblepot's licensing agreements or he will destroy her. He forces her to agree to a deal under threat of death and then leaves.

Bullock shares the report of a riot at Arkham. Gordon decides to stop it, but no one in the precinct, including Bullock, is willing to take on Scarecrow. Gordan accuses them of betraying their oaths to law and order and embracing Penguin's control of Gotham and leaves to take on Scarecrow and the inmates by himself. Entering Arkham, Gordan is attacked by the inmates and the Warden, who is now wearing clown makeup. He escapes them and finds the Warden's office, where he encounters Scarecrow who now wields a scythe; they fight, and Gordan is knocked against a wall. Removing his mask, Jonathan decides to get his revenge for Gordan killing his father. After chasing him, Jonathan sprays him with gas, making Gordon hallucinate Lee's (Morena Baccarin) suicide. Jonathan tries to compel him to kill himself, but Gordon resists and overcomes the effects of the gas. He is then attacked by inmates in a hall, but while defending himself, he discovers water dissolves the gas. He uses a fire sprinkler to wash away the fear toxin and heal everyone, but Jonathan escapes.

Bruce begins stalking a gang and follows them to a building, but he is caught and attacked by the gang before finally using his skills to defeat them and escape. He is confronted by the leader who he is the knocked out by Alfred (Sean Pertwee). Back at Wayne Manor, they argue over Bruce's careless actions but are interrupted by Fox. Fox says that he is aware of his activities, but he also opens a case containing a special, bulletproof suit that Wayne Enterprises developed for military purposes.

Tabitha and Selina eventually decide to team up with Barbara, but Tabitha reveals a butchers knife and demands to chop off Barbara's hand to show her commitment and as retribution for Barbara's betrayal with Edward Nygma, killing of Butch, and since she and Butch both lost their hands to Cobblepot. Barbara agrees, and Tabitha slams down the knife, intentionally missing Barbara's hand. Tabitha reveals she was testing her to prove her trust. She turns around and walks out as she says she'll start work on Monday.

Gordon arrives at the GCPD and is confronted by Cobblepot, who rates him for failing. Meanwhile, Ivy (Maggie Geha) goes to a potions store and demands the storekeeper give them to her. He refuses, but Ivy uses her perfume to interrogate him to reveal the location and the combination to the safe. She seizes one of the potions and gulps it down as the storekeeper yells not to; her face mutates as the potion takes effect. Gordon and Bullock go to a bar where Harvey suggests that they would require an army to take down Cobblepot. Gordon then decides to visit Falcone. That night, Bruce begins practicing with his new suit.

== Production ==
=== Development ===
In June 2017, it was announced that the second episode of the season would be titled "The Fear Reaper" and was to be written by Danny Cannon and directed by Louis Shaw Milito.

=== Writing ===
According to Stephens, the episode handles a horror-oriented direction on the season: "At the very beginning of the season, Penguin has solidified his control upon Gotham like never before. Where he's kind of unionized crime. And Scarecrow comes in to basically reintroduce fear into Gotham and to remind people that the dark is still scary out there. And we're really going to fashion, especially Episode 2, almost a horror movie episode where we really get to see Scarecrow. I think he's like purely terrifying. Imagine, rather than the other versions of Scarecrow out there — because there are a lot of different versions — what if you just really tell Scarecrow as a horror movie? Because he could be scary as hell." Executive producer Danny Cannon stated, "When the studio asks you to tone back because it's too scary, you know you've done something right!"

=== Casting ===
Cory Michael Smith, Drew Powell, Crystal Reed and Alexander Siddig don't appear in the episode as their respective characters, with Smith and Siddig receiving credit only, while Powell and Reed were uncredited. In September 2017, it was announced that the guest cast for the episode would include Michael Maize as Grady Harris, Charlie Tahan as Jonathan Crane, Anthony Carrigan as Victor Zsasz, Damian Young as Warden Reed and Maggie Geha as Ivy Pepper.

== Reception ==
=== Viewers ===
The episode was watched by 2.87 million viewers with a 0.9/3 share among adults aged 18 to 49. This was an 11% decrease in viewership from the previous episode, which was watched by 3.21 million viewers with a 1.0/4 in the 18-49 demographics. With these ratings, Gotham ranked second Fox, behind The Orville, and tenth for the night, behind How to Get Away with Murder, The Orville, Superstore, Great News, The Good Place, Chicago Fire, Grey's Anatomy, Thursday Night Football, and Will & Grace.

=== Critical reviews ===
Professional ratings
Review scores
Source	Rating
IGN	7.2
TV Fanatic	4.8/5 stars
TV Overmind	3.5/5.0 stars

"A Dark Knight: The Fear Reaper" received generally positive reviews from critics. Matt Fowler of IGN gave the episode a "good" 7.2 out of 10 and wrote in his verdict, "While Scarecrow screamed, swung his scythe, and sprayed lunatics with fear toxin, this episode honed in some more on the GCPD's current crisis of conscience. It's an interesting journey to take but also one that smacks of the shows past sins regarding a poorly-manned (and conceived) police force - with Jim Gordon now trying to be the guiding light."

Nick Hogan of TV Overmind gave the episode a 3.5 star rating out of 5, writing "Overall, I'm still on the fence about Season 4. There's a lot of potential here for some wonderful stories, but is it too early for Batman? If it's not too early for Batman, is it too similar to the Christopher Nolan films? I suppose only time will tell. For now, I'm still in, and this is still a fun show." Sydney Bucksbaum of The Hollywood Reporter wrote, "Despite getting electrocuted last season, Babs (Erin Richards) made her return to Gotham this week, albeit more calm than usual. No matter what, it's amazing to see Babs and Tabs on the same side again. We could be seeing Gotham City Sirens on TV before the movie comes out."

Vinnie Mancuso of Collider wrote, "Really, the water issue is just indicative of 'The Fear Reaper' as a whole, which is as lazy an episode of Gotham as you're ever going to get." Lisa Babick of TV Fanatic gave the series a 4.8 star rating out of 5, writing "Now that Bruce is all teched up, with Alfred's help he should be able to fight bigger and better crimes. Maybe Penguin's goons won't be the ones to capture Crane; maybe Bruce will be the hero on this one. The interesting part of this story will be when Jim catches a whiff that there's a vigilante on the loose, and capturing Crane might be the thing that puts Bruce on the map." Kayti Burt of Den of Geek wrote, "This group has come a long way since that time Barbara let Selina and Ivy live in her sweet penthouse apartment back in Season 1 (I really hope Gotham references this at some point this season). I am 100% in for Gotham's twisted Birds of Prey storyline. If you need pointers, Bruce Wayne and the GCPD. This is what poetic justice looks like on Gotham."
