= Albert Chan (disambiguation) =

Albert Chan (born 1955) is a Hong Kong politician in the pan-Democratic camp.

Albert Chan may also refer to:

- Albert Sun-Chi Chan (born 1950), president of Hong Kong Baptist University from 2010 to 2015
- Albert M. Chan (born 1975), Canadian actor and director based in the United States

== See also ==
- Albert Chen, Hong Kong University professor of law
