= The Demon's Head =

- Gotham episode
- Episode no.: Season 4 Episode 4
- Directed by: Kenneth Fink
- Written by: Ben McKenzie
- Cinematography by: Scott Kevan
- Editing by: Barrie Wise
- Production code: T40.10004
- Original air date: October 12, 2017
- Running time: 43 minutes

Guest appearances
- Nathan Darrow as Victor Fries/Mr. Freeze; Dakin Matthews as Dr. Niles Winthrop; Benjamin Stockham as Alex Winthrop; Owen Harn as The Hunter; Anthony Carrigan as Victor Zsasz; Kelcy Griffin as Harper; Anthony Rodriguez as Anubis

Episode chronology
← Previous "They Who Hide Behind Masks"	Next → "The Blade's Path"
- Gotham season 4

"The Demon's Head" is the fourth episode of the fourth season and 70th episode overall from the Fox series Gotham. The show is itself based on the characters created by DC Comics set in the Batman mythology. The episode was written by main cast member Ben McKenzie on his writing debut and directed by Kenneth Fink. It was first broadcast on October 12, 2017.

In the episode, Bruce and Alfred set out to discover more about the knife and its importance to Ra's al Ghul. They leave the knife with a museum curator Dr. Niles Winthrop and his grandson, Alex, to research more about the knife. However, Ra's continues his search for the knife, killing Niles in the process. Alex manages to escape, and Bruce needs to find him to know more about the knife. Meanwhile, Cobblepot and Sofia create a business together, but this brings major consequences for Sofia. Nygma also continues trying to restore his previous persona after struggling through his Riddler persona.

The episode received positive reviews from critics, who highlighted the writing, Alexander Siddig's performance, and the development of Bruce Wayne's storyline.

== Plot ==
Bruce (David Mazouz) and Alfred (Sean Pertwee) take the knife to antiquist Niles Winthrop (Dakin Matthews) to discover its secrets. They are joined by his grandson, Alex (Benjamin Stockham), who also takes an interest in the knife. Winthrop asks Bruce to leave it overnight so he and Alex can research it, so Bruce and Alfred leave. Meanwhile, Nygma (Cory Michael Smith) tries to restore his abilities by testing himself with riddles, but he is distracted by his obsession with getting revenge on Cobblepot (Robin Lord Taylor).

That night, Niles decipher part of the runes on the knife as a prophecy about "The Demon's Head." According to legend, a man was resurrected and is identified as "Ra's al Ghul." When Ra's (Alexander Siddig) arrives looking for the knife, Niles has Alex hide. When he refuses to give the location of the knife, Ra's snap Niles's neck. While Gordon (Ben McKenzie) investigates the murder, Bruce arrives and sees Niles' body. As Bruce explains his meeting with Niles, he tells Gordan about Alex's involvement and that Barbara (Erin Richards) also wanted the knife. Ra's meets with Barbara and introduces her to "Anubis," a man manipulated to act like a dog to track the knife.

Cobblepot meets with Sofia Falcone (Crystal Reed) in his office to discuss business. He then receives a message from a man sent by Nygma, asking to meet in the pier. Gordon goes to interrogate Barbara, but their meeting is interrupted by Bruce, who accuses Barbara of working with Ra's, but she denies being involved. As they leave, Bruce realizes where Alex might be, and they find Alex in the Gotham Library. As they talk, they are attacked by Anubis and an assassin (Owen Harn) who Ra's has sent to find Alex and the knife. While Gordan fights them off, Bruce and Alex flee. At the GCPD, Gordon is met by Ra's, who claims to be a diplomat from Nanda Parbat. While they talk in the captain's office, Alfred arrives, see Ra's and attacks him interrupts and attacks him. Gordan drags Alfred out if the room but is inturrupted by another officer. They rush back into the office to discover Ra's has disappeared.

Sofia meets with three of Falcone's loyal mobsters who had been in hiding, but they are interrupted by Cobblepot and Zsasz (Anthony Carrigan). While Zsasz executes the mobsters, Cobblepot tells Sofia that he used her to draw out the mobsters and eliminate them as competition. He then receives another invitation from Nygma to meet. Meanwhile, Bruce and Alex flee to the National Museum, but they are attacked by the assassin and Anubis. Gordon arrives and kills both, but Ra's shows up and holds Alex hostage, demanding the knife. When Bruce, who realizes the significance of the knife, refuses, Ra's kills Alex and allows himself to be arrested.

Nygma shows up in Cobblepot's club, demanding to meet him. Cobblepot appears and explains that he didn't show up because his riddles are nonsense and illogical despite Nygma's arrogance. Cobblepot points out that Nygma's intellectual abilities are gone so he is no longer capable of being the Riddler and has reverted to Edward Nygma. Cobblepot is about to have Victor Fries (Nathan Darrow) freeze Nygma again, but he changes his mind, deciding that it's better for Nygma to live with the humiliation that he is no longer capable of being The Riddler.

Sofia meets with Gordon to discuss what happened to Cobblepot. After an argument, they kiss passionately. Meanwhile, Ra's is escorted to prison, smiling, implying this is part of his plan.

== Production ==
=== Development ===
In September 2017, it was announced that the fourth episode of the season would be titled "The Demon's Head" and was to be written by Ben McKenzie on his writing debut and directed by Kenneth Fink.

=== Writing ===
Ben McKenzie made his writing debut on the episode, after previously directing the third-season episode, "These Delicate and Dark Obsessions". McKenzie went to Los Angeles to work on the writers' room to break the story and then go back to New York City and finish many drafts. He explained, "I've been fiddling around with writing for a long time, but I'd never written an episode of television, so it was quite a learning process." He also added that, "From being on a set, the directing came fairly naturally. It was challenging, but there were a lot of things that I understood about directing just from observing, just from watching director's work. Writing often takes place behind-the-scenes. Physical production is not privy to how scripts come out... I wasn't so familiar with that process of breaking a story, of starting with a story document, then an outline, and then a draft; it was informative"

=== Casting ===
Morena Baccarin, Camren Bicondova, Jessica Lucas, Chris Chalk and Drew Powell don't appear in the episode as their respective characters. Baccarin, Bicondova, Lucas and Chalk receive credit only, while Powell is uncredited In September 2017, it was announced that the guest cast for the episode would include Dakin Matthews as Niles Winthrop, Benjamin Stockham as Alex Winthrop, Nathan Darrow as Mr. Freeze, Anthony Carrigan as Victor Zsasz, and Kelcy Griffin as Detective Harper.

== Reception ==
=== Viewers ===
The episode was watched by 2.75 million viewers with a 0.9/3 share among adults aged 18 to 49. This was a 6% decrease in viewership from the previous episode, which was watched by 2.92 million viewers with a 0.9/3 in the 18-49 demographics. With these ratings, Gotham ranked second for Fox, behind The Orville, fourth on its timeslot, and eleventh for the night, behind The Orville, How to Get Away with Murder, Great News, Superstore, Chicago Fire, The Good Place, Scandal, Will & Grace, Grey's Anatomy, and Thursday Night Football.

=== Critical reviews ===
Professional ratings
Review scores
Source	Rating
IGN	7.5
TV Fanatic	4.5/5.0 stars
TV Overmind	4.5/5.0 stars

"A Dark Knight: The Demon's Head" received positive reviews from critics. Matt Fowler of IGN gave the episode a "good" 7.5 out of 10 and wrote in his verdict, "'The Demon's Head' had a few clunky scenes and a couple of humdrum mini-bosses, but Bruce's hard choice at the end, which led to the shocking death of Alex, was an unexpectedly heavy capper that gave this chapter a grave and ghoulish sheen."

Nick Hogan of TV Overmind gave the episode a 4 star rating out of 5, writing "This was easily the best episode of Gotham this season. I'm anxious to see more writing from Ben McKenzie, and I'm excited that Gotham has finally set forth some higher stakes that aren't derived directly from the film series. Of course, I understand that the source material is the same, but I'm always anxious for a new take." Sydney Bucksbaum of The Hollywood Reporter wrote, "Speaking of the literal Demon's Head, the hard-to-spell Ra's al Ghul wasn't trying hard to operate under the radar while on the hunt for his ancient knife, killing the man Bruce hired to study it."

Vinnie Mancuso of Collider wrote, "All in all, 'The Demon's Head' was a middle-of-the-road hour of Gotham, fine but not quite 'James Frain getting blown up by a bazooka' great, silly but not quite Balloonman ridiculous. The feral, fanged dog-man Anubis and his mute brute of an owner made for intimidating enough villains-of-the-week; throwing a bone out a window isn't the most inventive way of dispatching with an antagonist, but given Gotham's history I'm just glad it didn't involve a water bowl." Lisa Babick of TV Fanatic gave the series a 4.5 star rating out of 5, writing "I can't believe Ra's al Ghul slit Alex's throat. I mean I can believe it, but it doesn't take away from the shock of it. Ra's al Ghul knew that Bruce wouldn't give up the knife on Gotham Season 4 Episode 4, and killing Alex seemed to be part of the plan to push Bruce further towards his destiny."
