= Willie C. Carpenter =

American actor

- Born: September 18, 1941 (age 84)
- Other name: Willie Carpenter
- Occupation: Actor
- Years active: 1978–present

Willie C. Carpenter is an American actor. He is perhaps best known for his recurring roles on Reasonable Doubts as Robert Maxwell, 1600 Penn as General Maurer, and Devious Maids as Kenneth Miller.

== Filmography ==
Film
Year	Title	Role	Notes
1978	The Wiz	Aunt Em's Party	Credited as Willie Carpenter
1988	The Chair	Al	
1989	Family Business	'Caper' Cop	
1991	Grand Canyon	Simon's Friend	
1992	Double Trouble	Police Captain	
1992	Amityville 1992: It's About Time	Doctor	Video
1993	Hard Target	Elijah Roper	Credited as Willie Carpenter
1993	Dollman vs. Demonic Toys	Police Officer	Video
1994	Little Giants	Ref #1	
1995	My Family	I.N.S. Guard	
1995	White Man's Burden	Marcus	
1996	Albino Alligator	Reporter	
1997	Men in Black	Police Inspector	
1997	The Underground	The Hound	
1997	Around the Time	Role Unknown	Short; credited as Willie Carpenter
1999	At First Sight	Jack Falk	Credited as Willie Carpenter
1999	The Hunter's Moon	Horace	Video
1999	The Best Man	Pastor	Credited as Willie Carpenter
1999	The Insider	John Harris	
2000	Followers	Mr. Trayer	
2003	Leprechaun: Back 2 tha Hood	Father Jacob	Video
2007	Take	Aging Man	
2007	Bleeding Rose	Ebony's Father	Video
2008	Dudley's Raft	Judge Prestly	Short
2011	Under-Tow	Norman	Short
2011	Life of Lemon	Lester	
2013	Jonestown	Willie	Short
2014	Ride	Doorman	
2015	The Adderall Diaries	Judge Goodman	
2016	Collateral Beauty	Board Member	
2016	Criticsized	Captain Pollard	
2017	The Discovery	Hospital Janitor	
2017	Humor Me	Ellis	
2017	Brawl in Cell Block 99	Lefty	
2018	Monster	Judge	
2020	The Block Island Sound	Chief Rogers	
2022	The Independent	Hal James	

Television
Year	Title	Role	Notes
2015	Gotham	Leon Winkler	Episode: "Welcome Back, Jim Gordon"
2022	Reacher	Town Barber Mosley	6 episodes
2025	Found	Bernie	Episode: "Missing While Grieving"
2024	Diarra from Detroit	Photo Shop Owner	Episode: "Snapshots of a Rendezvous"
