= Rogues' Gallery (Gotham) =

- Gotham episode
- Episode no.: Season 1 Episode 11
- Directed by: Oz Scott
- Written by: Sue Chung
- Production code: 4X6661
- Original air date: January 5, 2015

Guest appearances
- David Zayas as Salvatore "Sal" Maroni; Drew Powell as Butch Gilzean; Morena Baccarin as Dr. Leslie Thompkins; Christopher Heyerdahl as Jack Gruber; Allyce Beasley as Dorothy Duncan; Clare Foley as Ivy Pepper; John Enos III as Jimmy Saviano; Kevin McCormick as Aaron Danzig; Anthony Grasso as Ganza; Isiah Whitlock, Jr. as Dr. Gerry Lang

Episode chronology
← Previous "Lovecraft"	Next → "What the Little Bird Told Him"

"Rogues' Gallery" is the eleventh episode and mid-season premiere of the television series Gotham. It premiered on FOX on January 5, 2015, and was written by Sue Chung, and directed by Oz Scott. In this episode, Gordon (Ben McKenzie) is transferred to Arkham Asylum and tries to avoid a conflict when inmates riot with the help of Dr. Leslie Thompkins (Morena Baccarin).

The episode was watched by 7.06 million viewers, an improvement over the previous episode. It received mixed reviews, with critics criticizing the time spent in Arkham Asylum. On January 17, 12 days after the episode aired, FOX announced Gotham would be renewed for a second season.

== Plot ==
Gordon (Ben McKenzie) has been transferred to Arkham Asylum after Dick Lovecraft's "suicide". During a play, inmates wreak havoc, sending some to the infirmary. Director Dr. Gerry Lang (Isiah Whitlock, Jr.) begins to doubt about his progression in the Asylum. He stands guard on an inmate at the infirmary as Dr. Leslie Thompkins (Morena Baccarin) treats him. In the streets, Selina (Camren Bicondova) discovers Ivy (Clare Foley) living behind a dumpster in the rain. She takes Ivy to Barbara Kean's penthouse to sleep.

Mysterious attacks continue to take place in Arkham, upsetting Lang, as all the attacks happened during Gordon's guard. After help from Bullock (Donal Logue), they discover that the prisoner, Jack Gruber (Christopher Heyerdahl) is behind the attacks, planning on escaping the Asylum. A nurse, Dorothy Duncan (Allyce Beasley) turns out to be an inmate and frees the prisoners. The inmates wreak havoc in the Asylum, killing guards and Dr. Lang. Among the escapees is Gruber, who flees with Aaron Danzig (Kevin McCormick).

At their apartment, Renee Montoya (Victoria Cartagena) decides to break up with Barbara (Erin Richards), thinking she is deteriorating her health. Cobblepot is arrested when he tries to charge more to Maroni's (David Zayas) fishermen of what they get. He is released and chastised by Maroni for his actions, who reveals he ordered his arrest to teach him a lesson about hubris. Fish Mooney (Jada Pinkett Smith) reunites with an underboss, Jimmy Saviano (John Ennos III) to take out Falcone (John Doman). Her right-hand, Butch Gilzean (Drew Powell), meets with him at the port. Saviano offers Butch a place with him if he betrays Mooney. He refuses and kills Saviano.

== Reception ==
=== Viewers ===
The episode was watched by 7.06 million viewers, with a 2.5 rating among 18-49 adults. With Live+7 DVR viewing factored in, the episode had an overall rating of 10.10 million viewers, and a 3.8 in the 18–49 demographic.

=== Critical reviews ===
Professional ratings
Review scores
Source	Rating
Rotten Tomatoes (Tomatometer)	43%
Rotten Tomatoes (Average Score)	6.2
IGN	7.2
The A.V. Club	C−
"GamesRadar"	4/5 stars
Paste Magazine	7.5
TV Fanatic	2.5/5 stars
New York Magazine	2/5 stars

"Rogues' Gallery" received mixed reviews. The episode received a rating of 43% with an average score of 6.2 out of 10 on the review aggregator Rotten Tomatoes, with the site's consensus stating: "While we've been waiting to spend time in Gotham's Arkham Asylum, 'Rogue's Gallery' was cluttered, confused, and borderline boring."

Matt Fowler of IGN gave the episode a "good" 7.2 out of 10 and wrote in his verdict, "I could have actually stood for more Arkham this week rather than paying obligatory visits to so many of the other Gothamites. I wanted more Leslie and more intrigue within the asylum walls. Plus, things are also now starting to point toward the Wayne Foundation, or some other big bad, in the shadows."

The A.V. Club's Kyle Fowle gave the episode a "C−" grade and wrote, "'Rogues' Gallery,' much like Gotham as a whole, suffers from a baffling identity crisis, as evidenced in the episode's opening moments. In the span of just a few minutes, we're re-introduced to all the relevant storylines via a montage. We see Jim Gordon on guard at Arkham Asylum as the inmates put on an incompetent production of Shakespeare. We see Harvey Bullock quietly pondering his life, or perhaps his next fedora purchase, while drinking from a flask. We see Selina Kyle peering out into the rain, also pondering, and Barbara sleeping next to Montoya, bottles of pills strewn about the nightstand. Establishing where these characters are isn't a misguided move, but the execution is off and indicative of what plagues this show as a whole. One minute we're meant to be laughing at the crazy Asylum patients and their strange rendition of Shakespeare, and the next we're meant to be contemplating the seriousness of the situation Gordon has got himself into, and how widespread corruption has corroded the city of Gotham and allowed good guys like Gordon to be buried. There's a frustrating imbalance here, all in the first few minutes. It's jarring to go from a comical stage play to an investigation into amateur shock therapy, followed shortly by an exploration of deeply-felt insecurity in romantic relationships. Gotham wants to be too many things at once, and it’s to the detriment of narrative precision and intrigue."
