= Hog Day Afternoon =

Hog Day Afternoon may refer to:

- Hog Day Afternoon (Gotham)
- Hog Day Afternoon (Kappa Mikey)
