= Welcome Back, Jim Gordon =

- Gotham episode
- Episode no.: Season 1 Episode 13
- Directed by: Wendey Stanzler
- Written by: Megan Mostyn-Brown
- Production code: 4X6663
- Original air date: January 26, 2015

Guest appearances
- Drew Powell as Butch Gilzean; Clare Foley as Ivy Pepper; Anthony Carrigan as Victor Zsasz; Niko Nicotera as Derek Delaware; Michael Eklund as Bob; Willie C. Carpenter as Leon Winkler; Berto Colón as Narco Cop #1; Carol Kane as Gertrude Kapelput; Dash Mihok as Det. Arnold Flass

Episode chronology
← Previous "What the Little Bird Told Him"	Next → "The Fearsome Dr. Crane"

"Welcome Back, Jim Gordon" is the thirteenth episode of the television series Gotham. It premiered on FOX on January 26, 2015, and was written by Megan Mostyn-Brown, and directed by Wendey Stanzler. In this episode, Gordon (Ben McKenzie) and Bullock (Donal Logue) investigate the murder of a witness in a public homicide. Meanwhile, Mooney (Jada Pinkett Smith) suffers the consequences of her failed plan against Carmine Falcone.

The episode was watched by 6.04 million viewers and received generally positive reviews, praising character development but criticizing the pace.

== Plot ==
Fish Mooney (Jada Pinkett Smith) is being tortured by Carmine Falcone's interrogator, Bob (Michael Eklund). Gordon (Ben McKenzie) and Bullock (Donal Logue) work with narcotics detective Arnold Flass (Dash Mihok) in a public homicide. They interrogate Leon Winkler (Willie C. Carpenter), who witnessed the homicide. While waiting for an interrogation, Winkler is killed with an icepick by an unknown man.

Butch Gilzean (Drew Powell) manages to free himself and Mooney from her captors. Gordon interrogates Narcotics Officer Derek Delaware (Niko Nicotera) about his role in the guard duty. He arrests him when he finds drugs in his car, the same type as in the victim's shoe. Sarah Essen (Zabryna Guevara) removes Gordon and Bullock from the case. In the file room, Flass mocks a letter Nygma (Cory Michael Smith) wrote for Miss Kringle (Chelsea Spack). She later apologizes to Ed for Flass' behavior.

Cobblepot (Robin Lord Taylor) surprises his mother (Carol Kane) with the nightclub and makes her a singer in the club. Gordon visits and asks for a favor from Cobblepot to get information about Flass. After Penguin sends everybody else home, he closes the nightclub and begins to celebrate, when he's surprised by Mooney. She starts to beat him with a baseball bat when Victor Zsasz (Anthony Carrigan) and his henchmen arrive. Butch sacrifices himself so Mooney can escape.

Bruce (David Mazouz), having returned from Switzerland, runs into Ivy Pepper (Clare Foley) in the streets. He asks after Selina (Camren Bicondova) and Ivy arranges a meeting for twenty dollars. Selina visits him in Wayne Manor, where she says she lied and doesn't know who killed his parents and tells him to never contact her again.

Cobblepot has his henchman extort Delaware by threatening to kill his wife to get information about Flass. The henchman then gives Delaware's confession on tape and the murder weapon to Gordon, and Flass is arrested for the murder of both victims. Later, Bullock reunites with Mooney, who is planning to flee town and lie low. They part with a kiss. Gordon is approached by Delaware to beg Gordon not to harm his family. Gordon sees that the favor Cobblepot gave him now makes him look like he is dirty and someone to be feared.

== Reception ==
=== Viewers ===
The episode was watched by 6.04 million viewers, with a 2.1 rating among 18-49 adults. With Live+7 DVR viewing factored in, the episode had an overall rating of 9.07 million viewers, and a 3.4 in the 18–49 demographic.

=== Critical reviews ===
Professional ratings
Review scores
Source	Rating
Rotten Tomatoes (Tomatometer)	67%
Rotten Tomatoes (Average Score)	6.3
IGN	6.8
The A.V. Club	C
"GamesRadar"	3/5 stars
Paste Magazine	6.5
TV Fanatic	2.6/5 stars
New York Magazine	3/5 stars

"Welcome Back, Jim Gordon" received generally positive reviews. The episode received a rating of 67% with an average score of 6.3 out of 10 on the review aggregator Rotten Tomatoes, with the site's consensus stating: "'Welcome Back, Jim Gordon' focuses on the growth of Gotham's many leading players, making it a colorful, though hectic, episode."

Matt Fowler of IGN gave the episode a "okay" 6.8 out of 10 and wrote in his verdict, "Though there were interesting pieces within 'Welcome Back, Jim Gordon' (Bullock and Fish, Gordon becoming what he hates), there was just too much at work here that we've been through before. I get that the title of the episode is even meant to be tongue-in-cheek, alluding to the fact that Gordon's back and nothing's changed - but seriously, this one had a lot of the same beats we'd seen in the fall episodes. And the Fish torture scenes, which seemed to be building up to a great character moment, went nowhere."

The A.V. Club's Kyle Fowle gave the episode a "C" grade and wrote, "To Gotham's credit, 'Welcome Back, Jim Gordon' actually gives the audience a solid payoff, something that was sorely lacking in the conclusion of the Electrocutioner storyline, which boasted a climax as jarring as a glass of cold water to the face–or your mechanized, chest-strapped device. At the very least, this week's episode takes its case of the week and builds to a climax that's serviceable to the storyline and to the characters within it. That's as nice as I can get though as, once again, Gotham shows a complete lack of vision while failing to make its procedural elements compelling."
