= The Blade's Path =

- Gotham episode
- Episode no.: Season 4 Episode 5
- Directed by: Scott White
- Written by: Tze Chun
- Cinematography by: Crescenzo Notarile
- Editing by: Leland Sexton
- Production code: T40.10005
- Original air date: October 19, 2017
- Running time: 43 minutes

Guest appearances
- Marina Benedict as Cherry; Albert M. Chan as Pharmacist

Episode chronology
← Previous "The Demon's Head"	Next → "Hog Day Afternoon"
- Gotham season 4

"The Blade's Path" is the fifth episode of the fourth season and 71st episode overall from the Fox series Gotham. The show is itself based on the characters created by DC Comics set in the Batman mythology. The episode was written by Tze Chun and directed by Scott White. It was first broadcast on October 19, 2017.

In the episode, after Alex Winthrop's funeral, Bruce discovers Ra's al Ghul has a likely possibility to be released from prison and sets to go and kill him himself using the knife. Gordon and Alfred become worried about what Bruce could do and set to find him. Meanwhile, Butch Gilzean's body is dropped from the hospital to a swamp where he is reborn under a new identity, "Solomon Grundy". He is soon discovered by Nygma, who is also suffering from a severe identity crisis. Oswald Cobblepot and Sofia Falcone also meet to discuss business.

The episode received mostly positive reviews, with critics praising Alexander Siddig's and David Mazouz's performances as Ra's and Bruce. However, Penguin's subplot received criticism.

== Plot ==
After being in a coma for six months, Butch Gilzean's (Drew Powell) body is taken out of the hospital in order to make room. Afterward, he is dumped into Slaughter Swamp, where his body is dropped into a lake that also contains toxic chemicals left over from Indian Hill.

Bruce (David Mazouz) decides to use the knife to kill Ra's (Alexander Siddig) as revenge for Alex's death. During Alex's funeral, Alfred (Sean Pertwee) is warned by Gordon (Ben McKenzie) that Ra's has diplomatic immunity and will be released from incarceration. Meanwhile, Barbara (Erin Richards) visits Ra's in Blackgate Penitentiary in an escape attempt but Ra's states that he just wants to say goodbye. When they touch hands through the glass, light passes between the two of them, to Barbara's surprise seemingly giving her an unknown power. She asks him what he did, to which Ra's says she would see very soon.

Back on Slaughter Swamp, Butch suddenly wakes up in a zombie-like state. He wanders around the area to find a group of campers. He attacks the campers with a superhuman resistance and strength. Suffering amnesia, he adopts the name of a nursery rhyme, Solomon Grundy. Nygma (Cory Michael Smith) robs a pharmacy in search of a cure for his mental condition, but the pharmacist (Albert M. Chan) injures Nygma and escapes, calling the police. Making his escape, Nygma literally runs into Grundy.

Bruce arrives at Blackgate and manages to enter Ra's cell, ready to kill him. However, he hesitates and decides to leave only to be ambushed by Ra's and assassins from the League of Shadows posing as guards. They take him to the underground of the penitentiary while Gordon and Alfred investigate upstairs. Ra's tells Bruce that the knife was brought to him for his resurrection, having a vision of him as his heir and he is the only person who can kill him. Gordon and Alfred manage to defeat the guards and reach the room. Ra's begin taunting Bruce, threatening to kill his loved ones in the future, prompting an angry Bruce to finally stab him in the chest. This causes Ra's to age in the pace of a few seconds until becoming a decaying corpse.

In the aftermath, Gordon decides not to report Bruce murdering Ra's. Bruce decides to leave his vigilantism and leaves the suit for Alfred. Meanwhile, pretending that he was his friend before his rebirth, Nygma takes Grundy to a fight club headed by a woman named Cherry (Marina Benedict). Cherry sends Butch to the medic for inspection, where it is revealed that Lee (Morena Baccarin) is secretly working there as the new doctor.

== Production ==
=== Development ===
In September 2017, it was announced that the fifth episode of the season would be titled "The Blade's Path" and was to be written by Tze Chun on his writing debut and directed by Scott White.

=== Casting ===
Camren Bicondova, Jessica Lucas, and Chris Chalk don't appear in the episode as their respective characters. In September 2017, it was announced that the guest cast for the episode would include Kelcy Griffin as Detective Harper, and Marina Benedict as Cherry.

== Reception ==
=== Viewers ===
The episode was watched by 2.75 million viewers with a 0.9/3 share among adults aged 18 to 49. This was on par in viewership from the previous episode, which was watched by 2.75 million viewers with a 0.9/3 in the 18-49 demographics. With these ratings, Gotham ranked first for Fox, fourth on its timeslot, and tenth for the night, behind How to Get Away with Murder, The Good Place, Superstore, Toy Story of Terror!, Scandal, Chicago Fire, It's the Great Pumpkin, Charlie Brown, Will & Grace, and Thursday Night Football.

=== Critical reviews ===
Professional ratings
Review scores
Source	Rating
IGN	7.7
TV Fanatic	5.0/5.0 stars
TV Overmind	4.0/5.0 stars

"A Dark Knight: The Blade's Path" received mostly positive reviews from critics. Matt Fowler of IGN gave the episode a "good" 7.7 out of 10 and wrote in his verdict, "Bruce's endgame (and seemingly final confrontation) with Ra's made for a pretty good central story as Gotham often operates at its best when it's beholden to nothing except the 'Batman' lore it wants to use for its own purposes. If this was the true final stand of Ra's in this iteration of the story, then so be it. He already tried to destroy the city and play head games with Bruce. Done and done. Also, Solomon Grundy was a goofy good time. It will always be odd having Butch, after three seasons, transform into Grundy, but it's working."

Nick Hogan of TV Overmind gave the episode a 4-star rating out of 5, writing "Overall, this was a solid episode of Gotham. It wasn't perfect, but it was fun to explore these different dynamics. And I was definitely excited to find Lee Thompkins back on my TV." Sydney Bucksbaum of The Hollywood Reporter wrote, "Is that really the end of Ra's on Gotham? Or will he resurrect somehow and this is the start of a new kind of reign for him? And what does killing Ra's mean for Bruce? Will he now have to take over Ra's' reign? And what 'gift' did Ra's give to Babs (Erin Richards) before he died? There are so many questions left to be answered!"

Vinnie Mancuso of Collider wrote, "Tonight's episode of Gotham, titled 'The Blade's Path,' was one of those rare Balloonman specials: an entry so beautifully absurd that it transcends the show's regular status of silly fun to become something more, like a child accidentally finger-painting the Mona Lisa. I'm not even sure where to begin, to be honest." Lisa Babick of TV Fanatic gave the series a perfect 5 star rating out of 5, writing "Bruce broke his one rule when Ra's al Ghul pushed him to his limit, and Sofia Falcone tried to weasel her way into Penguin's heart, but the highlight of Gotham Season 4 Episode 5 was when Ed Nygma met the new and improved Butch Gilzean. Is anyone else as excited about this storyline as I am?"
