= Will Janowitz =

American actor (born 1980)

William Janowitz
- Born: May 25, 1980 (age 46); New York City, New York
- Education: University of North Carolina School of the Arts (BFA)
- Occupations: Actor, writer
- Years active: 1999–present

William "Will" Janowitz (born May 25, 1980) is an American actor and writer for film and television. He is best known for playing Meadow Soprano's fiancé, Finn DeTrolio, on The Sopranos, Hymie Weiss on Boardwalk Empire (2012–2013), and Trevor in Bikini Moon (2017).

== Early life and education ==
Janowitz was born on May 25, 1980, in New York City and is a first-generation American. He has Eastern European and Jewish ancestry. His mother, Katherine Sborovy, a writer, was from Bratislava, Slovakia. His father, James Janowitz, an attorney, is from Berlin, Germany. His father's family fled to New York City after their family's window display factory was seized by the Nazis on Kristallnacht. Will is named after his great uncle who perished in the Minsk Ghetto. Janowitz's mother's family were also survivors of the Holocaust and sought refuge in New York City.

Janowitz grew up on the Upper West Side in New York City. He graduated from high school at the Trevor Day School in Manhattan.

After training at the University of North Carolina School of the Arts in 2000, Janowitz began acting professionally.

== Career ==
He worked briefly as Mary-Louise Parker's personal assistant on several film and television projects. One of his earliest film credits was a role in David Gordon Green's George Washington (2000).

In 2002, Janowitz booked a recurring role on The Sopranos as Meadow Soprano's (Jamie-Lynn Sigler) boyfriend, Finn DeTrolio. He would appear in the fifth and sixth seasons of the show, portraying a novice's perspective of the organized crime ring. Janowitz's character notably disclosed the homosexuality of Vito Spatafore (Joe Gannascoli), one of Tony Soprano's (James Gandolfini) best-earning captains.

Janowitz has appeared in various independent features, including Backseat (2005) and Bristol Boys (2006). In 2005, he appeared in Grand Theft Auto: Liberty City Stories as the voice of Donald Love.

In 2009, Janowitz joined the ensemble cast of Ang Lee's Taking Woodstock and wore a blonde wig and mustache to play Chip Monck, the festival's production designer. That same summer, he went to Marietta, Georgia, to play the role of Leo Frank in The People v. Leo Frank (2009). The film explores the life and trial of Leo Frank, an American-born Jew who was lynched in Marietta, Georgia, on August 17, 1915, after raping and murdering a 13-year-old girl who worked in his pencil factory.

He played a comedian in "The Good News" episode of Mad Men in 2010, razzing audience members Don Draper and Lane Pryce. In 2011 he appeared as a green Goblin in Louie C.K.’s television show, Louie, in the episode “Halloween/Ellie”.

From 2012 to 2013, Janowitz portrayed a historically ruthless Chicago mobster, Hymie Weiss, on Boardwalk Empire.

In 2014, Janowitz played the character Alex in the film H., directed by Rania Attieh and Daniel Garcia and set in Troy, NY. The film revolves around the aftermath of an apparent meteor strike. H. premiered at the 71st Venice International Film Festival and went on to play at the 2015 Sundance Film Festival. Janowitz also appeared in the Broad City episode "Destination Wedding". Janowitz played the ghost of a Confederate soldier named Josiah in The Heart, She Holler(2014). He played Chef Christopher in the Deadbeat (2015) episode "Table for Sue".

In the American Experience episode “Murder of a President” (2016), Janowitz depicted Charles J. Guiteau, who shot and killed President James A. Garfield.

In 2016, Janowitz portrayed Steve in the film Little Boxes, which follows a family moving from the city life of Brooklyn to a small town in Washington state. The film had its world premiere at the Tribeca Film Festival in April 2016. He also appeared as the character Ralph in Youth in Oregon which premiered at the 2016 Tribeca Film Festival as well.

On the T.V. series Gotham, Janowitz plays an informant named Wally Clarke. In the episode "Hog Day Afternoon" (2017) Janowtiz gives Gordon (Ben McKenzie) a tip, saying he retrieved pigs from a butcher and left them for a man known as the "Professor".

Janowitz took the role of mentor in the character Tony, a manager of a bowling alley in the coming-of-age story CRSHD (2019). Directed by Emily Cohn, CRSHD premiered at the 2019 Tribeca Film Festival.

In 2019, Janowitz portrayed Mark Rollins in the Chicago P.D. episode “Brotherhood”. He played David Fallon on FBI: Most Wanted in the 2020 episode "Grudge".

Janowitz co-wrote and portrayed a priest in the Chris Pine production Doula (2022).

In the meta-film comedy short Proof of Concept (2023), Janowitz acted alongside Richard Kind. It premiered at the 2023 Tribeca Film Festival.

In 2025, Janowitz earned an Academy Award nomination as one of the producers of the film Train Dreams.

== Filmography ==
=== Film ===
Year	Title	Role	Notes
1999	Terror Firmer	Partier	
2000	George Washington	Railroad Worker	
2004	Press Gang	Derrick	Short
2005	Backseat	Frankie	
2005	David & Layla	Woody Fine	
2006	Bristol Boys	Corey	
2007	Bed Head	Will	Short
2007	Mattie Fresno and the Holoflux Universe	East European Lab Assistant	
2007	Gnome	Gnome	Short
2009	The People v. Leo Frank	Leo Frank	
2009	Taking Woodstock	Chip Monck	
2009	Two Birds	The Other Man	Short
2010	John Sharnhorst	John Sharnhorst	Short
2012	Bottle Poppaz	DJ Lava	Short
2012	Exposed	Alexi Krustonovich	
2012	Ex-Girlfriends	Matt	
2013	B-Side	Evan	
2013	The Volunteer	Joe	
2013	Junkie Doctors	Andersen Stevenson	Short
2014	Google Comes to Collect	Google	Short
2014	H.	Alex	
2015	Lucky and the Long Walk Home	Turkey	Short
2016	Little Boxes	Steve	
2016	Youth in Oregon	Ralph	
2016	Puppy Love	James	Short
2017	Bikini Moon	Trevor	
2017	Troll	Noah	Short
2019	Balk	Rob	Short
2019	Pitcher/Catcher	Valentine	Short
2019	Crshd	Tony	
2020	The Ride	Cole	Short
2022	Doula	The Priest	
2023	Proof of Concept	Eddie Cohen	Short
2026	Lucy Schulman	TBA	Post-production

=== Television ===
Year	Title	Role	Notes
2002	Law & Order	Bill Horton	Episode: "Slaughter"
2002–06	The Sopranos	Finn DeTrolio	Recurring Cast: Seasons 4–6
2004	Law & Order: Criminal Intent	Rico	Episode: "Shrink-Wrapped"
2008	Law & Order: Criminal Intent	Jacob Green	Episode: "Vanishing Act"
2009	Law & Order	Cal	Episode: "Skate or Die"
2010	Mad Men	Comedian	Episode: "The Good News"
2011	Louie	Goblin	Episode: "Halloween/Ellie"
2012–13	Boardwalk Empire	Hymie Weiss	Guest: Season 3, Recurring Cast: Season 4
2013	Inside Amy Schumer	Sam	Episode: "Clown Panties"
2013	Law & Order: Special Victims Unit	Officer Scott Graver	Episode: "Military Justice"
2014	Broad City	Will	Episode: "Destination Wedding"
2014	The Heart, She Holler	Josiah	Episode: "Groaning Amore"
2015	Deadbeat	Chef Christopher	Episode: "Table for Sue"
2016	American Experience	Charles J. Guiteau	Episode: "Murder of a President"
2016	Netflix Presents: The Characters	Jeremiah	Episode: "Paul W. Downs"
2016	The Night Of	Dr. Ross	Episode: "Ordinary Death"
2016	The Daily Show	Doug Bailey	Episode: "Common"
2017	Gotham	Wally Clarke	Episode: "Hog Day Afternoon"
2019	Chicago P.D.	Mark Rollins	Episode: "Brotherhood"
2020	FBI: Most Wanted	David Fallon	Episode: "Grudge"
2024	Law & Order: Organized Crime	Eric Bonner	2 episodes

=== Video Games ===
Year	Title	Role
2005	Grand Theft Auto: Liberty City Stories	Donald Love (voice)
2008	Grand Theft Auto IV	The Crowd of Liberty City (voice)
2008	Midnight Club: Los Angeles	Julian (voice)
