= The Scarecrow (Gotham episode) =

- Gotham episode
- Episode no.: Season 1 Episode 15
- Directed by: Nick Copus
- Written by: Ken Woodruff
- Production code: 4X6665
- Original air date: February 9, 2015

Guest appearances
- David Zayas as Salvatore "Sal" Maroni; Morena Baccarin as Dr. Lee Thompkins; Julian Sands as Dr. Gerald Crane; Charlie Tahan as Jonathan Crane; Dashiell Eaves as Kelly; Babs Olusanmokun as Mace; Eisa Davis as Judith Bartel; Peter Jay Fernandez as Dr. Anderson

Episode chronology
← Previous "The Fearsome Dr. Crane"	Next → "The Blind Fortune Teller"

"The Scarecrow" is the fifteenth episode of the television series Gotham. It premiered on FOX on February 9, 2015 and was written by Ken Woodruff, and directed by Nick Copus. In this episode, Gordon (Ben McKenzie) and Bullock (Donal Logue) continue following Dr. Crane's killing spree.

The episode was watched by 5.63 million viewers and received generally positive reviews. Critics praised the ending as scary but felt the subplots were weak.

== Plot ==
Fish Mooney (Jada Pinkett Smith) has been captured and is locked up in a rowdy prison-like area. Meanwhile, Dr. Gerald Crane (Julian Sands) continues experimenting with his fear toxin. This time he tests it on himself to re-experience his greatest fear: his wife is killed in a fire. Falcone (John Doman) decides to put an end to Cobblepot's (Robin Lord Taylor) debt to Maroni (David Zayas). He meets with him and Maroni agrees to end his feud with Falcone and forswears vengeance on Oswald, as long as he receives the services of a judge in Falcone's pocket. Falcone tells Cobblepot he also has to redecorate the nightclub, as Falcone is giving it to him to run. Falcone reminds Oswald that without cash flow, they lose influence, and without influence, their organization becomes a house of cards.

After receiving information from Nygma (Cory Michael Smith), Gordon (Ben McKenzie) and Bullock (Donal Logue) realize Crane created the toxin after his wife's death, hoping that people use it to overcome their deepest fears. Bruce (David Mazouz) goes on a trip to the forest to challenge himself but runs into difficulties. He's then joined by Alfred (Sean Pertwee), who tells him that he came looking for him, but decided to let him crawl the last hundred yards up the hill on his own, to let Bruce develop his independence. Cobblepot is visited later by Maroni, who tells him that when Falcone dies, Cobblepot will die too.

In a cabin in the woods, Dr. Crane injects his son Jonathan (Charlie Tahan) with a high level of the toxin, causing him to have a breakdown featuring the cabin's scarecrow. Gordon and Bullock locate them, and when Gerald opens fire and proclaims himself without fear, Gordon and Bullock return fire, killing him and taking Jonathan to a hospital. In the prison, Mooney kills Mace, the prisoner's leader, and promises to protect the other prisoners, who, it turns out are having their organs harvested for sale. In the hospital, Gordon is notified by the doctor that because of the high levels of toxins, Jonathan (while he will live) will forever be forced to see his fears permanently. The episode ends as Jonathan is tormented by visions of scarecrows.

== Reception ==
=== Viewers ===
The episode was watched by 5.63 million viewers, with a 1.8 rating among 18-49 adults. With Live+7 DVR viewing factored in, the episode had an overall rating of 8.39 million viewers, and a 3.0 in the 18–49 demographic.

=== Critical reviews ===
Professional ratings
Review scores
Source	Rating
Rotten Tomatoes (Tomatometer)	64%
Rotten Tomatoes (Average Score)	6.0
IGN	7.0
The A.V. Club	C
"GamesRadar"	3/5 stars
Paste Magazine	6.5
TV Fanatic	3.7/5 stars
New York Magazine	2/5 stars

"The Scarecrow" received generally positive reviews. The episode received a rating of 64% with an average score of 6.0 out of 10 on the review aggregator Rotten Tomatoes, with the site's consensus stating: "What should have been an exciting examination into the origins of an infamous villain becomes a tedious and polluted rendering of legendary Batman folklore in 'The Scarecrow'."

Matt Fowler of IGN gave the episode a "good" 7.0 out of 10 and wrote in his verdict, "'The Scarecrow' gave us a freaky bit of Jonathan Crane backstory and a good Bruce/Alfred bonding moment, but the rest either didn't make sense, was boring, or worked to undo and deflate previous set ups."

The A.V. Club's Kyle Fowle gave the episode a "C" grade and wrote, "Week in and week out, I've been saying that the reason Gotham fails so miserably from one episode to the next is because it never commits to a specific tone or genre, and has a haphazard approach to character development. While I think that still holds true, the critique may need a little modification at this point. For a while, Gotham was failing to walk a fine line between being a cartoonish comedy about pre-Batman Gotham, and a police procedural with some gritty, but also fun elements. One episode would see Bullock and Gordon doing the buddy-cop schtick, and the next would see Gordon dealing with his own personal issues or going toe-to-toe with the corruption within the GCPD. With 'The Scarecrow,' the show seems to have more fully committed to its procedural stylings. The wild tonal shifts are still present, but it seems as if the show may have decided what it wants to be."
