= Bristol Boys =

- Film poster
- Directed by: Brandon David
- Written by: Brandon David
- Starring: Thomas Guiry; Will Janowitz; Tammy Trull; Max Casella
- Release dates: November 13, 2006 (Hungary); April 3, 2007 (United States)
- Running time: 90 minutes
- Country: United States
- Language: English
- Budget: $500,000 USD

Bristol Boys is a 2006 film written and directed by Brandon David. Shot in Bristol, Connecticut and Springfield, Massachusetts, the film is based on one of biggest drug busts of Connecticut's Statewide Narcotics Task Force, including the arrest of David's longtime friend Kevin Toolen in 2001. Will Janowitz and Max Casella of The Sopranos fame star in the film, as do Dean Winters and David Zayas from Oz.

== Plot ==
The story revolves around Michael "Little Man" McCarthy and the rise and fall of marijuana dealers from Bristol, Connecticut. "The film is about a group of working-class guys trying to get ahead by selling drugs," said David, "and the value system they try to live by."

=== Inspiration ===
Director/writer Brandon David based the movie on the events leading up to and following a months-long investigation by the Statewide Narcotics Task Force which resulted in the arrest of 21 people from Bristol, Plymouth, Southington, and Thomaston. David's friends Kevin Toolen and Miguel Rivera were arrested in the bust. David says he hoped to write on the experiences of his friends and himself while transporting marijuana with Toolen cross country.

Several aspects of the movie are taken directly from the real life events, such as "Little Man" being ratted out by a trusted friend. "It is a shocking fact that a good friend of Kevin's was a DEA informant," David said, which was another motivation to make the movie. David did take creative license on some realities, such as making "Little Man's" mother addicted to OxyContin and dying of an overdose. Toolen's mother died in 2000 but had been suffering from leukemia. Also, the police informant's death in the movie is fiction. "There was no murder, but if I were the guy that ratted everybody out, I'd be concerned," said David.

David denies the movie is an attack on Bristol. "The biggest message I want to get out is I didn't make a movie about Bristol. I made a movie about something that happened to people I know," he said. However, he openly criticizes Bristol, calling it an "industrial wasteland."
