= 1985 (film) =

2018 film directed by Yen Tan

- Film poster
- Directed by: Yen Tan
- Screenplay by: Yen Tan
- Story by: Yen Tan; HutcH
- Produced by: Ash Christian; HutcH
- Starring: Cory Michael Smith; Virginia Madsen; Michael Chiklis; Aidan Langford; Jamie Chung
- Cinematography: HutcH
- Edited by: Yen Tan; HutcH
- Music by: Curtis Heath
- Production companies: Floren Shieh Productions; MuseLessMime Productions; RainMaker Films; Cranium Entertainment
- Distributed by: Wolfe Releasing; Peccadillo Pictures
- Release date: 9 March 2018 (SXSW)
- Running time: 85 minutes
- Country: United States
- Language: English

1985 is a 2018 American drama film directed by Yen Tan and starring Cory Michael Smith, Virginia Madsen, Michael Chiklis, Aidan Langford, and Jamie Chung. The film is an expansion of an earlier short film of the same name that Tan released in 2016.

== Premise ==
In 1985, advertising agent Adrian Lester returns home to Dallas to visit his conservative family for Christmas after several years of living in New York City. Adrian, a closeted gay man, has come to tell his family goodbye, but does not want to disclose to them that he is dying of AIDS. Adrian's brother Andrew is initially resentful towards Adrian for not visiting in years. During Christmas, Adrian buys his family expensive gifts and travel tickets, much to his father's surprise. Adrian also reconnects with Carly, an old friend of his who has since become a stand-up comedian. She is hurt and leaves him after he rejects her advances, but returns and apologizes. Adrian reveals to her that he's dying of AIDS, and that several of his friends and one of his roommates have also died. He also reveals that he's working in a restaurant to make ends meet, as someone from his advertising firm discovered his sexuality and he was fired for that. Carly tries to encourage him, and makes him promise that he'll call her when his symptoms reach their onset.

During a long talk, Adrian's father Dale admits that he knew Adrian was fired from his job, and that he discovered Adrian in a romantic embrace with another man during a surprise visit. Despite his implied beliefs about homosexuality, Dale does not reveal Adrian's sexuality to anyone else in the family, and offers his support for Adrian if he ever needs anything. Adrian's mother Eileen drops him off at the airport, where she reveals that she, too, knows he's gay. Adrian leaves Andrew a goodbye tape. The film ends with Adrian in the airport preparing to board his plane, while the voiceover of his tape message plays, encouraging Andrew and telling him that there will be both good and bad days ahead, and that Andrew will "find the right people", strongly implying that Andrew is gay.

== Cast ==
- Cory Michael Smith as Adrian Lester
- Virginia Madsen as Eileen
- Michael Chiklis as Dale Lester
- Jamie Chung as Carly
- Aidan Langford as Andrew
- Ryan Piers Williams as Marc
- Bryan Massey as Pastor John

== Production ==
The film is a feature-length adaptation of a short film of the same name that was released in 2016. Writer and director Yen Tan said the basis for the films were his experiences of interacting with people who were living with HIV and AIDS at his first job after graduating from college.

The original short film, which starred Lindsay Pulsipher and Robert Sella, centered on a young man with AIDS preparing to move back in with his estranged mother. Unlike the short film, the feature is shot in black-and-white and in 16 mm. Filming took place from May to June 2017.

== Release ==
The film premiered in March 2018 at SXSW. It subsequently screened at a number of LGBT and general-interest film festivals, including as the opening gala at the 2018 Vancouver Queer Film Festival. The movie's DVD and digital release was in December 2018. It also was released in the United Kingdom by Peccadillo Pictures, and was released in Australia, New Zealand and Germany.

== Reception ==
On review aggregate website Rotten Tomatoes, 1985 has an approval rating of 96% based on 52 reviews. The site's critics consensus reads, "1985 pays tribute to a generation of lost lives with a powerfully made look at how HIV and the social attitudes surrounding homosexuality affect one man's choices."

Glenn Kenny of The New York Times wrote, "Cory Michael Smith’s performance as Adrian is a quiet marvel in a movie that’s superbly acted all around. The film’s intimate consideration of still-enormous issues is intelligent, surprising and emotionally resonant." ABC News also reviewed the film positively, writing, "Most of the scenes are staged between Adrian and one other person, and this decision to draw out the intimacy of the pair in the frame accentuates the poignancy of things not said."

1985 was given multiple prizes like the Grand Jury Prize at the SXSW Texas Competition, the Festival Best Feature at FIRE!! Mostra, the Audience Award and the Student Jury Prize at the Champs-Élysées Film Festival in Paris, the Grand Jury Award and the Best Screenwriting award at the Outfest Los Angeles LGBTQ Film Festival and the awards of: Best Feature Film, Best Writer for Yen Tan, Best Actor for Cory Michael Smith, Best Supporting Actor for Michael Chiklis, Best Supporting Actress for Jamie Chung at the Queen Palm International Film Festival.
