= Albert M. Chan =

Canadian actor

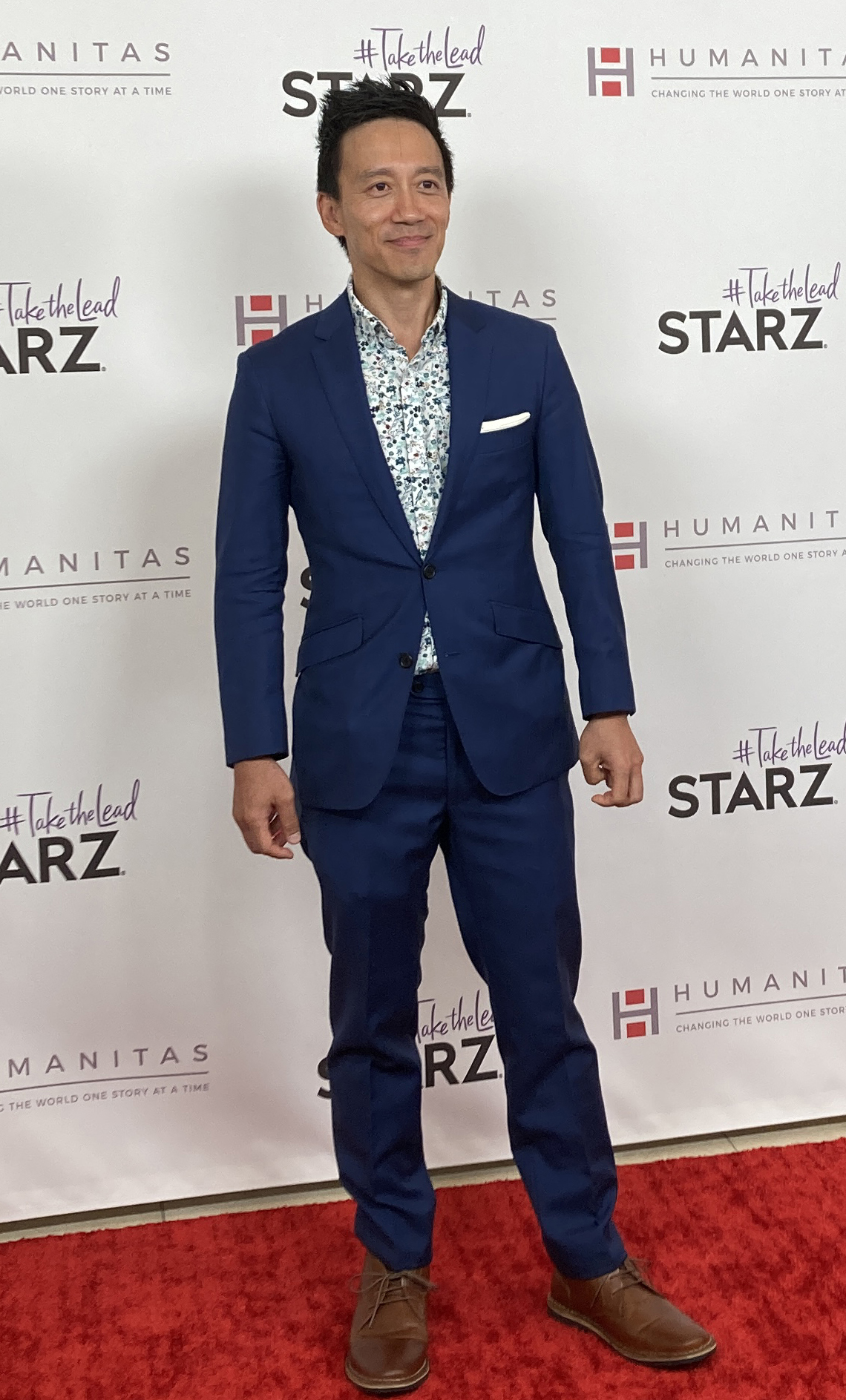
- Albert M. Chan arrives at the Humanitas Prizes Luncheon at The Beverly Hilton on September 9, 2022 to receive his screenwriting trophy for the Humanitas New Voices Fellowship
- Born: Albert Michael Chan; October 1, 1975 (age 51); Toronto, Ontario, Canada
- Occupations: Actor, filmmaker
- Years active: 2004—present
- Website: Official Website of Albert M. Chan

Albert M. Chan (born October 1, 1975) is a Canadian actor and filmmaker based in the United States.

== Background ==
Chan was born in Toronto, Ontario, Canada, and lived in Mississauga, Ontario, Canada. He moved to Boston, Massachusetts in 1997, to attend the Massachusetts Institute of Technology, where he received his Ph.D. in Electrical Engineering.

== Career ==
=== Career development ===
Chan first began his career working on student films, indie films, and theatre in the Boston area while still a student at the Massachusetts Institute of Technology. It took several years before he landed his first major role in 2006, a part in Walt Disney Picture's Underdog, which was released in 2007. He followed up with TV roles that same year in The CW Television Network pilot I'm Paige Wilson and Showtime's Brotherhood.

Also in 2007, Chan took matters into his own hands and wrote, directed, produced, and starred in his own film, Fate Scores, which also featured the acoustic guitar song "It Won't Be Long", written and performed by Chan. In his directorial debut, Chan was recognized by the National Film Board of Canada as second runner-up for Best Canadian Short Film at the Vancouver Asian Film Festival in 2009. Fate Scores premiered at the Wisconsin Film Festival on April 5, 2009, and has since appeared in seven additional film festivals in North America. The film was acquired for distribution in 2010 by Moving Images Distribution (formerly Canadian Filmmakers Distribution West).

In 2008, Chan was cast in a supporting role working alongside Matthew McConaughey and Jennifer Garner in the New Line Cinema romantic comedy Ghosts of Girlfriends Past and also completed filming Every Day, starring Helen Hunt and Liev Schreiber, which opened at the 2010 Tribeca Film Festival.

In 2009, Chan filmed the supporting role of Richard in the indie feature Life of Lemon, starring Dan Lauria, Beth Grant, and Rachel Miner and also had a role on the NBC hit drama Law & Order: Special Victims Unit. In 2010, he was cast in ABC's Body of Proof, and the following year he was cast in Spike Lee's HBO pilot Da Brick.

Chan returned to filmmaking in 2011 when he wrote, directed, executive produced, and starred in his own film, The Commitment, about an interracial gay couple adopting a newborn baby. The film was inspired by an unsuccessful adoption in Chan's actual life. "Those familiar with domestic adoption had told us before we began that the adoption process is truly a roller coaster ride, and now we finally understood what these people meant," Chan explained on the film's official website. "I dealt with the feelings of loss and disappointment the only way I knew how—I wrote a screenplay. Four unsuccessful birthparent matches and one year later, The Commitment went into production. Two weeks after the film wrapped, our beautiful son Andrew was born, the result of our fifth match." The film premiered in Palm Springs on September 22, 2012, and has since won the 2013 National Association of Social Workers Media Award for Best Feature Film (edging out fellow nominees Moonrise Kingdom and What to Expect When You're Expecting (film), the Audience Award for Best Short at the 2013 Desperado LGBT Film Festival (Phoenix, AZ), both the Jury Award and Audience Award for Best LGBT Film at the 2013 SENE Film, Music, & Arts Festival (Providence, RI), a Best LGBT Film nomination at the 2013 Out in the Desert: Tucson's International LGBT Film Festival, Audience Favorite - Short Series at the 2012 Palm Springs Gay and Lesbian Film Festival (shared with Little Ones and Groom's Cake), and Best Supporting Actress - Short Film at the Summer 2012 Asians On Film Festival. The film has screened at over 50 film festivals on six continents.

In 2012, Chan appeared as Roy on the NBC hit comedy series 30 Rock. He also filmed two television movies: Clear History starring Larry David and Jon Hamm and directed by Greg Mottola for HBO, and The Makeover starring Julia Stiles and Camryn Manheim for ABC and the Hallmark Hall of Fame. The Makeover premiered on ABC on January 27, 2013, and Clear History premiered on HBO on August 10, 2013. Also in 2013, Chan was cast Lloyd Chang in his second role on the NBC hit drama Law & Order: Special Victims Unit, opposite special guest star Cybill Shepherd.

In 2014, Chan completed Descendants of the Past, Ancestors of the Future, a film he wrote and directed, starring Golden Globe, Emmy, and Drama Desk nominee Tina Chen, which won Best Screenplay and Best Actress at the 2015 NYC Downtown Short Film Festival. The film, based on the immigration history of Chan's family, was awarded a Puffin Foundation Grant and named a finalist for the Roy W. Dean Film Grant.

In 2016, Chan was cast in the Boston Marathon bombing film Patriots Day starring Mark Wahlberg and Kevin Bacon and also in the final season of the hit HBO series Girls, which aired at the beginning of 2017. That same year, Chan guest starred on the FOX drama Gotham and shot a recurring role as Tony Q on the upcoming TV series Big Dogs.

Chan also wrote and co-directed Welcome to the World in 2017, a dark drama about a troubled man who records a video message for his sister. Chan shot the film in one continuous take with a budget of less than $140. Rachel Pullen of UK Film Review praised Chan's skills as a director, screenwriter, and actor: "Leading man Albert M. Chan... plays an emotionally raw man with a grace and ease that is often only seen within some of the most high end actors... Packs a huge punch... to create such an impact on a viewer in only seven minutes with just one man, a script and a camera certainly speaks volumes of the skills that Chan has as a director, writer and performer." Richard Propes of The Independent Critic gave the film four stars and wrote, "riveting piece of human drama... Chan's performance is deeply moving... lingers in your brain long after the closing credits". Kirk Fernwood of One Film Fan praised the film as "intelligent, inventive, and inspired... Chan does a fantastic job... drawing you in with every word... the finale is a stroke of creative brilliance and artistry". The film has screened at over 50 film festivals on six continents.

In 2019, Chan was cast as a therapist in the Anna Kendrick HBO Max series Love Life, which premiered in 2020. That same year, he scored a role on the hit NBC series New Amsterdam. Also, two of his projects premiered on the same day on Amazon Prime Video: the feature film Big Exit in which Chan plays insurance agent Tim, and the TV series Big Dogs in which Chan has a recurring role as wardrobe stylist Tony Q. The latter also premiered on Tubi.

In 2022, Chan appeared opposite David Hyde Pierce in the HBO Max series Julia. Also, Chan portrayed quirky high school English teacher Mr. Balboni alongside Christina Hendricks and Kunal Nayyar in the feature film The Storied Life of A.J. Fikry, based on Gabrielle Zevin's 2014 New York Times best seller.

Chan is the recipient of a 2022-2023 Humanitas New Voices Fellowship for his feature screenplay Incarnations, given to writers whose work explores the human condition in a nuanced and meaningful way.

In 2024, the feature film Silver Star premiered at Deauville American Film Festival and Denver Film Festival, in which Chan appeared opposite lead actress Grace Van Dien. In December 2024, Chan's sci-fi romance feature screenplay The Verge of Seas achieved The Black List "recommended" status.

=== Other work ===
As a consequence of both his academic and acting careers, Chan has an Erdős–Bacon number of 4. He co-authored a peer-reviewed paper on OFDM, giving him an Erdős number of 3. Chan appeared alongside Kevin Bacon in Patriots Day, giving him a Bacon number of 1.

== Press ==
Chan has been interviewed as an actor and filmmaker on BBC World Service's OS and the Canadian Broadcasting Corporation's national morning radio show The Current. Chan has also been featured in numerous print and on-line articles including a story by The Advocate, an Asian American Risings A-Profiler feature, four Sampan articles, two Bay Windows interviews, an MIT Alumni Association profile, and a Slice of MIT article. He has also appeared as a panelist at a sneak preview of the PBS TV show American Masters: Hollywood Chinese.

== Filmography ==
Year	Title	Role	Notes
2004	Overserved	Wang Long	
2005	Number Two Pencil	Phillip	
2006	Interrogation	Charles Han	
2007	Underdog	Geek Worker	
2007	Brotherhood	Brothel Manager	Episode: "Not Dark Yet 3:5-6"
2007	American Experience	Chinese Prisoner	Episode: "The Living Weapon"
2007	I'm Paige Wilson	Dealer	The CW pilot
2008	Ana's Time	Ken Chuen	
2009	Ghosts of Girlfriends Past	Groomsman Sam	
2009	Law & Order: Special Victims Unit	Banker	1 Episode (Sugar)
2009	Fate Scores	Guitarist	Also director and writer
2010	Every Day	Dr. Lee	
2011	Life of Lemon	Richard	
2011	Body of Proof	Lab Tech	1 Episode (Letting Go)
2011	Da Brick	Tim	HBO pilot
2012	30 Rock	Roy	1 Episode (Alexis Goodlooking and The Case of The Missing Whisky)
2012	The Commitment	Robert	Also Director and Writer
2013	The Makeover	Pearce	
2013	Clear History	Electron Motors Co-Worker	
2013	Law & Order: Special Victims Unit	Lloyd Chang	1 Episode (An American Tragedy)
2014	Descendants of the Past, Ancestors of the Future	Andrew	Also director and writer
2016	Patriots Day	Computer Forensic Tech	
2017	Girls	Ming	1 Episode (All I Ever Wanted)
2017	Welcome to the World	Man	Also co-director and writer
2017	Gotham	Pharmacist	1 Episode (A Dark Knight: The Blade's Path)
2020	New Amsterdam	EEG Tech	1 Episode (Perspectives)
2020	Love Life	Therapist	1 Episode (Bradley Field)
2020	Big Dogs	Tony Q	2 Episodes (Things I've Done, All for None)
2020	Big Exit	Tim	
2022	Julia	Owner	1 Episode (Crepes Suzette)
2022	The Storied Life of A.J. Fikry	Mr. Balboni	
2024	Silver Star	Pharmacist	
