= Hog Day Afternoon (Gotham) =

- Gotham episode
- Episode no.: Season 4 Episode 6
- Directed by: Mark Tonderai
- Written by: Kim Newton
- Cinematography by: Scott Kevan
- Editing by: Sarah C. Reeves
- Production code: T40.10006
- Original air date: October 26, 2017
- Running time: 43 minutes

Guest appearances
- Marina Benedict as Cherry; Michael Cerveris as Lazlo Valentin / Professor Pyg; Will Janowitz as Wally Clarke; Anthony Carrigan as Victor Zsasz

Episode chronology
← Previous "The Blade's Path"	Next → "A Day in the Narrows"
- Gotham season 4

"Hog Day Afternoon" is the sixth episode of the fourth season and 72nd episode overall from the Fox series Gotham. The show is itself based on the characters created by DC Comics set in the Batman mythology. The episode was written by Kim Newton and directed by Mark Tonderai. It was first broadcast on October 26, 2017.

The episode revolves around Gordon and Bullock tracing to a serial killer who has been targeting corrupt police officers. The killer, also known as "Professor", has been targeting the officers and put pig masks on their heads. Gordon confronts the killer and discovers more information regarding Bullock. Meanwhile, Nygma uses Butch for personal gain in the fight club to win money. He also tries to get Lee to help him deal with his problems but he also finds more about her. Also, Cobblepot begins following Sofia as it seems she's hiding something. The episode also marks the live-action debut of Professor Pyg.

The episode received positive reviews from critics, who praised Michael Cerveris' performance as Professor Pyg as well as Nygma's storyline, but Cobblepot's subplot received criticism.

== Plot ==
At the fight club, Nygma (Cory Michael Smith) talks with Lee (Morena Baccarin) for help in order to fix his identity crisis but she angrily refuses to help him following his previous actions. Cobblepot (Robin Lord Taylor) and Sofia (Crystal Reed) meet in order to fully acknowledge each other's partnership. In another part of the city, a police officer investigates a gunshot. While searching the area, he is butchered by a man wearing a pig mask.

Gordon (Ben McKenzie) and Bullock (Donal Logue) investigate the murder, finding the killer put a pig's head on the officer's head. The officer also was a bagman on Cobblepot's payroll. After interrogating Cobblepot, Gordon gets a clue from a man, Wally Clarke (Will Janowitz), who applied for a license, discovering a headless pig in his apartment. Wally states that he just retrieved the pigs from a butchery and left it for a man known as the "Professor". Cobblepot meets for dinner with Sofia but when she fails to show up, he has Zsasz (Anthony Carrigan) to follow her. In the fight club, Grundy (Drew Powell) manages to beat another fighter for money, much to Nygma's delight. Nygma then finds out that Lee is leading a clinic in her apartment to help people.

Gordon and Bullock get a clue from an informant about dirty cops that may be affiliated to the Professor. They find them dead on a bench with their pig masks on but get a lead that a white van left the bodies. Another officer is also kidnapped by the Professor. They follow to a warehouse where they find the officer. However, he has a grenade in his stomach, killing him and knocking Gordon and Bullock out. Gordon wakes up tied to a chair where he is confronted by the Professor (Michael Cerveris). The Professor states that he was once a cop but decided to end the corruption by killing any corrupted officer. The Professor leaves to kill Bullock in another room. Gordon manages to free himself, but the Professor cuts Bullock's throat and escapes.

Cobblepot is told by Zsasz that Sofia seemingly bought an abandoned hospital and was seen meeting with many businessmen. However, she shows him that in fact, she has opened an orphanage and is forgiven for his misstep. Lee, after finding her medicine is running out in the clinic, decides to accept Nygma's money and help him with his identity crisis. She also states that she's only remaining in Gotham because she feels responsible for the Tetch virus. Bullock wakes up and is confronted by Gordon, who tells him he knows that he has been on Cobblepot's payroll. Bullock finally admits he has been on his payroll since the licenses began, saying his debts were the main reasons. Gordon tells him it will stop. The Professor, now dubbed by media as "Professor Pyg", is seen taking care of pigs in an undisclosed area.

== Production ==
=== Development ===
In October 2017, it was announced that the sixth episode of the season would be titled "Hog Day Afternoon" and was to be written by Kim Newton and directed by Mark Tonderai.

=== Casting ===
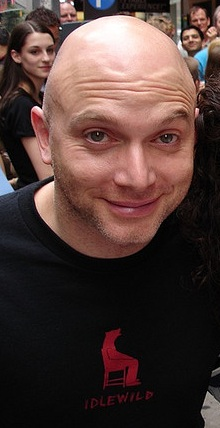
Michael Cerveris guest stars in the episode as Lazlo Valentin / Professor Pyg. The episode is also Pyg's first live-action portrayal.

In September 2017, Michael Cerveris joined the show as Lazlo Valentin / Professor Pyg, in a multi-episode role. Cerveris stated, "Professor Pyg is a brilliant and chameleon-like person who has a highly developed sense of what's right and wrong — it just might not be a sense of right and wrong that corresponds with everybody else's." He also added that, "When they [the writers] had somebody who played Sweeney Todd, they knew the direction they wanted to go... [Broadway fans who don't watch Gotham] might give it a look simply because of that, and find that they have a new favorite show." Donal Logue stated, "We have Michael Cerveris coming in and playing Professor Pyg and he's such an incredibly gifted actor and, as happens a lot, the gentlest and most gifted of artistic souls can play the darkest, creepiest human beings known to literature or film."

David Mazouz, Sean Pertwee, Erin Richards, Camren Bicondova, Jessica Lucas, Chris Chalk, and Alexander Siddig don't appear in the episode as their respective characters. In October 2017, it was announced that the guest cast for the episode would include Anthony Carrigan as Victor Zsasz, Michael Cerveris as Professor Pyg, Marina Benedict as Cherry, and Will Janowitz as Wally Clarke.

== Reception ==
=== Viewers ===
The episode was watched by 2.87 million viewers with a 0.9/3 share among adults aged 18 to 49. This was a 4% increase in viewership from the previous episode, which was watched by 2.75 million viewers with a 0.9/3 in the 18-49 demographics. With these ratings, Gotham ranked second for Fox, behind The Orville, fourth on its timeslot, and tenth for the night, behind How to Get Away with Murder, Great News, Scandal, The Good Place, The Orville, Superstore, Chicago Fire, Will & Grace, Grey's Anatomy, and Thursday Night Football.

=== Critical reviews ===
Professional ratings
Review scores
Source	Rating
IGN	7.3
TV Fanatic	4.5/5.0 stars
TV Overmind	4.5/5.0 stars

"A Dark Knight: Hog Day Afternoon" received positive reviews from critics. Matt Fowler of IGN gave the episode a "good" 7.3 out of 10 and wrote in his verdict, "The first live-action Professor Pyg certainly looked and sounded cool, but the attempt to weave him into the ongoing plot involving the corrupt GCPD only diluted his demented nature and turned him into a drag. From the ashes though came Harvey Bullock's biggest, and saddest, moment in years."

Nick Hogan of TV Overmind gave the episode a 4.5 star rating out of 5, writing "I don't know if this is the best episode of the season, but it's very close (I'm rather fond of the episode that Ben McKenzie directed). There was a compelling villain and it really reminded me of all the reasons I love the show." Sydney Bucksbaum of The Hollywood Reporter wrote, "What does this mean for their friendship and working relationship moving forward? Can Bullock redeem himself? Will Gordon ever forgive him? Either way, Pyg is still on the loose, so Bullock's in danger of him finishing the job unless Gordon can find and arrest the pig-obsessed killer first."

Vinnie Mancuso of Collider wrote, "The episode, which was in fact 'Very Good.' That wondrous title refers to the arrival of Batman rogue Professor Pyg, played with terrifying enthusiasm by two-time Tony-winner Michael Cerveris. Cerveris commits, man. It's the difference between a grown-ass man saying 'oink, oink, little piggy' being hilarious and being horrifying. In the grand Gotham tradition, this character is both at once." Lisa Babick of TV Fanatic gave the series a perfect 5 star rating out of 5, writing "Professor Pyg has arrived, and he's as gruesome as ever. He didn't have a lot of screen time on Gotham Season 4 Episode 6, but when he was on screen, it was creepy as hell. And the most amazing part of his whole performance was when he spared Jim's life because he believed Jim was one of the good guys. I'm not going to go off on another long Jim tangent, but Pyg hasn't been paying attention." Marc Buxton of Den of Geek gave wrote, "Last week I asked, when did Gotham become a guided tour anthology series about the DC Universe? Take a look at this week's episode. We have a debut of a very modern DC villain, a weird Of Mice And Men riff centering on an underground fight club and a budding romance for the Penguin. How do all these diverse aspects fit together? They don't. At all. But for some reason on some batshit strange level, it all still works."
