= The Emerald Atlas =

2011 novel by John Stephens

- First edition cover
- Author: John Stephens
- Illustrator: Grady McFerrin
- Cover artist: Jon Foster; Grady McFerrin
- Genre: Fantasy
- Publisher: Alfred A. Knopf
- Publication date: April 5, 2011
- Publication place: United States
- Pages: 417
- ISBN: 978-0-375-86870-2
- Followed by: The Fire Chronicle

The Emerald Atlas is the first novel of the children's fantasy trilogy The Books of Beginning by John Stephens. The second book, The Fire Chronicle, was released in 2012. The book follows orphan siblings Kate, Michael, and Emma who, following a succession of unsuccessful orphanage dwellings, are transferred to the mansion of Dr. Pym, where they find a magical book that grants the power of moving through time. Upon traveling to the past, they happen across a witch who has enslaved the nearby town, Cambridge Falls, in an attempt to find the book, known as the Atlas, that the children possess. As the siblings encounter various magical races in an effort to dispel the witch, Kate discovers that she is intrinsically bound to the Atlas, and that the three children are subject to an ancient prophecy.

== Plot ==
Kate, Emma, and Michael are siblings shifted from one orphanage to another over their lifetimes. Kate, the eldest, remembers that, ten years ago on Christmas Eve, her mother had made her promise to protect her siblings, and in turn promised the family's reunion. After their rejection by a prospective adoptive mother, the children's current residence (called the Edgar Allan Poe Home for Incorrigible and Hopeless Orphans) sends them to a mansion situated in Cambridge Falls. There, they are introduced to its owner, Dr. Stanislaus Pym, and explore the house. In the basement, a door appears before them, and they discover an emerald-colored book containing no text. When an old photograph is touched to a page of the open book, the children are teleported to the date and location on which the photograph was taken. There, the children observe a witch, titled the Countess, vowing to kill a child every week until the enslaved fathers of the children find what she seeks. The Countess notices the three orphans and calls upon her grotesque henchmen, designated Screechers, to capture them. Kate and Emma escape, but Michael is accidentally left behind. His sisters return to save him, but lose the book (the eponymous 'Emerald Atlas'). In escape, they are hunted by wolves; meet someone named Gabriel; and enter a subterranean maze, where Kate and Michael are captured by Dwarves. There, they discover a fifteen-years-younger Dr. Pym, with whom they recover the Emerald Atlas. Upon finding it, Kate is drawn into an earlier time, where she again meets Dr. Pym, and thence returns to the time she most-recently left. Emma, having tarried with Gabriel to repel the Countess's followers, is shot with a poisonous arrow, but is saved by Gabriel's wisewoman, Granny Peet. Once healed, Emma, backed by the wisewoman, sways the townsfolk into war against the Countess. After their victory, the witch herself remains to be conquered, and holds the imprisoned children on a boat. Kate, now 'chosen' by the Atlas, can travel to any time while in possession of it; but in exchange for the local children's lives, surrenders it. The Countess seizes the book; but is punished by her master, the Dire Magnus, who reveals that Kate and her siblings are the rightful owners of the Atlas and the two other Books of Beginning until, upon the completion of a prophecy, he claims it. After Kate and Dr. Pym rescue the local siblings, she and her siblings return to their own time, where Kate is approached by the Countess. Using the Atlas, Kate drags the Countess into Rhakotis during its conquest by Alexander the Great. In plea, the Countess tells Kate that her mother and father are captives of the Dire Magnus, as bait to lure the siblings into retrieving the Books of Beginning (a trio of volumes enabling command over reality, of which the Atlas is the first) in exchange for their parents’ release. Kate then leaves her in Rhakotis and returns to her own time, where Dr. Pym explains the Books.

== Characters ==
Kate- The oldest of the protagonists and the rightful owner of the Emerald Atlas, which allows her to travel through time and space. She is the only protagonist that truly remembers her mother and father. Her mother bequeathed a heart-shaped locket to her when she was young before they left ten years ago.

Michael- The second oldest of the protagonists. His father gave him a book about dwarfs (The Dwarf Omnibus by G. G. Greenleaf) when he was young and since then, Michael has been fascinated with them. Somehow, his glasses always seem to end up in the toilet.

Emma- The youngest of the protagonists. She is very headstrong and has a short temper. According to her orphanage file, she has been in a documented 23 fights with other children and has won all of them.

The Countess- An evil witch who serves the Dire Magnus. She held the children of Cambridge Falls hostage to force their fathers to help her find the Books of Beginning. She is later dumped in the past by Kate.

The Dire Magnus- The main antagonist of the story. He is in search of the Books of Beginning.

Dr. Stanislaus Pym- A wizard who knew Kate, Michael and Emma's parents and bade them go into hiding. He helps the children discover the Books of Beginning and how to use them.

Gabriel- Emma's best friend who helps them on their journey.

== Critical reception ==
Reception was mixed to positive, with critics praising the narrative complexity and fantasy scope, but criticizing how much of the material was derivative of other popular fantasy books, such as those by Tolkien, Pullman, Rowling, Snicket, and Lewis. Kirkus Reviews wrote positively that the main characters have a "likable voice" and the "elaborate story doesn't feel overcomplicated." The Guardian gave a lukewarm review, saying that while it is "bright and energetic and has some exciting set pieces," it possesses an "everything-including-the-kitchen-sink approach to children's fantasy that it can't quite marshal into overall coherence." Additionally it wrote "children will spot so many bits from other children's fantasies that it could almost be a game," and concluded by saying the novel "threaten[s] magic without ever quite delivering." The New York Times said "Stephens spins a tightly paced, engaging yarn, even if his prose can be lurchingly expository."
