= The Black Reckoning =

Novel

First edition (publ. Knopf)

The Black Reckoning is the third novel of the children's fantasy trilogy The Books of Beginning by John Stephens. The narrative focuses on siblings Kate, Michael, and Emma as they race to find the Book of Death before the primary antagonist Dire Magnus. The book was released in 2015, two years after the sequel.

== Reception ==
Critical reception for the book was positive. Booklist's Maggie Reagan stated that the novel was both "action-packed and introspective", adding that it had a "startling, sometimes somber conclusion." A reviewer from Kirkus Reviews thought that the novel was satisfying and contained the "realistic, requisite heartbreak that comes with saying goodbye." Anita L. Burkam, writing for The Horn Book Magazine, felt that there was a lot going on in the novel, but Stephens managed to masterfully pull it off.

== Audiobook ==
An audiobook, narrated by Jim Dale, was released by Listening Library in 2015. A reviewer from AudioFile stated that Dale's "timbre has a bright, crisp quality that is immediately engaging." In School Library Journal, Alice Davidson said that the narrator's "ability to create unique character voices is extraordinary", adding that his narration of Willy the Giant was one of his best. Karen Cruze of Booklist thought that Dale's emphasis on the pride, doubts, and trauma of the three siblings makes "the ending of their quest essential for listeners."
