= Life of Lemon =

- Directed by: Randy Kent
- Written by: Barry Kneller
- Starring: Rachel Miner; Beth Grant; Mimi Kennedy; Dan Lauria
- Production company: Tigerstorm
- Distributed by: FilmWorks Entertainment Inc.
- Release date: October 18, 2011 (DVD)
- Running time: 100 minutes
- Country: United States
- Language: English

Life of Lemon is a 2011 drama film. It stars Barry Kneller, Rachel Miner, Dan Lauria and Beth Grant. It is directed by Randy Kent and written by Barry Kneller.

== Cast ==
- Barry Kneller as Lemon
- Rachel Miner as Esther
- Beth Grant as Phyllis
- Dan Lauria as Arthur
- Mimi Kennedy as Louise Phillips
- John Farley as Jimmy
- Todd Sherry as LJ
- Rahvaunia as Cindy
- Tom Ohmer as Peter Cardale
