= Electrocutioner =

Comic book character

- The original Electrocutioner in Who's Who: The Definitive Directory of the DC Universe #7 (September 1985). Art by Dave Ross (penciller) and Klaus Janson (inker).

Publication information
- Publisher: DC Comics
- First appearance: Buchinsky: Batman #331 (January 1981); Second Electrocutioner: Detective Comics #626 (February 1991); Lester Buchinsky: Detective Comics #644 (May 1992)
- Created by: Buchinsky: Marv Wolfman (writer); Michael Fleisher (writer); Irv Novick (artist); Second Electrocutioner: Marv Wolfman (writer); Jim Aparo (artist); Lester Buchinsky: Chuck Dixon (writer); Tom Lyle (artist); Scott Hanna (artist)

In-story information
- Alter ego: First Electrocutioner: Buchinsky (first name unknown); Second Electrocutioner: Unknown; Third Electrocutioner: Lester Buchinsky
- Species: Human
- Team affiliations: Lester Buchinsky: Suicide Squad; Secret Society of Super Villains
- Abilities: Electric shocks via suit; Weapon proficiency

The Electrocutioner is an alias used by three fictional characters appearing in American comic books published by DC Comics, all minor enemies of the superhero Batman.

== Publication history ==
The original Electrocutioner (known only as Buchinsky) first appeared in Batman #331 (January 1981) and was created by writers Marv Wolfman and Michael Fleisher and artist Irv Novick.

The second Electrocutioner first appeared in Detective Comics #626 (February 1991) and was created by Wolfman and artist Jim Aparo.

Lester Buchinsky, the third Electrocutioner, first appeared in Detective Comics #644 (May 1992) and was created by writer Chuck Dixon and artists Tom Lyle and Scott Hanna.

== Fictional character biography ==
=== Buchinsky ===
Buchinsky (first name unknown) is a self-appointed executioner of criminals in Gotham City who uses an electrically charged suit. Electrocutioner initially appears as an enemy of Batman.

Electrocutioner later goes to Manhattan. He encounters two muggers in Central Park and attacks them with lethal doses of electricity from his gauntlets. Vigilante, a fellow vigilante, breaks into Charles McDade's limousine and kills him. That evening, Vigilante learns that Electrocutioner is back in town and is targeting the same criminal element as him. Electrocutioner is eventually killed by Vigilante.

S.T.A.R. Labs opens a portal to Limbo in Operation Zeppelin, which allows Electrocutioner and other deceased criminals to return to Earth. When Operation Zeppelin's creator Jeffrey Simon disappears, a rescue party travels through the portal, only to be captured by the villains. A demon impersonating Etrigan the Demon offers the villains a way out through another portal, which in actuality sends them to Hell.

=== Second Electrocutioner ===
The second Electrocutioner used a red costume rigged to generate a lethal electrical shock against criminals (including Cannon and Saber), and ran afoul of Batman, who disapproved of his extreme justice. His real name was never revealed.

=== Lester Buchinsky ===
Lester Buchinsky is the brother of the original Electrocutioner. Initially fighting for justice just like his brother, he later became a criminal and a mercenary. For a time, Electrocutioner is frequently seen in the employ of Blüdhaven crime boss Blockbuster. In Infinite Crisis, Lester appears as a member of the Secret Society of Super Villains. In 52, Electrocutioner appears as a member of the Suicide Squad.

In the Rise and Fall storyline, Green Arrow is hunting down Electrocutioner and the associates of Prometheus, who devastated Star City in Justice League: Cry for Justice. He is close to killing Electrocutioner when Black Canary stops him. Although Electrocutioner is defeated and injured by Speedy, Green Arrow's arrival convinces Speedy that killing is not the answer, resulting in Electrocutioner being taken into custody. However, Roy Harper breaks into the jail and kills Electrocutioner despite Green Arrow's protests.

Electrocutioner was resurrected following The New 52 continuity reboot.

== Skills and equipment ==
All three Electrocutioners wear a special costume lined with built-in circuitry that allows them to project bolts of electricity for either stunning or killing their targets. They also have expertise in using various weapons.

== In other media ==
=== Television ===
- The Lester Buchinsky incarnation of the Electrocutioner makes non-speaking appearances in Justice League Unlimited. This version is a member of Gorilla Grodd's Secret Society.
- An original incarnation of the Electrocutioner based on the first iteration of the character appears in Gotham, portrayed by Christopher Heyerdahl. This version is Jack Buchinsky, a sociopathic inmate in Arkham Asylum charged with murder who experiments on other inmates with electroconvulsive therapy and initially goes by the alias "Jack Gruber".

=== Film ===
- An unidentified Electrocutioner appears in Batman: Bad Blood, voiced by Robin Atkin Downes. This version works for Talia al Ghul before he is killed by Heretic.
- The Lester Buchinsky incarnation of the Electrocutioner appears in Justice League: Crisis on Infinite Earths.

=== Video games ===
- An unidentified Electrocutioner appears as a boss in Batman: The Video Game. This version wields an electric sword-arm capable of firing arcing high-voltage projectiles and works for the Joker.
- The Lester Buchinsky incarnation of the Electrocutioner appears as a character summon in Scribblenauts Unmasked: A DC Comics Adventure.
- The Lester Buchinsky incarnation of the Electrocutioner appears in Batman: Arkham Origins, voiced by Steve Blum. This version is a professional assassin. He is hired by the Joker to kill Batman, who easily defeats Electrocutioner and later tracks him to the Joker and the other assassins' location. In retaliation, the Joker kills Electrocutioner. Following his death, Batman takes Electrocutioner's shock gloves for his own use.
- The Lester Buchinsky incarnation of the Electrocutioner appears in Lego Batman: Legacy of the Dark Knight via the "Mayhem Mode". This version is a member of Task Force X.

=== Miscellaneous ===
An unidentified Electrocutioner appears in the Batman: Arkham Knight prequel comic. This version claims to be an underling of Lester Buchinsky, having acquired several of his prototypes and modified them using Wayne Industries technology. Following the events of Batman: Arkham City, this Electrocutioner attacks Batman, who promptly defeats him and leaves him to be apprehended. However, the Arkham Knight finds Electrocutioner before the police and fatally shoots him.

== See also ==
- List of Batman family enemies
