= John Stephens (TV producer) =

American television producer, screenwriter and director

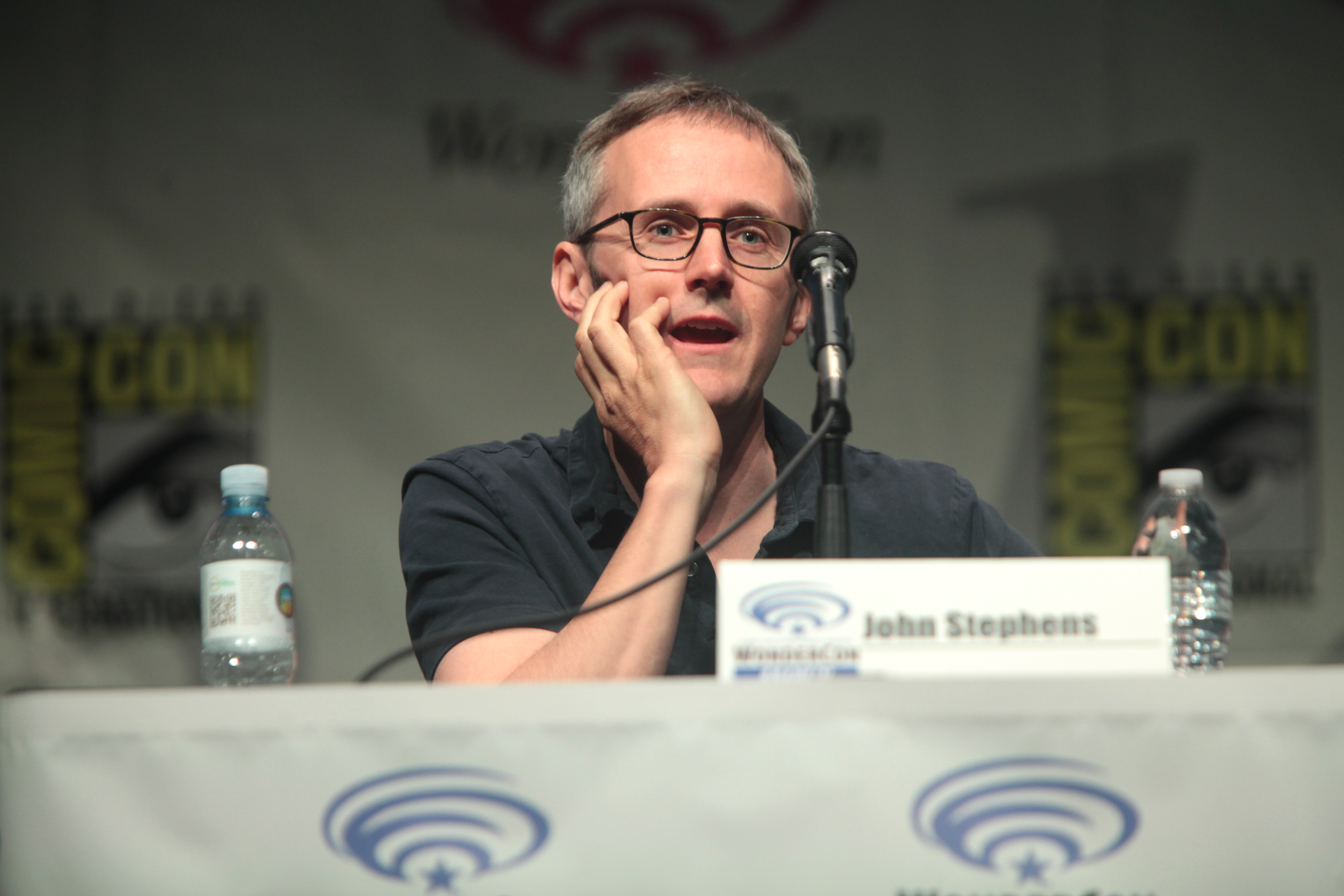
- John Stephens at WonderCon 2015
- Education: Pomona College
- Occupations: Television producer, screenwriter, director
- Years active: 2001–present
- Notable work: The O.C. Gilmore Girls; Gotham

John Stephens is an American television producer, screenwriter and director best known for his work on The O.C., Gilmore Girls and Gotham.

== Early life ==
Stephens attended Pomona College, graduating in 1994.

== Career ==
Stephens is credited as the producer of twenty-five episodes of the drama series The O.C., and supervising producer for an additional three episodes. He has written twelve episodes and directed one – the only directing role credited to his name.

He has co-produced six episodes of dramedy series Gilmore Girls and written eight episodes, and is credited as executive story producer for one episode and story editor for a number of other episodes.

In June, 2008, it was revealed that he had been hired to be executive producer of Gossip Girl. He said, "I was a big fan of Gossip Girl – probably embarrassingly big for a 36-year-old man – so that, and the prospect of working with Stephanie and Josh again, meant I probably would have worked on the show for free. It was a real bonus when they offered to pay me." It was also revealed that under the deal Stephens would develop new shows for Warner Bros. Television.

He is the author of the children's fantasy series The Books of Beginning, the first one called The Emerald Atlas, the second The Fire Chronicle and the third The Black Reckoning.
