= Cory Michael Smith =

American actor

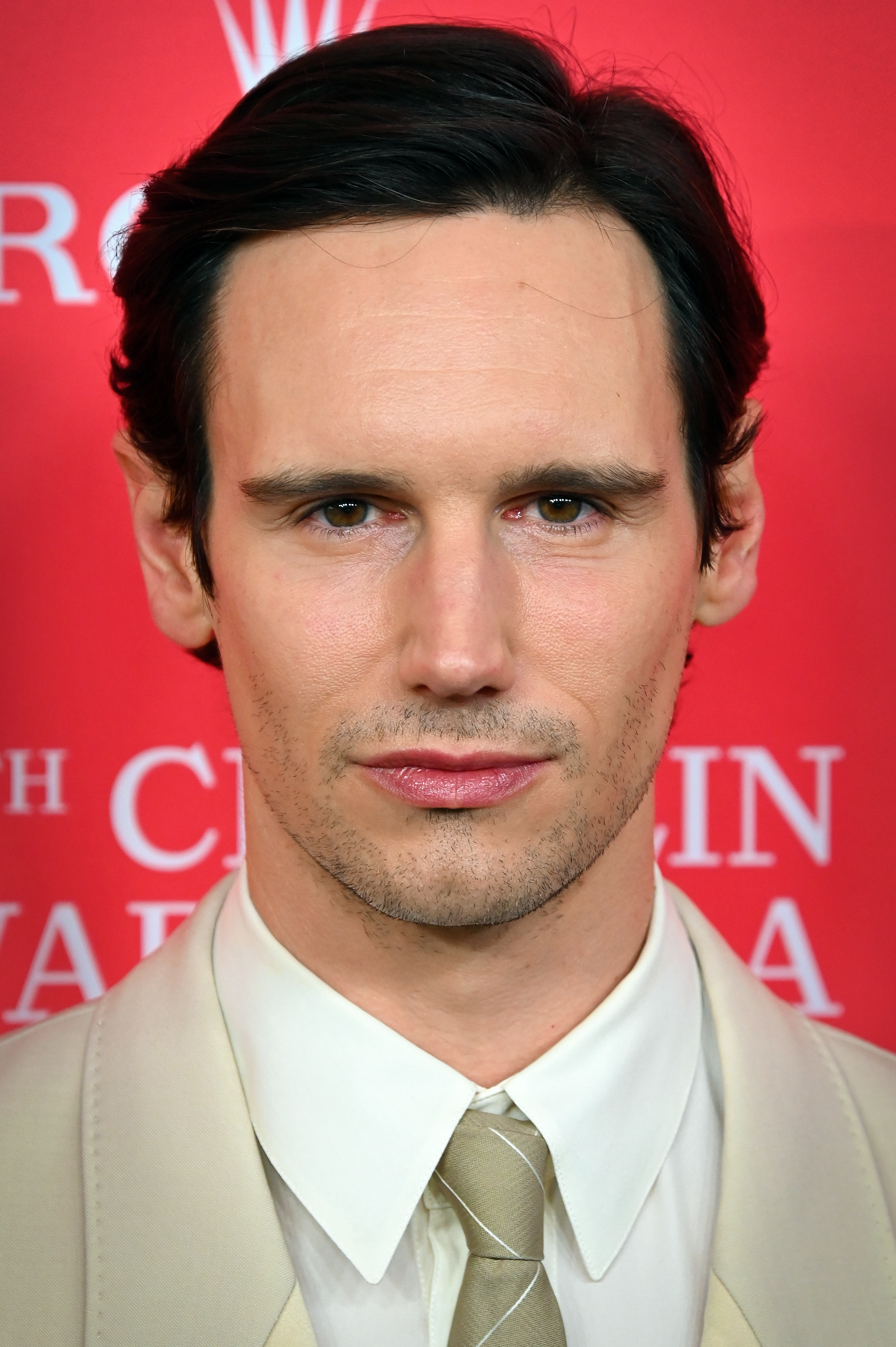
- Smith in 2025
- Born: November 14, 1983 (age 43); Columbus, Ohio, U.S.
- Education: Otterbein University
- Occupation: Actor
- Years active: 2009–present
- Parents: David R. Smith; Theresa Smith (Fagan)

Cory Michael Smith (born November 14, 1983) is an American actor and producer. He appeared in 2013 in Breakfast at Tiffany's on Broadway, which starred Emilia Clarke. Smith is most well known for his role as The Riddler in the Fox series Gotham (2014–2019). He has appeared in several of Todd Haynes's films, including Carol (2015), Wonderstruck (2017), and May December (2023). Additional film roles include 1985 and First Man (both 2018), and Saturday Night (2024).

== Early life and education ==
Cory Michael Smith was born on November 14, 1983 in Columbus, Ohio, where he grew up. He graduated from Hilliard Darby High School in 2005. He had aspirations ranging from becoming a concert pianist to a lawyer.

While at Otterbein University, he was cast in such plays as The Scene, The Caucasian Chalk Circle, Who's Afraid of Virginia Woolf?, and Tartuffe.

== Career ==
From 2009 until early 2012 Smith performed in various regional theatre productions for the likes of New York Stage and Film. In 2011, he was seen in the New York City premiere of The Shaggs: Philosophy of the World at Playwrights Horizons. He starred in The Fantasticks at both Barrington Stage Company and The Repertory Theatre of St. Louis. He was also seen in Edith Can Shoot Things and Hit Them.

Smith made his Broadway debut in Breakfast at Tiffany's in 2013. In the same theatre season, he also starred Off-Broadway in both the U.S. premiere of Cock a.k.a. The Cockfight Play by Mike Bartlett and The Whale by Samuel D. Hunter, which had its world premiere at Denver Center for the Performing Arts with the New York premiere at Playwrights Horizons.

His first feature film was Camp X-Ray, which premiered at the 2014 Sundance Film Festival in January. He appeared in a short horror movie, Dog Food, co-starring Amanda Seyfried, which premiered at the 2014 South by Southwest . Smith also appeared in the HBO mini-series Olive Kitteridge in 2014 and the Todd Haynes film Carol (2015).

Smith in 2018 at the First Man premiere.

In 2014 he began appearing in the TV series Gotham as Edward Nygma.

"What I love about [the character's history] is how diverse it is in terms of how the character is portrayed, in terms of his appearance, the different costumes and hair color," Smith says. "Sometimes it's incredibly ostentatious, other times it's almost professional, or regal. Sometimes, he's a showman, sometimes he's a nerd."

— Smith, on playing Edward Nygma (2015)

In 2017, Smith appeared in a supporting role in Todd Haynes' film Wonderstruck.

In 2018, Smith starred in his first leading role, as an AIDS patient in the independent drama 1985. In July 2018 he narrated an episode of The New York Times Modern Love Podcast, for which he read Kalle Oskari Mattila's essay about catfishing.

He appeared in a supporting role in the 2023 drama May December, which had its premiere at the 2023 Cannes Film Festival. The film marked Smith's third collaboration with director Todd Haynes. In 2024, Smith portrayed Chevy Chase in Jason Reitman's ensemble comedy Saturday Night.

In September 2024, it was announced he had been cast in a supporting role in Norwegian filmmaker Joachim Trier's upcoming film Sentimental Value. The film had its premiere at the 2025 Cannes Film Festival. In June 2025, it was announced that Smith would have his first major leading film role in Jeremy Saulnier's upcoming thriller Slayground, which will be produced by A24.

In 2026, it was announced that he had been cast starring opposite Scarlett Johansson, in Ari Aster's upcoming film Scapegoat.

== Personal life ==
In a March 2018 interview, Smith stated that he is queer.

== Acting credits ==
=== Film ===
Year	Title	Role	Notes
2014	Camp X-Ray	Pvt. Bergen	
2014	Dog Food	Declan Moore	Short film
2015	Carol	Tommy Tucker	
2017	Wonderstruck	Walter	
2018	1985	Adrian Lester	
2018	First Man	Roger B. Chaffee	
2021	The Same Storm	Jeremy Salt	
2022	Call Jane	Dean	
2023	May December	Georgie "George" Atherton	
2023	Incomplete	Narrator	Short film
2024	Saturday Night	Chevy Chase	
2025	Sentimental Value	Sam	
2026	The Sun Never Sets	Chuck	Also producer
2027	Slayground	Michael Chaplain Graves	Post-production
TBA	Famous		Post-production

=== Television ===
Year	Title	Role	Notes
2014	Olive Kitteridge	Dr. Kevin Coulson	Episode: "Incoming Tide"; Nominated — Critics' Choice Television Award for Best Supporting Actor in a Movie/Miniseries
2014–2019	Gotham	Edward Nygma / Riddler	Main role; 100 episodes Nominated — Teen Choice Award for Choice TV Villain
2020	Utopia	Thomas Christie	Main role; 8 episodes
2023	Transatlantic	Varian Fry	Main role; Miniseries; 7 episodes
2024	Law & Order	George Shavers	Episode: "Truth and Consequences"
2025	Mountainhead	Venis "Ven" Parish	Television film

=== Theater ===
Year	Title	Role	Venue	Notes
2011	The Shaggs: Philosophy of the World	Kyle	Playwrights Horizons	Off-Broadway
2012	Cock	John	The Duke on 42nd Street	Off-Broadway
2012	The Whale	Elder Thomas	Playwrights Horizons	Off-Broadway
2013	Breakfast at Tiffany's	Fred / Narrator	Cort Theatre	Broadway
2013	Bright Star	Billy Cane	Powerhouse Theater	
2017	Assassins	Lee Harvey Oswald	New York City Center	Off-Broadway

== Awards and nominations ==
Year	Award	Category	Work	Result	ref
2015	Critics' Choice Television Awards	Best Supporting Actor in a Movie/Miniseries	Olive Kitteridge	Nominated	
2017	Teen Choice Awards	Choice TV: Villain	Gotham	Nominated	
2018	Queen Palm International Film Festival	Best Actor in a Feature Film	1985	Won	
