= List of Gotham episodes =

Gotham is an American superhero crime-drama television series developed by Bruno Heller, based on characters appearing in and published by DC Comics in their Batman franchise, primarily those of James Gordon and Bruce Wayne. The series stars Ben McKenzie and David Mazouz respectively as the young Gordon and Wayne, while Heller executive produces along with Danny Cannon, who also directed the pilot. As originally conceived, the series would have served as a straightforward story of Gordon's early days at the Gotham City Police Department.

During the course of the series, 100 episodes of Gotham aired over five seasons, between September 22, 2014, and April 25, 2019.

== Series overview ==
Season	Episodes	Originally released		Rank	Avg. viewers (in millions)
Season	Episodes	First released	Last released	Rank	Avg. viewers (in millions)
1	22	September 22, 2014	May 4, 2015	68	7.56
2	22	September 21, 2015	May 23, 2016	89	5.37
3	22	September 19, 2016	June 5, 2017	100	4.52
4	22	September 21, 2017	May 17, 2018	129	3.69
5	12	January 3, 2019	April 25, 2019	125	3.68

== Episodes ==
=== Season 1 (2014–15) ===
No. overall	No. in season	Title	Directed by	Written by	Original release date	Prod. code	US viewers (millions)
1	1	"Pilot"	Danny Cannon	Bruno Heller	September 22, 2014	276072	8.21
2	2	"Selina Kyle"	Danny Cannon	Bruno Heller	September 29, 2014	4X6652	7.45
3	3	"The Balloonman"	Dermott Downs	John Stephens	October 6, 2014	4X6653	6.36
4	4	"Arkham"	TJ Scott	Ken Woodruff	October 13, 2014	4X6654	6.39
5	5	"Viper"	Tim Hunter	Rebecca Perry Cutter	October 20, 2014	4X6655	6.09
6	6	"Spirit of the Goat"	TJ Scott	Ben Edlund	October 27, 2014	4X6656	5.89
7	7	"Penguin's Umbrella"	Rob Bailey	Bruno Heller	November 3, 2014	4X6657	6.63
8	8	"The Mask"	Paul Edwards	John Stephens	November 10, 2014	4X6658	6.35
9	9	"Harvey Dent"	Karen Gaviola	Ken Woodruff	November 17, 2014	4X6659	6.49
10	10	"Lovecraft"	Guy Ferland	Rebecca Dameron	November 24, 2014	4X6660	6.05
11	11	"Rogues' Gallery"	Oz Scott	Sue Chung	January 5, 2015	4X6661	7.06
12	12	"What the Little Bird Told Him"	Eagle Egilsson	Ben Edlund	January 19, 2015	4X6662	6.50
13	13	"Welcome Back, Jim Gordon"	Wendey Stanzler	Megan Mostyn-Brown	January 26, 2015	4X6663	6.04
14	14	"The Fearsome Dr. Crane"	John Behring	John Stephens	February 2, 2015	4X6664	5.79
15	15	"The Scarecrow"	Nick Copus	Ken Woodruff	February 9, 2015	4X6665	5.63
16	16	"The Blind Fortune Teller"	Jeffrey Hunt	Bruno Heller	February 16, 2015	4X6666	6.19
17	17	"Red Hood"	Nathan Hope	Danny Cannon	February 23, 2015	4X6667	6.53
18	18	"Everyone Has a Cobblepot"	Bill Eagles	Megan Mostyn-Brown	March 2, 2015	4X6668	6.10
19	19	"Beasts of Prey"	Eagle Egilsson	Ken Woodruff	April 13, 2015	4X6669	4.50
20	20	"Under the Knife"	TJ Scott	John Stephens	April 20, 2015	4X6670	4.44
21	21	"The Anvil or the Hammer"	Paul Edwards	Jordan Harper	April 27, 2015	4X6671	4.58
22	22	"All Happy Families Are Alike"	Danny Cannon	Bruno Heller	May 4, 2015	4X6672	4.93

=== Season 2 (2015–16) ===
No. overall	No. in season	Title	Directed by	Written by	Original release date	Prod. code	U.S. viewers (millions)
Rise of the Villains
23	1	"Damned If You Do..."	Danny Cannon	Bruno Heller	September 21, 2015	4X6201	4.57
24	2	"Knock, Knock"	Rob Bailey	Ken Woodruff	September 28, 2015	4X6202	4.65
25	3	"The Last Laugh"	Eagle Egilsson	John Stephens	October 5, 2015	4X6203	4.33
26	4	"Strike Force"	TJ Scott	Danny Cannon	October 12, 2015	4X6204	4.17
27	5	"Scarification"	Bill Eagles	Jordan Harper	October 19, 2015	4X6205	4.19
28	6	"By Fire"	TJ Scott	Rebecca Perry Cutter	October 26, 2015	4X6206	4.32
29	7	"Mommy's Little Monster"	Kenneth Fink	Robert Hull	November 2, 2015	4X6207	4.27
30	8	"Tonight's the Night"	Jeffrey Hunt	Jim Barnes	November 9, 2015	4X6208	4.11
31	9	"A Bitter Pill to Swallow"	Louis Shaw Milito	Megan Mostyn-Brown	November 16, 2015	4X6209	4.35
32	10	"The Son of Gotham"	Rob Bailey	John Stephens	November 23, 2015	4X6210	4.00
33	11	"Worse Than a Crime"	Jeffrey Hunt	Bruno Heller	November 30, 2015	4X6211	4.51
Wrath of the Villains
34	12	"Mr. Freeze"	Nick Copus	Ken Woodruff	February 29, 2016	4X6212	4.12
35	13	"A Dead Man Feels No Cold"	Eagle Egilsson	Seth Boston	March 7, 2016	4X6213	4.54
36	14	"This Ball of Mud and Meanness"	John Behring	Jordan Harper	March 14, 2016	4X6214	4.01
37	15	"Mad Grey Dawn"	Nick Copus	Robert Hull	March 21, 2016	4X6215	3.89
38	16	"Prisoners"	Scott White	Danny Cannon	March 28, 2016	4X6216	3.82
39	17	"Into the Woods"	Oz Scott	Rebecca Perry Cutter	April 11, 2016	4X6217	3.71
40	18	"Pinewood"	John Stephens	Robert Hull & Megan Mostyn-Brown	April 18, 2016	4X6218	3.72
41	19	"Azrael"	Larysa Kondracki	Jim Barnes & Ken Woodruff	May 2, 2016	4X6219	3.59
42	20	"Unleashed"	Paul Edwards	Danny Cannon	May 9, 2016	4X6220	3.67
43	21	"A Legion of Horribles"	Rob Bailey	Jordan Harper	May 16, 2016	4X6221	3.84
44	22	"Transference"	Eagle Egilsson	Bruno Heller	May 23, 2016	4X6222	3.62

=== Season 3 (2016–17) ===
No. overall	No. in season	Title	Directed by	Written by	Original release date	Prod. code	US viewers (millions)
Mad City
45	1	"Better to Reign in Hell..."	Danny Cannon	John Stephens	September 19, 2016	T13.19901	3.90
46	2	"Burn the Witch"	Danny Cannon	Ken Woodruff	September 26, 2016	T13.19902	3.54
47	3	"Look into My Eyes"	Rob Bailey	Danny Cannon	October 3, 2016	T13.19903	3.19
48	4	"New Day Rising"	Eagle Egilsson	Robert Hull	October 10, 2016	T13.19904	3.42
49	5	"Anything for You"	TJ Scott	Denise Thé	October 17, 2016	T13.19905	3.32
50	6	"Follow the White Rabbit"	Nathan Hope	Steven Lilien & Bryan Wynbrandt	October 24, 2016	T13.19906	3.48
51	7	"Red Queen"	Scott White	Megan Mostyn-Brown	October 31, 2016	T13.19907	3.16
52	8	"Blood Rush"	Rob Bailey	Tze Chun	November 7, 2016	T13.19908	3.52
53	9	"The Executioner"	John Behring	Ken Woodruff	November 14, 2016	T13.19909	3.63
54	10	"Time Bomb"	Hanelle M. Culpepper	Robert Hull	November 21, 2016	T13.19910	3.44
55	11	"Beware the Green-Eyed Monster"	Danny Cannon	John Stephens	November 28, 2016	T13.19911	3.37
56	12	"Ghosts"	Eagle Egilsson	Danny Cannon	January 16, 2017	T13.19912	3.69
57	13	"Smile Like You Mean It"	Olatunde Osunsanmi	Steven Lilien & Bryan Wynbrandt	January 23, 2017	T13.19913	3.60
58	14	"The Gentle Art of Making Enemies"	Louis Shaw Milito	Seth Boston	January 30, 2017	T13.19914	3.46
Heroes Rise
59	15	"How the Riddler Got His Name"	TJ Scott	Megan Mostyn-Brown	April 24, 2017	T13.19915	2.99
60	16	"These Delicate and Dark Obsessions"	Ben McKenzie	Robert Hull	May 1, 2017	T13.19916	3.02
61	17	"The Primal Riddle"	Maja Vrvilo	Steven Lilien & Bryan Wynbrandt	May 8, 2017	T13.19917	3.03
62	18	"Light the Wick"	Mark Tonderai	Tze Chun	May 15, 2017	T13.19918	2.98
63	19	"All Will Be Judged"	John Behring	Ken Woodruff	May 22, 2017	T13.19919	2.92
64	20	"Pretty Hate Machine"	Danny Cannon	Steven Lilien & Bryan Wynbrandt	May 29, 2017	T13.19920	3.03
65	21	"Destiny Calling"	Nathan Hope	Danny Cannon	June 5, 2017	T13.19921	3.17
66	22	"Heavydirtysoul"	Rob Bailey	Robert Hull	June 5, 2017	T13.19922	3.03

=== Season 4 (2017–18) ===
No. overall	No. in season	Title	Directed by	Written by	Original release date	Prod. code	US viewers (millions)
A Dark Knight
67	1	"Pax Penguina"	Danny Cannon	John Stephens	September 21, 2017	T40.10001	3.21
68	2	"The Fear Reaper"	Louis Shaw Milito	Danny Cannon	September 28, 2017	T40.10002	2.87
69	3	"They Who Hide Behind Masks"	Mark Tonderai	Steven Lilien & Bryan Wynbrandt	October 5, 2017	T40.10003	2.92
70	4	"The Demon's Head"	Kenneth Fink	Ben McKenzie	October 12, 2017	T40.10004	2.75
71	5	"The Blade's Path"	Scott White	Tze Chun	October 19, 2017	T40.10005	2.75
72	6	"Hog Day Afternoon"	Mark Tonderai	Kim Newton	October 26, 2017	T40.10006	2.87
73	7	"A Day in the Narrows"	John Behring	Peter Blake	November 2, 2017	T40.10007	2.75
74	8	"Stop Hitting Yourself"	Rob Bailey	Charlie Huston	November 9, 2017	T40.10008	2.70
75	9	"Let Them Eat Pie"	Nathan Hope	Iturri Sosa	November 16, 2017	T40.10009	2.62
76	10	"Things That Go Boom"	Louis Shaw Milito	Steven Lilien & Bryan Wynbrandt	November 30, 2017	T40.10010	2.59
77	11	"Queen Takes Knight"	Danny Cannon	John Stephens	December 7, 2017	T40.10011	2.53
78	12	"Pieces of a Broken Mirror"	Hanelle M. Culpepper	Danny Cannon	March 1, 2018	T40.10012	2.57
79	13	"A Beautiful Darkness"	John Stephens	Tze Chun	March 8, 2018	T40.10013	2.41
80	14	"Reunion"	Annabelle K. Frost	Peter Blake	March 15, 2018	T40.10014	2.55
81	15	"The Sinking Ship The Grand Applause"	Nick Copus	Seth Boston	March 22, 2018	T40.10015	2.47
82	16	"One of My Three Soups"	Ben McKenzie	Charlie Huston	March 29, 2018	T40.10016	2.39
83	17	"Mandatory Brunch Meeting"	Maja Vrvilo	Steven Lilien & Bryan Wynbrandt	April 5, 2018	T40.10017	2.53
84	18	"That's Entertainment"	Nick Copus	Danny Cannon	April 12, 2018	T40.10018	2.37
85	19	"To Our Deaths and Beyond"	Scott White	Peter Blake & Iturri Sosa	April 19, 2018	T40.10019	2.18
86	20	"That Old Corpse"	Louis Shaw Milito	Charlie Huston	May 3, 2018	T40.10020	1.94
87	21	"One Bad Day"	Rob Bailey	Tze Chun	May 10, 2018	T40.10021	2.21
88	22	"No Man's Land"	Nathan Hope	John Stephens & Seth Boston	May 17, 2018	T40.10022	2.20

=== Season 5 (2019) ===
No. overall	No. in season	Title	Directed by	Written by	Original release date	Prod. code	US viewers (millions)
Legend of the Dark Knight
89	1	"Year Zero"	Danny Cannon	John Stephens	January 3, 2019	T40.10051	2.54
90	2	"Trespassers"	Louis Shaw Milito	Danny Cannon	January 10, 2019	T40.10052	2.38
91	3	"Penguin, Our Hero"	Rob Bailey	Tze Chun	January 17, 2019	T40.10053	2.36
92	4	"Ruin"	Nathan Hope	James Stoteraux & Chad Fiveash	January 24, 2019	T40.10054	2.35
93	5	"Pena Dura"	Mark Tonderai	Iturri Sosa	January 31, 2019	T40.10055	2.34
94	6	"13 Stitches"	Ben McKenzie	Seth Boston	February 14, 2019	T40.10056	2.28
95	7	"Ace Chemicals"	John Stephens	Tze Chun	February 21, 2019	T40.10057	2.13
96	8	"Nothing's Shocking"	Kenneth Fink	Seth Boston	February 28, 2019	T40.10061	2.22
97	9	"The Trial of Jim Gordon"	Erin Richards	Ben McKenzie	March 7, 2019	T40.10062	2.04
98	10	"I Am Bane"	Kenneth Fink	James Stoteraux & Chad Fiveash	March 21, 2019	T40.10058	2.17
99	11	"They Did What?"	Carol Banker	Tze Chun	April 18, 2019	T40.10059	2.02
100	12	"The Beginning..."	Rob Bailey	John Stephens	April 25, 2019	T40.10060	2.19

== Ratings ==
Gotham : U.S. viewers per episode (millions)
Audience measurement performed by Nielsen Media Research
