= Gotham season 4 =

Gotham
- Season 4
- Home media cover art
- Starring: Ben McKenzie; Donal Logue; David Mazouz; Morena Baccarin; Sean Pertwee; Robin Lord Taylor; Erin Richards; Camren Bicondova; Cory Michael Smith; Jessica Lucas; Chris Chalk; Drew Powell; Crystal Reed; Alexander Siddig
- No. of episodes: 22

Release
- Original network: Fox
- Original release: September 21, 2017 – May 17, 2018

Season chronology
- ← Previous; Season 3 Next → Season 5

The fourth season of the American television series Gotham, based on characters from DC Comics related to the Batman franchise, revolves around the characters of James "Jim" Gordon and Bruce Wayne. The season is produced by Primrose Hill Productions, DC Entertainment, and Warner Bros. Television, with Bruno Heller, Danny Cannon, and John Stephens serving as executive producers. The season was inspired and adapted elements from the comic book storylines of Batman: Year One, Batman: The Long Halloween, and Batman: No Man's Land. The subtitle for the season is A Dark Knight.

The season was ordered in May 2017, and production began the following month. Ben McKenzie stars as Gordon, alongside Donal Logue, David Mazouz, Morena Baccarin, Sean Pertwee, Robin Lord Taylor, Erin Richards, Camren Bicondova, Cory Michael Smith, Jessica Lucas, Chris Chalk, Drew Powell, Crystal Reed and Alexander Siddig. The fourth season premiered on September 21, 2017, on Fox, while the second half premiered on March 1, 2018. The season concluded on May 17, 2018.

The season received positive reviews from critics and audiences, who cited the character development, writing and action sequences as highlights of the season, with some calling it the best season yet. The premiere was watched by 3.21 million viewers with a 1.0 in the 18–49 demo, which was a 17% decline from the previous season premiere but on par with last season's average. Despite remaining with consistent ratings throughout the first half of the season, the second half experienced new series lows in the spring and being in danger of cancellation. Despite the ratings drop, Fox renewed the show for a fifth and final season on May 13, 2018.

== Premise ==
Crime in Gotham has been reined in by Penguin, who has issued a law in the underworld that licenses must be obtained before any criminal activity. However, things turn out for the improve when Batman ends the empire of Carmine Falcone; his daughter Sofia arrives in Gotham with the intent of rebuilding her family empire. At the same time, Riddler escapes his icy prison and allies with Lee, who has become leader of the Narrows. Serving as their enforcer is an amnesiac resurrected Butch, who now goes by the name Solomon Grundy.

During the second half of the season, Joker breaks out of Arkham Asylum with the Mad Hatter and the Scarecrow, hatching a plot to plunge Gotham City into anarchy. Although he is ultimately killed, he manages to drive his twin brother Jeremiah Valeska insane by exposing him to Scarecrow's chemical gas. Jeremiah forms an alliance with the immortal Ra's al Ghul to threaten the city and push Bruce Wayne into fulfilling his destiny as "Gotham's Dark Knight".

== Cast and characters ==
=== Main ===
- David Mazouz as Bruce Wayne / Batman
- Ben McKenzie as James "Jim" Gordon
- Donal Logue as Harvey Bullock
- Morena Baccarin as Leslie "Lee" Thompkins
- Sean Pertwee as Alfred Pennyworth
- Robin Lord Taylor as Oswald Cobblepot / Penguin
- Erin Richards as Barbara Kean
- Camren Bicondova as Selina Kyle
- Cory Michael Smith as Edward Nygma / Riddler
- Jessica Lucas as Tabitha Galavan / Tigress
- Chris Chalk as Lucius Fox
- Drew Powell as Butch Gilzean / Cyrus Gold / Solomon Grundy
- Crystal Reed as Sofia Falcone
- Alexander Siddig as Ra's al Ghul

=== Recurring ===
- Anthony Carrigan as Victor Zsasz
- Maggie Geha and Peyton List as Ivy "Pamela" Pepper / Poison Ivy
- Andrew Sellon as Arthur Penn
- Charlie Tahan and David W. Thompson as Jonathan Crane / Scarecrow
- Kelcy Griffin as Detective Vanessa Harper
- Nathan Darrow as Victor Fries / Mr. Freeze
- Marina Benedict as Cherry
- Michael Cerveris as Lazlo Valentin / Professor Pyg
- Camila Perez and Michelle Veintimilla as Bridgit Pike / Firefly
- Christopher Convery as Martin
- Cameron Monaghan as Jerome and Jeremiah Valeska
- Benedict Samuel as Jervis Tetch / Mad Hatter
- J.W. Cortes as Detective Carlos Alvarez

=== Guest ===
- Michael Maize as Grady Harris
- Damian Young as Warden Reed
- Nico Bustamante as Orphan
- Michael Buscemi as Merton
- Larry Pine as Mayor Burke
- John Doman as Carmine Falcone
- Ilana Becker as Myrtle Jenkins
- Dakin Matthews as Niles Winthrop
- Benjamin Stockham as Alex Winthrop
- Owen Harn as The Hunter
- Anthony Rodriguez as Anubis
- Albert M. Chan as Pharmacist
- Will Janowitz as Wally Clarke
- Gordon Winarick as Tommy Elliot
- Samia Finnerty as Grace Blomdhal
- Tommy Nelson as Brant Jones
- Kyle Vincent Terry as Headhunter
- Stu "Large" Riley as Sampson
- Thomas Lyons as Griffin Krank
- Chris Perfetti as Cosmo Krank
- Francesca Root-Dodson as Ecco
- B. D. Wong as Hugo Strange
- Alison Fraser as Gertrude Haverstock

== Episodes ==
No. overall	No. in season	Title	Directed by	Written by	Original release date	Prod. code	US viewers (millions)
A Dark Knight
67	1	"Pax Penguina"	Danny Cannon	John Stephens	September 21, 2017	T40.10001	3.21
In the aftermath of the Tetch virus incident, Penguin has regained control of Gotham's underworld and begun issuing "Licenses of Misconduct", allowing criminals to commit "legal crimes," though not approved by Gordon and Bruce. Selina and a reluctant Tabitha agree to a license. A group of unlicensed criminals led by Merton and Grady Harris decide to defeat Penguin, releasing Jonathan Crane from Arkham to help them produce his father's fear toxin. Knowing that Gordon cannot help, Bruce decides to fight the licenses himself. The night Penguin opens the Iceberg Lounge, the Harrises are captured before they can attack the party but, when Penguin decides to execute them, Ivy turns on him and cuts the power. Merton uses the fear toxin on Penguin before Gordon shows up and takes him into custody. The toxin makes Penguin see an escaped Nygma. Bruce steals the list of licensed criminals, but is then found on the scene of a robbery by the GCPD, bank robbers. Grady, who escaped from the party, returns to Crane's house, but discovers Jonathan has adopted a new persona, calling himself "Scarecrow" and spraying Grady with fear gas.
68	2	"The Fear Reaper"	Louis Shaw Milito	Danny Cannon	September 28, 2017	T40.10002	2.87
Gordon releases Bruce from custody. Penguin gives the former 24 hours to apprehend Crane to prove the GCPD is still efficient. With no support from the other cops, even Bullock, Gordon walks into Arkham and fights off dozens of inmates influenced by the fear toxin and eventually gets dosed himself. He walks into a hallucination and sees a dying Lee, but successfully overcomes his fear and uses water to nullify the inmates' reaction to the toxin, forcing Crane to run. Penguin mocks the GCPD and offers the policemen a spot on his payroll. Gordon seeks Falcone's help to defeat Penguin. Meanwhile, Selina and Tabitha meet with a resurrected Barbara, who asks them to join her new arms business, onto which Penguin later forces a license. After being convinced of Barbara's sincerity, Tabitha and Selina decide to join. Ivy drinks a combination of potions and begins mutating. After Bruce almost gets killed during his vigilantism, Fox, who seems to be aware of his activities, provides him with a "Prototype Suit," making him faster and more resilient.
69	3	"They Who Hide Behind Masks"	Mark Tonderai	Steven Lilien & Bryan Wynbrandt	October 5, 2017	T40.10003	2.92
In Arabia, AD 125, a deceased warrior is taken from the battlefield and placed into a healing pool known as the Lazarus Pit; once revived, the future Ra's is tasked by his master to find his future heir and given a ceremonial knife. In modern-day Gotham, the knife is sold at auction by Penguin; Bruce, playing a wealthy spoiled brat, outbids Barbara for it. She is revealed to have been revived by Ra's and tasked with retrieving the knife. She sends Selina to convince Bruce to yield it, but to no avail. Gordon visits Carmine, who declines his request, revealing his imminent demise. His daughter Sofia, however, comes to Gotham to help Gordon after they share a kiss. Ed is stolen from the Lounge by one of Penguin's employees, Myrtle Jenkins, who was a former classmate of Ed's and is a current follower. Ed finds that his brain has suffered, such that he is not able to answer even children's riddles. Penguin has Myrtle killed to make an example and Ed wanders around the city, angry to learn that Penguin is in control again.
70	4	"The Demon's Head"	Kenneth Fink	Ben McKenzie	October 12, 2017	T40.10004	2.75
Bruce has antiquist Niles Winthrop and his grandson, Alex, study the knife. Ra's later kills Niles, forcing Alex to escape with the knife. Bruce and Gordon find Alex and are attacked by Ra's' psychotic enforcers; Bruce and Alex escape the scene. Ra's visits the GCPD as a Nanda Parbat official before Alfred arrives and tells Gordon about the previous activities of Ra's, who escapes. Alex and Bruce return to Niles' museum, where the former has hidden the knife. After recovering it, the enforcers attack them just as Gordon arrives and fights them off. Ra's holds Alex hostage, demanding the knife, which Bruce deems too important. An impressed Ra's kills Alex and, as part of his scheme, allows Gordon to arrest him. Meanwhile, Cobblepot threatens Sofia against contemplating a takeover. He uses her to trap and execute Falcone loyalists, completely trusting Sofia, who tells Jim that it was all part of her plan. Ed spends hours trying to make petty riddles to defy Cobblepot, who convinces Ed that he is no longer the Riddler and spares his life for more humiliation.
71	5	"The Blade's Path"	Scott White	Tze Chun	October 19, 2017	T40.10005	2.75
Following Alex's funeral and learning that Ra's has applied for diplomatic immunity, Bruce takes the knife and vows to kill him at Blackgate. Ra's grants Barbara an unknown mystical power and says goodbye. Upon arriving, Bruce is ambushed by Ra's, and the League posed as COs. When Alfred reports him missing to Gordon, they arrive at Blackgate and subdue the League. Ra's states that he is cursed with immortality and provokes Bruce into stabbing him with the knife, breaking the curse and rendering him a decayed corpse. Bruce suspends his vigilantism and Alfred keeps the suit until he can move on. Meanwhile, Butch's body is dumped in waters polluted by Indian Hill's chemical waste; he is revived with no memory, primitive language, pale skin, and superhuman strength, assuming the name "Solomon Grundy". He encounters and befriends Nygma, who takes him to a wrestling ring where Lee is working as the medic. Sofia attempts to level with Cobblepot and the two begin bonding.
72	6	"Hog Day Afternoon"	Mark Tonderai	Kim Newton	October 26, 2017	T40.10006	2.87
A man wearing a pig's head begins killing police officers acting as Cobblepot's bagmen. Deducing that the killer intends to fight corruption, Gordon and Bullock find the last target but are too late to prevent his death, leading to the duo's capture. Gordon frees himself before the killer cuts Bullock's throat to facilitate his escape. Gordon tells Bullock that he knows the latter has also been on Cobblepot's payroll, demanding him to cease it. "Professor Pyg" is revealed to have larger-scale plans. Meanwhile, Cobblepot suspects Sofia's intentions and confronts her, but is deceived again when he learns that she has been constructing an orphanage. Nygma begins making money using Gilzean, trying to hire Thompkins to restore his genius. After running out of medicine in her private clinic, she accepts Nygma's offer.
73	7	"A Day in the Narrows"	John Behring	Peter Blake	November 2, 2017	T40.10007	2.75
Pyg kidnaps three officers. Cobblepot and his temporary enforcer Headhunter ally with the GCPD to take down Pyg against the advice of Gordon and Sofia, who warns Cobblepot of the bad publicity should the alliance fail. They find one officer murdered and the second, Fisoli, critically wounded. While Fisoli is taken away in an ambulance, the alliance traps Pyg in an abandoned courthouse with the third officer, Patel. However, it is a trap and Bullock accidentally shoots Patel. Gordon saves them alone, reclaiming the GCPD's good publicity and ruining Cobblepot's. Penguin stabs Headhunter in rage while Fisoli revealed to be Pyg in disguise, escapes to enact further plans. The GCPD stops recognizing the Licenses. Meanwhile, during a fundraiser, Bruce is met by Grace Blomdhal, his former classmate. He is also re-introduced to a now friendly Tommy Elliot and Brant, who acts arrogantly around Bruce. As an act of vengeance, Bruce excludes Brant while partying at a nightclub he impulsively purchased and develops a romance with Blomdhal. To make amends with Barbara, Selina and Tabitha steal from a biker gang and are accepted by the former.
74	8	"Stop Hitting Yourself"	Rob Bailey	Charlie Huston	November 9, 2017	T40.10008	2.70
Barbara, Selina, and Tabitha are dispatched by Cobblepot to kidnap Nygma, after learning of his popularity mocking Cobblepot in the Narrows. Cobblepot also dispatches Bridgit to kill them in case they fail. Arriving, Barbara is distracted by Lee and Tabitha recognizes Gilzean. After Tabitha defeats Gilzean, who begins remembering, in a fight for Nygma, Bridgit arrives, but Lee incapacitates her; she also becomes the new leader of the fights after Cherry is killed by Barbara. Meanwhile, Gordon is offered a promotion to be the new Captain of Gotham Central, arranged by Sofia. Although initially hesitant, he takes the position when Bullock's bitterness and shame lead to him missing out on a police ceremony. Cobblepot takes advantage of a mentally unstable orphan named Martin and psychologically manipulates him into his protégé. Gordon ends his partnership with Sofia.
75	9	"Let Them Eat Pie"	Nathan Hope	Iturri Sosa	November 16, 2017	T40.10009	2.62
In a plot to launch an attack on Sofia's orphanage, Pyg kills several homeless people and cooks their insides, stuffing them into pies. His base of operations is exposed by the GCPD, which Captain Gordon goes to investigate but is ambushed and captured by Pyg. When dinner at the orphanage rounds up several of the rich and powerful, including Cobblepot, Pyg launches his plan into motion, torturing the rich into cannibalism by way of eating the pies. Cobblepot's friendship with Sofia is ruined when Martin, acting as an insider for Cobblepot, tells him of her interactions with Gordon, confirming his suspicions.
76	10	"Things That Go Boom"	Louis Shaw Milito	Steven Lilien & Bryan Wynbrandt	November 30, 2017	T40.10010	2.59
Gordon visits the Pyg in Arkham Asylum after Fox deduces that the Pyg has undergone numerous facial surgeries. Fox learns that he was a serial killer named Lazlo Valentin. The Pyg later breaks out of Arkham. In the Narrows, Thompkins and Nygma are faced with a rival mobster, Sampson, who challenges her leadership. After Sampson ransacks Thompkins' clinic, she poisons his drink and offers an antidote on the condition that he resign from power in the Narrows. Thompkins also learns that Nygma's side effects from being frozen have been worn off; Nygma begins having hallucinations of his dual personality, the Riddler. Cobblepot confronts Sofia and has her tortured by the Dentist, one of Cobblepot's assets. As part of an intricate plan, Sofia flees but is kidnapped by Barbara, Tabitha, and Selina. The four ally and, after Zsasz blows up Barbara's safe house, they use Martin as leverage against Cobblepot, while Gordon learns of Sofia's intentions to use the GCPD against Cobblepot via Gordon's promotion. The two factions meet under a bridge and Cobblepot fakes Martin's death in a car bombing to force Sofia to retreat, declaring war.
77	11	"Queen Takes Knight"	Danny Cannon	John Stephens	December 7, 2017	T40.10011	2.53
While Nygma is haunted by his alternate Riddler persona, Tabitha kidnaps and repeatedly bludgeons Grundy in an attempt to have him remember her. She ultimately gives up, but Grundy soon awakens, regaining higher speech and remembering his past life as Butch Gilzean. Bruce's arrogance prompts Alfred to fight him in hand-to-hand combat when he refuses to go on vacation away from his new friends. A conceited Bruce fires Alfred from service and forces him to resign as his legal guardian. Pyg becomes involved in a conspiracy with Sofia to assassinate her father Carmine and blame Cobblepot for the hit. After Carmine's funeral, Sofia manipulates Gordon into arresting Cobblepot for Martin's supposed murder, and Zsasz revealed to also be working for Sofia, sells him out to the GCPD. Sofia kills Pyg and reveals her true motive was not to take over Gotham but to allow Gordon to live with his guilt over killing her brother Mario. Bullock resigns from the GCPD. Incarcerated at Arkham Asylum, Cobblepot meets Jerome Valeska.
78	12	"Pieces of a Broken Mirror"	Hanelle M. Culpepper	Danny Cannon	March 1, 2018	T40.10012	2.57
Nygma's dual personality as the Riddler takes control of him and, with his intentions to overthrow Lee as the head of the Narrows, he hires Griffin Krank to assassinate her while she gives a speech to unite the Narrows. However, the assassination attempt fails, inciting a bombing instead. Alfred and Detective Gordon help rescue those in the bombing; Alfred is hailed as a hero at a local diner, while Gordon pursues Krank. Ivy reappears in a newly mutated adult body, created by a combination of drugs and toxins. She enters the recently rebuilt Sirens nightclub and reveals her powers to Selina as the two allies. Alfred learns that Tiffany, a waitress from the diner, has been killed by her abusive boyfriend, Rooney. Although Alfred is framed for the murder, he tracks down Rooney and, alongside Bullock, who is now working as a bartender, has Rooney arrested. Nygma confronts Krank, not knowing his Riddler persona hired him. Gordon, who was led to Krank by Barbara earlier, arrives and shoots Krank dead just as he reveals the Riddler's involvement; Nygma lies to Gordon, keeping his involvement a secret.
79	13	"A Beautiful Darkness"	John Stephens	Tze Chun	March 8, 2018	T40.10013	2.41
Ivy begins to investigate "Project M," which is being conducted at Wayne Enterprises and involves the experimentation on and deaths of several plants, much to her anger. After she murders a Wayne Enterprises employee, a horrified Selina abandons her. Ivy then visits Bruce and poisons him, causing him to hallucinate his closest friends and allies along with a mysterious cloaked figure. Simultaneously, Ivy hypnotizes Lucius and forces him to take her to the laboratory where Project M is being conducted. She collects a sample of the Lazarus water that is being used in the experiments before escaping. Gordon tracks them down and rescues Lucius before collecting the antidote and rescuing Bruce, who believes that he has seen his future. Ivy also uses the Lazarus water to create a new flower that can immediately kill someone upon contact with the petals. Meanwhile, Jerome pesters Oswald in Arkham and subjects him to numerous humiliating tasks to turn him insane. Upon learning that Jerome intends to escape and wreak havoc on Gotham, Oswald decides to use that to escape.
80	14	"Reunion"	Annabelle K. Frost	Peter Blake	March 15, 2018	T40.10014	2.55
Nygma begins to contemplate suicide to kill his dual personality but opts to return to Arkham instead. However, Oswald reappears and reveals to him that he specifically wrote his letter so that his dual personality would read it and bring Nygma back to Arkham. Meanwhile, Ivy begins to exact her revenge on those who have hurt her, beginning with Bullock for the death of her father years ago. Gordon takes Bullock to the GCPD and learns that Ivy intends to attack the annual Wayne Foundation dinner. Bruce attempts to convince Alfred to return, but the latter turns him down; he later attends the dinner as Bruce unsuccessfully attempts to reach out to him. However, Ivy attacks the dinner and kills several people before the GCPD arrives. Bruce dresses in vigilante attire and rescues the few remaining people there; Alfred decides to return to Wayne Manor. Following this, Selina destroys the Lazarus water to prevent Ivy from making more plants. Simultaneously, Sofia forcibly takes control of the Narrows and has Lee thrown into the streets, leading Gordon to turn to Bullock for help and decide to take Sofia down.
81	15	"The Sinking Ship The Grand Applause"	Nick Copus	Seth Boston	March 22, 2018	T40.10015	2.47
Working with Oswald again, Nygma rescues Martin and delivers him to safety while Oswald escapes from Arkham. Together, they attempt to convince Lee to help them, but Nygma is captured by Grundy and returned to the Sirens, who take him to Sofia. However, Oswald successfully breaks into Sofia's mansion and follows Nygma to the pier, rescuing him. Simultaneously, Sofia attempts to kill Oswald, but Gordon and Bullock work together to protect him before surviving an attack from her, which leads to Lee shooting Sofia in the head, putting her into a coma. Gordon plans on confessing to the GCPD, but Bullock forces him to live with the guilt instead. Meanwhile, Bruce and Selina reconcile with one another and Barbara becomes affected by Ra's al Ghul's powers.
82	16	"One of My Three Soups"	Ben McKenzie	Charlie Huston	March 29, 2018	T40.10016	2.39
Jervis Tetch breaks himself, Jerome, Scarecrow, and eighty other inmates out of Arkham before hypnotizing hundreds of Gotham citizens to stand on rooftops, forcing Gordon into an impossible situation. Though Tetch programs his victims to jump if they are told not to, Gordon finds a loophole and tricks the hypnotized people into saving each other, while apprehending Tetch. Bruce, blaming himself for not killing Jerome in their previous encounter, tracks him down with Selina's help as Jerome tracks down his abusive uncle. Jerome's uncle tries to kill him but Bruce intervenes and, in the ensuing encounter, he chooses to spare Jerome again. Jerome kills his uncle after learning the location of someone for whom he is searching; he and Scarecrow later rescue Tetch and head to 'St. Ignatius,' pursued by Bruce, who alerts Gordon. Elsewhere, Barbara, forcing herself to remember the events surrounding her resurrection, learns that Ra's al Ghul revived her so she could replace him as the Demon's Head and usurps leadership of the League of Shadows with help from the organization's female members, who kill their male comrades to protect her.
83	17	"Mandatory Brunch Meeting"	Maja Vrvilo	Steven Lilien & Bryan Wynbrandt	April 5, 2018	T40.10017	2.53
Thompkins challenges Nygma to his game, the Riddle Factory, and wagers to abolish it if she wins. After she outsmarts Nygma, the two share a kiss. Jerome Valeska assembles the "Legion of Horribles" – Penguin, Mad Hatter, Scarecrow, Firefly, and Mr. Freeze – and sets out to find Wayne Enterprises associate Xander Wilde. Valeska shoots up a Wayne Enterprises building, but is unable to find Wilde and is forced to escape when the GCPD arrives. With help from Bruce, Gordon and Bullock locate Wilde, who reveals that he is Jerome's twin brother, Jeremiah, and also reveals that he has kidnapped Jerome. Mad Hatter and Scarecrow break out Jerome from Jeremiah's custody but are chased off by Gordon and Bullock. Cobblepot convinces Grundy to be hired muscle for the Legion of Horribles, just as Scarecrow concocts a laughing gas for Jerome to spread across the city.
84	18	"That's Entertainment"	Nick Copus	Danny Cannon	April 12, 2018	T40.10018	2.37
Jerome holds the interim mayor and other powerful Gothamites hostage at a music festival and orders Gordon to bring him, Bruce, and Jeremiah, buying time for the other Legion members to load the laughing gas onto a blimp and release it upon the festival crowd. The GCPD takes out Jerome's men and saves the mayor, while Cobblepot betrays the Legion by subduing the pilot and steering the blimp away from civilians. Gordon pursues Jerome, who declares that he will live on and willingly falls to his death from a rooftop. Barbara learns more of her alleged destiny as the League of Shadows' leader, but Tabitha believes she is delusional; Barbara severs ties with Tabitha, who is then taken by another League faction still loyal to Ra's al Ghul. Tricked into opening a "gift" left by Jerome, Jeremiah is exposed to a modified version of the laughing gas that drives him insane.
85	19	"To Our Deaths and Beyond"	Scott White	Peter Blake & Iturri Sosa	April 19, 2018	T40.10019	2.18
Nygma robs several banks to distribute wealth to the Narrows, but Cobblepot tells him Lee is using him as a pawn. Nygma agrees to bring Cobblepot and Grundy along on his next robbery and kill Lee, but betrays them and plans to make Lee fall in love with him; the GCPD arrives, but Lee gives herself up and allows Nygma to escape. With Tabitha's help, the renegade League faction uses Bruce's blood in a ritual to resurrect Ra's al Ghul, who disdains Barbara's limited ambition and tries to take back the power of the Demon's Head. Barbara fights Ra's but returns the power to him when he threatens Tabitha's life. Barbara reconciles with Tabitha, while the female League members recognize her worth as a leader and continue to serve her. After a vision of a cataclysmic event that will soon devastate the city, Ra's resolves to remain alive and use the coming disaster to shape Bruce into the "dark knight of Gotham."
86	20	"That Old Corpse"	Louis Shaw Milito	Charlie Huston	May 3, 2018	T40.10020	1.94
Under seemingly posthumous orders from Jerome, his followers launch an attack on GCPD Headquarters. Nygma infiltrates the precinct and breaks Lee out, while Cobblepot and Grundy torture one of Jerome's followers to uncover the true mastermind and regain power. At his bunker, Jeremiah works on his self-sustaining energy generator and tells Bruce he is struggling against the toxin's insanity, leading to a confrontation at Jerome's grave. Believing the GCPD attack is a diversion from Bruce and Jeremiah, Gordon heads to the bunker and learns the day's events were a subterfuge orchestrated by Jeremiah, who has modified the generator into a bomb; Gordon barely escapes as the generator explodes. Revealing his true insane personality and his plan to tear Gotham down, Jeremiah leaves Bruce unconscious and steals more generators from Wayne Enterprises.
87	21	"One Bad Day"	Rob Bailey	Tze Chun	May 10, 2018	T40.10021	2.21
Jeremiah plants his bombs around Gotham and gives the city six hours to evacuate before detonation. Gordon escapes the bunker with blueprints of Jeremiah's plans but is knocked out before being rescued by Lee and Nygma. Jeremiah also abducts Alfred and lures Bruce to a hideout, where Bruce enlists Selina's help. Scarecrow's fear toxin makes Bruce hallucinate an insane Alfred attacking him, but Selina frees the real Alfred and the two save Bruce. Jeremiah is intercepted by Cobblepot, Grundy, Barbara, and Tabitha, who demand a ransom on the threat of destroying the bombs' core relay; Jeremiah instead destroys the relay himself and rewires the bombs to detonate in sequence. After Nygma deciphers the blueprints, Gordon brings the plans to GCPD; with help from Fox, Bullock locates and deactivates the first bomb in time. Gordon then reveals on a newscast that he is alive, as Jeremiah believed that the bomb in his bunker killed Gordon. His plans foiled, Jeremiah incinerates all his followers alive but is later approached by Ra's al Ghul, who proposes an alliance. Bruce, Selina, and Alfred return to Wayne Manor, but Jeremiah breaks in and shoots Selina in the abdomen before Alfred subdues him.
88	22	"No Man's Land"	Nathan Hope	John Stephens & Seth Boston	May 17, 2018	T40.10022	2.20
Selina is hospitalized with severe spinal damage. Ra's al Ghul kidnaps Bruce, breaks Jeremiah out of custody, and steals his bombs back from the GCPD. Nygma tries to kill Gordon and free Lee from her old self, but Lee falsely convinces Nygma that she no longer loves Gordon. Cobblepot, Alfred, and the Sirens briefly ally against Jeremiah and the League of Shadows. Barbara kills Ra's with his knife (gripping it in Bruce's hands), while Jeremiah's bombs kill the mayor and destroy every bridge out of Gotham, reducing the city to lawlessness. Cobblepot hires Hugo Strange, who successfully turns Grundy back into Butch; however, Cobblepot then kills Butch in front of Tabitha as retribution for his mother. Lee decides to help the civilians and breaks up with Nygma, but the confrontation ends with the two stabbing each other; Cobblepot finds their bodies and orders Strange to "fix" them. With Gotham largely evacuated and overrun by criminals, Bruce accepts his destiny as the city's protector and begins hunting Jeremiah. Gordon, supported by Bullock, Fox, and a dozen other cops, also stays to fight for the city and operates a searchlight atop GCPD Headquarters as a symbol against the darkness.

== Production ==
=== Development ===
The show was officially renewed by Fox for a fourth season on May 10, 2017. Just like the second and third seasons, the fourth season also carried a new subtitle for the season: A Dark Knight.

=== Writing ===
The producers revealed that the season would be based on the comic book stories Batman: The Long Halloween and Batman: Year One. According to executive producer John Stephens, the season would not consist of "direct adaptations", but "loose interpretations" of the comic book series. Ben McKenzie explained that the structure for the season would be "the beginning is more Long Halloween, our version of that, and the end is more Year One." According to Stephens, the show would handle a horror-oriented direction on the season: "At the very beginning of the season, Penguin has solidified his control upon Gotham like never before. Where he's kind of unionized crime. And Scarecrow comes in to basically reintroduce fear into Gotham and to remind people that the dark is still scary out there. And we're really going to fashion, especially Episode 2, almost a horror movie episode where we really get to see Scarecrow. I think he's like purely terrifying. Imagine, rather than the other versions of Scarecrow out there—because there are a lot of different versions—what if you just really tell Scarecrow as a horror movie? Because he could be scary as hell." Executive producer Danny Cannon stated, "When the studio asks you to tone back because it's too scary, you know you've done something right!"

Regarding Bruce's beginning of vigilantism, McKenzie explained that "We are definitely leaning into Bruce, having learned some of the skills to be a vigilante, now actually attempting it. Now, we have a long, long way to go before he can realistically be Batman, so there will be many stumbles and falls – and regressions back to being a kid at times – but Gordon will eventually become aware of what he's doing and that will bring them against each other." David Mazouz also added, "Bruce really is taking on this vigilante persona and all the things that go along with that. Whether it be creating another persona, a public persona, that's also definitely going to be a major part of Bruce's journey this year. His relationship as this other person. Batman is coming. Absolutely." Mazouz also stated that he was worried the writers could pull back some aspects from Batman, deeming it "too fast" but he was glad it didn't stop. He said that Bruce would take the "Batman persona" this season. Cannon also explained that Bruce will be seen "as the emerging threat he is." Alexander Siddig stated that his character will seek to make Bruce his heir and will "do anything he can to get his hands on him, to manipulate him into what [Ra's] wants him to be." He also claimed that the season is "a season so far of extremes."

Talking about his character, McKenzie stated, "Comparatively, perhaps he's in a better place than some of these other truly evil, evil people." But as the season will be with him dealing with Cobblepot, Gordon "doesn't have a lot of good options. He has to either fight him directly or find allies to fight Penguin—surrogates to fight Penguin—which leads him down a dark path. So, that's kind of the way we start for him in season 4." According to Stephens, "We're going to see Jim make, in some ways, big steps toward I guess what you would call the commissionership. But also we're going to see Jim, in his quest to save the city, cross different ethical lines than he ever did before. It's going to bring him to an ethical nadir that we haven't seen him at, and it's going to be told through the context of a relationship that he has with Sofia Falcone, the daughter of Don Falcone, who's played by Crystal Reed this year. And that's going to be a really compelling and interesting relationship." Sean Pertwee also stated that the season will also explore Alfred's mysterious past "indirectly".

McKenzie made his writing debut on the episode "The Demon's Head", after previously directing the third-season episode "These Delicate and Dark Obsessions". McKenzie went to Los Angeles to work on the writers' room to break the story and then go back to New York City and finish many drafts. He explained, "I've been fiddling around with writing for a long time, but I'd never written an episode of television, so it was quite a learning process." He also added that, "From being on a set, the directing came fairly naturally. It was challenging, but there were a lot of things that I understood about directing just from observing, just from watching director's work. Writing often takes place behind-the-scenes. Physical production is not privy to how scripts come out... I wasn't so familiar with that process of breaking a story, of starting with a story document, then an outline, and then a draft; it was informative".

For the second half of the season, Cameron Monaghan stated that "We're borrowing very heavily from some of the most iconic Batman storylines. I think that they're deep enough, and they show where its really splitting that duality and start totally embracing the main arcs. I think that we did a little bit in season three to bring it into The Killing Joke." He also added that the plan for the final episodes is to adapt Batman: No Man's Land, stating, "We're really getting into it this year. I think the way that the story escalates is something that shifts and is not anything the show has done before. I think it's going to be a really unique experience. Especially by the past few episodes, it's going to be really... it's pretty insane."

=== Casting ===
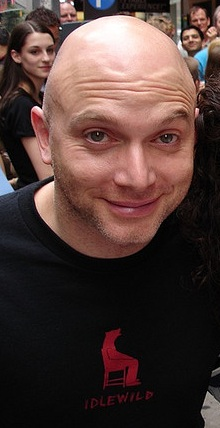
Michael Cerveris made his debut in the show in a multi-episode arc as Lazlo Valentin / Professor Pyg. The season also marks Pyg's first live-action portrayal.

With the exception of Benedict Samuel and Michael Chiklis, all main actors from the previous season returned for the show, with Maggie Geha being downgraded to guest star. Crystal Reed joined the series in July 2017 in the series regular role of Sofia Falcone. Alexander Siddig was promoted to the main cast. In September 2017, Michael Cerveris joined the show as Lazlo Valentin / Professor Pyg, in a multi-episode role. Cerveris stated, "Professor Pyg is a brilliant and chameleon-like person who has a highly developed sense of what's right and wrong—it just might not be a sense of right and wrong that corresponds with everybody else's." He also added that, "When they [the writers] had somebody who played Sweeney Todd, they knew the direction they wanted to go... [Broadway fans who don't watch Gotham] might give it a look simply because of that, and find that they have a new favorite show." Regarding the Dollotrons, Cerveris stated, "You know how much he's liked the Pyg in the comics, but I would say that his focus in Gotham is more on things to do with Gotham and with the city and with Jim Gordon. He's certainly is the manipulative character, and certainly, you know, is trying to get people to do stuff whether they know why they're doing it or not. But, that's sort of exclusive. His whole reason for existing is not the Dollotrons." He described the character as having "a Hannibal Lecter-ish quality." He also jokingly added that he couldn't eat bacon "because I just can't bring myself to eat my little friends." Donal Logue stated, "We have Michael Cerveris coming in and playing Professor Pyg and he's such an incredibly gifted actor and, as happens a lot, the gentlest and most gifted of artistic souls can play the darkest, creepiest human beings known to literature or film."

Besides, the character of Tommy Elliot was also set to return to the show, having appeared in the episode "The Mask". However, co-executive producer Bryan Wynbrandt added, "Obviously when Tommy Elliot is discussed, there's always is that Hush storyline. That is something that we've discussed. Right now, we're kind of still feeling that out. It could be something on the horizon, but I can't say for sure." Also, Peyton List was cast as a new iteration of Ivy Pepper. According to Bryan Wynbrandt, "The change was all based on the idea that she's continuing to evolve to become more of the Ivy from the comic books and what we really enjoyed. In this third evolution you're going to see a really self possessed, really scary and driven version of the Ivy character, who is intent on kind of making the world in the image she sees it should be, which is the green world. The world where the plants rule and people are an after thought."

As a concept McKenzie wished to explore, the fourth season was set to bring back the actor Charlie Tahan as Jonathan Crane / Scarecrow, who portrayed the character on the first-season episodes: "The Fearsome Dr. Crane" and "The Scarecrow". A trailer was screened on the 2017 San Diego Comic-Con that showed Crane donning a new costume under the Scarecrow persona. McKenzie explained: "So we met his father Dr Crane in Season 1. So we've taken our time; we're gonna come back now to his son. You know, in circumstances probably not best described now, his son takes on his father's mantle and becomes the fully-realized Scarecrow. It's great. We're able to use this sort of fear toxin that Scarecrow is able to summon. We're completely unafraid—or perhaps afraid but we still persist–in expanding the universe and our capabilities." Tahan commented on his character, "He's sort of trying to build an army with this toxin. Scarecrow might start brainwashing people. I'm not exactly sure what his endgame is—I don't even know if he knows. He has this revelation that he doesn't have to fear fear." However, due to Tahan's commitment to the series Ozark, the role ended up recast with David W. Thompson, who portrayed him in the second half of the season.

When asked about Jerome Valeska's return in the season, Stephens stated, "What I will say about Jerome is that Jerome is in Arkham right now, and when you think about Arkham's record of keeping people locked up, we will probably see him again before the end of the year." In September 2017, Stephens explained, "You're totally gonna see him this year. You're gonna see him in a new position this year", also teasing that Jerome would be an ally to Penguin on the season. Ben McKenzie said, "Jerome is one of our most beloved characters. The idea here was to really give the audience more time to enjoy and savor [Cameron Monaghan's] performance." Regarding the partnership between Jerome and Penguin, Robin Lord Taylor said "You have Jerome, who is chaos, and you have Oswald, who is control. So you can imagine, there are ways that those can integrate, but at the same time they're opposites." Stephens also added that Fish Mooney is "gone for good", saying, "Now, that one was it. At a certain point, you gotta say 'Definitely.' People die at a certain point, and that's the second or third time they die [on Gotham]"

=== Filming ===
Filming for the season began on June 20, 2017, at Steiner Studios in Brooklyn, New York. In January 2018, it was announced that Ben McKenzie would direct an episode after making his directional debut the previous season. It was later revealed that he would be directing the 16th episode, titled "One of My Three Soups". Production on the season officially wrapped in late March 2018.

== Release ==
=== Broadcast ===
The season was originally set to air on September 28, 2017, on Fox in the United States. However, on July 28, 2017, Fox decided to move up the premiere to September 21, 2017, in order to give its companion newcomer series The Orville a continuous run. The fourth season is moving to a Thursday timeslot, alongside The Orville, after airing its past seasons on Mondays.

=== Marketing ===
In July 2017, the cast and crew attended San Diego Comic-Con to discuss and promote the season, showing a five-minute sizzle reel from season 3 as well as the debut trailer for the season. The second episode "The Fear Reaper" was screened on September 23, 2017, when Cannon, McKenzie, Taylor, Bicondova, Mazouz, Pertwee and Lucas promoted the series at the inaugural Tribeca TV Festival. Besides, the cast will attend the New York Comic Con in October 2017 to promote the season as well as a Q&A presentation with the cast. The season was also heavily marketed by trailers showcasing Bruce's beginning of vigilantism as well as Jonathan Crane's debut, both of whom received positive response from audience with Digital Spy's Justin Hart commenting, "Sounds like a perfect time for young Bruce Wayne to finally embrace his destiny as a masked vigilante, doesn't it?" while Albert Achar from IndieWire commented, "it looks like it is going to be a very wild ride."

As part of promotion for the ninth episode "Let Them Eat Pie", Fox released a "red band" trailer featuring Michael Cerveris as Professor Pyg, teasing a Sweeney Todd storyline in the episode as well as a musical number, which was considered by TV Guide as "insane."

=== Home media ===
The season is set to be released on Blu-ray on August 21, 2018. On August 15, 2018, the season was made available on Netflix UK and Ireland one month prior to its Region 2 DVD release.

== Reception ==
=== Ratings ===
Viewership and ratings per episode of Gotham season 4
No.	Title	Air date	Rating/share (18–49)	Viewers (millions)	DVR (18–49)	DVR viewers (millions)	Total (18–49)	Total viewers (millions)
1	"Pax Penguina"	September 21, 2017	1.0/4	3.21	—N/a	—N/a	—N/a	—N/a
2	"The Fear Reaper"	September 28, 2017	0.9/3	2.87	0.7	1.91	1.6	4.77
3	"They Who Hide Behind Masks"	October 5, 2017	0.9/3	2.92	0.7	1.80	1.6	4.72
4	"The Demon's Head"	October 12, 2017	0.9/3	2.75	0.6	1.72	1.5	4.47
5	"The Blade's Path"	October 19, 2017	0.9/3	2.75	—N/a	1.75	—N/a	4.50
6	"Hog Day Afternoon"	October 26, 2017	0.9/3	2.87	—N/a	1.74	—N/a	4.61
7	"A Day in the Narrows"	November 2, 2017	0.9/3	2.75	—N/a	1.57	—N/a	4.32
8	"Stop Hitting Yourself"	November 9, 2017	0.9/3	2.70	0.7	1.78	1.6	4.49
9	"Let Them Eat Pie"	November 16, 2017	0.9/3	2.63	—N/a	1.55	—N/a	4.17
10	"Things That Go Boom"	November 30, 2017	0.8/3	2.59	0.6	1.56	1.4	4.15
11	"Queen Takes Knight"	December 7, 2017	0.8/3	2.53	—N/a	1.56	—N/a	4.09
12	"Pieces of a Broken Mirror"	March 1, 2018	0.8/3	2.57	—N/a	1.52	—N/a	4.09
13	"A Beautiful Darkness"	March 8, 2018	0.7/3	2.41	—N/a	1.52	—N/a	3.93
14	"Reunion"	March 15, 2018	0.6/2	2.55	0.6	1.45	1.2	4.00
15	"The Sinking Ship The Grand Applause"	March 22, 2018	0.7/3	2.47	0.5	1.54	1.2	4.01
16	"One of My Three Soups"	March 29, 2018	0.7/3	2.39	0.6	1.47	1.3	3.86
17	"Mandatory Brunch Meeting"	April 5, 2018	0.7/3	2.53	0.6	1.43	1.3	3.97
18	"That's Entertainment"	April 12, 2018	0.7/3	2.37	—N/a	1.49	—N/a	3.85
19	"To Our Deaths and Beyond"	April 19, 2018	0.6/3	2.18	0.5	1.36	1.1	3.54
20	"That Old Corpse"	May 3, 2018	0.6/2	1.94	0.5	1.36	1.1	3.30
21	"One Bad Day"	May 10, 2018	0.7/3	2.21	—N/a	1.27	—N/a	3.48
22	"No Man's Land"	May 17, 2018	0.6/3	2.20	0.5	1.27	1.1	3.47

The premiere was watched by 3.21 million viewers with a 1.0 in the 18–49 demo, which was a 17% decline from the previous season premiere but on par with last season's average.

=== Critical response ===
The review aggregator website Rotten Tomatoes reported an 81% approval rating with an average rating of 6.88/10 based on 21 reviews.

=== Accolades ===
Year	Award	Category	Nominee(s)	Result	Ref.
2018	Saturn Awards	Best Superhero Television Series	Gotham	Nominated	
2018	Saturn Awards	Best Performance by a Younger Actor on a Television Series	David Mazouz	Nominated	
2018	Teen Choice Awards	Choice Action Series	Gotham	Nominated	
2018	Teen Choice Awards	Choice Action TV Actor	David Mazouz	Nominated	
2018	Teen Choice Awards	Choice TV Villain	Cameron Monaghan	Nominated	
2018	Creative Arts Emmy Awards	Outstanding Special Visual Effects in a Supporting Role	"That's Entertainment"	Nominated	
