= Let Them Eat Pie =

- Gotham episode
- Episode no.: Season 4 Episode 9
- Directed by: Nathan Hope
- Written by: Iturri Sosa
- Cinematography by: Scott Kevan; Crescenzo Notarile
- Editing by: Sarah C. Reeves
- Production code: T40.10009
- Original air date: November 16, 2017
- Running time: 43 minutes

Guest appearances
- Michael Cerveris as Professor Pyg; Christopher Convery as Martin; Gordon Winarick as Tommy Elliot

Episode chronology
← Previous "Stop Hitting Yourself"	Next → "Things That Go Boom"
- Gotham season 4

"Let Them Eat Pie" is the ninth episode of the fourth season and 75th episode overall from the Fox series Gotham. The show is itself based on the characters created by DC Comics set in the Batman mythology. The episode was written by consulting producer Iturri Sosa on his writing debut and directed by Nathan Hope. It was first broadcast on November 16, 2017.

In the episode, the newly appointed GCPD Captain Gordon and the task force continue the manhunt for Professor Pyg, who has now killed homeless people and served them as "meat pies" he plans to use at Sofia Falcone's fundraising event. Oswald Cobblepot begins to doubt Sofia's true intentions and is paranoid after finding Gordon as the new Captain. Also, Alfred gets angered at Bruce's new behavior.

The episode received positive reviews from critics, who praised Cerveris' performance, Bruce's character development as well as Gordon and Pyg's fight.

== Plot ==
Professor Pyg (Michael Cerveris) serves food to homeless people and takes 6 of them to a dining hall, where he serves them poisoned food. He then begins removing parts of their bodies. Meanwhile, Gordon (Ben McKenzie) arrives just as Bullock (Donal Logue) is leaving the Captain's office.

Sofia (Crystal Reed) prepares for a fundraising event when she is visited by Cobblepot (Robin Lord Taylor), who is angry at Gordon being promoted as GCPD Captain and sets to find the person who authorized it as the Mayor is currently missing. Gordon continues receiving threats from Pyg, who has now pitched a tent with two corpses being eaten by pigs outside the GCPD. Meanwhile, Bruce (David Mazouz) is confronted by Alfred (Sean Pertwee) for his recent misbehavior and is reminded of their yearly tradition of going to the top of a hill.

Lucius Fox (Chris Chalk) tells Gordon that the corpses were filled with materials that produce paper, so he goes to investigate a closed paper mill. However, he is ambushed and Pyg kidnaps him. Pyg later shows up at Sofia's fundraising event as a chef, preparing meat pies made of homeless people. In the hill, Alfred tells Bruce the story of how he met Thomas Wayne and how he saved his life. Bruce distracts Alfred, takes the keys and flees in the car.

At the fundraising event, Pyg serves Gotham's Elite, including Sofia and Cobblepot the pies. When Sofia questions him, he stabs her in the hand. Meanwhile, Pyg explains that everyone will eat the pies or he will kill Martin (Christopher Convery). When one of them dismisses Martin for being an orphan, Cobblepot kills him. He then forces everyone to eat the pies. Gordon arrives and fights with Pyg on the table, eventually stabbing Pyg in the arm and defeating him. Pyg is later sent to Arkham Asylum.

In the aftermath, Cobblepot decides to abandon the licenses but tells Sofia that Gordon cannot continue being Captain. In Wayne Manor, Bruce has hosted a party with friends when Alfred shows up. After everyone leaves, Alfred confronts Bruce for his actions. Bruce explains that nothing has changed since the death of Ra's al Ghul, despite having avenged his parents' death. He then tells Alfred to just be his butler, not his father. That night, Gordon visits Sofia and after a talk, Sofia kisses him. Martin later shows this information to Cobblepot. Tearful, he states she will pay.

== Production ==
=== Development ===
In October 2017, it was announced that the ninth episode of the season would be titled "Let Them Eat Pie" and was to be written by Iturri Sosa and directed by Nathan Hope.

=== Casting ===
Morena Baccarin, Erin Richards, Camren Bicondova, Cory Michael Smith, Jessica Lucas, Drew Powell, and Alexander Siddig do not appear in the episode as their respective characters. In October 2017, it was announced that the guest cast for the episode would include Michael Cerveris as Professor Pyg, Gordon Winarick as Tommy Elliot, and Christopher Convery as Martin.

== Reception ==
=== Viewers ===
The episode was watched by 2.62 million viewers with a 0.9/3 share among adults aged 18 to 49. This was a slight decrease in viewership from the previous episode, which was watched by 2.70 million viewers with a 0.9/3 in the 18-49 demographics. With these ratings, Gotham ranked second for Fox, behind The Orville, fourth on its timeslot, and eleventh for the night, behind The Orville, How to Get Away with Murder, S.W.A.T., Scandal, Life in Pieces, Mom, Grey's Anatomy, Young Sheldon, The Big Bang Theory, and Thursday Night Football.

=== Critical reviews ===
Professional ratings
Review scores
Source	Rating
IGN	7.3
TV Fanatic	4.0/5.0 stars
TV Overmind	4.0/5.0 stars

"A Dark Knight: Let Them Eat Pie" received positive reviews from critics. Matt Fowler of IGN gave the episode a "good" 7.3 out of 10 and wrote in his verdict, "'Let Them Eat Pie' was notable for Pyg's dinner scene and the insanity that ensued (including song & dance, meat pies, and his showdown with Jim), but the character's over-the-top schemes, and psycho butchery, don't match up with his blasé quest to end city corruption."

Kyle Fowle of The A.V. Club wrote "For the most part, this episode is a significant step down from every that came before it. I think the fact that it's the end of the Professor Pyg arc is the problem. Gotham has told its more compelling stories in the build-up to this episode, and 'Let Them Eat Pie,' partly out of necessity, is focused solely on catching Pyg. There's no Barbara, Tabitha, and Selina, nothing else with the fight club. Integral, entertaining pieces are missing."

Nick Hogan of TV Overmind gave the episode a 4 star rating out of 5, writing "Overall, I'm pleased with the way things are going on Gotham. It's still a bit confusing to have things titled 'A Dark Knight' and have Bruce involved in such a weird way, but the storytelling prowess is still there. The characters are strong as ever, and the story is exciting, and that's all that really matters on Gotham." Sydney Bucksbaum of The Hollywood Reporter wrote, "As annoying and bratty as Bruce (David Mazouz) has been acting recently, taking his billionaire party boy character mask a little too seriously, it's undeniable that it's giving the young actor some real meat to work with this season."

Vinnie Mancuso of Collider wrote, "What's important is that Gotham only has two chapters left until its mid-season finale. We've already gotten pig-themed murder, Frankenstein's monster competing in underground MMA, and a jaunty showtune about cannibalism. Hold on to your undercrackers, I cannot wait to see how Gotham closes this one out for the winter." Lisa Babick of TV Fanatic gave the series a 4 star rating out of 5, writing "Jim's first day as Captain was a blast on Gotham Season 4 Episode 9. Even though he wasn't invited to Sofia's fundraiser dinner, he still got to be part of the fun when Professor Pyg made an appearance. And that was one bizarro dinner, wasn't it?" Marc Buxton of Den of Geek gave wrote, "Thankfully, Gotham saves the day with a pure gross out, surreal bit of business that features a dude with a pig head singing while feeding homeless people to rich folk, and it's stuff like that that sets Gotham apart from the countless other comic book shows on TV."
