= A Day in the Narrows =

- Gotham episode
- Episode no.: Season 4 Episode 7
- Directed by: John Behring
- Written by: Peter Blake
- Cinematography by: Crescenzo Notarile
- Editing by: Barrie Wise
- Production code: T40.10007
- Original air date: November 2, 2017
- Running time: 43 minutes

Guest appearances
- Michael Cerveris as Lazlo Valentin / Professor Pyg; Kelcy Griffin as Detective Harper; Kyle Vincent Terry as Headhunter; Tommy Nelson as Brant Jones; Samia Finnerty as Grace Blomdahl; Gordon Winarick as Tommy Elliot

Episode chronology
← Previous "Hog Day Afternoon"	Next → "Stop Hitting Yourself"
- Gotham season 4

"A Day in the Narrows" is the seventh episode of the fourth season and 73rd episode overall from the Fox series Gotham. The show is itself based on the characters created by DC Comics set in the Batman mythology. The episode was written by co-executive producer Peter Blake and directed by John Behring. It was first broadcast on November 2, 2017.

In the episode, Gordon and Bullock go after Professor Pyg after he kidnaps three police officers. They manage to locate two but one of them dies. They then discover a third one is being held hostage by Pyg in a courthouse. However, Gordon is certain it is a trap but his advice falls into deaf ears as Oswald Cobblepot wants to gain popularity by leading the raid. Meanwhile, Bruce finds himself with former classmates and experiences a severe maturity change. Also, Selina and Tabitha set to find money from a biker gang.

The episode received generally positive reviews, with critics praising Bruce's character development. However, the episode's subplots and pace were criticized.

== Plot ==
The GCPD receives gift boxes containing pig heads, with a box for each police officer in the department, except for Gordon (Ben McKenzie). Meanwhile, at a fundraising event, Bruce (David Mazouz) feels different after having killed Ra's al Ghul. Later, Bruce is met by Grace Blomdahl (Samia Finnerty), a former classmate, and they decide to spend time together.

In the GCPD, Gordon is visited by Cobblepot (Robin Lord Taylor) and his new security consultant Headhunter (Kyle Vincent Terry), who are working on the case as the dead officers are affecting Cobblepot's business. They are also notified that three officers were missing in the Narrows. The GCPD and Cobblepot's henchmen lead a raid in the Narrows looking for the cops but some officers also attack many residents in the area. Headhunter manages to get information by threatening a resident and they find two officers tied on a building with one of them dead. The wounded officer tells Gordon about a clue in a courthouse.

Grace takes Bruce to a building where they meet with many friends including Brant Jones (Tommy Nelson) and Tommy Elliot (Gordon Winarick). Bruce imagines punching Brant after he begins making rude remarks about him and Alfred (Sean Pertwee). They attend a nightclub but when they are refused entrance, Bruce buys the nightclub and all enter, with the exception of Brant.

Meanwhile, Barbara (Erin Richards) announces that the gun shop, funded by Ra's al Ghul, is closing, and that the three of them should split the payout and go their separate ways. Selina (Camren Bicondova) attempts to rob a bikers' club to try to keep the group together, but gets trapped. Tabitha (Jessica Lucas) breaks in to effect a rescue, which is looking dicey before Barbara arrives as an unexpected backup, kills most of the bikers, and the three women walk away with a handsome cash reward to triumphant background music.

Gordon and Cobblepot's henchmen arrive at the courthouse. However, Gordon receives a threat from Professor Pyg (Michael Cerveris) on the phone if he enters and puts the wounded officer's voice. After checking with the hospital, Gordon tells Cobblepot and Bullock (Donal Logue) that Pyg was the wounded officer in disguise and going in the courthouse would be a trap. Bullock dismisses this and sets a raid team and enter the courthouse, shooting Pyg as he is about to kill the officer. However, the officer is in Pyg's clothes and his fall sets off a pair of automatic machine guns, killing many police officers and pinning them down until Gordon enters and effects a rescue.

In the aftermath, Gordon is applauded by media and the GCPD for his actions. He is again called by Pyg, who, while he removes his disguise, tells him he has more plans in mind. Cobblepot stabs Headhunter. Back on the nightclub, Bruce and Grace kiss and Bruce starts drinking and partying for the first time. In the GCPD, Gordon is lauded by the media as a hero, the GCPD stops accepting the licenses, and Bullock complains that while Gordon is now a hero, he is now "just a cop that shot another cop".

== Production ==
=== Development ===
In October 2017, it was announced that the seventh episode of the season would be titled "A Day in the Narrows" and was to be written by Peter Blake and directed by John Behring.

=== Casting ===
Morena Baccarin, Cory Michael Smith, Drew Powell, and Alexander Siddig don't appear in the episode as their respective characters. In October 2017, it was announced that the guest cast for the episode would include Michael Cerveris as Professor Pyg, Marina Benedict as Cherry, Tommy Nelson as Brant Jones, Kyle Vincent Terry as Headhunter, Samia Finnerty as Grace, Gordon Winarick as Tommy Elliot, Christopher Convery as Martin, and Gregory Konow as Beat Cop.

== Reception ==
=== Viewers ===
The episode was watched by 2.75 million viewers with a 0.9/3 share among adults aged 18 to 49. This was a 5% decrease in viewership from the previous episode, which was watched by 2.87 million viewers with a 0.9/3 in the 18-49 demographics. With these ratings, Gotham ranked second for Fox, behind The Orville, fourth on its timeslot, and tenth for the night, behind How to Get Away with Murder, The Good Place, Superstore, The Orville, Chicago Fire, Scandal, S.W.A.T., Life in Pieces, Mom, Will & Grace, Grey's Anatomy, Young Sheldon, and The Big Bang Theory.

=== Critical reviews ===
Professional ratings
Review scores
Source	Rating
IGN	6.8
TV Fanatic	4.5/5.0 stars
TV Overmind	4.0/5.0 stars

"A Dark Knight: A Day in the Narrows" received generally positive reviews from critics. Matt Fowler of IGN gave the episode an "okay" 6.8 out of 10 and wrote in his verdict, "Bruce blowing off some steam was the highlight of this week's clunky cop-straightening episode, 'A Day in the Narrows,' as Pyg became even less Pyg-like, the GCPD became a terror squad, and Penguin's hair rose to new, absurd heights."

Kyle Fowle of The A.V. Club wrote "Gotham has done a good job of slowly building to this episode, which feels like a climax of sorts when Bullock ends up botching an operation after Gordon warns him to call it off. Every episode has steadily contributed to a better understanding of how Pax Penguina is affecting the city, the GCPD, and the relationship between Gordon and Bullock. It's clear, effective storytelling."

Nick Hogan of TV Overmind gave the episode a 4 star rating out of 5, writing "Ultimately the episode was still a good one, but only because the Professor Pyg story was so strong. I'd have like to seen [sic] the other things take place in a future episode. But hey, I'll take what I can get!" Sydney Bucksbaum of The Hollywood Reporter wrote, "One of Gordon's fellow cops that he saved from Professor Pyg's attack decided to stop accepting Penguin's Pax Penguina licenses for crime. It's small, but it's meaningful, especially since Bullock seems to be slipping back into his old, bad habits."

Vinnie Mancuso of Collider wrote, "While 'A Day In The Narrows' doesn't quite hold up to last week's Gotham in the episode title department, it does continue the streak of these straight up cartoonishly absurd hours of television that Season 4 has been popping out on the regular, and I for one am into it." Lisa Babick of TV Fanatic gave the series a 4.5 star rating out of 5, writing "Gotham needs to pump them back up. These little teases need to become reality. There's no reason three badass women can't rule Gotham's underworld." Marc Buxton of Den of Geek gave wrote, "For the first time, potentially in the four-year history of this show, Gotham has made an effective argument for the GCPD. It only took playing the corrupt cop thing out to some of its darkest conclusions for it to get there."
