= Things That Go Boom =

- Gotham episode
- Episode no.: Season 4 Episode 10
- Directed by: Louis Shaw Milito
- Written by: Steven Lilien & Bryan Wynbrandt
- Cinematography by: Scott Kevan
- Editing by: Barrie Wise
- Production code: T40.10010
- Original air date: November 30, 2017
- Running time: 43 minutes

Guest appearances
- Michael Cerveris as Professor Pyg; Christopher Convery as Martin; Stu "Large" Riley as Sampson; Anthony Carrigan as Victor Zsasz

Episode chronology
← Previous "Let Them Eat Pie"	Next → "Queen Takes Knight"
- Gotham season 4

"Things That Go Boom" is the tenth episode of the fourth season and 76th episode overall from the Fox series Gotham. The show is itself based on the characters created by DC Comics set in the Batman mythology. The episode was written by co-executive producers Steven Lilien & Bryan Wynbrandt on his writing debut and directed by Louis Shaw Milito. It was first broadcast on November 30, 2017.

In the episode, Sofia and Cobblepot's war tension begins to increase when both sides start attacking violently. Gordon decides to do something before the city falls due to the war while also trying to identify Pyg's identity. Meanwhile, Barbara, Tabitha and Selina set to find a way to settle their debt to Cobblepot while Lee and Nygma face problems on their first days as rulers of the fight club.

The episode received positive reviews from critics, though they criticized Cobblepot acting out of character as well as Professor Pyg overstaying its welcome.

== Plot ==
In the playroom at Arkham Asylum, Professor Pyg (Michael Cerveris) plays Ave Maria on a gramophone. He is then confronted by an inmate, who got beaten by his mother while listening to the song. After the inmate attacks him, Pyg breaks a record in half and uses it to kill the inmate.

Gordon (Ben McKenzie) and Fox (Chris Chalk) check the X-rays for Pyg, discovering that due to his many facial surgeries, his real identity cannot be tracked. Gordon is visited by Sofia (Crystal Reed), who wants to continue seeing him, citing her confession to Cobblepot (Robin Lord Taylor) as a matter of trust but Gordon rebuffs it. In the Narrows, Lee (Morena Baccarin) begins her tenure as the leader of the club forming a court to bring justice. She's notified by a man that he got beaten by a gangster named Sampson (Stu "Large" Riley).

Sofia arrives home and is confronted by Cobblepot and Zsasz (Anthony Carrigan). She is about to get tortured but manages to convince her torturer to turn against Cobblepot and she escapes but is kidnapped by Barbara (Erin Richards), Tabitha (Jessica Lucas) and Selina (Camren Bicondova). While talking to Martin (Christopher Convery), Cobblepot is told by him that Sofia made him lie about the kiss with Gordon. Lee and Nygma (Cory Michael Smith) confront Sampson, who plans on taking down the fight club. He is revealed to suffer from bronchitis, which Lee tells him is a more serious lung disease.

Gordon visits Pyg in Arkham and after a brief discussion, manages to make Pyg reveal his Southern accent. Cobblepot is contacted by Barbara, who outlines her demands in exchange for Sofia, which he agrees to. However, he instead sends Zsasz to kill them all. Zsasz fires a bazooka into their secret club but the girls manage to flee the area. Sofia tells Gordon about it but he soon finds that she is using this as an excuse to kill Cobblepot. Gordon then meets with Cobblepot to make a deal in which both will make sure Sofia leaves Gotham at nightfall and let Cobblepot continue ruling his empire.

Lee and Nygma arrive at the clinic and find it wrecked, deducing Sampson had it destroyed. They confront him and reveal that Lee has put a poison into Sampson's drink and she has the antidote. She gives it to him with the condition that he leaves the Narrows. After talking with Sofia, Gordon handcuffs her and sends a detective to escort her to the train station. Cobblepot discovers that Martin has been kidnapped. Zsasz intercepts Sofia's train and learns that she had Martin kidnapped as a hostage, to ensure her release.

Sofia, Barbara, Tabitha and Selina take Martin to a meeting with Cobblepot, who surrenders so Martin is freed. He puts him in the car and then blows the car up, planning to not let them use Martin as a pawn, declaring a war. Lee also learns that Nygma's side effects from being frozen have been worn off – Nygma begins having hallucinations of his dual personality, as the Riddler. Martin is revealed to have survived, part of a plan Cobblepot had to instigate the war. He then has Zsasz take Martin out of Gotham for his safety. Fox tells Gordon that DNA tests showed that Pyg's real identity is Lazlo Valentin, a serial killer in the South. Gordon goes to visit Pyg but finds him gone, a guard dead and "It's been fun James – Lazlo" written in the wall with the guard's blood.

== Production ==
=== Development ===
In November 2017, it was announced that the tenth episode of the season would be titled "Things That Go Boom" and was to be written by co-executive producers Steven Lilien & Bryan Wynbrandt and directed by Louis Shaw Milito.

=== Casting ===
Donal Logue, David Mazouz, Sean Pertwee, and Alexander Siddig don't appear in the episode as their respective characters. In November 2017, it was announced that the guest cast for the episode would include Michael Cerveris as Professor Pyg, Anthony Carrigan as Victor Zsasz, Stu Large Riley as Sampson, and Christopher Convery as Martin.

== Reception ==
=== Viewers ===
The episode was watched by 2.59 million viewers with a 0.8/3 share among adults aged 18 to 49. This was a slight decrease in viewership from the previous episode, which was watched by 2.62 million viewers with a 0.9/3 in the 18-49 demographics. With these ratings, Gotham ranked second for Fox, behind The Orville, fourth on its timeslot, and tenth for the night, behind The Orville, S.W.A.T., Life in Pieces, The Wonderful World of Disney, Mom, A Charlie Brown Christmas, Young Sheldon, The Big Bang Theory, and Thursday Night Football.

=== Critical reviews ===
Professional ratings
Review scores
Source	Rating
IGN	7.0
TV Overmind	4.0/5.0 stars

"A Dark Knight: Things That Go Boom" received mixed-to-positive reviews from critics. Matt Fowler of IGN gave the episode a "good" 7.0 out of 10 and wrote in his verdict, "Gotham had the chance to do something really dark and defining with Penguin, but pulled the rug out from under us, and also, in turn, the drama from this episode. On top of that, Pyg now apparently gets to be the real Pyg now that the show's strange shoehorned version of him has run its course."

Kyle Fowle of The A.V. Club wrote "Now we're on our way to another war for control of Gotham's criminal underground, as next week is the fall finale. The season started out promising enough, and 'Things That Go Boom' isn't a total failure by any means, but the same old narrative patterns from past seasons are becoming evident again. The Big Bad escapes, the criminal underground goes to war, and Jim must try to balance his need for law and order with the necessity of pairing up with the likes of Penguin. Still, even as the plot becomes more familiar, this season has found its footing with so many characters that even the most tired stories still have some life to them."

Nick Hogan of TV Overmind gave the episode a 4 star rating out of 5, writing "Overall, I enjoyed this episode of Gotham. It did feel like it was setting up something more, so judging it on its stand-alone merits doesn't seem prudent. Still, the characters are strong and they're a joy to watch. Plus, there was nothing from Bruce the rebellious partying teen, so that's good."

Vinnie Mancuso of Collider wrote, "Compared to the absolute batfuck insanity that was the episodes preceding it, tonight's Gotham — titled 'Things That Go Boom' — was a bit boring. Keep in mind, this is a wonky scale I'm grading on; with Gotham, 'boring' just means the writers got through a whole hour without, like, having a hot air balloon full of nuns plunge into a wood-chipper. So, be aware that when I say this episode was a little 'boring' I mean only one (1) mute orphan in a bow-tie died in a fiery explosion." Marc Buxton of Den of Geek gave wrote, "It says a lot about Gotham that I more or less believed the show when it appeared to have its fan favourite character murder a small, adorable child he claims to love. We viewers were given an entire commercial break to stew in that plot development and decide how we might feel about Oswald blowing up Martin in an effort to demonstrate just how serious he is about controlling the Gotham underworld."
