= A Beautiful Darkness =

- Gotham episode
- Episode no.: Season 4 Episode 13
- Directed by: John Stephens
- Written by: Tze Chun
- Cinematography by: David Stockton
- Editing by: Barrie Wise
- Production code: T40.10013
- Original air date: March 8, 2018
- Running time: 43 minutes

Guest appearances
- Cameron Monaghan as Jerome Valeska; Peyton List as Ivy Pepper

Episode chronology
← Previous "Pieces of a Broken Mirror"	Next → "Reunion"
- Gotham season 4

"A Beautiful Darkness" is the thirteenth episode of the fourth season and 79th episode overall from the Fox series Gotham. The show is itself based on the characters created by DC Comics set in the Batman mythology. The episode was written by Tze Chun and directed by executive producer John Stephens. It was first broadcast on March 8, 2018.

In the episode, Ivy goes after many people involved in a Wayne Enterprises project only known as "Project M", which affects her plants. After Selina abandons her, she uses her new powers on Bruce, who receives a precognitive glimpse from his future. Gordon sets to stop her before she affects Fox. Meanwhile, Penguin meets Jerome in Arkham and begins to uncover his sinister plans.

The episode received positive reviews with critics praising Taylor's and Monaghan's performances and chemistry as well as the Arkham storyline. However, the dream sequences received criticism.

== Plot ==
Ivy (Peyton List) begins to investigate "Project M", which is being conducted at Wayne Enterprises and involves the experimentation and deaths of several plants, much to her anger. After she murders a Wayne Enterprises employee, a horrified Selina (Camren Bicondova) abandons her. Ivy then visits Bruce (David Mazouz) and, after hypnotizing him with a kiss, poisons him, causing him to hallucinate his closest friends and allies along with a mysterious cloaked figure, who reveals to Bruce that he is a manifestation of him formed by his grief and sorrow after his parents' deaths. Simultaneously, Ivy hypnotizes Fox (Chris Chalk) and forces him to take her to the laboratory where Project M is being conducted and she collects a sample of the Lazarus water that is being used in the experiments before escaping.

Gordon (Ben McKenzie) tracks them down and rescues Fox before collecting the antidote and rescuing Bruce, who believes that he has seen his future. Ivy also uses the Lazarus water to create a new flower that can immediately kill someone upon contact with the petals. Meanwhile, Jerome (Cameron Monaghan) pesters Oswald (Robin Lord Taylor) in Arkham and he subjects him to numerous humiliating tasks in order to turn him insane and upon learning that Jerome is intending on escaping and wreaking havoc in Gotham, Oswald decides to use that to escape.

== Production ==
=== Development ===
In March 2018, it was announced that the thirteenth episode of the season would be titled "A Beautiful Darkness" and was to be written by Tze Chun and directed by executive producer John Stephens.

=== Casting ===
Jessica Lucas and Drew Powell don't appear in the episode as their respective characters. In March 2018, it was announced that the guest cast for the episode would include Cameron Monaghan as Jerome Valeska, and Peyton List as Ivy Pepper.

== Reception ==
=== Viewers ===
The episode was watched by 2.41 million viewers with a 0.7/3 share among adults aged 18 to 49. This was a 7% decrease in viewership from the previous episode, which was watched by 2.57 million viewers with a 0.8/3 in the 18-49 demographics. With these ratings, Gotham ranked first for Fox, beating Showtime at the Apollo, fifth on its timeslot, and thirteenth for the night, behind Champions, How to Get Away with Murder, S.W.A.T., Superstore, Will & Grace, Scandal, Chicago Fire, Life in Pieces, Mom, Grey's Anatomy, Young Sheldon, and The Big Bang Theory.

With DVR factored in, the episode was viewed by 3.93 million viewers.
