= Queen Takes Knight =

- Gotham episode
- Episode no.: Season 4 Episode 11
- Directed by: Danny Cannon
- Written by: John Stephens
- Cinematography by: Scott Kevan
- Editing by: Leland Sexton
- Production code: T40.10011
- Original air date: December 7, 2017
- Running time: 43 minutes

Guest appearances
- Cameron Monaghan as Jerome Valeska; Michael Cerveris as Lazlo Valentin / Professor Pyg; John Doman as Carmine Falcone; Anthony Carrigan as Victor Zsasz

Episode chronology
← Previous "Things That Go Boom"	Next → "Pieces of a Broken Mirror"
- Gotham season 4

"Queen Takes Knight" is the eleventh episode and midseason finale of the fourth season and 77th episode overall from the Fox series Gotham. The show is itself based on the characters created by DC Comics set in the Batman mythology. The episode was written by executive producer John Stephens and directed by Danny Cannon. It was first broadcast on December 7, 2017.

In the episode, the gang war between Cobblepot and Sofia Falcone is intensifying. Carmine Falcone's arrival to the city jeopardizes Sofia's plans to seize control of the city, and Gordon is set to end both conflicts. Meanwhile, Bruce's recent behavior and his new attitude bring a new conflict with Alfred, which ends in tragedy.

The episode received mostly positive reviews from critics, who praised Falcone's fate, Crystal Reed's performance in the episode and Monaghan's return to the show for the winter finale.

== Plot ==
James Gordon and the GCPD find a doctor barely alive after having survived a surgery performed by Lazlo Valentin. Also, Sofia Falcone has been causing many problems with the gang war with Oswald Cobblepot.

Sofia encounters her father Carmine Falcone in his manor along with Barbara Kean, Tabitha Galavan and Selina Kyle. He is furious at Sofia for her actions as well as her relationship with Gordon. Falcone then has Cobblepot take Sofia out of Gotham, with the intention to have her killed if she ever returns. Gordon arrives at the manor to see Sofia getting escorted out with her belongings. Just then, a van pulls up and men in black ski masks open fire, killing Falcone, shooting Sofia in the stomach, and kidnapping Tabitha, Barbara and Selina.

Rumors begin circulating that Cobblepot had Falcone killed, which he denies. Later, Gordon, Sofia, Cobblepot and Victor Zsasz attend Falcone's funeral. Gordon is told by Harvey Bullock that he will need solid evidence in order to arrest Cobblepot as his arrest will lead to an even more peaceful city. Sofia decides to testify that Cobblepot "killed" Martin in order to have him arrested. Zsasz acts as a witness to the event and testifies against Cobblepot, who is finally arrested by the GCPD. Meanwhile, they cave in on Penguin's lair, resulting in a firefight between the police and penguin's henchmen. Tabitha, Barbara, and Selina are seen in the background all three bound in chairs. Penguin's men are eventually defeated and the cops come and untie them. Afterwards, Sofia gives the Iceberg Lounge to Barbara, Tabitha and Selina.

After Bruce Wayne is cited for a noise complaint, he is finally confronted by Alfred Pennyworth for his behavior. The discussion soon escalates to a physical fight which ends when Alfred loses control and punches Bruce, who leaves in an angry fit. Gordon is contacted by Sofia about her plans for the underworld crime and when he visits her, he is confronted by her and Lazlo. Sofia reveals that she had Lazlo sent to the city to act as the serial killer, orchestrated Falcone's death and got herself wounded in order to avoid suspicion. Gordon attacks Lazlo and swears to imprison him in Blackgate Penitentiary but Sofia kills Lazlo, framing Gordon so he can continue being hailed as a hero as well as the Captain, as a part of having control over him. She also reveals that she did it in revenge for her brother's death a year before. He now has the choice to admit Sofia killed Lazlo and chaos will reign in Gotham or get credited for killing him and being hailed as a hero. He decides to choose the second option and tells the GCPD he killed Lazlo, which afterwards pleases Sofia but she warns him that she'll always be keeping an eye on him at all times.

Bruce tells Alfred that he has signed papers removing him as his legal guardian, and threatens to go to the police and report the punches he inflicted on him as a way to get him arrested. Alfred leaves Wayne Manor, no longer the guardian nor butler of the house. While Edward Nygma is being haunted by his alternate Riddler persona, Solomon Grundy is kidnapped by Tabitha and repeatedly hit over the head in an attempt to have him remember her. She ultimately gives up and leaves, but Grundy soon awakens, regaining higher speech and remembering his past life as Butch Gilzean.

Gordon returns to the GCPD and realizes that Bullock has quit his job permanently, leaving his badge and gun in the Captain's office, advising him to take control of the situation within the unit. In Arkham Asylum, Cobblepot yells in his cell, swearing revenge at Sofia, Gordon, and Zsasz when he is confronted by another inmate — Jerome Valeska, who offers to work with him.

== Production ==
=== Development ===
In November 2017, it was announced that the eleventh episode of the season would be titled "Queen Takes Knight" and was to be written by executive producer John Stephens and directed by Danny Cannon.

=== Casting ===
Morena Baccarin, Chris Chalk, and Alexander Siddig don't appear in the episode as their respective characters. In November 2017, it was announced that the guest cast for the episode would include Michael Cerveris as Professor Pyg, Cameron Monaghan as Jerome Valeska, John Doman as Carmine Falcone, and Anthony Carrigan as Victor Zsasz.

== Reception ==
=== Viewers ===
The episode was watched by 2.53 million viewers with a 0.8/3 share among adults aged 18 to 49. This was a slight decrease in viewership from the previous episode, which was watched by 2.59 million viewers with a 0.8/3 in the 18-49 demographics. With these ratings, Gotham ranked second for Fox, behind The Orville, fourth on its timeslot, and eleventh for the night, behind The Great American Baking Show, The Orville, Toy Story That Time Forgot, S.W.A.T., Shrek the Halls, Life in Pieces, Mom, Young Sheldon, The Big Bang Theory, and Thursday Night Football.

=== Critical reviews ===
Professional ratings
Review scores
Source	Rating
IGN	7.5
TV Fanatic	4.0/5.0 stars
TV Overmind	4.5/5.0 stars

"A Dark Knight: Queen Takes Knight" received mostly positive reviews from critics. Matt Fowler of IGN gave the episode a "good" 7.5 out of 10 and wrote in his verdict, "'Queen Takes Knight' didn't always make sense, and the Pyg reveal wasn't the greatest (though it did explain why Pyg felt so different, and underdeveloped), but the rise of Sofia Falcone and the way her storyline managed to put a twisted cap on Jim's original desire to thwart Pax Penguina gave everything a bit of warped closure. Bruce needs another butt-kicking though."

Kyle Fowle of The A.V. Club wrote "With that said, just about everything else in this finale works. I think Bruce’s descent into truly dickish, isolating behavior is severely underexplored, but the moments with Alfred in this episode certainly land. That’s thanks in large part to both David Mazouz and Sean Pertwee, who have an incredible understanding of the relationship between Bruce and Alfred. Watching Alfred do everything he can to keep his friend from slipping over the edge, only to be shunned in the end, is truly heartbreaking stuff."

Nick Hogan of TV Overmind gave the episode a 4.5 star rating out of 5, writing "Overall, this was an extremely strong finish to a mostly strong half of the season. I've never been more excited for the second half of Season 4." Sydney Bucksbaum of The Hollywood Reporter wrote, "Easily one of the best parts of Gotham — used infrequently given his series regular fan-favorite role on Showtime's Shameless — Jerome's return came as a true shock in the final moments of the fall finale. There couldn't have been any better way to keep fans on the hook over the long winter hiatus. The idea of Penguin and Jerome teaming to exact their revenge on Gotham is pretty great. Bring on the insanity!"

Vinnie Mancuso of Collider wrote, "For this episode, all I can say is this: I felt equally devastated when a lost young man fired the one guiding light in his life as I was when a woman shot a flamboyant pig-obsessed serial killer with a southern accent in the back. Gotham is great because Gotham is...a lot." Lisa Babick of TV Fanatic gave the series a 4 star rating out of 5, writing "Girl power! Sofia Falcone showed everyone who was boss on Gotham Season 4 Episode 11 as we learned just how far she was willing to go to take control of Gotham's underbelly. Carmine did a better job of teaching his daughter the ins and outs of criminal activity than he could have ever imagined." Marc Buxton of Den of Geek gave wrote, "But with an important role for the always awesome Zsasz, the return of Jerome, and the death of Carmine Falcone, let’s call this winter finale a win."
