= Reunion (Gotham) =

- Gotham episode
- Episode no.: Season 4 Episode 14
- Directed by: Annabelle K. Frost
- Written by: Peter Blake
- Cinematography by: Scott Kevan
- Editing by: Leland Sexton
- Production code: T40.10014
- Original air date: March 15, 2018
- Running time: 43 minutes

Guest appearances
- Peyton List as Ivy Pepper; J.W. Cortes as Detective Alvarez; Stu "Large" Riley as Sampson

Episode chronology
← Previous "A Beautiful Darkness"	Next → "The Sinking Ship The Grand Applause"
- Gotham season 4

"Reunion" is the fourteenth episode of the fourth season and 80th episode overall from the Fox series Gotham. The show is itself based on the characters created by DC Comics set in the Batman mythology. The episode was written by Peter Blake and directed by co-executive producer Annabelle K. Frost. It was first broadcast on March 15, 2018.

In the episode, Ivy decides to go against everyone who harmed her, targeting the Wayne Enterprises foundation charity event. Meanwhile, Nygma continues suffering a mental breakdown regarding his split personality, causing him to consider suicide. Bruce also continues pursuing Alfred to return to his old position to little to no success while Lee meets with Sofia to talk about business.

== Plot ==
Bruce (David Mazouz) burns down his vigilante's mask. He then goes to meet Alfred (Sean Pertwee), who refuses to return until he shows him "he's changed." Meanwhile, Ivy (Peyton List) arrives at a bar where she uses her plants to hypnotize and kill the bystanders.

Lee (Morena Baccarin) meets with Sofia (Crystal Reed), who wants a sizable part of the Narrows' control. Gordon (Ben McKenzie) and the GCPD investigate the bar incident and discover that Ivy is responsible, intending to kill Bullock (Donal Logue) for her father's death. At Bullock's apartment, the GCPD watches as Ivy makes a broadcasting message throughout the TV to show her powers. Nygma (Cory Michael Smith) is still getting teased by his personality, to the point he's even considering suicide as a solution to avoid it.

Gordon and Bullock find Ivy on a warehouse but she uses her powers to escape and hold Bullock at her control. After battling Bullock with a gun, Gordon knocks him down, breaking Ivy's control. Bruce attends a charity foundation and runs into Alfred, who states that he needs to accept "who he really is." Ivy interrupts the event and uses her plant to kill many people at the event when the GCPD arrives. Bruce dons a suit and rescues many people before being shot by Gordon, but he survives because he is wearing a bulletproof vest and manages to escape. Afterwards, Bruce finally makes up with Alfred, who returns to the mansion. Ivy returns home and is confronted by Selina Kyle (Camren Bicondova). After a tense standoff where they both threaten to kill each other, Selina convinces Ivy to give up the last vial of the Lazarus Water that she uses to grow her plants and destroys it.

Sofia meets again with Lee, who refuses her offer for control of the Narrows. Sofia then kills her bodyguard and smashes Lee's hand with a hammer, stating she now has control of the Narrows, putting Sampson (Stu "Large" Riley) as the new head. Nygma opts to return to Arkham instead. However, Cobblepot (Robin Lord Taylor) reappears and he reveals to him that he had specifically written the letter so that his dual personality would read it and take Nygma back to Arkham. With Bullock back on the precinct, Gordon vows to take Sofia down.

== Production ==
=== Development ===
In March 2018, it was announced that the fourteenth episode of the season would be titled "Reunion" and was to be written by Peter Blake and directed by co-executive producer Annabelle K. Frost.

=== Casting ===
Erin Richards, Jessica Lucas, and Alexander Siddig don't appear in the episode as their respective characters. In March 2018, it was announced that the guest cast for the episode would include Peyton List as Ivy Pepper, and Stu "Large" Riley as Sampson.

== Reception ==
=== Viewers ===
The episode was watched by 2.55 million viewers with a 0.6/2 share among adults aged 18 to 49. This was a 5% increase in viewership from the previous episode, which was watched by 2.41 million viewers with a 0.7/3 in the 18–49 demographics. With these ratings, Gotham ranked first for Fox, beating Showtime at the Apollo, fourth on its timeslot, and tenth for the night, behind a Chicago Fire rerun, Champions, A.P. Bio, How to Get Away with Murder, Superstore, Scandal, Will & Grace, an NCAA game, and Grey's Anatomy.

With DVR factored in, the episode was viewed by 4.00 million viewers with a 1.2 in the 18–49 demo.
