= One of My Three Soups =

- Gotham episode
- Episode no.: Season 4 Episode 16
- Directed by: Ben McKenzie
- Written by: Charlie Huston
- Cinematography by: Scott Kevan
- Editing by: Barrie Wise
- Production code: T40.10016
- Original air date: March 29, 2018
- Running time: 43 minutes

Guest appearances
- Cameron Monaghan as Jerome Valeska; Benedict Samuel as Jervis Tetch; Kelcy Griffin as Detective Harper; David W. Thompson as Jonathan Crane / The Scarecrow; Shiva Kalaiselvan as Lelia; John Treacy Egan as Zachary Trumble

Episode chronology
← Previous "The Sinking Ship The Grand Applause"	Next → "Mandatory Brunch Meeting"
- Gotham season 4

"One of My Three Soups" is the sixteenth episode of the fourth season and 82nd episode overall from the Fox series Gotham. The show is itself based on the characters created by DC Comics set in the Batman mythology. The episode was written by consulting producer Charlie Huston and directed by main cast member Ben McKenzie. It was first broadcast on March 29, 2018.

In the episode, Jerome Valeska, Jervis Tetch, Jonathan Crane and 80 inmates escape from Arkham Asylum to wreak havoc on Gotham. Tetch orchestrates a gigantic hypnosis trick that could kill everyone while Gordon and Bullock try to stop him. Also, Jerome is looking for his abusive uncle to get information but is pursued by Bruce, who feels responsible for his actions. Meanwhile, Barbara learns more information regarding her resurrection.

== Plot ==
Using hypnosis, Tetch (Benedict Samuel) manages to get a prison guard to escape, along with Jonathan Crane (David W. Thompson). They then orchestrate a break, freeing Jerome (Cameron Monaghan) as well as 84 inmates from Arkham Asylum.

When Gordon (Ben McKenzie) and Bullock (Donal Logue) investigate the escape, they receive a call from Tetch, telling them to meet him at an address. There, Gordon and Bullock are subdued by hypnotized people while Tetch has a wrecking ball fall on a married couple, crushing them before escaping. Meanwhile, Barbara (Erin Richards) experiences a flashback to the time when Ra's al Ghul (Alexander Siddig) resurrected her, where he sees her as his true heir to the Demon's Head.

After retrieving Jerome's file with the help of Selina (Camren Bicondova), Bruce (David Mazouz) heads to the diner owned by Jerome's uncle. The uncle, Zachary Trumble (John Treacy Egan) has already been intercepted by Jerome, who reprimands him for his abuse. Zachary tricks Jerome and has his protector Lunkhead hold him down while he pours hot soup over Jerome's face as revenge for murdering Lila Valeska, who is Zachary's sister. Bruce interrupts and is attacked by Lunkhead while Jerome kills his uncle after learning the location of someone he is searching for. Selina arrives and tries to shoot Jerome but Bruce stops her, as he feels responsible for Jerome, prompting Jerome to escape.

Soon, Gordon and Bullock find that the city is now filled with hypnotized people ready to jump off their balconies. They soon find that the people were hypnotized through a radio message. Bullock hears the station in order to find where the signal is coming from and is hypnotized himself. Gordon finally finds the station and stops Tetch from continuing the message. He uses a loophole and prompts the citizens to save each other, breaking the hypnosis. Tetch is arrested afterwards.

Members of the League of Shadows arrive at the Sirens, looking for the new Demon's Head. Upon finding it's Barbara, they turn against her, as they refuse to be led by a woman. The female members kill the male members and accept Barbara as their new Demon's Head. While on route to Arkham, Tetch's truck is hijacked by Crane and Jerome, who drive to the location Zachary Trumble gave him.

== Production ==
=== Development ===
In January 2018, it was announced that Ben McKenzie would direct an episode after making his directional debut the previous season. In March 2018, it was announced that the sixteenth episode of the season would be titled "One of My Three Soups" and was to be written by Charlie Huston and directed by Ben McKenzie.

=== Casting ===
Morena Baccarin, Sean Pertwee, Robin Lord Taylor, Cory Michael Smith, Chris Chalk, Drew Powell and Crystal Reed don't appear in the episode as their respective characters. In March 2018, it was announced that the guest cast for the episode would include David W. Thompson as Jonathan Crane, Benedict Samuel as Jervis Tetch, Cameron Monaghan as Jerome Valeska, Kelcy Griffin as Detective Harper, John Treacy Egan as Zachary Trumble and Shiva Kalaiselvan as Lelia.

== Reception ==
=== Viewers ===
The episode was watched by 2.39 million viewers with a 0.7/3 share among adults aged 18 to 49. This was a slight decrease in viewership from the previous episode, which was watched by 2.47 million viewers with a 0.7/3 in the 18-49 demographics. With these ratings, Gotham ranked first for Fox, beating Showtime at the Apollo, fourth on its timeslot, and twelfth for the night, behind Scandal, S.W.A.T., Superstore, Will & Grace, Chicago Fire, Life in Pieces, Station 19, Mom, Grey's Anatomy, Young Sheldon, and The Big Bang Theory.

With DVR factored in, the episode was viewed by 3.86 million viewers with a 1.3 in the 18-49 demo.
