= Stop Hitting Yourself =

- Gotham episode
- Episode no.: Season 4 Episode 8
- Directed by: Rob Bailey
- Written by: Charlie Huston
- Cinematography by: Scott Kevan
- Editing by: Leland Sexton
- Production code: T40.10008
- Original air date: November 9, 2017
- Running time: 43 minutes

Guest appearances
- Camila Perez as Bridgit Pike / Firefly; Marina Benedict as Cherry; Larry Pine as Mayor Burke; Christopher Convery as Martin

Episode chronology
← Previous "A Day in the Narrows"	Next → "Let Them Eat Pie"
- Gotham season 4

"Stop Hitting Yourself" is the eight episode of the fourth season and 74th episode overall from the Fox series Gotham. The show is itself based on the characters created by DC Comics set in the Batman mythology. The episode was written by consulting producer Charlie Huston on his writing debut and directed by Rob Bailey. It was first broadcast on November 9, 2017.

In the episode, Gordon and Bullock's friendship is coming to a conclusion amidst the chaos following the previous episode's actions. Gordon is offered the position of Captain of the GCPD but he is hesitant about the situation. Meanwhile, Barbara, Tabitha and Selina are dispatched by Cobblepot to go and bring back Nygma after discovering he is making fun of him the fight club. However, Solomon's memories begin to return, which may threaten their business in the fight club. Also, Gordon finally confronts Sofia Falcone.

The episode received positive reviews from critics, who praised McKenzie's and Logue's performance in the episode, especially their final confrontation as well as the character development.

== Plot ==
In the fight club, Nygma (Cory Michael Smith) and Grundy (Drew Powell) poke fun of Cobblepot (Robin Lord Taylor) in a play right before a fight. During the fight, however, Grundy begins to have visions of Tabitha (Jessica Lucas), signaling he may be recovering his memories. He continues fighting and kills the combatant when he rips his arm off and beats him to death with it.

Gordon (Ben McKenzie) is offered the position of Captain by Mayor Burke (Larry Pine) but he remains doubtful. Meanwhile, Cobblepot is notified about Nygma poking fun of him and dispatches Barbara (Erin Richards), Tabitha (Jessica Lucas) and Selina (Camren Bicondova) to go to the Narrows and retrieve Nygma alive to him due to a debt in money. However, he also dispatches Bridgit (Camila Perez) to go after them in case they don't return in time and kill them.

They arrive at the fight club where they get shocked at discovering Grundy, recognizing him as Butch. Tabitha tries to talk him down while Barbara and Selina kidnap Nygma. However, Butch discovers this and tries to fight back until Selina decides that they need to solve this with a fight that will decide who will take Nygma. While visiting the orphanage, Cobblepot finds a mute child named Martin (Christopher Convery) that is bullied by many students in his school and has vengeful tendencies. He teaches him how to make friends and destroy his enemies, causing Cobblepot to realize that Sofia may be using him in the same way he has taught Martin to.

The fight starts between Grundy and Tabitha, Nygma dubbing Tabitha "Tabby the Tigress". Grundy has the upper hand when suddenly, upon being struck by Tabitha with a mace, he briefly recovers his memories and recognizes Tabitha, before losing them again upon being knocked down by Tabitha. Bridgit arrives as the deadline for delivering Nygma finished and prepares to kill them when Lee incapacitates her. For having bailed them to Cobblepot, Cherry (Marina Benedict) is executed by Barbara. Gordon attends a police ceremony in honor of the fallen in the courthouse but when Bullock (Donal Logue) fails to show up, he is forced to start the ceremony without him. After a bitter argument with Bullock, Gordon decides to sign the offer and officially becomes the new Captain of the GCPD's Central Precinct.

After healing Grundy, Lee (Morena Baccarin) is acknowledged by everyone in the fight club as their new leader. Gordon meets with Sofia (Crystal Reed) where he confronts her for everything that happened to make him Captain. She explains that Bullock needed to go. Gordon decides to end his relationship with her for good.

== Production ==
=== Development ===
In October 2017, it was announced that the eight episode of the season would be titled "Stop Hitting Yourself" and was to be written by Charlie Huston and directed by Rob Bailey.

=== Casting ===
David Mazouz, Sean Pertwee, and Alexander Siddig don't appear in the episode as their respective characters. In October 2017, it was announced that the guest cast for the episode would include Michael Maize as Grady Harris, Marina Benedict as Cherry, Camila Perez as Firefly, Christopher Convery as Martin, and Larry Pine as Mayor Burke.

== Reception ==
=== Viewers ===
The episode was watched by 2.70 million viewers with a 0.9/3 share among adults aged 18 to 49. This was a slight decrease in viewership from the previous episode, which was watched by 2.75 million viewers with a 0.9/3 in the 18-49 demographics. With these ratings, Gotham ranked second for Fox, behind The Orville, fourth on its timeslot, and tenth for the night, behind How to Get Away with Murder, S.W.A.T., The Orville, Scandal, Life in Pieces, Mom, Grey's Anatomy, Young Sheldon, The Big Bang Theory, and Thursday Night Football.

=== Critical reviews ===
Professional ratings
Review scores
Source	Rating
IGN	7.7
TV Fanatic	4.0/5.0 stars
TV Overmind	5.0/5.0 stars

"A Dark Knight: Stop Hitting Yourself" received positive reviews from critics. Matt Fowler of IGN gave the episode a "good" 7.7 out of 10 and wrote in his verdict, "'Stop Hitting Yourself' was totally loony, focusing mostly on the show's peripheral midway players while still giving us some big moments along with the silly, soapy side quest."

Kyle Fowle of The A.V. Club wrote "Gotham is really setting itself up nicely for a midseason finale, whenever that happens to be. For the first time since the show's inception, multiple storylines are unfolding at a solid pace, the characters feel fresh and interesting, and there's a clarity to the storytelling that's more than welcome. Sofia's plans continuing to solidify should only bolster what's been a marked improvement for the show in its fourth season."

Nick Hogan of TV Overmind gave the episode a perfect 5 star rating out of 5, writing "Overall, this may have been my favorite episode of Gotham ever. If not ever, DEFINITELY this season." Sydney Bucksbaum of The Hollywood Reporter wrote, " It was as if everyone was competing for the wackiest storyline, and everyone delivered. Gotham has finally found its sweet spot: losing the seriousness and just having all-out fun."

Vinnie Mancuso of Collider wrote, "Tonight's Gotham is titled 'Stop Hitting Yourself,' which is literally just what these Mad Max-ass mole people chant in an underground fighting pit whenever Solomon Grundy rips a dude's arm off and then bludgeons that same dude to death with that same arm. That is such a common occurrence that it garnered an original chant. This show is art." Lisa Babick of TV Fanatic gave the series a 4 star rating out of 5, writing "I always love a good scene between Lee and Babs, and 'Stop Hitting Yourself' didn't disappoint. It wasn't a huge scene, but it afforded Lee an opportunity to knock Babs around a bit." Marc Buxton of Den of Geek gave wrote, "So lots of new intrigues this week as Gotham takes little bits and pieces of the DC Universe, sticks them in a blender, and just lets it spin. It's a guilty pleasure and it's a load of yucks as Gotham continues to take glee in being a really fun mess."
