= Penguin's Umbrella =

- Gotham episode
- Episode no.: Season 1 Episode 7
- Directed by: Rob Bailey
- Written by: Bruno Heller
- Production code: 4X6657
- Original air date: November 3, 2014

Guest appearances
- David Zayas as Salvatore "Sal" Maroni; Richard Kind as Mayor Aubrey James; Drew Powell as Butch Gilzean; Jeremy Davidson as Nikolai; Makenzie Leigh as Liza; Danny Mastrogiorgio as Frankie Carbone; Anthony Carrigan as Victor Zsasz; Mekia Cox as Dr. Thawson

Episode chronology
← Previous "Spirit of the Goat"	Next → "The Mask"

"Penguin's Umbrella" is the seventh episode of the television series Gotham. It premiered on FOX on November 3, 2014 and was written by series developer Bruno Heller, and directed by Rob Bailey. In this episode, the mob war escalates while Cobblepot (Robin Lord Taylor) reveals a new component of his manipulative strategy, forcing Gordon (Ben McKenzie) to deal with the consequences of his decision to spare Penguin's life.

The episode was watched by 6.63 million viewers, an improvement over the previous episode and received critical acclaim from critics, praising the deviation of the "villain of the week" concept.

== Plot ==
Mooney (Jada Pinkett Smith), outraged to know Cobblepot (Robin Lord Taylor) is alive, tells Butch (Drew Powell) to kill him. In the GCPD locker room, Gordon (Ben McKenzie) calls Barbara (Erin Richards), telling her to meet him at the bus station as soon as possible. He is then attacked by Bullock (Donal Logue), who plans to kill him and bring his body to Falcone (John Doman) as a clemency. Gordon returns to his apartment to find Barbara held hostage by Butch and an enforcer. When Butch threatens to kill Barbara, he kills the enforcer and knocks out Butch. He then takes Barbara to a bus station, telling her to leave Gotham for a time.

Gordon tries to get an arrest warrant for Falcone and Mayor James (Richard Kind) but finds little support from Essen (Zabryna Guevara). Falcone sends Victor Zsasz (Anthony Carrigan) to bring Gordon to him but he is saved by Montoya (Victoria Cartagena) and Allen (Andrew Stewart-Jones). Cobblepot, Frankie Carbone (Danny Mastrogiorgio) and henchmen arrive at a warehouse where they kill Falcone's ally, Nikolai (Jeremy Davidson). When Carbone reveals his intent to murder Cobblepot, Cobblepot then reveals Carbone's henchmen have allied with him for a raise, and stabs him fatally.

Gordon realizes Zsasz has Barbara in custody and goes to talk with Falcone. After a talk, they manage to free Barbara. In Falcone's mansion, he is visited by Cobblepot. In flashbacks to the day Falcone saved Gordon and Bullock, he talked with an imprisoned Cobblepot, curious as to any other secrets he possessed. In exchange for these, Cobblepot requested being assigned to Gordon for his execution, in hopes of being spared to integrate into Maroni's circle. Learning that Mooney and Nikolai had been planning to kill him and usurp him, Falcone remarks that their present plans have played out well, but that he considers Gordon concerning. Oswald, however, thanks him for the gesture, suggesting that Gordon has a further role to play in their endeavors.

== Reception ==
=== Viewers ===
The episode was watched by 6.63 million viewers, with a 2.4 rating among 18-49 adults. With Live+7 DVR viewing factored in, the episode had an overall rating of 10.47 million viewers, and a 4.1 in the 18–49 demographic.

=== Critical reviews ===
Professional ratings
Review scores
Source	Rating
Rotten Tomatoes	88%
The A.V. Club	B−
Paste Magazine	8.0
TV Fanatic	3.8/5 stars
IGN	8.5
New York Magazine	4/5 stars

"Penguin's Umbrella" received critical acclaim. The episode received a rating of 88% based on reviews from 26 critics, on the review aggregator Rotten Tomatoes, with the site's consensus stating: "Although 'Penguin's Umbrella' is a departure from the 'Case of the Week" form, Gotham finally lives up to its potential with a gritty serialized episode about a handful of key characters."

Matt Fowler of IGN gave the episode a "great" 8.5 out of 10 and wrote in his verdict, "'Penguin's Umbrella' wasn't a perfect episode, but it was the best Gotham's had to offer so far. I'm not sure how Penguin got to walk right out of the precinct after bowing and saying 'Hello,' and again, it will seem weird to see Gordon, after everything, simply return to work - but the complete focus on immediate mob-related dangers and corruption, without having a 'case of the week' to distract from the seasonal arc, felt like the best course for this series. And, stemming from this, the whole 'no cop or lawyer will help' freeze out will probably start to thaw as allies come out of the woodwork."

The A.V. Club's Kyle Fowle gave the episode a "B−" grade and wrote, "Last week's episode included a bit of character backstory, and mostly stuck to a straightforward storyline, and the result, as Oliver Sava pointed out, was the season's strongest episode to date. While tonight's episode may not live up to its potentially explosive title, 'Penguin's Umbrella,' it once again shows that Gotham can craft an intriguing and compelling hour of television when it slows down its pace and focuses on juggling just a few characters and storylines at a time."

Simon Abrams of Vulture.com gave the film 4/5 and despite minor problems praised the episode for finally delivering "a serialized neo-noir with Godfather-size scope that also happens to be set in Batman’s world". Abrams called it the best episode so far, and concludes "one can only hope for more where this came from."
