= The Mask (Gotham) =

- Gotham episode
- Episode no.: Season 1 Episode 8
- Directed by: Paul Edwards
- Written by: John Stephens
- Production code: 4X6658
- Original air date: November 10, 2014

Guest appearances
- Todd Stashwick as Richard Sionis; Makenzie Leigh as Liza; Cole Vallis as Tommy Elliot; Frank Deal as Dr. Felton; Orlagh Cassidy as Mrs. Lawson; Carol Kane as Gertrude Kapelput

Episode chronology
← Previous "Penguin's Umbrella"	Next → "Harvey Dent"

"The Mask" is the eighth episode of the television series Gotham. It premiered on FOX on November 10, 2014 and was written by John Stephens, and directed by Paul Edwards. In this episode, Gordon (Ben McKenzie) and Bullock (Donal Logue) investigate a killer with a fight club while Bruce (David Mazouz) returns to the school since the death of his parents.

The episode was watched by 6.35 million viewers and received positive reviews with critics commenting on Bruce's storyline.

== Reception ==
=== Viewers ===
The episode was watched by 6.35 million viewers, with a 2.2 rating among 18-49 adults. With Live+7 DVR viewing factored in, the episode had an overall rating of 10.03 million viewers, and a 3.8 in the 18–49 demographic.

=== Critical reviews ===
Professional ratings
Review scores
Source	Rating
Rotten Tomatoes (Tomatometer)	83%
The A.V. Club	C+
Paste Magazine	6.0
TV Fanatic	3.2/5 stars
IGN	7.8
New York Magazine	3/5 stars

"The Mask" received positive reviews. The episode received a rating of 83% on the review aggregator Rotten Tomatoes, with the site's consensus stating: "The appearance of a familiar Batman villain and a bullying scene at Bruce's school make 'The Mask' an important episode, though it returns to Gotham's procedural format."

Matt Fowler of IGN gave the episode a "good" 7.8 out of 10 and wrote in his verdict, "The 'case of the week' and Barbara's decision to unravel into a mess and leave Jim again (!) - which felt like the show was purposefully giving up on her and forcing her out more than anything - gave us plenty to roll our eyes at this week. But the fact that Gordon's relationship with his co-workers had become a critical topic was excellent. As was, believe it or not, Bruce's bully story. Kid Wayne still hasn't quite found his place on the series, but this was a spectacular moment between him and Alfred. With Alfred finally figuring out how, with his limited parenting skills, he could best help young Master Wayne."

The A.V. Club's Oliver Sava gave the episode a "C+" grade and wrote, "Very little comes of the procedural this week. It may not be as ludicrous as the Balloonman, but there's little to no stakes here. Sure, Gotham tries its damnedest to get us to care about Gordon's ongoing battle to 'stand up for the city,' giving Bullock a speech (though he wouldn't call it a speech) that rouses the police force to spread out across the city and find Gordon, who's gone missing while investigating the fight club. When Sarah Essen shows up at the episode's end and helps save Gordon, it doesn't feel like a triumph of the system, or a sudden turn for the GCPD towards actual policing. Instead, it's a tidy end to an episode that's supposed to make us cheer for Gordon, but only continues to outline how sloppy and inconsequential these procedural storylines can be. Where’s the tension or insight?"
