= Michael Cerveris =

American actor (born 1960)

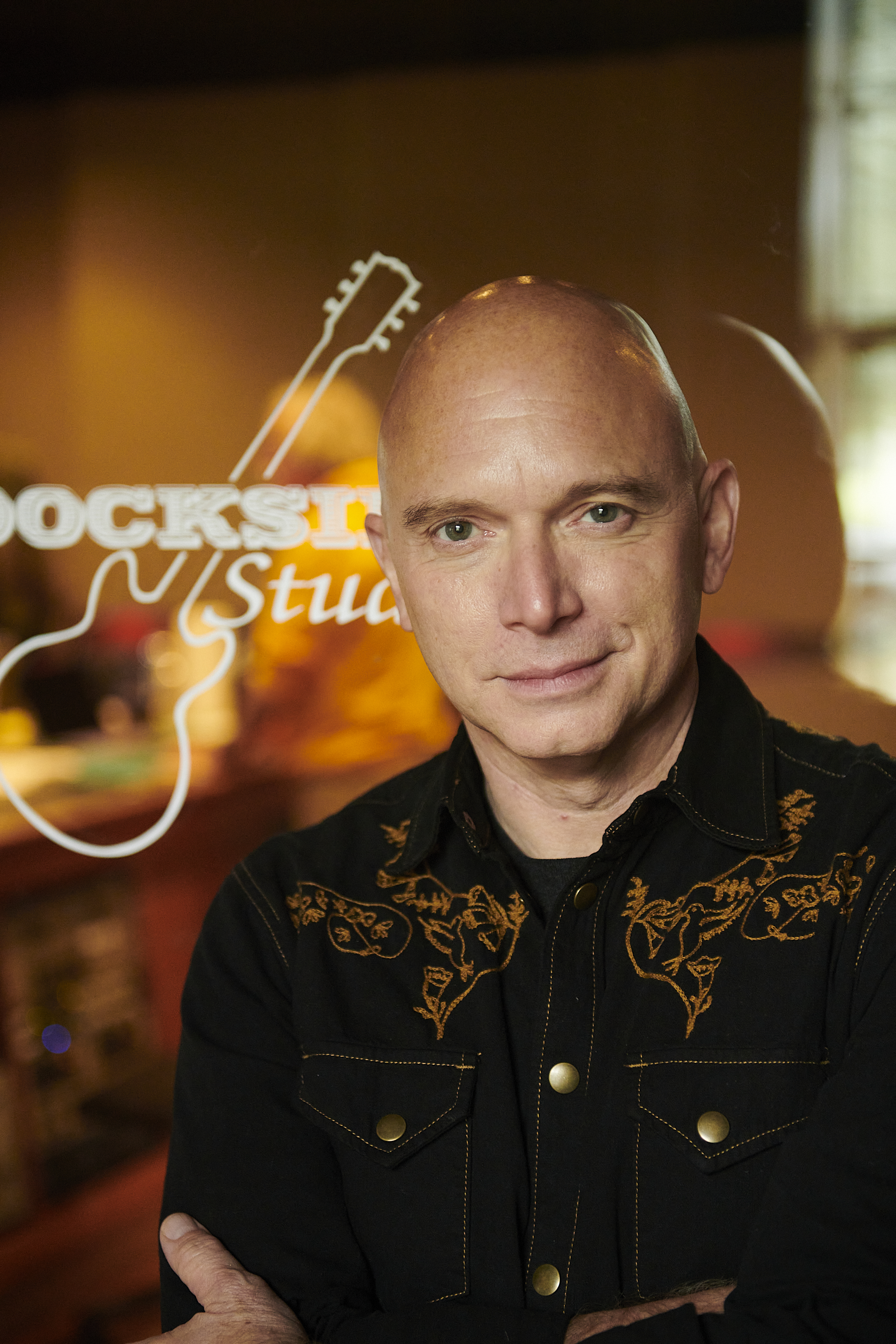
- Born: November 6, 1960 (age 66); Bethesda, Maryland, U.S.
- Education: Yale University
- Occupations: Actor, Singer, Songwriter, Guitarist
- Years active: 1983–present
- Known for: Fun Home
- Website: www.amazing-journey.com

Michael Cerveris Jr. (born November 6, 1960) is an American actor, singer, songwriter, and guitarist. He has performed in many stage musicals and plays, including several Stephen Sondheim musicals: Assassins, Sweeney Todd: The Demon Barber of Fleet Street, Sunday in the Park with George, Road Show, and Passion. In 2004, Cerveris won the Tony Award for Best Featured Actor in a Musical for Assassins as John Wilkes Booth. In 2015, he won his second Tony Award for Best Actor in a Musical for Fun Home as Bruce Bechdel.

He was called, by Playbill, "arguably the most versatile leading man on Broadway", playing roles from "Shakespeare's Romeo to The Who's Tommy, from the German transsexual rock diva Hedwig in Hedwig and the Angry Inch to the homicidal title character of Sondheim's Sweeney Todd."

Cerveris' most visible television roles to date have included Deputy Director Ted Gunn in David Fincher's Mindhunter for Netflix, Watson, valet to George Russell, in Julian Fellowes' The Gilded Age for HBO, and the Observer code-named September in the FOX science fiction television series Fringe. His character, a mysterious man seen attending many unusual events, appeared regularly during the series and became one of the main characters to bring the story to its end.

== Early life ==
Cerveris was born in Bethesda, Maryland, and raised in Huntington, West Virginia. His mother, Marsha (née Laycock), was a dancer, and his father, Michael Cerveris Sr. was an Italian American professor of music; the two met while students at the Juilliard School. He is a 1979 graduate of Phillips Exeter Academy and a 1983 cum laude graduate of Yale University, where he was a member of Skull and Bones. He majored in theater studies, and also studied voice.

== Career ==
=== Theatre ===
Broadway and Off-Broadway

Cerveris had roles in several Off-Broadway productions, starting with Macbeth in 1983 as Malcolm and including Total Eclipse in 1985 as Rimbaud at the Westside Theatre, Abingdon Square in 1987 as Frank at the Women's Project, and Blood Sports in 1987 as Nick at the New York Theatre Workshop.

He made his Broadway debut in The Who's Tommy in 1993 as "18-20 year old Tommy/Narrator", receiving a Tony Award nomination as Best Featured Actor in a Musical, Drama League Award nomination, Theater World Award winner, and Original Cast Grammy winner. He had appeared in Tommy in the La Jolla Playhouse prior to Broadway. He next appeared in the Broadway musical Titanic in 1997 as Thomas Andrews. He played the role of John Wilkes Booth in the Broadway musical Assassins in 2004, and won the Tony Award, Best Featured Actor in a Musical and the Outer Critics Circle Award.

In the 2005 Broadway revival of Sweeney Todd: The Demon Barber of Fleet Street Cerveris played the title role, and was nominated for the Tony Award, Drama Desk Award, Outer Critics Circle Award, Drama League Award, and received a Drama Critics Circle citation. In this John Doyle production, the actors also played instruments, with Cerveris playing lyric guitar. In the Broadway musical LoveMusik (2007) he appeared as Kurt Weill, and received Tony, Drama Desk, Outer Critics, and Drama League Award nominations. In 2007 he played Kent in King Lear at the Off-Broadway Public Theater, receiving a Drama League Award nomination. Cerveris played Posthumus Leonatus in the Broadway revival of Cymbeline from December 2, 2007, to January 6, 2008. He appeared Off-Broadway in the Stephen Sondheim-John Weidman musical Road Show at the Public Theater in 2008 as Wilson Mizner. Cerveris appeared opposite Mary-Louise Parker in the limited Roundabout Theatre Company production of Hedda Gabler from January 2009 to March 2009. He next played Dr. Givings in the Broadway comedy by Sarah Ruhl, In the Next Room (or The Vibrator Play), starting in October 2009. From March 2012 to January 2013, Cerveris played Perón in the Broadway revival of Evita. Then, from 2015 to 2016, he played the role of Bruce Bechdel in the Broadway musical Fun Home, winning the 2015 Tony Award for Best Performance by an Actor in a Leading Role in a Musical.

Other venues

In 2000 Cerveris played the lead role of Hedwig in Hedwig and the Angry Inch in the West End. He had previously played the role Off-Broadway from July 8, 1998, to August 4, 1998 and again from February 1999. He was a Garland Award winner, and Ovation Award nominee. During 2002, the Kennedy Center presented a "Sondheim Celebration"; Cerveris appeared in Passion as Giorgio. Cerveris has appeared several times at the Ravinia Festival Concerts (Chicago), including: Passion (2003), Sunday in the Park with George (2004), and Anyone Can Whistle in 2005. He performed in the New York City Center Encores! staged concert of The Apple Tree in 2005, with Kristin Chenoweth.

Cerveris's regional credits include playing Romeo in Romeo and Juliet at the Goodman Theatre opposite Phoebe Cates, Eastern Standard at the Seattle Repertory Theatre with Tom Hulce, and Richard II at the Mark Taper Forum.

=== Film and television ===
Cerveris has appeared in films such as Lulu on the Bridge (1998), The Mexican (2001), Brief Interviews With Hideous Men (2009), Cirque du Freak: The Vampire's Assistant (2009), Stake Land (2010), Detours (2016), and Ant-Man and the Wasp (2018). His television roles include Ian Ware on Fame, Marvin Frey on Treme, State's Attorney James Castro on The Good Wife, Ramses IV on The Tick, Lazlo Valentin/Professor Pyg on Gotham, and September/The Observer on Fringe. Cerveris also appeared as The Observer at several real-life events covered by FOX as part of a viral marketing campaign for the series. These include appearing in the audience at a taping of American Idol, being shown in the stands at various football and NASCAR events, and a cameo in a commercial for Glee. Cerveris appeared as Ted Gunn, head of the Behavioral Science Unit in the second season of Mindhunter.

=== Music career ===
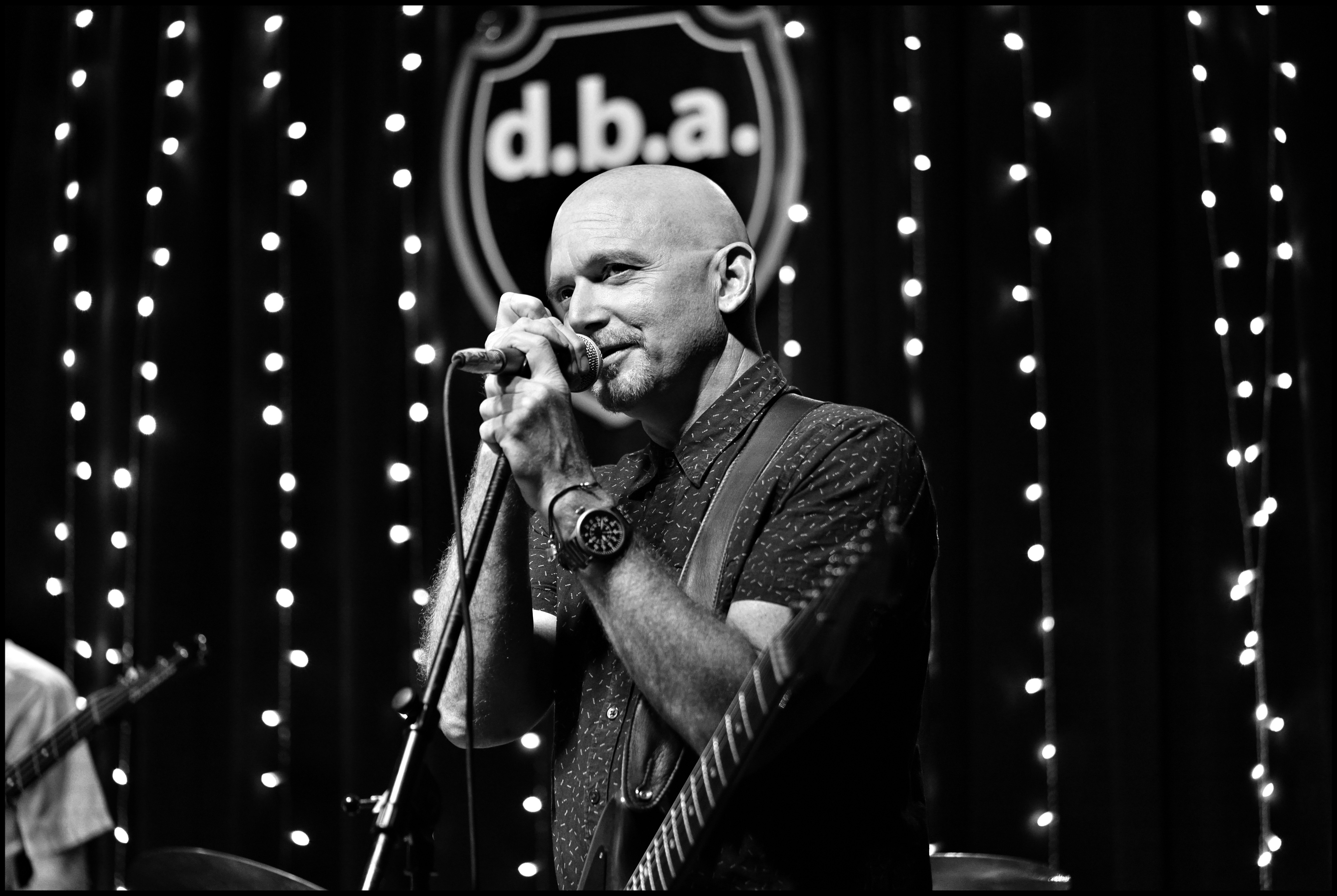
Cerveris performing in New Orleans in 2024

Cerveris played guitar as a member of Bob Mould's touring band supporting the album The Last Dog And Pony Show. A performance at The Forum in London was recorded and released as BobMouldBand: LiveDog98 (Granary Music 2002). His debut solo album, Dog Eared (Low Heat Records 2004), was co-produced with Adam Lasus and includes guest appearances from Norman Blake (Teenage Fanclub), Corin Tucker and Janet Weiss (Sleater-Kinney), Ken Stringfellow (The Posies, R.E.M.), Steve Shelley (Sonic Youth), Kevin March (Guided by Voices), Anders Parker (Varnaline), and Laura Cantrell. In 2011, Cerveris founded the Americana-Country band Loose Cattle with longtime collaborator Kimberly Kaye. Cerveris and Kaye share vocals in the style of Johnny Cash and June Carter Cash. Known for tongue-in-cheek mashups, country covers, and Cerveris' original songs and collaborations with Kaye, the group has gone on to appear at Lincoln Center, Joe's Pub, NPR's Mountain Stage, 54 Below, Chickie Wah Wah's, Siberia, Kajun's Pub, The Blue Note Cafe, Louisiana Music Factory, Rock'n'bowl, Rockwood Music Hall, Webster Hall, New Orleans Jazz and Heritage Festival, French Quarter Festival, AmericanaFest, and many others.

He has also contributed vocals to "My Other Phone Is a Boom Car" as part of a ringtone project by They Might Be Giants for Wired Magazine in March 2007. In They Might Be Giants' 2011 release, Join Us, Cerveris also provided vocals for the track, "Three Might Be Duende."

=== Other activities ===
In 2018 Cerveris was honored by The United States Conference of Mayors and Americans for the Arts with the Citizen Artist Award, presented at the annual Mayors' Conference in Washington DC.

In 2022, he was invited to give the 152nd Commencement Address at Wilson College in Pennsylvania and was presented with an honorary degree, Doctor of Humanities.

Cerveris has performed at many events, to honor or celebrate notable performers and creatives. He performed at The Drama League gala, A Musical Celebration of Broadway on February 7, 2011, which also honored Patti LuPone. In November 2010 he appeared at the Sonnet Repertory Theatre benefit, which honored director Jack O'Brien. On April 27, 2009, he performed at the Signature Theatre gala, a benefit and to celebrate the first annual Sondheim Award.

On December 8, 2010, he took part in the Symphony Space "Selected Shorts and Thalia Book Club" series of readings.

His concert appearances include the Broadway Cabaret Festival, held in October 2010 at The Town Hall (New York).

== Personal life ==
Cerveris was once in a relationship with Beth Ostrosky, an actress who is now married to Howard Stern.

== Work ==
=== Stage roles ===
Michael Cerveris theater credits
Year	Title	Role	Notes
1983	Macbeth	Malcolm	Off-Broadway
1984	The Games	Young Man	Off-Broadway
1984	Total Eclipse	Rimbaud	Off-Broadway
1985	Romeo and Juliet	Romeo	Goodman Theatre
1985	A Midsummer Night's Dream	Puck	Dallas Theater Center
1985	Life Is a Dream	Astolfo	Off-Broadway
1985	Green Fields	Levi-Yitshok	Off-Broadway
1986	The Tooth of Crime	Crow	Hartford Stage
1987	Abingdon Square	Frank	Off-Broadway
1987	Blood Sports	Nick	Off-Broadway
1988	Eastern Standard	Peter Kidde	Seattle Repertory Theatre
1988	Romeo and Juliet	Romeo	Goodman Theatre
1988	Nothing Sacred	Bazarov	Northlight Theatre
1989	Measure for Measure	Claudio	Old Globe Theatre
1991	El Dorado	Nestor	South Coast Repertory
1991	Richard II	Duke of Aumerle	Mark Taper Forum
1992	The Who's Tommy	Tommy / Narrator	La Jolla Playhouse
1993–1995	The Who's Tommy	Tommy / Narrator	Broadway
1995–1996	The Who's Tommy	Tommy / Narrator	Capitol Theater
1997–1998	Titanic: A New Musical	Thomas Andrews	Broadway
1998	Chess	Narrator	Broadway Cares/Equity Fights AIDS Concert
1998–1999	Hedwig and the Angry Inch	Hedwig	Off-Broadway
2000	Hedwig and the Angry Inch	Hedwig	West End
2002	Passion	Giorgio Bachetti	Kennedy Center
2003	Fifth of July	Kenneth Talley	Off-Broadway
2003	Passion	Giorgio Bachetti	Ravinia Festival
2003–2004	A Little Night Music	Count Carl-Magnus Malcolm	Chicago Shakespeare Theater
2004	Assassins	John Wilkes Booth	Broadway
2004	Sunday in the Park with George	Georges Seurat / George	Ravinia Festival
2004	Passion	Giorgio Bachetti	10th Anniversary Concert
2005	Passion	Giorgio Bachetti	Lincoln Center
2005	The Apple Tree	Snake	Off-Broadway; Encores!
2005	Anyone Can Whistle	J. Bowden Hapgood	Ravinia Festival
2005–2006	Sweeney Todd: The Demon Barber of Fleet Street	Sweeney Todd	Broadway
2007	King Lear	Kent	Off-Broadway
2007	LoveMusik	Kurt Weill	Broadway
2007–2008	Cymbeline	Posthumus	Broadway
2008	Road Show	Wilson Mizner	Off-Broadway
2009	Hedda Gabler	Jorgen Tesman	Broadway
2009–2010	In the Next Room (or The Vibrator Play)	Dr. Givings	Broadway
2012–2013	Evita	General Juan Domingo Perón	Broadway
2012	Assassins	John Wilkes Booth	Broadway
2013	Nikolai and the Others	George Balanchine	Off-Broadway
2013	Fun Home	Bruce Bechdel	Off-Broadway
2014	Titanic	Thomas Andrews	Avery Fisher Hall
2014	Faust	Angel Rick	Off-Broadway; Encores!
2015–2016	Fun Home	Bruce Bechdel	Broadway
2019	The Who's Tommy	Tommy	La Jolla Playhouse
2024	Fun Home	Bruce Bechdel	Joe's Pub
2024	Tammy Faye	Jerry Falwell	Broadway
2025	A Christmas Carol	Ebenezer Scrooge	Off-Broadway
2026	Here There Are Blueberries	Peter Wirths and others	Broadway

=== Film roles ===
Michael Cerveris film credits
Year	Title	Role	Notes
1988	Tokyo Pop	Mike	
1990	Strangers	John Reece	
1991	Steel and Lace	Daniel Emerson	
1991	Rock 'n' Roll High School Forever	Eaglebauer	
1992	A Woman, Her Men, and Her Futon	Paul	
1998	Lulu on the Bridge	Restaurant Man #3	
2001	The Mexican	Frank	
2001	Lunchtime Thomas	Thomas	Short film
2004	Temptation	Pablo	
2009	Brief Interviews with Hideous Men	Subject #15	
2009	Cirque du Freak: The Vampire's Assistant	Mr. Tiny	
2010	Meskada	Terrence Lindy	
2010	Stake Land	Jebedia Loven	
2011	Nine Lives: A Musical Adaptation Live	John / Joann Guidos	
2014	Russian Broadway Shut Down	Vladimir Putin	Short film
2014	Leaving Circadia	Reece	
2016	Detours	Bob O'Connor	
2018	Ant-Man and the Wasp	Elihas Starr	
2024	Watchmen Chapter I	Doctor Manhattan / Dr. Jon Osterman, Father (voice)	Direct-to-video
2024	Watchmen Chapter II	Doctor Manhattan / Dr. Jon Osterman, Prison Guard #2 (voices)	Direct-to-video
2026	A Statement	Edward Strohbehn	

=== Television roles ===
Michael Cerveris television credits
Year	Title	Role	Notes
1985	Doubletake	Gary Prine	Miniseries
1986–1987	Fame	Ian Ware	Main cast (season 6); 24 episodes
1987	The Tracey Ullman Show		Episode #1.7
1987	Leg Work	Johnny Dark	Episode: "The Best Couple I Know"
1988	The Equalizer	Frank Fipps	Episode: "Last Call"
1989	The Equalizer	Nick Kaminsky	Episode: "Race Traitors"
1990	Gabriel's Fire	Culp	Episode: "To Catch a Con: Part 2"
1990	21 Jump Street	Ray	Episode: "Back to School"
1991	Quantum Leap	Nick	Episode: "Glitter Rock - April 12, 1974"
1993	Dream On	Bobby Krull	Episode: "And Bobby Makes Three"
2001	CSI: Crime Scene Investigation	Syd Booth Goggle	Episode: "Strip Strangler"
2002	The American Embassy	Gary Forbush	Main cast; 6 episodes
2004	Dr. Vegas	Nick Crowley	Episode: "Lust for Life"
2005	Live from Lincoln Center	Giorgio	Episode: "American Songbook - Passion"
2007	Law & Order: Criminal Intent	Greg Stipe	Episode: "Depths"
2008–2013	Fringe	The Observer / September / Gemini / Donald	Recurring; 40 episodes
2011	Person of Interest	Jarek Koska	Episode: "Judgment"
2011–2013	Treme	Marvin Frey	Recurring (season 2–4); 10 episodes
2014	The Knick	Dr. William Halsted	Episode: "Get the Rope"
2014–2015	The Good Wife	James Castro	Recurring; 10 episodes
2016–2019	Madam Secretary	Congressman Jeff Pearson	2 episodes
2017	The Tick	Ramses IV	Recurring; 5 episodes
2017	Gotham	Lazlo Valentin / Professor Pyg	5 episodes
2018	Mosaic	Tom Davis	Interactive series; 6 episodes
2018	Elementary	Councilman Ledesma	Episode: "How to Get a Head"
2019	Mindhunter	Ted Gunn	Main cast (Season 2)
2019	Prodigal Son	Carter Burkehead	Episode: "Pilot"
2019	The Blacklist	Victor Skovic	3 episodes
2020	The Plot Against America	Mr. Taylor	Episode: "Part 3"
2020–2021	Evil	Devil Therapist (voice)	3 episodes; uncredited
2021	Queen of the South	Simon Durant	Episode: "Mas Dinero Mas Problemas"
2021	Billions	AG Drew Moody	2 episodes
2022–2023	The Gilded Age	Watson	Recurring (season 1); main cast (season 2)

=== Discography ===
- BobMouldBand: LiveDog98 (2002)
- Dog Eared (2004)
- Loose Cattle: North of Houston (2013)
- Loose Cattle: Pony Girl/St James Infirmary (single) (2015)
- Piety (2016)
- Loose Cattle: Seasonal Affective Disorder (2017)
- Loose Cattle: Heavy Lifting (2021)
- Peter Stampfel: Peter Stampfel's 20th Century (2021)
- Loose Cattle: Someone's Monster (2024)
- Loose Cattle: Live Monster (2025)

== Awards and nominations ==
Year	Award	Category	Nominated work	Result
1993	Tony Award	Best Performance by a Featured Actor in a Musical	The Who's Tommy	Nominated
1993	Drama League Award	Distinguished Performance	The Who's Tommy	Nominated
1993	Outer Critics Circle Award	Outstanding Actor in a Musical	The Who's Tommy	Nominated
1993	Theatre World Award		The Who's Tommy	Won
2004	Jeff Award	Actor in a Supporting Role - Musical	A Little Night Music	Nominated
2004	Tony Award	Best Performance by a Featured Actor in a Musical	Assassins	Won
2004	Outer Critics Circle Award	Outstanding Featured Actor in a Musical	Assassins	Won
2006	Tony Award	Best Performance by a Leading Actor in a Musical	Sweeney Todd: The Demon Barber of Fleet Street	Nominated
2006	Drama Desk Award	Outstanding Actor in a Musical	Sweeney Todd: The Demon Barber of Fleet Street	Nominated
2006	Drama League Award	Distinguished Performance	Sweeney Todd: The Demon Barber of Fleet Street	Nominated
2006	Outer Critics Circle Award	Outstanding Actor in a Musical	Sweeney Todd: The Demon Barber of Fleet Street	Nominated
2007	Drama League Award	Distinguished Performance	King Lear	Nominated
2007	Tony Award	Best Performance by a Leading Actor in a Musical	LoveMusik	Nominated
2007	Drama Desk Award	Outstanding Actor in a Musical	LoveMusik	Nominated
2007	Drama League Award	Distinguished Performance	LoveMusik	Nominated
2007	Outer Critics Circle Award	Outstanding Actor in a Musical	LoveMusik	Nominated
2012	Tony Award	Best Performance by a Featured Actor in a Musical	Evita	Nominated
2012	Drama Desk Award	Outstanding Featured Actor in a Musical	Evita	Nominated
2014	Outer Critics Circle Award	Outstanding Actor in a Musical	Fun Home	Won
2015	Tony Award	Best Performance by a Leading Actor in a Musical	Fun Home	Won
2015	Grammy Award	Best Musical Theater Album (principal soloist)	Fun Home	Nominated
2023	Screen Actors Guild Awards	Outstanding Performance by an Ensemble in a Drama Series	The Gilded Age	Nominated
