= David Mazouz =

American actor (born 2001)

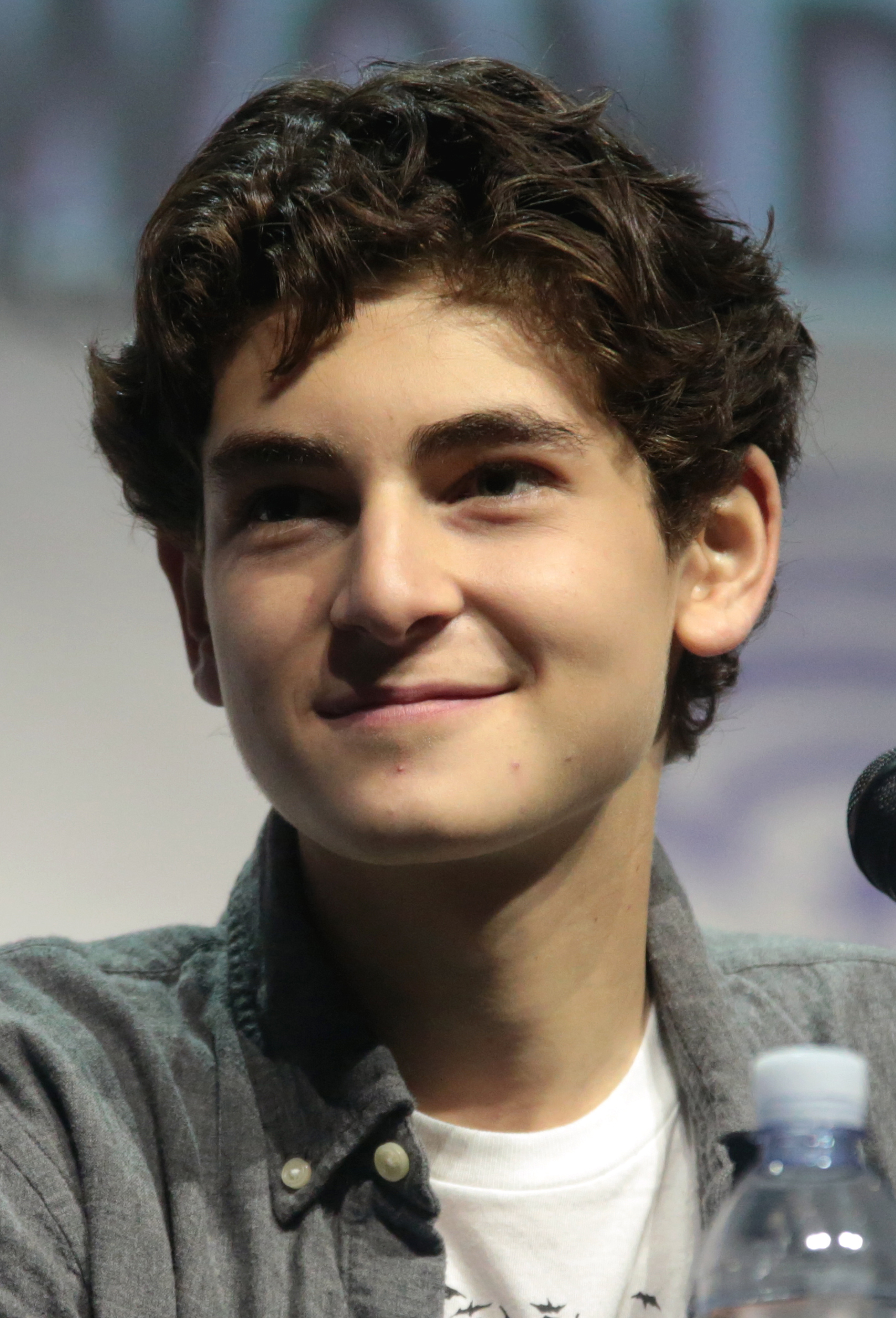
- Mazouz at WonderCon 2017
- Born: David Albert Mazouz; February 19, 2001 (age 25); Los Angeles, California, U.S.
- Education: Stanford University
- Occupation: Actor
- Years active: 2010–present

David Albert Mazouz (/dəˈviːd məˈzuːz/; born February 19, 2001) is an American actor, best known for his leading role as Bruce Wayne in Fox's Batman-prequel TV drama Gotham (2014–2019). Mazouz started his acting career with several guest roles before joining the Fox TV series Touch (2012–2013), for which he was nominated for a Young Artist Award. He has had leading roles in the films The Games Maker and The Darkness.

== Early life ==
Mazouz was born in February 19, 2001, in Los Angeles, California. His father, Michel Mazouz, is a Tunisian Jewish physician, and his mother, Rachel Cohen, is a psychotherapist. Mazouz and his family are of Sephardic Jewish descent. His maternal grandparents are Greek Jews. He has a sister, Rebecca. He was a student at Shalhevet High School, a Modern Orthodox Jewish school, from 2015 to 2019 and appeared in a music video promoting the school. His Bar Mitzvah service was held at the Orthodox Young Israel of Century City in February 2014. In fall 2019, he began attending Stanford University studying economics, psychology, and computer science and graduated in 2023.

A 2014 profile described Mazouz's family as kosher and Shabbat-observant. While filming Gotham in New York, he continued studying Mishnah, Gemara, halakha and Torah with an on-set tutor and through weekly calls with a rabbi.

== Career ==
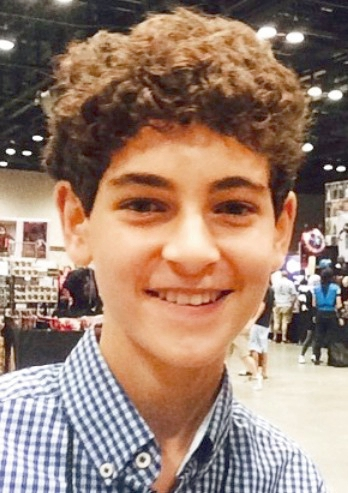
Mazouz in 2015

Mazouz started his career in commercials at age 8. In 2012, he played the role of mute Jacob "Jake" Bohm in the TV series Touch. Mazouz has appeared in several television series including: Mike & Molly, Gotham, The Office, and Criminal Minds. He has also appeared in the ABC show Private Practice as the adopted brother of Betsy.

From 2014 to 2019, Mazouz portrayed a younger version of Bruce Wayne, and eventually the superhero Batman, in Fox's action-crime TV series Gotham. The show explored the young-to-teenage days and the transition to Batman of the famous DC Comics character, as well as the origins of its villains including Penguin, The Riddler, Poison Ivy, and The Joker. He received praise for his performance.

In 2016, he had leading roles in the horror films The Darkness, as Michael Taylor, and Incarnate, as Cameron.

As of September 2026, Mazouz is set to star in an upcoming thriller directed by Carlos V. Gutierrez titled Stealing From Pablo.

== Filmography ==
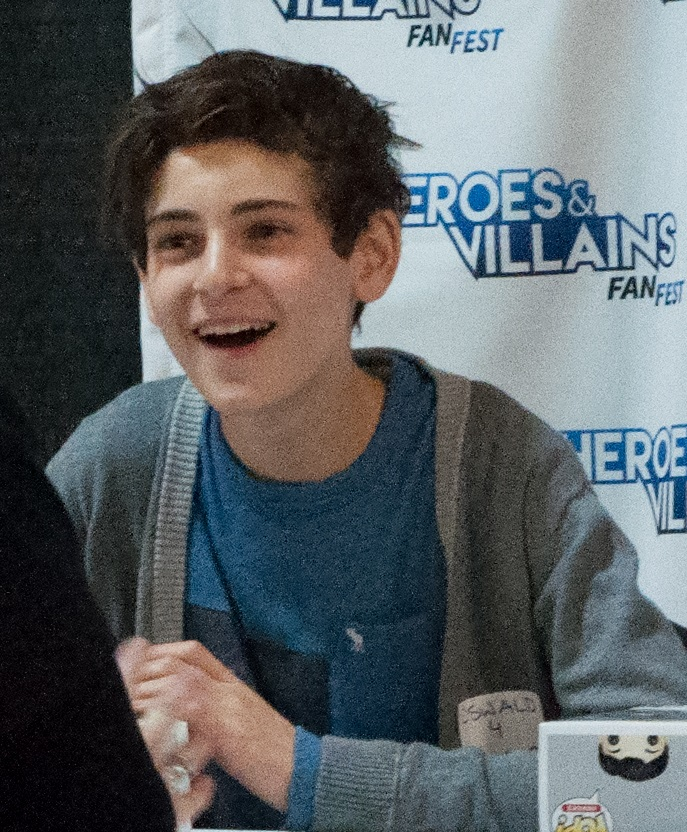
Mazouz in 2016

Mazouz in 2018

=== Film ===
| Year | Title | Role | Notes |
|---|---|---|---|
| 2011 | Coming & Going | Timmy | |
| 2013 | Sanitarium | Steve Mansworth | |
| 2013 | Dear Dumb Diary | Hudson Rivers | Television movie |
| 2014 | The Games Maker | Ivan Drago | |
| 2016 | The Darkness | Michael Taylor | |
| 2016 | Incarnate | Cameron Sparrow | |
| 2021 | The Birthday Cake | Young Gio | |
| 2023 | Nothing, Except Everything. | Miles | Short film |

=== Television ===
| Year | Title | Role | Notes |
|---|---|---|---|
| 2010 | Amish Grace | Andy Roberts | Television film |
| 2010 | Mike & Molly | Randy | Episode: "After the Lovin'" |
| 2011 | Private Practice | Marshall Rakoff | Episode: "God Bless the Child" |
| 2011 | Criminal Minds | Ryan Hall | Episode: "The Bittersweet Science" |
| 2011 | The Office | Bert California | Episode: "Spooked" |
| 2012–2013 | Touch | Jake Bohm | Main role |
| 2013 | Major Crimes | Steve | Episode: "All In" |
| 2013 | Dear Dumb Diary | Hudson Rivers | Television film |
| 2014 | Drop Dead Diva | Ryan Hatcher | Episode: "Life & Death" |
| 2014–2019 | Gotham | Bruce Wayne / The Dark Knight | Lead role |
| 2017 | Family Guy | Peter Griffin's Co-Worker | Voice, episode: "Don't Be a Dickens on Christmas" |
| 2020 | Day by Day | Caleb / narrator | Episode: "Destiny Cinema 2" |

== Accolades ==
| Year | Award | Category | Nominated work | Result | Ref. |
|---|---|---|---|---|---|
| 2013 | 34th Young Artist Awards | Best Performance in a TV Series – Leading Young Actor | Touch | Nominated | |
| 2018 | 44th Saturn Awards | Best Performance by a Younger Actor in a Television Series | Gotham | Nominated | |
| 2018 | 2018 Teen Choice Awards | Teen Choice Award for Choice Action TV Actor | Gotham | Nominated | |
| 2019 | 45th Saturn Awards | Best Performance by a Younger Actor in a Television Series | Gotham | Nominated | |
