= Teen Voices =

Defunct program for teen girls in Boston

- Editor: Kathryn A. Wheeler
- Categories: Feminism; Youth
- Frequency: Biannual
- Founded: 1988
- Final issue: 2013 (print)
- Company: Women Express
- Country: United States
- Based in: Boston
- Language: English
- Website: teenvoices.com
- ISSN: 1074-7494

Teen Voices was an intensive journalism, mentoring, and leadership program for teen girls in Boston, and published the first magazine in the United States with alternative content created by and for teenage girls. Its mission was to support and educate teen girls to amplify their voices and create social change through media.

== History ==
Teen Voices was founded in 1988 as Women's Express, Inc., by Alison Amoroso and Christine Diamond, two young women who believed in the power of writing to heal and create positive social change. They conceived of a quarterly magazine as a platform for teen girls to explore their concerns, express their views, and develop confidence as feminist leaders. The founding members solicited writing from teen girls and educators across the country and provided curriculum and workshops to schools, YWCAs, girls’ detention facilities, and other community programs. The first issue was published in 1990 and included girls’ poetry and articles on date rape, violence prevention, and teen motherhood. A supplementary online magazine launched at www.teenvoices.com in 1999.

A sister chapter called Bay Area Teen Voices (BATV) operated in San Francisco, California, from 1996 until 2003. BATV published features in Teen Voices magazine, in addition to creating zines and hosting events for local teens to present their work and engage in conversation. A signature effort was a two-year collaboration with the Solutions Group, based in San Francisco's Juvenile Hall, which created a month-long “Girls in the Hall” exhibit at the Boys and Girls Club in the Mission District, using girls’ poetry, essays, photos, and audio recordings to raise public awareness about the plight of the predominantly Black and Latinx girls in the city's juvenile justice pipeline.

In 2003, the original Boston-based Teen Voices moved to a new downtown headquarters, where over the next decade, it expanded its international readership and programming for Boston-based girls. At its peak, Teen Voices had 45,000 print readers from more than 200 countries and received more than 6 million page views annually.

In 2012, Teen Voices ceased operations due to financial challenges. Women's eNews carried the Teen Voice legacy brand online, continuing to publish content by and about teen girls for several more years.

In 2021, a group of former staff launched the Teen Voices Legacy Project to collect and preserve stories from Teen Voices 24-year history. A complete collection of the magazines, along with organizational files and the oral histories of dozens of participants will be available at the Schlesinger Library at the Radcliffe Institute at Harvard University.

== Content ==
Teen Voices magazine, which published 63 issues from 1990 to 2021, focused on social justice issues and encouraged girls to become critical media consumers. It also encouraged teen girls around the world to speak out on issues, create positive and powerful media, and lead change in their communities. The magazine's tagline, “You’re more than a pretty face,” encapsulated its commitment to presenting the ideas and experiences of teen girls on their own terms. In contrast to advertisement-heavy mainstream publications that sexualized young women and promoted narrow standards of beauty, Teen Voices celebrated girls’ resilience and achievement, challenged mainstream cultural norms and media/advertising practices, and promoted girls’ activism on a range of social and economic justice issues.

Women's E-News reports that the teens who write for Teen Voices "gain journalism skills, while Teen Voices' readers receive a magazine that deals with serious societal issues--minus the celebrity profiles, fashion advice and dating tips common to most teen publications." According to the non-profit's website, Teen Voices "challenges the status quo and changes the status of girls and young women by presenting a view of girls that is more positive, more in depth, more diverse, and more supportive than mainstream images."

Teen Voices accepted submissions from teen girls around the world. Girls aged 13–19 could submit art, poetry, reviews, fiction and nonfiction content for possible publication. The Spring/Summer 2010 issue of ‘’Teen Voices’’ contains cover stories on sex trafficking, writing college essays, bullying, and instructions on staying safe and professional online. It includes interviews with photojournalist Scout Tufankjian, Twitter's Del Harvey, and actress Anna Deavere Smith. The Fall/Winter 2011 issue of ‘’Teen Voices’’ commemorated Teen Voices’ 20th year of print publishing. This issue contains articles on the dangers of sexting, teenage runaways, child marriage, and the art of henna design. Popular recurring features included Say What?!, which offered critiques of mainstream media through a feminist and social justice lens, Girl in Action, which presented stories of unsung teen leaders globally, and Dear D, an advice column in which Boston teens (in consultation with relevant professionals) replied to letters submitted by peers on topics ranging from sexual health to relationships to bullying.

== Annual event ==
Teen Voices hosted an annual event, Poetically Speaking, where teen girls performed their poetry. From 2009 until 2012, the event was held at Emerson College and was the only spoken word and poetry event for teen girls in the Greater Boston Area.

In 2011, the magazine celebrated “20 years of girls speaking truth to power.” Political powerhouse Donna Brazile gave the keynote speech and helped the organization celebrate its 20th year of print publication. Actress and playwright Anna Deavere Smith performed at the Amplify event held at Simmons College on April 14, 2010. Author and filmmaker Jean Kilbourne gave the keynote speech at the 2009 event.

Teen Voices was published by Teen Voices, Inc.

== See also ==
- Media and teen relationships
