= Ben McKenzie =

American actor, director, author, economic commentator (born 1978)

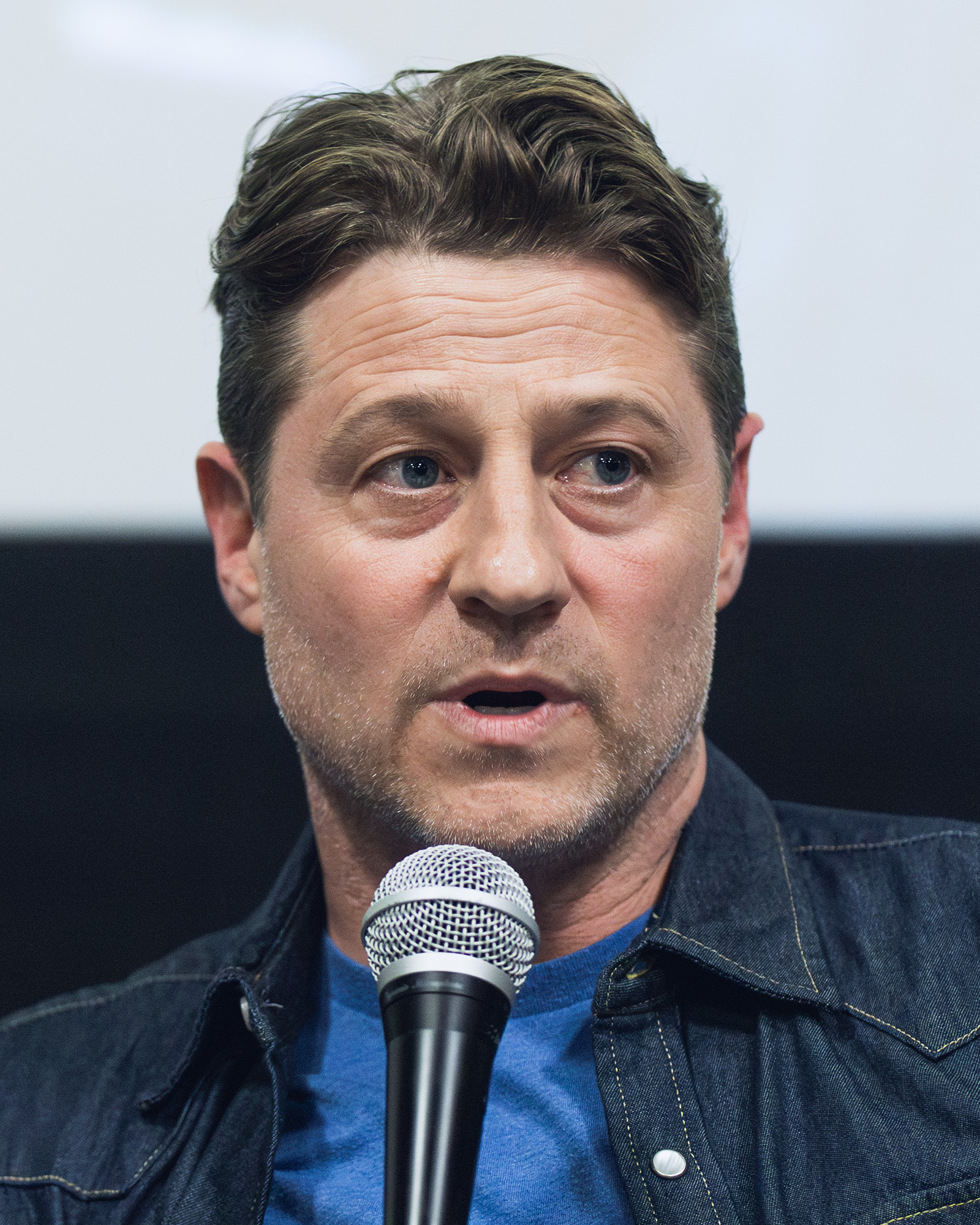
- McKenzie in 2026
- Born: Benjamin McKenzie Schenkkan; September 12, 1978 (age 48); Austin, Texas, U.S.
- Education: University of Virginia (BA)
- Occupations: Actor; commentator
- Years active: 2002–present
- Spouse: Morena Baccarin (m. 2017)
- Children: 2
- Relatives: Robert Schenkkan (uncle)

Benjamin McKenzie Schenkkan (born September 12, 1978) is an American actor, author, and commentator. He is best known for his starring television roles as Ryan Atwood on the teen drama The O.C. (2003–2007), Ben Sherman on the crime drama Southland (2009–2013), and James "Jim" Gordon on the crime drama Gotham (2014–2019).

McKenzie made his film debut in the Academy Award-nominated film Junebug (2005), before appearing in films including 88 Minutes (2007), Goodbye World (2013), Some Kind of Beautiful (2014), and Line of Duty (2019). In 2020, he made his Broadway debut in the Bess Wohl play Grand Horizons.

Outside of acting, McKenzie is noted for his critical commentary on the cryptocurrency bubble and fraud. His book on the subject, Easy Money: Cryptocurrency, Casino Capitalism, and the Golden Age of Fraud, was written with journalist Jacob Silverman and published in July 2023. He directed and produced the investigative documentary film Everyone Is Lying to You for Money, which was released in April 2026.

== Early life and education ==
McKenzie was born in Austin, Texas. He is one of three sons born to Frances Schenkkan, a poet, and Pete Schenkkan, an attorney. He has two younger brothers, both of whom are former actors. He is the brother-in-law of photojournalist Scout Tufankjian.

His grandfather, Robert F. Schenkkan, was a professor at the University of Texas at Austin and worked on passing the Public Broadcasting Act of 1967. He is a nephew of Pulitzer Prize-winning playwright Robert Schenkkan; McKenzie appeared in his 2019 work The Investigation. His middle name, McKenzie, is his paternal grandmother's maiden name; he uses it as part of his stage name to avoid confusion with actor Ben Shenkman. His second cousin is actress Sarah Drew.

For middle school, he attended St. Andrew's Episcopal School, where he was friends and flag football teammates with future Super Bowl MVP Drew Brees. He attended Stephen F. Austin High School, playing wide receiver and defensive back for the school's football team. From 1997 to 2001 he attended the University of Virginia, his father and paternal grandfather's alma mater, graduating in 2001 with an undergraduate degree in foreign affairs and economics.

== Acting career ==
=== 2001–2007: Early career and The O.C. ===
After graduating from college in 2001, McKenzie moved to New York City where he worked in part-time jobs and performed in some off-off-Broadway productions. During this period, he also participated in summer stock theater and the Williamstown Theatre Festival.

At age 23, he moved to Los Angeles where he waited tables and slept on the floor of his friend Ernie Sabella's apartment. He was soon cast as Ryan Atwood in The O.C. On August 5, 2003, Fox premiered the television series, about affluent teenagers with stormy personal lives in Orange County, California. The show became an overnight success and made McKenzie famous. His performance in The O.C. earned him "Choice Breakout TV Star – Male" and "Choice TV Chemistry" nominations in the Teen Choice Awards as well as "Choice TV Actor – Drama/Action Adventure" and "Choice TV Actor – Drama" wins. McKenzie reportedly earned between about $15,000 and $25,000 per episode throughout the show's run.

The O.C. was the first time McKenzie played what The New York Times later described as the "quiet, guarded leading man" role he would repeatedly portray. As a result of the show's success, McKenzie appeared in magazines including People, In Touch Weekly and Us Weekly. He was ranked No. 5 in Independent Online's "100 Sexiest Men Alive" and twice appeared on Teen People magazine's annual list of "25 Sexiest Stars under 25". McKenzie was also voted one of InStyle's "10 Hottest Bachelors of Summer" in July 2005. The O.C. dropped in ratings dramatically during its third and fourth seasons, and ended in early 2007.

While appearing in The O.C., McKenzie made his feature film debut in the Academy Award-nominated film Junebug alongside Amy Adams and Embeth Davidtz. The film was nominated for "Best International Film" and "Outstanding Ensemble Acting" in the Amanda Awards and won the Sarasota Film Festival award for "Outstanding Ensemble Acting". It also received high praise at the 2005 Sundance Film Festival. According to Production Weekly, McKenzie was set to star in the thriller Snakes on a Plane, formerly known as Pacific Air 121, but later dropped out to film 88 Minutes, which starred Al Pacino.

=== 2007–2019: Southland and Gotham ===
In 2008, McKenzie earned critical acclaim for his solo performance in the "live on stage, on film" version of Dalton Trumbo's 1939 novel Johnny Got His Gun, his first starring role in a film. He stars as Joe Bonham, a role previously played by James Cagney, Jeff Daniels, and Timothy Bottoms. The movie premiered at the Paramount Theater in Austin, McKenzie's hometown, while he was filming the pilot for Southland. In 2009, he appeared in the short film The Eight Percent. The movie won the Delta Air Lines Fly-in Movie Contest and entered as an official selection on the Tribeca Film Festival's Short film category.

McKenzie starred as rookie police officer Ben Sherman on the NBC drama Southland, which premiered on April 9, 2009. The show was canceled while in production on its second season. TNT bought the rights for the show and showed the seven episodes that had been produced. The show was subsequently renewed and ran for five seasons before being canceled in 2013. From September to October 2010, he starred in an off-Broadway transfer of The Glass Menagerie at the Mark Taper Forum in Los Angeles.

Following the end of Southland, McKenzie was cast in the CBS drama television pilot The Advocates, opposite Mandy Moore. The show was not produced. In late 2013, he was cast in the drama film The Swimmer, a Norwegian production that was not produced. In October 2013, he signed an exclusive talent deal with Warner Bros. Television Studios, the home of The O.C. and Southland. A few months later, in February 2014, it was announced that McKenzie was cast in the pilot of Gotham.

McKenzie returned to Fox in the Batman prequel television show Gotham, which premiered on September 22, 2014. In the series, he portrayed James "Jim" Gordon as a young detective new to Gotham City. After five seasons and 100 episodes, the show concluded in April 2019. In the same series, he made his directorial debut with the season 3 episode "These Delicate and Dark Obsessions". McKenzie went on to direct "One of My Three Soups" and write "The Demon's Head" from the fourth season.

In 2017, he appeared in the first season of The Accidental Wolf, a miniseries series created by Arian Moayed and the theater production company Waterwell. He shot Line of Duty, a real-time action thriller, in Birmingham, Alabama in early summer 2018; it was released in 2019.

=== 2019–present: New projects, theater, and filmmaking ===
Following the conclusion of Gotham in 2019, McKenzie indicated the end of one chapter in his career, turning to new efforts including writing and directing.

On June 24, 2019, McKenzie, along with an ensemble cast, presented The Investigation: A Search for the Truth in Ten Acts, a dramatic reading of Special Counsel Robert S. Mueller III's Report on the Investigation into Russian Interference in the 2016 Presidential Election. McKenzie portrayed President Donald Trump's former National Security Advisor Michael Flynn, as well as Donald Trump Jr.

McKenzie made his Broadway debut on January 23, 2020, in the Second Stage production of Grand Horizons at the Hayes Theater. McKenzie starred as Ben, one of two sons struggling with their elderly parents' divorce. A limited-run production, the play began previews on December 23, 2019 and closed on March 1, 2020. The production was nominated for Best Play at the 2020 Tony Awards, among other honors.

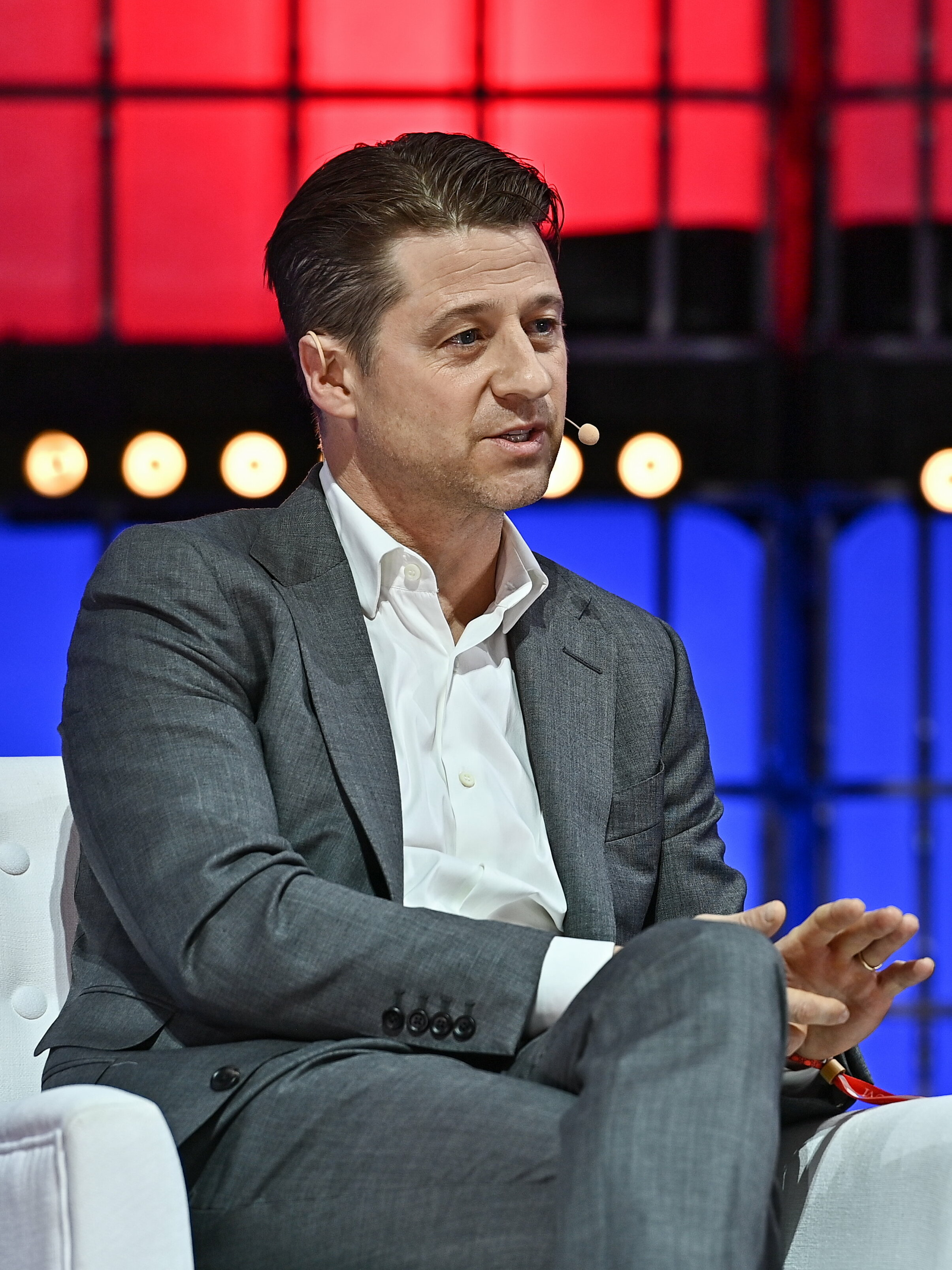
McKenzie in 2022

In February 2022, it was announced that McKenzie would star in and produce Bloat, an internationally produced J-horror film. In February 2023, he was announced as a star in the ABC medical drama pilot The Hurt Unit which was not picked up to series. His next acting project was a supporting role in the action thriller Motor City. The film premiered at the Venice Film Festival as part of the Venice Spotlight sidebar and then the Toronto International Film Festival in 2025.

McKenzie began developing an original documentary on predatory cryptocurrency schemes in 2021, with production efforts following the publication of his 2023 book on the subject, Easy Money. This resulted in the investigative film Everyone Is Lying to You for Money, which premiered at SXSW London in June 2025. McKenzie wrote, directed, and plays a central role within the film, which he directed with filmmaker Giorgio Angelini.

In October 2026, McKenzie guest starred as Sheriff Wade in CBS series Sheriff Country, opposite his real-life wife and lead star Baccarin, in the show's season premiere.

As of 2026, McKenzie is purportedly developing a legal thriller series with veteran television producer David E. Kelley, inspired by the political underbelly exposed during the corruption scandals and investigations under then-mayor Eric Adams. In July 2026, McKenzie was announced for and began filming Kelley's new project, the thriller series Myron Bolitar, adapted from the book series of the same name by Harlan Coben. McKenzie has a recurring role of Gavin Pierce, a high profile sports agent.

== Criticism of cryptocurrency ==
Ben McKenzie
(@ben_mckenzie)
tweeted:

I'm just a former teen idol standing here (alone?) asking people to consider downside risk and the possibility of fraud. I hope I'm wrong, but pretty sure we'll find out soon enough. Good luck folks – don't take financial advice from celebs, including me.

February 4, 2022

=== Commentary ===
Since 2021, McKenzie has been an outspoken critic of cryptocurrency, especially during its 2020–2022 bubble and subsequent crash. At that time, he was noted as one of the few celebrity skeptics of the currency. As such, he has been particularly critical of the proliferation of celebrity endorsements of unstable cryptocurrencies, their speculation, and NFTs. McKenzie testified at the United States Senate Committee on Banking, Housing, and Urban Affairs hearing "Crypto Crash: Why the FTX Bubble Burst and the Harm to Consumers" in December 2022. On July 14, 2026, he joined Democratic Senators in a press conference on Capitol Hill to argue for inclusion of ethics provisions in a proposed cryptocurrency regulation bill named the Clarity Act, to prevent public officials, and specifically President Trump, from cashing in on crypto exchanges while simultaneously forming public policy.

With journalist Jacob Silverman, he has written a number of critical articles on crypto for publications including Slate, The New Republic, The Washington Post, and The Intercept. They had a featured session on the topic at the 2022 SXSW Festival and McKenzie at WSJ Tech Live 2022 and the 2022 Web Summit. As a pundit, McKenzie has also appeared on CNN Business, CNBC, CBS News, and Real Time with Bill Maher to discuss the topic. He has been a guest on podcasts like What Next: TBD, Deconstructed, Chapo Trap House, and The Weekly Show with Jon Stewart and radio programs Marketplace Tech and Morning Edition.

McKenzie attributes his initial interest in the subject to his undergraduate degree in economics and friends' interest in cryptocurrency, as well as coursework on the blockchain from MIT professor and SEC chairman Gary Gensler and Capital in the Twenty-First Century by economist Thomas Piketty.

=== Book and film ===
McKenzie's debut book Easy Money: Cryptocurrency, Casino Capitalism, and the Golden Age of Fraud with journalist Jacob Silverman was released by Abrams Press on July 18, 2023. The book includes a claim from McKenzie that the CIA "begged" him to explain cryptocurrency to them. The book is a New York Times Bestseller and was longlisted for the Financial Times' Business Book of the Year in 2023.

While researching the book, McKenzie began working on what would become his film directorial debut. His cryptocurrency documentary, Everyone Is Lying to You for Money, premiered at SXSW in London in June 2025. The film was released in theaters in April 2026.

== Personal life ==
McKenzie is married to actress Morena Baccarin. Together they have two children, a daughter and a son, in addition to a stepson from Baccarin's first marriage. Together, the family lives in Brooklyn Heights, Brooklyn. In the 2010s, they lived in Battery Park City in Manhattan.

McKenzie and Baccarin met as co-stars in Gotham, and their relationship and intent to marry was first revealed as part of a September 2015 legal declaration involving her divorce from Austin Chick. Following the birth of their first child and the finalization of Baccarin's divorce in March 2016, the two married on June 2, 2017, in Brooklyn, New York.

McKenzie is a supporter of the Democratic Party and has been aligned with Democratic politics throughout his career. At the height of The OC, he delivered remarks at the 2004 Democratic National Convention, and he supported the 2020 Turn Texas Blue campaign, as well as various other statements, advocacy efforts, and fundraising initiatives.

== Filmography ==
=== Film ===
Year	Title	Role	Notes	Ref.
2005	Junebug	Johnny Johnsten		
2007	88 Minutes	Mike Stempt	Credited as Benjamin McKenzie	
2008	Every Monday Matters	Himself	Documentary	
2008	Johnny Got His Gun	Joe Bonham	Filmed stage performance	
2009	The Eight Percent	John Keller	Short film	
2011	Batman: Year One	Bruce Wayne / Batman (voice)		
2011	The Blisters: How Three Became Four	Dave	Short film; also a producer	
2012	Adventures in the Sin Bin	Michael		
2012	Decoding Annie Parker	Tom		
2013	Goodbye World	Nick Randworth		
2014	Some Kind of Beautiful	Brian		
2019	The Report	Scrubbed CIA Officer		
2019	Line of Duty	Dean Keller		
2022	I Want You Back	Leighton's Dad		
2025	Bloat	Jack		
2025	Everyone Is Lying to You for Money	Himself	Documentary; also director, writer, and producer	
2025	Motor City	Kent		

=== Television ===
Year	Title	Role	Notes	Ref.
2002	The District	Tim Ruskin	Episode: "Faith" (credited as Benjamin McKenzie)	
2003	JAG	Petty Officer Spencer	Episode: "Empty Quiver" (credited as Benjamin McKenzie)	
2003–2007	The O.C.	Ryan Atwood	92 episodes	
2004	MADtv	Ryan Atwood	1 episode	
2004–2005	Punk'd	Himself	2 episodes	
2009–2013	Southland	Ben Sherman	43 episodes	
2011	Scooby-Doo! Mystery Incorporated	Odnarb (voice)	Episode: "The Wild Brood"	
2013	Men at Work	Bryan	Episode: "Tyler the Pioneer"	
2013	The Advocates	Henry Bird	CBS pilot	
2014–2019	Gotham	James "Jim" Gordon	100 episodes; director (3 episodes), writer (2 episodes)	
2017	The Accidental Wolf		Webseries	
2023	The Hurt Unit	Danny	ABC pilot	
2026	Real Time with Bill Maher	Himself	Invited to discuss cryptocurrency and his 2025 documentary Everyone is Lying to You for Money.	
2026	Sheriff Country	Sheriff Wade	Guest role, season 2 premiere	
TBA	Myron Bolitar	Gavin Pierce	Recurring role, upcoming series	

=== Audio ===
Year	Title	Role	Notes	Ref.
2020	Phreaks	Narrator	Audio book	
2023	Easy Money: Cryptocurrency, Casino Capitalism, and the Golden Age of Fraud	Narrator/co-author	Audio book	
2024	In the Blood	Host	Podcast	

=== Theater ===
Year	Title	Role	Venue	Notes	Ref.
2001	The Blue Bird	Various	Williamstown Theatre Festival	Credited as Benjamin Schenkkan	
2001	Street Scene	Neighbor	Williamstown Theatre Festival	Credited as Benjamin Schenkkan	
2010	The Glass Menagerie	Jim O'Connor	Mark Taper Forum		
2011	Marriage	Performer	Atlantic Theater	10x25 Festival	
2019	The Investigation: A Search for the Truth in Ten Acts	Michael Flynn / Donald Trump Jr.	Riverside Church	Reading	
2020	Grand Horizons	Ben	Hayes Theater	Broadway	

== Bibliography ==
- McKenzie, Benjamin; Silverman, Jacob (2023). Easy Money Cryptocurrency, Casino Capitalism, and the Golden Age of Fraud. Abrams Press. ISBN 978-1-4197-6639-8. OCLC 1338834619. Archived from the original on November 12, 2022.

== Awards and nominations ==
Year	Award	Category	Nominated work	Result	Ref.
2004	Teen Choice Awards	Choice Breakout TV Star – Male	The O.C.	Nominated	
2004	Teen Choice Awards	Choice TV Actor – Drama/Action Adventure	The O.C.	Nominated	
2005	Teen Choice Awards	Choice TV Actor Drama	The O.C.	Nominated	
2005	Teen Choice Awards	Choice TV Chemistry (shared with Mischa Barton)	The O.C.	Nominated	
2012	PRISM Award	Male Performance in a Drama Series Multi-Episode Storyline	Southland	Nominated	
2015	People's Choice Awards	Favorite Actor In A New TV Series	Gotham	Nominated	
2016	Teen Choice Award	Choice TV Actor Drama	Gotham	Nominated	
2019	Teen Choice Award	Choice Action TV Actor	Gotham	Nominated	

Preceded by Gary Oldman	James Gordon Actor; 2014–2019; With: J. K. Simmons in DCEU	Succeeded by Jeffrey Wright
