= Bloat =

Bloat may refer to:

== Biology and medicine ==
- Bloat (canine) (gastric dilatation volvulus), an overstretched and rotated stomach in dogs
- Bloat (ruminant) (ruminal tympany), an excessive volume of gas in ruminants
- Bloating, an abnormal swelling or enlargement of the abdomen
- Gas bloat syndrome, a complication of Nissen fundoplication surgery

== Computing ==
- Code bloat, computer code that is unnecessarily long, slow, or wasteful of resources
- Software bloat, uncontrolled and damaging growth of a software system through successive versions

== Other uses ==
- Bloat, a pufferfish and the character in the Finding Nemo franchise
- Bloat (film), a Japanese-American screenlife horror film
