= Social issue =

Problem that influences a considerable number of individuals within a society

A social issue is a problem that affects many people within a society. It is a group of common problems in present-day society that many people strive to solve. It is often the consequence of factors extending beyond an individual's control. Social issues are the source of conflicting opinions on the grounds of what is perceived as morally correct or incorrect personal life or interpersonal social life decisions. Social issues are distinguished from economic issues; however, some issues (such as immigration) have both social and economic aspects. Some issues do not fall into either category, such as warfare.

Exemplary for social issues was the so-called social question in the beginning of the industrial revolution. Growing poverty on one hand and growing population and materialistic wealth on the other hand caused tension between the very rich and the poorest people inside society.

There can be disagreements about what social issues are worth solving, or which should take precedence. Different individuals and different societies have different perceptions. In Rights of Man and Common Sense, Thomas Paine addresses the individual's duty to "allow the same rights to others as we allow ourselves." The failure to do so causes the creation of a social issue.

There are a variety of methods people use to combat social issues. Some people vote for leaders in a democracy to advance their ideals. Outside the political process, people donate or share their time, money, energy, or other resources. This often takes the form of volunteering. Nonprofit organizations are often formed for the sole purpose of solving a social issue. Community organizing involves gathering people together for a common purpose.

A distinct but related meaning of the term "social issue" (used particularly in the United States) refers to topics of national political interest, over which the public is deeply divided and which are the subject of intense partisan advocacy, debate, and voting. In this case "social issue" does not necessarily refer to an ill to be solved, but rather a topic to be discussed.

== Personal issues ==
Personal issues are those that individuals deal with themselves and within a small range of their peers and relationships. Personal issues can be any life-altering event. On the other hand, social issues involve values cherished by widespread society. For example, a high unemployment rate that affects millions of people is a social issue.

== Valence issues versus position issues ==
A valence issue is a social problem that people uniformly interpret the same way. An example of a valence issue is child abuse, which is condemned across several societies. A position issue is a social problem in which the popular opinion among society is divided. Different people may hold different and strongly-held views, which are not easily changed. An example of a position issue is abortion which, in some countries, has not generated a widespread consensus from the public.

== Types ==
Generic types of social issues, along with examples of each, are as follows:

=== Economic issues ===
Unemployment rates vary by region, gender, educational attainment, and ethnic group.

In most countries (including developed countries), many people are poor and depend on welfare. In 2007 in Germany, one in six children are poor. That is up from only one in seventy-five in 1965. War also plays an important role in disturbing the economic status of a country by using money that was intended for welfare.

=== Public health ===
Widespread health conditions (often characterized as epidemics or pandemics) are of concern to society as a whole. They can harm the quality of life, and the ability of people to contribute to society (e.g. by working), and can result in death.

Infectious diseases are often public health concerns because they can spread quickly and easily, affecting large numbers of people. The World Health Organization has an acute interest in combating infectious disease outbreaks by minimizing their geographic and numerical spread and treating the affected. Other conditions for which there is not yet a cure or even effective treatment, such as dementia, can be viewed as public health concerns in the long run.

=== Age discrimination ===
Throughout the life course, there are social problems associated with different ages. One such social problem is age discrimination. People often do not allow old people into high ranking position within their respective jobs because of their age, despite them having crucial experience and ample knowledge collected over many years of labour in the same field or another field with the same requirements as the current one.

=== Social inequality ===
Social inequality is "the state or quality of being unequal". Inequality is the root of several social problems that occur when factors such as gender, disability, race, and age may affect the way a person is treated. A past example of inequality as a social problem is slavery in the United States. Africans brought to America were often enslaved and mistreated, and they did not share the same rights as the white population of America (for example, they were not allowed to vote).

Some civil rights movements have attempted to and often succeeded at, advancing equality and extending rights to marginalized groups. These include the women's rights movement (beginning around the 1920s), the civil rights movement in the United States for African-American equality (beginning around the 1950s).

=== Education and public schools ===
Education is unarguably the most important factor in a person's success in society. As a result, social problems can be raised by the unequal distribution of funding between public schools, such as that seen in the United States. The weak organizational policy in the place and the lack of communication between public schools and the federal government have led to major effects on the future generation. Public schools that do not receive high standardized test scores are not being sufficiently funded and as a result, their students are not receiving what should be the maximum level of education.

=== Work and occupations ===
Social problems in the workplace include occupational stress, theft, sexual harassment, wage inequality, gender inequality, racial inequality, health care disparities, and many more. In addition, common workplace issues that employees face include interpersonal conflict, communication problems (e.g. gossip), bullying, harassment, discrimination, low motivation and job satisfaction, and performance issues.

=== Environmental racism ===
Environmental racism exists when a particular place or town is subject to problematic environmental practices due to the racial and class components of that space. In general, the place or town is inhabited by lower-income and minority groups. Often, there is more pollution, factories, dumping, etc. that produce environmental hazards and health risks which are not seen in more affluent cities, such as those in Bangladesh.

=== Abortion debate ===
The abortion debate is the ongoing controversy surrounding the moral, legal, and religious status of induced abortion. In English-speaking countries, the sides involved in the debate are the self-described "pro-choice" and "pro-life" movements. Pro-choice emphasizes the woman's choice of whether to terminate a pregnancy. Pro-life proposes the right of the embryo or fetus to gestate to term and be born. Both terms are considered loaded in mainstream media, where terms such as "abortion rights" or "anti-abortion" are generally preferred. Each movement has, with varying results, sought to influence public opinion and to attain legal support for its position.

=== Other issues ===
Other issues may include cost of living, friendship recession, education, lack of literacy and numeracy, loneliness, unaffordable housing, corruption, school truancy, violence and bullying in schools, religious intolerance, immigration, political and religious extremism, discrimination of all sorts, the role of women, pensions crisis, gender issues, sexual orientation, unplanned parenthood, teenage pregnancy, child labour, war, inflation, wage inequality and many more.

== By country ==
=== Canada ===
==== Poverty ====
The face of Canadian poverty is described as racialized, destitute, and young. It is common among whites, aboriginal, and black people communities, and racial minorities. Additionally, racial minorities face both unemployment and underemployment compared to their counterparts. On reserves, poverty due to multiple factors has an exponential function. For instance, the sense of cultural isolation normally results from a deterioration of economic, social, and health conditions compared to those living off reserves. Poverty in Canada has a self-perpetuating system, where the societal mechanisms ensure that the poorest Canadians remain poor. Urban poverty is showcased through a lack of low-income housing for individuals and families and increasing homelessness.

==== Racism and prejudice ====
The current prevalent forms of racism in Canada are structural racism (e.g. the Henry and Elfie Ginzberg experiment), individualized racism (e.g. racial profiling by police that is broadly defined by the Ontario Human Rights Commission), and internalized racism (e.g. first-generation immigrants and refugees). Social distance between whites and non-whites is a distinct aspect of the Canadian community that is identified through the isolation index. The anti-racism movement in Canada has borne aversive racism.

==== Aging and discrimination ====
It is estimated that by 2030, seniors will make about 23% of the Canadian population. This shrinks the labour force and real GDP growth rate, which may result in higher taxes. Additionally, Canada's fertility rate has been falling since 2009, especially in white families. Immigrants with dependents is also not a conducive element for reducing the impact; however, they can increase the population rate of rural areas to increase financial activities. It is studied that Canadians openly practice ageism. This discrimination based on age results in refusing jobs to qualified and willing candidates, while such negative attitudes are further legitimized by mass media. Filial responsibility is also an alien concept in the North American culture due to the prominence of individualism, except within indigenous communities. Those that attempt to uphold do not know how to perform (due to lack of precedence) and to a larger extent it might result in elder abuse. Public Health Agency of Canada reported that about 4 – 10% of seniors were facing elder abuse in Canada.

This is both a cultural and historical phenomenon that contests against the basis of social beings able to satisfy needs of other people through companionship and social integration. It could be further seen in the failure of Canadian social institutions to meet the needs of the dependent aged within a systematic approach (e.g. trend of eldercare increasingly considered as a private matter rather than a public one and political leniency to "non-system" for elder care, as in the United States) and representation (e.g. non-representation of the stigmatized's oppressed voice to shape social institutions in ways that meet their needs). However, organizations like "Canada's Association for the Fifty-Plus" actively lobbies for reforming social policies.

=== United States ===
Several social issues have been prominent in the history of the United States. Many of them have waxed or waned over time as conditions and values have changed. The term "social issue" has a broad meaning in the United States, as it refers not only to ills to be solved but also to any topic of widespread debate, involving deeply-held values and beliefs.

The Library of Congress has an established index of social causes in the United States. Examples include academic cheating, church-state separation, hacking, evolution education, gangs, hate speech, suicide, urban sprawl, and unions.

Social issues gain a particularly high-profile when a new president is elected. Elections are often impacted by several social issues, with many social issues discussed during debates, such as rights for abortion, LGBT people, and gun control.

==== Crime and the justice system ====
In the United States, the federal prison system has been unable to keep up with the steady increase of inmates over the past few years, causing major overcrowding. In the year 2012, the overcrowding level was 41 percent above "rated capacity" and was the highest level since 2004.

In addition to being overcrowded, the federal prison system in the U.S. has also been at the center of controversy concerning the conditions in which prisoners are forced to live.

==== Hate crimes ====
Hate crimes are a social problem in the United States because they directly marginalize and target specific groups of people or specific communities based on their identities. Hate crimes can be committed as the result of hate-motivated behaviour, prejudice, and intolerance due to sexual orientation, gender expression, biological sex, ethnicity, race, religion, disability, or any other identity. Hate crimes are a growing issue especially in school settings because of the young populations that exist. The majority of victims and perpetrators are teenagers and young adults (the population that exists within educational institutions). Hate crimes can result in physical or sexual assault or harassment, verbal harassment, robbery, and death.

==== Obesity ====
Obesity is a prevalent social problem in today's society, with rates steadily increasing. According to the Weight-Control Information Network, since the early 1960s, the prevalence of obesity among adults more than doubled, increasing from 13.4 to 35.7 percent in U.S. adults aged 20 and older. Today, two in three adults are considered overweight or obese, and one in six children aged 6–19 are considered obese. This disease gives birth to many other diseases and conditions like cardiovascular diseases, diabetes, depression, obstructive sleep and different types of cancer and osteoarthritis.

===== Advertising junk food to children =====
The food industry has been criticized for promoting childhood obesity and ill-health by specifically targeting the child demographic in the marketing of unhealthy food products. The food products marketed often are deemed unhealthy due to their high calorie, fat, and sugar contents. Reduction of marketing of unhealthy food products could significantly reduce the prevalence of obesity and its serious health consequences. Former first lady Michelle Obama and Partnership for a Healthier America have proposed new rules that would limit junk food marketing in public schools.

==== Hunger ====
Hunger is a social issue. In 2018, about 11.1% of American households were food insecure.

==== Media propaganda ====
Mass media may use propaganda as a means to promote or publicize a particular political cause or point of view, or to maintain the viewer's attention. Who owns a media outlet often determines things such as the types of social problems that are presented, how long the problems are aired, and how dramatically the problems are presented. The American media is often biased towards one or the other end of the political spectrum, with many media outlets having been accused of either being too conservative or too liberal.

==== Alcohol and other drugs ====
Drugs are at times the cause of social problems. Drugs such as cocaine and opiates are addictive for some users. A minority of users of such drugs may commit crimes to obtain more drugs. In some individuals, drugs such as methamphetamine have been known to contribute to violent behaviour, which would be considered a social problem.

Drunk driving is on the rise and is the number two cause of accidental deaths, causing approximately 17,000 deaths each year. All but nine states in the United States have adopted the Administrative License Revocation (ALR). The ALR is enforced when a person is caught drinking and driving and found guilty, resulting in the loss of their license for a full year. This is a step that is being taken to try to avoid the occurrence of this social problem.

Legal marijuana is a debatable topic. Marijuana can be used in the medical domain, and there is no accurate fact that shows marijuana kills. However, people believe marijuana is a gateway to other drugs, injures lungs, and inhibits function. Some states are legalizing medical marijuana, such as New Mexico, Arizona, and New York. Some states are also legalizing it for both medical and recreational purposes, such as Colorado, California, and Oregon.

==== Racism and racial inequality ====
Racism against various ethnic or minority groups has existed in the United States since the colonial era. African Americans in particular have faced restrictions on their political, social, and economic freedoms throughout much of United States history.

=== Additional social issues ===
- Healthcare in the United States
- Human rights in the United States
- Violence against LGBT people in the United States
- Domestic violence in the United States
- Gender inequality in the United States
- Gun violence in the United States
- Wealth inequality in the United States
- Income inequality in the United States
- Social media and teens

=== India ===
==== Corruption ====
India is ranked 75 out of 179 countries in Transparency International's Corruption Perceptions Index, but its score has improved consistently from 2.7 in 2002 to 3.1 in 2011.

In India, corruption takes the form of bribes, tax evasion, exchange controls, embezzlement, etc. A 2005 study done by Transparency International (TI) India found that more than 50% had firsthand experience of paying bribe or peddling influence to complete a task in a public office. The chief economic consequences of corruption are the loss to the exchequer and an increase in the cost of government-subsidised services, the unhealthy climate for investment, political instability, and unprincipled ethics.

The TI India study estimates the monetary value of petty corruption in eleven basic services provided by the government, such as education, healthcare, judiciary, police, etc., to be approximately Rs.21,068 crores. India still ranks in the bottom quartile of developing nations in terms of the ease of doing business and compared to China and other lower developed Asian nations, the average time taken to secure the clearances for a startup or to invoke bankruptcy is much greater. Recently, a revelation of tax evasion (Panama Papers' Leak) case involving several high-profile celebrities and businessmen has increased the number of corruption charges against the elite of the country.

==== Social structure ====
India is a multicultural country with different social identities formed from varying cultural norms, religious politics, linguistic differences, tolerance to changes in economic orientation, barriers to qualitative education, and mismanagement of resources.

==== Poverty ====
The World Bank in 2011, based on 2005's PPPs International Comparison Program, estimated 23.6% of the Indian population, or about 276 million people, lived below $1.25 per day on purchasing power parity. According to the United Nations' Millennium Development Goal (MDG) programme, 270 million out of 1.2 billion Indians, or 21.9% of the population, lived below the poverty line of $1.25 between 2011 and 2012 (as compared to 41.6% between 2004 and 2005).

==== Terrorism ====
The regions with long term terrorist activities today are Jammu and Kashmir (state-sponsored terrorism), Central India (Naxalism), and Seven Sister States (independence and autonomy movements). In the past, the Punjab insurgency led to militant activities in the Indian state of Punjab as well as the national capital of Delhi (e.g. Delhi serial blasts and anti-Sikh riots). As of 2006, at least 232 of the country's 606 districts were afflicted, at varying intensities, by several insurgent and terrorist movements.

==== Additional social issues ====
- Caste-related violence in India
- Caste system in India
- Mandal Commission
- Reservation in India
- Unemployment in India
- Illegal immigration to India
- Refugees in India
- Fake news in India
- Malnutrition in India
- Poverty in India
- Religious violence in India
- Healthcare in India
- Domestic violence in India
- Gender inequality in India
- Income inequality in India
- Naxalite–Maoist insurgency

=== Germany ===
==== Poverty ====
Unemployment rates vary by region, gender, educational attainment, and ethnic group.

A growing number of Germans are poor and dependent on welfare. In 2007, one in six children depended on welfare. That is up from only one in seventy-five in 1965. Poverty rates vary in different states. For instance, only 3.9% suffer from poverty in Bavaria, while 15.2% of Berlin's inhabitants are poor. Families that are headed by a single parent and working-class families with multiple children are most likely to be poor.

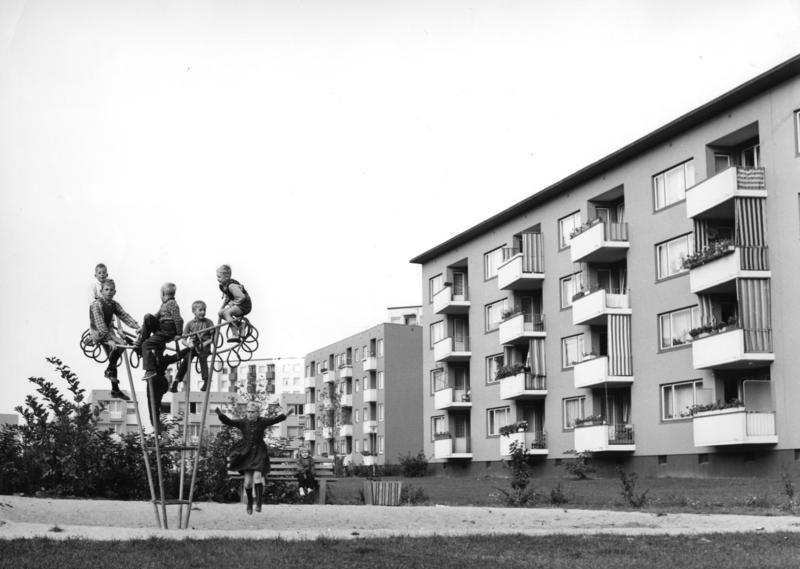
Housing project in Bremen-Vahr in the 1960s, back then most tenants living in housing-projects were two-parent families with at least one parent working. In many housing projects, the composition of tenants has changed since then and now many tenant-families are headed by a single female or an unemployed male.

There is an ongoing discussion about hunger in Germany. Reverend Bernd Siggelkow, founder of the Berlin-based soup kitchen "Die Arche," claimed that many German children go hungry each day. He blamed the lack of jobs, low welfare payments, and parents who were drug-addicted or mentally ill. Siggelkow has been criticized by some people who said there was no hunger in Germany. SPD politician and board member of the German central bank, Thilo Sarrazin, said it was possible to live on welfare without going hungry if one did not buy fast food and cooked from scratch instead. He was criticized by The Left politician, Heidi Knake-Werner, who said it was not right "if well-paid people like us make recommendations to poor people about how they should shop."

==== Birth rate ====
Germany has one of the lowest birth rates in the world. In 2012, its national fertility rate was 1.41 children per woman. This is up slightly from the 2002 rate of 1.31, but it is still well below the replacement rate of 2.1 children per woman. (By contrast, the United States had a fertility rate of 2.06 in 2012). Despite the nation's low birth rate, Germans are living longer, with 2012 estimates showcasing a life expectancy of 80.19 years (77.93 years for men and 82.58 years for women). This demographic shift is already straining the country's social welfare structures and will produce further economic and social problems in the future. The Mikrozensus in 2008 revealed that the number of children a German woman aged 40 to 75 had was closely linked to her educational achievement.

==== Deprived neighbourhoods ====
So-called problem neighbourhoods ("Problemviertel") exist in Germany. These neighbourhoods have a high drop-out rate from secondary school. Children growing up in these neighbourhoods have only 1/7th the probability of going to college compared to a person growing up in another neighbourhood. Abuse of alcohol and drugs is common. Many people living in problem neighbourhoods are what is called a-people. They are poor out-of-work, and immigrants.

Often these neighbourhoods were founded out of good intentions. Many districts that later became problem neighbourhoods were founded in the 1960s and 1970s when the state wanted to provide better housing for poorer persons. As a result, big tenement buildings were built. The first tenants were mostly two-parent families, with at least one parent working. Many were happy with their neighbourhoods, but when the unemployment rate started increasing, more and more people lost their jobs. Moreover, families who could afford it started moving into better districts and only those who could not afford to move stayed in districts such as Hamburg-Mümmelmannsberg.

==== Political extremism, racism and antisemitism ====
Since World War II, Germany has experienced intermittent turmoil from various groups. In the 1970s, radical leftist terrorist organizations, such as the Red Army Faction, engaged in a string of assassinations and kidnappings against political and business figures. Germany has also continued to struggle with far-right violence. Neo-Nazis are presently on the rise (this is in line with the younger generation of Germans growing older). There is some debate as to whether hate crime is actually rising, or whether simply more arrests have been made due to increased law-enforcement efforts. The number of officially recognized violent hate crimes has risen from 759 in 2003 to 776 in 2005. According to a recent study, a majority of Jews living in Germany were worried about a rise in antisemitism. The concern of Jews in Germany was less than those in France, where 90% of Jews that were polled said that antisemitism had risen over the years. Some have suggested that the increase in hate crime is related to the proliferation of right-wing parties, such as the National Democratic Party (NPD) in local elections.

=== Iran ===
57 percent of the population has malnutrition, while the Ministry of Interior has put population aging as priority first. As of 2023 the country experiences mass economic inequality and extremely heavy inflation. There is also political unrest. The price of education and health has steadily increased. Iranian skilled workers and laborers are moving out of the country.

=== France ===
==== Precarity and poverty ====
There is the fragility of income and social position in France, with several ways to measure this. One example is to look at unemployment. Within the European Union in May 2017, France was ranked 6th with its unemployment rate of 9.4 percent, as found by Statista. According to Observatoire des inégalités, France has between 5 and 8.9 million poor people, depending on the definition of poverty (this definition ranges from the poverty line at 50 percent of the median standard of living to 60 percent).

==== Gender inequality ====
Women suffer from economical and social problems in France. They are paid, on average, 6.8 percent less than men, according to l'insee. Women in France also face sexual harassment and other problems. These are some reasons why the Global Gender Gap report of 2016 has ranked France 17th with a score of 0.755 (on this ranking scale, reaching 1 means gender equality).

== See also ==
- Moral entrepreneur – Someone interested in changing social norms
- Moral panic – Fear that some evil threatens society
- Social constructionism – Sociological theory regarding shared understandings
- Social Problems – Sociology journal
- Social policy
- The Society for the Study of Social Problems – American sociological organization
- Wicked problem – Problem that is difficult or impossible to solve
