= Morena Baccarin =

Brazilian-American actress (born 1979)

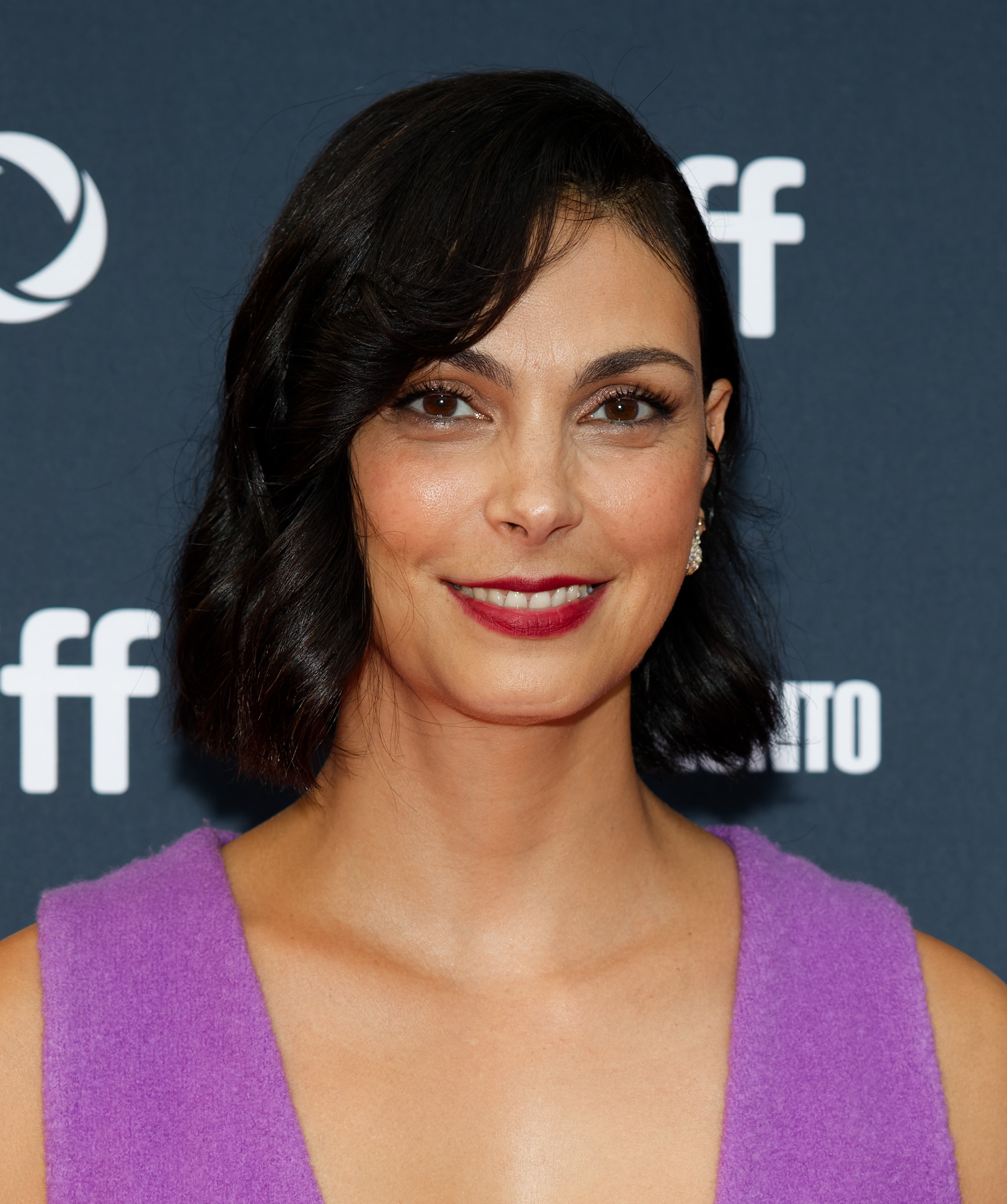
- Baccarin in 2024
- Born: Morena Silva de Vaz Setta Baccarin; June 2, 1979 (age 47); Rio de Janeiro, Brazil
- Citizenship: U.S.; Brazil
- Education: Juilliard School (BFA)
- Occupation: Actress
- Years active: 2001–present
- Spouses: Austin Chick (m. 2011; div. 2016); Ben McKenzie (m. 2017)
- Children: 3
- Mother: Vera Setta

Morena Silva de Vaz Setta Baccarin (Brazilian Portuguese: [moˈɾenɐ bakaˈɾĩ]; born June 2, 1979) is a Brazilian-American actress. Known for her lead role as Mickey Fox in the CBS television series Sheriff Country since 2025, Baccarin has played multiple television and film roles. She portrayed Adria in season 10 of the TV series Stargate SG-1, Inara Serra in the sci-fi television series Firefly (2002–2003) and its follow-up film Serenity (2005), Vanessa in the superhero comedy films Deadpool (2016), Deadpool 2 (2018), and Deadpool & Wolverine (2024), Jessica Brody in the thriller series Homeland (2011–2013), and Leslie Thompkins in the superhero series Gotham (2015–2019). For Homeland, Baccarin was nominated for the Primetime Emmy Award for Outstanding Supporting Actress in a Drama Series in 2013. Born in Brazil, she immigrated to the United States as a child.

== Early life and education ==
Baccarin was born in Rio de Janeiro, Brazil, the daughter of Vera Setta, an actress, and Fernando Baccarin, a journalist. Through her father, she is partially of Italian descent, with roots in Veneto. She moved to New York City with her family at the age of ten. Baccarin attended Public School 41 and New York City Lab School for Collaborative Studies, where she and her future Homeland co-star Claire Danes were classmates. Baccarin later entered the theater program at the Juilliard School, where she was in the drama division's Group 29 (1996–2000). She is a naturalized U.S. citizen.

== Career ==
Baccarin landed her first film role in the improvised fashion-world comedy Perfume (2001). This was followed by a lead role in Way Off Broadway (2001).

She served as Natalie Portman's understudy in the Central Park production of The Seagull. The science-fiction drama Firefly (2002) as Inara Serra was Baccarin's first television series, and she reprised her role in the 2005 film Serenity.

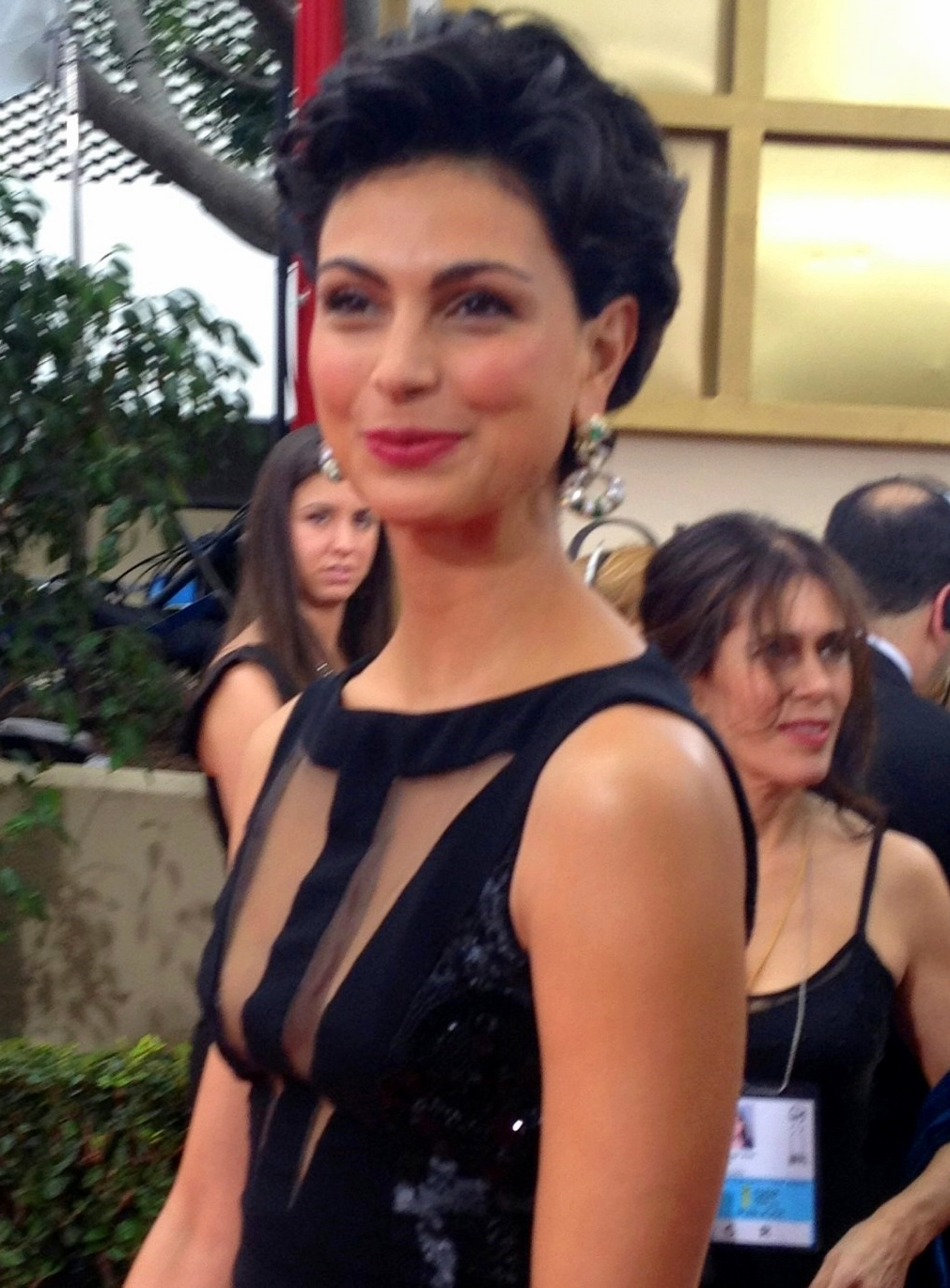
Baccarin at the 69th Golden Globe Awards in January 2012

In February 2005, Baccarin provided the voice for Black Canary in multiple episodes of the animated series Justice League Unlimited. She guest-starred in season two, episode seven of How I Met Your Mother as Chloe, which aired on November 6, 2006. She also guest-starred in three episodes of the television series The O.C. in 2006. Baccarin appeared in the unaired pilot episode of It's Always Sunny in Philadelphia, playing a transgender woman, Carmen. In April 2006 Baccarin was announced to be playing the adult version of recurring villain Adria in the 10th season of Stargate SG-1. She first appeared in season-10 episode "Counterstrike" as adult Adria (the younger versions of Adria were previously played by other actresses). Baccarin reprised her role in the film Stargate: The Ark of Truth.

In May 2009, Baccarin made her off-Broadway debut in Theresa Rebeck's television satire Our House at Playwrights Horizons in New York City. She landed the lead role of Anna, the leader of the alien Visitors, in ABC's 2009–2011 series V, a remake of the 1984 series. In May 2011, shortly following the airing of the show's second-season finale, producers announced that the show would not return for a third season. That same month, Baccarin joined the cast of the Showtime television drama Homeland, for which she received praise for her role as the conflicted wife of a former prisoner of war. On July 18, 2013, she was nominated for Outstanding Supporting Actress in a Drama Series at the 2013 Primetime Emmy awards for her performance.

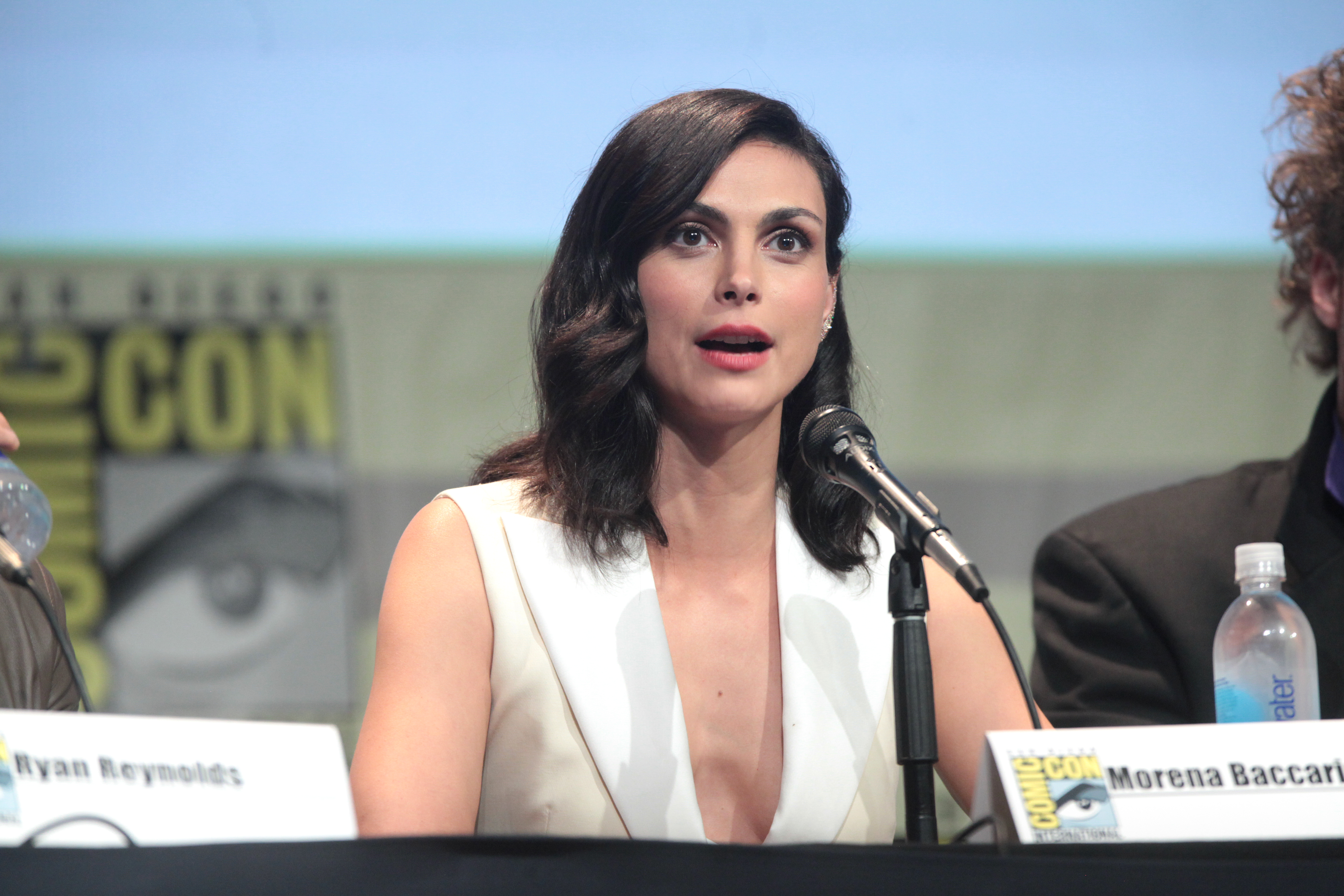
Baccarin at the 2015 San Diego Comic-Con

Baccarin appeared in the 2015 action-comedy Spy as agent Karen Walker. In 2016, Baccarin appeared in the film Deadpool as Vanessa Carlysle. She reprised her role in the 2018 sequel Deadpool 2. In 2015, Baccarin began a leading role as Dr. Leslie Thompkins in the Fox show Gotham. She portrayed the character in all five seasons of the show. She also played a recurring role as Erica Flynn, a woman who murdered her husband, and a romantic interest of Patrick Jane (Simon Baker) from The Mentalist, 2013 to 2015. In 2019, she played a psychologist on the Brazilian TV series Sessão de Terapia (Therapy Session), her first production role in her native country. In 2020, Baccarin co-starred in the apocalyptic thriller Greenland. In 2023, Baccarin starred in the action film Fast Charlie. Since October 2025, she has appeared as lead Sheriff Mickey Fox in the CBS drama Sheriff Country.

== Political views and activism ==
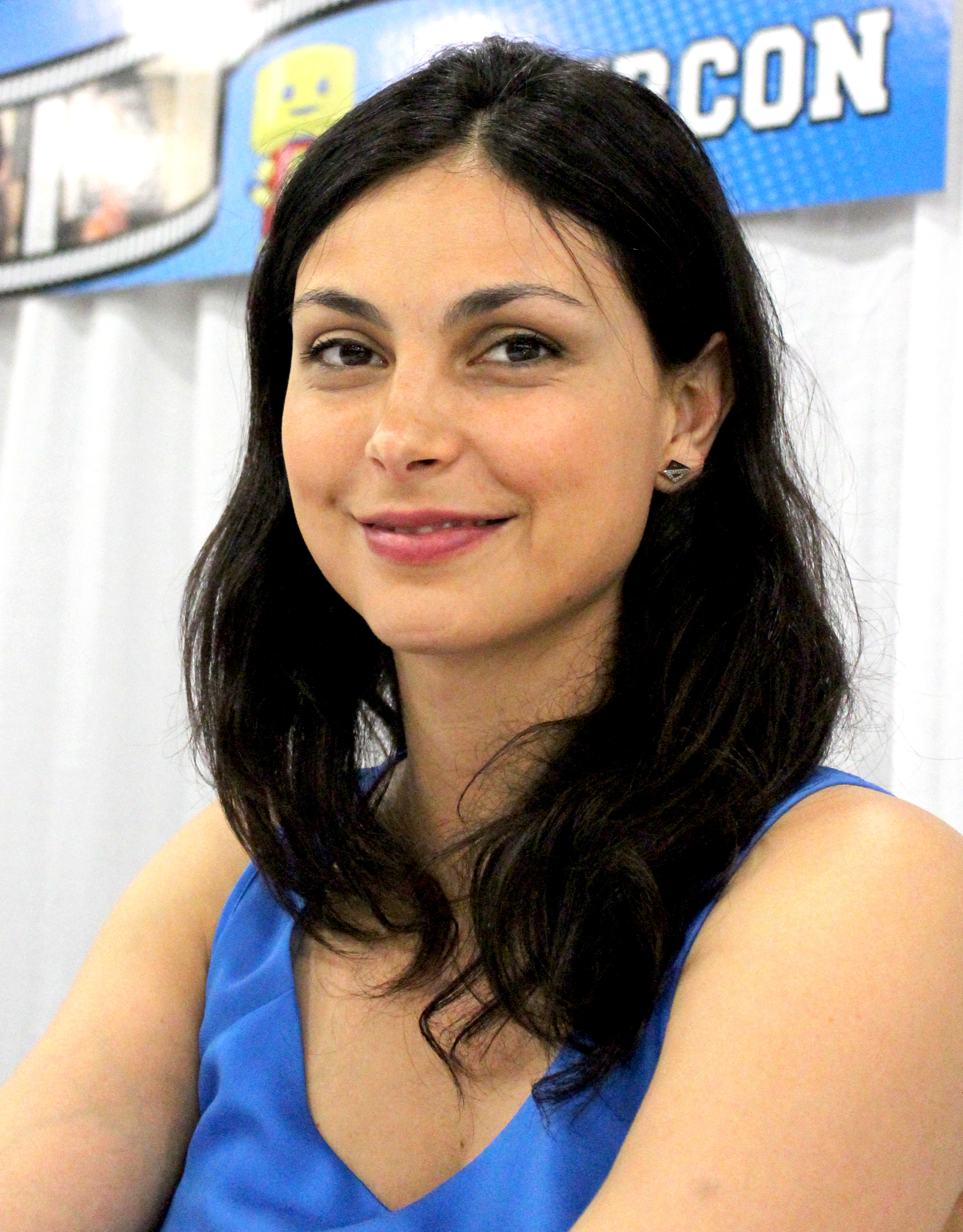
Baccarin at the 2016 Florida Supercon

In January 2019, Baccarin wrote an opinion piece in Newsweek magazine describing her experiences working with the International Rescue Committee on behalf of refugees. She was interviewing refugees from Venezuela during a trip to Colombia. She warned of an evolving situation, which could lead to an increase of refugees asking for asylum in the United States. Baccarin became an advocate for women and girls, inspired by her mother's work for women's rights in Brazil.

In 2019, together with other artists, lawyers, advocates, and refugees, she took part in the Flores Exhibits project, for which she read the sworn testimony of a 17-year-old mother from Honduras who was held in detention with her baby at the Mexico–United States border.

== Personal life ==
Baccarin dated classmate and actor Glenn Howerton at Juilliard. She was featured in the unaired pilot of his show It's Always Sunny in Philadelphia as Carmen. The role was later recast with Brittany Daniel.

In November 2011, Baccarin married American film producer and director Austin Chick, and they have a son.

In July 2015, Chick filed for divorce, citing irreconcilable differences. Around that time, Baccarin began dating her Gotham co-star Ben McKenzie, and their daughter was born around the same time that Baccarin's divorce became official. In November 2016, Baccarin and McKenzie announced their engagement, and they were married in Brooklyn, New York, on June 2, 2017, Baccarin's 38th birthday. They also have a son.

== Filmography ==
Key
| † | Denotes works that have not yet been released |

=== Film ===
| Year | Title | Role | Notes | Ref. |
|---|---|---|---|---|
| 2001 | Perfume | Monica | | |
| 2001 | Way Off Broadway | Rebecca | | |
| 2002 | Roger Dodger | Girl in Bar | | |
| 2005 | Serenity | Inara Serra | | |
| 2008 | Death in Love | Beautiful Woman | | |
| 2008 | Stargate: The Ark of Truth | Adria | Direct-to-video | |
| 2009 | Stolen | Rose Montgomery | | |
| 2011 | Look Again | Allison | | |
| 2014 | Back in the Day | Lori | | |
| 2014 | Son of Batman | Talia al Ghul | Voice; direct-to-video | |
| 2015 | Spy | Karen Walker | | |
| 2016 | Batman: Bad Blood | Talia al Ghul | Voice; direct-to-video | |
| 2016 | Deadpool | Vanessa Carlysle | | |
| 2018 | Deadpool 2 | Vanessa Carlysle | | |
| 2019 | Framing John DeLorean | Cristina Ferrare | | |
| 2019 | Ode to Joy | Francesca | | |
| 2019 | To Your Last Death | Gamemaster | Voice | |
| 2020 | Greenland | Allison Garrity | | |
| 2021 | The Good House | Rebecca McAllister | | |
| 2022 | Last Looks | Lorena Nascimento | | |
| 2023 | Fast Charlie | Marcie Kramer | | |
| 2024 | Deadpool & Wolverine | Vanessa Carlysle | | |
| 2024 | Millers in Marriage | Tina | | |
| 2024 | Elevation | Nina | Also executive producer | |
| 2026 | Greenland 2: Migration | Allison Garrity | | |
| 2026 | The Wrecking Crew | Valentina | | |
| 2026 | Everyone Is Lying to You for Money | Herself | Documentary; made by her husband Ben McKenzie | |
| 2026 | Masters of the Universe | Sorceress of Castle Grayskull | | |

=== Television ===
| Year | Title | Role | Notes |
|---|---|---|---|
| 2002–03 | Firefly | Inara Serra | Main role |
| 2003–04 | Still Life | Maggie Jones | Main role (season 1) |
| 2005 | It's Always Sunny in Philadelphia | Carmen | Episode: "It's Always Sunny on TV" (unaired pilot) |
| 2005–06 | Justice League Unlimited | Dinah Lance / Black Canary | Voice; recurring role |
| 2006 | The O.C. | Maya Griffin | Guest role (season 3) |
| 2006 | How I Met Your Mother | Chloe | Episode: "Swarley" |
| 2006 | Justice | Lisa Cruz | Episode: "Christmas Party" |
| 2006 | Kitchen Confidential | Gia | Episode: "An Affair to Remember" |
| 2006–07 | Stargate SG-1 | Adria | Guest role (season 10) |
| 2007 | Las Vegas | Sara Samari | Episode: "The Burning Bedouin" |
| 2007 | Heartland | Nurse Jessica Kivala | Guest role (season 1) |
| 2007 | Sands of Oblivion | Alice Carter | Television film |
| 2008 | Dirt | Claire Leland | Episode: "And the Winner Is" |
| 2008 | Numbers | Lynn Potter | Episode: "Blowback" |
| 2009 | Medium | Brooke Hoyt | Episode: "All in the Family" |
| 2009–11 | V | Anna | Main role (seasons 1–2) |
| 2010 | The Deep End | Beth Bancroft | Unaired pilot |
| 2011 | Batman: The Brave and the Bold | Cheetah | Voice; episode: "Triumvirate of Terror!" |
| 2011 | Look Again | Allison | Television film |
| 2011–13 | Homeland | Jessica Brody | Main role (seasons 1–3) |
| 2011–14 | The Mentalist | Erica Flynn | Guest role (seasons 3–4, 7) |
| 2012, 2013 | The Good Wife | Isobel Swift | 2 episodes |
| 2014 | Warriors | Tory | Unsold pilot |
| 2014 | The Red Tent | Rachel | Miniseries |
| 2014–23 | The Flash | Gideon | Voice; 34 episodes (uncredited) |
| 2015–19 | Gotham | Leslie Thompkins | Recurring role (season 1); main role (seasons 2–5) |
| 2019 | A Series of Unfortunate Events | Beatrice Baudelaire | 2 episodes |
| 2019 | Sessão de Terapia | Dr. Sofia Callas | Guest role (season 4); 9 episodes |
| 2020 | The Twilight Zone | Michelle Weaver / Phineas Lowell | Episode: "Downtime" |
| 2021 | Home Invasion | Casie | Main role |
| 2022 | Beat Bobby Flay | Herself | Guest host; episode: "Morena and the Marcona" |
| 2022 | The Endgame | Elena Federova | Main role |
| 2024–present | Fire Country | Mickey Fox | Guest role (3 episodes) |
| 2025–present | Sheriff Country | Mickey Fox | Main role |
| TBA | Firefly: The Animated Series † | Inara Serra | Voice; main role |

=== Video game ===
| Year | Title | Role | Notes | Ref. |
|---|---|---|---|---|
| 2017 | Destiny 2 | Sagira | Curse of Osiris DLC | |
| 2023 | Assassin's Creed Nexus VR | Dominika Wilk | Voice and likeness | |

== Awards and nominations ==
| Year | Nominated work | Association | Category | Result | Ref. |
|---|---|---|---|---|---|
| 2010 | V | Saturn Award | Best Supporting Actress on Television | Nominated | |
| 2010 | V | Scream Awards | Breakout Performance – Female | Nominated | |
| 2010 | V | NewNowNext Awards | Brink of Fame: Actor | Nominated | |
| 2011 | V | Saturn Award | Best Supporting Actress on Television | Nominated | |
| 2013 | Homeland | Primetime Emmy Award | Outstanding Supporting Actress in a Drama Series | Nominated | |
| 2013 | Homeland | Screen Actors Guild Award | Outstanding Performance by an Ensemble in a Drama Series | Nominated | |
| 2016 | Deadpool | MTV Movie Awards | Best Female Performance | Nominated | |
| 2016 | Deadpool | MTV Movie Awards | Best Kiss (with Ryan Reynolds) | Nominated | |
| 2016 | Deadpool | Teen Choice Awards | Choice Movie Actress: Action | Nominated | |
| 2016 | Deadpool | Imagen Awards | Best Actress – Feature Film | Nominated | |
