= Marina Abramović: The Artist Is Present =

- Film poster
- Directed by: Matthew Akers; Jeff Dupre
- Produced by: Maro Chermayeff; Jeff Dupre
- Cinematography: Matthew Akers
- Edited by: E. Donna Shepherd; Jim Hession
- Music by: Nathan Halpern
- Distributed by: Music Box Films
- Release dates: January 20, 2012 (Sundance); June 13, 2012
- Running time: 106 minutes
- Country: United States
- Language: English
- Box office: $156,695

Marina Abramović: The Artist Is Present is a 2012 American documentary film directed by Matthew Akers and Jeff Dupre about the performance artist Marina Abramović. It debuted at the 2012 Sundance Film Festival and was produced by HBO Documentary Films.

== Summary ==
The documentary chronicles her career and shows the preparations for her 2010 exhibition The Artist Is Present, held at the Museum of Modern Art in New York City.

== Reception ==
On the review aggregator website Rotten Tomatoes, 96% of 47 critics' reviews are positive, with an average rating of 7.7/10. Metacritic, which uses a weighted average, assigned the film a score of 74 out of 100, based on 18 critics, indicating "generally favorable" reviews.

== Legacy ==
The documentary was spoofed in the series Documentary Now! in a 2019 episode featuring Cate Blanchett as the artist.
