= The Investigation: A Search for the Truth in Ten Acts =

Live reading of Mueller Report excerpts

- Written by: Robert Schenkkan

Premiere
- Date: June 24, 2019
- Place: Riverside Church, New York City, New York, U.S.

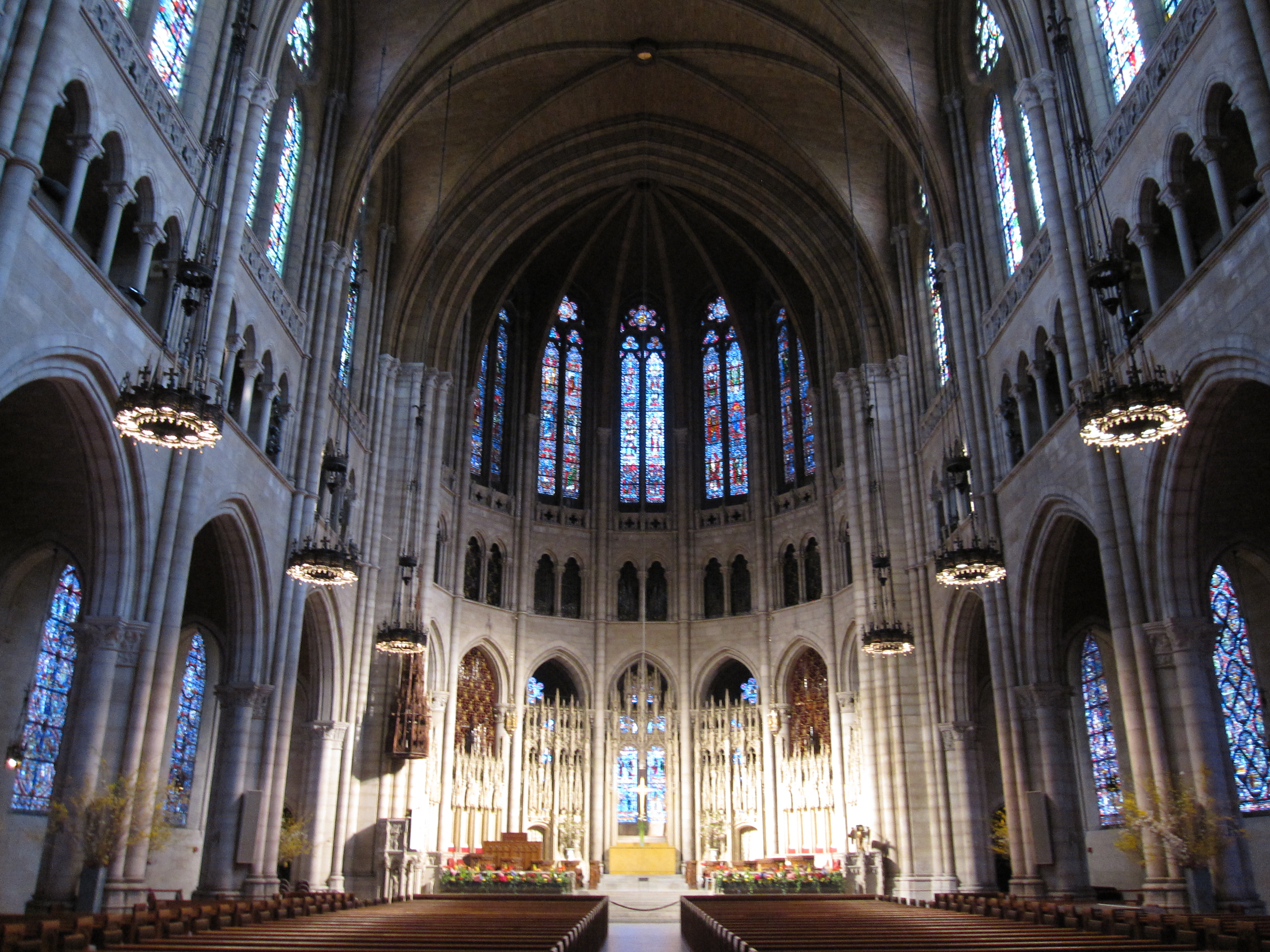
The reading took place at Riverside Church in New York City.

The Investigation: A Search for Truth in Ten Acts (also known as The Investigation: A Crime in Ten Acts) was a live reading of excerpts from the Mueller Report, performed at New York City's Riverside Church on June 24, 2019. Actors and readers included John Lithgow as President Donald Trump, Kevin Kline as Robert Mueller, Joel Grey as Jeff Sessions, Jason Alexander as Chris Christie, and Alfre Woodard as Hope Hicks. Also participating were Annette Bening, Mark Hamill, Wilson Cruz, Justin Long, Julia Louis-Dreyfus, Alyssa Milano, Ben McKenzie, Piper Perabo, Zachary Quinto, Michael Shannon, and Sigourney Weaver. The Investigation was written by Robert Schenkkan.

== Cast ==
- Annette Bening as Narrator
- John Lithgow as President Donald Trump
- Kevin Kline as Robert S. Mueller III
- Jason Alexander as Chris Christie
- Wilson Cruz as Rob Porter
- Noah Emmerich as Steve Bannon/Felix Sater
- Gina Gershon as K. T. McFarland/Rick Gates
- Joel Grey as Jeff Sessions
- Mark Hamill as Himself
- Justin Long as James Comey
- Julia Louis-Dreyfus as Herself
- John Malkovich as Himself
- Ben McKenzie as Michael Flynn/Donald Trump Jr.
- Alyssa Milano as Annie Donaldson/Jay Sekulow
- Bill Moyers as Himself (Introduction)
- Piper Perabo as Rob Goldstone/Jared Kushner
- Aidan Quinn as Michael Cohen
- Zachary Quinto as Rod Rosenstein/Rudy Giuliani/William Barr
- Kyra Sedgwick as Sarah Sanders
- Michael Shannon as Don McGahn
- Sigourney Weaver as Herself
- Frederick Weller as Reince Priebus/Paul Manafort
- Alfre Woodard as Hope Hicks
