= Vera Setta =

Brazilian actress (b. 1950)

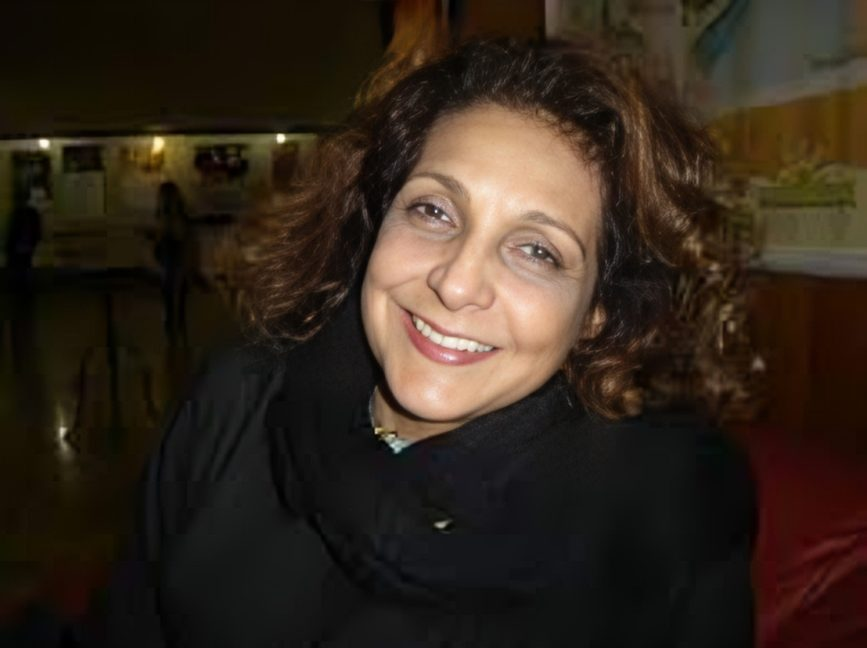
- Born: Vera Lúcia Silva de Vaz Setta; October 1, 1950 (age 75); Rio de Janeiro, Brazil
- Occupations: Actress, theater producer
- Spouse: Fernando Baccarin
- Children: Morena Baccarin

Vera Lúcia Silva de Vaz Setta (born October 1, 1950) is a Brazilian actress and theatrical producer.

She is the sister of actor Ivan Setta and the mother of actress Morena Baccarin.

== Filmography ==
=== Cinema ===
- Ipanema Toda Nua (1971)
- Luz, Cama, Ação! (1976)
- Simbad, O Marujo Trapalhão (1976)
- O Vampiro de Copacabana (1976)
- O Trapalhão nas Minas do Rei Salomão (1977) ... Bruxa
- Pequenas Taras (1978)
- Se Segura, Malandro! (1978) .... Marlene
- A Noiva da Cidade (1978)
- O Mágico e o Delegado (1983)

=== Theatre ===
At some point before March 18, 2010, Vera participated in productions of The Vagina Monologues, directed by Miguel Falabella and working with Mara Manzan and Fafy Siqueira in one season, and Totia Meireles and Cissa Guimarães in another season.
