= Matthew Akers =

American film producer (born 1975)

- Born: November 19, 1975 (age 50); Dallas, Texas, U.S.
- Occupations: Director, producer, cinematographer, photographer
- Years active: 2000–present

Matthew Akers (born November 19, 1975) is an American film director, producer, cinematographer, and photographer. He is best known for the critically acclaimed documentary Marina Abramović: The Artist Is Present, (2012) for which he won a Peabody and Emmy Award. He recently directed two primetime ABC television specials for David Blaine, Real or Magic (2013) and Beyond Magic (2016), which featured Blaine performing magic for various celebrities and public figures.

== Early life and education ==
Akers was born and raised in Dallas, Texas. He studied fine art and sculpture at the School of Visual Arts.

== Career ==
Akers has shot and produced over a dozen documentary television series, including the 10-part series Carrier (2008) during which he lived on an aircraft carrier in the Persian Gulf for six months, and Circus, (2010) in which he spent a year on the road traveling with the Big Apple Circus.

In 2010 he was approached by his friend and producer, Jeff Dupre, to make a film about the performance artist Marina Abramović. He was skeptical at first, but Abramovic gave him the keys to her apartment and full access to document her life in the months leading up to her performance at The Museum of Modern Art. 'The show became an art world and pop culture phenomenon, as hundreds of people lined up for hours for a chance to sit with Abramović – the 'grandmother of performance art.'

The film itself is a "mesmerizing cinematic journey inside the world of a radical performance artist who draws no distinction between life and art." The New Yorker called the film an "epic in its own right," alluding to the fact that Akers logged some 1400 hours of footage, before editing it down to 105 minutes. The film offers an inside look at the exhaustive process involved in successfully producing an artistic performance of such a grand scale, and attempts to bring Marina's art to the masses.

== Filmography ==
Year	Title	Director	Writer	Cinematographer	Producer	Notes
2000	EGG, The Arts Show			Yes		
2008	Carrier				Yes	Field producer
2010	Circus			Yes	Yes	
2012	Marina Abramović: The Artist Is Present	Yes		Yes		
2013	David Blaine: Real or Magic	Yes	Yes	Yes	Yes	
2016	David Blaine: Beyond Magic	Yes	Yes	Yes	Yes	Executive producer
2025	Everyone Is Lying to You for Money			Yes		
