= Everyone Is Lying to You for Money =

- Theatrical release poster
- Directed by: Ben McKenzie
- Written by: Ben McKenzie
- Produced by: Giorgio Angelini; Ben McKenzie
- Cinematography: Matthew Akers; Giorgio Angelini; Neil Brandvold; Victor Peña
- Edited by: Drew Blatman; Jen Mackie
- Music by: Martin Crane
- Distributed by: The Forge
- Release dates: November 16, 2025 (DOC NYC); April 17, 2026
- Running time: 90 minutes
- Country: United States
- Languages: English; Spanish
- Box office: $153,433

Everyone Is Lying to You for Money is a 2025 American documentary film which explores the cryptocurrency industry. It was produced, written, and directed by Ben McKenzie. It was given a limited theatrical release on April 17, 2026.

== Production ==
Production took place over three years, helmed by the duo of actor-turned-filmmaker McKenzie and producer Giorgio Angelini. The film was self-financed by McKenzie.

A highly personal project (Morena Baccarin, McKenzie's wife appears in the movie as well), McKenzie directed, wrote, produced, and starred in the documentary. The film was initiated as part of research for the 2023 book Easy Money: Cryptocurrency, Casino Capitalism, and the Golden Age of Fraud, which McKenzie wrote with journalist Jacob Silverman, building off McKenzie's efforts and growing profile as a cryptocurrency skeptic and critic.

== Release ==
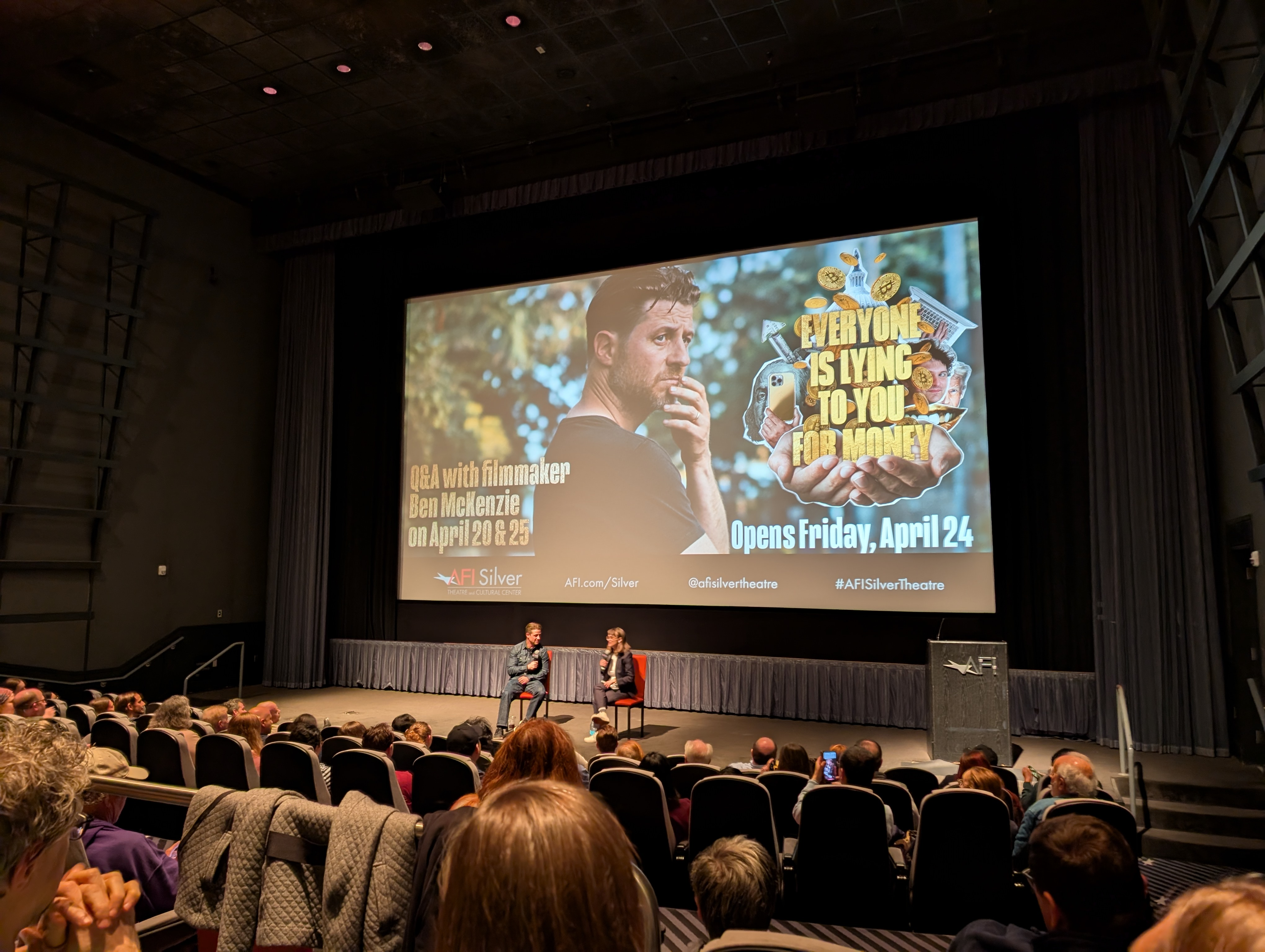
Ben McKenzie (L) & Alexis Goldstein doing a Q&A for the film at AFI Silver in April 2026

The film had its world premiere on June 6, 2025, as part of the inaugural SXSW London festival. It also played at the 2025 DOC NYC film festival, the 2025 Mill Valley Film Festival, and the Miami Film Festival in April 2026.

In March 2025, the independent distributor The Forge acquired distribution and sales rights. The film received a limited theatrical release beginning April 17, 2026, and was later released on VOD. To forgo paying a percentage of sales and promotion to major streaming services, McKenzie chose to release the film on Eventive, a digital platform specializing in distributing indie projects without the need of a subscription. In November 2026, the film started streaming on the independent documentary platform C5.NOW, and independent documentary platform from media company Channel 5.

== Reception ==
On the review aggregator website Rotten Tomatoes, 100% of 21 critics' reviews are positive. Metacritic, which uses a weighted average, assigned the film a score of 72 out of 100, based on six critics, indicating "generally favorable" reviews.

Owen Gleiberman of Variety wrote that the film is "a lively, knife-sharp, impeccably researched and reported documentary that answers every conceivable question you've ever had about crypto, and does so in a way that's brisk and funny and illuminating rather than intimidating."
