= Robert Schenkkan =

American dramatist (born 1953)

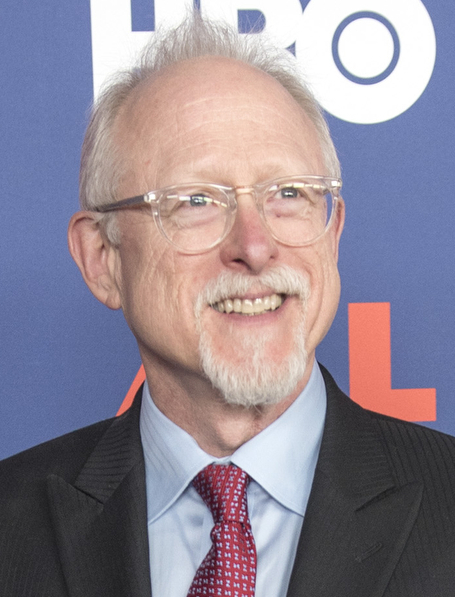
- Schenkkan in 2016
- Born: Robert Frederic Schenkkan Jr. March 19, 1953 (age 73); Chapel Hill, North Carolina, U.S.
- Education: University of Texas, Austin (BA); Cornell University (MFA)
- Occupations: Playwright, screenwriter, actor
- Spouse(s): Mary Anne Dorward (1984–1999; 2 children); Maria Dahvana Headley (2004–2012)
- Relatives: Ben McKenzie (nephew)
- Writing career
- Notable awards: Pulitzer Prize for Drama (1992) Tony Award for Best Play (2014)

Robert Frederic Schenkkan Jr. (born March 19, 1953) is an American playwright, screenwriter, and actor. He received the Pulitzer Prize for Drama in 1992 for his play The Kentucky Cycle and his play All the Way earned the 2014 Tony Award for Best Play. He has three Emmy nominations and one WGA Award.

== Early years ==
Schenkkan was born in Chapel Hill, North Carolina, the son of Jean Gregory (née McKenzie) and Robert Frederic Schenkkan, a professor in the Department of Radio-Television-Film at The University of Texas at Austin, and public television executive. He grew up in Austin, Texas. As a Plan II Honors student he received a B.A. in drama, magna cum laude, from the University of Texas, Austin in 1975 (Phi Beta Kappa, Friars' Society, UT Texas Exes Distinguished Young Alumnus Award and E. William Doty College of Fine Arts Distinguished Alumnus Award), and an M.F.A. in Theatre Arts from Cornell University in 1977. For many years, he lived in New York City and then Los Angeles, California, working both as a writer and an actor in film, television, and theatre. Since 1990 he has focused exclusively on his writing and divides his time between New York City and Seattle. Schenkkan is of Dutch-Jewish (father), and Scottish and English (mother) descent.

== Career ==
Schenkkan is the author of ten full-length plays. By the Waters of Babylon premiered at the Oregon Shakespeare Festival in February, 2005. The play is unrelated to the Stephen Vincent Benét short story By the Waters of Babylon or its subsequent adaptation. Lewis and Clark Reach the Euphrates premiered at the Mark Taper Forum in Los Angeles in December 2005. The Marriage of Miss Hollywood and King Neptune premiered at the University of Texas at Austin in November 2005. The Devil and Daniel Webster premiered at the Seattle Children's Theatre in February 2006.

Handler, a play dealing with a snake handling church, premiered at the Actors Express Theatre in Atlanta, Georgia. Heaven On Earth won the Julie Harris/Beverly Hills Theatre Guild Award, participated in the Eugene O'Neill Playwright's Conference, and premiered Off-Broadway at the WPA Theatre. Final Passages premiered at the Studio Arena theatre. Tachinoki premiered at the Ensemble Studio Theatre in Los Angeles and was designated a Critic's Choice by the LA Weekly. His other play for young audiences, The Dream Thief, had its premier at Milwaukee's First Stage.

Schenkkan has written numerous one-act plays which are collected together and published by Dramatists Play Service as Conversations With the Spanish Lady. Among them is The Survivalist which premiered at Actors Theatre of Louisville's Humana festival, went on to the EST Marathon in NYC, Canada's DuMaurier Festival, and the Edinburgh Festival where it won the "Best of the Fringe" award.

The Kentucky Cycle underwent several years of development, starting in New York City at New Dramatists and the Ensemble Studio Theatre. The two part epic was later workshopped at the Mark Taper Forum, EST-LA, the Long Wharf Theatre, and the Sundance Institute. The complete "cycle" was awarded the largest grant ever given by the Fund for New American Plays and had its world premiere in 1991 at the Intiman Theatre in Seattle (Liz Huddle, producer) where it set box office records. In 1992, it was the centerpiece of the Mark Taper forum's 25th Anniversary Season. It was awarded the Pulitzer Prize for Drama, the first time in the history of the award that a play was so honored which had not first been presented in New York City. It also won both the PEN Centre West and the L.A. Drama Critics Circle Award for Best Play. In 1993 it appeared at the John F. Kennedy Center in Washington, D.C., and opened on Broadway in November of that year where it was nominated for a Tony, Drama Desk, and Outer Critics Circle awards.

His play All the Way, about the behind-the-scenes political maneuvering of President Lyndon Baines Johnson to pass the Civil Rights Act of 1964, premiered at the Oregon Shakespeare Festival on July 28, 2012. Schenkkan describes this work as a play about "the morality of politics and power." All the Way won the 2012 ATCA/Steinberg Award for Best Play and the inaugural Edward M. Kennedy Prize for Drama Inspired by History. It opened in Boston at the American Repertory Theater on September 19, 2013, starring Bryan Cranston and sold out its entire run. The play had its Broadway premiere on March 6, 2014, at the Neil Simon Theatre, and was awarded the 2014 Tony Award for Best Play, with Cranston also winning a Tony Award for his performance as Lyndon Baines Johnson. A sequel, titled The Great Society, premiered at the Oregon Shakespeare Festival in July 2014 and on Broadway in September 2019. Additionally he wrote Building the Wall in the run-up to the 2016 Presidential election.

Schenkkan's film work includes: The Quiet American, directed by Phillip Noyce and starring Michael Caine (who received an Oscar nomination). For television he wrote four episodes of The Pacific (HBO, 2010) for which he was nominated for two Emmy Awards and won a WGA Award for Best Miniseries writing. Other television work includes The Andromeda Strain (A&E, 2009), Spartacus (USA Network, 2006), and Crazy Horse (TNT). In 2005, he was hired by Sony Pictures to develop a script based on Marvel Comics' Killraven. Schenkkan was also named as the writer for the adaptation of the comic book Incognito published by the Marvel imprint Icon Comics. In 2016, his television adaptation of All the Way was filmed for HBO, with Cranston reprising his role as Lyndon Baines Johnson, and premiered in May. Also that year, he co-wrote the war drama film Hacksaw Ridge, directed by Mel Gibson.

Schenkkan is the recipient of grants from New York State, the California Arts Council, and the Vogelstein and the Arthur foundations. He is a New Dramatists alumnus and a member of the Ensemble Studio Theatre and the National Theatre Conference. He was the 2012 Thornton Wilder Fellow at the MacDowell Colony and a member of the College of Fellows of the American Theater.

As an actor, Schenkkan has appeared in numerous roles, including the 1989 film Out Cold; he also starred in the 1990 cult drama teen film Pump Up the Volume, in which he played David Deaver, the high school guidance counselor. He appeared as Lieutenant Commander Dexter Remmick in the Star Trek: The Next Generation episodes "Coming of Age" and "Conspiracy".

== Personal life ==
Schenkkan has been married twice. His first marriage was to Mary Anne Dorward in 1984, they had two children, Sarah Schenkkan and Joshua Schenkkan. The couple divorced in 1999. His second marriage was to the writer Maria Dahvana Headley in 2004. They divorced in 2012. Schenkkan is an uncle of actor Ben McKenzie.

== Filmography ==
=== Film ===
Year	Title	Role	Notes
1974	The Hunt	The Confederate Soldier	
1984	Places in the Heart	Texas Voice #2 (voice)	
1985	Chain Letters	Rick	
1986	Sweet Liberty	Helicopter Pilot	
1986	The Manhattan Project	Government Aide	
1987	The Bedroom Window	State Attorney Peters	
1987	Amazing Grace and Chuck	Pollack	
1989	Out Cold	Sgt. Roberts	
1990	Pump Up the Volume	David Deaver	

=== Television ===
Year	Title	Role	Notes
1979	Sanctuary of Fear	Father Wembley	TV movie
1982	The Neighborhood	Neighbor	TV movie
1983	Murder in Coweta County	Wilson Turner	TV movie
1984	George Washington	Alexander Hamilton	Miniseries
1985	Kane & Abel	Jack Thomas	Miniseries
1986	The Twilight Zone	Eli	Episode: Devil's Alphabet
1986	Act of Vengeance	Paul Gilly	TV movie
1986	Newhart	Jonathan Curtis	Episode: Sweet and Sour Charity
1987	Nutcracker: Money, Madness and Murder	Campbell	Miniseries
1987	Beverly Hills Buntz	Mayhew	Episode: A Christmas Carol
1988	Star Trek: The Next Generation	Lt. Cmdr. Dexter Remmick	2 Episodes
1988	Santa Barbara	Brent Livingston	5 episodes
1988	Police Story: The Watch Commander		TV movie
1989	Hard Time on Planet Earth	DeSalvo	Episode: Stranger in a Strange Land
1989	Hooperman	Russell	Episode: Love Bytes
1990	The Image	Wilton Hale	TV movie
1990	Amen	Todd	Episode: The Honeymoon
1990	Revealing Evidence: Stalking the Honolulu Strangler		TV movie
1990	Lifestories		Episode: Rebecca McManus and Steve Arnold
1991	L.A. Law	Dr. Gregory	Episode: "New Kidney on the Block"
1991	In Broad Daylight	Rev. Don Douglas	TV movie
1991	Son of the Morning Star	Capt. Weir	Miniseries
1993	Victim of Love: The Shannon Mohr Story		TV movie
1994	Keys	Ry Bimstone/Cyrus Rockworth	TV movie

=== Writer ===
Year	Title	Notes
1996	Crazy Horse	TV movie
2002	The Quiet American	
2004	Spartacus	TV movie
2008	The Andromeda Strain	Miniseries
2010	The Pacific	Miniseries
2016	All the Way	TV movie
2016	Hacksaw Ridge	
2019	The Investigation: A Search for the Truth in Ten Acts	Video
