= Bloat (film) =

2025 horror film by Pablo Absento

- Official release poster
- Directed by: Pablo Absento
- Written by: Pablo Absento
- Produced by: Maria Zatulovskaya; Timur Bekmambetov
- Starring: Ben McKenzie; Bojana Novakovic; Sawyer Jones; Malcolm Fuller; Kane Kosugi
- Cinematography: Denis Saprykin
- Edited by: Aleksandr Kletsov; Ilya Zevakin
- Music by: Fedor Pereverzeb
- Production companies: Bazelevs Company; Flag; Overland Pictures; Pulsar Content; XYZ Films
- Distributed by: Lionsgate; Grindstone Entertainment Group
- Release date: March 7, 2025
- Running time: 86 minutes
- Countries: France; United States; Japan
- Languages: English; Japanese

Bloat is a 2025 screenlife horror film written and directed by Pablo Absento in his film directorial debut. It stars Ben McKenzie, Bojana Novakovic, Sawyer Jones, Malcolm Fuller and Kane Kosugi. The film is about a family of four vacationing in Japan when they feel something is wrong with the youngest son, after he almost drowns in a lake.

== Plot ==
The film opens with home video footage of Hannah giving birth to a stillborn daughter, Ava. This tragic event casts a lingering shadow over the family, comprising Hannah, her husband Jack, and their two sons, Steve and Kyle. In an attempt to heal, Jack plans a family vacation to Japan. However, escalating military tensions in the Middle East force Jack, a NATO AI operator, to remain at his post, leaving Hannah and the boys to proceed with the trip alone.

Upon arriving in Japan, Hannah and her sons settle into an Airbnb in Tokyo. During an excursion to a remote mountain town, Kyle nearly drowns in a lake but is saved by a family friend, Iriko, a nurse. This incident marks the beginning of unsettling changes in Kyle's behavior.

Post-accident, Kyle exhibits bizarre behaviors: an obsession with cucumbers, aggression towards his brother Steve, and episodes of vomiting green bile. Hannah attributes these changes to trauma, but Jack, monitoring the situation remotely through video calls and messages, suspects a supernatural cause. His research leads him to the legend of the Kappa, a Japanese water spirit known for possessing children.

As Kyle's condition worsens, Jack enlists the help of his friend Ryan to investigate the Kappa legend further. Meanwhile, Hannah struggles with her own mental health, exacerbated by prescription drug use. In a video call Ryan spots and tries to shoot the kappa and after he fires the gun he is attacked by it. The family's situation deteriorates, culminating in a violent incident where Kyle bites Steve, prompting Jack to take decisive action.

Jack goes to Japan, confronting the possessed Kyle in a desperate attempt to save his son. He finds his wife dead and he sets the Airbnb house on fire to save his son. At the end of the film Jack is on trial and the lawyer ask his two sons, Steve and Kyle if Jack is a good father, the two kids gave a positive statement about their father.

== Cast ==
- Ben McKenzie as Jack
- Bojana Novakovic as Hannah
- Sawyer Jones as Kyle
- Malcolm Fuller as Steve
- Kane Kosugi as Ryan
- Ethan Herschenfeld as Judge Richard Resnick
- Asha Etchison as Reporter
- David Gibson as Jack's Father
- Rebecca Nelson as Jack's Mother
- Hiroshi Watanabe as Monk
- James Adam Lim as Police Officer #2
- Miyu Yokota as Sakura
- David Lavine as Forensic Expert
- Larry Bull as Defense Attorney
- Jeff Applegate as Col. William Bradley
- Akiyo Komatsu as Officer Ikeda
- Zack Niizato as Doctor

== Production ==
Pulsar Content and XYZ Films teamed up to handle sales on Bloat. The film is an international co-production between Bazelevs Company and Flag Co. Ltd.

Written and directed by Pablo Absento, filming began in New York City and wrapped in Tokyo in October. The post-production was completed in mid 2023. The film marks the second collaboration of Bazelevs Company and Pulsar Content.

== Release ==
The film was released in theaters and VOD on March 7, 2025, under Lionsgate.

== Reception ==
On the review aggregator website Rotten Tomatoes, 29% of 14 critics' reviews are positive, with an average rating of 4.0/10. Metacritic, which uses a weighted average, assigned the film a score of 40 out of 100, based on four critics, indicating "mixed or average" reviews.

For Starburst magazine, Jack Bottomley rated it 3/5 stars writing in the conclusion of his review: "Still, for fans of the many genres being blended, there is something to see here, even if Bloat could have been more." For Dread Central, Mary Beth McAndrews rated it 3/5 stars and wrote that "while Bloat is a refreshing take on the subgenre, especially through its attempts to discuss Japanese lore and yokai, a jumbled plot keeps the new screen life film from ach."

Giving 1 and a half stars out of 4 Marya E. Gates of RogerEbert.com wrote; "Despite a fiery penultimate scene, Absento’s film ends with a courtroom whimper."
