= Media and teen relationships =

In 2011, the average number of televisions per household in the United States was 2.5 with 31% of Americans owning four or more televisions. Research shows that the average American watches over 4 hours of television each day. Leading television networks reach approximately 60% of television viewers in the United States per week on average. A study conducted in, 2005 by the Kaiser Family Foundation determined that eight to eighteen-year-olds spend on average six and a half hours a day with media in general. American teenagers alone spend 11.2 hours watching television a week according to another market research study conducted by Teen Research Unlimited. They also found that these teens listen to FM radio 10.1 hours per week, spend 3.1 hours playing video games per week, and surf online for a total of 16.7 hours per week. MTV is the favored television channel to watch among both boys and girls in America, averaging over six hours a week viewing it. Research also shows that on any day a teenager is exposed to over 200 cable television networks, 5,500 magazines, 10,500 radio stations, over 30 million websites, and over 122,000 recently published books. Multiple forms of media can be seen throughout society in almost every facet.

== Prime-time television ==
One in four teenagers report that television is their most frequented and useful source of sexual information. The prime time content of television that is most commonly viewed by teenagers is analyzed for their sexual messages. Studies have shown that sexual references are made anywhere from 8 to 10 times during 1 hour of prime time television. Teenagers between the ages of 13 and 15 claim that media entertainment is the number one source of information about sexuality. According to the American Psychological Association, they estimate that teenagers are exposed to 14,000 sexual references per year on television (Media Influence on Youth, 2001). In a study conducted on prime time television in 1971, it was found that 18.3% of the featured characters were women where the rest were men. A different study conducted in 1974 found that 70% of the characters who gave demands or assumed a serious role in prime time television were men, leaving only 30% as women. Today, awards shows such as the Fox Teen Choice Awards present categories titled "choice hottie female" and "choice hottie male". In the music category, there is an award that goes to the best "hook up song". This is encouraging teens to "hook up" with each other and view other males and females as a "hottie". The Super Bowl, for example, is one of the most viewed prime time shows to ever be broadcast. Super Bowl 2012 alone tuned in 111.3 million viewers setting the U.S. television ratings record for the third year in a row. With advertisements fighting to stand out, companies such as GoDaddy (featuring the race car sensation Danica Patrick and trainer Jillian Michaels) and Kia Motors (featuring supermodel Adriana Lima) resorted to sex and the sexualization of their actresses.

Young girls are starting to hit puberty earlier than most young girls in the past. These young girls are not ready to deal with the issues of sexuality. Jane Brown, a journalism professor at the University of North Carolina, claims that "Twelve to fourteen year old girls who start puberty earlier are more interested in sexual content in the media." Her studies have shown that adolescents who watched a lot of sexual content in the media are more than twice as likely as others to have sex by the time they reached the age of sixteen.

== Magazine portrayals and beauty myth: "what boys like" ==
The Beauty Myth, a term coined by author Naomi Wolf, is used to describe the theory that beauty itself is a socially constructed value. Wolf discusses how unattainable standards of beauty are used against women when they are unable to conform and achieve these ideal standards. Psychologist Carol Gilligan believes that love depends on being in a relationship (meaning being in sync with another person): connected by a bond of equality and mutuality. "Both love and democracy depend on voice," she believes. Seventeen Magazine's November 2006 issue featured an article describing how a boy would be most likely to stay with a girl who would "rub on his sunscreen", "plan stuff", and "support him". Cosmopolitan magazine in past issues feature articles with titles like "The Sex Position He Craves" and "His Secret Pleasure Zone". In Cosmopolitan's August 2011 issue includes on the front cover "Guys Rate 50 Sex Moves: Thousands of Men Rank the Hot and Not-So-Hot Things You Can Do to Their Naked Bodies" as well as "The Sexy Confidence Men Can't Resist". There is plenty that tells girls what guys like, but barely anything that says what women and girls should make clear that they deserve. There are always articles like "The Sex Positions HE Craves" or "HIS Secret Pleasure Zone" but rarely the other way around. Positive aspects about magazines such as Seventeen: they always include a health section labeled "Sex Ed" with accurate facts.

"Men look at women. Women watch themselves being looked at. This determines not only most relations between men and women but also the relation of women to themselves. The surveyor of woman in herself is male: the surveyed female. Thus she turns herself into an object- and most particularly, an object of vision: a sight." This idea can be summed together by what is called the male gaze.

== Health concerns with females and media ==
When a survey was conducted to teenage girls, they claimed that the media was the primary source of information about health issues. A study was conducted on mass media magazines and it was found that women's magazines had 10.5 times more advertisements and articles that promote weight loss than men's magazines (National Association of Social Workers, 2001). After an analysis of 21 popular young women's magazine covers, it was shown that 78 percent represented a message about bodily appearance. What's shocking is that none of men's magazines contained those types of messages (Collins, 2002). Female fashion models are advertised everywhere, and it is found that female fashion models weigh twenty three percent less than the average female. According to the American Association of University Women in 1991, most teenage girls thought that their appearance is a major part of self-esteem. More girls than boys search the internet for health, fitness, and dieting information (National Association of Social Workers, 2001). Girls between the ages of 15 and 18 who said they used weight control pills in the last year, 73 percent of them were readers of health and fitness magazines. A big thanks to advertisements; teenage girls and young women spend over $4 billion each year on cosmetics (Collins, 2002). Excessive social media use is said to be associated with multiple psychological problems such as anxiety, depression and loneliness. Health related issue that have known to effect teens are depression with signs and symptoms of low self esteem due to the amount of time they are spending on social media and the pressure of keeping an image to impress other peers. Teens have often feel emotionally invested in their social media accounts, an anxiety inducing pressure that they must respond quickly and have perfect picture and captions posted (Gordon, S. 2018). Throughout different social media platforms, young women were stressed about being "visible" by exposing their faces or bodies or emotional distress and mental health. They created a fear of how they were viewed towards others and how viewers would see them. Comments that related to appearance, even if positive, were seen as or even more likely to create higher feelings of self-objectification as much as negative appearance-related comments. Self-objectification in girls at an early age was suggested to contribute to depression, sexual dysfunction, and eating disorders. Mental health outcomes that have occurred in a high rate amongst young girls and women.

== Female portrayals in the media ==
Writers and researchers such as M. Gigi Durham feel that the sexuality of females, not only in the United States but throughout the world, is extremely "exploitative, abusive, and harmful." Just from child trafficking and prostitution alone, two million children (with the majority being girls) are estimated to fall victim to Sexual abuse. Facts like this one are taken into account when thinking about the certain effect groups such as the Spice Girls have had on younger audiences. Children, mostly girls, in elementary school consist of the Spice Girls' bulk audience. The Spice Girls are most often seen wearing very high heels and exceedingly short skirts (with the exception of Sporty Spice). While some may see this as a way to show young girls a means of healthy expression, others may see this as detrimental to body image. Other more recent celebrities that fit right into this kind of image display include the Pussycat Dolls, Paris Hilton, or Kim Kardashian. The coauthor of the book Manifesta, Jennifer Baumgardner, believes that when young girls wear stiletto heals and belt out to the Spice Girls songs they are actually engaging in a "spirit of 'fierce, fun independence." There are also others who refer to the girls who engage in this sort of behavior as "prosti-tots" and "kinderwhores". There are numerous studies that have been conducted that suggest that the higher amount of mainstream media girls buy into, the higher level of importance they place on being beautiful, sexy, and desirable. To go right along with this, other studies have shown that teenage girls and college girls who "hold conventional beliefs about femininity- especially those that emphasize beauty and pleasing behavior- are less ambitious and more likely to be depressed than their peers." These girls are also less likely to enjoy sexual intercourse or use condoms. A study was done where a group of female college students were exposed to a series of television commercials. The group of women were considered to be "can-do girls" enrolled in advanced math and science classes. Out of six ads, four of the ads contained neutral content like cell phones or animals. The remaining two ads contained stereotypes: a female boasting about her new acne medication and another salivating over brownie mix. The group that was exposed to the stereotyped ads actually expressed far less interest in careers related to math and science compared to the group that only saw the neutral ads. In another study, two groups of both boys and girls were asked to either try on a bathing suit or try on a sweater before taking a math test. The group of students that tried on the bathing suit prior to taking the exam showed poorer results on the test than did the group that tried on sweaters. However, the male students included in the study showed no disparity.

=== Marketing these portrayals ===
As a way to appeal to these vast crowds, major companies began selling products marketed toward young girls that teamed up with the images they were absorbing from the aforementioned celebrities. Abercrombie & Fitch started to make thong underwear with sayings such as "Wink, Wink" and "Eye Candy" stitched onto them. Similarly, Walmart sells underwear in the junior's section that say, "Who needs credit cards...?". Victoria's Secret Pink Collection, made specifically for teens, sells underwear with sayings such as "Heartbreaker", "See You Tonight", "Hello There", "Totally Hot", and other sayings along those lines. British Home Stores (BHS) makes a line of clothes aimed toward pre-teens called "Little Miss Naughty". Its selection includes push up bras and lacy thongs. Tesco started manufacturing a "Peekaboo Pole Dancing" kit in 2007. The kit came with a miniature garter belt and even fake money for stashing into it. Although great pressure from parents made Tesco revamp the product to something less suggestive, it still remains in the market.

== Disney princesses and prince charming ==
In 2000, Disney started to market its characters together which had never been done before. Prior to 2000, the Disney princesses had never been marketed aside from the film's release. After only one year of selling the new Disney Princess line, sales reached over $300 million. In 2009, sales were over $4 billion with more than 26 thousand Disney Princess items floating around the market. The largest consumers of these products are girls between the ages of two and six. Mattel saw the success of the Disney Princess line and in 2001 began to manufacture its own line of princess Barbie dolls, DVDs, toys, home decor, clothing, etc. that they marketed together as "world of girl". Some, like author and researcher Peggy Orenstein, believe that the mass production of clothes, makeup, jewelry, and a handsome and "Charming" husband could have quite the effect on girls. A more modern example of a princess/prince charming duo, and one that some consider to not be so damaging on the formation of relationships and image, is the spectacle of Bella Swan and Edward Cullen in Stephenie Meyer's Twilight series. Some say that the relationship of Bella and Edward "glamorizes dating abuse." Others see the construction of Bella's character to be enlightening for the current generation of young girls, teens and even young adults. Meyer characterizes her as incredibly clumsy, short of words, awkward, normal, bland and not sexy. Edward, the prince charming in this case, is still utterly attracted to her. His rigidity and traditional views on sexual intercourse is also a message of sexuality rarely seen in today's media.

=== "Cinderella and supergirl" ===
Peggy Orenstein states that this sort of contradiction and challenge of being it all and having it all is prevalent in the minds of girls in today's society. In a survey of over two thousand school-aged children conducted in 2006, the girls "repeatedly described a paralyzing pressure to be 'perfect': not only to get straight As and be the student body president, editor of the newspaper, and captain of the swim team but also to be 'kind and caring,' 'please everyone, be very thin, and dress right.'" Some believe that it is not realistic to expect girls and women to achieve all of this. If the media is in fact pouring out these messages, it is penetrating a large chunk of society. Studies also show that the number of girls who place great concern on their weight and looks increased between the years 2000 and 2006 which overcame their concern with matters such as schoolwork. In her book Enlightened Sexism, Susan Douglas says, "We can excel in school, play sports, go to college, aspire to- and get- jobs previously reserved for men, be working mothers, and so forth. But in exchange we must obsess about our faces, weight, breast size, clothing brands, decorating, perfectly calibrated child-rearing, about pleasing men and being envied by other women."

== Sexual double standard ==
A double standard is where a different set of codes exists for the same issue between two groups of people. In sexual terms, the double standard is that men have more sexual freedom than women.

Double standards are increasingly being presented in today's media. Much so, that it poses threat to adolescent relationships and sexual experiences. Media has been shown to directly target teen adolescents and has allowed for social stigmas to be developed. That in turn have generated double standards towards sexuality amid teen adolescent relationships. Sexuality has been presented in the media following gender stereotypes, where men are shown to have gained power as a result of their sexuality. Whereas woman are subject to being forced into this category of promiscuity. If such stereotypes are being presented in the media, young adolescents will interpret men's sexuality as being rewarded, while women's sexuality will have punishable consequences. Double standard messages presented in the media, influence adolescents attitudes towards sexuality. Gendered stereotypes are the basis for teens obtaining a reputation amongst their peers. Influences of stereotypes and double standards has promoted adolescents to care less about the physical consequences of sexual experiences and focused more on how their reputation is affected. Messages gathered from media are deciphered differently by young men and women, resulting in differences in interpretations of sexual scripts. Young women are more aware of the social stigmas that come as consequence of sexual experiences, in contrast to young men. Ultimately coming down to young adolescents becoming dominated by double standards presented in the media and society. Taking into account the various messages being broadcast in the media, it is to be understood that the messages interpreted in the media will have a direct impact on the attitudes towards double standards amongst teen relationships.

== Double articulation in the media ==
The term double articulation refers to the process of domestication of media:

1. meaning of media in daily practices
2. media as material objects that are appropriated as meaningful technologies

== Social media: Pros and cons ==
In today's society, social networking sites such as Facebook, Twitter, Tumblr, and Instagram have become a phenomenon. Nine out of ten teenagers in America have used social media (CommonSense, 2012). No matter how old the person, anyone can access these websites anywhere by using a smart phone, tablet, or laptop. Most smart phones and tablets have Facebook and Twitter already programmed into them. However, there seem to be many pros and cons to social media sites.

Social media sites such as Facebook, allow you to post statuses, pictures and videos of yourself. Facebook and Instagram seem to be more of a "competition" social media website, such as how many "likes" or comments you can get on a photo. The Center for Eating Disorders commissioned a survey about Facebook to users who are the ages of 16–40. It was found that 51 percent of the people surveyed said that seeing photos of themselves on Facebook makes them more self-conscious about their body image and weight. 31 percent said that they feel sad when they compare themselves to their friends on Facebook. Of the people surveyed, 44 percent said they spend time wishing they had the same body as a Facebook friend when they compare themselves to them, while 37 percent said they feel they need to change parts about their body when they look at people's photos on Facebook. A website called Proud2BMe.org posted a series of quotes from teenagers that describe the way they feel about body image and Facebook. "It's only the 'standard beauty' who get the 'likes' I feel like to be the hot girl, you have to be like that, or wear your shirt too low and your skirt too high." Not only is Facebook affecting the way women feel, but it is also affecting males too. A survey was given out to males who use Facebook and 40 percent of them claimed that they sometimes write negative comments about their own body in photos (Eating Disorder, 2012). However, there are some positive aspects about social media websites. Social media sites were not intended to make people feel bad about themselves; they were made to keep in touch with people. The Common Sense Media program conducted a major survey to more than one thousand 13- to 17-year-olds about social media websites. The results were actually found to be a bit surprising. Of all the people surveyed, most of them said that social media websites have more of a positive effect on their social and emotional well-being. 90 percent of the teenagers surveyed said that they have used a form of social media and 75 percent of them have a social media website. Due to the advances in technology, 51 percent said they check their social media website at least once a day. A little more than half of the teenagers said that social media websites have helped their friendships while only 4 percent said it has hurt theirs. Social media sites seem to be a bit of a confidence booster to the people who were surveyed. A fourth of the teenagers said that social media makes them feel more confident and 15 percent said it makes them feel better about themselves (Common Sense, 2012).

Forty three percent of the teenagers surveyed said that they wish they could disconnect from all of it. Some said that they want to go back to a time where there was no such thing as Facebook. 49 percent said that they would rather communicate in person, 33 percent said they would rather text, and 7 percent said they would rather communicate through social media. The CEO and founder of Common Sense media quotes "Today's 13-17 year olds are the first generation to go through their entire teen years with such an array of digital devices and platforms." Social media websites have become worldwide and will continue to expand as the years go on (Common Sense, 2012).

New York Behavioral Health found that teens ages 12–17 use social media messaging as their main source of communication. Because of this, the in-person social skills that adolescents learn by being around peers and conversing with one another are learned at a slower rate. Studies show that teens who spend the most time on their electronics are also the most isolated and depressed. Although social media allows teens to connect 24/7, excessive screen time leads to loneliness and a lack of social skills. Studies show that excessive screen time is also linked to memory deficits as well as attention deficits. People that use social media excessively tend to perform worse on cognitive tests than people who use social media lightly or not at all.

== Effects of Social Media Use on Adolescent Relationships ==
Recent research has highlighted that different types of social media use can have distinct impacts on adolescent relationships. A national study of 17,149 Canadian adolescent girls aged 11 to 15 found that intensive social media use, defined as frequent engagement to connect with others, was associated with stronger peer friendships, particularly among girls. In contrast, problematic social media use, defined by addictive or compulsive patterns, was associated with weaker family relationships for both boys and girls.

The study also observed gender and age differences in boys and girls. Girls reported higher rates of both intensive and problematic social media use than boys, and the prevalence of both increased with age. These findings suggest that the effects of social media on adolescent social connections are context-dependent, varying according to usage patterns and demographic factors.

Public health researchers have noted that interventions targeting adolescent social media use should differentiate between types of use as intensive and problematic social media usage may require different approaches to support healthy social and family relationships.
