= Scout Tufankjian =

American photojournalist

Scout Tufankjian is an Armenian-American photojournalist and author based in Brooklyn, New York. She is known for her photos of American president Barack Obama during his first presidential campaign. She is also known for her photojournalism work on the Armenian diaspora.

== Early life and education ==
Tufankjian was born in 1977 in Boston, Massachusetts, to an Armenian-American father, Allan, a lawyer, and an Irish-American mother, Betty. She grew up in the towns of Whitman and Scituate, both in Massachusetts. As a child she was not involved in the Armenian community in Massachusetts. Her knowledge of her Armenian heritage came from reading magazines and newspapers that she found at her grandparents' home. She started practicing photography in Northern Ireland at age 18.

Tufankjian attended and earned a B.A. in political science and government from Yale University in 2000.

== Career ==
From 2006 to 2008, Tufankjian covered Senator Barack Obama's campaign for President of the United States, and was the only independent journalist to follow the campaign from the run-up to his announcing his candidacy through his victory on election night. Tufankjian took more than 12,000 photographs throughout the campaign. She released a book featuring a selection of the photographs titled Yes We Can: Barack Obama's History-Making Presidential Campaign in December 2008, which sold out its initial 55,000-copy printing a month before it was released.

In 2010 she went to cover the Haiti Earthquake and its aftermath.

From 2011 to 2012, Tufankjian went to Egypt to photograph the Egyptian Revolution.

On August 15, 2012,, Tufankjian took a photo of Michelle Obama and President Barack Obama hugging each other in Dubuque, Iowa. The Obama campaign staff published the photo on their Facebook and Twitter accounts on election night, November 6. It became the most liked photo on Facebook and most retweeted tweet in history.

In 2015, Tufankjian published There is only the Earth: Images for Armenian Diaspora in commemoration of the centennial of the Armenian genocide. To build this collection, she spent six years gathering stories and photos of the Armenian people who were killed and displaced from their homes by the Ottoman government between 1915 and 1923. She gathered stories and took photos in Ethiopia, Syria, Turkey, Lebanon, Argentina, France, United States, Hong Kong, and Canada. The photos capture everyday life in the Armenian diaspora, from religious to the romantic to the familial.

== Works ==
- Images from the Middle East (2006)
- Yes We Can: Barack Obama's History-Making Presidential Campaign (2008)
- Haiti 2010 The Haitian Earthquake, A Tale of Two Camps
- Egypt 2011-2012: A Year of Revaluation
- There Is Only the Earth: Images from the Armenian Diaspora Project, Melcher Media, 2015. A photojournalist's study of the Armenian diaspora on its 100th anniversary
- Commissioned work: The HALO Trust: 100 Women in Demining (2017)
- Ongoing Projects Karabakh: 2002-2020

== Personal life ==
In 2010, Tufankjian married Nate Schenkkan, who is also a Yale and Columbia graduate and former journalist.
