= Jason Cherubini =

American media executive

Jason C. Cherubini
- Born: Jason C. Cherubini; Boston, Massachusetts, US
- Education: Tulane University
- Occupations: Media executive, film producer, business professor, consultant

Jason C. Cherubini is an American film producer, business professor, and consultant. He is a visiting professor at Nordakademie.

== Early life and education ==
Cherubini received a Bachelor of Science in Management, a Master of Business Administration, and Master of Accounting degrees from the A.B. Freeman School of Business at Tulane University in New Orleans. He is also a Certified Public Accountant, Certified Management Accountant, and a Chartered Global Management Accountant.

== Career ==
After completing his master's degrees, Cherubini worked as a financial and operations consultant, founding Seraphim Associates in Washington, DC, USA. He began teaching college courses at Loyola College and Marymount University, eventually taking the position of Assistant Professor of Business at Goucher College. He continues to hold the faculty position of Visiting Professor at Nordakademie in Hamburg, Germany. In 2014, he co-founded Dawn's Light Media with Richard Switzer and is the Chief Financial Officer.

== Publications ==
- User-Oriented IFRS Education in Introductory Accounting at U.S. Academic Institutions: Current Status and Influencing Factors Hong Zhu; Kevin T. Rich; Alfred R. Michenzi; Jason Cherubini Issues in Accounting Education (2011) 26 (4): 725–750.
- IFRS in introductory financial accounting using an integrated, comparison-based approach / Kevin T. Rich, Jason C. Cherubini, Hong Zhu Publication date 2012 Advances in accounting education; 13, 1085-4622
- IFRS in the General Business Curriculum: Why Should We Care?, Feb, 13, PER, Education Cherubini, Jason, Kevin Rich, Hong Zhu, and Alfred Michenzi
- Emotional labor in the liberal arts Emotional intelligence : current evidence from psychophysiological, educational and organizational perspectives Janine L. Bowen and Jason C. Cherubini

== Filmography ==
- The Assault (2015) – Executive Producer
- Arlo: The Burping Pig (2016) – Executive Producer
- Altitude (2016) – Executive Producer
- Christmas All Over Again (2016) – ExecutiveProducer
- Black Water (2018) - Producer
- A Dangerous Date (2017) – ExecutiveProducer
- A Mother's Worst Fear (2018) – ExecutiveProducer
- Love on Repeat (2019) – ExecutiveProducer
- In Bed With a Killer (2019) – ExecutiveProducer
- Erasing His Dark Past (2019) – ExecutiveProducer
- The Office Mix-Up (2019) – ExecutiveProducer
- Agent Toby Barks (2020) – Executive Producer
- Final Kill (2020) – Executive Producer
- Top of the Class (2020) – Executive Producer
- Money Plane (2020) – Executive Producer
