= Switzer Entertainment Group =

American independent film production and film finance company

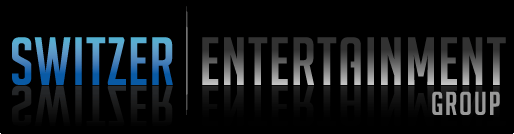
- Founded: 2013
- Headquarters: Los Angeles, California, United States
- Key people: Richard Switzer (CEO)

Switzer Entertainment Group is an American independent film production and film finance company founded by Richard Switzer and based in Los Angeles, California. SEG has an exclusive output deal with Taylor & Dodge for worldwide distribution. The company has produced films that have been distributed by Alchemy (company), Lifetime Movie Network, and NBC Universal, among others.

Every film produced by Switzer Entertainment Group have been licensed in major overseas territories and licensed on every platform in North America. SEG currently has multiple films in various stages of development.

== Films ==
- A Fatal Obsession (2014) - Production Company
- Buddy Hutchins (2014) - Production Company, Financing
- School's Out (2015) - Production Company, Financing
- Blue Line (2015) - Production Company, Financing
- Isolation (2015) - Gap financing
- Arlo: The Burping Pig (2016) - Production Company, Financing
- Altitude (2016) - Production Company, Financing
- Christmas All Over Again (2016) - Production Company, Financing
