= Mark S. Allen =

American television host and producer

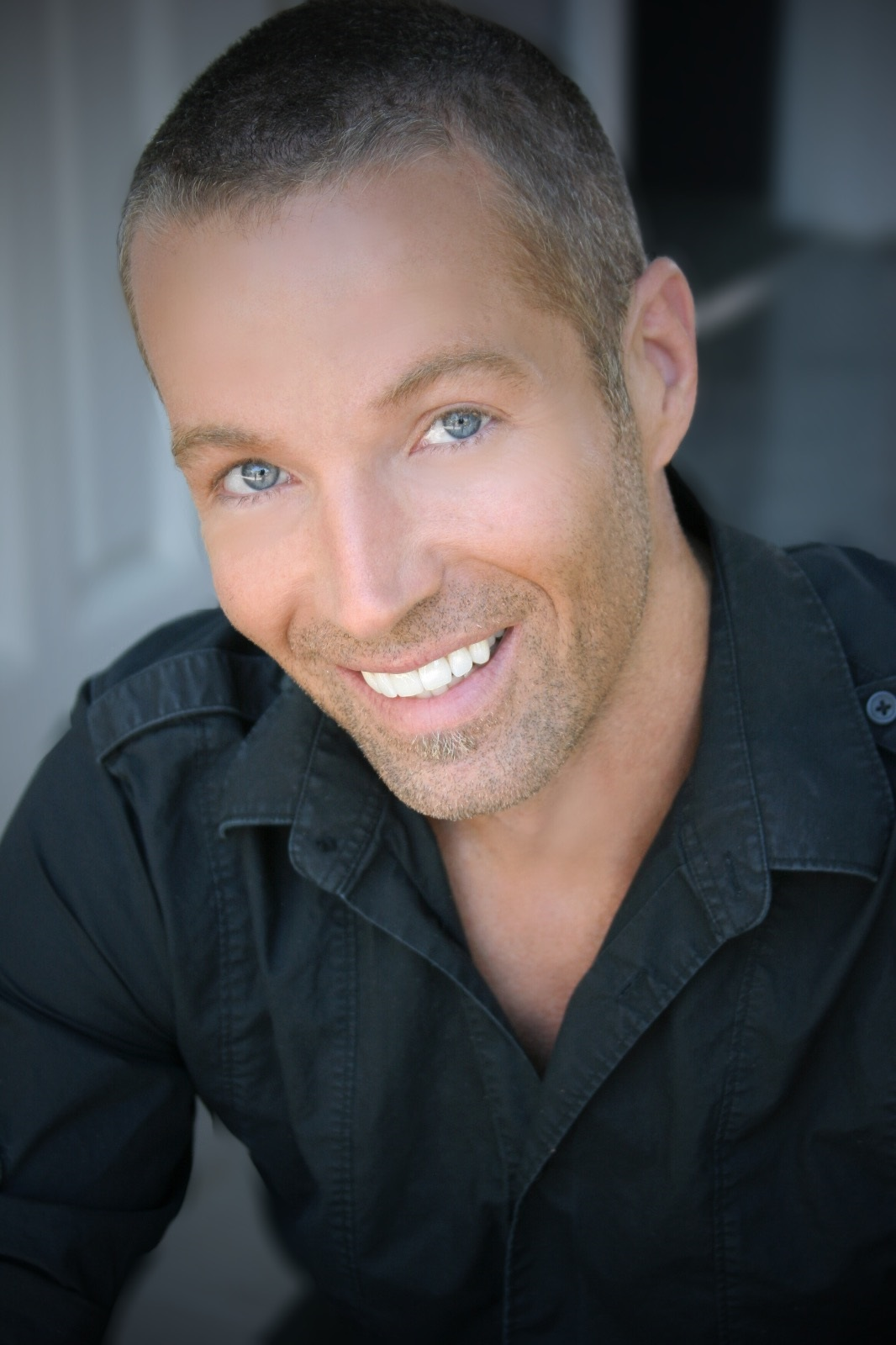
- Allen in 2010
- Born: Mark Allen Stell; 1964 or 1965 (age 61–62); Amarillo, Texas, U.S.
- Other name: Mark S. Allen
- Occupations: Movie Producer/Director TV Producer, host
- Years active: 1996–present
- Employer(s): Make The Movie, TEGNA
- Known for: Producer, writer, director: Movies, TV and Radio hosting and producing syndicated celebrity content.
- Height: 6 ft (183 cm)
- Children: 3
- Awards: Emmy Awards (7), “Best Dark Comedy” CANNES World Film Fest winner 2022

Mark S. Allen, a member of the Producers Guild Of America., is an American eight time Emmy Award-winning television producer/host; and, producer, writer, or director of multiple feature films including APParition with Mena Suvari and Kevin Pollak, Notorious Nick with Cody Christian and the FearPHarm franchise. He is the co-writer, co-director of the Eric Robert's thriller 616 Wilford Lane and director of the Cannes World Film Festival official selection and best dark comedy winner Amy's F- It List.

He is executive producer/host of the celebrity movie and streaming show “Take A Look,” and the Emmy Award-winning syndicated movie show Extra Butter TV and a cast member on ABC10 Morning news on KXTV in Sacramento. He was previously the host for of Comedy Central's award-winning series Short Attention Span Theater and the creator, producer and host of Mark at the Movies.

In 2018 he co-founded and continued to co-own The Smart Axe Co, the largest California based chain of World Axe League certified Axe bars.

He's the published author of 100 Things To Do Before You Die in Sacramento. (Reedy Press/Barnes and Noble).

== Professional background ==
=== Radio ===
Allen got his broadcasting start as a radio personality, in Dallas, Sacramento (at KSFM FM-102.5), and Southern California.

In 1988, to raise awareness and funds for the Muscular Dystrophy Association, Allen agreed to live 24 hours a day, seven days a week on a billboard for a month. On the third night of the stunt Allen fell off the billboard breaking bones in both legs and feet while also suffering a concussion. The day after he fell off the billboard, the local American River Fire Department rushed out and took him to the hospital. But after getting casts, he still insisted upon returning to the top to complete the fundraiser.

In 2011, he returned to radio in Sacramento on KZZO 100.5 FM.

=== Television ===
In 1991, Allen was one of the hosts of the youth oriented news program Scratch produced by then-CBS affiliate KXTV in Sacramento. He created and hosted a segment about teen romance called Dateless and Desperate. In 1993, Allen replaced comedians Jon Stewart and Patty Rosborough as host of the Comedy Central network show Short Attention Span Theater.

From 1996 to 2016 Allen was the entertainment anchor, film critic, stuntman, and arts and entertainment host on Good Day Sacramento on CBS O&O KOVR. On October 30, 2015, Allen swam from the new Bay Bridge nonstop to the Golden Gate Bridge on live TV, days after the first recorded shark attack in the history of the San Francisco Bay was recorded.

Allen appeared as a co-host with Chris O'Donnell on the Critics' Choice Awards 2008 Red Carpet Pre Show. In 2009, Allen created the movie review show Mark at the Movies. While it first aired locally, Reelz quickly acquired the rights and ran it until 2015. It won two Emmys in 2010 and a third in 2011. In 2017, he created the celebrity interview show Extra Butter TV which he hosts and produces, winning Emmy Awards in 2017 and 2019. Extra Butter TV ( now renamed Take A Look) is syndicated in 122 countries Worldwide on AFN..

Since 2016 he has been one of the cast members of The Morning Blend on KXTV, which had become an ABC affiliate in 1995.

=== Film ===
He is producer and co-writer of the 2019 feature film APParition starring Mena Suvari and Kevin Pollak. In 2020. he was a writer and producer on Ballbuster starring Jerry O’ Connell, Fear Pharm, and Fear PHarm 2. He is a producer of the 2021 film Notorious Nick, based on the true story of MMA champion Nick Newell starring Cody Christian and Elisabeth Rohm. 616 Wilford Lane, which Allen produced, co-wrote and co-directed, is in post-production as of April, 2021.

In 2017, he was named California Film Foundation Person of the Year.

Allen played an FBI Agent in Joe Carnahan's feature length debut Blood, Guts, Bullets and Octane. He appeared as a journalist in the 2016 film Independence Day: Resurgence. He also makes appearances in films he has produced.

== Personal life ==
Allen has three children.

In 2016, his book 100 Things to do in Sacramento Before You Die was published on Reedy Press in their 100 Things series, and volume two was released in 2021.

He has a Guinness World Record for jalapeño pepper eating. He has been Mark Zuckerberg's guest at the Facebook campus on numerous occasions to host celebrity movie screening Q&As. He has also hosted screenings for two California governors.

In 2017 he was awarded the Children's Miracle Network "Person Of The Year" award for his ongoing efforts to raise funds for children's hospitals.

== Controversies ==
=== Drunk driving arrests ===
In late 2006, Sacramento County sheriff's deputies pulled Allen over near the Sacramento International Airport, where he was eventually arrested for driving while under the influence. He was suspended from KMAX-TV and did not appear on "Good Day Sacramento" while the case proceed its way through the court system. He entered a guilty plea to a single misdemeanor count of DUI, served three years on probation and performed community service as part of his sentence. The station re-instated him a short time later. He later addressed the arrest during a "Good Day Sacramento" broadcast, noting that he had been dining with friends and believed he was sober enough to drive home.

In December 2015, Allen was charged with another DUI offense. According to police, Allen was discovered parked on a side street in historic Roseville, CA He was booked into the Placer County Jail on DUI-related charges. KMAX did not issue a statement about Allen's arrest until the Sacramento News & Reviews newspaper published a story about the incident. He resigned from KMAX-TV the following March after agreeing to plead no contest to DUI. He paid several thousand dollars in fines and attended mandatory alcohol addiction treatment classes.

Each year in the anniversary of his arrest, he does a live televised ride along with his arresting officer to promote sober driving.
