= Lovecraft (Gotham) =

- Gotham episode
- Episode no.: Season 1 Episode 10
- Directed by: Guy Ferland
- Written by: Rebecca Dameron
- Production code: 4X6660
- Original air date: November 24, 2014

Guest appearances
- Nicholas D'Agosto as Harvey Dent; Richard Kind as Mayor Aubrey James; Drew Powell as Butch Gilzean; Makenzie Leigh as Liza; Al Sapienza as Dick Lovecraft; Clare Foley as Ivy Pepper; Lesley-Ann Brandt as Larissa Diaz; Devin Harjes as Clyde; Kyle Massey as Mackey; John Ennos III as Saviano; Frank Liotti as Turski

Episode chronology
← Previous "Harvey Dent"	Next → "Rogues' Gallery"

"Lovecraft" is the tenth episode and mid-season finale of the television series Gotham. It premiered on FOX on November 24, 2014 and was written by Rebecca Dameron, and directed by Guy Ferland. In this episode, Wayne Manor is attacked, forcing Bruce (David Mazouz) and Selina (Camren Bicondova) to flee, while Gordon (Ben McKenzie) comes closer to Lovecraft (Al Sapienza).

The episode was watched by 6.05 million viewers and received generally positive reviews with critics commenting on the ending and Bruce's and Selina's storyline. The episode received an Emmy nomination for Outstanding Special Visual Effects in a Supporting Roles.

== Plot ==
A group of assassins, led by Larissa Diaz (Lesley-Ann Brandt), break into Wayne Manor, looking for Bruce (David Mazouz) and Selina (Camren Bicondova). They escape after Alfred (Sean Pertwee) fights with the assassins. Oswald Cobblepot (Robin Lord Taylor) reunites with Carmine Falcone (John Doman), who wants to know how Maroni knew his money was stored at the armory, thinking Cobblepot double-crossed him. Cobblepot tries to tell him there is a mole in his crew.

Harvey Dent (Nicholas D'Agosto) begins to suspect Lovecraft (Al Sapienza) is responsible for the assassins. During a mob dinner with Fish Mooney (Jada Pinkett Smith) and other mobsters, Falcone kills Irish mob boss Bannion for not guarding the money and states their tribute rates will increase 25% to recover from the money lost in the armory. Bruce and Selina arrive at an underground base with some kids. They decide to go a place called the Narrows, where a fence, Clyde (Devin Harjes) will pay them. Harvey Bullock (Donal Logue) receives the information from Mooney about the Narrows.

Gordon finds Lovecraft in his apartment, denying any involvement and claiming the assassins are after him too. The assassins arrive and knock out Gordon. When he wakes up, he finds Lovecraft dead in his bathtub with a bullet to the head, fired with Gordon's gun. Bruce and Selina arrive with Clyde, where Selina offers some things she stole from Wayne Manor. Clyde offers less than expected and locks them in a warehouse. The assassins arrive, looking for Selina but they escape through some tools in the warehouse. The GCPD arrives and a shootout ensues. Bruce manages to distract Copperhead so Selina can escape. Later Selina visits Bruce and kisses him.

In the GCPD, Mayor Aubrey James (Richard Kind) chastises Gordon and Dent. He believes Lovecraft went crazy after Gordon questioned him, took his gun and committed suicide. After announcing Lovecraft's "suicide", James reassigns Gordon to guard duty at Arkham Asylum.

== Reception ==
=== Viewers ===
The episode was watched by 6.05 million viewers, with a 2.3 rating among 18-49 adults. With Live+7 DVR viewing factored in, the episode had an overall rating of 9.61 million viewers, and a 3.8 in the 18–49 demographic.

=== Critical reviews ===
Professional ratings
Review scores
Source	Rating
Rotten Tomatoes (Tomatometer)	75%
Rotten Tomatoes (Average Score)	5.0
IGN	7.4
The A.V. Club	C+
GamesRadar	4.5/5 stars
Paste Magazine	7.0
TV Fanatic	3.6/5 stars
Vulture	3/5 stars

"Lovecraft" received generally positive reviews. The episode received a rating of 75% with an average score of 5.0 out of 10 on the review aggregator Rotten Tomatoes, with the site's consensus stating: "While 'Lovecraft' struggles with the balance of campy thrills and deliberate plotting, Alfred and Wayne's characters elevate Gotham to Batman-worthy heights."

Matt Fowler of IGN gave the episode a "good" 7.4 out of 10 and wrote in his verdict, "With "Lovecraft," Gotham chose to take us out of the midseason with a focus on the Bruce/Alfred relationship, letting the Gordon/Bullock partnership that seemed to take a turn in 'Penguin's Umbrella' and 'The Mask' fizzle out. There was a lot of action, and it was cool to watch Alfred get super violent, but it still remains very difficult to make anything on this series feel like something other than filler for a future Batman story."

The A.V. Club's Kyle Fowle gave the episode a "C+" grade and wrote, "22 episodes is a lot of television. It's a lot of television to create, especially when you originally planned a story that spanned 16 episodes. Gotham executive producer Danny Cannon acknowledged as much in an interview posted online today. He talks about needing to stretch the story out, to spend more time with characters and emotions rather than rushing to a massive climax. In theory, that all sounds great–this is a show that could use a little deliberation from time to time–but if 'Lovecraft,' the midseason finale, is any indication of what a stretched out story looks like on Gotham, then we’re in for a tedious back-half of the show’s first season."
