= All Star Weekend =

All Star Weekend may refer to:

- Allstar Weekend, American pop rock band
- NBA All-Star Weekend, American weekend basketball festival
- NBB All Star Weekend, Brazilian weekend basketball festival
- Philippine Basketball Association All-Star Weekend, Philippine basketball festival
- All-Star Weekend (film), an upcoming film directed and written by Jamie Foxx
