= Harvey Dent (disambiguation) =

Harvey Dent is the birth name of Two-Face, a fictional character.

Harvey Dent may also refer to:

- Harvey Dent (1989 film series character)
- "Harvey Dent" (Gotham episode)
