= Notorious Nick =

- Directed by: Aaron Leong
- Written by: Josh Campbell; Matt Stuecken; Darrin Reed
- Produced by: Mark S. Allen; Howard Burd
- Starring: Cody Christian; Elisabeth Röhm; Barry Livingston; Kevin Pollak
- Cinematography: Brian Hamm
- Edited by: Ian Webb
- Music by: Jeffery Alan Jones; Ben Worley
- Distributed by: Lionsgate
- Release date: August 7, 2021
- Running time: 1hr 30min
- Country: United States
- Language: English

Notorious Nick is the 2021 biopic that tells the true story of Nick Newell, a wrestler who born without his left arm, and who won the 2012 Xtreme Fighting Championship (XFC). The film stars Cody Christian as Nick Newell and Elisabeth Röhm as Nick's mother, Stacey Newell.
