= Al Sapienza =

American actor (born 1962)

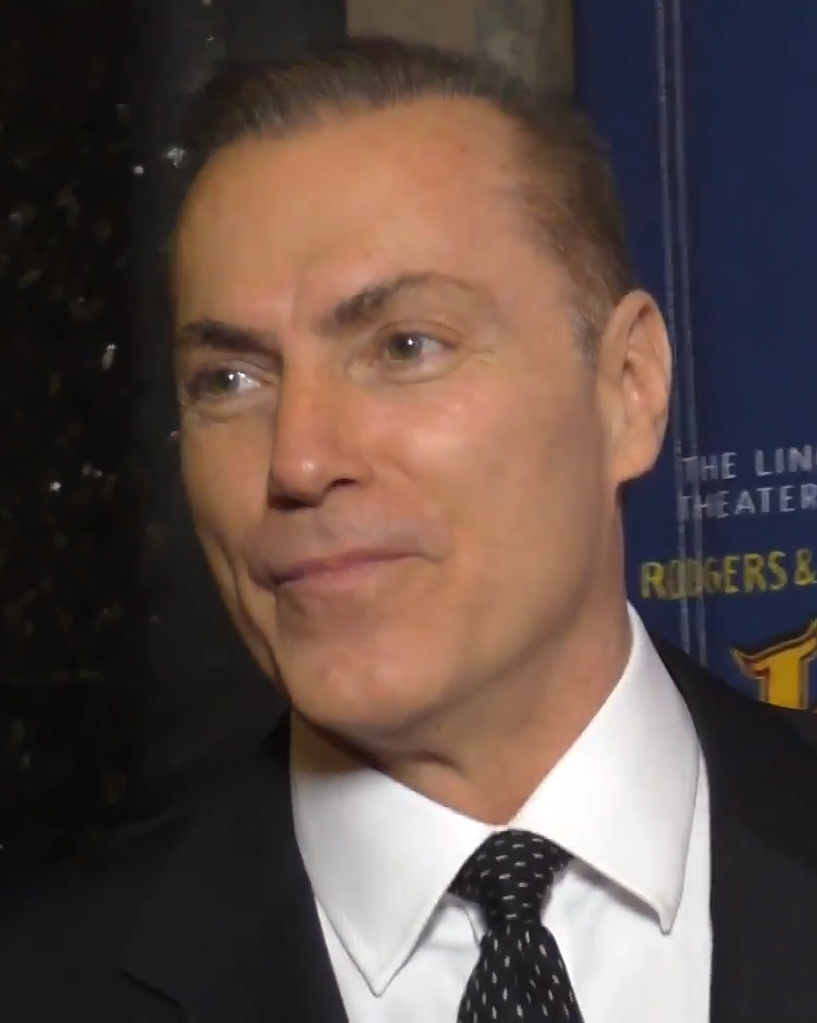
- Sapienza in 2016
- Born: July 31, 1962 (age 64); New York City, New York, U.S.
- Other name: Alex Statler
- Occupation: Actor
- Years active: 1979–present

Al Sapienza (born July 31, 1962) is an American actor who has had numerous roles in television, stage and film productions. He is best known for his role as Mikey Palmice on the HBO series The Sopranos as well as for his role as Marty Spinella, a lobbyist for the teachers' union in the Netflix series House of Cards. He played the role of Jake Housman in the North American premiere of the stage version of Dirty Dancing.

== Filmography ==
=== Film ===
Year	Film	Role	Notes
1979	Nocturna: Granddaughter of Dracula	Musician	
1990	Pretty Woman	Night Doorman	credited as Alex Statler
1991	Frankie and Johnny	Peter's roommate	
1993	Champagne and Bullets	Drug smuggler	
1993	CIA II: Target Alexa	Raines	credited as Alex Statler
1994	Animal Instincts 2	Eric	Video
1995	Under Siege 2: Dark Territory	Captain no. 2	
1995	Free Willy 2: The Adventure Home	Engineer	
1995	Judge Dredd	Unnamed Judge (Uncredited)	
1997	The Voyeur	James	
1997	Beyond Belief: Fact or Fiction	John	
1998	Godzilla	Taxi driver	
1998	Lethal Weapon 4	Detective	
1998	Phoenix	Cop	
2001	The Hollywood Sign	Rodney	
2002	Al's Lads	Georgio	Alternate title - Capone's Boys
2002	Rabbit	Frank	Short film
2002	Blind Heat	Jeffrey Scott	
2003	Bomb the System	Officer Bobby Cox	
2003	Endangered Species	Medina	
2004	Starkweather	Deputy Fahrnbruch	
2004	Cellular	Ed	
2004	Sin's Kitchen	Joe	Also associate producer
2004	Megalodon	Ross Elliot	
2004	Redemption	Daniel Stanza	
2005	Waterborne	Connors	
2005	Central Booking	Marty Johnson	
2005	Back in the Day	Detective Kline	Voiceover
2005	Devil's Highway	Hector	
2005	Carlito's Way: Rise to Power	Nick	Video, uncredited
2006	Intellectual Property	Paul's father	
2007	Scar	Delgado	
2008	Saw V	Chief of Police	
2008	Crazy Girls Undercover	Alex Walker	
2009	Dolan's Cadillac	Fletcher	
2010	Unrivaled	Sergio	
2010	Vacation with Derek	Doug Dumbarton	Television film
2011	Secrets from Her Past	David	
2011	Margin Call	Louis Carmelo	
2012	A Dark Truth	Doug Calder	
2012	Girls Gone Dead	Sheriff Pratt	
2012	Jersey Shore Shark Attack	Mike	
2013	Please Kill Mr. Know It All	Mob Boss	
2013	Separation	Elliot	
2013	Seasick Sailor	Lou	Short film
2014	Late Phases	Bennett	
2014	Million Dollar Arm	Pete the Scout	
2014	Godzilla	Huddleston	
2014	Omphalos	Darius Lefaux	
2014	Taken 3	Detective Johnson	
2015	The Big Short	Forum Speaker	
2016	Stevie D	Nick Grimaldi	
2017	XXX: Return of Xander Cage	CIA Director	
2017	Shock and Awe	Arthur	
2017	Gangster Land	Johnny Torrio	
2018	Black Water	Edward Rhodes	
2018	Damn You, Roland Ruby!	Big Ricky Parisi	
2019	American Hangman	Detective Steptoe	
2019	The Art of Racing in the Rain	Luca Pantoni	
2019	From Zero to I Love You	Tracey Thayer	
2020	Capone	Ralphie	
2020	Money Plane	The Bookkeeper	
2021	Dark Web: Cicada 3301	Mike Croft	
2023	Big George Foreman	Gil Clancy	
2026	Unholy Night	Uncle Bruno	

=== Television ===
Year	Title	Role	Notes
1990	Who's the Boss?	Tomato Man	Season 7 Episode 11: "Inherit the Wine"
1995	NYPD Blue	Tommy	Season 2 Episode 12: "Large Mouth Bass"
1996	Hot Line	Nick Garvey	Season 2 Episode 9: "Double Exposure"
1997–2002	JAG	(1) Petty Officer Ralph Carlos (2) Major Satelino	(1) Season 2 Episode 15: "Rendezvous" (2) Season 8 Episode 3: "Family Business"
1999	Law & Order	Scott Shea	Season 9 Episode 16: "Harm"
1999–2004	The Sopranos	Mikey Palmice	10 episodes
2000	NYPD Blue	Pete Mangrini	Season 7 Episode 17: "Roll Out the Barrel"
2000	Judging Amy	Greg Christofaro	Season 1 Episode 19: "The Out-of-Towners"
2002–2003	24	Paul Koplin	(1) Season 2 Episode 7: "Day 2: 2:00 p.m.-3:00 p.m." (2002) (2) Season 2 Episode 8: "Day 2: 3:00 p.m.-4:00 p.m." (2002) (3) Season 2 Episode 9: "Day 2: 4:00 p.m.-5:00 p.m." (2003)
2003	CSI: Miami	James Fukes	Season 1 Episode 19: "Double Cap"
2003	Living Straight	Adam Parks	TV movie
2004	Charmed	Johnny the Gent	Season 7 Episode 8: "Charmed Noir"
2004	Alias	Tom	Season 3 Episode 2: "Succession"
2004	The O.C.	Luna Chicks Club Owner	Season 1 Episode 22: "The L.A."
2004–2024	NCIS	(1) Commander William Foley (2) De Leon's Lawyer (3) Maurice Riva	(1) Season 1 Episode 18: "UnSEALed" (2004) (2) Season 20 Episode 22: "Black Sky" (2023) (3) Season 21 Episode 1: "Algùn Día" (2024)
2005	Law & Order	Pete Andretti	Season 15 Episode 13: "Ain't No Love"
2005	Prison Break	Philly Falzone	(1) Season 1 Episode 2: "Allen" (2) Season 1 Episode 3: "Cell Test" (3) Season 1 Episode 9: "Tweener" (4) Season 1 Episode 10: "Sleight of Hand"
2006	Law & Order: Criminal Intent	Seamus Flaherty's Attorney	Season 6 Episode 7: "Country Crossover"
2006	The Path to 9/11	Donald Sadowy	(1) Season 1 Episode 1 (2) Season 1 Episode 2
2006–2008	Brotherhood	Mayor Frank Panzerelli	11 episodes
2007	Til Lies Do Us Part	Ethan	TV movie
2008	In Plain Sight	Frank Santoro Sr. / Francis Amato	Season 1 Episode 1: "Pilot"
2009	Fringe	Conrad Moreau	Season 1 Episode 13: "The Transformation"
2009	Dark Blue		Season 1 Episode 3: "Purity"
2009	Warehouse 13	Captain Powell	Season 1 Episode 6: "Burnout"
2010	Burn Notice	Special Agent Callahan	Season 3 Episode 16: "Devil You Know"
2011	White Collar	Frank DeLuca, Jr.	Season 3 Episode 4: "Dentist of Detroit"
2011	Law & Order: Special Victims Unit	ATF Supervisor	Season 12 Episode 24: "Smoked"
2011–2012	Blue Bloods	Phil Sanfino	(1) Season 2 Episode 5: "A Night on the Town" (2011) (2) Season 2 Episode 16: "Women with Guns" (2012) (3) Season 2 Episode 21: Collateral Damage" (2012)
2011–2015	Person of Interest	Detective Raymond Terney	14 episodes
2013	House of Cards	Marty Spinella	(1) Season 1 Episode 3: "Chapter 3" (2) Season 1 Episode 5: "Chapter 5" (3) Season 1 Episode 6: "Chapter 6"
2013	Arrow	Edward Rasmus	Season 1 Episode 20: "Home Invasion"
2014	The Flash	Detective Fred Chyre	Season 1 Episode 1: "Pilot"
2014	Gotham	Dick Lovecraft	(1) Season 1 Episode 9: "Harvey Dent" (2) Season 1 Episode 10: "Lovecraft"
2014	Ascension	Councilman Rose	(1) Season 1 Episode 1: "Chapter One" (2) Season 1 Episode 2: "Chapter Two" (3) Season 1 Episode 3: "Chapter Three"
2015	Jesse Stone: Lost in Paradise	Mr. Davies	Television film
2015	Public Morals	Harry Hardware	Season 1 Episode 2: "Family Is Family"
2016	Game of Silence	Wallace Tuttle	(1) Season 1 Episode 3: "Hurricane Gil" (2) Season 1 Episode 4: "The Uninvited" (3) Season 1 Episode 5: "Ghosts of Quitman" (4) Season 1 Episode 6: "Into the Black" (5) Season 1 Episode 9: "The Truth" (6) Season 1 Episode 10: "She Sang Hymns Out of Tune"
2016	Shoot the Messenger	Erik Lawson	8 episodes
2016	Elementary	Sergeant Black	Season 4 Episode 17: "You've Got Me, Who's Got You?"
2016–2017	The Peter Austin Noto Show	Self at Sid's pants/sids pants Himself	(1) Season 3 Episode 25: "Al Sapienza" (2016) (2) Season 5 Episode 3 (2016) (3) Season 5 Episode 4 (2016) (4) Season 5 Episode 9 (2017)
2017	Shades of Blue	Kirschner	(1) Season 2 Episode 11: "The Quality of Mercy" (2) Season 2 Episode 12: "Behind the Mask"
2017	Rogue	SAC Mullen	(1) Season 4 Episode 9: "The Third Man" (2) Season 4 Episode 10: "A Good Leaving Alone"
2017–2019	Suits	Thomas Bratton	(1) Season 7 Episode 4: "Divide and Conquer" (2017) (2) Season 7 Episode 7: "Full Disclosure" (2017) (3) Season 7 Episode 8: "100" (2017) (4) Season 8 Episode 9: "Motion to Delay" (2018) (5) Season 9 Episode 4: "Cairo" (2019)
2018	No Easy Days	Andrew Whitmore	8 episodes
2018	Insomnia	Eric Ford	8 episodes
2018	Tom Clancy's Jack Ryan	Lieutenant General Marcus Trent	(1) Season 1 Episode 5: "End of Honor" (2) Season 1 Episode 7: "The Boy" (3) Season 1 Episode 8: "Inshallah"
2018	Supernatural	Santino Scarpatti	Season 13 Episode 15: "A Most Holy Man"
2019	God Friended Me	Sonny	Season 1 Episode 16: "Scenes from an Italian Restaurant"
2019	The Blacklist	Carlo Androssani	Season 6 Episode 16: "Lady Luck (Number 69)"
2019	Designated Survivor	General Nathan Kellogg	Season 3 Episode 7: "#identity/crisis"
2019	Pure	Sterling Mackay	(1) Season 2 Episode 1: "Excommunication" (2) Season 2 Episode 2: "Faspa" (3) Season 2 Episode 5: "Penance"
2019	Hudson & Rex	Edward Bullock	(1) Season 1 Episode 8: "Fast Eddie's, Slow Food" (2) Season 1 Episode 11: "Bad Water Rising"
2021	Queen of the South	Mr. Shaker	Season 5 Episode 6: "Plata o Plomo"
2021	Dopesick	Paul Hanly	Season 1 Episode 5: "The Whistleblower"
2021	Deck the Heart	Artie Stein	Television film
2023–2024	Reacher	Drew Marsh	(1) Season 2 Episode 4: "A Night at the Symphony" (2023) (2) Season 2 Episode 6: "New York's Finest" (2024) (3) Season 2 Episode 7: "The Man Goes Through" (2024)
2024	The Umbrella Academy	Richard/Dick	Season 4 Episode 4: "The Cleanse"
2026	The Body	Bishop Charles Felton	(1) Season 1 Episode 4: "I saw Grace Franklin with the Devil" (2) Season 1 Episode 7: "Holy Trinity" (3) Season 1 Episode 8: "Coming Out"

=== Video games ===
Year	Title	Role
1996	Soviet Strike	Nick Arnold
2005	Law & Order: Criminal Intent	E.G. Halliwell
2008	Grand Theft Auto IV	The Crowd of Liberty City
