= Jasmine Waltz =

American model, actress and reality TV personality (born 1982)

- Born: Jasmine Lynne Waltz; August 22, 1982 (age 44); Las Vegas, Nevada, U.S.
- Other name: Jas
- Citizenship: American
- Occupations: Actress; producer; writer; model; TV personality
- Years active: 2003–present

Jasmine Waltz (born August 22, 1982) is an American model, actress, and reality television personality from Las Vegas, Nevada.

== Career ==
Waltz began modeling while studying at the University of Performing Arts, and appeared in commercials and the televisions sitcom Rules of Engagement.

Waltz had minor roles in films and television shows such as Femme Fatales, Secret Girlfriend, and the film Black Water. She was a contestant in Celebrity Big Brother 13 in 2014 and Celebrity Big Brother 19 in 2017, being evicted on Day 13, in both series. In May 2016, she joined the cast of the series Blade of Honor, as the character H.A.V.I.

== Filmography ==
=== Film ===
| Year | Title | Role | Notes |
|---|---|---|---|
| 2003 | Bad Boys II | Video Store Customer | |
| 2006 | National Lampoon's TV: The Movie | Bunny | |
| 2006 | National Lampoon's Pledge This! | Smoking Girl #3 | |
| 2008 | Sides | Gwen | |
| 2009 | Poker Run | Cheri Shaw | |
| 2011 | Love | Robot Wife | |
| 2011 | Cheerleader Massacre 2 | Kelly | Video |
| 2012 | Lost Angeles | Meg | |
| 2013 | Demon | Agent Nicole Diaz | |
| 2014 | Murder 101 | Detective Brown | |
| 2014 | Live Nude Girls | Deeva | |
| 2015 | Joe Dirt 2: Beautiful Loser | Boxcar Woman | |
| 2017 | Robots About Robots | - | Short |
| 2018 | Black Water | Cassie Taylor | |
| 2020 | Loss of Grace | Cathy | |
| 2021 | 616 Wilford Lane | Austyn | |
| 2022 | House Red | Sophie | |
| TBA | All-Star Weekend | Josephine | Completed |

=== Television ===
| Year | Title | Role | Notes |
|---|---|---|---|
| 2008 | Dirt | Girlfriend | Recurring Cast: Season 2 |
| 2008 | Buzzin' | Jasmine | Episode: "Unhappy Birthday" |
| 2008 | Luke 11:17 | Kylie | Recurring Cast |
| 2009 | Burning Hollywood | Handy Mandy | Episode: "Lucky Town" |
| 2009 | Rules of Engagement | Jenny | Episode: "Twice" |
| 2009 | Secret Girlfriend | Erin | Recurring Cast |
| 2010 | Warren the Ape | Nurse | Episode: "Out with the Old" |
| 2011 | Femme Fatales | Tara | Episode: "Visions: Part 1 & 2" |
