= The Starving Games =

2013 American parody film

- Theatrical release poster
- Directed by: Jason Friedberg; Aaron Seltzer
- Written by: Jason Friedberg; Aaron Seltzer
- Produced by: Peter Safran; Jason Friedberg; Aaron Seltzer
- Starring: Maiara Walsh; Cody Christian; Brant Daugherty; Lauren Bowles; Diedrich Bader
- Cinematography: Shawn Maurer
- Edited by: Peck Prior
- Music by: Timothy Michael Wynn
- Production company: The Safran Company
- Distributed by: Ketchup Entertainment
- Release date: November 8, 2013
- Running time: 82 minutes
- Country: United States
- Language: English
- Budget: $4.9 million
- Box office: $3.8 million

The Starving Games is a 2013 American independent parody film written and directed by Jason Friedberg and Aaron Seltzer and produced by Peter Safran, Friedberg & Seltzer. The film parodies The Hunger Games and it stars Maiara Walsh, Cody Christian, Brant Daugherty, Lauren Bowles and Diedrich Bader. It is the first film in Friedberg and Seltzer's long-running partnership to be distributed independently. It was released simultaneously in theaters and video on demand by distribution start-up Ketchup Entertainment. The film was released on November 8, 2013 to negative reviews.

== Plot ==
Kantmiss Evershot practices archery in the forest, but her boyfriend, Dale, surprises her; the arrow accidentally hits The Wizard of Oz. They return to District 12, where children afraid of getting picked for the Games deliberately injure and mutilate themselves to avoid selection. Harry, Ron, and Hermione are seen being forcibly removed from District 12. Kantmiss gives her younger sister, Petunia, a golden pin with a "courageous bird" that will help keep her safe. The pin turns out to be a chicken, and Petunia then injures herself with it and crashes into a house. At the Gathering for the 75th Annual Starving Games, President Snowballs explains his reason for separating America into districts and lists ridiculous prizes for winning, including a half-eaten pickle. During the drawing for District 12's contestants, the hostess draws several gag names ("Hugh Janus", "Phil Mahooters", and "Dean Gulberry") to no avail. Petunia has her name drawn, but manipulates Kantmiss into volunteering by crying fake tears, so she can eat Kantmiss' pet hamster if she doesn't return. Dale also tries volunteering, but the town idiot, Peter Malarkey, does so first. Kantmiss and Peter are taken to the Capitol, where they attend a televised interview in front of a live audience. Kantmiss wears a dress that catches on fire and burns her when she spins in it during her interview. Peter reveals in his interview that he has a crush on Marco, a fellow contestant.

When the Games begin, Kantmiss grabs a backpack but must fight a fellow contestant for it. After being fatally struck by two knives and sawed in half with a weed whacker, the remaining half of this contestant eventually relinquishes the backpack before dying. Kantmiss tries fleeing, but Seleca, the Games' producer, sends Angry Birds to attack her; she defeats them and squashes the Annoying Orange in a Fruit Ninja parody. Peter teams up with a group of contestants led by Marco, who aim to kill Kantmiss. After discovering them, Kantmiss fails to climb a tree, only to find a ladder. Marco tries to kill her with a spear, but it kills one of his allies instead. While sitting in the tree, Kantmiss gets her face covered in bird poo after whistling to the birds. Marco and his allies flee when she attempts to make a beehive fall on them, cutting it loose using a chainsaw. Instead, the beehive falls on her head and she gets severely stung. The venom causes her to hallucinate a quadruple rainbow and a Na'vi. She is slapped back to her senses by fellow contestant Rudy; they team up, vowing to kill the other contestants first. After Kantmiss and Rudy discuss their plan, Marco and his group reveal they were eavesdropping the whole time (in plain sight, a few feet away), and Kantmiss and Rudy flee. Marco and his allies corner Kantmiss, who quickly dispatches everyone except him. He pulls a knife on her, at which point a referee intervenes and begins the halftime show. After the halftime show is played, Marco again tries to kill Kantmiss, but Rudy kicks his shin. Marco then kills Rudy by drop-kicking her into a tree.

Wanting to spice up the Games, Snowballs implements a lesbian love story, but learns Kantmiss is the only woman left; thus, only a straight romance is possible. After it is announced that only a couple can win the games, Kantmiss tries to team up with Marco over Peter, but Seleca fakes being killed to convince her to find Peter instead. Kantmiss kills all contestants except Marco and Peter, and flees with the latter to a cave. As Peter starts to have a fever, he reveals that he has been stalking Kantmiss for most of her life. Since Kantmiss keeps her distance from Peter, Seleca offers to send medical supplies to treat Peter if she gets more intimate with him. While becoming intimate, Gandalf and two dwarves appear in a Lord of the Rings parody, claiming to be drawn to the cave by the sound of incessant moaning. Kantmiss demands they leave, and they oblige. Kantmiss has (censored) sex with Peter, which is televised. This disgusts Dale, who storms the Starving Games arena, expressing his hatred for Peter.

The next day, Kantmiss and Peter attack Marco, but Snowballs orders Seleca to send in the Expendables. An armed Dale arrives, kills them, and asks Kantmiss to come back with him. When Kantmiss orders him to leave, he breaks up with her by changing his Facebook status to single. Marco holds Peter hostage, but Kantmiss shoots a loaf of bread into his eye, killing him. Seleca then announces that there can only be one winner again. Peter tries convincing Kantmiss to commit suicide with him by ingesting poisonous berries, to deny those in charge the satisfaction of them fighting to the death. Instead, Kantmiss kills Peter with an arrow, telling him, “Shit ain’t personal.” Afterwards, Nick Fury and the Avengers show up, with Fury saying he wants Kantmiss to join the Avengers team as a replacement for Hawkeye. Then the Avengers all die after stepping off their platforms and onto mines.

== Parodies ==
=== Films ===
- The Hunger Games (2012) (main parody)
- Avatar (2009)
- The Avengers (2012)
- Oz the Great and Powerful (2013)
- Harry Potter franchise (2001–2011)
- The Hobbit franchise (2012–2014)
- The Expendables (2010)
- Sherlock Holmes (2009)

=== Real life people ===
- LMFAO
- Taylor Swift
- Psy
- Tim Tebow
- Lady Gaga

=== Games ===
- Angry Birds
- Fruit Ninja

=== Web series ===
- Annoying Orange

== Cast ==
- Maiara Walsh as Kantmiss Evershot
- Cody Christian as Peter Malarkey
- Brant Daugherty as Dale
- Diedrich Bader as President Snowballs
- Lauren Bowles as Effoff
- Chris Marroy as Stanley Ceaserman
- Theodus Crane as Cleaver Williams
- Nick Gomez as Na'vi Guy
- Kennedy Hermansen as Petunia Evershot
- Rob Steinberg as Gandalf
- Aaron Jay Rome as Oz
- Matthew Graham Wagner as Harry Potter
- Kyle de Kay as Ron Weasley
- Sarah Reid Vinyard as Hermione
- Jade Roberts as Sylvester Stallone
- Joseph Aviel as Arnold Schwarzenegger
- Eric Buarque as Bruce Willis
- Gene Williams as Chuck Norris
- Jason Stanly as Jason Statham
- Gralen Bryant Banks as Nick Fury
- Jordan Salloum as Hawkeye
- Trenton Rostedt as Thor
- Ian Casselberry as SkyBlu
- Shawn Carter Peterson as Redfoo
- Gabby Gremillion as Taylor Swift
- Bryan McClure as Annoying Orange

== Box office performance ==
The film grossed $3,889,688 in the international markets.

== Reception ==
The Starving Games received overwhelmingly negative reviews. Review aggregation website Rotten Tomatoes gives the film an approval rating of 0% based on 9 reviews, with an average score of 1.60/10.

Joe Leydon of Variety called it a "stillborn spoof" and "desperately unfunny".

Scott Foy of Dread Central rated it 1.5 out of 5 stars and wrote that "[t]he printed word cannot fully express my dismay at having experienced this latest alleged comedy."

Gabe Torio of Indiewire wrote that the film "is as terrible as you think it is".

Max Nicholson of IGN called it "a horrible, horrible piece of cinema that needn't be watched by any person ever".

Fred Topel of CraveOnline rated it 1.5 out of 10 and called it "more of the same, only worse".

== See also ==
- The Hungover Games
- The Hunger Pains
