= 616 Wilford Lane =

2021 horror film directed by Mark S. Allen & Dante Yore

- Official release poster
- Directed by: Mark S. Allen; Dante Yore
- Written by: Howard Burd; Dante Yore; Mark S. Allen
- Produced by: Mark S. Allen; Howard Burd; Adam Dalton; Mark Decarlo; Rich Hoffman; Jeffery Alan Jones; Wendy McFarland
- Starring: John Littlefield; Eric Roberts; Alyson Gorske; Jessica Chancellor
- Cinematography: Dante Yore
- Edited by: Dante Yore
- Music by: Jeffery Alan Jones
- Production company: Make The Movie
- Distributed by: Indican Pictures; Magnolia Pictures
- Release date: May 18, 2021
- Running time: 85 minutes
- Country: United States
- Language: English

616 Wilford Lane is a 2021 horror film written and directed by Mark S. Allen and Dante Yore. It stars John Littlefield, Eric Roberts, Alyson Gorske, and Jessica Chancellor. The film is about a widower who relocates his two teen daughters to a charming town, and into their dream home, which quickly becomes a nightmare.

== Plot ==
A man, deeply troubled and sleepwalking, commits a gruesome murder-suicide in a large, isolated mansion. In his sleepwalking state, he methodically kills his wife and two children before taking his own life.

Years later, Jim Van Patten, a widower struggling to cope with the loss of his wife, decides to move with his two teenage daughters, Randy and Staci, to this very mansion on Wilford Lane, hoping to start fresh. From the moment they arrive, unsettling things begin happening doors creak open by themselves, shadows flicker in the corners of rooms, and strange noises echo through the empty halls.

As the family tries to settle in, Staci, the younger daughter, starts acting increasingly strange. She becomes withdrawn and exhibits odd behavior. Randy, the older sister, is skeptical but protective, sensing something deeply wrong in the house.

It looked like the younger daughter Staci was about to reenact the murders, but it turned out none of them were related and were actually a crime syndicate. The syndicate staged all of the supernatural incidents that they conveniently caught on camera and threatened to sue the town and realtor and got a million dollar payout settlement. It was revealed in a flashback that the mother figure of the syndicate told Staci to kill the others. She did and took all the money and drove off into the sunset in a convertible.

== Cast ==
- John Littlefield as Jim
- Eric Roberts as David
- Alyson Gorske as Staci
- Stevonte Fitzgerald Hart as Miles
- Eliza Roberts as Joan
- Jasmine Waltz as Austyn
- Jessica Chancellor as Randy
- John Michael Herrmann as Matt
- Nadine Stenovitch as Robin
- Don Scribner as Sheriff
- Rich Vogt as Deputy Boyle
- Mark DeCarlo as Micheal

== Release ==
The film was released in the United States on May 18, 2021.
