= Black Water (2018 film) =

2018 American action thriller film directed by Pasha Patriki

- Theatrical release poster
- Directed by: Pasha Patriki
- Written by: Chad Law
- Produced by: Richard Switzer; Jason Cherubini; Tyler Konney; Alexander Ferguson
- Starring: Jean-Claude Van Damme; Dolph Lundgren; Patrick Kilpatrick; Courtney B. Turk; Jasmine Waltz; Al Sapienza
- Cinematography: Pasha Patriki
- Music by: Spencer Creaghan
- Production companies: Taylor & Dodge; Dawn's Light
- Distributed by: Saban Films
- Release date: May 25, 2018
- Running time: 104 minutes
- Country: United States
- Language: English
- Budget: $5 million
- Box office: $7.9 million

Black Water is an American action thriller film directed by Pasha Patriki. It stars Jean-Claude Van Damme and Dolph Lundgren in their fifth collaboration, specifically the second time they appear as on-screen allies. The film was released direct-to-video in the US on May 25, 2018.

== Plot ==
Scott Wheeler (Jean-Claude Van Damme), a deep cover operative awakens along with another prisoner, Marco (Dolph Lundgren), to find himself imprisoned in a CIA Blacksite on board a retrofitted nuclear submarine. Enlisting the help of a rookie agent and another prisoner, he must race against the clock to escape and discover who set him up.

He goes through his recent memories. Wheeler is a CIA agent looking for a leak in the CIA along with his partner Melissa Ballard (Courtney B. Turk) by using a USB drive that needs two components to activate. Melissa carries the drive, while Wheeler carries the activation key. After he wakes up the next day, a group of men with large guns show up. While trying to escape, Melissa is apparently killed. Wheeler manages to escape. He goes to meet his handler, but finds his handler killed. Wheeler is captured and drugged by Agent Ferris (Patrick Kilpatrick), who believes Wheeler is responsible for the deaths of his fellow agents. Agent Rhodes (Al Sapienza) believes Wheeler is innocent. They take Wheeler to the submarine for interrogation, where they meet the crew. The crew is split between those who operate the submarine, led by Captain Darrow (John Posey); the security crew, led by Kingsley (Aleksander Vayshelboym) and CIA agents Cassie Taylor (Jasmine Waltz) and Ellis Ryan (Aaron O'Connell). Wheeler then wakes up.

Wheeler is interrogated by Agent Preston and his helper and believes he was set up. Agent Rhodes interrogates Wheeler about the location of the activation key. Wheeler realizes Rhodes is a traitor and Rhodes kills the rest of the CIA crew with his henchman (Tom Glynn) and forces the rest of the submarine's security crew to follow his orders. Wheeler manages to escape, but is captured by Cassie and Ellis. They plan on going to the control room to contact someone topside, knowing the submarine would have to rise to the surface or float the buoy. When they reach the control room, they are ambushed and manage to escape, but Ellis is killed in the gunfire.

Wheeler and Taylor force the crew to make the submarine go topside by increasing the pressure of a pipe. While making their way through, Taylor is shot, but survives. Taylor learns that Rhodes recruited Wheeler into the CIA and he wants to sell the drive, which contains information that would jeopardize agents. They get help by freeing Marco, who is German Special Forces and is imprisoned in the submarine because he also knows what is going on, and thus cannot be killed. Rhodes directs his helper to go to 'Plan B' whilst convincing the submarine crew to stay at their current depth by telling them Wheeler is a traitor. He allied himself with Kingsley and the rest of security. Captain Darrow is still ordered to go topside and meet an extraction team in Cuba.

Wheeler, Taylor and Marco ambush Kingsley and his crew, killing all but Kingsley. Wheeler and Taylor track Rhodes, who takes Captain Darrow captive. Taylor is taken captive by Rhodes' helper. It is revealed that Agent Ballard is in league with Rhodes, having faked her death. Ballard wants to take Wheeler with them to recover the activation key, as she, Rhodes and his helper are set to make millions. Wheeler turns on the phone and speaker in the submarine so that the extraction team are aware of what is going on. A gunfight ensues. Rhodes' helper and the submarine crew kill each other. Ballard shoots Wheeler and escapes instead of killing Taylor, and Wheeler kills Rhodes.

Wheeler and Taylor are vindicated by the CIA. They are told the CIA cannot open a case file because the submarine is a black site and cannot admit their guilt as that would show their incompetence. The CIA is currently looking for Ballard and direct Wheeler and Taylor to partner up and search for Rhodes' buyer. It is revealed Marco escaped the submarine and left Kingsley alive, naked and tied up with scarves. For helping Marco escape, Marco tracks Ballard and kills her, letting Wheeler know they are now even.

== Cast ==
- Jean-Claude Van Damme as CIA Agent Scott Wheeler
- Dolph Lundgren as Marco
- Jasmine Waltz as CIA Agent Cassie Taylor
- Al Sapienza as CIA Agent Edward Rhodes
- Patrick Kilpatrick as CIA Agent Patrick Ferris
- Courtney B. Turk as CIA Agent Melissa Ballard
- Aaron O'Connell as CIA Agent Ellis Ryan
- Aleksander Vayshelboym as Kingsley
- Cathal Pendred as Dax
- Kris Van Damme as Kagan
- Tandi Tugwell as Riley
- John Posey as Captain Darrows
- Tom Glynn as "Crewcut"
- Ian Niles as Reed
- Lance E. Nichols as Buchanan
- Christopher Heskey as Tach Team Leader

== Production ==
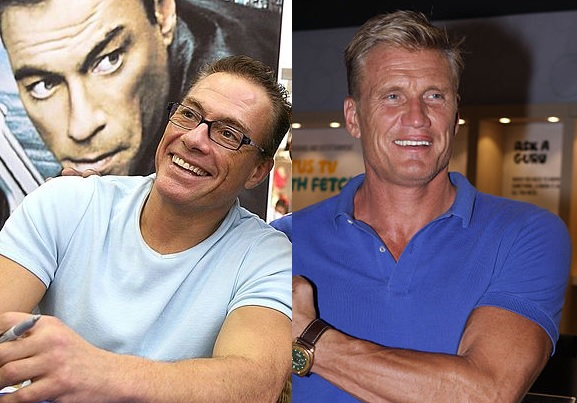
Van Damme (left) and Lundgren (right) portray Wheeler and Marco, respectively

=== Development ===
Black Water was officially announced on January, 4th 2017 with Jean-Claude van Damme and Dolph Lundgren co-starring. Van Damme and Lundgren first collaborated on Universal Soldier in 1992. Since then, they've appeared in two sequels together (Universal Soldier: Regeneration and Universal Soldier: Day of Reckoning), as well as The Expendables 2. According to screenwriter Chad Law, Black Water "came together" when producer Richard Switzer "called me up and said he wanted to do an action movie set on a submarine. That was it really ... and we took it from there." Law and Switzer had collaborated with Lundgren in 2017 when filming the action thriller Altitude. Furthermore, Law "specifically" wrote 2012's Six Bullets for Van Damme, after being hired by producer Brad Krevoy.

=== Filming ===
Early reports indicated filming was set to begin in January, 2017, with "some filming" taking place in Mobile, Alabama. Production wrapped by March 31 of the same year, with Van Damme stating the month before (on February 27), "We officially wrapped Black Water. Thank you to all the cast and crew! It's been a pleasure working with you!"

== Reception ==
=== Critical response ===
On review aggregator Rotten Tomatoes, the film has an approval rating of 0% based on nine reviews, with an average rating of 3.3/10.
