= Cody Christian =

American actor (born 1995)

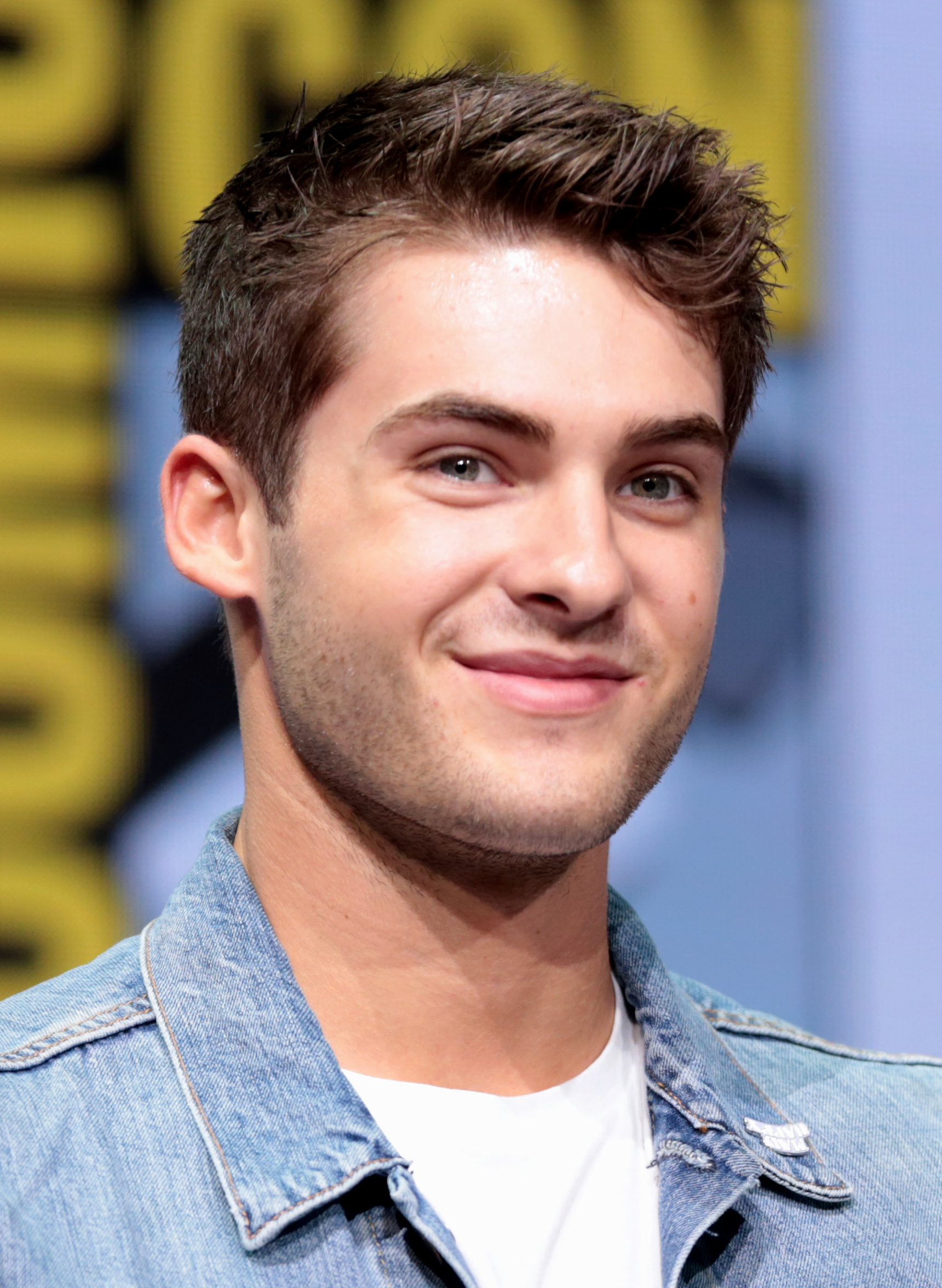
- Christian in 2017
- Born: Cody Allen Christian; April 15, 1995 (age 31); Portland, Maine, U.S.
- Occupation: Actor
- Years active: 2006–present

Cody Allen Christian (born April 15, 1995) is an American actor. He is best known for his roles as Mike Montgomery in the ABC Family/Freeform series Pretty Little Liars, Theo Raeken in the fifth and sixth seasons of the MTV series Teen Wolf, for which he received a nomination for Teen Choice Award for Choice Summer TV Star: Male at the Teen Choice Awards, and Asher Adams in The CW series All American. He is also known for voicing Cloud Strife in the Final Fantasy VII Remake franchise, for which he received the Golden Joystick Award for Best Lead Performer and a nomination for BAFTA Award for Performer in a Leading Role.

== Career ==
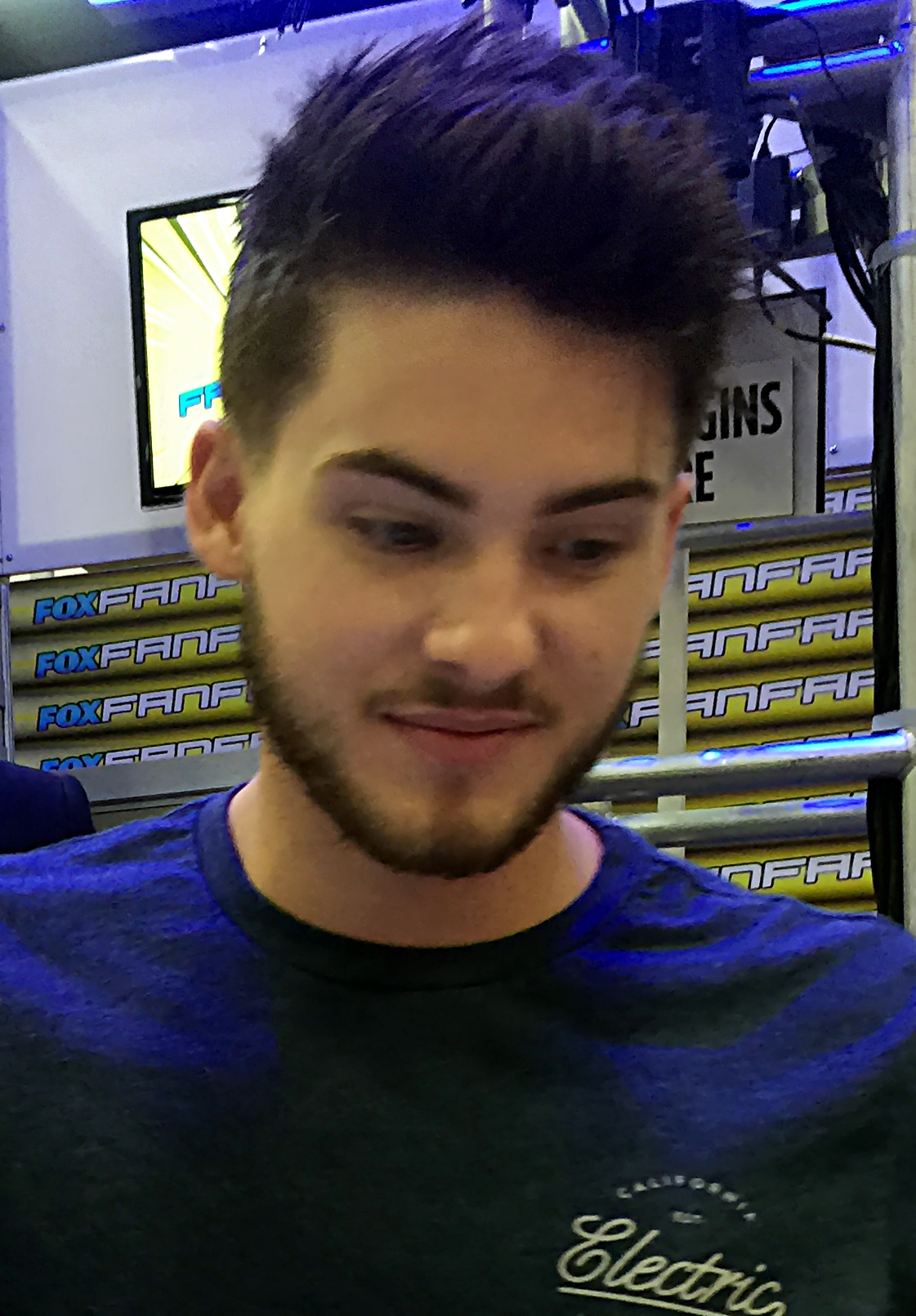
Christian in 2015

Christian is known for his roles as Mike Montgomery in the Freeform series Pretty Little Liars, Theo Raeken in seasons 5 and 6 of the MTV series Teen Wolf, and Asher Adams in The CW series All American. Other acting credits include appearances in True Blood, Grey's Anatomy, and Back to You and the films Kill the Irishman and The Starving Games, a parody of The Hunger Games films.

As a voice actor, Christian has voiced Cloud Strife in Final Fantasy VII Remake, reprising the role in Chocobo GP, Crisis Core: Final Fantasy VII Reunion, Final Fantasy VII Rebirth, Final Fantasy Tactics: The Ivalice Chronicles, and Final Fantasy VII Revelation.

On June 26, 2020, Christian was among the Teen Wolf alums who participated in a virtual charity stream to celebrate the series' ninth anniversary and benefit First Responders First, a charity which aided frontline workers during the COVID-19 pandemic.

== Personal life ==
Christian's mother is Penobscot and grew up on a reservation in Maine. She is also a breast cancer survivor, and he has campaigned to raise money for breast cancer research.

== Filmography ==
=== Film ===
Year	Title	Role	Notes
2006	The Profound Mysteries of Tommy Kuglar	Young Tommy Kuglar	Short film
2006	Corndog of Tolerance	The Kid	Short film
2008	Sky Scrambler Commercial	The Kid	Mock commercial
2009	Surrogates	Boy Canter	
2011	Kill the Irishman	Young Danny Greene	
2013	The Starving Games	Peter Malarkey	
2015	Killing Animals	Roberto	
2016	Submerged	Dylan	
2018	Assassination Nation	Johnny	
2021	Notorious Nick	Nick Newell	
2023	Jump Out	Rizal	

=== Television ===
Year	Title	Role	Notes
2007	State of Mind	Adam	Unknown episodes
2007	Back to You	Xander Tucker	Episode: "Gracie's Bully"
2008	True Blood	Screaming Boy	Episode: "Sparks Fly Out"
2010	Grey's Anatomy	Brad Walker	Episode: "State of Love and Trust"
2010–2015	Pretty Little Liars	Mike Montgomery	Recurring role (seasons 1–2, 4–5), Guest role (season 6), 29 episodes
2012	Lab Rats	Kavan	Episode: "Crush, Chop, and Burn, Part I"
2012	Beautiful People	Kyle	Unsold television pilot
2012	Body of Proof	Greg Lux	Episode: "Home Invasion"
2013	Austin & Ally	Elliot	Episode: "Campers & Complications"
2013	Supah Ninjas	Flint Forster	3 episodes
2014	See Dad Run	Evan	Episode: "See Dad Roast the Toast"
2015–2017	Teen Wolf	Theo Raeken	Recurring role (seasons 5 and 6); 30 episodes
2018–2024, 2026	All American	Asher Adams	Main role (seasons 1–6), season 8 (guest star); 93 episodes

=== Video games ===
Year	Title	Role	Notes
2020	Final Fantasy VII Remake	Cloud Strife (voice)	
2022	Chocobo GP	Cloud Strife (voice)	Archive audio from Final Fantasy VII Remake
2022	Crisis Core: Final Fantasy VII Reunion	Cloud Strife (voice)	
2024	Final Fantasy VII Rebirth	Cloud Strife (voice)	
2025	Final Fantasy Tactics: The Ivalice Chronicles	Cloud Strife (voice)	
2027	Final Fantasy VII Revelation	Cloud Strife (voice)	

== Discography ==
=== As Cody ===
Studio Albums

List of studio albums with selected details
Title	Details	Ref.
Pilot	Released: September 5, 2025; Format: digital download, streaming; Label: Fake Reality (Self-released)	

Pilot album track listing

No.	Title	Writer(s)	Producer(s)
1.	"pilot episode"	Cody Christian, Jonathan "Offeshorex2" Roberto	Offeshorex2
2.	"still cody"	Cody Christian, Vagan "GOLDMVN" Partizpanyan	GOLDMVN
3.	"cloudy daze"	Cody Christian, Jonathan "Offeshorex2" Roberto	Offeshorex2
4.	"too much"	Cody Christian, Vagan "GOLDMVN" Partizpanyan	GOLDMVN
5.	"breathe"	Cody Christian, Vagan "GOLDMVN" Partizpanyan	GOLDMVN
6.	"no sleep"	Cody Christian, Vagan "GOLDMVN" Partizpanyan	GOLDMVN
7.	"highs n lows"	Cody Christian, Vagan "GOLDMVN" Partizpanyan	GOLDMVN
8.	"my way"	Cody Christian, Vagan "GOLDMVN" Partizpanyan	GOLDMVN
9.	"make believe"	Cody Christian, Vagan "GOLDMVN" Partizpanyan	GOLDMVN
10.	"better than ever"	Cody Christian, Vagan "GOLDMVN" Partizpanyan	GOLDMVN
11.	"nowadays"	Cody Christian, Jonathan "Offeshorex2" Roberto	Offeshorex2
12.	"city"	Cody Christian, Vagan "GOLDMVN" Partizpanyan	GOLDMVN
13.	"slow motion"	Bruce Weigner, Cody Christian, Vagan "GOLDMVN" Partizpanyan	GOLDMVN
14.	"episode 7"	Brent Ulrich, Cody Christian	Brent Ulrich

Singles

List of singles as lead artist, showing year released and album name
Title	Year	Credit	Album	Ref.
Hills	2019	Cody Christian	Non-album single	
Almost	2019	Cody Christian	Non-album single	
Drippin	2019	Cody Christian	Non-album single	
Blessed	2019	Cody Christian	Non-album single	
Vacation	2019	Cody Christian	Non-album single	
Pilot Episode	2025	Cody	Pilot	

== Awards and nominations ==
Year	Award	Category	Work	Result	Ref
2017	Teen Choice Awards	Choice Summer TV Actor	Teen Wolf (Theo Raeken)	Nominated	
2021	British Academy Games Awards	Performer in a Leading Role	Final Fantasy VII Remake (Cloud Strife)	Nominated	
2024	Golden Joystick Awards	Best Lead Performer	Final Fantasy VII Rebirth (Cloud Strife)	Won	
