= Nick Newell =

American mixed martial arts fighter

- Born: March 17, 1986 (age 40); Milford, Connecticut, U.S.
- Nickname: Notorious
- Height: 5 ft 10 in (178 cm)
- Weight: 155 lb (70 kg)
- Division: Lightweight
- Reach: 60 in (150 cm)
- Fighting out of: West Haven, Connecticut, U.S.
- Team: Fighting Arts Academy
- Rank: Black belt in Brazilian jiu-jitsu under Andrew Calandrelli
- Wrestling: NCAA Division III Wrestling
- Years active: 2008–2021

Mixed martial arts record
- Total: 20
- Wins: 16
- By knockout: 2
- By submission: 11
- By decision: 3
- Losses: 4
- By knockout: 1
- By decision: 3

Other information
- University: Western New England University
- Children: 2
- Mixed martial arts record from Sherdog

Nick Newell (born March 17, 1986) is an American mixed martial artist, who competed in the lightweight division.

== Early life ==
Newell was born with congenital amputation of his left arm, which ends just below his elbow. Newell has a very short yet muscular stump of his forearm which he learned from a young age to grasp objects with. Newell was born with his stump and therefore learned to use it like a hand from birth. Newell grew up playing first soccer and then baseball, but pivoted to high school wrestling in Jonathan Law High School. Upon joining his wrestling team, he thought about quitting after his very first session because it was "the hardest thing I had done in my life", but his mother did not allow him to, and instead he worked hard from then on.

After graduating from high school, Newell attended Western New England University where he continued wrestling. He has over 300 victories between high school and college in wrestling (if you include non competition matches in college).

Newell stated that while growing up, he idolized former Yankees pitcher Jim Abbott, who has no right hand and was an inspiration for Newell to challenge himself.

His roommate in college was former WWE wrestler Curt Hawkins. They would watch The Ultimate Fighter, which was on the same channel right after WWE Raw, and Newell has said this is what inspired him to take up MMA.

== Mixed martial arts career ==
Before turning professional, he amassed an amateur record of 5 wins, 1 loss. He describes his early MMA career as a struggle, not because he could not win, but because other fighters did not want to fight a one armed fighter. The potential opponents who turned down fights against him felt that it would be a lose-lose situation for them, as if they won, it would've been against a one-armed fighter; if they lost, it would've been against a fighter with one arm. As such, finding quality opponents became a struggle for Newell.

=== Xtreme Fighting Championships ===
In 2011, Newell signed a multi-fight deal with both Shark Fights and Xtreme Fighting Championships. He was supposed to have made his Shark Fights debut at Shark Fights 19, however an injury resulted in him being left off the card. He had his first bout with XFC at XFC 15: Tribute. The event was renamed 'Tribute' in honour of Nick's friend and fellow XFC signee Abi Mestre, who was killed in a motorcycle accident. Mestre was a close friend and teammate of Newell's who joined Nick last year at the open tryouts for the XFC.

Newell defeated Denis Hernandez at XFC 15 with a dominant 71 second submission (heel hook) victory. Multiple videos and sources covered the fight, with many videos of the whole fight being posted on multiple MMA websites, as well as being shared across many Facebook and Twitter pages worldwide.

He did an interview with Bleacher Report to talk about the fame he has been getting since his first televised fight at the XFC event. According to him, all the videos of the fight combined have reached around 4,500,000 views.

Newell then defeated Chris Coggins via majority decision in what was Newell's biggest test in his MMA career so far.

Newell defeated David Mays at XFC 19 after landing a big left knee on Mays chin, rendering him unconscious.

He next fought for the vacated XFC Lightweight title at XFC 21 against Bellator veteran Eric Reynolds. Newell won the fight via submission in the first round and took the XFC Lightweight Title in the process.

On June 14, he was scheduled to defend his XFC title against Scott Holtzman, however Newell turned down the fight stating that he only wants to fight ex-UFC fighters. Newell would be stripped of his belt.

=== World Series of Fighting ===
On May 28, 2013, Newell signed a multi-fight contract with World Series of Fighting. WSOF President Ray Sefo hinted that Newell will be featured on the upcoming WSOF 4 & 5 cards against an opponent who has yet to be named. On June 20, it was announced that Newell would fight Keon Caldwell at World Series of Fighting 4. He won the fight via submission in the first round.

For his second fight with the promotion, Newell faced Sabah Fadai at World Series of Fighting 7: Karakhanyan vs. Palmer on December 7, 2013. Again, he won the fight via submission in the first round.

Newell challenged Justin Gaethje for the WSOF Lightweight Championship at WSOF 11. He lost the fight via knockout in the second round, suffering the first defeat of his professional career.

On February 13, 2015, it was announced that Newell has signed a new four-fight contract with WSOF.

After his first loss, Newell returned to the promotion on April 10, 2015, at WSOF 20. He faced Joe Condon and won the back-and-forth fight by unanimous decision.

Newell returned to the promotion on October 17, 2015, at WSOF 24. He faced Tom Marcellino and won the back-and-forth bout by unanimous decision. After the fight Newell announced his retirement from MMA.

=== Legacy Fighting Alliance ===
Newell came out of retirement on March 9, 2018, when he met Sonny Luque in a lightweight main event at LFA 35 in Houston. The event aired on AXS TV. Newell won the contest via tapout due to a neck crank at 2:10 of the first round.

=== Dana White's Contender Series ===
On April 25, 2018, it was announced that Newell would be featured on Dana White's Contender Series 14. He faced Alex Munoz on the July 24 edition of the series, and lost the fight by unanimous decision.

=== CES MMA ===
On April 15, 2019, it was announced that Newell has signed with CES MMA and would be making his promotional debut against Kalvin Hackney at CES MMA 56 on May 31, 2019. However, Hackney was forced to withdraw from the bout and was replaced by Antonio Castillo Jr. Newell submitted Castillo Jr. in the first round with a rear naked choke.

=== Bellator MMA ===
On July 23, 2019, it was announced that Newell had signed a single-fight deal with Bellator MMA. Newell's debut took place at Bellator 225 against Corey Browning on August 24. He won the fight via an arm triangle submission in the first round.

On September 18, 2019, Bellator president Scott Coker announced on his social media that Newell had signed a four-fight contract with the organization. In his first fight on that contract, Newell faced Manny Muro at Bellator 232 on October 26, 2019. He lost the back-and-forth fight via split decision.

Newell was expected to face Zach Zane at Bellator 241 on March 13, 2020. However, the whole event was eventually cancelled due to the prevailing COVID-19 pandemic.

Newell faced Bobby King at Bellator 260 on June 11, 2021. He lost the fight via split decision.

== Personal life ==
Newell and his wife have two sons.

Newell's life story is the focus of the film Notorious Nick, where he is played by Cody Christian.

Newell currently runs an MMA school called Fighting Arts Academy in Milford, Connecticut.

== Championships and accomplishments ==
- World Series of Fighting
  - 2013 Submission of the Year
- Xtreme Fighting Championships
  - XFC Lightweight Championship (One time; former)

== Mixed martial arts record ==
Professional record breakdown
20 matches	16 wins	4 losses
By knockout	2	1
By submission	11	0
By decision	3	3

Res.	Record	Opponent	Method	Event	Date	Round	Time	Location	Notes
Loss	16–4	Bobby King	Decision (split)	Bellator 260	June 11, 2021	3	5:00	Uncasville, Connecticut, United States	
Loss	16–3	Manny Muro	Decision (split)	Bellator 232	October 26, 2019	3	5:00	Uncasville, Connecticut, United States	
Win	16–2	Corey Browning	Submission (arm-triangle choke)	Bellator 225	August 24, 2019	1	3:15	Bridgeport, Connecticut, United States	
Win	15–2	Antonio Castillo Jr.	Submission (rear-naked choke)	CES MMA 56	May 31, 2019	1	2:06	Hartford, Connecticut, United States	
Loss	14–2	Alex Munoz	Decision (unanimous)	Dana White's Contender Series 14	July 24, 2018	3	5:00	Las Vegas, Nevada, United States	
Win	14–1	Sonny Luque	Submission (neck crank)	LFA 35	March 9, 2018	1	2:10	Houston, Texas, United States	
Win	13–1	Tom Marcellino	Decision (unanimous)	WSOF 24	October 17, 2015	3	5:00	Mashantucket, Connecticut, United States	
Win	12–1	Joe Condon	Decision (unanimous)	WSOF 20	April 10, 2015	3	5:00	Mashantucket, Connecticut, United States	
Loss	11–1	Justin Gaethje	TKO (punch)	WSOF 11	July 5, 2014	2	3:09	Daytona Beach, Florida, United States	For the WSOF Lightweight Championship.
Win	11–0	Sabah Fadai	Submission (guillotine choke)	WSOF 7	December 7, 2013	1	1:21	Vancouver, British Columbia, Canada.	
Win	10–0	Keon Caldwell	Submission (guillotine choke)	WSOF 4	August 10, 2013	1	2:07	Ontario, California, United States.	
Win	9–0	Eric Reynolds	Submission (rear-naked choke)	XFC 21: Night of Champions 2	December 7, 2012	1	1:22	Nashville, Tennessee, United States	Won the XFC Lightweight Championship.
Win	8–0	David Mays	KO (knee)	XFC 19: Charlotte Showdown	August 3, 2012	1	2:01	Charlotte, North Carolina, United States	
Win	7–0	Chris Coggins	Decision (majority)	XFC 17: Apocalypse	April 13, 2012	3	5:00	Jackson, Tennessee, United States	Catchweight (152 lbs) bout.
Win	6–0	Denis Hernandez	Submission (heel hook)	XFC 15: Tribute	December 3, 2011	1	1:11	Tampa, Florida, United States	
Win	5–0	Anthony Kaponis	Submission (armbar)	Cage Titans 5 - Vendetta	June 25, 2011	1	1:01	Boston, Massachusetts, United States	
Win	4–0	Billy Walsh	Submission (armbar)	Cage Titans 3 - Mayhem	January 28, 2011	1	1:24	Randolph, Massachusetts, United States	
Win	3–0	Steve Butler	Submission (rear-naked choke)	Triumph Fighter 1 - Supremacy	March 27, 2010	1	1:59	Milford, New Hampshire, United States	
Win	2–0	John Biasiucci	Submission (rear-naked choke)	ICE Fighter - Christmas Beatdown	December 12, 2009	1	1:31	Worcester, Massachusetts, United States	
Win	1–0	Daniel Ford	TKO (punch)	CFX 3 - Rumble in the Jungle	June 20, 2009	1	4:20	Plymouth, Massachusetts, United States	

== See also ==
- List of male mixed martial artists
