= Money Plane =

2020 American heist film

- Theatrical release poster
- Directed by: Andrew Lawrence
- Screenplay by: Andrew Lawrence; Tim Schaaf
- Story by: Tyler W. Konney; Richard Switzer; Andrew Lawrence; Tim Schaaf
- Produced by: Richard Switzer; Tyler W. Konney
- Starring: Adam Copeland; Katrina Norman; Patrick Lamont Jr.; Joey Lawrence; Matthew Lawrence; Al Sapienza; Reid Perkins; Aleksander Vayshelboym; Andrew Lawrence; Denise Richards; Kelsey Grammer; Thomas Jane
- Cinematography: Pasha Patriki
- Edited by: Austin Nordell
- Music by: David Bateman
- Production companies: Taylor & Dodge Entertainment; Dawn's Light Productions
- Distributed by: Quiver Distribution
- Release date: July 10, 2020
- Running time: 82 minutes
- Country: United States
- Language: English
- Budget: $586,443
- Box office: $618

Money Plane is a 2020 American action film directed by Andrew Lawrence, who also co-wrote the screenplay with Tim Schaaf from a story by them and the film's producers Tyler W. Konney and Richard Switzer. It stars Adam Copeland, Katrina Norman, Patrick Lamont Jr., Joey Lawrence, Matthew Lawrence, Al Sapienza, Reid Perkins, Aleksander Vayshelboym, Andrew Lawrence, Denise Richards, Kelsey Grammer, and Thomas Jane. It was released to video-on-demand services on July 10, 2020, by Quiver Distribution, and received generally negative reviews from critics.

== Plot ==
At an art museum, Jack Reese, a professional thief and former gambler, attempts to steal The Disturbing Duckling, a (fictional) painting by Asger Jorn, with the help of his crew, consisting of Isabella Voltaic, Trey Peterson, and Iggy. When Jack enters the museum, he finds out that the painting is no longer there and that he and his team have been compromised, forcing them to flee empty-handed.

Without any other options, Jack goes to the house of the man who hired Reese and his crew for the heist in the first place, notorious gang leader Darius Grouch III, nicknamed "The Rumble". Already in debt to The Rumble before the botched heist, and under the threat of harm to his family, Jack takes one more job from him to clear his debt: He has to sneak aboard the "Money Plane", an airborne casino that caters to elite criminals, in order to steal its reserves of cryptocurrency and hard cash. The night before embarking on the heist, Jack has his best friend, Harry Greer, keep an eye on his family while he is gone, and Harry also offers to look into how the museum heist got compromised.

Jack and Trey board the plane under the guises of two human traffickers named Monroe and McGillicuddy, while Isabella poses as one of the flight attendants. As the plane takes off, two employees, codenamed the "Concierge" and "Bookkeeper", welcome their guests, explaining the activities and amenities on board while informing them of the plane's zero-tolerance stance on cheating. After several hands of Texas hold 'em poker, Jack leaves Trey in the main gambling room to subdue the pilots and take control of the plane. During the flight, Trey improbably wins a series of games on the plane (including Russian roulette and betting on the outcome of a fight between a man and a cobra). Meanwhile, Jack establishes contact with Iggy, who is on the ground to facilitate the transfer of the plane's cryptocurrency, as well as taking calls from The Rumble, who demands to be kept in the loop with the mission and reminds Jack of the consequences should the team fail.

In the plane's vault, Isabella breaks off to secure the hard cash that they need to steal, getting into a fight with a guard, whom she kills before he can blow her cover. Meanwhile, Jack calls Harry while in-air, who reveals that The Disturbing Duckling was already owned by The Rumble and that they are being set up to fail. In too deep to back out, the crew elects to keep going with the heist while asking Harry to work on a "fail-safe" measure on the ground.

Trey and Isabella work on securing the server room where the cryptocurrency is stored, and Iggy establishes a secure link between him and the plane to start transferring the cryptocurrency. However, the team on the plane are attacked by two of the Money Plane's guests, who caught wind of their actions, and Iggy is ambushed by assassins who are implied to be on The Rumble's payroll. Trey and Isabella manage to fight off and kill their attackers, while Iggy is saved by a handgun-toting drone piloted by Harry. However, the servers have been damaged during the fight, forcing them to download the cryptocurrency onto a USB drive, which, if used, would alert the Money Plane.

A team of assassins is sent to Jack's home to kill his family, but Harry, revealed to be present, guns them down. Meanwhile, the team decides to not keep any of the money and instead donate it to charitable causes around the world, with special focus on those affected by guests of the Money Plane. Jack makes one final call to The Rumble, who is angered by the team's betrayal, but is stunned when Jack reveals he has played a clip of The Rumble stating his identity and his intentions to rob the Money Plane over the plane's radio, sealing his fate. The team escapes the plane via an emergency exit door while letting the hard cash fall out of it. Meanwhile, the Money Plane has assassins sent to The Rumble’s house to kill him.

Three months after the heist, two warehouse workers in Istanbul open a painting shipping case only to find out that the artwork inside has been stolen and replaced. Back home, it is revealed that Jack and his crew have stolen The Disturbing Duckling and that the price has been driven up to 60 million dollars, which Jack has split up five ways between him, his crew, and Harry, ensuring that they all have enough money to retire.

== Cast ==
- Adam Copeland as Jack Reese
- Kelsey Grammer as Darius Emanuel Grouch III, aka "The Rumble"
- Thomas Jane as Harry Greer
- Denise Richards as Sarah Reese
- Katrina Norman as Isabella Voltaic
- Patrick Lamont Jr. as Trey Peterson
- Andrew Lawrence as Iggy
- Joey Lawrence as The Concierge
- Matthew Lawrence as J. R. Crockett ("The Cowboy")
- Al Sapienza as The Bookkeeper
- Aleksander Vayshelboym as Ivan Vitali
- Reid Perkins as Reid
- Jolene Kim as Mia Yamada
- Candi Brooks as The Stewardess
- Tom DeNucci as P-Roach
- Emma Gordon as Claire Reese

== Production ==
Inspired by heist films such as Ocean's Eleven, airplane films such as Con Air, and their experiences in Las Vegas, producers Switzer and Konney turned to Andrew Lawrence. Lawrence proposed an airplane casino film, which Switzer and Konney agreed to fund after Lawrence wrote a screenplay. After securing Adam Copeland for the role of Jack Reese, the producers cast Thomas Jane as Reese's mentor. Kelsey Grammer was their first casting choice for Darius Grouch, though they did not expect him to accept the role. To their surprise, Grammer accepted, later saying that the role "seemed like a fun, mustache-twirling kind of character."

Principal photography began in October 2019 and continued through late December. After plans to film in Romania and Toronto proved unworkable, the production moved to Baton Rouge. The project's low budget and rushed schedule frequently required Lawrence to improvise and to adjust shooting based on which sets were available: "We were literally building the plane set while we were shooting ... We picked corners of the set that were built, and shot in those corners. We had to do that all the time," he said. After post-production early in the year, the film was released in July 2020.

== Reception ==
Money Plane received an overall negative critical reception. As of 10 October 2021, the film holds a 23% approval rating on Rotten Tomatoes, based on 14 reviews with an average rating of 3.6/10. The Daily Beast described Money Plane as "the dumbest movie of 2020". The Action Elite gave the film 2.5 stars out of 5 and called it "the kind of movie that will likely be forgotten about within a matter of weeks". A review from Decider said that it was "the best and worst of what a bad movie experience can be".
