= Buddy Hutchins =

- Film poster
- Directed by: Jared Cohn
- Written by: Jared Cohn
- Produced by: Richard Switzer; Gabriel Campisi; Santino Aquino; Judy Kim
- Starring: Jamie Kennedy; Sally Kirkland; Sara Malakul Lane
- Release date: February 14, 2015
- Country: United States
- Language: English

Buddy Hutchins is a dark comedy thriller film starring Jamie Kennedy, written and directed by Jared Cohn, and produced by Richard Switzer and Gabriel Campisi.

== Plot ==
Buddy Hutchins is just a regular guy doing his best to support a wife and two kids. A recovering alcoholic, Buddy hasn't had a drink for the better part of a year, but it turns out the only reward for his good behavior is a failing business and a cheating wife. Throw in a ruthless bounty hunter and a hot-tempered ex, and Buddy's already short fuse is about to blow. Pushed over the edge and armed with a chainsaw, Buddy Hutchins is out for blood.

== Cast ==
- Jamie Kennedy as Buddy Hutchins
- Sally Kirkland as Bertha
- Sara Malakul Lane as Evelyn
- Hiram A. Murray as Detective Hunter
- David Gere as Don
- Steve Hanks as Troy
- Richard Switzer as Joel
- Demetrius Stear as Ryan
- Remington Moses as Stephanie

== Production ==
The film was shot in February 2014 in Los Angeles, California with a large portion shot in Van Nuys, California, and director Jared Cohn's house. The film was executive produced by Santino Aquino, Gabriel Campisi, and Judy Kim, and stars Jamie Kennedy, Sally Kirkland, and Sara Malakul Lane. The screenplay was also written by Cohn, ten years prior to production.

== Release ==
The film was released on February 14, 2015 (Valentine's Day) in the United States.
