= Nordakademie =

Private university in Elmshorn, Germany

Coordinates: 53°45′15″N 9°40′19″E

NORDAKADEMIE University of Applied Sciences
- NORDAKADEMIE Hochschule der Wirtschaft
- Motto: 100 % Deine Zukunft!
- Motto in English: 100 % Your future!
- Type: private
- Established: 1992
- Chancellor: Anke Vogler
- President: Stefan Wiedmann
- Students: 2,506 (2024/2025)
- Location: Elmshorn, Schleswig-Holstein, Germany
- Website: nordakademie.de/en/

The Nordakademie University of Applied Sciences (stylized as NORDAKADEMIE) is a private, state-recognised university of applied sciences based in Elmshorn, Germany. It offers dual and part-time study programmes in business administration, business informatics, industrial engineering and computer science, as well as certificate courses and further education programmes.

== History ==
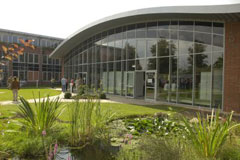
Nordakademie Audimax located at the Elmshorn Campus

The university was founded in 1992 on the initiative of North German companies to enable dual study programmes, and initially began operating in Pinneberg in 1993. The founding rector was Georg Plate. In 1996, after a three-year qualification phase, Nordakademie received permanent state recognition. After the original premises at Pinneberg railway station became too small, the university moved to its current campus in Elmshorn in 1997.

Former dual diploma programmes were converted to bachelor's degrees in the course of the Bologna Process from the winter semester of 2006 onwards. In 2013, an additional campus was opened in Altona-Altstadt (Hamburg), where part-time master's and continuing education programmes are offered. In 2017, a new building with digital technology and student flats was inaugurated on the Elmshorn campus.

== Organisation, ownership, and locations ==
The university is run as a non-profit public limited company. Its main shareholder is the German employers' association Nordmetall. Other shareholders include companies from various industries. The current president is Stefan Wiedmann. The university has campuses in Elmshorn and Hamburg.

== Study programmes ==
The university offers dual bachelor's degree programmes at its Elmshorn campus and part-time master's programmes at its Hamburg campus. The core subjects are business administration, business informatics, industrial engineering, computer science/software and IT engineering. In addition, further education and certificate courses at university level are offered, which are completed with an examination.

Nordakademie offers five seven-semester dual bachelor's degree programmes, each leading to a Bachelor of Science with 210 ECTS-credits, and one six-semester dual bachelor programme leading to a Bachelor of Science with 180 ECTS-credits. Students alternate between theory and practical phases in a cooperating company.

- Bachelor of Science in Business Administration
- Bachelor of Science in Business Informatics
- Bachelor of Science in Engineering and Management
- Bachelor of Science in Applied Computer Science/Software Engineering
- Bachelor of Science in Technical Computer Science/IT Engineering
- International Engineering & Management (English-language, joint programme with local Colleges in Charleston, six semesters, 180 ECTS)

Nordakademie also offers part-time master's programmes, each leading to a Master of Science (or Master of Business Administration) degree with doctorate entitlement and admission to higher civil service, at its Hamburg location:

- Master of Science in Applied Data Science
- Master of Science in Financial Management and Accounting
- Master of Science in General Management
- Master of Science in Business Informatics
- Master of Science in Engineering and Management
- Master of Science in HR Management & Business Psychology
- Master of Science in Digital Marketing Management
- Master of Science in Applied Artificial Intelligence
- Master of Business Administration (MBA)

== Accreditation ==
Nordakademie has been accredited by FIBAA since 2012. Reaccreditation took place in 2018 and is valid for eight years.

== Research and key areas ==
The university engages in applied research. Its research topics include digitalisation and IT management, applied data science, user experience, sustainability and environmental management, as well as issues relating to media trust and marketing. In 2025, the Media Brand Trust Monitor was developed at Nordakademie. This is a cross-country trust scale for media brands, which is also relevant for the advertising industry. In 2026, Nordakademie participated in a study on the motivation of Generation Z in the labour market.

Together with the University of Flensburg and the Flensburg University of Applied Sciences, Nordakademie is one of the three participating institutions of the Digital Learning Campus Schleswig-Holstein, a project by the state of Schleswig-Holstein. This project is designed to teach and practically test digital and technological skills (‘future skills’).

== Internationalisation and partner universities ==
Nordakademie maintains partnerships with universities in Europe and overseas. These are located in France, Great Britain, the three Baltic States, Spain, Ireland, Hungary, the United States, China, Australia, Canada and Chile, among others.
