= Harvey Dent (Gotham episode) =

- Gotham episode
- Episode no.: Season 1 Episode 9
- Directed by: Karen Gaviola
- Written by: Ken Woodruff
- Production code: 4X6659
- Original air date: November 17, 2014

Guest appearances
- Nicholas D'Agosto as Harvey Dent; Richard Kind as Mayor Aubrey James; Drew Powell as Butch Gilzean; Makenzie Leigh as Liza; Al Sapienza as Dick Lovecraft; Leslie Odom, Jr. as Ian Hargrove; Steve Cirbus as Gregor Kasyanov; Luke Forbes as John Hargrove

Episode chronology
← Previous "The Mask"	Next → "Lovecraft"

"Harvey Dent" is the ninth episode of the television series Gotham. It premiered on FOX on November 17, 2014, and was written by Ken Woodruff, and directed by Karen Gaviola. In this episode, trying to solve the Waynes' murder, Gordon (Ben McKenzie) allies with ADA Harvey Dent (Nicholas D'Agosto) while also investigating corruption in Gotham.

The episode was watched by 6.49 million viewers, an improvement over the previous episode. It received generally positive reviews, though critics felt that Dent's character was "wasted".

== Plot ==
James Gordon places Selina Kyle in custody in Wayne Manor as she is the only witness in the Waynes' murder. Meanwhile, a bomb maker, Ian Hargrove, is abducted by Russian mobsters led by Gregor Kasyanov while being transferred from Blackgate Penitentiary. The Russians plan on robbing a safe vault with the bombs he makes.

Gordon, Renee Montoya and Crispus Allen meet with Assistant District Attorney Harvey Dent to discuss the Waynes' murder. After Gordon shows up a drawing from the killer stated by Selina, Dent deduces it may be Dick Lovecraft, a corrupt billionaire, as his fortune rose after their murders. Dent later interrogates Lovecraft, who denies any involvement in the crimes. When Lovecraft mocks Dent, Dent grabs Lovecraft and threatens him, showing signs of an unstable, second persona.

Gordon and Harvey Bullock find Hargrove in the Gotham Munition Factory but they are ambushed by the Russians, who take away Hargrove. After making a test, Edward Nygma tells them the bombs are designed to break through iron. The Russians force Hargrove to blow up the Gotham Armory Basement so they can steal Carmine Falcone's money. While planning their getaway, Gordon and Bullock ambush them. As Hargrove walks toward them, the truck explodes when Butch Gilzean plants a call detonator.

Oswald Cobblepot visits Liza, where he reveals he knows about her plan with Fish Mooney of taking out Falcone but promises to stay quiet. Hargrove is sent to Arkham Asylum. Alfred Pennyworth decides to let Selina stay for a while as she bonds with Bruce Wayne. After the ordeal is over, Gordon tries to contact his fiancé Barbara Kean, who left after being threatened by criminals and not feeling cared about enough by Jim. Jim leaves Barbara a voice-mail begging for her to return while she's in bed, but Barbara never answering his call. After Jim hangs up, a hand slowly reveals itself behind Barbara, rubbing her shoulder before turning her over from her side to reveal Barbara's lesbian ex-girlfriend, Renee Montoya. The two women kiss and embrace.

== Reception ==
=== Viewers ===
The episode was watched by 6.49 million viewers, with a 2.3 rating among 18-49 adults. With Live+7 DVR viewing factored in, the episode had an overall rating of 10.26 million viewers, and a 4.0 in the 18–49 demographic.

=== Critical reviews ===
Professional ratings
Review scores
Source	Rating
Rotten Tomatoes (Tomatometer)	62%
Rotten Tomatoes (Average Score)	6.0
The A.V. Club	B+
Paste Magazine	8.5
TV Fanatic	3.6/5
IGN	6.8
New York Magazine	3/5 stars

"Harvey Dent" received generally positive reviews. The episode received a rating of 62% with an average score of 6.0 out of 10 on the review aggregator Rotten Tomatoes, with the site's consensus stating: "Despite a solid procedural plot -- and the introduction of Dent himself -- 'Harvey Dent' is mostly an uneventful episode that adds little to the overall story arc."

Matt Fowler of IGN gave the episode a "okay" 6.8 out of 10 and wrote in his verdict, "I personally felt like the show had been on a bit of an upswing over the past few weeks, so I'm not sure what happened here. It wasn't all totally disposable, but there was a slight 'crash and burn' feel to it. The dialogue – from Dent, Selina, and Nygma (taking about video games for no reason, not even case related) – really stood out as being bad while Selina's message to Bruce about not being harsh enough for the streets fell flat since we'd just witnessed him beating another kid senseless last week."

The A.V. Club's Kyle Fowle gave the episode a "B+" grade and wrote, "Nuance is by no means Gotham's strong suit (and it doesn't always have to be), but compared to other episodes this season, there's a low-key confidence to the storytelling in 'Harvey Dent' that serves the characters and plot well, focusing on building tension and relationships while never really stepping into the territory of the ridiculous. The case-of-the-week is compelling, the mob power struggle continues to move in interesting directions, and we even get some wonderful development in terms of Bruce Wayne and Selina Kyle. Gotham always takes on too much–too many characters, too many plot threads, too many references. 'Harvey Dent' doesn't. It's economical, and all the better for it."
