= All-Star Weekend (film) =

Unreleased film by Jamie Foxx

- Official logo
- Directed by: Jamie Foxx
- Written by: Jamie Foxx
- Produced by: Jamie Foxx; Avram "Butch" Kaplan; Chuck Pacheco; Deon Taylor
- Starring: Jamie Foxx; Jeremy Piven; Jessica Szohr; Eva Longoria; Robert Downey Jr.; Ken Jeong; Gerard Butler; Benicio del Toro; Tyrin Turner
- Cinematography: John T. Connor
- Edited by: Patrick Nelson Barnes; Jeff Castelluccio; John Dietrick
- Music by: Ainz Prasad
- Production companies: Foxx–King Entertainment; Hidden Empire Film Group; Front Row Center Films; Sijma Equity Group; RCR Media Group
- Country: United States
- Language: English

All-Star Weekend is an unreleased American sports comedy-drama film written and directed by Jamie Foxx in his feature directorial debut. Produced by Foxx, Avram "Butch" Kaplan, Chuck Pacheco, and Deon Taylor, the film stars Foxx, Jeremy Piven, Jessica Szohr, Eva Longoria, Robert Downey Jr., Ken Jeong, Gerard Butler, and Benicio del Toro.

== Premise ==
Malik and Danny, two truck drivers who are basketball fanatics, worship their respective favorite players, LeBron James and Stephen Curry. Danny's girlfriend Abby is reconsidering the relationship because she does not want to take a back seat to his obsession. The two drivers finally get a break from their dead-end job when they win tickets to the NBA All-Star Game. On their way to the big game, Malik and Danny meet the beautiful and mysterious Asia, who might have her own hidden agenda. After many twists and turns, the guys find themselves and their heroes in a precarious life-or-death situation.

== Cast ==
- Jamie Foxx as Malik, a tow-truck driver who is a basketball fanatic, especially for the NBA superstar LeBron James. He is best friends with Danny.
  - Foxx plays two other roles: a "white, racist cop" and Cleveland A. Smith, a fictional twin brother of the real life sports television personality Stephen A. Smith.
- Jeremy Piven as Danny, a tow-truck driver who is a basketball fanatic, especially for the NBA superstar Stephen Curry. He is best friends with Malik.
- Jessica Szohr as Abby, Danny's girlfriend.
- Eva Longoria as Asia, a beautiful and mysterious woman.
- Robert Downey Jr. as a Mexican stranger
- Ken Jeong
- Gerard Butler as a Russian who loves gymnastics.
- Benicio del Toro as Dr. Phill, a tattoo artist.
- DJ Khaled
- French Montana
- Inanna Sarkis as Stephanie
- Jasmine Waltz as Josephine
- Luenell as Monique
- Terrence Terrell as LeBron James
- Corinne Foxx as Suyin
- Tyrin Turner as Juggs
- The Game as Tanner
- RD Whittington as Zev
- Floyd Mayweather Jr.
- Porscha Coleman
- Snoop Dogg

== Production ==
=== Casting ===
In October 2012, the film was first announced as part of an informal partnership between Jamie Foxx and Ken Jeong, where they agreed to star in movies written by the other. Due to the partnership, Jeong signed on to All-Star Weekend, while Foxx would have starred in Jeong's After Prom, but production on the latter film ended up in development hell. In early 2016, Robert Downey Jr., Gerard Butler, Benicio del Toro, Jessica Szohr, and Eva Longoria were confirmed to star in the film alongside Foxx and Jeong.

=== Filming ===
Principal photography began on October 26, 2016, in Los Angeles, California, with John T. Connor serving as cinematographer. Several actors were confirmed to appear including Jeremy Piven, DJ Khaled, French Montana, Inanna Sarkis, Jasmine Waltz, Luenell, Terrence Terrell, Corinne Foxx, Tyrin Turner, The Game, and RD Whittington. During a July 2017 podcast interview on The Joe Rogan Experience, Jamie Foxx revealed that he "will portray a white, racist cop" and "managed to convince Robert Downey Jr. to play a Mexican" in the film. Reiterating this during a June 2018 interview on Jimmy Kimmel Live!, Foxx revealed that Downey Jr. was only on set for four hours. In January 2019, the film was in post-production. Jeffery Alan Jones served as a re-recording mixer, via Alan Audio Works.

== Release ==
All-Star Weekend was originally scheduled to be released on February 16, 2018, to coincide with the 2018 NBA All-Star Game, but post-production was not completed in time. The film was delayed to February 22, 2019, within the week of the 2019 NBA All-Star Game, but ended up missing the release date for undisclosed reasons. The film was then projected to be released sometime later in 2019 and 2021. By August 2022, the film was shelved, due to it "trying to break open the sensitive corners with Robert Downey Jr. playing a Mexican man". Downey's role was stated to have been inspired by his character Kirk Lazarus in Tropic Thunder (2008). The film was then expected to release in 2025. In March 2025, Foxx said that the "wild humor" of Netflix's The Roast of Tom Brady convinced him audiences were ready to see All-Star Weekend. In June 2026, Ryan Scott of /Film speculated that the reason the film was never released could be due to its various controversial elements.

=== Marketing ===
In August 2024, in an effort to get the film released, Foxx "leaked" a teaser trailer, which JoBlo commented that the strategy was reminiscent of when test footage of Deadpool (2016) was leaked. In January 2025, during a promotional interview for Back in Action, Foxx revealed he knocked out Floyd Mayweather Jr. while filming a scene together for All-Star Weekend.

== See also ==
- List of basketball films
