= Devin Harjes =

American actor (1983–2025)

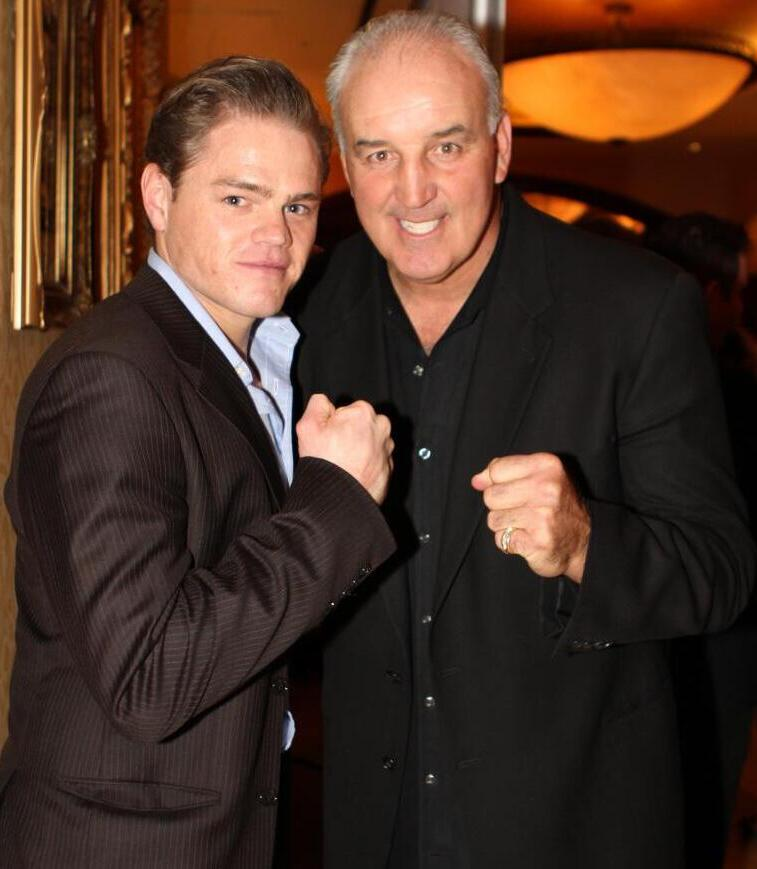
- Harjes (left) with Gerry Cooney, 2011
- Born: July 29, 1983; Lubbock, Texas, U.S.
- Died: May 27, 2025 (aged 41); New York, U.S.
- Occupation(s): Film and television actor

Devin Harjes (July 29, 1983 – May 27, 2025) was an American film and television actor. He was best known for playing the recurring role of boxer Jack Dempsey in the American crime drama television series Boardwalk Empire.

Harjes guest-starred in television programs including Daredevil, Orange Is the New Black, Blue Bloods, Elementary and Gotham, and played the recurring role of Pete Baylor in the second and third season of the NBC supernatural drama television series Manifest. He also appeared in films such as Boyz of Summer, The Forest Is Red and Rebel in the Rye.

Harjes died on May 27, 2025, from complications of cancer at the Mount Sinai West Hospital in New York, at the age of 41.
