= Jeffery Alan Jones =

Composer, sound designer and re-recording mixer

- Born: July 31; Long Beach, California
- Occupations: Composer, Sound designer, Re-Recording Mixer
- Years active: 30 years
- Website: https://www.alanaudioworks.com/

Jeffery Alan Jones is a composer, sound designer and re-recording mixer. In 2017, Jeffery won the Grand Jury Award – Best Narrative Feature at SXSW Film Festival for music and sound design in the film Most Beautiful Island and was acclaimed for his work in the film Bitch which debuted at The Sundance Film festival.

In the video game industry, he has worked on Call of Duty, Borderlands, Star Trek, Ghost Recon, Pirates of the Caribbean, Mortal Kombat, and Star Wars. He has also collaborated with big brands, including Coca-Cola, Nike, Reebok, GoPro, and Google.

He conducted The National Chinese Orchestra in Beijing, China and toured with them all across Asia. He also worked with the famous filmmaker Sherwood Hu who invited him to teach classes at the prestigious Shanghai University for the Arts.

In 1990 Jeffery built his own music recording studio beginning with only a 4-track analog tape recorder and a Mac+ computer. Today, Alan Audio Works, located in Los Angeles, serves as both as a state of the art studio. At Alan Audio Works, he has mixed movies, such as Bayou Caviar, starring Cuba Gooding Jr. and Richard Dreyfuss, All-Star Weekend starring Jamie Foxx, Robert Downey Jr., Gerard Butler, and Benicio Del Toro, and Nine Bullets, starring Lena Heady and Sam Worthington.

His latest projects include the sound design for the movie Section Eight, featuring Mickey Rourke, Dolph Lundgren and Dermout Mulroney and directed by Christian Sesma.

== Early life ==
At the age of 5, Jeffery started taking piano lessons. In middle school he began taking percussion lessons in parallel. His debut into the music industry began in high school by forming a band called The Mana Rays. In the band he played the drums. The Mana Rays performed at parties and clubs across southern California. He continued to tour across the United States with several other bands.

He continued his education at California State University, Long Beach, where he received a bachelor's degree in Piano Performance and a master's degree in Music Composition. Jeffery furthered his education at UCLA and studied Film Scoring. He went on to graduate from the Dick Grove School of Music with a degree in Jazz Piano and Arranging.

While preparing for his college piano auditions he was involved in a near-death motorcycle accident in the Cayman Islands, which severed two tendons in his left wrist. It took over a year of recovery and rehabilitation.

== Awards & Honors ==
Action on Film International Film Festival, USA
2019	Action on Film Award	Best Sound Design
	Nominee	Sound (2019)

Bucharest ShortCut Cinefest
2019	August Award	Best Original Score
	Winner	Sound (2019)

FilmQuest
2014	FilmQuest Cthulhu	Best Sound
	Nominee	Echoes (2014)

Golden State Film Festival
2019	Golden State Film Festival Award	Best Sound Editing
	Winner	Sound (2019)

Hollywood Dreamz International Film Festival and Writers' Celebration
2019	Hollywood Dreamz International Film Festival Award	Best Sound Design
	Winner	Sound (2019)
2017	Jury Award	Best Sound Design
	Nominee	The Pitch (2013)

Independent Shorts Awards
2019	Platinum Award	Best Sound Design
	Winner	Sound (2019)
2019	Gold Award	Best Sound Design
	Nominee	Sound (2019)

IndieX Film Festival
2019	June Award	Best Sound Design
	Nominee	Sound (2019)

Kosice International Monthly Film Festival
2019	December Award	Best Sound Design
	Winner	Sound (2019)

Mindfield Film Festival Albuquerque
2019	Diamond Award	Best Sound Design
	Winner	Sound (2019)

Queen Palm International Film Festival
2019	Gold Award	Best Sound Design
	Winner	Sound (2019)
2019	Annual Queen Supreme "Best of Fest"	Best Sound Design
	Winner	Sound (2019)

Redline International Film Festival
2019	Festival Award	Best Sound Design
	Nominee	Sound (2019)

Short Stop International Film Festival
2019	Festival Award	Best Sound Design
	Winner	Sound (2019)

Swindon Independent Film Festival
2019	Best Sound Design Award	
	Winner	Sound (2019)

The Monthly Film Festival (TMFF)
2019	June Award	Original Score of the Month
	Winner	Sound (2019)

== Discography ==
As sound designer, re-recording mixer and/or supervising sound editor for Movies, TV Movies, TV Series, TV Series Shorts, Documentary's or Documentary Shorts he has over 250 credits. Jeffery is best known for The Survivalist (2021), Crown Vic (2019) and Bayou Caviar (2018).

He has composed and produced music for several albums. Including “Peace Poem,” a solo piano album, “Loves Never Been So Nice” with Dustin White and The Jeff Jones Trio, as well as 11 soundtrack albums including Most Beautiful Island, Crown Vic, and A Father's Legacy.
