= Richard Switzer =

American film producer (born 1995)

- Born: August 6, 1995 (age 31); Queens, New York, U.S.
- Occupation: Producer

Richard Switzer (born August 6, 1995) is an American film producer.

== Career ==
Switzer produced 3 feature films within 18 months of graduating high school, including the Lifetime Television film A Fatal Obsession, Buddy Hutchins starring Jamie Kennedy and Sally Kirkland, and After School Special, featuring Nick Swardson. He produced and/or executive produced a variety of action and family films including Altitude with Denise Richards and Dolph Lundgren, Isolation with Dominic Purcell and Arlo: The Burping Pig with Drake Bell and Joey Lawrence.

Switzer was an Executive Producer on Tragedy Girls, a comedy-horror film starring Alexandra Shipp, Brianna Hildebrand, Josh Hutcherson, Craig Robinson, and Kevin Durand. The film premiered at South by Southwest and was released by Gunpowder & Sky. He produced Black Water, an action-thriller film starring Jean-Claude Van Damme and Dolph Lundgren, released by Saban Films in North America, and premiering on 3,000 screens in China, grossing $8 million theatrically. In 2020, he produced Money Plane starring Adam Copeland, Kelsey Grammer, Thomas Jane and Denise Richards.

In 2020, Switzer directed his first movie "Friends Who Kill".

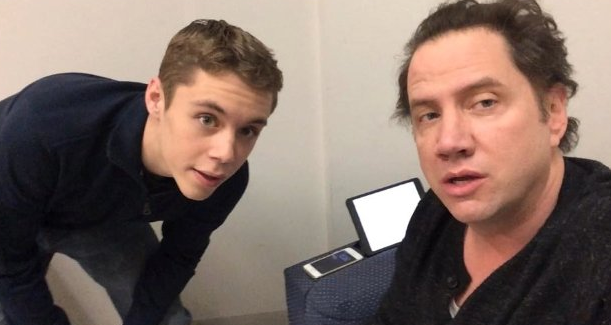
Richard Switzer and Jamie Kennedy on the set of Buddy Hutchins (2014)

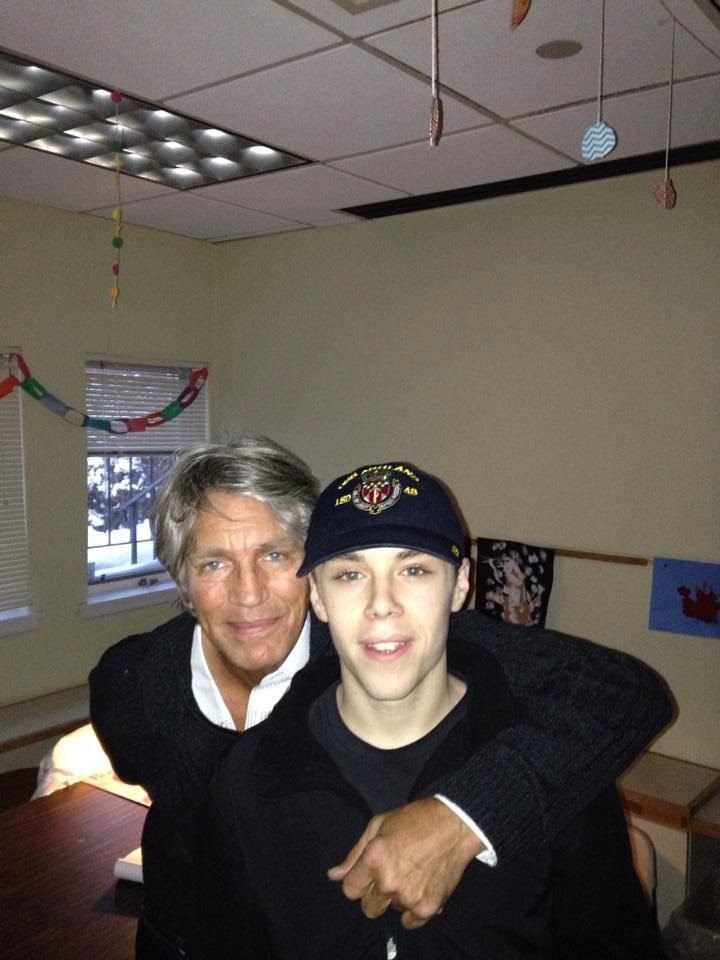
Eric Roberts with Richard Switzer on the set of A Fatal Obsession (2014)

== Filmography ==
- A Fatal Obsession (2014) – producer
- Buddy Hutchins (2014) – producer, Joel Hutchins
- School's Out (2015) – producer, Danny Kent
- The Assault (2015) – producer
- Isolation (2015) – executive producer
- My First Miracle (2015) – Co-Executive Producer
- Emma's Chance (2016) – executive producer
- Jack Goes Home (2015) – Co-Executive Producer
- Arlo: The Burping Pig (2016) – producer
- Altitude (2016) – producer
- Christmas All Over Again (2016) – producer
- Tragedy Girls (2017) – executive producer
- Black Water (2018) - Producer
- A Dangerous Date (2017) – producer
- A Mother's Worst Fear (2018) – producer
- Love on Repeat (2019) – producer
- In Bed With a Killer (2019) – producer
- Erasing His Dark Past (2019) – producer
- The Office Mix-Up (2019) – producer
- Agent Toby Barks (2020) – producer
- Final Kill (2020) – executive producer
- Friends Who Kill (2020) – director, producer
- Killer Competition (2020) – producer
- Money Plane (2020) – producer
- Red 48 (2020) – executive producer
- Deadly Radio Romance (2020) – producer
- Fatal Frenemies (2020) – director, producer
- The Survivalist (2020) – executive producer
- Panama (2020) – executive producer
- Sisters for Life (2020) – producer
- Hostage House (2020) – producer
- A Stepmother's Secret (2020) – director, producer
- High Heat (2020) – executive producer
