= List of video games based on DC Comics =

This is a list of video games based on DC Comics.

== Video games ==
=== 1970s–1980s ===
Title	Year	Platform(s)	Developer(s)	Publisher(s)
Superman	1979	Atari 2600	Atari, Inc.	Atari
Superman: The Game	1985	Acorn Electron, BBC Micro, Commodore 16, Commodore 64, Plus/4, ZX Spectrum	First Star	First Star, Prism Leisure
Batman	1986	Amstrad CPC, Amstrad PCW, MSX, ZX Spectrum,	Ocean	Ocean
Superman	1987	NES	Kemco	Kemco
Batman: The Caped Crusader	1988	Amiga, Amstrad CPC, Atari ST, Commodore 64, MS-DOS, ZX Spectrum	Special FX Software Ltd	Ocean
Superman	1988	Arcade	Taito	Taito
Superman: The Man of Steel	1989	Acorn Electron, Amiga, Amstrad CPC, Apple II, Atari ST, BBC Micro, Commodore 64, MS-DOS, MSX, ZX Spectrum	Tynesoft	Capstone
Batman	1989	Amiga, Atari ST, Commodore 64, Amstrad CPC, ZX Spectrum, MSX, MS-DOS, GX4000	Ocean	Ocean
Batman	1989	NES	Sunsoft	Sunsoft

=== 1990s ===
Title	Year	Platform(s)	Developer(s)	Publisher(s)
Batman	1990	Game Boy	Sunsoft	Sunsoft
Batman	1990	Genesis	Sunsoft	Sunsoft
Batman	1990	Arcade	Data East	Atari Games
Batman: Return of the Joker	1991	NES, Game Boy, Genesis	Ringler, Sunsoft	Sunsoft
The Flash	1991	Game Boy	Equilibrium Inc.	THQ
Superman	1992	Master System, Genesis, Game Gear	Sunsoft	Sunsoft
Swamp Thing	1992	NES, Game Boy	Imagineering	THQ
Batman Returns	1993	Amiga, Atari Lynx, Atari ST, MS-DOS, NES, Genesis, Sega CD, Game Gear, Master System, SNES	Acme, Aspect, Atari Games, Dentons, Konami, Malibu, Spirit of Discovery	Konami, Sega
The Flash	1993	Master System	Probe Software	Sega
Batman: The Animated Series	1993	Game Boy	Konami	Konami
The Death and Return of Superman	1994	SNES, Genesis	Blizzard Entertainment, Sunsoft	Sunsoft
The Adventures of Batman & Robin	1994	SNES, Genesis, Sega CD, Game Gear	Clockwork Tortoise, Konami, Novotrade	Konami, Sega
Batman Forever	1995	Windows, SNES, Game Boy, Genesis, Game Gear	Acclaim Entertainment, Probe Entertainment	Acclaim
Justice League Task Force	1995	Genesis, SNES	Blizzard Entertainment, Condor, Sunsoft	Acclaim
Batman Forever: The Arcade Game	1996	Arcade, Windows, PlayStation, Saturn	Iguana	Acclaim
Superman	1997	Game Boy	Titus	Acclaim
Batman & Robin	1998	PlayStation, Game.com	Probe Entertainment, Tiger Electronics	
Superman	1999	Nintendo 64	Titus	Titus
Catwoman	1999	Game Boy Color	Kemco	Kotobuki, Vatical Entertainment

=== 2000s ===
Title	Year	Platform(s)	Developer(s)	Publisher(s)
Batman Beyond: Return of the Joker	2000	PlayStation, Nintendo 64, Game Boy Color	Kemco	Ubisoft
Sgt. Rock On The Frontline	2000	Game Boy Color	Altron	BAM! Entertainment
Batman: Chaos in Gotham	2001	Game Boy Color	Backbone Entertainment	Ubisoft
Batman: Gotham City Racer	2001	PlayStation	Ubisoft	Ubisoft
Batman: Vengeance	2001	Windows, PlayStation 2, Xbox, GameCube, Game Boy Advance	Ubisoft Montreal, Ubisoft Shanghai	Ubisoft
Justice League: Injustice for All	2002	Game Boy Advance	Saffire	Midway Games
Superman: Shadow of Apokolips	2002	PlayStation 2, GameCube	Infogrames Entertainment, SA	Atari
Superman: The Man of Steel	2002	Xbox	Circus Freak	Atari
Batman: Dark Tomorrow	2003	Xbox, GameCube	HotGen	Kemco
Superman: Countdown to Apokolips	2003	Game Boy Advance	Mistic	Atari
Aquaman: Battle for Atlantis	2003	Xbox, GameCube	Lucky Chicken	TDK
Batman: Rise of Sin Tzu	2003	PlayStation 2, Xbox, GameCube, Game Boy Advance	Ubisoft Montreal	Ubisoft
Justice League: Chronicles	2003	Game Boy Advance	Full Fat	Midway Games
Catwoman	2004	Windows, PlayStation 2, Xbox, GameCube, Game Boy Advance	Argonaut Games, Electronic Arts, Magic Pockets	Electronic Arts
Constantine	2005	Windows, PlayStation 2, Xbox	Bits, SCi	THQ, Warner Bros. Interactive Entertainment
Batman Begins	2005	PlayStation 2, Xbox, GameCube, Game Boy Advance, mobile phones,	Eurocom	Electronic Arts, Warner Bros. Interactive Entertainment
Teen Titans	2006	PlayStation 2, Xbox, GameCube	Behaviour Interactive	THQ
Justice League Heroes	2006	PlayStation 2, PlayStation Portable, Xbox, Nintendo DS	Snowblind Studios	Eidos Interactive, Warner Bros. Interactive Entertainment
Justice League Heroes: The Flash	2006	Game Boy Advance	WayForward Technologies	Eidos Interactive, Warner Bros. Interactive Entertainment
Teen Titans	2006	Game Boy Advance	Behaviour Interactive	Majesco
Teen Titans 2	2006	Game Boy Advance	Behaviour Interactive	Majesco
Superman Returns	2006	PlayStation 2, PlayStation Portable, Xbox, Xbox 360, Nintendo DS	EA Tiburon	Electronic Arts
Superman Returns: Fortress of Solitude	2006	Game Boy Advance	EA Tiburon, Santa Cruz Games	Electronic Arts
Superman/Batman: Heroes United	2008	J2ME, Blackberry	Giu Mobile	Giu Mobile
Batman The Dark knight	2008	J2ME, BlackBerry, Windows Mobile	Giu Mobile	Giu Mobile
Lego Batman: The Videogame	2008	Windows, Mac OS X, PlayStation 2, PlayStation 3, PlayStation Portable, Xbox 360, Wii, Nintendo DS, mobile phones	Feral Interactive, Traveller's Tales, TT Fusion	Warner Bros. Interactive Entertainment
Mortal Kombat vs. DC Universe	2008	PlayStation 3, Xbox 360	Midway Games, Warner Bros. Interactive Entertainment	Midway
Watchmen: The End Is Nigh	2009	Windows, PlayStation 3, Xbox 360	Deadline Games	Warner Bros. Interactive Entertainment
Watchmen The Mobile Game	2009	BlackBerry, Mobile	Giu Mobile	Giu Mobile
Watchmen Justice Is Coming	2009	iOS	Last Legion Games, LLC	Warner Bros. Interactive Entertainment
Batman: Arkham Asylum	2009	Windows, Mac OS X, PlayStation 3, Xbox 360	Rocksteady Studios	Eidos Interactive, Warner Bros. Interactive Entertainment
Justice League Heroes United	2009	Arcade	Konami	Konami

=== 2010s ===
Title	Year	Platform(s)	Developer(s)	Publisher(s)
Batman Guardian Of Gotham	2010	BlackBerry	Giu Mobile	Giu Mobile
Batman: The Brave and the Bold – The Videogame	2010	Wii, Nintendo DS	WayForward Technologies	Warner Bros. Interactive Entertainment
DC Universe Online	2011	Windows, PlayStation 3, PlayStation 4, Xbox One	Sony Online Entertainment	Sony Online Entertainment, Warner Bros. Interactive Entertainment
Green Lantern: Rise of the Manhunters	2011	PlayStation 3, Xbox 360, Wii, NDS, Nintendo 3DS, iOS	Double Helix Games, Griptonite Games	Warner Bros. Interactive Entertainment
Batman: Arkham City	2011	Windows, Mac OS X, PlayStation 3, Xbox 360, Wii U	Rocksteady Studios	Warner Bros. Interactive Entertainment
Batman: Arkham City Lockdown	2011, 2013	iOS, Android	NetherRealm Studios	Warner Bros. Interactive Entertainment
Gotham City Impostors	2012	Windows, PlayStation 3, Xbox 360	Monolith Productions	Warner Bros. Interactive Entertainment
Lego Batman 2: DC Super Heroes	2012	Windows, Mac OS X, PlayStation 3, PlayStation Vita, Xbox 360, Wii, Wii U, Nintendo DS, 3DS, iOS	Traveller's Tales	Warner Bros. Interactive Entertainment
The Dark Knight Rises	2012	iOS, Android	Gameloft	Warner Bros. Interactive Entertainment
Justice League: Earth's Final Defense	2012	iOS, Android	Netmarble	Warner Bros. Interactive Entertainment
Injustice: Gods Among Us	2013	Windows, PlayStation 3, PlayStation 4, PlayStation Vita, Xbox 360, Wii U, iOS, Android	NetherRealm Studios	Warner Bros. Interactive Entertainment
The Wolf Among Us	2013	Windows, Mac OS X, PlayStation 3, PlayStation 4, PlayStation Vita, Xbox 360, Xbox One, iOS, Android	Telltale Games	Telltale Games
Man of Steel	2013	iOS, Android	Warner Bros. Interactive Entertainment	Warner Bros. Interactive Entertainment
Young Justice: Legacy	2013	Windows, PlayStation 3, Xbox 360, 3DS	Little Orbit	Warner Bros. Interactive Entertainment
Scribblenauts Unmasked: A DC Comics Adventure	2013	Windows, PlayStation 4, Xbox One, Wii U, 3DS, Nintendo Switch	5th Cell	Warner Bros. Interactive Entertainment
Batman: Arkham Origins	2013	Windows, PlayStation 3, Xbox 360, Wii U	WB Games Montréal	Warner Bros. Interactive Entertainment
Batman: Arkham Origins (mobile)	2013	iOS, Android	NetherRealm Studios	Warner Bros. Interactive Entertainment
Batman: Arkham Origins Blackgate	2013	PlayStation Vita, 3DS	Armature Studio	Warner Bros. Interactive Entertainment
Batman	2013	Arcade	Specular Interactive	Raw Thrills
Lego Batman 3: Beyond Gotham	2014	Windows, Mac OS X, PlayStation 3, PlayStation 4, PlayStation Vita, Xbox 360, Xbox One, Wii U, 3DS, iOS	Traveller's Tales	Warner Bros. Interactive Entertainment
Doodle Jump DC Super Heroes	2014	iOS, Android	Lima Sky LLC	Lima Sky LLC
Infinite Crisis	2015	Windows	Turbine, Inc.	Warner Bros. Interactive Entertainment
Batman: Arkham Knight	2015	Windows, PlayStation 4, Xbox One	Rocksteady Studios	Warner Bros. Interactive Entertainment
Lego Dimensions	2015	PlayStation 3, PlayStation 4, Xbox 360, Xbox One, Wii U	Traveller's Tales	Warner Bros. Interactive Entertainment
Batman V Superman: Who Will Win	2016	Android, iOS	Warner Bros. Interactive Entertainment	Warner Bros. Interactive Entertainment
Batman: Arkham Underworld	2016	Android, iOS	Turbine, Inc.	Warner Bros. Interactive Entertainment
Suicide Squad: Special Ops	2016	Windows, Mac OS X, Apple TV, iOS, Android	Sticky Studios	Warner Bros. Interactive Entertainment
Batman: Return to Arkham	2016	PlayStation 4, Xbox One	Virtuos	Warner Bros. Interactive Entertainment
Batman: The Telltale Series	2016	Windows, Mac OS X, PlayStation 3, PlayStation 4, PlayStation Vita, Xbox 360, Xbox One, Nintendo Switch, iOS, Android	Telltale Games	Telltale Games
Batman: Arkham VR	2016	PlayStation 4, Windows	Rocksteady Studios	Warner Bros. Interactive Entertainment
DC Legends	2016	Windows, iOS, Android	WB Games San Francisco	Warner Bros. Interactive Entertainment
Teeny Titans	2016	iOS, Android		Warner Bros. Interactive Entertainment
The Lego Batman Movie Game	2017	iOS, Android	Playside Studios	Warner Bros. Interactive Entertainment
Injustice 2	2017	Windows, PlayStation 4, Xbox One, Android	NetherRealm Studios	Warner Bros. Interactive Entertainment
Wonder Woman: Rise of the Warrior	2017	Windows, iOS, Android		Warner Bros. Interactive Entertainment
Batman: The Enemy Within	2017	Windows, Mac OS X, PlayStation 4, Xbox One, Nintendo Switch, iOS, Android	Telltale Games	Telltale Games
DC Unchained	2018	iOS, Android	FourThirtyThree Inc.	FourThirtyThree Inc.
Lego DC Super-Villains	2018	Windows, PlayStation 4, Xbox One, Nintendo Switch	Traveller's Tales	Warner Bros. Interactive Entertainment
Teen Titans GO Figure!	2018	iOS, Android	Grumpyface Studios	Cartoon Network
DC Super Hero Girls Blitz	2019	iOS, Android	Budge Studios	Budge Studios

=== 2020s ===
Title	Year	Platform(s)	Developer(s)	Publisher(s)
DC Battle Arena	2021	iOS, Android	Electronic Soul BBQ Studios	Electronic Soul BBQ Studios
DC Super Hero Girls: Teen Power	2021	Nintendo Switch	Toybox	Nintendo
DC Heroes and Villains	2022	iOS, Android	Ludia	Warner Bros. Interactive Entertainment
DC Worlds Collide	2022	iOS, Android	Nuverse	Warner Bros. Interactive Entertainment
DC League of Super-Pets: The Adventures of Krypto and Ace	2022	Windows, PlayStation 4, Xbox One, Xbox Series X/S, Nintendo Switch	PHL Collective	Outright Games
Gotham Knights	2022	Windows, PlayStation 5, Xbox Series X/S	WB Games Montréal	Warner Bros. Interactive Entertainment
Justice League: Cosmic Chaos	2023	Windows, PlayStation 4, PlayStation 5, Xbox One, Xbox Series X/S, Nintendo Switch	PHL Collective	Outright Games
DC Dual Force	2023	Windows	Cryptozoic Entertainment/CCG Lab	Yuke's
Suicide Squad: Kill the Justice League	2024	Windows, PlayStation 5, Xbox Series X/S	Rocksteady Studios	Warner Bros. Interactive Entertainment
Batman: Arkham Shadow	2024	Meta Quest 3, Meta Quest 3S	Camouflaj	Oculus Studios
DC Heroes United	2024	iOS, Android	Genvid Entertainment	Warner Bros. Interactive Entertainment
DC: Dark Legion	2025	iOS, Android, Windows	FunPlus	Warner Bros. Interactive Entertainment
Lego Batman: Legacy of the Dark Knight	2026	Windows, PlayStation 5, Xbox Series X/S, Nintendo Switch 2	Traveller's Tales	Warner Bros. Interactive Entertainment
Batman: Caped Crusader - Chronicles	2026	Amazon Luna	Amazon Game Studios	Warner Bros. Interactive Entertainment
Upcoming
The Wolf Among Us Remastered	2026	Windows, PlayStation 5, Xbox One, Xbox Series X/S, Nintendo Switch, Nintendo Switch 2	Telltale Games	Telltale Games
DCKO	2027	iOS, Android	Drop Fake, Inc.	Warner Bros. Interactive Entertainment
The Wolf Among Us 2	2027	Windows, PlayStation 5, Xbox One, Xbox Series X/S, Nintendo Switch, Nintendo Switch 2	Telltale Games	Telltale Games

== See also ==
- List of video games based on comics
- List of video games featuring Batman
- List of video games featuring Superman
- Marvel Games
