= Joker in other media =

Adaptation of DC character Joker in media

Adaptations of the Joker in other media
- Actors who have played the Joker. Top: Cesar Romero, Jack Nicholson, Mark Hamill (voice); Center: Heath Ledger, Jared Leto, Joaquin Phoenix; Bottom: Cameron Monaghan (as Jerome and Jeremiah Valeska).
- Original source: Comics published by DC Comics
- First appearance: Batman #1 (April 25, 1940)

Films and television
- Film(s): Batman (1966); Batman (1989); Batman: Mask of the Phantasm (1993); The Dark Knight (2008); Batman: The Killing Joke (2016); Suicide Squad (2016); The Lego Batman Movie (2017); Batman Ninja (2018); Joker (2019); Zack Snyder's Justice League (2021); Joker: Folie à Deux (2024)
- Television show(s): Batman (1966–68); Batman: The Animated Series (1992–95); The New Batman Adventures (1997–99); Justice League (2001–04); The Batman (2004–08); Batman: The Brave and the Bold (2008–2011); Gotham (2014–2019); Justice League Action (2016–18); Harley Quinn (2019–present); Batwoman (2019–2022)

The Joker, a supervillain in DC Comics and the archenemy of the superhero Batman, has been adapted in various forms of media. WorldCat (a catalog of libraries in 170 countries) records over 250 productions featuring the Joker as a subject, including films, television series, books, and video games. Live-action films featuring the character are typically the most successful.

The Joker has been portrayed by Cesar Romero in the 1966–1968 Batman television series and the 1966 Batman film; Jack Nicholson in the 1989 film Batman; Heath Ledger in the 2008 film The Dark Knight; Jared Leto in the 2016 film Suicide Squad and the 2021 director's cut Zack Snyder's Justice League; Cameron Monaghan in the Fox series Gotham; Joaquin Phoenix in the 2019 film Joker and the 2024 sequel Joker: Folie à Deux.

Ledger and Phoenix won the Academy Awards for Best Supporting Actor and Best Actor, respectively, for their performances, making the Joker one of the only three characters played by two actors to be awarded an Oscar for both portrayals (the others being Vito Corleone from The Godfather and Anita from West Side Story).

Mark Hamill, among others, has provided the Joker's voice in animation and video games.

== Television ==
=== Live-action ===
- The Joker appears in Batman (1966), portrayed by Cesar Romero whose moustache remained visible underneath his facial makeup as he refused to shave it for the role. This version is based on his comic book appearances in the 1960s as an elaborate prankster with a Vaudeville-esque sense of humor who wields harmless weapons.
- The Joker appears in the Batman OnStar commercial "Joker Face", portrayed by Curtis Armstrong.
- The Joker appears in Birds of Prey, portrayed by Roger Stoneburner and voiced by Mark Hamill.
- The Joker's mythology is explored in Gotham through twin brothers Jerome and Jeremiah Valeska, both portrayed by Cameron Monaghan. Believing that the Joker should not precede Batman, showrunner Bruno Heller initially did not want to use the character, but later decided to "scratch the surface" of his origin because "this is America — nobody wants to wait." Jerome is introduced in the first season as the mentally unhinged son of a nymphomaniac circus performer. Despite being killed at the start of the second season, he becomes a martyr for various Gothamites. While Monaghan was not comfortable drawing from the previous live-action actors who had played the Joker, he took influence from Mark Hamill in his performance as well as various comic books featuring the character. In the fourth and fifth seasons, Jeremiah was introduced, with the intention that he would represent different characteristics of the Joker. While it was never confirmed whether he would go on to become the Joker following the series finale, the DC FanDome documentary Joker: Put on a Happy Face included Jeremiah among the various iterations of the character adapted for film and television across his 80-year history.
- The Joker makes a cameo appearance in the Powerless episode "Wayne or Lose".
- The Joker makes cameo appearances in Titans, portrayed by Mustafa Bulut.
- The Joker appears in flashbacks depicted in the third season of Batwoman, portrayed by Nathan Dashwood. Similarly to Jack Nicholson's portrayal, this version's real name is "Jack Napier". Additionally, he was indirectly responsible for separating Kate Kane from her sister and mother, Beth and Gabrielle Kane, before Batman killed the Joker years prior. Before then, the latter exposed Marquis Jet (portrayed by Nick Creegan) to his joy buzzer, rendering him insane and leading to him attempting to continue the Joker's legacy in the present before he is defeated and has his sanity restored by Batwoman.
- The Joker appears in the Snickers commercial.
- The Joker appears in the State Farm commercial, including an extended cut released later.

=== Animation ===
- The Joker appears in The Adventures of Batman, voiced by Larry Storch.
- The Joker appears in The New Adventures of Batman, voiced by Lennie Weinrib.
- The Joker appears in The New Scooby-Doo Movies, voiced again by Larry Storch.
- The Joker appears in The Super Powers Team: Galactic Guardians episode "The Wild Cards", voiced by Frank Welker. Disguising himself as "Ace", he manipulates the Royal Flush Gang into helping him construct a portal to Apokolips before they are foiled and captured by Batman and Wonder Woman.
- The Joker appears in The Batman (2004), voiced by Kevin Michael Richardson. This version sports a pronounced pointed-jaw, green dreadlocks, red eyes, and black fingerless gloves along with a purple and yellow straitjacket in his initial appearances. Additionally, he is more reliant on physical combat than his comical gadgets, using his feet as dexterously as his hands to increase his mobility.
- The Joker, based on his Silver Age design as drawn by Dick Sprang, appears in Batman: The Brave and the Bold, voiced by Jeff Bennett. This version is a member of the Legion of Doom and the Jokers of All Nations who was inspired to pursue supervillainy by the Weeper. Additionally, a heroic alternate universe variant (loosely based on the Jester) utilized the Red Hood identity appears as well.
- The Joker appears in Young Justice, voiced by Brent Spiner. This version is a member of the Injustice League.
- The Joker appears in Robot Chicken, voiced by Mark Hamill in the episodes "But Not in That Way", "Catch Me If You Kangaroo Jack" and "Bugs Keith in: I Can't Call Heaven, Doug"; Aaron Paul in the Robot Chicken DC Comics Special via a deleted scene; and Giovanni Ribisi in Robot Chicken DC Comics Special 2: Villains in Paradise and Robot Chicken DC Comics Special III: Magical Friendship. This version is a member of the Legion of Doom.
- The Joker appears in Teen Titans Go!, voiced by Jason Spisak.
- The Joker appears in Justice League Action, voiced again by Mark Hamill.
- The Joker appears in the Scooby-Doo and Guess Who? episode "What a Night, For a Dark Knight!", voiced again by Mark Hamill.
- The Joker appears in Harley Quinn, voiced by Alan Tudyk. This version is a member of the Legion of Doom. Throughout the series, he seeks revenge on Harley Quinn for leaving him to become an independent supervillain and join the Legion. However, his efforts culminate in him being exposed to acid that renders him "normal". While recuperating, he falls in love with a nurse named Bethany, who he pursues a relationship with despite eventually being turned back into the Joker. He is later be elected mayor of Gotham City and attempts to reform, only to return to supervillainy with support from his step-family.
- The Joker appears in DC Super Hero Girls (2019), voiced by Jeremiah Watkins. This version is a teenager and inmate of the Arkham Reform School.
- The Joker appears in Batwheels, voiced by Mick Wingert. This version sports white makeup instead of bleached skin and is accompanied by his Jokermobile Prank (voiced by Griffin Burns).
- The Joker appears in Suicide Squad Isekai, voiced by Yūichirō Umehara in the Japanese version and Scott Gibbs in the English version.
- The Joker appears in Batman: Caped Crusader, voiced initially by an uncredited voice actor and subsequently by Matthew Needham. Unlike most versions, this Joker is German, rarely smiles, and is shown to have a calm demeanor. He also calls Batman “Brother”.
- The Joker makes cameo appearances in Kite Man: Hell Yeah!.
- The Merry Little Batman incarnation of Joker (see below) appears in Bat-Fam, voiced again by David Hornsby.
- The Joker will star in an upcoming anime series titled Joker: Laugh Riot.
- The Joker appears in the DC Nation Shorts episode "DC's World's Funnest", voiced by Jake Burgess Rollo.
- The Joker makes cameo appearances in The Simpsons.
- The Joker makes cameo appearances in South Park, in the three episodes from the Imaginationland story arc, based on Heath Ledger's portrayal.
- The Joker appears in the Zellers commercial.

==== DC Animated Universe ====
The Joker appears in series set in the DC Animated Universe (DCAU), voiced by Mark Hamill.

- The Joker first appears in Batman: The Animated Series (1992), which also introduced his sidekick and lover Harley Quinn.
- The Joker appears in The New Batman Adventures. Additionally, a 1950s-inspired incarnation of the Joker appears in the episode "Legends of the Dark Knight", voiced by Michael McKean.
- The Joker appears in the Superman: The Animated Series three-part episode "World's Finest". He tries to get Lex Luthor's money to eliminate Superman.
- The Joker appears in Justice League. In the two-part episode "Injustice for All", he joins Luthor's Injustice Gang. In the two-part episode "Wild Cards", he frees the Royal Flush Gang from Project Cadmus' custody and pits them against the Justice League. Furthermore, an alternate reality variant who had been lobotomized by the Justice Lords appears in the two-part episode "A Better World".
- The Joker appears in the Static Shock episode "The Big Leagues". He tries to recruit a young group of Bang Babies before he's defeated by Static.

== Film ==
=== Live-action ===
Barry Keoghan as the Joker, as he appears in a deleted scene from The Batman (2022).

- The Batman (1966) incarnation of the Joker appears in the film of the same name, portrayed again by Cesar Romero.
- The Joker appears in Batman (1989), portrayed by Jack Nicholson in the present and Hugo Blick in flashbacks. This version, previously known as Jack Napier, is a self-described "fully functional homicidal artist" who previously served as mob boss Carl Grissom's right hand and killed Bruce Wayne's parents Thomas and Martha Wayne years prior. While fighting Bruce as Batman in the present, Napier suffers a facial scar from a ricocheting bullet before falling into a vat of Axis Chemicals chemical waste, which turns his skin white, hair green, and lips red. Following a botched plastic surgery operation, Napier is left with a permanent rictus grin. Driven insane by his reflection, he becomes the Joker, kills Grissom, takes over his syndicate, and goes on a crime spree to "outdo" Batman, who he feels is getting too much press, in addition to seeking revenge on him for his disfigurement. Eventually, Bruce recognizes the Joker as his parents' killer and sends him falling to his death. The Newsweek review of the film stated that the best scenes are due to the surreal black comedy portrayed by the Joker. In 2003, American Film Institute ranked Nicholson's performance #45 on their list of 50 greatest film villains.
- A young Joker appears in flashbacks depicted in Batman Forever, portrayed by David U. Hodges.
- The Joker was meant to appear in Batman Unchained, with Jack Nicholson reprising the role, as part of a Scarecrow-induced hallucination. Additionally, Harley Quinn was to appear as his daughter who seeks revenge on Batman for killing him. Due to the critical and commercial failure of Batman & Robin, however, Batman Unchained was cancelled.
- The Joker appears in The Dark Knight, portrayed by Heath Ledger. This version is described as a "psychopathic, mass-murdering, schizophrenic clown with zero empathy" influenced by his depictions in Batman: The Killing Joke and Arkham Asylum: A Serious House on Serious Earth. Additionally, he sports smudged clown makeup that covers a Glasgow smile and embodies themes of chaos, anarchy, and obsession. As such, he expresses a desire to upset social order through crime and defines himself by his conflict with Batman. For his portrayal, Ledger drew on his past performances, such as in The Brothers Grimm, and referenced paintings by artist Francis Bacon, Anthony Burgess' novel A Clockwork Orange, and various punk rock musicians. Ledger's portrayal of the Joker is considered to be his finest performance, with Ledger himself regarding it as his most enjoyable. When the film was released in July 2008, six months after the actor had died from an accidental prescription drug overdose, the performance caused a sensation and received universal acclaim. Additionally, Ledger was posthumously awarded the Academy Award for Best Supporting Actor.
- The Joker appears in films set in the DC Extended Universe (DCEU), portrayed by Jared Leto.
  - He was originally set to appear in Batman v Superman: Dawn of Justice, but was ultimately cut.
  - The Joker first appears in Suicide Squad. While most of his scenes were cut and omitted from the theatrical release, most of them were later included in the extended cut. Mark Hamill, the voice of the Joker in various DC projects, said that he "loved" Leto's take on the character.
  - The Joker makes a non-speaking appearance in Birds of Prey via a prologue, in which his history with and separation from Harley Quinn is detailed; a flashback derived from archive footage; and Johnny Goth, who makes an uncredited appearance from behind in a separate flashback.
  - The Joker appears in Zack Snyder's Justice League via a post-apocalyptic premonition.
  - In 2018, a film featuring the Joker entered development, with Leto attached as an executive producer in addition to reprising his role as the title character and hiring the production crew. By February 2019, the film had been canceled and a separate Joker film unrelated to the DCEU (see below) was released later that year.
- The Joker appears in a self-titled film, portrayed by Joaquin Phoenix. This version is Arthur Fleck, a party clown and aspiring stand-up comedian who suffers from mental disorders and pseudobulbar affect that causes pathological laughter, idolizes late-night talk show host Murray Franklin, and lives with his delusional and abusive mother Penny in a recession-ridden Gotham City. After losing his job for bringing a gun to a children's hospital, Arthur kills three Wayne Enterprises employees in self-defense, sparking city-wide protests, and gradually descends into insanity. He later kills Penny and the colleague who gave him the gun before renaming himself Joker and appearing on Franklin's show, during which he rants about being disregarded by society and murders Franklin on live television. He is promptly arrested, but is rescued by protesters in clown masks and celebrated by them as a symbol. Prior to its release, in 2016, Todd Phillips began work on a standalone Joker film with the intent of launching a line of films unconnected to the DCEU called "DC Black". Development began in August 2017, with Philips attached to direct and cowrite with Scott Silver while Martin Scorsese was set to produce. Keanu Reeves was considered for the role of the character, but eventually turned it down because he noticed that the character had "too much dimension", and felt that he didn't want to portray a DC villain with face paint and hair dye in a film. For his performance Phoenix was awarded the Academy Award for Best Actor.
  - The Joker appears in Joker: Folie à Deux, portrayed again by Phoenix. Two years after the first film, Arthur is incarcerated at Arkham State Hospital while awaiting trial. During this time, he meets and falls in love with another patient named Harleen "Lee" Quinzel. However, various circumstances lead to him renouncing his Joker identity and confessing to his crimes before Lee leaves him and an unnamed inmate (portrayed by Connor Storrie) kills him and carves a Glasgow smile onto his own face.
- The Joker, based on Jack Nicholson's portrayal (see above), makes a cameo appearance in Space Jam: A New Legacy.
- The Joker makes a cameo appearance in The Batman (2022), portrayed by Barry Keoghan. This version is a patient at Arkham State Hospital who displays a permanent twisted smile, peeling skin, and a burned scalp with patches of hair. Director Matt Reeves described this iteration of the Joker as deformed from an early age like Joseph Merrick, the Phantom of the Opera, and Gwynplaine from The Man Who Laughs (1928) and adept at using other people's horror to his advantage. Makeup artist Mike Marino contributed to the characterization.

=== Animation ===
- The DCAU incarnation of the Joker appears in Batman: Mask of the Phantasm, voiced again by Mark Hamill. In flashbacks, it is revealed he previously worked as an enforcer for the Valestra mob before becoming a supervillain.
- The DCAU incarnation of the Joker appears in Batman Beyond: Return of the Joker (2000), voiced again by Mark Hamill. For this portrayal, his design resembles a combination of his appearances in Batman: The Animated Series and The New Batman Adventures. In flashbacks, he and Harley Quinn kidnapped and tortured Tim Drake for three weeks. All throughout, they rendered him insane, secretly implanted stolen Project Cadmus technology into him that contained the Joker's consciousness and DNA, turned him into a miniature version of the Joker, and learned Batman's secret identity. Batman and Batgirl eventually rescued Drake who killed the Joker during the ensuing struggle. Forty years later, the Cadmus technology is activated, allowing the Joker to possess Drake's body and resurface to terrorize Neo-Gotham. However, he is defeated by Batman II who fries the technology with the Joker's joy buzzer and frees Drake.
- The Batman (2004) incarnation of the Joker appears in The Batman vs. Dracula (2005), voiced again by Kevin Michael Richardson. After accidentally awakening Dracula, he is converted into a vampire. Despite retaining his original personality and free will, his bloodthirst leads to him raiding a blood bank until he is captured, eventually cured, and sent to Arkham Asylum by Batman.
- A heroic, alternate reality variant of the Joker called the Jester appears in Justice League: Crisis on Two Earths, voiced by James Patrick Stuart.
- The Joker / Red Hood appears in Batman: Under the Red Hood (2010), voiced by John DiMaggio.
- The Joker appears in DC Super Friends: The Joker's Playhouse (2010), voiced by John Kassir.
- The Joker appears in Batman: The Dark Knight Returns (2012–2013), voiced by Michael Emerson.
- The Joker appears in Lego Batman: The Movie – DC Super Heroes Unite (2013), voiced by Christopher Corey Smith.
- The Flashpoint incarnation of Martha Wayne / Joker makes a cameo appearance in Justice League: The Flashpoint Paradox, voiced by Grey DeLisle.
- The Joker makes a cameo appearance in Son of Batman (2014), voiced by Dee Bradley Baker.
- The Joker appears in Batman: Assault on Arkham (2014), voiced by Troy Baker.
- The Joker appears in Lego DC Comics: Batman Be-Leaguered (2014), voiced again by John DiMaggio.
- The Joker appears in the Batman Unlimited films Batman Unlimited: Monster Mayhem (2015) and Batman Unlimited: Mechs vs. Mutants (2016), voiced again by Troy Baker.
- The Joker appears in DC Super Friends (2015), voiced by Lloyd Floyd.
- The Joker appears in Lego DC Comics Super Heroes: Justice League – Attack of the Legion of Doom (2015), voiced again by John DiMaggio. This version is an aspiring member of the Legion of Doom.
- The Joker appears in Lego DC Comics Super Heroes: Justice League – Gotham City Breakout (2016), voiced by Jason Spisak.
- The Joker / Red Hood appears in Batman: The Killing Joke, voiced again by Mark Hamill.
- In 2016, comic book writer and Batman: The Killing Joke screenwriter Brian Azzarello expressed interest in adapting his graphic novel Joker into an animated film.
- The Batman (1966) incarnation of the Joker appears in Batman: Return of the Caped Crusaders (2016) and Batman vs. Two-Face (2017), voiced by Jeff Bergman.
- The Joker appears in The Lego Batman Movie (2017), voiced by Zach Galifianakis.
- The Joker appears in DC Super Heroes vs. Eagle Talon (2017), voiced by Ken Yasuda.
- The Joker appears in Scooby-Doo! & Batman: The Brave and the Bold (2018), voiced again by Jeff Bennett.
- The Joker makes a non-speaking cameo appearance in Teen Titans Go! To the Movies (2018).
- The Joker appears Lego DC Comics Super Heroes: The Flash (2018), voiced again by Jason Spisak.
- A Feudal Japan-inspired incarnation of the Joker appears in Batman Ninja (2018), voiced by Wataru Takagi in Japanese and Tony Hale in English.
- The Joker appears in Batman vs. Teenage Mutant Ninja Turtles (2019), voiced again by Troy Baker.
- The Joker appears in Batman: Hush (2019), voiced again by Jason Spisak.
- The Joker appears in Batman: Death in the Family (2020), voiced again by John DiMaggio.
- The Joker appears in Batman: The Long Halloween (2021), voiced again by Troy Baker.
- The Joker appears in Injustice (2021), voiced by Kevin Pollak.
- The Joker appears in Scooby-Doo! and Krypto, Too! (2023), voiced by Nolan North.
- The Joker appears in Merry Little Batman (2023), voiced by David Hornsby.
- The Joker appears in Justice League: Crisis on Infinite Earths – Part Two (2024), voiced again by Troy Baker.
- An alternate universe version of the Joker appears in Justice League: Crisis on Infinite Earths – Part Three (2024), voiced again by Mark Hamill.
- The Joker appears in Batman Ninja vs. Yakuza League (2025), voiced again by Wataru Takagi in Japanese and Scott Gibbs in English.
- A 16th-century Mesoamerican version of the Joker called Yoka appears in Aztec Batman: Clash of Empires (2025), voiced by Omar Chaparro in Spanish and Raymond Cruz in English.

== Internet ==
=== Animation ===
- The Joker appears in DC Kids official YouTube channel.
- The Joker appears in Imaginext official YouTube channel.
- The Joker appears in the Batman Black and White Motion Comic released on iTunes, voiced by Michael Dobson. It was produced in a motion comic format.
- The Joker appears in the short brickfilm Batman: New Times (2005), voiced again by Mark Hamill.

== Video games ==
"John Doe" in a promotional image for Batman: The Enemy Within.

The Joker as depicted in Mortal Kombat 11

- The Joker appears in Batman: The Caped Crusader (1988).
- The Joker, based on Jack Nicholson's portrayal, appears in the Batman (1989) tie-in game.
- The Joker, based on Jack Nicholson's portrayal, appears in Batman: The Video Game.
- The Joker, based on Jack Nicholson's portrayal, appears in Batman (1990) for the Sega Genesis.
- The Joker, based on Jack Nicholson's portrayal, appears in the Batman (1990) arcade game.
- The Joker appears in Batman: Return of the Joker (1991).
- The Joker, based on the DCAU incarnation, appears in Batman: The Animated Series (1993).
- The Joker, based on the DCAU incarnation, appears in The Adventures of Batman & Robin.
- The Joker, based on the DCAU incarnation, appears in Batman Beyond: Return of the Joker (2000).
- The Joker appears in Batman: Vengeance (2001), voiced again by Mark Hamill.
- The Joker appears in Batman: Chaos in Gotham (2001).
- The Joker appears in Justice League: Injustice for All (2002) as a member of the Injustice Gang.
- The Joker appears in Batman: Dark Tomorrow (2003), voiced by Allen Enlow.
- The Joker makes a cameo appearance in Batman: Rise of Sin Tzu (2003).
- The Joker appears as a playable character in Mortal Kombat vs. DC Universe (2008), voiced by Richard Epcar.
- The Joker appears in DC Universe Online (2011), voiced again by Mark Hamill. This version is a leading member of the Secret Society.
- The Joker appears as a character summon in Scribblenauts Unmasked: A DC Comics Adventure (2013).
- The Joker appears as a playable character in Injustice: Gods Among Us (2013), voiced again by Richard Epcar. Additionally, an alternate universe variant of the Joker who tricked Superman into killing Lois Lane and their unborn child and destroying Metropolis, for which he was killed by Superman, appears as well.
- The Joker appears in Batman (2013), voiced by Dave B. Mitchell.
- The Joker appears as an alternate skin in Infinite Crisis (2014), voiced again by Richard Epcar.
- The Joker appears as a playable character in Arena of Valor (2016).
- The Joker, initially referred to as "John Doe", appears in Batman: The Telltale Series (2016), voiced by Anthony Ingruber. This version is a patient at Arkham Asylum who provides Bruce Wayne with information regarding the Children of Arkham's attacks on Gotham City.
- The Joker appears as a playable character in Injustice 2 (2017), voiced again by Richard Epcar.
- The Joker appears as a playable character in SINoALICE (2017), voiced again by Wataru Takagi.
- John Doe / the Joker appears in Batman: The Enemy Within (2017), voiced again by Anthony Ingruber. After being discharged from Arkham, he and his former psychiatrist Harley Quinn joined a criminal cabal called the "Pact".
- The Joker appears as an alternate skin in Fortnite (2017).
- The Joker appears as a downloadable playable character in Mortal Kombat 11 (2019), voiced again by Richard Epcar.
- The Joker appears as a playable character in MultiVersus, voiced again by Mark Hamill.
- The Joker appears in DC: Dark Legion, voiced by J. P. Karliak.

=== Lego Batman ===
- The Joker appears as a playable character in Lego Batman: The Videogame (2008), voiced by Steve Blum.
- The Joker appears as an optional boss and unlockable playable character in Lego Batman 2: DC Super Heroes (2012), voiced by Christopher Corey Smith.
- The Joker appears in Lego Batman 3: Beyond Gotham (2014), voiced again by Christopher Corey Smith. This version is a member of the Legion of Doom.
- The Joker appears as a playable character in Lego Dimensions (2015), voiced again by Christopher Corey Smith. This version is a member of Lord Vortech's army. Additionally, The Lego Batman Movie incarnation appears in the associated DLC, voiced by Dave Wittenberg.
- The Joker appears as a playable character in Lego DC Super-Villains (2018), voiced again by Mark Hamill. This version is a member of the Legion of Doom. Additionally, the DCAU incarnation of the Joker appears as a playable character via and the final boss of the Batman: The Animated Series DLC pack.
- The Joker appears in Lego Batman: Legacy of the Dark Knight (2026), voiced by Ewan Bailey. His appearance is initially based on the Jack Napier version from the 1989 film before later resembling Heath Ledger's portrayal in the Dark Knight trilogy.

=== Batman: Arkham ===
Mark Hamill reprises his role as the Joker in the main trilogy of the Batman: Arkham franchise while Troy Baker voices a younger version in the prequels Arkham Origins, Origins Blackgate, and Arkham Shadow. This depiction of the Joker has received widespread acclaim as critics have lauded the voice acting and the exploration of his rivalry with Batman. In 2011, the Joker won the Spike Video Game Awards' "Character of the Year" award for his role in Arkham City.

- First appearing as the final boss of Batman: Arkham Asylum (2009), the Joker takes over Arkham Island to work on the "Titan formula", a more potent version of Bane's Venom drug, to create an army of genetically enhanced henchmen before using it on himself, only to be defeated by Batman. Additionally, the Joker appears as a playable character via the Challenge Maps.
- In Batman: Arkham City (2011), the Joker is transferred to the eponymous city prison, where he becomes embroiled in a gang war with Two-Face and the Penguin. After discovering he is slowly dying due to the Titan formula, he infects Batman and several Gotham City citizens with his infected blood to force him to help find a cure. Despite Batman's best efforts, the Joker ultimately succumbs to the disease.
- A young Joker appears in Batman: Arkham Origins (2013), in which he kidnaps and poses as Black Mask to hire eight assassins to kill Batman and later has his first encounter with the latter in addition to Dr. Harleen Quinzel. Additionally, the Joker appears as a playable character via the game's multiplayer mode.
  - The Joker appears in Batman: Arkham Origins Blackgate (2013).
- In Batman: Arkham Knight (2015), the Joker manifests as a split personality within Batman and four civilians, Henry Adams, Johnny Charisma, Christina Bell, and Albert King, due to residual traces of the Joker's blood within their bodily systems, with Batman additionally seeing hallucinations of the Joker due to exposure to the Scarecrow's new fear toxin while the civilians all take on aspects of the Joker's personality and appearance. Upon realizing Batman will become the best host for the Joker's return, Adams kills the other infected and himself. Eventually, Batman overcomes the Joker personality and locks him within his mind.
- The Joker makes a cameo appearance in Batman: Arkham VR (2016) via a nightmare sequence.
- An alternate reality variant of the Joker appears as a downloadable playable character in Suicide Squad: Kill the Justice League, voiced by J. P. Karliak. This version is a former member of his universe's Suicide Squad, who were killed by Brainiac, and sports a prosthetic leg and rocket-powered umbrella.
- The Joker makes a vocal cameo appearance in Batman: Arkham Shadow (2024). Six months after the events of Origins, the Joker has been placed in solitary confinement in Blackgate Penitentiary before eventually escaping with Harleen Quinzel's help.

== Miscellaneous ==
- The Joker appears in Batman Live, portrayed by Mark Frost.
- The Dark Knight incarnation of the Joker appears in The Dark Knight Coaster, voiced by Heath Ledger.
- The Joker appears in Justice League: Battle for Metropolis, voiced by Troy Baker.
- The Joker appears in Six Flags Magic Mountain's DC Heroes & Villains Fest.
- The Joker serves as inspiration for "The Joker Funhouse" interactive walkthrough attraction, voiced by Richard Epcar.
- The Joker appears as a meet-and-greet character at Warner Bros. Movie World.
- The Joker serves as inspiration for the DC Rivals HyperCoaster.
- The DCAU incarnation of the Joker appears in flashbacks in the tie-in comic Justice League Beyond. Following his death during the flashbacks in Batman Beyond: Return of the Joker, Batman and Commissioner Jim Gordon see his body buried underneath Arkham Asylum.
- The Injustice incarnation of the Joker appears in the Injustice: Gods Among Us tie-in comic. Prior to tricking Superman into killing Lois Lane and her unborn child and destroying Metropolis, the Joker and Harley Quinn murdered Jimmy Olsen, stole a nuclear warhead, connected it to a dead man's switch and Lane's pulse, and exposed Superman to Kryptonite-laced fear toxin they stole from the Scarecrow. Years after Superman killed the Joker and formed the Regime, a group inspired by the latter called the Joker Underground emerge to oppose Superman. While Batwoman and Harley provide assistance to the group, Superman slaughters them. Nonetheless, more people are inspired by the Joker while an alternate universe variant arrives to co-opt the Joker Underground later in the series.
- An alternate reality variant of the Joker appears in Smallville: Alien #3. This version is the Batman of Earth-13.
- The DCEU incarnation of the Joker appears in the music video for Skrillex and Rick Ross' "Purple Lamborghini", portrayed again by Jared Leto.
- The Joker appears in DC X Sonic the Hedgehog #3.

== Actors ==
Actor	Live-action television	Live-action film	Records	Animated television	Radio	Animated film	Video games	Live performance	Web series	Podcasts	Short film
Caesar Romero	1966–1968	1966	1966^{V}								
Lennie Weinrib				1977^{V}							
Jack Nicholson		1989									
Kerry Shale					1989^{V}						
Mark Hamill	2002^{V}			1992–2018^{V}		1993–2024^{V}	1994–2024^{V}				2005
Kevin Michael Richardson				2004–2008^{V}		2005^{V}					
Heath Ledger		2008									
Jeff Bennett				2008–2011^{V}		2018^{V}					
Michael Dobson									2008–2009^{V}		
Andrew Koenig											2010
Mark Frost								2011, 2012			
Brent Spiner				2011, 2021^{V}						2021–2022^{V}	
Troy Baker				2015^{V}		2014–2024^{V}	2013, 2024^{V}		2015^{V}		
Jeff Bergman						2016–2017^{V}					
Jared Leto		2016, 2021									
David Howard Thornton									2016–2017		2025
Joaquin Phoenix		2019, 2024									
Alan Tudyk				2019–present^{V}							
Barry Keoghan		2022–present									
J. P. Karliak							2024–present^{V}				
Omar Chaparro						2025^{V}					
