= Batman Returns (NES video game) =

1993 video game

- North American box art
- Developer: Konami
- Publisher: Konami
- Producer: Kuniaki Kinoshita
- Designer: Teisaku Seki
- Programmer: Toshiki Yamamura
- Composers: Shigemasa Matsuo; Takashi Tateishi
- Series: Batman
- Platform: Nintendo Entertainment System
- Release: NA: January 1993; EU: May 1993
- Genre: Beat 'em up
- Mode: Single-player

Batman Returns is a 1993 beat 'em up video game developed and published by Konami for the Nintendo Entertainment System. Based on the DC Comics superhero Batman, it is inspired by the Warner Bros.'s 1992 film of the same name. In the main storyline, Batman must confront both Catwoman and the Penguin.

Batman Returns on the NES was produced by Kuniaki Kinoshita and designed by Teisaku Seki, who had worked on Lagrange Point (1991). The music was scored by Shigemasa Matsuo and Takashi Tateishi, best known for his work in Mega Man 2. The game garnered average reception from critics, whom praised the soundtrack but most were divided regarding the visuals, controls, and gameplay.

== Gameplay ==
Gameplay screenshot

Batman Returns on the Nintendo Entertainment System is a side-scrolling beat 'em up game similar to the Double Dragon and Teenage Mutant Ninja Turtles series, where players take control of Batman fighting against multiple adversaries such as the Red Triangle Gang in order to stop Catwoman and the Penguin from spreading terror across Gotham City. The game takes the player through six stages featured in the film, each one having a boss fight that Batman must defeat to proceed into the next stage.

Batman has a number of weapons and moves at his disposal, including the batarang. The player only has one life bar, which can be expanded through health packs. Various members of the Red Triangle Circus Gang attack Batman throughout each stage in the game. There are also two side-scrolling racing levels in which the player controls the Batmobile and the Batskiboat. It uses a password-save system.

== Development and release ==
Batman Returns on the Nintendo Entertainment System was developed by Konami, based on Warner Bros.'s 1992 film of the same name. It was produced by Kuniaki "Mozart" Kinoshita. Teisaku "Bun-Saku" Seki, who had worked on Lagrange Point (1991), served as the game's main designer along with a co-designer under the pseudonym "123 Kikkawa". Toshiki "Two-Face" Yamamura acted as main programmer alongside co-programmer Yuichi "Zap" Ueda. The soundtrack was composed by Shigemasa Matsuo and Takashi Tateishi (best known for his work in Mega Man 2). In a 1993 interview with Super Play, Kinoshita explained that the creation process for a game idea based on a license such as Batman or the Teenage Mutant Ninja Turtles is decided by the management at Konami. The game was first published in North America in January 1993, and later in Europe in May of the same year.

== Reception ==
Reception

Review scores
Publication	Score
AllGame	3/5
Electronic Gaming Monthly	5/10, 7/10, 6/10, 6/10
Joypad	60%
Official Nintendo Magazine	74/100
Player One	56%
Total!	48% (UK); 3 (DE)
Electronic Games	85%
Game Power	9/10
Megablast	72%
Super Gamer	76%
VideoGames	7/10

Batman Returns on the Nintendo Entertainment System garnered average reception from critics. Electronic Gaming Monthly's four reviewers criticized the game's outdated visuals and sound, but felt that the Batmobile and Batskiboat sequences added variety to the linear and repetitive gameplay. GamePro's Matt Taylor said that while the graphics were "sharp and distinct", they were "not even close to an 8-bit masterpiece", and felt that the audio "could be from any Konami action game". Electronic Games' Danyon Carpenter praised the game's well drawn stages, cutscenes, catchy music, controls, character interactions, and password system.

VideoGames' Zach Meston said that while the game's graphics matched the film's cinematography, the soundscapes were forgettable. Meston expressed disappointment with Konami for not taking a fresh gameplay approach, suggesting Batman: Return of the Joker instead. Eddy Lawrence and Tim Boone of Nintendo Magazine System (Official Nintendo Magazine) considered it a fun game and commended its presentation, soundtrack, and longevity, but felt the password system made it easier to finish. They also criticized the overall graphical department, lack of options, and slow playability. Game Power's Marjorie Bros. lauded the game's varied action, stages, and visuals, regarding it as "An example for all the other companies that stopped releasing good games for NES".

Total!'s Julian Eggebrecht called it a solid game and praised its audiovisual presentation for making good use of the NES hardware, but criticized its unfair action, lengthy stages, and limited number of on-screen enemies. Joypad's Jean-François Morisse highlighted the music as the game's strongest feature, but nevertheless faulted its linear nature, strange use of colors, flickering sprites, and controls. Player One's Olivier Scamps compared it unfavorably with its Super NES counterpart, criticizing its aggressive color palette and flickering sprites. Scamps also added that the previous Batman titles on NES had more class.

Megablast's Michael Schnelle commended the game's controls, but stated that the "run-of-the-mill graphics and the drumming sound won't knock a bat off the ceiling". Super Gamer said that the game was a "Better than average beat-'em'-up which follow the film closely". AllGame's Skyler Miller gave the game favorable remarks for its above average graphics, soundtrack, enemy variety, and Batmobile and Batskiboat sequences, but noted that the Double Dragon-style gameplay can become repetitive. Hardcore Gaming 101's Robert Naytor opined that both the NES and SNES versions were fine on their own, but said that "the fact that the NES version is quite a bit easier may make some people lean one way or the other. Either way, however, it's still a pretty fun game, as opposed to a lot of the many, many inferior game tie-ins the movie actually got".
