= The Adventures of Batman & Robin (video game) =

- North American SNES box art
- Developers: Konami (SNES); Clockwork Tortoise (Sega CD, Genesis); Novotrade (Game Gear)
- Publishers: Konami (SNES); Sega (Sega versions)
- Writer: Paul Dini (Sega CD)
- Composers: Jesper Kyd (Genesis); Spencer Nilsen (Sega CD)
- Series: Batman
- Platforms: SNES, Sega CD, Sega Genesis, Game Gear
- Release: December 1994: Super NES; NA: December 1994; EU: November 1994 SegaCD/Mega-CD; NA: 1995; EU: December 1995 Genesis/Mega Drive; NA: May 1995; EU: July 14, 1995 Game Gear; NA: June 1995; EU: 1995
- Genres: Action, platformer (SNES, Game Gear); Vehicular combat (Sega CD); Run and gun (Genesis)
- Modes: Single-player, multiplayer

The Adventures of Batman & Robin is a series of video game adaptations released between 1994 and 1995 featuring the DC Comics characters Batman and Robin, based on Batman: The Animated Series (which had been retitled The Adventures of Batman and Robin for its second season). The games were released for numerous platforms, with the Genesis, Game Gear, and Sega CD versions published by Sega, while the Super NES version was published by Konami (who also produced an earlier Game Boy video game based on the show).

== Gameplay ==
The Joker is the first villain in the SNES version of The Adventures of Batman & Robin.

=== Super NES ===
The Super NES version was developed and published in December 1994 by Konami, and draws inspiration from the Batman: The Animated Series TV show. The game is a 2D platformer where the player guides Batman across eight levels. Batman can attack, dodge, and block attacks. Among Batman's gear are batarangs, a grappling hook, and a limited set of additional equipment, including throwing stars and smoke bombs. Some stages necessitate the use of items like flashlights, x-ray glasses, and gas masks. The game's graphics maintain the art deco influence of the series.

=== Sega Genesis ===
Released by Sega in 1995, the Sega Genesis edition was developed by Clockwork Tortoise. The gameplay leans towards a "run-and-gun" style reminiscent of the previously released game, Revenge of the Joker. Levels incorporate new episodes like a stage featuring the Mad Hatter. A feature of this version is the co-op mode, where Batman and Robin can team up for combined action, which is not available in the Super NES version. The plot revolves around Mr. Freeze's scheme to freeze Gotham, having liberated villains such as Joker, Two-Face, and Mad Hatter from prison to thwart Batman's attempts to stop Freeze.

=== Sega CD ===
For the Sega CD platform, the Batman game presents a distinct gameplay style that diverges from its predecessors' typical approach. Specifically for the Sega CD platform, a racing mode was conceived, allowing players to drive the Batmobile. In this mode, players navigate urban obstacles and pursue antagonists like Poison Ivy, Riddler, and Joker. Throughout the game, players confront various enemies, either dodging them or taking them down. The gameplay is divided between six acts, culminating in a mission pursuing Clayface in the Batwing. Additionally, the game features 15 minutes of narrative animated sequences, drawn by the animators of Batman: The Animated Series; the voice cast of the show reprise their roles for the game.

=== Game Gear ===
The Game Gear version was developed by Novotrade and published by Sega. The Joker has assembled a gang of old Batman foes and kidnapped Robin, and the Batman has to go save him. There are four different levels, each with 2 or 3 stages, where Batman runs around beating up thugs and jumping between platforms before taking on a boss. Each stage ends with a boss encounter – some generic machine or thug in the early stages, and a classic Batman villain at the final stage of the level. The four levels takes Batman through a theater where he takes on the Mad Hatter, a frozen office building where he takes on Mr. Freeze, a graveyard where he takes on the Scarecrow, and finally an amusement park where he takes on Harley Quinn and the Joker.

Batman typically fights with projectile attacks – he has an unlimited supply of batarangs, but can pick up other weapons with limited ammunition in small item boxes along the way. They are all more powerful than the batarangs. Once Batman gets close to an enemy, he will switch to melee attacks, which deal more damage than the projectiles. Batman can make several types of jumps, both upwards and sideways. Pressing the jump button twice does a double jump. Batman starts out with 9 extra lives, and instantly respawns where he died after losing one, with a full health bar, all ammunition intact, and all inflicted damage and defeated enemies accounted for. There are also multiple extra lives and life bar refill items spread around on the stages. The game has infinite continues and a password system, allowing the player to start over from any previously reached stage. The only punishment for having to continue is that the player's score is reset to zero, encouraging full playthroughs without continuing.

== Reception ==
Reception

Review scores
Publication	Score		
Publication	Game Gear	Sega Genesis	SNES
AllGame	N/A	2.5/5	4.5/5
Computer and Video Games	N/A	N/A	91/100
Electronic Gaming Monthly	25.5/40	27.5/40; 6.5/10, 5/10, 8/10, 6.5/10 (CD)	N/A
Game Players	N/A	43% 66%	80%
GameFan	N/A	238/300	285/300
GamePro	10.5/20	13/20; 9/20 (CD)	17.5/20
HobbyConsolas	75/100	N/A	N/A
Jeuxvideo.com	N/A	N/A	17/20
Joypad	82%	85%	N/A
M! Games	N/A	68%	N/A
Mean Machines Sega	N/A	87/100	N/A
Mega Fun	N/A	65%	73%
Next Generation	N/A	1/5; 2/5 (CD)	3/5
Nintendo Power	N/A	N/A	14.3/20
Official Nintendo Magazine	N/A	N/A	92/100
Player One	82%	N/A	N/A
Super Game Power	N/A	3.5/5	N/A
Total!	N/A	N/A	89/100
Video Games (DE)	N/A	85%	69%
Sega Magazine	N/A	82/100	N/A

Reviewing the Super NES version, GamePro's Bacon praised the game's often brain-teasing challenges, strong graphics and sound effects, and "eerie atmosphere". Though he criticized the fact that Robin appears only in cutscenes, the "vapid" dialogue, and the poor graphics and controls of the Batmobile stages, he concluded that "the tame fighting and intricate challenges in The Adventures of Batman and Robin should please thoughtful action/adventure fans, but its beautiful graphics and supernatural sounds will impress anyone". Nintendo Power also criticised the game for not giving Robin a more active role (although the game was actually under development before the series was retitled between seasons). Next Generation reviewed the SNES version of the game, rating it three stars out of five. The magazine praised the game's diversity but noted that the slow-moving character can make it difficult to pull off quick jumps or attacks. In addition, the magazine said that the several levels with various difficulty make the game too easy or hard.

A reviewer for Next Generation gave the Genesis version one out of five stars, citing its generic side-scrolling platform gameplay and failure to recreate the look of the TV show. Scary Larry of GamePro called the Genesis version "a standard side-scrolling platform game with great backgrounds from the show but mediocre action", citing tedious and overly difficult level design, unresponsive controls, poor character visuals, and repetitive music. The four reviewers of Electronic Gaming Monthly gave it a 6.875 out of 10, remarking that the graphics and sounds are excellent, but the action is simplistic, repetitive, and overly difficult due to the large numbers of enemies attacking all at once.

While noting that it has a more diverse selection of weapons than the Genesis version, Scary Larry said that the Game Gear version is likewise "predictable side-scrolling action". He also criticized the music as "annoying and repetitive". The four reviewers of Electronic Gaming Monthly gave it a 6.375 out of 10. They said it has good cartoon-style graphics and level design, but that the screen blurs when moving and enemies frequently fire bullets from off-screen which the player has no time to react to, both of which make the game unfairly difficult. Al Manuel went so far as to say that it was "probably the hardest game I have ever played".

The four reviewers of Electronic Gaming Monthly commented that while the FMV cutscenes in the Sega CD version are entertaining, the gameplay is repetitive and frustrating due to trees and other objects blocking the player's view of the road. One of them summarized the game as "a CD full of cartoon episodes with a so-so driving game included to break up the animated sequences". Tommy Glide of GamePro particularly criticized the lack of variety in the gameplay, commenting that "this barely average driving game should be called "The Adventures of the Batmobile". A reviewer for Next Generation likewise regarded the rudimentary and repetitive gameplay to be the game's main flaw. Calling it "a journey into sheer tedium, boring yet frustrating at the same time", he scored it two out of five stars. IGN ranked the game #94 on its "Top 100 SNES Games of All Time". In 2018, Complex listed the game 45th in their "The Best Super Nintendo Games of All Time". They praised the game that it did the cartoon justice and called the game superb.

== See also ==
- List of Batman video games
