= Batman Forever (video game) =

1995 video game

- Developer: Probe Entertainment
- Publisher: Acclaim Entertainment
- Director: Fiona Milburn
- Producer: Douglas Yellin
- Designer: Nick Baynes
- Programmers: List: SNES; Dan Phillips; Genesis/Mega Drive; Paul Carruthers; MS-DOS; Brian O'Shaughnessy
- Composers: Tim Follin; Andrew Brock; Geoff Follin; MS-DOS; Stephen Root; Andrew Brock
- Series: Batman
- Engine: Mortal Kombat II
- Platforms: Super NES, Game Boy, Game Gear, Genesis/Mega Drive, R-Zone, MS-DOS, Windows
- Release: September 7, 1995: SNES, Game Boy, Game Gear, Genesis/Mega Drive; NA/EU: September 7, 1995; JP: October 27, 1995 R-Zone; NA: 1995; EU: 1995 MS-DOS, Windows; NA: 1996; EU: 1996
- Genre: Beat 'em up
- Modes: Single-player; Co-op (Genesis, MS-DOS, SNES)

Batman Forever is a 1995 beat 'em up video game based on the film of the same name. Though released by the same publisher at roughly the same time, it is an entirely different game from Batman Forever: The Arcade Game. It was followed by Batman & Robin in 1998.

== Gameplay ==
The player plays as either Batman or Robin. There is also a fighting game mode called "training mode" where the player can play as Batman, Robin, or any of the enemies found throughout the game against either a computer-controlled opponent, against a second player, or cooperatively against two computer opponents.

The controls are largely based on move lists and key sequences. Some gadget moves involve moving away from the enemy right before pressing a punch or kick button.

The gadget list is selected by the player at each level, with three standard gadgets for each character and two gadgets selected from a list. There are also four hidden "blueprint" gadgets.

There are two kinds of co-op modes in Batman Forever. Players chose between Batman or Robin. In one mode, Batman and Robin work together and cannot harm each other, although they share credits. In another mode, however, Batman and Robin can attack each other, but still need to look out for enemies and have separate credit counts. The co-op mode is not included in the Game Boy and Game Gear versions.

=== Version differences ===
The Super NES and Genesis/Mega Drive versions of the game are very similar. The PC version is the same as the SNES and Genesis versions, though Batman and Robin appear in their movie attire, but the PC version also has loading delays. The Game Boy and Game Gear versions do away with a majority of the puzzle-solving of the SNES, PC, and Genesis versions and opt for a more traditional platform fighting game.

== Development ==
Acclaim used motion capture technology to animate the digitized sprites, similar to what was done with Mortal Kombat. Warner Bros. acquired Acclaim's motion capture technology for the film before Acclaim used it for the game.

== Reception ==
Reception

Review scores
Publication	Score
AllGame	2/5 (GEN); 1.5/5 (GG)
Computer Game Review	70/100 (PC)
Electronic Gaming Monthly	6.25/10 (GG)
Famitsu	5/10, 5/10, 5/10, 5/10 (SNES) 6/10, 6/10, 5/10, 4/10 (GEN) 4/10, 3/10, 4/10, 4/10 (GB) 5/10, 4/10, 5/10, 4/10 (GG)
HobbyConsolas	83/100 (GEN); 90/100 (SNES)

The four reviewers of Electronic Gaming Monthly praised the Game Gear version as having graphics that are virtually identical to those of the Genesis and Super NES version, but overall dismissed the game due to poor controls, explaining that "Punching enemies is nothing more than a delayed sequence that continues well after the enemy is dead." GamePro also gave it a negative review. They remarked that the graphics are technically impressive but dull due to their lack of onscreen objects and interesting backgrounds, and concluded that "the sluggish gameplay, mediocre graphics, and weak sounds really kick this cart to the bat curb."

GamePro panned the Super NES version as the worst of the Super NES Batman games. They dismissed the training mode as lacking the winning elements of a decent fighting game. Commenting on the normal mode, they criticized the frustrating difficulty, particularly the lack of continues and the time limit in the third stage, and stated that the digitized sprites were done well but clash with the "washed-out" background graphics. Next Generation praised the look of the digitized sprites but gave the game one out of five stars, citing boring gameplay and a poor control configuration. Frank Snyder of Computer Game Review wrote that "the actual experience of playing Batman™ Forever isn't much better than that of watching the movie."

Batman Forever was a major commercial failure.
