= List of video games featuring Batman =

The list of video games featuring Batman encompasses computer, mobile phone, and console systems since the 1980s, where Batman from DC Comics has any role appearances.

== Standalone games ==
| Game | Details |
|---|---|
| Batman Original release date(s): EU: 1986 | Release years by system: 1986 – Amstrad CPC, Amstrad PCW, MSX, ZX Spectrum |
| Batman Original release date(s): EU: 1986 | Notes: An isometric action-adventure game developed by Jon Ritman with graphics by Bernie Drummond, released by Manchester-based Ocean Software.; The game received 93% from Crash, and 5/5 from Sinclair User, also winning awards from Your Sinclair and ZX Computing.; Ritman and Drummond went on to create Head Over Heels using a modified version of the Batman game engine, allowing the game to feature two playable characters. |
| Batman: The Caped Crusader Original release date(s): EU: 1988; NA: 1988 | Release years by system: 1988 – Amiga, Amstrad CPC, Apple II, Commodore 64, MS-DOS, ZX Spectrum |
| Batman: The Caped Crusader Original release date(s): EU: 1988; NA: 1988 | Notes: Ocean Software's next Batman game was outsourced to developer Special FX and resembled Batman's comic appearances – comic book panels are displayed onscreen and play takes place within them. |
| Batman Original release date(s): EU: November 1989; NA: 1989 | Release years by system: 1989 – Amiga, Amstrad CPC, Atari ST, Commodore 64, GX4000, MS-DOS, MSX, ZX Spectrum |
| Batman Original release date(s): EU: November 1989; NA: 1989 | Notes: Also known as Batman: The Movie, the game is loosely based on the 1989 Batman film. It was coded by and released by Ocean Software.; Ocean were now noted for producing a wide range of film-licensed games that consisted largely of a series of sub-games. When the Batman games were released in 1989, this style was relatively new, and the game was well received by the video gaming press.; The 16-bit versions are similar to the 8-bit versions, but the extra memory, processor power, and graphic capabilities were put to use in the second and fourth levels, creating a full 3D effect instead of the side-scrolling subgames present in the 8-bit versions. Batman became the bundled game with the Amiga.; The game was number one in the Spectrum sales chart for the month of February 1990.; The game won the award for Game Of The Year 1989 in Crash magazine. |
| Batman Original release date(s): JP: December 22, 1989; NA: February 1990; EU: September 14, 1990 | Release years by system: 1989 – NES |
| Batman Original release date(s): JP: December 22, 1989; NA: February 1990; EU: September 14, 1990 | Notes: Inspired by the 1989 Batman film. |
| Batman Original release date(s): JP: April 13, 1990; NA: June 1990; EU: 1990 | Release years by system: 1990 – Game Boy |
| Batman Original release date(s): JP: April 13, 1990; NA: June 1990; EU: 1990 | Notes: Inspired by the 1989 Batman film. |
| Batman Original release date(s): JP: July 19, 1990; NA: June 27, 1991; EU: 1992 | Release years by system: 1990 – Genesis |
| Batman Original release date(s): JP: July 19, 1990; NA: June 27, 1991; EU: 1992 | Notes: Inspired by the 1989 Batman film. |
| Batman Original release date(s): JP: October 12, 1990 | Release years by system: 1990 – PC Engine |
| Batman Original release date(s): JP: October 12, 1990 | Notes: The game features gameplay similar to that of Pac-Man since it is viewed from an overhead perspective and involves Batman moving through mazes in order to collect enough items to move onto the next level. |
| Batman Original release date(s): NA: 1990 | Release years by system: 1990 – Arcade |
| Batman Original release date(s): NA: 1990 | Notes: Atari release, an arcade game based on the 1989 Batman film. It is a scrolling fighting game with driving and flying sections. |
| Batman: Return of the Joker Original release date(s): JP: December 20, 1991; NA: December 1991; EU: November 19, 1992 | Release years by system: 1991 – NES; 1992 – Genesis, Game Boy |
| Batman: Return of the Joker Original release date(s): JP: December 20, 1991; NA: December 1991; EU: November 19, 1992 | Notes: A Sunsoft game, a platforming-shooting game, with specialized boss fighting at the end of each level.; Gameplay is heavily inspired by Mega Man and Contra games.; The Game Boy version is a traditional side-scrolling platformer, with controls similar to the previous NES/Game Boy games.; The Genesis version is known as Batman: Revenge of the Joker.; A Super NES version of the game was planned, but was eventually cancelled. ROMs of the beta version can be found on the Internet. |
| Batman Returns Original release date(s): NA: June 19, 1992; EU: 1992 | Release years by system: 1992 – Atari Lynx |
| Batman Returns Original release date(s): NA: June 19, 1992; EU: 1992 | Notes: The Atari Lynx version, which was the first game release based on the 1992 film and also a pack-in game for the Lynx II system, was developed by Atari Corporation. Gameplay consists of side-scrolling combat. The game features a high difficulty level and Batman has a single life to complete the game. |
| Batman Returns Original release date(s): JP: 1992; NA: 1992; EU: 1993 | Release years by system: 1992 – Game Gear, Genesis; 1993 – Master System, Sega CD |
| Batman Returns Original release date(s): JP: 1992; NA: 1992; EU: 1993 | Notes: These games based on the film were published by Sega, but differed by platform. The Game Gear and Master System versions were developed by Aspect, and are largely the same outside of screen resolution; they were noted for their high difficulty level. Acme Interactive developed the Genesis version, which is an action adventure game with large environments and power ups to collect such as a grappling gun to reach new areas. The Sega CD version developed by Malibu Entertainment uses the main stages of the Genesis version, but also features 3D driving sections and cut-scenes and music from the film's soundtrack. |
| Batman Returns Original release date(s): NA: December 15, 1992 | Release years by system: 1992 – MS-DOS |
| Batman Returns Original release date(s): NA: December 15, 1992 | Notes: The MS-DOS game based on the film developed by Spirit of Discovery and published by Konami is an adventure game with combat sections. Batman views areas via video feeds in the Batcave before searching them for clues. |
| Batman Returns Original release date(s): JP: February 26, 1993; NA: April 1993; EU: May 7, 1993 | Release years by system: 1992 – Super NES |
| Batman Returns Original release date(s): JP: February 26, 1993; NA: April 1993; EU: May 7, 1993 | Notes: The Super NES game based on the film was developed and published by Konami. It features multiple play styles, with side scrolling beat 'em up levels, "run and gun" sections where enemies are defeated by thrown Batarangs, and driving stages in which the player shoots oncoming enemy vehicles while driving the Batmobile or Batskiboat. |
| Batman Returns Original release date(s): NA: January 1993; EU: May 1993 | Release years by system: 1993 – NES |
| Batman Returns Original release date(s): NA: January 1993; EU: May 1993 | Notes: The NES game based on the film published by Konami is a beat 'em up which closely follows the film's plot. The game also features two vehicle combat levels, one in which Batman is driving the Batmobile and another when he is piloting the Batskiboat. |
| Batman Returns Original release date(s): EU: 1993 | Release years by system: 1993 – Amiga |
| Batman Returns Original release date(s): EU: 1993 | Notes: The Amiga game based on the film was developed by Denton Designs and published by GameTek. It is a five-level platform game with beat 'em up and shoot 'em up elements. |
| Batman: The Animated Series Original release date(s): NA: November 1993 | Release years by system: 1993 – Game Boy |
| Batman: The Animated Series Original release date(s): NA: November 1993 | Notes: Developed by Konami, based on the animated series of the same name. The game features five side-scrolling platform levels in which Batman must defeat enemies and confront supervillains.; Robin is a playable character for two levels, in place of Batman. The game is only one player. |
| The Adventures of Batman & Robin Original release date(s): NA: December 1994; EU: 1994 | Release years by system: 1994 – Super NES; 1995 – Sega CD, Genesis, Game Gear |
| The Adventures of Batman & Robin Original release date(s): NA: December 1994; EU: 1994 | Notes: These games are based on Batman: The Animated Series. Konami developed and published the Super NES version, while Sega handled production for their own systems.; The Sega CD version consists of Batmobile chase screens. Between levels, the story advances through animated scenes that were created specifically for the game. The cutscenes were produced by Warner Bros. Animation and animated by TMS Entertainment, who also animated some of the episodes of the original cartoon.; The Genesis version is a 2D beat 'em up and shooter in the style of the Contra series, with some flying stages. It features the ability to play up to 2 player simultaneously as either Batman or Robin.; The Super NES version is a 1 player action/adventure game only (with Batman available). Most of the levels involve typical platforming schemes, although some levels require some searching and investigation (one involves the Batmobile). The player can use bat-gadgets, some of which are vital to complete a stage. |
| Batman Forever Original release date(s): NA: August 1995; EU: September 28, 1995; JP: October 27, 1995 | Release years by system: 1995 – Super NES, Game Boy, Genesis, Game Gear; 1996 – Microsoft Windows |
| Batman Forever Original release date(s): NA: August 1995; EU: September 28, 1995; JP: October 27, 1995 | Notes: Based on the console version's Mortal Kombat engine. As such, the characters (Batman or Robin) move like in the fighting game. In addition, both have a supply of items in order to help them in diverse tasks.; Graphics for the characters are digitized actors, rendered as sprites a la Mortal Kombat. |
| The Adventures of Batman and Robin Cartoon Maker Original release date(s): 1995 | Release years by system: 1995 – Microsoft Windows |
| The Adventures of Batman and Robin Cartoon Maker Original release date(s): 1995 | Notes: Cartoon episode directing game released by Knowledge Adventure and Instinct Corporation based on The Adventures of Batman and Robin animated series. |
| The Adventures of Batman and Robin Activity Center Original release date(s): 1996 | Release years by system: 1996 – Microsoft Windows |
| The Adventures of Batman and Robin Activity Center Original release date(s): 1996 | Notes: A Creativity game released by Gryphon Software Corp. based on The Adventures of Batman and Robin animated series. |
| Batman Forever: The Arcade Game Original release date(s): NA: November 30, 1996; EU: December 1996; JP: February 14, 1997 | Release years by system: 1996 – Arcade, Sega Saturn, Microsoft Windows, PlayStation |
| Batman Forever: The Arcade Game Original release date(s): NA: November 30, 1996; EU: December 1996; JP: February 14, 1997 | Notes: Acclaim Entertainment release, a scrolling beat 'em up. The player controls either Batman or Robin and has to guide them through various stages that are taken from the 1995 film Batman Forever. |
| Batman & Robin Original release date(s): NA: July 31, 1998; EU: August 1998 | Release years by system: 1998 – PlayStation, game.com |
| Batman & Robin Original release date(s): NA: July 31, 1998; EU: August 1998 | Notes: Based on the film of the same name. |
| Batman Beyond: Return of the Joker Original release date(s): NA: November 20, 2000; EU: December 15, 2000 | Release years by system: 2000 – Nintendo 64, PlayStation, Game Boy Color |
| Batman Beyond: Return of the Joker Original release date(s): NA: November 20, 2000; EU: December 15, 2000 | Notes: Known as Batman of the Future: Return of the Joker in Europe.; A sidescrolling beat 'em up based on the animated film of the same name, developed by Kemco and published by Ubisoft. |
| Batman: Chaos in Gotham Original release date(s): NA: April 16, 2001 | Release years by system: 2001 – Game Boy Color |
| Batman: Chaos in Gotham Original release date(s): NA: April 16, 2001 | Notes: Developed by Ubisoft and based on the animated series The New Batman Adventures. |
| Batman: Gotham City Racer Original release date(s): NA: April 19, 2001; EU: May 1, 2001 | Release years by system: 2001 – PlayStation |
| Batman: Gotham City Racer Original release date(s): NA: April 19, 2001; EU: May 1, 2001 | Notes: A racing game based on The New Batman Adventures animated series, developed by Ubisoft. |
| Batman: Vengeance Original release date(s): NA: October 23, 2001; EU: November 9, 2001 | Release years by system: 2001 – PlayStation 2, Game Boy Advance, GameCube, Xbox; 2002 – Microsoft Windows |
| Batman: Vengeance Original release date(s): NA: October 23, 2001; EU: November 9, 2001 | Notes: A platform game with third-person shooter elements also based on The New Batman Adventures. |
| Batman: Dark Tomorrow Original release date(s): NA: March 18, 2003; JP: March 20, 2003; EU: April 11, 2003 | Release years by system: 2003 – GameCube, Xbox |
| Batman: Dark Tomorrow Original release date(s): NA: March 18, 2003; JP: March 20, 2003; EU: April 11, 2003 | Notes: The game's plot was co-written by Scott Peterson of DC Comics and Kenji Terada, a Final Fantasy writer. |
| Batman: Justice Unbalanced Original release date(s): NA: September 22, 2003 | Release years by system: 2003 – macOS, Microsoft Windows |
| Batman: Justice Unbalanced Original release date(s): NA: September 22, 2003 | Notes: Educational game published by The Learning Company, aimed at teaching problem solving and similar skills to 7-10 year olds. The plot concerns villains Two-Face and The Penguin, who have joined forces to steal ornamental eggs.; Players guide Batman and Robin through five activities, each of which has multiple puzzles and three difficulty levels. |
| Batman: Toxic Chill Original release date(s): NA: September, 2003 | Release years by system: 2003 – macOS, Microsoft Windows |
| Batman: Toxic Chill Original release date(s): NA: September, 2003 | Notes: Another educational game published by The Learning Company and aimed at 7-10 year olds. The plot concerns villains Mr. Freeze and The Riddler, who have unleashed chemical waste and a freezing blizzard on Gotham City.; Like Batman: Justice Unbalanced, this is an action adventure game featuring Batman and Robin. Again there are five activities, each of which has multiple puzzles and three difficulty levels. |
| Batman: Rise of Sin Tzu Original release date(s): NA: October 16, 2003; EU: November 14, 2003 | Release years by system: 2003 – Xbox, PlayStation 2, Game Boy Advance, GameCube |
| Batman: Rise of Sin Tzu Original release date(s): NA: October 16, 2003; EU: November 14, 2003 | Notes: Introduces the new Batman universe character Sin Tzu, who was created by the artist Jim Lee. |
| The Batman Original release date(s): WW: 2004 | Release years by system: 2004 – Handheld TV game |
| The Batman Original release date(s): WW: 2004 | Notes: Based on The Batman, developed by HotGen and published by Jakks Pacific with five episodes. |
| Batman Begins Original release date(s): NA: June 14, 2005; EU: June 17, 2005 | Release years by system: 2005 – Game Boy Advance, GameCube, PlayStation 2, Xbox |
| Batman Begins Original release date(s): NA: June 14, 2005; EU: June 17, 2005 | Notes: Based on the film, developed by Eurocom and published by EA Games and Warner Bros. Interactive Entertainment.; Features a number of different styles of play, such as stealth, platforming and driving. |
| Lego Batman: The Videogame Original release date(s): NA: September 23, 2008; EU: October 9, 2008 | Release years by system: 2008 – Microsoft Windows, Nintendo DS, PlayStation 2, PlayStation 3, PlayStation Portable, Wii, Xbox 360 |
| Lego Batman: The Videogame Original release date(s): NA: September 23, 2008; EU: October 9, 2008 | Notes: Developed by Traveller's Tales, the game is based on the Lego line of Batman action figures, featuring a variety of characters from the Batman franchise. Batman vocal effects is provided by Steve Blum. |
| Batman: Arkham Asylum Original release date(s): NA: August 25, 2009; EU: August 28, 2009; JP: January 14, 2010 | Release years by system: 2009 – PlayStation 3, Xbox 360, Microsoft Windows; 2011 – macOS |
| Batman: Arkham Asylum Original release date(s): NA: August 25, 2009; EU: August 28, 2009; JP: January 14, 2010 | Notes: Developed from and by Rocksteady Studios and published by Eidos. Features Kevin Conroy, Mark Hamill, and Arleen Sorkin from Batman: The Animated Series, reprising their roles of Batman, the Joker, and Harley Quinn respectively.; The PlayStation 3 version contains exclusive Joker challenge levels in the form of downloadable content. |
| Batman: The Brave and the Bold – The Videogame Original release date(s): September 7, 2010 | Release years by system: 2010 – Wii, Nintendo DS |
| Batman: The Brave and the Bold – The Videogame Original release date(s): September 7, 2010 | Notes: The video game was developed by WayForward Technologies and distributed by Warner Bros. Interactive Entertainment. |
| Batman: Arkham City Original release date(s): NA: October 18, 2011; AU: October 19, 2011; EU: October 21, 2011 | Release years by system: 2011 – PlayStation 3, Xbox 360, Microsoft Windows; 2012 – Wii U, macOS |
| Batman: Arkham City Original release date(s): NA: October 18, 2011; AU: October 19, 2011; EU: October 21, 2011 | Notes: Sequel to Batman: Arkham Asylum. Features Kevin Conroy and Mark Hamill reprising their roles of Batman and the Joker respectively.; Mark Hamill had previously stated this as the last time he would voice the Joker. This changed with the release of Batman: Arkham Knight in 2015. |
| Lego Batman 2: DC Super Heroes Original release date(s): NA: June 19, 2012; EU: June 22, 2012 | Release years by system: 2012 – Microsoft Windows, Nintendo DS, Nintendo 3DS, PlayStation 3, PlayStation Vita, Wii, Xbox 360; 2013 – Wii U |
| Lego Batman 2: DC Super Heroes Original release date(s): NA: June 19, 2012; EU: June 22, 2012 | Notes: Sequel to Lego Batman: The Videogame and is the first Lego game to have voice acting.; Batman is voiced by Troy Baker who would later go to voice the Joker in Batman: Arkham Origins and Superman in Infinite Crisis. |
| Batman: Arkham Origins Original release date(s): October 25, 2013 | Release years by system: 2013 – Microsoft Windows, PlayStation 3, Wii U, Xbox 360 |
| Batman: Arkham Origins Original release date(s): October 25, 2013 | Notes: Prequel to Batman: Arkham Asylum and Batman: Arkham City.; Unlike Arkham Asylum and Arkham City, the game is not developed by Rocksteady Studios. WB Games Montréal, co-developer of Batman: Arkham City – Armored Edition, developed Arkham Origins, with additional development by Splash Damage for the game's multiplayer feature.; Kevin Conroy and Mark Hamill do not reprise their roles as Batman and the Joker, respectively. Instead, Roger Craig Smith voices Batman and Troy Baker voices the Joker.; This is the first game in the Batman: Arkham series to feature multiplayer.; Troy Baker received praise for his performance as the Joker and ended up in Entertainment Weekly's Best of 2013 for best breakout actor in video game industry for his performance as the Joker alongside his performance in BioShock Infinite and The Last of Us. |
| Batman: Arkham Origins Blackgate Original release date(s): October 25, 2013 | Release years by system: 2013 – Nintendo 3DS, PlayStation Vita; 2014 – Microsoft Windows, PlayStation 3, Wii U, Xbox 360 |
| Batman Original release date(s): December 2013 | Release years by system: 2013 – Arcade |
| Batman Original release date(s): December 2013 | Notes: Open-world driving game featuring ten different Batmobiles. |
| Lego Batman 3: Beyond Gotham Original release date(s): NA: November 11, 2014; EU: November 14, 2014 | Release years by system: 2014 – Microsoft Windows, Nintendo 3DS, PlayStation 3, PlayStation 4, PlayStation Vita, Wii U, Xbox 360, Xbox One |
| Lego Batman 3: Beyond Gotham Original release date(s): NA: November 11, 2014; EU: November 14, 2014 | Notes: Sequel to Lego Batman 2: DC Super Heroes. |
| Batman: Arkham Knight Original release date(s): WW: June 23, 2015 | Release years by system: Microsoft Windows, PlayStation 4, Xbox One |
| Batman: Arkham Knight Original release date(s): WW: June 23, 2015 | Notes: Sequel to Batman: Arkham City. Features Kevin Conroy reprising his role of Batman, along with Mark Hamill who reprises his role as The Joker through illusions in Batman's mind.; This is the first Batman game that receives a "Mature" rating from the Entertainment Software Rating Board. |
| Batman: The Telltale Series Original release date(s): WW: August 2, 2016 (Episode 1); WW: September 20, 2016 (Episode 2); WW: October 25, 2016 (Episode 3); WW: November 22, 2016 (Episode 4); WW: December 13, 2016 (Episode 5) | Release years by system: 2016 – Microsoft Windows, PlayStation 3, PlayStation 4, Xbox 360, Xbox One; 2017 – Nintendo Switch |
| Batman: The Telltale Series Original release date(s): WW: August 2, 2016 (Episode 1); WW: September 20, 2016 (Episode 2); WW: October 25, 2016 (Episode 3); WW: November 22, 2016 (Episode 4); WW: December 13, 2016 (Episode 5) | Notes: Five episode series, with a narrative done as a "fresh interpretation of the universe set in current times, not tied to any existing iteration of Batman in games, film, or comics".; Voiced by Troy Baker. |
| Batman: Arkham VR Original release date(s): WW: October 11, 2016 | Release years by system: 2016 – PlayStation 4; 2017 – Microsoft Windows |
| Batman: Arkham VR Original release date(s): WW: October 11, 2016 | Notes: A videogame for VR from the Batman: Arkham series. |
| Batman: Return to Arkham Original release date(s): WW: October 18, 2016 | Release years by system: 2016 – PlayStation 4, Xbox One |
| Batman: Return to Arkham Original release date(s): WW: October 18, 2016 | Notes: A remastered collection of Batman: Arkham Asylum and Batman: Arkham City. |
| Batman: The Enemy Within Original release date(s): WW: August 8, 2017 (Episode 1); WW: October 3, 2017 (Episode 2); WW: November 21, 2017 (Episode 3); WW: January 23, 2018 (Episode 4); WW: March 27, 2018 (Episode 5) | Release years by system: 2017 – Microsoft Windows, macOS, PlayStation 4, Xbox One; 2018 – Nintendo Switch |
| Batman: The Enemy Within Original release date(s): WW: August 8, 2017 (Episode 1); WW: October 3, 2017 (Episode 2); WW: November 21, 2017 (Episode 3); WW: January 23, 2018 (Episode 4); WW: March 27, 2018 (Episode 5) | Notes: Five episode series, sequel to Batman: The Telltale Series.; Voiced by Troy Baker. |
| Batman: Arkham Shadow Original release date(s): WW: October 21, 2024 | Release years by system: 2024 – Meta Quest 3, Meta Quest 3S |
| Batman: Arkham Shadow Original release date(s): WW: October 21, 2024 | Notes: The second VR game in the Batman: Arkham series and a narrative sequel to Batman: Arkham Origins and Batman: Arkham Origins Blackgate.; Voiced by Roger Craig Smith. |
| Lego Batman: Legacy of the Dark Knight Original release date(s): WW: May 22, 2026 | Release years by system: 2026 – Microsoft Windows, PlayStation 5, Xbox Series X/S; TBA – Nintendo Switch 2 |
| Lego Batman: Legacy of the Dark Knight Original release date(s): WW: May 22, 2026 | Notes: The fourth Lego Batman game.; Voiced by Shai Matheson. |
| Batman: Caped Crusader Chronicles Original release date(s): WW: July 31, 2026 | Release years by system: 2026 – Amazon Luna |
| Batman: Caped Crusader Chronicles Original release date(s): WW: July 31, 2026 | Notes: 11 Episode co-op game based on the animated series Batman: Caped Crusader on Prime Video.; Voiced by Hamish Linklater. |

== Related games ==
| Game | Details |
|---|---|
| The Revenge of Shinobi Original release date(s): JP: December 2, 1989; NA: December 2, 1989; EU: 1990 | Release years by system: Genesis |
| The Revenge of Shinobi Original release date(s): JP: December 2, 1989; NA: December 2, 1989; EU: 1990 | Notes: This 16-bit Sega game features an unauthorized Batman appearance as a boss antagonist. |
| Justice League Task Force Original release date(s): NA: August 24, 1995; JP: September 1, 1995; EU: 1995 | Release years by system: Genesis, Super NES |
| Justice League Task Force Original release date(s): NA: August 24, 1995; JP: September 1, 1995; EU: 1995 | Notes: |
| Justice League: Injustice for All Original release date(s): NA: November 20, 2002 | Release years by system: Game Boy Advance |
| Justice League: Injustice for All Original release date(s): NA: November 20, 2002 | Notes: |
| Justice League: Chronicles Original release date(s): NA: November 10, 2003 | Release years by system: Game Boy Advance |
| Justice League: Chronicles Original release date(s): NA: November 10, 2003 | Notes: |
| Justice League Heroes Original release date(s): NA: October 17, 2006; EU: November 24, 2006 | Release years by system: Nintendo DS, PlayStation 2, PlayStation Portable, Xbox |
| Justice League Heroes Original release date(s): NA: October 17, 2006; EU: November 24, 2006 | Notes: Released by Snowblind Studios, Batman is a main character. |
| Mortal Kombat vs. DC Universe Original release date(s): NA: November 16, 2008; EU: November 21, 2008 | Release years by system: PlayStation 3, Xbox 360 |
| Mortal Kombat vs. DC Universe Original release date(s): NA: November 16, 2008; EU: November 21, 2008 | Notes: Batman, the Joker and Catwoman are playable characters in this crossover fighting game.; One of Batman's Brutalities in the game features the dark knight throwing a Batarang at the opponent which begins emits sonic shouts, attracting a swarm of bats that begin antagonizing the opponent, causing them to fall over and try and fight them off. |
| DC Universe Online Original release date(s): January 11, 2011 | Release years by system: PlayStation 3, Microsoft Windows, PlayStation 4, Xbox One |
| DC Universe Online Original release date(s): January 11, 2011 | Notes: MMORPG based upon the fictional universe of DC Comics.; Players can choose Batman, Superman or Wonder Woman as their mentor if they play as a hero, or Lex Luthor, Joker, or Circe if they play as a villain. |
| Gotham City Impostors Original release date(s): NA: February 7, 2012 | Release years by system: Xbox 360, Microsoft Windows, PlayStation 3 |
| Gotham City Impostors Original release date(s): NA: February 7, 2012 | Notes: Multiplayer game set in Gotham City.; Batman himself appears from afar in the opening cinematic. |
| Injustice: Gods Among Us Original release date(s): NA: April 16, 2013; EU: April 19, 2013; AU: April 17, 2013 | Release years by system: Xbox 360, PlayStation 3, Wii U, Microsoft Windows, PlayStation 4, PlayStation Vita |
| Injustice: Gods Among Us Original release date(s): NA: April 16, 2013; EU: April 19, 2013; AU: April 17, 2013 | Notes: Fighting game from the creators of Mortal Kombat vs. DC Universe featuring Batman, Nightwing, Batgirl, Catwoman, Bane, Harley Quinn, and the Joker as playable characters, Batman is the primary protagonist in the game's storyline.; Voiced by Kevin Conroy. |
| Scribblenauts Unmasked: A DC Comics Adventure Original release date(s): NA: September 24, 2013; EU: September 24, 2013 | Release years by system: Wii U, Nintendo 3DS, PC |
| Scribblenauts Unmasked: A DC Comics Adventure Original release date(s): NA: September 24, 2013; EU: September 24, 2013 | Notes: Batman is first seen battling Deadshot. At first he does not trust Maxwell and Lily, but he gains their trust when Maxwell helps him defeat Deadshot. After Maxwell gains the starite from the Joker, Batman lets them use the Batcave as a place to stay. Later, at Wayne Manor, Batman and Maxwell battle Ra's al Ghul and his minions. Batman is later seen in the final battle on Braniac's ship, where he defeats the Joker and Harley Quinn, but is teleported by Braniac afterwards. At the end of the game, Batman is among the heroes who bid Maxwell and Lily farewell. His origin is also a playable bonus level. |
| Young Justice: Legacy Original release date(s): NA: November 19, 2013; EU: November 22, 2013 | Release years by system: Microsoft Windows, Nintendo 3DS, PlayStation 3, Xbox 360 |
| Young Justice: Legacy Original release date(s): NA: November 19, 2013; EU: November 22, 2013 | Notes: Video game based on Young Justice. |
| The Lego Movie Videogame Original release date(s): NA: February 7, 2014; EU: February 14, 2014 | Release years by system: Microsoft Windows, Nintendo 3DS, PlayStation 3, PlayStation 4, PlayStation Vita, Wii U, Xbox 360, Xbox One, macOS, iOS |
| The Lego Movie Videogame Original release date(s): NA: February 7, 2014; EU: February 14, 2014 | Notes: Video game based on The Lego Movie. |
| Infinite Crisis Original release date(s): March 26, 2015 | Release years by system: Microsoft Windows |
| Infinite Crisis Original release date(s): March 26, 2015 | Notes: Multiplayer online battle arena (MOBA) video game loosely based on the comic book series of the same name. |
| Lego Dimensions Original release date(s): September 27, 2015 | Release years by system: PlayStation 3, PlayStation 4, Wii U, Xbox 360, Xbox One |
| Lego Dimensions Original release date(s): September 27, 2015 | Notes: Lego action-adventure combining various universes from Warner Bros.; Batman is included in the game's starter pack, along with Gandalf from The Lord of the Rings, and Wyldstyle from The Lego Movie.; There are three playable versions of Batman in the game. The starter pack Batman originates from the Lego Batman video games, while Lego Movie Batman and Excalibur Batman originating from The Lego Movie. |
| Injustice 2 Original release date(s): May 16, 2017 | Release years by system: PlayStation 4, Xbox One, iOS, Android, Microsoft Windows |
| Injustice 2 Original release date(s): May 16, 2017 | Notes: Fighting game sequel to Injustice: Gods Among Us.; Batman, Bane, Catwoman, Robin, Harley Quinn, Nightwing, the Joker, Poison Ivy, Mr. Freeze, and Scarecrow are included in the game as playable characters. Batman is the primary protagonist of the game's storyline.; For his single-player ending, President Kane informs Batman he should be part of the emergency response in the wake of the war with Brainiac. Having left the Justice League in Flash and Green Lantern's care, Batman works to prepare for another battle with Superman even in semi-retirement.; Voiced by Kevin Conroy. |
| Arena of Valor Original release date(s): August 9, 2017 | Release years by system: iOS, Android |
| Arena of Valor Original release date(s): August 9, 2017 | Notes: MOBA game with license of DC Comics characters.; Batman is included in the game as playable character.; Published by Proxima Beta. |
| Lego DC Super-Villains Original release date(s): October 16, 2018 | Release years by system: PlayStation 4, Xbox One, Nintendo Switch, Microsoft Windows |
| Lego DC Super-Villains Original release date(s): October 16, 2018 | Notes: Batman is a playable character. Sequel to Lego Batman 3: Beyond Gotham, with Kevin Conroy reprising his role as Batman. |
| The Lego Movie 2 Videogame Original release date(s): NA: February 26, 2019; EU: March 1, 2019 | Release years by system: Microsoft Windows, Nintendo Switch, PlayStation 4, Xbox One, macOS |
| The Lego Movie 2 Videogame Original release date(s): NA: February 26, 2019; EU: March 1, 2019 | Notes: Video game based on The Lego Movie 2: The Second Part. |
| MultiVersus Original release date(s): NA: 2022; EU: 2022 | Release years by system: Microsoft Windows, PlayStation 4, Xbox One, PlayStation 5, Xbox Series X/S |
| MultiVersus Original release date(s): NA: 2022; EU: 2022 | Notes: A crossover fighting game featuring Batman, The Joker and Harley Quinn as playable characters.; Voiced by Kevin Conroy. |
| Gotham Knights Original release date(s): October 21, 2022 | Release years by system: Microsoft Windows, PlayStation 5, Xbox Series X/S |
| Gotham Knights Original release date(s): October 21, 2022 | Notes: An action role-playing game featuring Batman and his supporting cast of sidekicks. Batman is not playable.; Voiced by Michael Antonakos.; Developed by WB Games Montréal and published by Warner Bros. Games. |
| Justice League: Cosmic Chaos Original release date(s): March 10, 2023 | Release years by system: Nintendo Switch, PlayStation 4, PlayStation 5, Windows, Xbox One, Xbox Series X/S |
| Justice League: Cosmic Chaos Original release date(s): March 10, 2023 | Notes: Developed by PHL Collective and published by Outright Games.; Batman is a playable character.; Voiced by Diedrich Bader. |
| Suicide Squad: Kill the Justice League Original release date(s): WW: February 2, 2024 | Release years by system: PlayStation 5, Windows, Xbox Series X/S |
| Suicide Squad: Kill the Justice League Original release date(s): WW: February 2, 2024 | Notes: Developed by Rocksteady Studios; Set in the universe previously established by the Batman: Arkham series. |
| Fortnite Original release date(s): WW: September 21, 2019 | Release years by system: PlayStation 5, Windows, Xbox Series X/S |
| Fortnite Original release date(s): WW: September 21, 2019 | Notes: Developed by Epic Games; Batman crossover event released in celebration of Batman Day. |
| Minecraft Original release date(s): 18 November, 2011 | Release years by system: Windows, Xbox One, Nintendo Switch, PlayStation 4, PlayStation 5, Android, ChromeOS, iOS, iPadOS, Fire OS, Xbox Series X and S, Nintendo Switch 2 |
| Minecraft Original release date(s): 18 November, 2011 | Notes: Minecraft DLC developed by Noxcrew, published by Mojang Studios. |

== Mobile games ==
| Game | Details |
|---|---|
| Batman Begins Original release date(s): WW: 2005 | Release years by system: Mobile phone |
| Batman Begins Original release date(s): WW: 2005 | Notes: A spin-off of the film of the same name, this game is a stealth game/platformer in which Batman fights against Falcone and his henchmen.; Published by Warner Bros. Online. |
| Lego Batman: The Mobile Game Original release date(s): WW: 2008 | Release years by system: Mobile phone, Smartphone |
| Lego Batman: The Mobile Game Original release date(s): WW: 2008 | Notes: A mobile phone spin-off of the console game Lego Batman: The Videogame.; Published by Cobra mobile. |
| The Dark Knight Original release date(s): WW: 2008 | Release years by system: Mobile phone |
| The Dark Knight Original release date(s): WW: 2008 | Notes: Based on the film of the same name. |
| The Dark Knight: Batmobile Game Original release date(s): WW: December 29, 2008 | Release years by system: iPhone |
| The Dark Knight: Batmobile Game Original release date(s): WW: December 29, 2008 | Notes: This game is a rail racer/shooter that utilises the iPhone's touchscreen and orientation-sensors.; Published by Warner Bros. Online. |
| Superman/Batman: Heroes United Original release date(s): WW: 2009 | Release years by system: Mobile phone |
| Superman/Batman: Heroes United Original release date(s): WW: 2009 | Notes: This game is a platformer in which the player alternates between using Superman and Batman for each level.; The game's antagonist is Darkseid.; Published by Glu Mobile. |
| Batman: Guardian of Gotham Original release date(s): WW: 2010 | Release years by system: Mobile phone |
| Batman: Guardian of Gotham Original release date(s): WW: 2010 | Notes: This game is a rail shooter that features Batman using Batarangs against the villains of Gotham City.; The game features the Joker and Two-Face (the antagonists from the 2008 film The Dark Knight).; Published by Glu Mobile. |
| Batman: Arkham City Lockdown Original release date(s): WW: December 7, 2011 | Release years by system: iOS, Android |
| The Dark Knight Rises Original release date(s): WW: 2012 | Release years by system: iOS, Android, Windows Phone |
| The Dark Knight Rises Original release date(s): WW: 2012 | Notes: Based on the film of the same name.; Published by Gameloft. |
| Batman: Arkham Origins (mobile) Original release date(s): WW: October 16, 2013 | Release years by system: iOS, Android |
| Batman: The Telltale Series Original release date(s): WW: August 2, 2016 (Episode 1); WW: September 20, 2016 (Episode 2); WW: October 25, 2016 (Episode 3); WW: November 22, 2016 (Episode 4); WW: December 13, 2016 (Episode 5) | Release years by system: Android, iOS |
| Batman: The Telltale Series Original release date(s): WW: August 2, 2016 (Episode 1); WW: September 20, 2016 (Episode 2); WW: October 25, 2016 (Episode 3); WW: November 22, 2016 (Episode 4); WW: December 13, 2016 (Episode 5) | Notes: Mobile version of the game of the same name.; Published by Telltale Inc. |
| The Lego Batman Movie Game Original release date(s): WW: January 10, 2017 | Release years by system: Android, iOS |
| The Lego Batman Movie Game Original release date(s): WW: January 10, 2017 | Notes: Based on The Lego Batman Movie.; Published by Warner Bros.; The game is endless running game, with a section to customize the vehicle and a DJ minigame. |
| Batman: The Enemy Within Original release date(s): WW: August 8, 2017 (Episode 1); WW: October 3, 2017 (Episode 2); WW: November 21, 2017 (Episode 3); WW: January 23, 2018 (Episode 4); WW: March 27, 2018 (Episode 5) | Release years by system: Android, iOS |
| Batman: The Enemy Within Original release date(s): WW: August 8, 2017 (Episode 1); WW: October 3, 2017 (Episode 2); WW: November 21, 2017 (Episode 3); WW: January 23, 2018 (Episode 4); WW: March 27, 2018 (Episode 5) | Notes: Mobile version of the game of the same name. |

== See also ==
- List of video games based on DC Comics
