= Batman Returns (SNES video game) =

1993 video game

- North American box art
- Developer: Konami
- Publisher: Konami
- Director: Yoichi Yoshimoto
- Designers: Yoichi Yoshimoto; Tae Yabu; Tetsuya Sato
- Programmers: Etsunobu Ebisu; Toshinori Shimono; Shigeki Morihira
- Composers: Jun Funahashi; Harumi Ueko
- Series: Batman
- Platform: Super Nintendo Entertainment System
- Release: JP: February 26, 1993; NA: April 1993; EU: May 7, 1993
- Genre: Beat 'em up
- Mode: Single-player

Batman Returns (バットマンリターンズ) is a 1993 beat 'em up video game developed and published by Konami for the Super Nintendo Entertainment System, based on the 1992 film of the same name.

== Gameplay ==
An example of gameplay.

The game is a left-to-right scrolling fighter beat 'em up, a genre that was featured heavily on the console at the time. The gameplay and graphics are very similar to the Super Famicom port of Final Fight. The game takes the player through seven scenes featured in the film. Each scene has a boss fight that Batman must win in order to proceed to the next scene. Scene 1 takes place in Gotham's Plaza, where Batman fights numerous Red Triangle Circus gangsters and saves Selina Kyle from the Stungun Clown who took her hostage. In Scene 2, Batman fights the Circus gang throughout Gotham City's Streets, facing the Tattooed Strongman as the boss. Climbing on the rooftops of Scene 3, Batman encounters Catwoman, who escapes to an abandoned building where Penguin's setting a trap for Batman, but he manages to take on Catwoman and Penguin on Scene 4. In Scene 5, Batman drives the Batmobile and uses a machine gun to destroy Penguin's Campaign Van. Moving to Scene 6, Batman goes to the Circus Train and defeats Penguin's right-hand man, the Organ Grinder. Penguin escapes to the abandoned Arctic World on Scene 7, where Batman destroys his Duck Vehicle and ultimately gains the upper hand on Penguin once and for all. Meanwhile, Catwoman escapes and watches as Batman gets called for another adventure. Various members of the Red Triangle Circus Gang attack Batman throughout the game. Batman has a number of weapons and moves at his disposal, including the batarang.

== Release and reception ==
Reception

Review scores
Publication	Score
Computer and Video Games	67/100
Famitsu	7/10, 8/10, 8/10, 8/10
GameFan	85%, 92%, 97%, 84%
GamesMaster	85%
Nintendo Life	7/10
Official Nintendo Magazine	90/100
Super Play	87%
Total!	(UK) 66% (DE) 1-
VideoGames & Computer Entertainment	8/10
Hippon Super!	6/10
Marukatsu Super Famicom	7/10, 8/10, 8/10, 9/10
N-Force	76/100
Nintendo Game Zone	84/100
SNES Force	82%
Super Action	91%
Super Control	79%
Super Gamer	90%
Super Pro	90/100

Batman Returns was released in Japan on for the Super Famicom on February 26, 1993.

Batman Returns on the Super NES received generally favorable reception from critics. GamePro's Lawrence Neves lauded the game for its overall graphical department, soundscapes, and adjustable difficulty level. Super Gamer called it one of the finest beat 'em ups, praising its audiovisual department, but felt its only flaw was that it was a bit too easy at the lower difficulty level.

Nintendo Power ranked Batman Returns the eighth best Super NES game of 1993. In 2018, Complex included Batman Returns on their best Super Nintendo games of all time list. In 2023, Time Extension listed the game as one of the best beat 'em ups of all time.
