= DC Dual Force =

2023 video game

- Developers: CCG Lab, Cryptozoic Entertainment
- Publisher: YUKE's
- Platform: Microsoft Windows
- Release: October 17, 2023
- Genre: Digital collectible card game
- Modes: Single-player, Multiplayer

DC Dual Force was a free-to-play digital collectible card game (DCCG) featuring characters from the DC Universe and playable comics from DC Comics. The game is licensed by Warner Bros. Interactive Entertainment, developed by CCG Lab and Cryptozoic Entertainment, and published by YUKE's. It was publicly available in open beta from July 14, 2023 and released on Steam and the Epic Games Store on October 17, 2023. It featured Pete Sepenuk as the voice of Batman, who was the ever present narrator walking players through the game.

As of February 29, 2024, DC Dual Force and its servers were shut down.
