= Batman (1991 video game) =

1991 video game

- Developer: Atari Games
- Publisher: Atari Games
- Director: Kelly Turner
- Producer: John Ray
- Programmers: John Moore; Pat McCarthy
- Artists: Bridget Erdmann; Chuck Eyler; Kris Moser
- Composer: John Paul
- Series: Batman
- Platform: Arcade
- Release: NA: April 1991
- Genre: Beat 'em up
- Mode: Single-player

Batman is a horizontally scrolling beat 'em up arcade video game released by Atari Games in 1991.

== Gameplay ==
Gameplay screenshot

The storyline is based on the eponymous 1989 movie. It features stages based on locations in the film, including first-person perspective control of the Batmobile and the Batwing. The game features audio clips of Batman (Michael Keaton) and the Joker (Jack Nicholson) as well as digitized photos from the film. Batman can use various weapons, such as batarangs and gas grenades, as he takes on a variety of goons as well as the Joker himself.

== Development and release ==
Konami was also in talks of releasing an arcade game based on the 1989 film around the same time as Atari but "other companies got in the way". It is suspected that company was Atari.
