= Batman: The Animated Series (video game) =

1993 video game

- Developer: Konami
- Publisher: Konami
- Series: Batman
- Platform: Game Boy
- Release: November 1993
- Genre: Platformer
- Mode: Single-player

Batman: The Animated Series is a platformer video game by Konami released for the Game Boy in 1993, based on the television series of the same title. In the game, the player controls either Batman or Robin as they thwart the villains of Gotham City such as Joker and Mr. Freeze.

The game was the third Batman game for the Game Boy following two titles from Sunsoft: Batman: The Video Game (1990) and Batman: Return of the Joker (1992). Reviewers praised the graphics of the game and complimented how it captured the look of the animated series. The game had mediocre reviews in terms of its gameplay, citing little variety and minimal challenge.

== Gameplay ==
Batman: The Animated Series is a single-player side scrolling platformer game. The player can switch between Batman and Robin to gain access to character-specific abilities. Batman uses a grappling hook to scale heights, Robin walks across ceilings, and both characters can perform wall jumps. Bat shaped power-ups provide the player with a small supply of batarangs that allows Batman to attack enemies from a distance. A health meter at the bottom of the screen displays how much damage the player character heroes can take. Power-ups shaped liked hearts can be found that provide energy and restores lost health. When this health meter is depleted, the player loses a life and a continue can be used. The amount of continues and the difficulty level can be adjusted prior to beginning the game.

The game has six levels. At the end of each level, Batman faces one of his rivals in the form of a boss, such as the Riddler and Penguin. Each of the levels are presented with their own set stories. The first involves Batman preventing Joker from sending exploding teddy bears to Gotham City's residents. Others range from stopping a pact between Scarecrow and Mr. Freeze and rescuing Harvey Dent from Poison Ivy. The final level involves a second battle against Joker.

== Development ==
Bill Kunkel wrote in Electronic Games that by 1993 cartoon and comic book characters had become "red hot license properties" with developers taken advantage of 16-bit graphics and multimedia technology which led to various companies signing up to license their characters into video games from Disney, Hanna-Barbera and Warner Brothers along with then newer television programs such as The Simpsons, Ren & Stimpy and Batman: The Animated Series. Kunkel added that these games made for video game consoles led to further ports and original games made for handhelds.

Batman: The Animated Series is based on the Batman: The Animated Series television series. The music in the game borrows cues from Danny Elfman's Batman music from the Batman film series and the animated series. When the character approaches a boss scene, the music changes to having what an Electronic Games reviewer described as faster more "tension building" music.

It was the third Batman game made for the Game Boy following Sunsoft's Batman: The Video Game (1990) and Batman: Return of the Joker (1992). Batman: The Animated Series was released in November 1993 and published by Konami.

== Release and reception ==
Reception

Review scores
Publication	Score
Aktueller Software Markt	9/12
Consoles +	85%
Computer and Video Games	84%
Joypad	91%
Mega Fun	77%
Total!	89%
Video Games (DE)	82%
Electronic Games	77%

Reviewers in video game magazines Consoles +, Joypad, Electronic Games and Total! complimented the graphics in the game. A reviewer in Joypad noted the small sprite size of the character, but found it not nearly as small as the previous Game Boy Batman games. Total! said that "The look and feel of the cartoon have been captured wonderfully, with your Batman sprite leaping around, punching baddies and avoiding traps against stunning backdrops which really convey the atmosphere of a dark, rainy city." A reviewer in Electronic Games said there was "little blur that is associated with Game Boy games" and the "heavily detailed, well done backgrounds are the closest Batman: The Animated Series comes to recreating the animated television series." The reviewer continued that it lacked the drama of the television series it was based on, saying "there is no way the Game Boy can recreate the dramatic writing, muted colors and gripping action of the cartoon." and "it doesn't feel like we are running through the streets of Gotham with Batman. Fighting super villains should be more exciting than this."

Aktueller Software Markt found the difficulty level to be moderate, while reviewers in Nintendo Power noted that most enemies presented little to no challenge and Total! said the game was quite easy to complete. While Nintendo Power said the game had excellent controls, GamePro described the controls as requiring "plenty of patience".

The reviewer in Joypad said the game contained superb music, while reviewers in GamePro and Electronic Games grew tired of the "Batman Theme" being used continuously throughout the game. The Electronic Games review added that this "wouldn't be so bad if the piece in question were something quick and driving, suitable for an action game. Instead, we hear a sort of low key, mid-tempo piece that sounds like music to creep through a haunted house by."

The review in Joypad ultimately found it better than the second Batman game for the Game Boy, but does not surpass the first title. The Total! reviewer said the game felt a little too similar to the Teenage Mutant Ninja Turtles games of the time. Kunkel described Batman: The Animated Series as "one of the year's strongest GB entries."

== See also ==
- List of Game Boy games
