= Batman Forever: The Arcade Game =

1996 video game

- North American arcade flyer
- Developer: Iguana Entertainment (Note: PlayStation and Saturn versions developed by Iguana UK.)
- Publisher: Acclaim Entertainment
- Producer: Neill Glancy
- Designers: David Dienstbier; Ian Dunlop; Jason Carpenter
- Programmers: Carl Wade; Stephen Broumley
- Artist: Michael McCallion
- Composer: Rick Fox
- Series: Batman
- Platforms: Arcade, PlayStation, Sega Saturn, MS-DOS
- Release: March 1996: Arcade; NA/UK: March 1996 PlayStation; EU: November 16, 1996; NA: December 3, 1996; JP: February 14, 1997 Saturn; EU: November 16, 1996; NA: November 21, 1996; JP: February 14, 1997 MS-DOS; NA: November 30, 1996
- Genre: Beat 'em up
- Modes: Single-player, multiplayer
- Arcade system: Sega ST-V

Batman Forever: The Arcade Game is a 1996 beat 'em up video game developed by Iguana Entertainment and published by Acclaim Entertainment for arcades. It is based on the 1995 film Batman Forever, with the subtitle used to differentiate it from the 1995 game Batman Forever, which was also released by Acclaim Entertainment. In the game, one or two players, playing as Batman and Robin, fight Two-Face, the Riddler, and numerous henchmen. Batman Forever: The Arcade Game was Acclaim's first arcade game, and was later ported to the PlayStation, Sega Saturn, and MS-DOS.

== Gameplay ==
Arcade version screenshot

Taking on the role of either Batman or Robin, players can punch, kick, and use special combination attacks to defeat waves of enemies. The special combinations applied to enemies can add up to a possible 150+ hits on a single villain. Special weapons, such as Batarangs, can be found throughout the levels. It is sectioned off into stages, and arranged with waves of enemies before ending with a boss. The game has a two-player mode that allows both players to use the same character if so desired.

== Development ==
Batman Forever: The Arcade Game, which was Acclaim Entertainment's first arcade game, was first demonstrated at the 1996 American Coin Machine Exposition. It was built on Sega's "Titan" technology, the hardware which formed the foundation for the 32X and Sega Saturn.

Prior to the release of the arcade and home versions, an Atari Jaguar CD port was in development by Probe Entertainment after Atari Corporation and Acclaim announced their partnership in 1995 that included plans to release three titles for the system, but Batman Forever: The Arcade Game was later licensed to Atari Corp. a few months later after the announcement of the partnership and was going to be based upon the PlayStation version that was also in development at the time. The port was originally slated to be published around the third quarter of 1995 and was later rescheduled for an April/Q1 1996 release, but work on the port was discontinued sometime in 1995 and was never released.

== Reception ==
Reception

Review scores
Publication	Score
Electronic Gaming Monthly	5/10, 6.5/10, 4.5/10, 3/10 (SAT)
GameSpot	5.6/10 (SAT)
IGN	5/10
Next Generation	3/5 (ARC); 1/5 (SAT)
Play	41% (PS)
Sega Saturn Magazine	63% (SAT)

Reviewing the arcade version, a Next Generation critic praised the large selection of elaborate moves and combos, likening it to the Street Fighter series in this respect, as well as the use of sprite scaling to enable a wider range of movement and deeper gameplay, but still argued that the game lacks sufficient innovation to save the aging 2D beat 'em up genre. He also criticized the predictable level design and the gloomy graphics, saying they make it difficult to follow the action.

The Saturn conversion received mediocre reviews. Criticisms widely varied from review to review, but the most commonly cited problems were that the gameplay is too repetitive and the character graphics are blocky. Critics mostly assessed the game on its own terms rather than its quality as a conversion, though a Next Generation critic noted that the Saturn version is missing frames of animation from the arcade version. He summarized the game, and beat 'em ups in general, as "All flash, and absolutely zero substance." Lee Nutter of Sega Saturn Magazine called it "a poor man's Guardian Heroes, except that it is actually quite expensive." GameSpot's Glenn Rubenstein and Electronic Gaming Monthly's Shawn Smith and Dan Hsu were somewhat more positive, remarking that while the game is objectively weak, its sheer loudness and chaotic energy are not without a certain charm. GamePro, while having little but criticism for the game, said that fans of side-scrolling beat 'em ups should try the game as a rental, since the genre had largely died out by the time of the game's release.

In a feature on the game, Electronic Gaming Monthly stated that the Saturn and PlayStation versions are identical aside from minor cosmetic differences, such as differing loading screens and the PlayStation version lacking the Batmobile intro's screen blurring effect. GamePro's review of the PlayStation version said it was a faithful conversion, but that the fun of the arcade version simply does not translate to the home console experience.
