= Batman: Gotham City Racer =

2001 video game

- North American cover art
- Developer: Sinister Games
- Publisher: Ubi Soft
- Series: Batman
- Platform: PlayStation
- Release: NA: April 18, 2001; EU: May 18, 2001
- Genre: Racing
- Modes: Single-player, multiplayer

Batman: Gotham City Racer is a racing video game released in 2001 by Ubisoft for the PlayStation. It is based on The New Batman Adventures and incorporated many clips from the series into the game.

== Gameplay ==
Batman: Gotham City Racer is a racing video game featuring characters from the Batman franchise. The player takes on the role of Batman, Robin, Batgirl, or Nightwing, and competes in a series of street races across the city of Gotham.

The game features a variety of different race types, including checkpoint races, point-to-point races, and circuit races. The races take place on a variety of different tracks around Gotham City, each with their own unique challenges and obstacles.

During races, players can collect power-ups scattered throughout the track, including rockets, mines, and shields. These power-ups can be used to gain an advantage over opponents or defend against attacks.

As players progress through the game, they can unlock new characters, tracks, and vehicles. Each character has their own unique abilities and attributes, such as faster acceleration or better handling. The vehicles also vary in speed, handling, and durability, allowing players to choose the best vehicle for each race.

== Reception ==
In a preview of the game, IGN noted that Ubisoft had taken over the Batman license and described the title (then tentatively called Batman Vehicle Adventure) as a driving-focused game set in the art-deco world of The New Batman Adventures. IGN highlighted the planned forty episodic missions, as well as Adventure and Patrol modes, and mentioned that the Batmobile would feature various gadgets and weapons similar to those seen in the animated series.
