= Batman & Robin (video game) =

1998 video game

- North American cover art
- Developer: Probe Entertainment
- Publisher: Acclaim Entertainment
- Producer: Peter Jones
- Designer: Matt Nagy
- Programmer: David Shea
- Artist: Guy Mills
- Composer: Tim Follin
- Series: Batman
- Platforms: PlayStation, Game.com
- Release: NA: 4 August 1998; EU: 21 August 1998
- Genre: Action-adventure
- Mode: Single-player

Batman & Robin is a 1998 action-adventure video game for the PlayStation based on DC Comics character Batman and the 1997 film Batman & Robin. It was developed by Probe Entertainment and published by Acclaim Entertainment in conjunction with Warner Bros. Interactive Entertainment and DC Comics. The game received mixed to negative reviews.

== Gameplay ==
The game uses elements of a sandbox-style game, such as real-time events, traffic simulation, and civilian population. The player can choose one of the film's three heroes, Batman, Robin or Batgirl. Each character uses a unique vehicle. Batman drives the Batmobile, Robin the Redbird motorcycle and Batgirl uses the Batblade. In the game, the player travels around Gotham City and completes various individual missions, such as preventing Mr. Freeze from robbing a bank. Most of the events are not triggered; instead, each event occurs at a certain time. For example, Mr. Freeze's bank robbery occurs at 7 p.m. The player must find clues and discover the plot with the help of the Batcomputer. If the player cannot find enough clues, the event occurs, failing the mission. Some situations are derived directly from the plot of the film, while others were conceived for the game.

== Development ==
Acclaim originally scheduled Batman & Robin for release in the third quarter of 1997, in order to coincide with the film's theatrical release. Acclaim chairman and CEO Greg Fischbach commented on the decision to delay the game until 1998: "We recently told analysts that we might take a small loss this financial quarter because we chose not to release product that we felt wasn't done. I'm talking about Forsaken and Batman and Robin. Now, the old Acclaim may have pushed these products into the marketplace and wouldn't have dreamed of saying to Wall Street, 'We're sorry, but we're not going to be profitable this quarter.' So this is a new stance for us."

== Reception ==
Reception

Aggregate score
Aggregator	Score
GameRankings	47%

Review scores
Publication	Score
AllGame	1/5
CNET Gamecenter	4/10
Consoles +	75%
Electronic Gaming Monthly	2.375/10 (Note: In Electronic Gaming Monthly's review of the game, one critic gave it 3/10, two critics gave it each a score of 2/10, and the other one gave it 2.5/10.)
Game Informer	5/10
GameSpot	5.7/10
IGN	5/10
Next Generation	2/5
PlayStation Official Magazine – UK	6/10
Official U.S. PlayStation Magazine	1/5

Like the film, the PlayStation game was critically and commercially unsuccessful, as it received generally unfavourable reviews according to the review aggregation website GameRankings. Game Informer gave it a mixed review, over two months before it was released Stateside. IGN gave a mixed review; they praised the graphics, music and a selection of characters to play, but were critical to the controls. Next Generation was more critical to the game, criticizing the graphics, level design, gameplay and controls. GamePro gave a positive review in terms of graphics, sound, and gameplay, but was critical to the controls. (Note: GamePro gave the game two 4/5 scores for graphics and sound, 1.5/5 for control, and 3.5/5 for fun factor.) There was also a version for the Game.com handheld which got worse ratings than the PlayStation version.

The game won the award for "Most Faithful Use of a Movie License" at the 1998 OPM Editors' Awards.
