= Batman: Chaos in Gotham =

2001 video game

- Developer: Digital Eclipse Software
- Publisher: Ubi Soft
- Producer: Michael Bilodeau
- Programmer: Wulupon
- Writer: Daniel Young
- Composer: Robert Baffy
- Series: Batman
- Platform: Game Boy Color
- Release: NA: March 27, 2001
- Genre: Action
- Mode: Single-player

Batman: Chaos in Gotham is a 2001 action video game developed by Digital Eclipse Software and published by Ubisoft for the Game Boy Color. It is based on The New Batman Adventures.

== Plot ==
Arkham Asylum has undergone a massive breakout and all manner of super-villains are running rampant throughout Gotham City. While rounding up the escaped inmates, Mr. Freeze, The Joker, Harley Quinn, Roxy Rocket, Poison Ivy and Bane, Batman comes to find out that it was Two-Face who masterminded the breakout and must stop him before he can bring Gotham City to its knees.

== Reception ==
Reception

Aggregate score
Aggregator	Score
GameRankings	63.50%

Review scores
Publication	Score
Electronic Gaming Monthly	5 out of 10
Game Informer	6 out of 10
GameSpot	7.4 out of 10
IGN	7 out of 10
Nintendo Power	3/5

The game has received mixed reviews from both the critics and fans alike. GameRankings gave it a score of 63.50%.
