= Batman: The Caped Crusader =

1988 video game

- Developer: Special FX Software
- Publishers: EU: Ocean Software; NA: Data East
- Producers: D. C. Ward; Paul Finnegan
- Designer: Jonathan M. Smith
- Programmers: Keith Robinson; Frank Robinson; Robert Tinman; Jim Bagley
- Artists: Andy Rixon; Charles Davies; Karen Davies
- Composers: Keith Tinman; Fred Gray
- Series: Batman
- Platforms: Amiga, Amstrad CPC, Atari ST, Commodore 64, Apple II, MS-DOS, ZX Spectrum
- Release: EU: 1988; NA: 1989
- Genre: Action-adventure
- Mode: Single-player

Batman: The Caped Crusader is an action-adventure game developed by Special FX Software (Jonathan Smith, Jim Bagley, Keith Robinson, Charles Davies, and Keith Tinman) and published by Ocean Software in 1988. It was licensed by Data East and Erbe Software for release in North America and Spain. It was the second of three unrelated Batman games released by Ocean, after Batman in 1986 and preceding Batman: The Movie in 1989. The Apple II version was developed by California-based Quicksilver Software; it requires a 128k IIe or IIc to run. As with many other Ocean releases, the C64 port came in separate cassette and disk releases; the North American NTSC version was based on the latter. The disk version contained slightly remixed music and differences in enemy spawns.

== Gameplay ==
Screen from the Amiga version of Batman: The Caped Crusader.

Batman: The Caped Crusader is an arcade adventure which uses a unique style, innovated by Jonathan Smith and Charles Davies, to display the action as though it takes place in a comic book. This technique involved having each game location set in its own panel, often with a comic book style caption in the upper-left corner, with inactive panels faded out behind the current active location. This concept was expanded upon by Sega's Comix Zone seven years later.

The game was split into two independently playable parts in which Batman is faced with two of his most well-known adversaries: "A Bird In The Hand" featuring the Penguin and "A Fete Worse Than Death" which involved the Joker. The gameplay involves Batman using punches and kicks and his batarang (a thrown weapon) in order to fight the villains' henchmen as well as solving puzzles.

== Reception ==
Reception

Award
| Publication | Award |
|---|---|
| Crash | Smash |

Your Sinclair magazine awarded it 9 out of 10, praising the colourful and expressive graphics and the inclusion of two separate adventures. Computer Gaming World also gave a positive review, praising the graphics, particularly the Atari ST's graphics over the C64's, but noted that the game emphasises mazes and puzzles over beating up bad guys, and as such did not quite meet expectations.
