= Justice League: Injustice for All =

2002 video game

- Developer: Saffire
- Publisher: Midway Games
- Director: Brian Christensen
- Producers: Kevin Potter; Ames Kirshen; Adam Schwenk
- Designers: Andrew Nielson; Jason Ablett; John Nielson
- Programmer: John Nielson
- Artist: Andrew Nielson
- Writer: Flint Dille
- Composer: Rick Bradshaw
- Platform: Game Boy Advance
- Release: NA: November 18, 2002
- Genres: Beat 'em up, platform
- Mode: Single-player

Justice League: Injustice for All is a 2002 video game developed by Saffire and published by Midway Games for the Game Boy Advance. The game is based on the Justice League animated television series and showcases the League's seven members within the context of a side-scrolling beat 'em up with platforming elements. The plot centers on the League's efforts to avert global catastrophe carried out by Lex Luthor's Injustice Gang.

Development commenced upon Midway Games' acquisition of the rights to the Justice League of America comic book series and TV series, which took place during an industry-wide trend of video game publishers acquiring comic book superhero licenses. The game received mixed reviews from critics, who regarded it as a short and formulaic brawler indistinct from other entries in the genre.

== Gameplay ==
The Flash, one of the playable characters in Justice League: Injustice for All, is capable of running up vertical surfaces.

Justice League: Injustice for All is a side-scrolling beat 'em up with platforming elements. The player controls the titular Justice League's seven members — Superman, Batman, Wonder Woman, The Flash, Green Lantern, Hawkgirl, and Martian Manhunter — as they attempt to thwart Lex Luthor's scheme to brainwash the world's populace. The game is divided into twelve levels, the progression through which is constructed in a non-linear fashion; completing a level creates branching paths to a number of other levels that can be accessed in any order. For each level, the player is assigned two League members who are interchangeable at any time with the select button; the swap will also occur automatically if one character runs out of health. Apart from jumping and basic attacks, the characters (excluding Batman and the Flash) can fly with the use of the right trigger button, while the left trigger button enables a special technique. For example, Martian Manhunter can make himself intangible and pass through walls, while the Flash can use his super-speed to run up vertical surfaces. Each level requires the player to locate and destroy one of Luthor's brainwashing devices, as well as defeat a member of the Injustice Gang in a boss battle.

== Plot ==
The Justice League is alerted to robots of Lex Luthor's design invading Metropolis. Superman and Wonder Woman fend off the invasion and confront Luthor, who reveals the attack to be a diversion. Batman detects a worldwide pattern of ordinary citizens committing crimes and developing amnesia, suggesting brainwashing. As he pinpoints strange frequencies emanating from a volcano in Hawaii, the League is alerted to attacks on Gotham City by the Joker and Themyscira by Felix Faust, requiring the League to split into teams. The League finds that Luthor has formulated the Injustice Gang, and assigned the Joker, Faust, and Star Sapphire to guard transmitting devices. The League splits up once more in search of Luthor's command and control center. While Batman and Hawkgirl prevent Ultra-Humanite from activating a brainwashing satellite on the International Space Station, the Martian Manhunter and Flash infiltrate Shade's Russian stronghold and learn that Luthor is preparing to meet with an extraterrestrial party in Roswell, New Mexico, which Batman and the Martian Manhunter fend off. The League determines from data gathered at Roswell that Luthor's base is on the Moon, and they confront Luthor after sweeping the Earth's atmosphere for remaining satellites. Luthor reveals that he had made an arrangement with the extraterrestrials in which they would grant Luthor the League in exchange for Earth. The League defeats Luthor and escape his base before it self-destructs.

== Development and release ==
On April 29, 2002, Midway Games acquired the rights to publish video games based on characters from DC Comics' Justice League of America comic book series and the Justice League animated television series. The deal took place during a widespread industry trend of publishers acquiring licenses for comic book superheroes. Justice League: Injustice for All was developed by Saffire under the direction of Brian Christensen, with Midway's Kevin Potter and Warner Bros. Interactive Entertainment's Ames Kirshen and Adam Schwenk acting as producers. John and Andrew Nielson respectively served as lead programmer and lead artist, and co-designed the game alongside Jason Ablett. The story was written by Flint Dille, and the audio was created by Rick Bradshaw. The game was announced on August 2, 2002, and was shipped to North American retailers on November 18. A version for the PlayStation 2, Xbox, and GameCube was in development, but never released.

== Reception ==
Reception

Aggregate score
Aggregator	Score
Metacritic	56/100

Review scores
Publication	Score
AllGame	3/5
Game Informer	4.25/10
GameSpot	5/10
GameSpy	52%
GameZone	7/10
IGN	5/10
Nintendo Power	13/25
Pocket Games	7/10

Justice League: Injustice for All received "mixed or average" reviews according to review aggregator Metacritic. Jon M. Gibson of GameSpy and Frank Provo of GameSpot regarded the title as a formulaic brawler that accomplished nothing unique to set it apart from other entries in its genre, and the campaign length was deemed short, with Code Cowboy of GameZone remarking that he had "finished faster than any game [he had] played in years". Provo, along with Code Cowboy and Brett Alan Weiss of AllGame, wrote that the game would be enjoyable to young fans of the TV series, but Gibson warned that its abundance of "run-of-the-mill bullet-points" would discourage even die-hard fans, and Craig Harris of IGN concluded that the game design's lack of refinement betrayed the potential granted by the concept of controlling a group of superheroes. Andrew Reiner of Game Informer was disappointed by the game's tedious challenges and unambitious design, dismissing it as "another poorly executed side-scrolling brawler" that was "monotonous as it is mindless".

Though the reviewers of Nintendo Power considered the controls solid, Harris and Weiss criticized the collision detection as overly strict, with Harris elaborating that the characters cannot perform any corrective action in the middle of an animation. The combat was deemed basic and shallow, with the enemies and bosses being said to not require any strategy beyond using basic melee attacks. Gibson added that the low variety of enemies amplified their redundancy and predictability. Provo was pleased by the amount of abilities, but said that the level design did not create much opportunities to utilize them. Code Cowboy said the ease of combat rendered the special abilities unnecessary, a sentiment shared by Weiss. While Dan Peluso of Pocket Games regarded the pairing of team members for specific missions to be the game's most appealing characteristic, Code Cowboy and Weiss were disappointed by the inability to select the two characters to control for each level, and Harris and Weiss said the game could have been comparable to The Lost Vikings had the cooperation between characters been better implemented and the level design more inspired and imaginative. Some complained of ill-placed hazards such as falling stalactites and spike pits, which Weiss observed were exacerbated by the Game Boy Advance's small screen. Gibson and Harris got the impression that the game's production was rushed to hastily capitalize on the TV series' popularity, and Weiss concurred that the game could have used more development time to refine the level design and artificial intelligence.

While some were satisfied by the character models and animation, Gibson and Harris commented that the game's use of 3D models instead of hand-drawn sprites resulted in a loss of resemblance to the characters' animated series counterparts. Their sentiment extended to the animations, which they described as rigid and clunky, and Gibson deemed the characters' lack of visual personality "catastrophic". Provo remarked that the art style's faithfulness to the cartoon series translated into more simplistic assets than those of other Game Boy Advance titles, and added that the lack of interesting or identifiable enemy designs exemplified the game's "cookie-cutter" feeling. Code Cowboy was impressed by the level of detail for the Game Boy Advance, though he noted some issues with perspective and dimension; namely, he experienced difficulty determining which buildings could be entered, and saw no clear distinction between background and foreground elements. Weiss and Harris said the background art was uneven, with Weiss describing some as nicely detailed and others as repetitive and uninspired. Harris also spotted seams in the backgrounds, which he said resembled an "amateur wallpapering job". Gibson criticized the environments as sloppy, and cited the tiled backgrounds as evidence of a tight production deadline and a cause of navigational confusion by making several rooms look identical. The lack of animation in the cutscenes was a source of disappointment from Weiss and Gibson, though Code Cowboy was pleased that the characters' television likenesses were captured. Gibson criticized their execution as "truly lame"; although he considered the TV series' tone and character personalities to be properly represented, he dismissed the lines of dialogue as "graphically inept and emotionally defunct", and suggested that full-screen images by Warner Bros. Animation's artists with limited pan and scan motions would have sufficed.

Weiss and Code Cowboy complimented the audio, though Weiss felt the Game Boy Advance's small speaker size resulted in a slightly rough and scratchy quality. The two noted a lack of variety in the sound effects, observing that the characters' weapons and powers sounded identical. Provo regarded the audio as indistinct and uninteresting, elaborating that while the music fit the game's superhero theme with some inspiring tracks, he identified no tracks unique to the Justice League franchise. Peluso also remarked that the music bore no resemblance to the TV series' orchestrated score. Harris described the music composition as "extremely random", likening the effect to "someone just jamming on a Casio keyboard".
