= Batarang =

Fictional device used in the Batman franchise

Publication information
- Publisher: DC Comics
- First appearance: Detective Comics #31 (September 1939)
- Created by: Gardner Fox

In story information
- Type: Weapon
- Element of stories featuring: Batman

The batarang is a roughly bat-shaped throwing weapon used by the DC Comics superhero Batman. Batarangs are a staple of Batman's arsenal, appearing in every major Batman television and film adaptation to date.

== Inspiration ==
The name "Batarang" is a portmanteau of bat and boomerang, and was originally spelled "baterang".

The earliest depictions were of scalloped, metal boomerangs used to attack opponents, which quickly flew back to the thrower.

== Usage ==
Batarangs are customizable throwing weapons, based on shurikens and boomerangs, and are collapsible so that a large number of them can fit inside of Batman's utility belt. Batman uses batarang as a weapon of ranged attack, the primary alternative to firearms, which he refuses to use.

They also serve as Batman's calling cards to alert criminal elements of his presence (much like the character's antecedent Zorro, who leaves the mark "Z" to his defeated foes) and props to create an illusion to the superstitious that he commands bats when he throws them.

== Variants ==
The use of the batarang has been in a state of constant development since its early appearances.

According to The Essential Batman Encyclopedia,

"The most consistently used versions of the Batarang included ones with micro-serrated edges; a hard-impact version for stunning criminals; a remote-controlled one linked to his Utility Belt; and an aerodynamically edged model with a throwing top."

=== By Batman ===
==== Rope batarangs ====
Also known as the Batrope, rope batarangs were used as grappling hooks before the Grapple Gun's introduction.

==== Electric batarangs ====
Electric variants that deliver powerful electric shocks to whatever they come in contact with. These batarangs can incapacitate enemies or overload electronic devices.

==== Compact batarangs ====
After the 1985-1986 Crisis on Infinite Earths, Batman developed smaller batarangs with sharp edges that could disarm criminals.

==== Explosive batarangs ====
Explosive variants that explode once they hit their target.

==== Remote-controlled batarangs ====
Remote-controlled variants that let Batman fully steer the batarang via a remote control. These are used when a straight line of sight is not possible. These batarangs have cameras in them so that Batman can see where they are going.

==== Others ====
In 1946, Batman and Robin developed a "batarang gun", and then a lighter "batarang pistol" in 1947.

A 1957 story called "The 100 Batarangs of Batman!" (Detective Comics #244, June 1957) detailed the magnetic batarang, the seeing-eye batarang, the flash-bulb batarang, the bomb batarang, the rope batarang, the police whistle batarang and the mysterious Batarang X, among others.

=== Other characters and versions ===
Batgirl uses batarangs. Nightwing, a former Robin, is known to use his own modified batarangs called Wing-Dings, which are styled after a bird. Tim Drake, the third Robin, also possesses his own R-shaped shuriken.

Batwoman uses foldable S-shaped throwing weapons stored in two sets of three on her gauntlets; these can be removed and thrown by hand, launched pneumatically, or used as forearm-mounted blades.

Catman uses weapons inspired by Batman's called "catarangs".

Like Robin, Anarky, an occasional antagonist of Batman, makes use of shuriken formed after his own gimmick, the "circle-a".

A Throwing Bird—colloquially referred to as a "Birdarang"—is a roughly bird-shaped throwing weapon used by Robin as a non-lethal ranged attack alternative to firearms.

== History ==
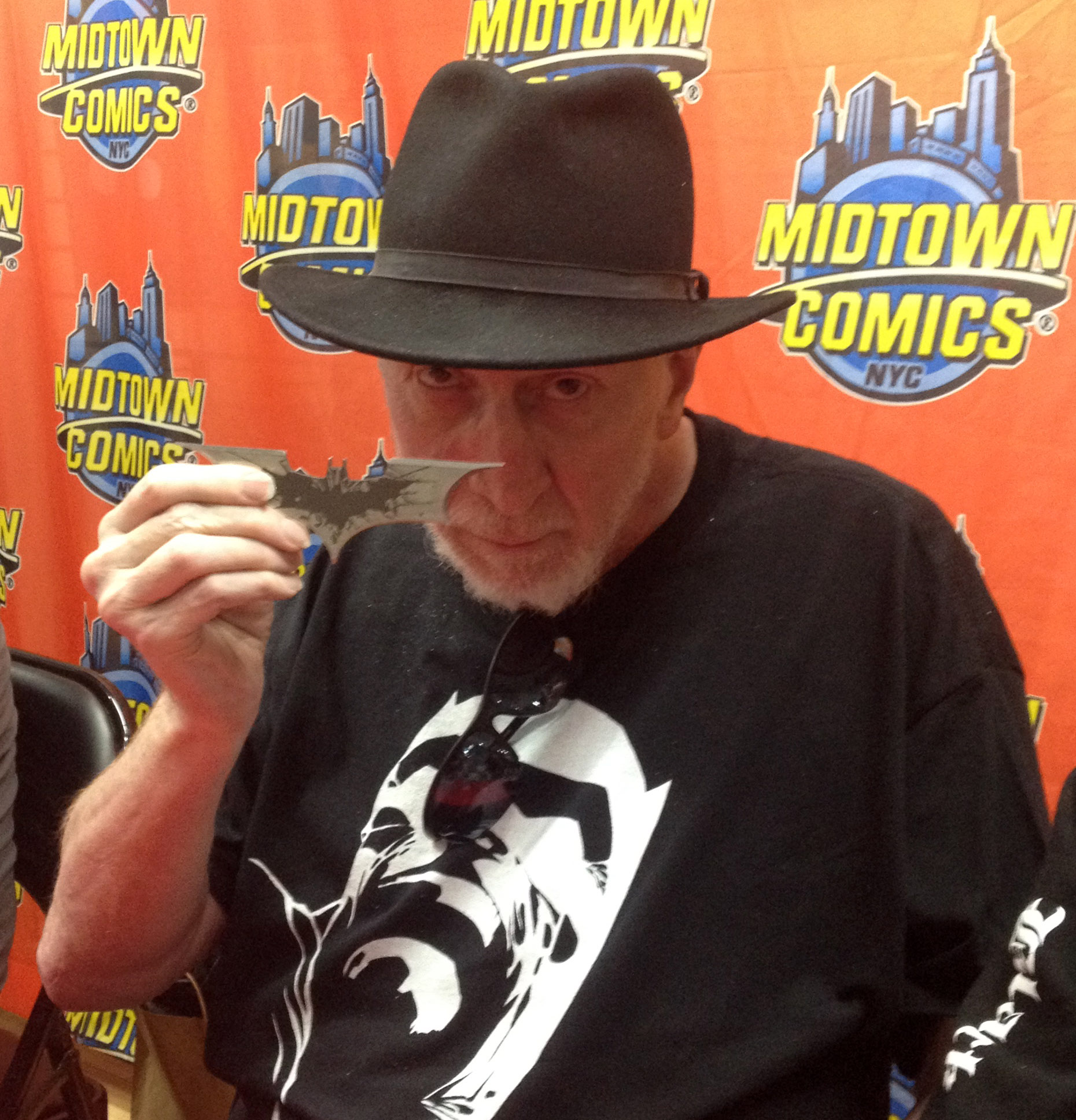
Artist and writer Frank Miller with a batarang that he has signed on Batman Day (2016).

Batarangs first appeared in Detective Comics #31 (September 1939), in the story "Batman Versus the Vampire".

A 1957 story called "The 100 Batarangs of Batman!" (Detective Comics #244, June 1957) included an "origin story" for the batarang, which was given to Batman by circus performer Lee Collins.

In Frank Miller's Batman: The Dark Knight Returns #2, illustrates one use of Batman's batarang; one criminal thought it was a bat chasing him, and when it hit his hand, revealing to be a batarang, alerting him of Batman's presence.

Later, in Batman #575 (January 2000), that during the hero's fight with the terrorist Banner, the villain thought he saw Batman grabbing two bats from a flock and throws them during their fight.

A rifle-like grappling gun first appeared in Frank Miller's Batman: The Dark Knight Returns #1. However, the now standard hand-held version of Batman's grappling gun first appeared in the 1989 Batman film. It gradually replaced the batarang and a rope in the comics after artist Norm Breyfogle introduced a grapple gun in Batman #458 in January 1991.

That tool became the standard in the subsequent animated series, comics, films, and video games such as Batman: Arkham Asylum and in Batman: Arkham City a more advanced version called the Grapnel was introduced which could be used to launch Batman into the air to glide using kinetic energy.

== In other media ==
=== Live-action television ===
- The Batarang appears in Birds of Prey. These versions are circular and bear the Birds of Prey symbol.
- The Batarang appears in the Gotham series finale "The Beginning...".
- The Batarang appears in Batwoman.

=== Live-action films ===
==== Burton/Schumacher film series ====
- The Batarang appears in Batman (1989). This version is a foldable metal bat-shaped boomerang.
- The Batarang appears in Batman Returns.
- The Batarang appears in Batman Forever. Two types are seen: one with a string and a Sonar Batarang.
- The Batarang appears in Batman & Robin.
- The Batarang appears in Batman Begins.

==== DC Extended Universe ====
- The Batarang appears in Batman v Superman: Dawn of Justice. In the film, Batman leaves batarangs near crime scenes after he has finished his job as a calling card, for example after he steals kryptonite from Lex Luthor's labs, he leaves a batarang in the place where the kryptonite was stored. He also uses in combat, however rather than disarming criminals, he uses them to stab like a shuriken.
- In Justice League, Bruce throws a batarang at Barry Allen to show him that he is aware of his super speed, and to reveal his own identity as Batman. Barry quickly dodges and catches it. After Bruce tells Barry that he is putting together a team and Barry says he will join, he asks Bruce if he can keep the batarang he caught, due to his admiration for it. Batman seems to accept that and allows him to keep it.
- A replica batarang appears in Shazam!.
- In The Flash, Batman uses a batarang to offhandedly take down a thug working for Carmine Falcone. The alternate universe Batman uses a version of the batarang throughout the film.

==== The Batman ====
Two versions of the batarang were created for the 2022 film The Batman, though ultimately only one was used in the film.

Batman's chest insignia doubles as a bat-shaped knife, which he first uses to cut through police tape and enter a crime scene and later to cut a powered electrical cable hanging precariously over rising flood waters filled with hundreds of civilians.

The other version of the Batarang created for the film was exclusively used in promotional artwork.

=== Animation ===
==== DC Animated Universe ====
The batarang appears in the DC Animated Universe series Batman: The Animated Series, Batman Beyond, and Justice League. In Batman Beyond, Terry McGinnis utilizes a type of batarang that is collapsible and come in a variety of forms including electrical versions, explosive versions to demolish obstacles, and grappling hooks.

==== Other animated series ====
- In the Teen Titans animated series, Robin uses similar modified batarangs to the adult Nightwing, referred to as "birdarangs".
- The same weapons are used by The Batman's interpretation of Robin. Robin also uses circular Batarang type weapons in the TV series Young Justice.
- In the animated series Krypto the Superdog, Robbie the Robin uses comical weapons called "beakerangs", which are miniature projectiles that contain incapacitating foam. Ace the Bat-Hound also wields more traditional Batarangs.
- In The Batman, the batarangs are mostly depicted as futuristic throwing weapons lined with fluorescent blue, and making a distinct humming noise while flying through the air. They are also portrayed as sharp enough to slice through metal pipes.
- In Batman: The Brave and the Bold, the batarangs are not shown as high tech futuristic throwing tools like in The Batman, but as simple shuriken/boomerangs.
- In the series Beware the Batman, the batarangs have a shape similar to the Nolan films, with bronze and gray coloring. Some of the batarangs employ miniaturized scanners allowing Batman to study potentially dangerous objects from afar.
- In Robot Chicken DC Comics Special III: Magical Friendship, Batman reveals to Robin that he created a Batarang out of Kryptonite which he planned to use to kill Superman if he ever turned evil. Later in the special, Batman uses the batarang against Composite Superman.

=== Animated film ===
The batarang appears in the Batman animated films Batman: Mask of the Phantasm, Batman: Year One, Batman: Under the Red Hood, Son of Batman, Batman vs. Robin, Batman: The Killing Joke, Batman: Return of the Caped Crusaders, Batman vs. Two-Face, Batman vs. Teenage Mutant Ninja Turtles, Batman: Hush, and DC League of Super-Pets.

=== Video games ===
- The Batarang was a primary weapon in Batman: The Caped Crusader. It was used to climb and swing in Batman: The Movie.
- Batman: Vengeance features regular and electrified batarangs as throwing weapons.
- Lego Batman: The Video Game features batarangs (in two different colors), which can be used by four characters; Batman, Batgirl, Robin, and Nightwing.
- In the Batman Begins video game, Batarangs were only used to interact with the environment, in order to scare henchmen.
- The Game Boy Batman game allowed the collection and use of up to three Batarangs that could be thrown simultaneously.
- In the fighting game Injustice: Gods Among Us and the sequel, Injustice 2, Batman is equipped with Batarangs, which he can throw at his opponents.
- Batman uses Batarangs as throwing weapons in Justice League: Cosmic Chaos.

==== Batman: Arkham ====
In Batman: Arkham Asylum, Batman can wield a single Batarang from the beginning, and the player has the opportunity to unlock multiple variations such as remote-controlled Batarangs and Sonic Batarangs.

In addition, the Collector's Edition of the game comes with a 14" plastic Batarang model affixed to a display base.

The Batarang appears in the sequel, Batman: Arkham City, introducing a new variation, a reverse Batarang which can loop behind an enemy and attack from behind.

Batman: Arkham Knight, the third and final installment in Rocksteady's Arkham trilogy, also features the batarang with many of the same variants and abilities seen in the previous two games. Batman also has a new Batarang called the Bat Scanner he can throw high into the air around Gotham to scan a specific area.

== Replicas ==
Toy and prop replica company NECA produced a batarang replica based in the Arkham Knight design, which can be purchased through video game retailer Gamestop.

This batarang replica can be folded at its middle hinge and rapidly opened with the press of a button, and also has a removable LED light panel.

== Cultural legacy ==
A Batarang prop from the 1997 film Batman & Robin has been donated to the Smithsonian Institution, and is in the National Museum of American History's entertainment collection.

It was donated by Warner Bros. studio chairman Barry Meyer in 2013 along with other film props, including a golden ticket from 2005's Charlie and the Chocolate Factory and models from Gremlins 2: The New Batch.

== See also ==
- Batman
- DC Universe
- Deus ex machina
