= Batman: Return of the Joker =

1991 video game

- North American NES box art
- Developer: Sunsoft (Note: Genesis version developed by Ringler Studios)
- Publisher: Sunsoft
- Designers: Yoshiaki Iwata; Tadashi Kojima
- Programmers: NES; H. Suzuki; Hirokatsu Fujii; Game Boy; Michio Okasaka; Genesis; Chris Oke
- Artists: Genesis; Lance Hutto; Karen Finch; Klee Miller; Chris Oke; Simon Finch; Ed Ringler
- Composers: NES; Naoki Kodaka; Game Boy; Manami Matsumae; Genesis; Tommy Tallarico
- Series: Batman
- Platforms: NES, Game Boy, Sega Genesis
- Release: December 20, 1991: NES; JP: December 20, 1991; NA: December 1991; EU: November 19, 1992 Game Boy; JP: March 28, 1992; NA: May 1992; EU: 1992 Genesis; NA: November 1992
- Genres: Run and gun Platform (Game Boy)
- Mode: Single-player

Batman: Return of the Joker (Note: Known in Japan as Dynamite Batman (Japanese: ダイナマイトバットマン, Hepburn: Dainamaito Battoman)) is a 1991 run and gun video game, the follow-up to Sunsoft's first Batman game on the Nintendo Entertainment System. Unlike that game, which was based on the 1989 Batman film directed by Tim Burton, Return of the Joker is entirely self-contained and based more on the modern comic book iteration of Batman, but the Batmobile and the Batwing are featured from the 1989 film. A remake of Return of the Joker, titled Batman: Revenge of the Joker, was released on the Sega Genesis by Ringler Studios in 1992. A Super NES version of Revenge of the Joker was completed but never officially released; a ROM image surfaced online in later years.

A completely different version of the game was released on the Game Boy in 1992.

== Gameplay ==
=== NES version ===
In Batman: Return of the Joker, the titular hero is on journey to the Joker's secret hide-out after called by Gotham City to find metals stolen by the Joker, one of which is highly toxic and used to build explosives for missiles. The NES version of Batman: Return of the Joker consists of seven stages, each of which have two sub-levels (except for the last stage) and a boss level (except for the second and fifth stages); from beginning to end, they are the Gotham City cathedral, the Joker's warehouse, a snowy mountain, a refinery, an underground conduit, an ammunition base, and the Island of Ha-Hacienda. Although Batman has three lives, the game has unlimited continues and stage passwords that can be accessed by pausing the game. The game's five bosses include the Ace Ranger, a Minedroid, the Master C.P.U. of the refinery, and two battles with the Joker; for regular levels, Batman's health is represented in increments, but in the boss stages, both Batman and the boss's life meters are represented in numbers.

Return of the Joker is a side-scrolling run and gun platformer. Batman's weapon is a wrist projector which the player change its type of ammunition by collecting icons throughout the levels: "C" icons for the crossbow, which shoots arrows that makes an enemy explode, "B" icons for "Batarangs", where its direction follows the movement of on-screen enemies, N for "Sonic Neutralizers" that shoots two patterns of Batarangs in a criss-cross shape, and "S" for "Shield Stars" that shoots three darts going separate directions. Batman can slide by pressing the A-button and down on the D-pad, a move that is also an attack (although it only works against some enemies). Batman can also collect energy capsules that, if eight are obtained, will make him become invincible for a few seconds.

=== Game Boy version ===
The Game Boy version, unlike the NES version where the character shoots, is only a platformer.

== Reception ==
Reception

Review scores
Publication	Score		
Publication	Game Boy	NES	Sega Genesis
AllGame		4.5/5	2.5/5
Computer and Video Games	79%		59%
Electronic Gaming Monthly	29/40	8/10, 8/10, 7/10, 6/10	
GamePro		17/20 (Note: GamePro gave the NES version a 5/5 for graphics and four 4/5 ratings for sound, gameplay, fun factor, and challenge.)	3/5
GamesMaster			68%
GameZone	78/100		
Jeuxvideo.com		15/20	
Nintendo Power	3.6/5 (Note: Nintendo Power gave the Game Boy version 3.9/5 for graphics/sound, 3.4/5 for play control, 3.5/5 for challenge, and 3.6/5 for theme/fun.)	3.85/5 (Note: Nintendo Power gave the NES version a 4.3/5 for graphics/sound, a 3.5/5 for challenge/excitement, and two 3.8/5 ratings for play control and theme/fun.)	
Official Nintendo Magazine		78%	
Total!	86%	64%	
Zero	90/100		
Game Zero		50.5/100	
Nintendo Acción		2.75/4 (Note: Nintendo Acción gave the NES version three 3/4 ratings for graphics, gameplay, and fun, and a 2/4 score for sound.)	
GB Action	83%		
N-Force	82%		
Mega			67%
Mega Drive Advanced Gaming			78%
Mean Machines Sega			68%
MegaTech			75%
Sega Force			60/100
Sega Pro			84%
Sega Zone			81/100

Award
Publication	Award
Nintendo Power	Game of the Year (nominee)

Dave Cook of Nintendo Life wrote that while Batman: Return of the Joker was "fun and challenging it doesn't feel as revolutionary as its predecessor despite being a commendable effort".

Syfy Wire, in 2017, ranked the NES version of Batman: Return of the Joker the fourth most essential DC Comics video game adaptation to play. Den of Geek ranked the Game Boy version the 22nd most underrated Game Boy game, praising its return of wall-jumping and beat 'em up mechanics of the 1989 Batman NES title, although complained about its limited continues.

In 2019, IGN ranked the game's final boss the third best video game portrayal of the Joker of all-time.

The Gamer, in 2020, claimed Return of the Joker to be the best-looking NES game ever, reasoning that the "sprites are fluid, the game's color palette is moody & atmospheric, and the backgrounds are as fleshed out as can be for an NES game". Yacht Club Games artist Nick Wozniak has named the game's Batman sprite as one of his all-time favorite in games: "As an adult, I was in shock at what I was seeing… There's only ever one or two humanoid enemies on screen because they are completely bombing the NES with the graphics. They give him a powerup where he turns gold and he shoots a bunch of guys. It's like Super Batman. They don't care".

The Gamer has also called it one of the best all-time Batman video games: "The graphics are surprisingly spritely for an early 90s game, with entertaining gameplay and an intriguing storyline helping make this game an enjoyable experience". It has also been ranked the ninth-best Batman game by Uproxx and the tenth-best by IGN Spain. In a worst-to-best list of Batman video games by The Things, Return of the Joker came in number 12: "Almost everyone who reviewed it remarked on how amazing the graphics and backgrounds were. This was 16-bit quality on 8-bit machines. The gameplay wasn't as good as the prior Batman game, but only just. Building off the '89 game, combat-focused from attacks to gadgets, giving players greater variety. A better difficulty curve was also introduced".
