= Batman (franchise) =

Portrayals of Batman outside of comic books

- Promotional image commemorating the 80th anniversary of the Batman franchise, depicting various adaptations of the character
- Created by: Bill Finger; Bob Kane
- Original work: Detective Comics #27 (March 1939)
- Owner: DC Comics
- Years: 1939–present

Print publications
- Books: Batman: The Complete History; The Batman Handbook: The Ultimate Training Manual
- Novels: Batman: Dead White; Batman: Fear Itself; Batman: Inferno; Batman: The Ultimate Evil; Enemies & Allies; Wayne of Gotham

Films and television
- Films: Batman (1943); Batman and Robin (1949); Batman (1966); Batman (1989); Batman Returns (1992); Batman: Mask of the Phantasm (1993); Batman Forever (1995); Batman & Robin (1997); Batman Begins (2005); The Dark Knight (2008); The Dark Knight Rises (2012); Batman v Superman: Dawn of Justice (2016); Suicide Squad (2016); The Lego Batman Movie (2017); Justice League (2017); Joker (2019); Zack Snyder's Justice League (2021); The Batman (2022); DC League of Super-Pets (2022); The Flash (2023); The Batman: Part II (2028)
- Television series: Batman (1966–68); Birds of Prey (2002–2003); Gotham (2014–2019); Titans (2018–2023); Batwoman (2019–2022); Gotham Knights (2023)
- Animated series: The Batman/Superman Hour (1968–69); The Adventures of Batman (1968–69); The New Adventures of Batman (1977); Batman: The Animated Series (1992–1995); The New Batman/Superman Adventures (1997–2000); Batman Beyond (1999–2002); The Batman (2004–08); Batman: The Brave and the Bold (2008–11); Beware the Batman (2013–14); Batwheels (2022–present); Batman: Caped Crusader (2024–present)

The DC Comics character Batman has been adapted into various media including film, radio, television, and video games, as well as numerous merchandising items. The Batman franchise has become one of the highest-grossing media franchises of all time.

== Film ==
Actors who have played Batman in live-action: (top) Lewis Wilson, Robert Lowery, Adam West, Michael Keaton, (middle) Kevin Conroy (as Bruce Wayne), Val Kilmer, George Clooney, Christian Bale, (bottom) Ben Affleck, David Mazouz, Iain Glen (as Bruce Wayne), and Robert Pattinson.

=== Live-action ===
A number of Batman theatrical films have been made. There have also been several attempted projects during the hiatus between Batman & Robin and Batman Begins.

==== Serials ====
- 1943: Batman; 15 chapters starring Lewis Wilson as Batman and Douglas Croft as Robin
- 1949: Batman and Robin; 15 chapters starring Robert Lowery as Batman and Johnny Duncan as Robin

==== Batman ====
In 1966, a Batman feature film based on the contemporaneous Batman television series was released. It starred Adam West as Batman, Burt Ward as Robin, Cesar Romero as the Joker, Burgess Meredith as the Penguin, Frank Gorshin as the Riddler, and Lee Meriwether as Catwoman.

==== Tim Burton and Joel Schumacher series ====
	Films			
	Batman	Batman Returns	Batman Forever	Batman & Robin
	1989	1992	1995	1997
Director	Tim Burton		Joel Schumacher	
Producer(s)	Jon Peters; Peter Guber	Denise Di Novi; Tim Burton	Tim Burton; Peter MacGregor-Scott	Peter MacGregor-Scott
Screenwriter(s)	Warren Skaaren; Sam Hamm	Daniel Waters	Lee Batchler; Janet Scott Batchler; Akiva Goldsman	Akiva Goldsman
Story by	Sam Hamm	Daniel Waters; Sam Hamm	Lee Batchler; Janet Scott Batchler	Akiva Goldsman
Cinematographer	Roger Pratt	Stefan Czapsky	Stephen Goldblatt	
Composer	Danny Elfman		Elliot Goldenthal	
Editor(s)	Ray Lovejoy	Chris Lebenzon	Dennis Virkler	Dennis Virkler; Mark Stevens
Batman actor	Michael Keaton		Val Kilmer	George Clooney

==== The Dark Knight Trilogy ====
	Films		
	Batman Begins	The Dark Knight	The Dark Knight Rises
	2005	2008	2012
Director	Christopher Nolan		
Producers	Charles Roven; Emma Thomas; Larry Franco	Emma Thomas; Charles Roven; Christopher Nolan	
Screenwriter(s)	Christopher Nolan; David S. Goyer	Jonathan Nolan; Christopher Nolan	
Story by	David S. Goyer	Christopher Nolan; David S. Goyer	
Composer(s)	Hans Zimmer; James Newton Howard		Hans Zimmer
Cinematographer	Wally Pfister		
Editor(s)	Lee Smith		
Batman actor	Christian Bale		

==== DC Extended Universe ====
Occupation	DCEU films				
Occupation	Batman v Superman: Dawn of Justice	Suicide Squad	Justice League	Zack Snyder's Justice League	The Flash
Occupation	2016	2016	2017	2021	2023
Director	Zack Snyder	David Ayer	Zack Snyder (Original); Joss Whedon (Reshoots)	Zack Snyder	Andy Muschietti
Producers	Charles Roven; Deborah Snyder	Charles Roven; Richard Suckle	Charles Roven; Deborah Snyder; Jon Berg; Geoff Johns	Charles Roven; Deborah Snyder	Michael Disco; Barbara Muschietti
Screenwriter(s)	Chris Terrio; David S. Goyer	David Ayer	Chris Terrio; Joss Whedon	Chris Terrio	Christina Hodson
Story by	Chris Terrio; David S. Goyer	David Ayer	Chris Terrio and Zack Snyder	Chris Terrio, Zack Snyder and Will Beall	John Francis Daley; Jonathan Goldstein; Joby Harold
Composer(s)	Hans Zimmer; Junkie XL	Steven Price	Danny Elfman	Junkie XL	Benjamin Wallfisch
Cinematographer	Larry Fong	Roman Vasyanov	Fabian Wagner	Fabian Wagner	Henry Braham
Editor(s)	David Brenner	John Gilroy	David Brenner; Richard Pearson; Martin Walsh	David Brenner	Paul Machliss
Batman actor	Ben Affleck	Ben Affleck	Ben Affleck	Ben Affleck	Ben Affleck, Michael Keaton, George Clooney

==== The Batman Epic Crime Saga ====
Occupation	Films	
Occupation	The Batman	The Batman: Part II
Occupation	2022	2028
Director	Matt Reeves	Matt Reeves
Producers	Dylan Clark; Matt Reeves	Dylan Clark; Matt Reeves; Lynn Harris; Peter Safran; James Gunn
Screenwriter(s)	Peter Craig; Matt Reeves	Matt Reeves; Mattson Tomlin
Composer(s)	Michael Giacchino	Michael Giacchino
Cinematographer	Greig Fraser	Erik Messerschmidt
Editor(s)	William Hoy; Tyler Nelson	TBA
Batman actor	Robert Pattinson	Robert Pattinson

=== Other live-action Batman film appearances ===
- Batman makes a cameo appearance in Looney Tunes: Back in Action.
- Batman makes a cameo appearance in Ready Player One.
- Batman makes a cameo appearance in Space Jam: A New Legacy.

=== Animation ===
==== Solo films ====
- Batman appears in Batman: Mask of the Phantasm, voiced by Kevin Conroy.
- Batman appears in Batman & Mr. Freeze: SubZero, voiced again by Kevin Conroy.
- Bruce Wayne appears in Batman Beyond: Return of the Joker, voiced again by Kevin Conroy.
- Batman appears in Batman: Mystery of the Batwoman, voiced again by Kevin Conroy.
- Batman appears in The Batman vs. Dracula, voiced by Rino Romano.
- Batman appears in Batman: Gotham Knight, voiced again by Kevin Conroy.
- Batman appears in Batman: Under the Red Hood, voiced by Bruce Greenwood.
- Batman appears in Batman: Year One, voiced by Ben McKenzie.
- Batman appears in Batman: The Dark Knight Returns, voiced by Peter Weller.
- Batman appears in Lego Batman: The Movie – DC Super Heroes Unite, voiced by Troy Baker.
- Batman appears in the DC Animated Movie Universe (DCAMU) films Son of Batman, Batman vs. Robin, Batman: Bad Blood and Batman: Hush, voiced primarily by Jason O'Mara and by Griffin Gluck as a child.
- Batman appears in Batman: Assault on Arkham, voiced again by Kevin Conroy.
- Batman appears in the Batman Unlimited film series, voiced by Roger Craig Smith.
- Batman appears in Batman: The Killing Joke, voiced again by Kevin Conroy.
- Batman appears in Batman: Return of the Caped Crusaders, voiced again by Adam West.
- Batman appears in Batman and Harley Quinn, voiced again by Kevin Conroy.
- Batman appears in Batman vs. Two-Face, voiced posthumously by Adam West.
- Batman appears in Batman: Gotham by Gaslight, voiced by Bruce Greenwood.
- Batman appears in Batman Ninja, voiced by Kōichi Yamadera and Roger Craig Smith in the Japanese and English versions respectively.
- Batman appears in Lego DC Batman: Family Matters, voiced again by Troy Baker.
- Batman appears in Batman: Death in the Family, voiced again by Bruce Greenwood as an adult and by Nick Carson as a child.
- Batman appears in Batman: Soul of the Dragon, voiced by David Giuntoli.
- Batman appears in Batman: The Long Halloween, voiced primarily by Jensen Ackles and by Zach Callison as a child.
- Batman appears in Batman: The Doom That Came to Gotham, voiced primarily by David Giuntoli and by Jason Marsden as a child.
- Batman appears in Merry Little Batman, voiced by Luke Wilson.
- Batman appears in Batman Ninja vs. Yakuza League, voiced by Kōichi Yamadera and Joe Daniels in the Japanese and English versions respectively.
- Batman appears in Batman: Knightfall, voiced by Anson Mount.

==== Team-ups ====
- Batman appears in Justice League: The New Frontier, voiced by Jeremy Sisto.
- Batman appears in Superman/Batman: Public Enemies, voiced again by Kevin Conroy.
- Batman appears in Justice League: Crisis on Two Earths, voiced by William Baldwin.
- Batman appears in Superman/Batman: Apocalypse, voiced again by Kevin Conroy.
- Batman appears in Justice League: Doom, voiced again by Kevin Conroy.
- Batman and the Flashpoint timeline Batman appear in Justice League: The Flashpoint Paradox, respectively voiced by Kevin Conroy and Kevin McKidd.
- Batman appears in JLA Adventures: Trapped in Time, voiced by Diedrich Bader.
- Batman appears in films set in the DC Animated Movie Universe (DCAMU), voiced by Jason O'Mara.
- Batman appears in the Lego DC Comics film series, voiced by Troy Baker.
- An alternate universe variant of Batman, with elements of Man-Bat, appears in Justice League: Gods and Monsters, voiced by Michael C. Hall.
- Batman appears in Scooby-Doo! & Batman: The Brave and the Bold, voiced again by Diedrich Bader.
- Batman appears in Teen Titans Go! To the Movies, voiced primarily by Jimmy Kimmel and by Nicolas Cage's son Kal-El as a child.
- Batman appears in Justice League vs. the Fatal Five, voiced by Kevin Conroy.
- Batman appears in Batman vs. Teenage Mutant Ninja Turtles, voiced again by Troy Baker.
- Batman appears in Superman: Red Son, voiced again by Roger Craig Smith.
- Batman appears in Injustice, voiced again by Anson Mount.
- Batman appears in Teen Titans Go! & DC Super Hero Girls: Mayhem in the Multiverse, voiced by Keith Ferguson.
- Batman appears in DC League of Super-Pets, voiced by Keanu Reeves.
- Batman appears in Batman and Superman: Battle of the Super Sons, voiced again by Troy Baker.
- Batman appears in the Tomorrowverse films Legion of Super-Heroes and Justice League: Crisis on Infinite Earths, voiced by Jensen Ackles. Kevin Conroy reprises his role as Batman in the latter film.
- Batman appears in the two-part film Justice League x RWBY: Super Heroes & Huntsmen, voiced by Nat Wolff in Part One and again by Troy Baker in Part Two.

==== Web series ====
- The Justice League: Gods and Monsters incarnation of Batman appears in Justice League: Gods and Monsters Chronicles, with Michael C. Hall reprising the role.
- Batman appears in the Batman Unlimited web series, voiced again by Roger Craig Smith.
- Batman appears in DC Heroes United, voiced by Aleks Le.

==== Other ====
- Batman appears in The Lego Movie franchise, voiced by Will Arnett.
- Batman makes a minor appearance in the credits of Shazam!.
- The DC Extended Universe incarnation of Batman appears in Chip 'n Dale: Rescue Rangers, voiced by Jorma Taccone.

=== Canceled Batman animated films ===
- Following the success of the Fleischer Superman cartoons, Fleischer Studios communicated with DC Comics over the possibility of adapting Batman. The communication got to the point of budget discussions as illustrated in a letter dated January 25, 1942, and reproduced in longtime Batman executive producer, Michael E. Uslan's 2011 memoir, The Boy Who Loved Batman. However, it is unknown how far the production of this project went before being abandoned.
- A second Batman Beyond film was planned for release, but was scrapped due to the controversy surrounding Batman Beyond: Return of the Joker. Another mention of Batman Beyond film was in 2017 by Bruce Timm and James Tucker, the latter saying that discussions about a possible Batman Beyond film occurred several times at the studio.
- After the success of Batman & Mr. Freeze: Subzero, Warner Bros. greenlighted the production of a third installment, entitled Batman: Arkham. Boyd Kirkland, the director of this film, was attached to write and direct. The film would have Batman and Robin facing off against a collection of Arkham Asylum escapees, in addition to Batman finding himself falling in love with a new love interest, planned to be voiced by Angie Harmon. The main cast of Batman: The Animated Series was attached to reprise their roles. Steven E. Gordon also drew some art concept for the film. The film was ultimately cancelled in favor of Batman Beyond: Return of the Joker (which also featured Harmon), while Batman: Arkham eventually became a successful video game series by Rocksteady.
- A second film of The Batman titled The Batman vs. Hush that featured Hush as the main villain along with the Joker, the Penguin, the Riddler, Catwoman and Clayface was planned for a long time. The film ended up being scrapped. Before its cancellation, producer Alan Burnett had hopes of making one or two more DTV films based on The Batman. A similar film based on Batman: Hush ultimately came out in 2019 as part of the DC Animated Movie Universe.
- In 2015, Bruce Timm expressed interest in an animated adaptation of the Batman R.I.P. storyline.
- In a 2016 interview, Jay Oliva mentioned that he had plans to make a sequel to Batman: Assault on Arkham, but following his departure from Warner Bros. Animation, the project was pulled off.
- Writer J. M. DeMatteis was interested in adaptation of his Batman story arc Going Sane set in the DC Animated Movie Universe.

== Television ==
=== Live-action ===
- Batman appears in a self-titled series (1966), portrayed by Adam West.
- Batman appears in Legends of the Superheroes, portrayed again by Adam West.
- Batman appears in Birds of Prey.
- A young Bruce Wayne appears in Gotham, portrayed by David Mazouz.
- Batman appears in Titans, portrayed by Iain Glen. In his initial appearance in the first season, he is portrayed by stunt doubles Alain Moussi and Maxim Savarias.
- Batman appears in the Arrowverse series Batwoman, portrayed by Warren Christie. An alternate universe variant of Bruce Wayne appears in the crossover event "Crisis on Infinite Earths", portrayed by Kevin Conroy.
- Batman appears in the pilot episode of Gotham Knights, portrayed by David Miller.

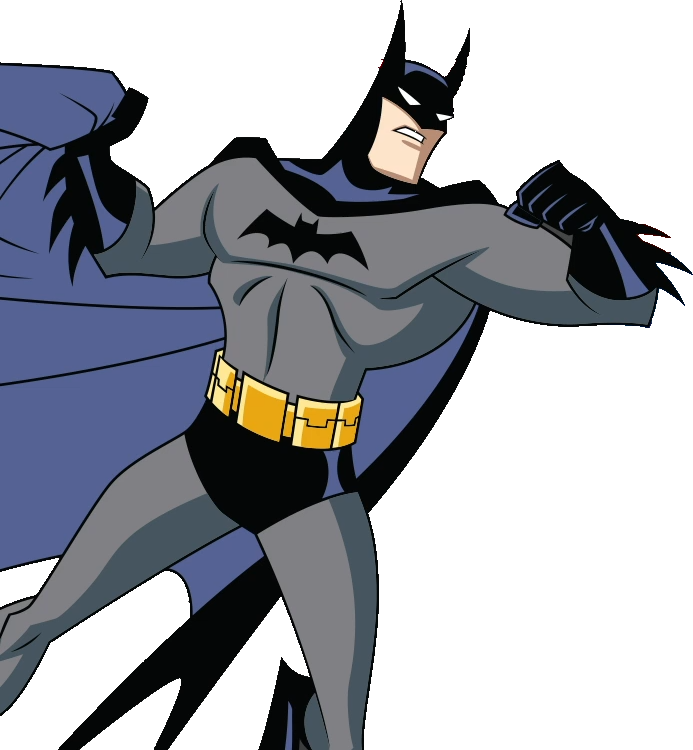
Batman as he appears in the DCAU shows Justice League and Justice League Unlimited.

=== Animation ===
- Batman appears in The Adventures of Batman, voiced by Olan Soule.
- Batman appears in The New Adventures of Batman, voiced by Adam West.
- Batman appears in the Super Friends franchise, voiced primarily by Olan Soule and by Adam West in the last two series, Super Friends: The Legendary Super Powers Show and The Super Powers Team: Galactic Guardians.
- Batman appears in series set in the DC Animated Universe (DCAU), voiced by Kevin Conroy and by Kyle Alcazar as a child.
- Batman appears in The Batman, voiced by Rino Romano.
- Batman appears in Batman: The Brave and the Bold, voiced by Diedrich Bader. Additionally, Zachary Gordon voices him as a child, while Corey Burton and Frank Welker voice parody versions of Batman in the episode "Bat-Mite Presents: Batman's Strangest Cases!".
- Batman appears in Beware the Batman, voiced primarily by Anthony Ruivivar and by Jason Marsden as a child.
- Batman appears in Justice League Action, voiced primarily by Kevin Conroy and by Tara Strong as a child.
- Batman appears in Batwheels, voiced by Ethan Hawke.
- Batman appears in Batman: Caped Crusader, voiced primarily by Hamish Linklater and by Santino Barnard as a child.
- Batman appears in Bat-Fam voiced by Luke Wilson. The series was released on Amazon Prime Video in 2025.

==== Other appearances ====
- Batman appears in Superman, voiced by Olan Soule.
- Batman appears in Sesame Street, voiced again by Olan Soule.
- Batman appears in The New Scooby-Doo Movies, voiced again by Olan Soule.
- Batman appears in the Tiny Toon Adventures episode "Gang Busters", voiced by Charlie Adler.
- Batman makes a cameo appearance in the Freakazoid! episode "Dance of Doom".
- Batman appears as a skeleton in a vision in the episode "Hourglass" from the first season of Smallville.
- Spruce Wayne / Caped Crusader, a parody of Batman, appears in the Animaniacs episode "Boo Wonder", voiced by Adam West.
- Batman appears in The Simpsons episode "Large Marge", voiced again by Adam West.
- Batman makes a cameo appearance in the Teen Titans episode "Haunted".
- Batman appears in DC Super Friends: The Joker's Playhouse, voiced by Daran Norris.
- Batman appears in Young Justice, voiced again by Bruce Greenwood.
- Batman appears in Mad, voiced variously by Kevin Shinick, Diedrich Bader, Hugh Davidson, and Chris Cox.
- Batman appears in Robot Chicken, voiced by Seth Green.
- Batman makes a cameo appearance in the New Teen Titans short "Red X Unmasked", voiced by Kevin Michael Richardson. Richardson also voiced Batman in the Plastic Man short "The Bat and the Eel" and the Riddler short "Riddle Me This!".
- Batman makes primarily non-speaking appearances in Teen Titans Go!, voiced again by Kevin Conroy in the episode "Real Orangins". Additionally, the Batman: The Brave and the Bold incarnation of the character appears in the episode "The Academy" via archival footage.
- Batman appears in DC Super Friends, voiced by Mark Gagliardi.
- The Lego Movie incarnation of Batman appears in the Unikitty! episode "BatKitty", voiced again by Will Arnett.
- Batman appears in DC Super Hero Girls, voiced by Keith Ferguson.
- Batman appears in Harley Quinn, voiced again by Diedrich Bader.
- Batman appears in the Scooby-Doo and Guess Who? episode "What a Night, For a Dark Knight!", voiced again by Kevin Conroy.
- Batman makes cameo appearances in the Creature Commandos episodes "Chasing Squirrels" and "Priyatel Skelet".

=== Canceled Batman animated series ===
- An animated series that reimagines Batman characters as high school students, Gotham High, was in development in the late 2000s and early 2010s. A similar idea was used for the DC Super Hero Girls 2015 shorts and the 2019 animated series.
- Both in the mid- and late 2000s, an animated TV show based on the "No Man's Land" storyline was put in development by producer James Tucker. Character designer Coran Stone worked on the project and made designs for the first version, but the project was ultimately scrapped for being "too dark", which led to Warner Bros. Animation and Cartoon Network focusing on Batman: The Brave and the Bold instead. Another attempt was made and some artwork was made as well, but the project was also cancelled like the first attempt.
- There were plans to make an animated series featuring Batman and Superman. It would have been an origin story.

== Radio ==
Beginning in March 1945, Batman and Robin made regular appearances on the radio drama The Adventures of Superman on the Mutual Broadcasting System, including solo stories when series star Bud Collyer had time off. Batman was voiced by Matt Crowley, Stacy Harris and Gary Merrill, with Ronald Liss as Robin.

Efforts were later made to launch a Batman radio series in 1943 and again in 1950, but neither came to fruition. The 1943 pilot "The Case of the Drowning Seal" was scripted with Scott Douglas as Batman; if the script was recorded, no copy survives. The September 1950 pilot for The Batman Mystery Club was recorded with Richard Devon as Batman and Ronald Liss as Robin.

In 1989, an original radio drama, Batman: The Lazarus Syndrome, was produced by Dirk Maggs for BBC Radio 4. Bob Sessions was the voice of Batman.

A second Maggs production aired on BBC Radio 1 in 1994, this time adapting the comic book storyline Batman: Knightfall. It was adapted, produced and directed by Maggs—with music composed by Mark Russell—who had also made Superman: Doomsday & Beyond on BBC Radio 5. This show, however, was not commissioned of its own, but rather to be three-minute episodes on the Mark Goodier Show. This meant it was written with a sense of immediacy, having to make an instant effect, and each three-minute segment contains a major plot development or sound effect stunt and ends on a cliffhanger. DC acknowledged the effort in an issue, Shadow of the Bat, by having villains jump past a sign reading "Dirk Maggs Radio". Michael Gough reprised the role of Alfred Pennyworth from the Burton/Schumacher film series.

== Newspaper ==
From 1943 to 1946, Batman and Robin appeared in a syndicated daily newspaper comic strip produced by the McClure Syndicate. Other versions appeared in 1953, 1966, and 1989. The original run is collected in the book Batman: The Dailies. One more comic strip series ran briefly after the success of the 1989 film.

== Books ==
Batman appears in a novel by cyberpunk/horror novelist John Shirley, titled Batman: Dead White, from Del Rey. Many other novels and short story collections featuring Batman have been published over the years, including novelizations of each of the recent movies (such as Batman and The Dark Knight Rises) and many of the comic book arcs.

There are also several more scholarly works, aimed at either Batman's history or art, such as Les Daniels' Batman: The Complete History, Will Brooker's Batman Unmasked: Analysing a Cultural Icon and compilations such as Batman: Cover to Cover: The Greatest Comic Book Covers of the Dark Knight. In 2004, The Batman Handbook: The Ultimate Training Manual, written by Scott Beatty was published by Quirk Books (ISBN 1-59474-023-2). Written in the same style as The Worst-Case Scenario Survival Handbook series, the book explained the basics on how to be Batman. Among the skills included in the book are "How to Train a Sidekick", "How to Execute a Backflip", "How to Throw a Grappling Hook", and "How to Survive a Poison Gas Attack". Finally, there are of course countless sticker, coloring, activity, and other children's books featuring the Dark Knight.

== International comics ==
- Batman: Child of Dreams by Kia Asamiya—manga
- Batman: Death Mask by Yoshinori Natsume—manga
- Bat-Manga!: The Secret History of Batman in Japan by Jiro Kuwata—manga
- Batman trong Hőtữ Thần by Nguyễn Th—Vietnamese comics
- Batman and the Justice League by Shiori Teshirogi—manga
- Batman: The World—an anthology featuring creative teams from around the world.
- Batman: Justice Buster by Eiichi Shimizu & Tomohiro Shimoguchi—manga

== Novelty singles ==
Several musical singles featuring cast members of the television show singing in-character were released in 1966: Burgess Meredith as the Penguin in "The Capture" and "The Escape", Frank Gorshin as the Riddler in "The Riddler", and Adam West as Batman in "Miranda". In 1976 West performed a pair of novelty songs, "The Story of Batman" and "Batman and Robin", for Target Records. All six of these recordings (sans the b-sides to Gorshin and West's singles) were later included on the 1997 compilation, Batmania: Songs Inspired by Batman TV Series.

In 1966, Burt Ward also recorded a limited "disc jokey only" release with Frank Zappa called "Boy Wonder, I Love You".

Also in 1966, British novelty group The Scaffold produced a single called "Goodbat Nightman" (lyrics by Roger McGough, who "has written several poems" about Batman and Robin).

== Audio drama ==
Following the popularity of the Adam West television series, a pair of LPs were released in 1966 on MGM's "Leo the Lion" label with Jack Curtis portraying Batman and Ron Liss as Robin. The recordings proved popular due to their combination of dramatization and the Batman television theme music. More than 100,000 copies were shipped soon after the first LP was released. Each album contained three dramatizations, including stories adapted from Batman comic books:

- The Official Adventures of Batman & Robin:
  - The Legend of Batman and Robin
  - The Penguin's Plunder
  - The Joker's Revenge
- More Official Adventures of Batman & Robin:
  - The Marriage of Batman and Batwoman
  - The Fake Boy Wonder
  - When Batman Became a Coward

Furthermore, in 1966, Batman and Robin appeared on an LP produced by Golden Records dramatising Batman #73.

Throughout the 1970s Batman was the subject of a number of Power Records Book-and-record sets, as well as records unaccompanied by books:

45 rpm book and record sets:

- Batman: Stacked Cards
- Batman: Robin Meets Man-Bat

7" 33 1/3 rpm records (no comic):

- Batman: If Music be the Food of Death
- Batman: The Scarecrow's Mirages
- Batman: Catwoman's Revenge (1976)

33 1/3 rpm 12 book and record sets:

- Batman: Gorilla City & Mystery of the Scarecrow Corpse
- Batman (Collects Stacked Cards, The Scarecrow's Mirage, Challenge of the Catwoman, If Music Be the Food of Death)
- Batman (Collects Robin Meets Man Bat, Gorilla City, Mystery of the Scarecrow Corpse, The Catwoman's Revenge)
- A Super Hero Christmas (segment Batman: Christmas Carol Caper)

The 1980 mini-series, The Untold Legend of the Batman was available in a special "MPI Audio Edition." Each of the three issues were accompanied by an audio cassette containing a performance of the text of the issue, with musical cues.

As part of its DC Superheroes collection, in 1982 Fisher-Price released Batman: The Case of the Laughing Sphinx, an audio cassette accompanied by a hard back illustrated book.

In 1996, Time Warner Records released Batman: Legends of Robin, an audio dramatisation of the issues of the comics featuring Robin in some form or another, which also featured Mark Hamill reprising his role as the Joker.

In 2007, the audiobook publisher GraphicAudio licensed DC Comics properties to adapt as audiodramas. They have produced three adaptations of Batman novels: Batman: Dead White by John Shirley, Batman: Inferno by Alex Irvine, and Alan Grant's Batman: The Stone King. Batman also appears as a supporting cast member in the GraphicAudio's adaptations of Crisis on Infinite Earths, Infinite Crisis and JLA: Exterminators.

=== Podcasts ===
In 2020, it was announced that David Goyer had signed a deal to create an audio drama podcast for Spotify called Batman Unburied. The 2022 series stars Winston Duke as Bruce Wayne and Jason Isaacs as Alfred. The supporting cast includes Hasan Minhaj, Gina Rodriguez, Sam Witwer, Emmy Raver-Lampman, Jessica Marie Garcia, Jim Pirri, Lance Reddick, Toks Olagundoye, John Rhys-Davies and Ashly Burch.

Batman: The Audio Adventures is a comedic radio drama podcast series featuring the DC Comics character Batman. The 2021 show, DC's first scripted podcast, is produced by DC Entertainment, Blue Ribbon Content and HBO Max. The series is meant to be an homage to the original 1966 Batman TV series as well as the 1990s Batman: The Animated Series. It is directed and written by Dennis McNicholas, a writer for Saturday Night Live. Production companies involved with the series were slated to consist of Insurrection Media and WarnerMedia. The series was executive produced by Kiliaen Van Rensselaer, Deborah Henderson, and Jon Berg.

Harley Quinn and The Joker: Sound Mind is the second podcast released under the partnership between Spotify and Warner Bros. Released in early 2023, it features Christina Ricci as Harley Quinn and Billy Magnussen as The Joker. Justin Hartley also appears voicing Bruce Wayne. In late 2023, the third Spotify–Warner Batman podcast, The Riddler: Secrets in the Dark, is scheduled for release. The podcast features an odd-couple team-up between Batman and The Riddler and stars Hasan Minhaj reprising his role from Batman Unburied, and Colman Domingo replacing Winston Duke as Batman.

Batman himself has most recently appeared in a podcast entitled DC High Volume: Batman, which, in contrast to the examples mentioned above, adapts story arcs from the comics, notably Year One, The Long Halloween and Dark Victory.

== Video games ==
Video games featuring Batman include:

- Batman (1986) for the ZX Spectrum, MSX and Amstrad PCW; now known as Batman 3D
- Batman: The Caped Crusader (1988) for various 8-bit and 16-bit platforms
- Batman (1989) for Mega Drive/Genesis, Nintendo Entertainment System (NES), Lynx, Amiga, ZX Spectrum, and other platforms. (In October 1989, the Amiga 500 was bundled with this game as part of the Batman Pack, which was sold in the United Kingdom and was a phenomenal success)
- Batman (1990) for Arcade: Based on the 1989 film
- Batman: Return of the Joker (1991) for Nintendo Entertainment System (NES) and Game Boy
- Batman Returns (1993) for Nintendo Entertainment System (NES), Super NES, Mega Drive/Genesis, Mega CD/Sega CD, Game Gear, and Atari Lynx
- Batman: The Animated Series (1993) for Game Boy
- Batman & Robin: The Animated Series (1993) for Game Gear
- The Adventures of Batman & Robin (1994) for Super NES, Mega Drive/Genesis, Mega CD/Sega CD, and Game Gear
- Batman Forever (1996) for Super NES, Game Boy, Mega Drive/Genesis, and Game Gear
- Batman Forever: The Arcade Game (1996) for Arcade, PlayStation and Sega Saturn, with Batman voiced by Mark Schaefgen.
- Batman & Robin (1997) for Game.com and the PlayStation
- Batman Beyond: Return of the Joker (2000) for Nintendo 64 and the PlayStation
- Batman: Chaos in Gotham (2001) for Game Boy Color
- Batman: Gotham City Racer (2001) A racing game for PlayStation
- Batman: Vengeance (2001) for GameCube, PlayStation 2, PC, Game Boy Advance and Xbox
- Batman: Dark Tomorrow (2003) for Xbox and GameCube (voiced by Julian Fletcher)
- Batman: Rise of Sin Tzu (2004) for PlayStation 2, Xbox, GameCube, and Game Boy Advance, with Batman voiced by Kevin Conroy.
- Batman Begins (2005) for PlayStation 2, Xbox, GameCube and Game Boy Advance (2005)
- Batman: The Brave and the Bold – The Videogame (2010) for Wii and Nintendo DS: Based on the television series of the same name (voiced by Diedrich Bader)
- Gotham City Impostors (2012) for PlayStation 3, Xbox 360 and Windows: A downloadable multi-player first-person shooter game via PlayStation Network, Xbox Live Arcade and Games for Windows Live; a "team deathmatch" game, with one team dressed like Batman and the other dressed like The Joker
- The Dark Knight Rises (2012) for iOS: An adaptation of the film of the same name, where Batman is voiced by Sean Schemmel.
- Batman: The Telltale Series (2016) for Windows, PlayStation 3, PlayStation 4, Xbox 360, Xbox One, iOS, Android, and Nintendo Switch: An episodic adventure game. Batman is voiced by Troy Baker and by Cole Sand as a child.
- Batman: The Enemy Within (2017) for Windows, MacOS, PlayStation 4, Xbox One, iOS, Android, and Nintendo Switch: The sequel to Batman: The Telltale Series (voiced by Troy Baker).

=== Lego: Batman ===
- Lego Batman: The Video Game (2008): a video game in the style of Lego Star Wars based on the LEGO Batman toyline (vocals by Steve Blum)
- Lego Batman 2: DC Super Heroes (2012): the sequel to Lego Batman: The Video Game (voiced by Troy Baker)
- The Lego Movie Videogame (2014): A Lego-themed version of Batman appears, with cutscenes featuring archive footage of Will Arnett from The Lego Movie, while his voice in gameplay mode is provided by Jim Meskimen.
- Lego Batman 3: Beyond Gotham (2014): the sequel to Lego Batman 2: DC Super Heroes (voiced by Troy Baker).
- Lego Dimensions (2015): Troy Baker reprises Batman in this multi-franchise game. The Lego Movie version also appears in this version voiced by Will Arnett. Batman is one of the three main heroes alongside The Lego Movie's Wyldstyle and Gandalf of The Lord of the Rings as he works with them to rescue Robin from Lord Vortech. Additional content also includes an adaptation of The Lego Batman Movie.
- Lego DC Super-Villains (2018): Batman appears as a playable character, with Kevin Conroy now assuming his reprisal from Baker.
- The Lego Movie 2 Videogame (2019): A Lego-themed version of Batman appears, with Will Arnett reprising his role.
- Lego Batman: Legacy of the Dark Knight (2026): A video game based on the various interpretations of the character (voiced by Shai Matheson).

=== Batman Arkham ===
Batman appears in the Batman: Arkham series. He is voiced by Kevin Conroy in Batman: Arkham Asylum, Batman: Arkham City, Batman: Arkham Knight, Batman: Arkham VR, and Suicide Squad: Kill the Justice League and by Roger Craig Smith in Batman: Arkham Origins, Batman: Arkham Origins Blackgate, and Batman: Arkham Shadow. Both Kimberly Brooks and Max Mitchell have portrayed Bruce Wayne as a child respectively in Asylum and Shadow.

=== Other DC Games ===
- Justice League Task Force (1995) for Super NES and Mega Drive/Genesis: A fighting game featuring several DC characters, including Batman.
- Justice League: Injustice for All (2002) for Game Boy Advance: A side-scrolling action game featuring Batman as a playable character.
- Justice League: Chronicles (2003) for Game Boy Advance: An action game featuring Batman as a playable character.
- Justice League Heroes (2006) for Xbox, PlayStation 2, PlayStation Portable and Nintendo DS (voiced by Ron Perlman)
- Mortal Kombat vs. DC Universe (2008) for PlayStation 3 Xbox 360: A crossover fighting game featuring characters from DC Comics and Mortal Kombat (voiced by David Gazzana).
- DC Universe Online for PC, PlayStation 3, PlayStation 4, and Xbox One: A MMORPG where Batman, among others, trains new player-controlled heroes (voiced again by Kevin Conroy).
- Injustice: Gods Among Us (2013) for Xbox 360, PlayStation 3, PlayStation 4, Wii U, and Windows: A fighting game featuring several DC characters, including Batman (voiced again by Kevin Conroy)
- Scribblenauts Unmasked: A DC Comics Adventure (2013) for Wii U, Nintendo 3DS, Microsoft Windows, Nintendo Switch, PlayStation 4, and Xbox One: A puzzle adventure game featuring Batman as a non-playable character.
- Young Justice: Legacy (2013) for Nintendo 3DS, PlayStation 3, Xbox 360, Microsoft Windows: An action-adventure game featuring Batman as a non-playable character, voiced again by Bruce Greenwood.
- Injustice 2 (2017) for PlayStation 4 and Xbox One: the sequel to Injustice: Gods Among Us (voiced again by Kevin Conroy)
- Justice League VR: The Complete Experience (2017) features a driving, shooting level with the player taking control of Batman and the Batmobile to destroy simulated tanks in Gotham.
- DC Unchained (2018) for Android: A fighting game featuring several DC characters, including Batman.
- Batman appears in DC Battle Arena, voiced by Christopher Escalante.
- Gotham Knights (2022) for PlayStation 5, Xbox Series X and PC: A video game based on Batman's closest allies. Bruce Wayne appears in the announcement trailer for the game, voiced by Michael Antonakos.

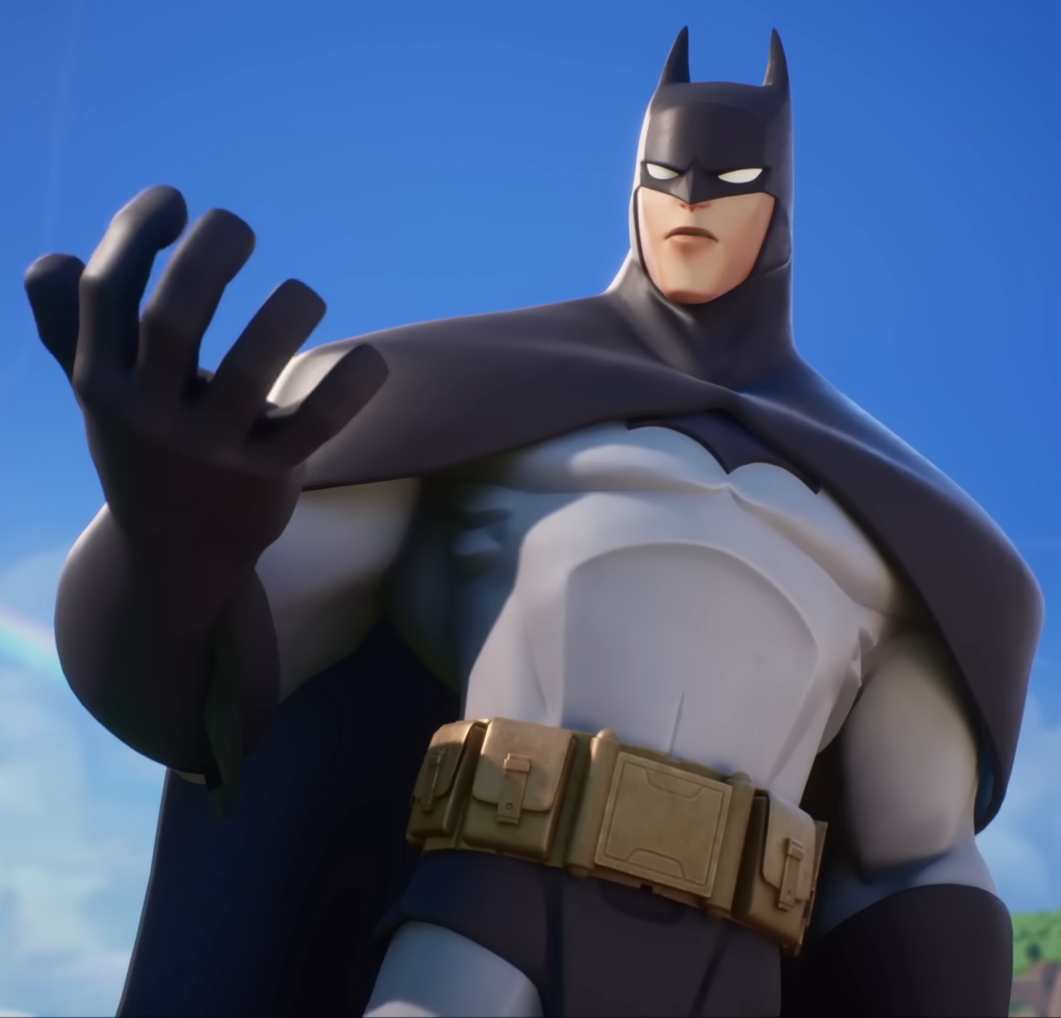
Batman in the trailer of MultiVersus

- Justice League: Cosmic Chaos (2023) for PlayStation 4, PlayStation 5, Xbox One, Xbox Series X, PC and Nintendo Switch: A video game based on the superhero team of the same name, with Diedrich Bader reprising his role from various DC media.
- Suicide Squad: Kill the Justice League (2023) for PlayStation 5, Xbox Series X and PC: A video game based on the anti-hero team of the same name. Batman is posthumously voiced by Kevin Conroy.
- Batman appears as a playable character in MultiVersus, with Kevin Conroy reprising his role from various DC media.

=== LittleBigPlanet ===
Batman appears in LittleBigPlanet 2 (2011) and LittleBigPlanet PS Vita (2012), voiced by Gary Martin.

=== Other video games ===
- The Revenge of Shinobi features a non-authorized Batman as a boss.
- The 8-bit Nintendo Entertainment System game Final Fantasy features "Badman", a character with strong resemblances to Batman, as one of the enemies of the final area.
- The 2017 game Fortnite has Batman-themed cosmetics such as Catwoman and Batman outfits and a Gotham City location in the map. This was added in honor of the 80th anniversary of Batman.
- Batman appears as a playable character in SINoALICE, voiced by Koichi Yamadera.

== Live performances ==
=== Batman Live! ===
In 1966, Adam West and Frank Gorshin went on a tour as Batman and the Riddler to promote the new Batman movie and the series. They were usually accompanied by several bands before the featured event that saw Batman and the Riddler exchange corny jokes as well as a song performed by West. The tour most famously stopped at Shea Stadium in New York on June 25, 1966 and City Park in New Orleans on November 26, 1966.

=== Musical theatre ===
While a parody of a Batman musical was featured in one of the most recent series' comics, in 2002, Jim Steinman, David Ives, and Tim Burton had worked on a theatre production called Batman: The Musical although it was ultimately cancelled. Steinman has revealed five songs from the musical. The first is the opening theme for "Gotham City" and the entry of Batman with his tortured solo "The Graveyard Shift"; followed by "The Joker's Song (Where Does He Get All Those Wonderful Toys?)", "The Catwoman's Song (I Need All The Love I Can Get)", "We're Still The Children We Once Were" (the climactic sequence) and "In The Land Of The Pig The Butcher Is King", sung by the corrupt blood-suckers ruling Gotham, covered on the Meat Loaf album Bat Out of Hell III: The Monster Is Loose. These songs can be heard at the Batman: The Musical memorial site, Dark Knight of the Soul.

A Batman musical is also parodied in the animated series Batman Beyond. The episode "Out of the Past" (first aired October 21, 2000) opens with Bruce Wayne and Terry McGinnis attending a performance of (a fictional) Batman: The Musical, featuring caricatures of prominent members of the Rogues Gallery (the Joker, the Penguin, Two-Face, Catwoman, Poison Ivy, and Harley Quinn). Series creator Paul Dini, who wrote the episode in question, also wrote a song for the fictitious musical entitled Superstitious and Cowardly Lot.

An episode of the sketch comedy show MADtv also featured a Batman: The Musical parody called Batman V: Out of the Cave which starred Tommy Tune as Batman, and Ben Vereen as Robin.

A live stage show was also created, called Batman Live: World Tour. The show is a unique fusion of live-action theatre, magic, stunts, digital projection and music from an 85-piece orchestra and choir. The tour began at Manchester, England, in Summer 2011 and visited arenas throughout the UK and Europe before arriving in North America in Summer 2012. Another stage play by the name of Batman Ninja the Show opened in Japan in November 2021, it adapts the Batman ninja film.

In 2012, the Internet theatre troupe StarKid Productions created a musical titled Holy Musical B@man!, which went on YouTube on April 13. It was performed in Chicago from March 16–25, and because of copyright laws, tickets were free. Batman is portrayed by Joseph (Joe) Walker.

== Music ==
The album Knightfall by multinational Swedish band Silent Images, is based on the Batman: Knightfall story arc, with Batman serving as a central character, the "Nightly Priest". The album explores the underlying sociopolitical themes in the Batman universe, and his struggle against "The Venomous One", which is the album's interpretation of Bane.

== Fine arts ==
Starting with the Pop art period, and on a continuing basis, since the 1960s, the character of Batman has been "appropriated" by multiple visual artists and incorporated into contemporary artwork, most notably by Andy Warhol, Roy Lichtenstein, Mel Ramos, Dulce Pinzon, Mr. Brainwash, Raymond Pettibon, Peter Saul, and others.

== Games, action figures, and other toys ==
Hundreds of Batman action figures, die-cast models, and other items have been released. Many companies have acquired the rights to make Batman merchandise, including:

- Ideal—Captain Action
- Mego—Action figures and dolls
- Corgi—Die-cast metal vehicles
- Remco—Playsets and roleplaying toys
- Toy Biz—Action figures
- Ertl—Die-cast figures & vehicles and model kits
- Applause—PVC figures and dolls
- Hasbro—Action figures
- Monogram—Bobble heads
- Mattel—Action figures and jigsaw puzzles
- Lego—Building bricks and minifigures
- Bandai Japan—S.H. Figuarts

Batman has appeared as a HeroClix figure, along with other Batman characters, in the following HeroClix sets:

- Hypertime
- Cosmic Justice
- Unleashed
- Legacy
- Icons

For April 2006, Lego introduced a Batman line which also includes characters such as the Joker and Two-Face, at American International Toy Fair.

In 2015, Looney Labs in partnership with Cryptozoic Entertainment released a Batman-themed version of its card game Fluxx with art by Derek Ring based on The New Batman Adventures.

== Postage stamps ==
In 2006, the United States Postal Service (USPS) issued a DC Comics Superheroes pane of 20 stamps which included a stamp of Batman.

To celebrate the 75th anniversary of Batman, USPS released a limited edition stamp series on October 9, 2014. Four versions of the superhero were depicted from the four eras of comic book history: Golden, Silver, Bronze and Modern. In addition, it included four versions of the Bat-Signal.

== Theme park attractions ==
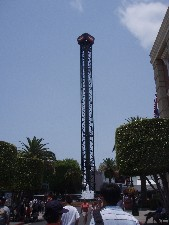
The 61 metres (200 ft)-tall Batwing Spaceshot tower in the Gold Coast, Australia

Several Six Flags theme parks, formerly owned by Warner Bros., opened live-action "Batman Stunt Shows" as the movies increased in popularity. The now closed Six Flags Astroworld in Houston, Texas was home to a standing roller coaster known as Batman: The Escape. Six Flags Over Texas in Arlington, Texas is home to two roller coasters called Mr. Freeze, and Batman: The Ride. Six Flags México in Mexico City, Mexico has also a looping, suspended roller coaster named Batman: The Ride (Six Flags St. Louis has the same ride, as does Six Flags Great America in Gurnee, Illinois) as well as twin roller coasters named Batman and Robin: The Chiller. On the latter attraction, riders may ride on either the Batman or Robin versions of the coaster. But unfortunately in the 2007 off-season, the ride was removed after a long history of technical difficulties and occasionally breaking down. Six Flags Over Georgia contains a Gotham City area that contains the same Batman: The Ride and also features a looping coaster called The Mindbender that was adapted to fit the color tone of the Riddler after Batman Forever came out to fit the Gotham City section of the park it shares with Batman: The Ride. Six Flags Magic Mountain in Valencia, California has two Batman-themed coasters, the suspended coaster Batman: The Ride, and The Riddler's Revenge, a stand-up type roller coaster. This Six Flags park also features an entire themed area called "Gotham City" complete with architecture to match that of the fictional Gotham City. Warner Bros. Movie World in the Gold Coast, Australia, also has two Batman-themed rides. Batman Adventure – The Ride, revamped in 2001, is a motion simulator style simulator ride while Batwing Spaceshot is a vertical free-fall ride.

In 2008, The Dark Knight Coaster opened in Six Flags Great Adventure and Six Flags Great America. Based on The Dark Knight film, they are Wild Mouse roller coasters, indoors, heavily themed, and give riders a feeling that they are being stalked by the Joker. Six Flags New England was originally going to receive this roller coaster; however, due to problems with building permits, the park scratched the project and then sent the coaster to Six Flags México.

== Recurring cast and characters ==
List indicators

This section includes characters who will appear or have appeared in portrayals by actors in Batman media. Characters are listed chronologically by first portrayal.

- An empty grey cell indicates the character was not in the film, or that the character's official presence has not yet been confirmed.
- ^{A} indicates an appearance through archival footage or audio.
- ^{C} indicates a cameo role.
- ^{U} indicates an uncredited appearance.
- ^{V} indicates a voice-only role.
- ^{Y} indicates a younger version of the character.

Character	Live-action film	Radio	Live-action television	Live performance	Records	Animated television	Animated film	Video games	Web series	Podcasts											
Character	Live-action film	Radio	Live-action television	Live performance	Records	Animated television	Animated film	Video games	Web series	Podcasts	Bruce Wayne	Lewis Wilson (1943) Robert Lowery (1949) Adam West (1966, 2023)^{A} Michael Keaton (1989, 1992, 2023) Charles Roskilly (1989)^{Y} Val Kilmer (1995) Ramsey Ellis (1995)^{Y} George Clooney (1997, 2023) Eric Lloyd (1997)^{Y} Christian Bale (2005, 2008, 2012) Gus Lewis (2005, 2012)^{Y}^{A} Ben Affleck (2016, 2017, 2021, 2023) Brandon Spink (2016)^{Y} Dante Pereira-Olson (2019) Robert Pattinson (2022, 2026) Oscar Novak (2022)^{Y}	Scott Douglas (1943)^{V} Stacy Harris (1945)^{V} Matt Crowley^{V} Gary Merrill^{V} Richard Devon (1950)^{V} Bob Sessions (1989–1994)^{V} Shelley Thompson (1989)^{V}^{Y}	Adam West (1966–1968, 1979) Bruce Thomas (2000–2002) David Mazouz (2014–2019) Alain Moussi (2018) Iain Glen (2019–2022) Warren Christie (2019–2022) Mikhail Mudrik (2019) Kevin Conroy (2019)	Adam West (1966) Sam Heughan (2011–2012) Erin Anna Jameson (2011–2012)^{Y}	Adam West (1966, 1976)^{V} Jack Curtis (1966)^{V} Paul Ehlers (1989)^{V} Michael Keaton (1989)^{V}^{A}	Olan Soule (1968, 1969)^{V} Adam West (1977, 1984–1985, 2015)^{V} Kevin Conroy (1992–2018)^{V} Rino Romano (2004–2008)^{V} Zachary Gordon (2008–2011)^{V}^{Y} Mikey Kelley (2008–2011)^{V}^{Y} Dee Bradley Baker (2008–2011)^{V}^{Y} Anthony Ruivivar (2013, 2014)^{V} Troy Baker^{V} Tara Strong (2017)^{V}^{Y} Will Arnett (2019)^{V} Diedrich Bader (2019–2023)^{V}	Kevin Conroy (1993–2019)^{V} Rino Romano (2005, 2007)^{V} Hynden Walch (2008)^{V}^{Y} Rino Romano (2005, 2007)^{V} Bruce Greenwood^{V} Benjamin McKenzie^{V} Peter Weller^{V} Troy Baker^{V} Jason O'Mara^{V} Roger Craig Smith^{V} Will Arnett (2014–2019)^{V} Adam West (2015,^{V} 2017^{A} (Note: Includes posthumous performance)) Keith Ferguson^{V} Jimmy Kimmel^{V}	Kevin Conroy (1994–2024)^{V} Christian Bale (2005)^{V} Gary Martin (2011, 2012)^{V} Troy Baker (2012–2018)^{V} Roger Craig Smith (2013)^{V} Adam West (2014, 2016)^{V} Will Arnett (2015)^{V}^{A} Kōichi Yamadera (2017)^{V} Michael Antonakos (2022)^{V}	Michael Dobson (2008–2009)^{V}	Jeffrey Wright (2021–2022)^{V} Winston Duke (2022)^{V} Tharen Todd Jr.(2022)^{V}^{Y} Justin Hartley (2023)^{V} Colman Domingo (2023)^{V}
Richard John "Dick" Grayson	Douglas Croft (1943) Johnny Duncan (1949) Burt Ward (1966) Chris O'Donnell (1995, 1997) Joseph Gordon-Levitt (2012) (Note: The character retains only part of their real name from the source material.)	Ronald Liss (1945–1949)^{V} Kerry Shale (1989)^{V} James Goode (1994)^{V}	Burt Ward (1966–1968, 1979, 2019) Brenton Thwaites (2018–2022)	Kamran Darabi-Ford (2011–2012) Michael Pickering (2011, 2012)	Burt Ward (1966)^{V} Ronald Liss (1966)^{V}	Casey Kasem (1968–1985)^{V} Burt Ward (1977)^{V} Loren Lester (1992–1999)^{V} Eve Sabara (Note: Originally credited as Evan Sabara; Eve came out as a trans woman in 2020.) (2007–2008)^{V} Crawford Wilson (2008–2011)^{V} Jesse McCartney (2010–2022)^{V} Scott Menville (2003–2006, 2013–2025)^{V} Keith Ferguson (2019–2021)^{V} Harvey Guillén (2021–2022)^{V} AJ Hudson (2022–2023)^{V} Zachary Gordon (2024)^{V}	Loren Lester (1998–2017)^{V} Burt Ward (2015, 2017)^{V} Michael Cera^{V} Scott Menville (2018)^{V} (Note: The character's identity is not given but elements such as their story arc or relationships are consistent.) Sean Maher^{V}	Loren Lester (1994–2016)^{V} Scott Menville (2005)^{V} Christopher Sean (2022)^{V}		Melissa Villaseñor (2021–2022)^{V}											
Alfred Pennyworth	William Austin (1943)^{U} Eric Wilton (1949)^{U} Alan Napier (1966) Michael Gough (1989, 1992, 1995, 1997) Jon Simmons (1997)^{Y} Michael Caine (2005–2012) Jeremy Irons (2016–2021) Douglas Hodge (2019) Andy Serkis (2022, 2026)	Michael Gough (1989, 1994)^{V}	Alan Napier (1966–1968) Ian Abercrombie (1997–2003) Michael Gough (2000–2002) Sean Pertwee (2014–2019) Jack Bannon (2019–2022)	John Conroy (2011–2012)		Clive Revill (1992)^{V} Efrem Zimbalist, Jr. (1992–2004)^{V}	Efrem Zimbalist, Jr. (1993–2003)^{V} Steven Weber^{V} David McCallum^{V} Brian George^{V} Jim Piddock^{V} Jeff Bennett^{V} Robin Atkin Downes^{V} Anthony Head^{V} Michael Jackson^{V} Ralph Fiennes (2017)^{V} David Kaye^{V}	Michael Caine (2005)^{V} Martin Jarvis (2013)^{V} Gildart Jackson (2022)^{V}	Michael Dobson (2008–2009)^{V}	Alan Tudyk (2021–2022)^{V} Jason Isaacs (2022–2023)^{V}											
Vicki Vale	Jane Adams (1949) Kim Basinger (1989)		Brooke Burns (2001)		Kim Basinger (1989)^{V}^{A}	Gabrielle Carteris (2011)^{V}	Tara Strong (2005)^{V} Andrea Romano (2010)^{V} Grey DeLisle (2011)^{V}	Grey DeLisle (2009–2014)^{V} Lorrie Singer (2011)^{V} Anna Vocino (2012)^{V} Jules de Jongh (2016)^{V} Erin Yvette (2016)^{V}		Ashly Burch (2022–2023)^{V}											
James "Jim" Gordon	Lyle Talbot (1949) Neil Hamilton (1966) Pat Hingle (1989, 1992, 1995, 1997) Gary Oldman (2005, 2008, 2012) J. K. Simmons (2017, 2021) Jeffrey Wright (2022)	Paul Maxwell (1989, 1994)^{V}	Neil Hamilton (1966–1968) Ben McKenzie (2014–2019)	Alex Giannini (2011, 2012)		Lennie Weinrib (1977)^{V} Bob Hastings (1992–2003)^{V}	Bob Hastings (1993–2003)^{V} Jim Ward^{V} Jim Meskimen^{V} Ray Wise^{V} Bryan Cranston^{V} Gary Cole^{V}^{U} David Selby^{V} Bruce Thomas^{V} Chris Cox^{V} Richard Epcar^{V} Scott Patterson^{V} Billy Burke^{V} Héctor Elizondo^{V}	Bob Hastings (1994–2003)^{V} Gavin Hammon (2005)^{V} Tom Kane (2009)^{V} Michael Jonathan Gough (2012, 2013)^{V}	Bob Hastings (2000–2002)^{V} John Fitzgerald (2008–2009)^{V}	Kenan Thompson (2021, 2022)^{V}											
Joker	Cesar Romero (1966) Jack Nicholson (1989) Hugo E. Blick (1989)^{Y} David U. Hodges (1995)^{Y} Heath Ledger (2008) Jared Leto (2016, 2021) Joaquin Phoenix (2019, 2024) (Note: The character appears with an entirely different real name to that in the source material.) Barry Keoghan (2022) Connor Storrie (2024)	Kerry Shale (1989)^{V}	Cesar Romero (1966–1968) Roger Stoneburner (2002–2003) Mark Hamill (2002)^{V} Cameron Monaghan (2014–2019) Nathan Dashwood (2019–2022) Nick Creegan (2022)	Mark Frost (2011, 2012)	Caesar Romero (1966)^{V}	Larry Storch (1968–1972)^{V} Lennie Weinrib (1977)^{V} Mark Hamill (1992–2018)^{V}	Mark Hamill (1993–2016)^{V} John DiMaggio^{V} Zach Galifianakis^{V} Jeff Bergman (2016)^{V}	Mark Hamill (1994–2022)^{V} Troy Baker (2013)^{V}	Michael Dobson (2008–2009)^{V}	Brent Spiner (2021, 2022)^{V} Billy Magnussen (2023)^{V}											
Penguin	Burgess Meredith (1966) Danny DeVito (1992) Colin Farrell (2022)		Burgess Meredith (1966–1968) Robin Lord Taylor (2014–2019) Colin Farrell (2024)	Alex Giannini (2011, 2012)	Burgess Meredith (1966)^{V}	Lennie Weinrib (1977)^{V}	David Ogden Stiers^{V} Tom Kenny^{V} Nolan North^{V} Steven Blum^{V} John Venzon^{V}	Nolan North (2012, 2013)^{V} Elias Toufexis (2022)^{V}		Bobby Moynihan (2021, 2022)^{V}											
Riddler	Frank Gorshin (1966) Jim Carrey (1995) Paul Dano (2022)	Stuart Milligan (1994)^{V}	Frank Gorshin (1966, 1968, 1979) John Astin (1967) Cory Michael Smith (2014–2019)	Frank Gorshin (1966) Christopher Price (2011, 2012)	Frank Gorshin (1966)^{V}	Frank Gorshin (1976)^{V} Michael Bell (1978)^{V}	Bruce Timm (2010)^{V} Matthew Gray Gubler^{V} Geoffrey Arend^{V} Rob Paulsen^{V} Conan O'Brien^{V}	Wally Wingert (2013)^{V}		John Leguizamo (2021–2022)^{V} Hasan Minhaj (2022–2023)^{V}											
Catwoman	Lee Meriweather (1966) Michelle Pfeiffer (1992) Halle Berry (2004) Anne Hathaway (2012) Zoe Kravitz (2022)	Lorelei King (1989, 1994)^{V}	Julie Newmar (1966–1967) Eartha Kitt (1967–1968) Casey Elizabeth Easlick (2002–2003) Camren Bicondova (2014–2019) Lili Simmons (2014–2019)	Emma Clifford (2011–2012)	Unknown (1976)^{V}	Melendy Britt (1977)^{V}	Eliza Dushku^{V} Katherine Von Till^{V} Tress MacNeille^{V} Julie Newmar (2016, 2017)^{V} Zoe Kravitz (2017)^{V} Cree Summer^{V}	Grey DeLisle (2012)^{V}	Adrienne Barbeau (2000–2002)^{V}	Rosario Dawson (2021–2022)^{V}											
Mr. Freeze	Arnold Schwarzenegger (1997)		George Sanders (1966) Otto Preminger (1967) Eli Wallach Nathan Darrow (2014–2019)		George Sanders (1966)^{V}	Lennie Weinrib (1977)^{V} Michael Ansara^{V} Jim Meskimen^{V}	Oded Fehr^{V} Eli Wallach^{V} David Burrows^{V}	Maurice LaMarche (2012, 2014)^{V} Donald Chang (2022)^{V}													
Barbara Gordon	Alicia Silverstone (1997) Hannah Gunn (2008)	Shelley Thompson (1989, 1994)^{V}	Yvonne Craig (1967–1972) Dina Meyer (2003, 2019^{V}) Jeté Laurence (2019) Savannah Welch (2021–2022)			Jane Webb (1968)^{V} Melendy Britt (1977)^{V} Melissa Gilbert (1992–1995)^{V} Tara Strong (1997–2023)^{V}	Mary Kay Bergman (1998)^{V} Tara Strong (2000–2016)^{V} Sarah Hyland (2016)^{V} Rosario Dawson (2017)^{V} Alyson Stoner (2018, 2019)^{V} Rachel Bloom (2019)^{V} Peyton R. List (2019)^{V}	Tara Strong (2001–2021)^{V} Kimberly Brooks (2009, 2012)^{V} Kelsey Lansdowne (2013)^{V} Ashley Greene (2014)^{V} America Young (2022)^{V}	Tara Strong (2000–2002)^{V}	Gina Rodriguez (2022–2023)^{V}											
Scarecrow	Cillian Murphy (2005, 2008, 2012)	James Goode (1994)^{V}	David W. Thompson (2018–2019) Rahul Kohli (2019) Vincent Kartheiser (2021)	Benos Noble (2011–2012) Ian Henderson (2011–2012)		Ted Knight (1968)^{V} Don Messick (1978)^{V} Andre Stojka (1985)^{V} Henry Polic II (1992–1995)^{V} Jeffrey Combs (1997–1999)^{V} Charlie Tahan (2014–2018)^{V} Dee Bradley Baker (2008–2011)^{V}	Corey Burton (2008)^{V} Christian Lanz (2014)^{V} Michael Rosenbaum (2015)^{V} Brian T. Delaney (2015)^{V} John DiMaggio (2016)^{V} Jason Mantzoukas (2017)^{V} Jim Meskimen (2019)^{V} Chris Cox (2019)^{V} Dwight Schultz (2020)^{V} Robin Atkin Downes (2021)^{V}	Cillian Murphy (2005)^{V} Robert Englund (2017)^{V}		Bradley Whitford 2022)^{V}											
Ra's al Ghul	Liam Neeson (2005, 2012) Josh Pence (2012)^{Y}	Garrick Hagon (1989)^{V}	Alexander Siddig (2014–2019)			David Warner (1992–2001)^{V}	Jason Isaacs^{V} Giancarlo Esposito^{V}	Liam Neeson (2005)^{V}													
Talia al Ghul	Marion Cotillard (2012) Joey King (2012)^{Y}	Lorelei King (1989)^{V}	Lexa Doig (2017–2020)			Helen Slater (1992–1995)^{V} Olivia Hussey (1996–2001)^{V}	Morena Baccarin^{V} Zehra Fazal^{V}														
Harvey Dent	Billy Dee Williams (1989) Tommy Lee Jones (1995) Aaron Eckhart (2008, 2012)^{A} Harry Lawtey (2024) Sebastian Stan (2027)		Nicholas D'Agosto (2014–2019) Unknown (2018)^{A}^{C} Misha Collins (2023)	Garry Lake (2011–2012) Christopher D. Hunt (2011–2012)		Richard Moll (1992–2010)^{V} Christopher McDonald (2013–2014)^{V}	Billy Dee Williams (2017) Robin Atkin Downes^{V} Wade Williams^{V} Dave Boat^{V} Gary Cole^{V} Josh Duhamel^{V} Troy Baker^{V} William Shatner (2017)^{V} Bruce Timm (2019)^{V} Christian Lanz^{V}	Troy Baker (2012)^{V}	John Fitzgerald (2008–2009)^{V}	Ike Barinholtz (2021–2022)^{V}											
Poison Ivy	Uma Thurman (1997)		Clare Foley (2014–2016) Maggie Geha (2017–2018) Peyton List (2018–2019) Bridget Regan (2021–2022)	Valerie Murzak (2011–2012)		Diane Pershing (1992–2003)^{V} Lake Bell (2019–2023)^{V}	Tara Strong^{V} Riki Lindhome^{V} Vanessa Marshall^{V} Paget Brewster (2017)^{V}	Vanessa Marshall (2008)^{V} Cyndi Williams (2011)^{V} Tasia Valenza (2009–2017)^{V} Laura Bailey (2012)^{V} Tara Strong (2014)^{V}	Diane Pershing (2000–2002)^{V}	Emmy Raver-Lampman (2022)^{V}											
Harley Quinn	Margot Robbie (2016, 2020, 2021) Lady Gaga (2024)		Mia Sara (2003) Cassidy Alexa (Tara Strong^{V}) (2013) Francesca Root-Dodson (2018–2019)	Poppy Tierney (2011, 2012)		Arleen Sorkin (1992–2003)^{V} Tara Strong^{V} Kaley Cuoco (2019–2023)^{V}	Arleen Sorkin (2000)^{V} Tara Strong^{V} Jenny Slate^{V} Melissa Rauch (2017)^{V} Sirena Irwin (2017)^{V}	Arleen Sorkin (2009, 2011)^{V} Tara Strong (2011–2023)^{V} Kari Wahlgren (2022)^{V}	Arleen Sorkin (2000–2002)^{V} Tara Strong (2015)^{V}	Gillian Jacobs (2021–2022)^{V} Christina Ricci (2023)^{V}											
Bane	Robert Swenson (1997) Tom Hardy (2012)	Peter Marinker (1994)^{V}	Shane West (2014–2019)			Henry Silva (1994)^{V} Michael Dorn (1998)^{V} Ron Perlman (2003)^{V} Carlos Alazraqui (2009)^{V} Joaquim de Almeida (2011)^{V} James Adomian (2019)^{V} Danny Trejo (2022)^{V}	Héctor Elizondo (2003)^{V} Steve Blum (2014)^{V} Doug Benson (2017)^{V} Jason Liebrecht (2021)^{V}	Fred Tatasciore (2009)^{V} Steve Blum (2013)^{V} JB Blanc (2016)^{V} Clancy Brown (2018)^{V}													

== See also ==
- Batman (disambiguation)
- Robin in other media
- Barbara Gordon in other media
- Joker in other media
- Riddler in other media
- Scarecrow in other media
- Penguin in other media
- Bane in other media
