= Bane in other media =

Depictions of Bane outside comic books

Adaptations of Bane in other media
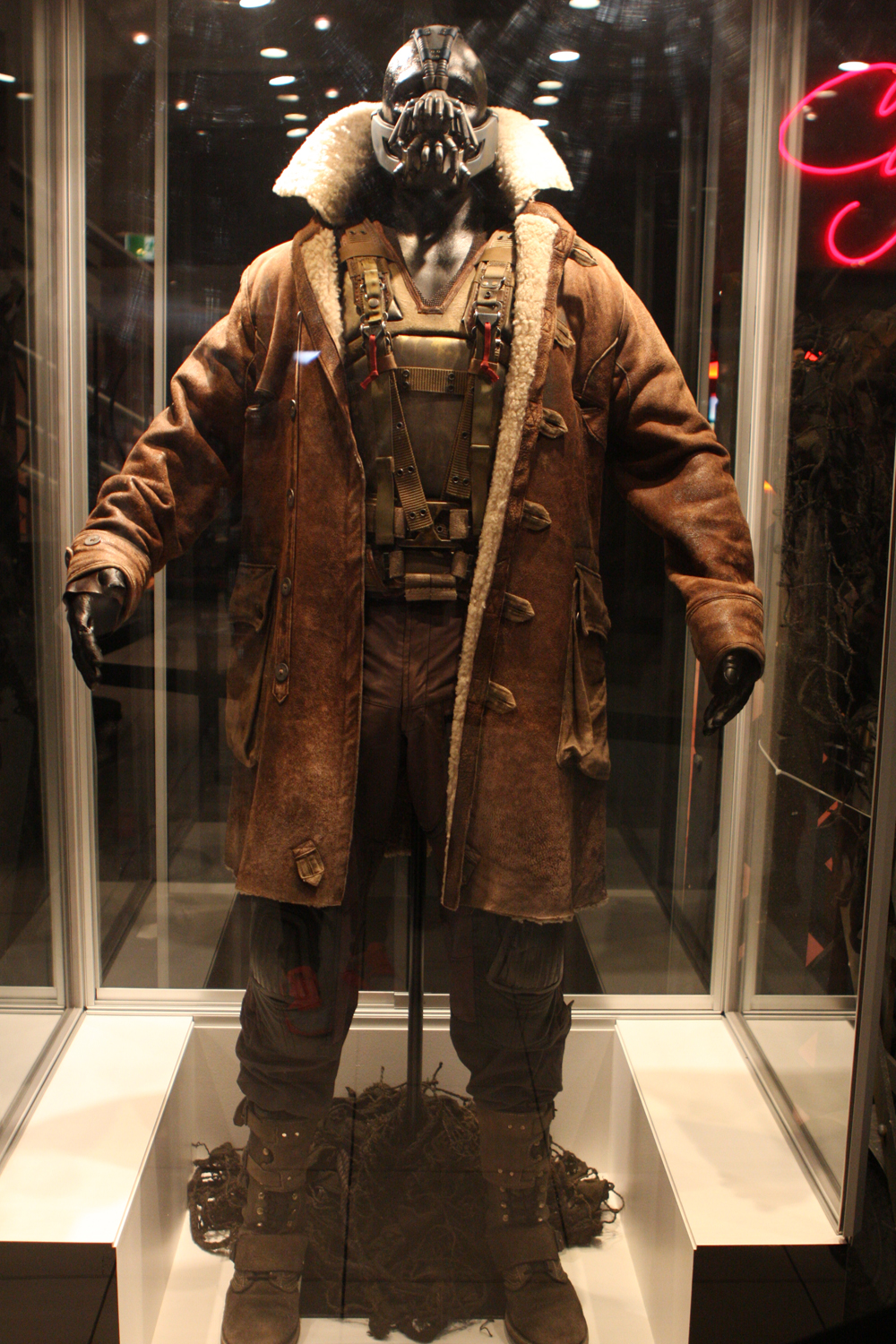
- A mannequin of Bane from The Dark Knight Rises
- Original source: Comics published by DC Comics
- First appearance: Batman: Vengeance of Bane #1 (January 1993)

Films and television
- Film(s): Batman & Robin (1997); The Dark Knight Rises (2012); The Lego Batman Movie (2017); Batman Ninja (2018); Batman: Knightfall (2026)
- Television show(s): Batman: The Animated Series (1994); The New Batman Adventures (1997); Superman: The Animated Series (1998); Batman Beyond (1999); The Batman (2004); Batman: The Brave and the Bold (2008); Young Justice (2010); Justice League Action (2016); Gotham (2019); Harley Quinn (2019)

Bane, a supervillain in DC Comics and an adversary of the superhero Batman, has been adapted in various forms of media, including films, television series, and video games. The character has been portrayed in film by Robert Swenson in Batman & Robin, and Tom Hardy in The Dark Knight Rises, and in television by Shane West in the Fox series Gotham. Henry Silva, Héctor Elizondo, Danny Trejo, Fred Tatasciore, JB Blanc, and others have provided Bane's voice in animation and video games.

== Television ==
Shane West as Bane in Gotham

- Bane appears in The Batman, voiced by Joaquim de Almeida (in "Traction"), Ron Perlman (in "Team Penguin"), and Clancy Brown (in "The Batman/Superman Story"). This version is a South American mercenary whose Venom-enhanced form possesses red skin.
- Bane appears in Batman: The Brave and the Bold, voiced by Michael Dorn.
- Bane appears in Young Justice, voiced by Danny Trejo. This version is an associate of the Light. In his most notable appearances, he clashes with the Kobra cult over the production of his Venom drug, eventually breaks his addiction to it, and allows the Light to conduct business on Santa Prisca.
- Bane makes a non-speaking appearance in the Robot Chicken DC Comics Special as a member of the Legion of Doom.
- Bane appears in the Teen Titans Go! episode "The Great Holiday Escape", voiced by James Adomian.
- Bane appears in the fifth season of Gotham, portrayed by Shane West. This version is Eduardo Dorrance, Jim Gordon's former army friend who became a prisoner of war and incarcerated at Pena Duro. He was eventually freed by Nyssa al Ghul, who enlists him to help her kill Bruce Wayne to avenge her father Ra's al Ghul and destroy Gotham. In the present, Dorrance leads the military group "Delta Force" to seemingly help Gordon and the Gotham City Police Department (GCPD) in their war against Gotham City's criminal element after the city is rendered a "No Man's Land". While confronting Gordon, Dorrance is impaled on a pipe before Nyssa finds him, rehabilitates him, and gives him armor and a respirator with help from Hugo Strange. Rechristening himself as "Bane", Dorrance takes control of the military to battle the GCPD until Gordon and his allies talk the military out of following Dorrance and arrest him and Delta Force instead.
- A robotic duplicate of Bane appears in the Justice League Action episode "System Failure".
- An amalgamated incarnation of Bane appears in Harley Quinn, voiced by James Adomian. This version resembles his comic counterpart, is more dimwitted than most incarnations, obsessed with destroying anyone or anything that antagonizes him for any reason by blowing them up, has an origin story and speaks in a manner similar to The Dark Knight Rises incarnation, and appears as a mistreated member of the Legion of Doom in the first and fourth seasons and founding member of the Injustice League in the second season. In the aforementioned second season, following the Joker destroying Gotham City, Bane helps the League divide the ruins between them, though they mistreat him too. After Harley Quinn and Commissioner Gordon dismantle the League, Bane questions his life choices and attends therapy in the third season.
  - Bane appears in Kite Man: Hell Yeah!, voiced again by Adomian. After being ousted from the Legion, Bane eventually finds work at Noonan's bar as a bouncer.
- Bane appears in the DC Super Hero Girls episode "#AcceptNoSubstitute", voiced again by Eric Lopez. He assumes the alias of Diego Dorrance and becomes an art teacher at Metropolis High School to steal chemicals from its science lab to boost his strength.

=== DC Animated Universe ===
Bane as depicted in Batman: The Animated Series (left) and subsequent appearances (right)

Bane appears in series set in the DC Animated Universe (DCAU), voiced by Henry Silva. Prior to his inclusion, the producers of Batman: The Animated Series were reluctant to use the character as they felt his comic incarnation was too gimmicky.

- Bane first appears in a self-titled episode of Batman: The Animated Series, with Silva sporting a strong Latin American accent. This version is a former inmate of a Cuban prison containing the most dangerous convicts ever captured. While imprisoned, Bane was chosen as a test subject for the government project "Gilgamesh" to create super-soldiers with the drug Venom. Though the experiment was a success, Bane used his newfound superhuman abilities to escape and become a professional assassin.
- A fear toxin-induced dream world incarnation of Bane appears in The New Batman Adventures episode "Over the Edge", with Silva sporting a slightly toned down Latin American accent. For this series, Bane wears an all-black outfit while his traditional luchador mask has been traded for a black gimp mask.
- Bane appears in the Superman: The Animated Series episode "Knight Time".
- Bane makes a non-speaking appearance in the Batman Beyond episode "The Winning Edge". By 2039, Bane's use of Venom has left him frail, comatose, and reliant on an oxygen tank and regular Venom infusions. Taking advantage of this, his physician Jackson Chappell uses his Venom to create and distribute illegal steroid patches called "slappers".

== Film ==
=== Live-action ===
Bane as he appears in Batman & Robin (left) and The Dark Knight Rises (right)
- An original incarnation of Bane named Antonio Diego appears in Batman & Robin (1997), portrayed by Robert Swenson and Michael Reid MacKay respectively. This version is an incarcerated serial killer who was transformed into the unintelligent Bane by Jason Woodrue before serving as an assistant to Poison Ivy and Mr. Freeze. In the movie, Bane was depicted as a roaring, snarling, mindless monster, who rarely speaks and whose only instinct was to crush his enemies. This portrayal of Bane was one of many aspects of the film that received negative criticism from fans and critics alike.
- Bane appears in The Dark Knight Rises, portrayed by Tom Hardy. Intending to portray the character as "more menacing" than the Batman & Robin incarnation, Hardy gained 14 kilograms (31 lb) of muscle for the role, increasing his weight to 90 kilograms (200 lb). Bane's voice was inspired by Bartley Gorman, and initially received criticism during previews for being unintelligible. This version is an ally of the League of Shadows and the self-proclaimed leader of a revolution against the rich and the corrupt. Bane was previously imprisoned in the Pit, a foreign prison where he met Talia al Ghul. While in the Pit, Bane was attacked by its inmates and inflicted with chronic pain that he treats with analgesic gas.

=== Animation ===
- The DCAU incarnation of Bane appears in Batman: Mystery of the Batwoman, voiced by Héctor Elizondo.
- Bane makes a non-speaking cameo appearance in Superman/Batman: Public Enemies.
- Bane appears in Justice League: Doom, voiced by Carlos Alazraqui. This version is a member of the Legion of Doom.
- Bane appears in Lego Batman: The Movie - DC Super Heroes Unite, voiced by Steve Blum.
- The Batman: Arkham incarnation of Bane appears in Batman: Assault on Arkham.
- Bane appears in Batman Unlimited: Mechs vs. Mutants, voiced again by Carlos Alazraqui.
- Bane appears in Lego DC Comics Super Heroes: Justice League – Gotham City Breakout, voiced by Eric Bauza.
- Bane appears in The Lego Batman Movie, voiced by Doug Benson. This version's design is a combination of his comics counterpart and Tom Hardy's portrayal.
- A Feudal Japan-inspired incarnation of Bane appears in Batman Ninja, voiced by Kenta Miyake.
- Bane appears in Batman vs. Teenage Mutant Ninja Turtles, voiced again by Carlos Alazraqui.
- Bane appears in Batman: Hush, voiced by Adam Gifford.
- Bane makes a non-speaking appearance in Justice League Dark: Apokolips War as a member of the Suicide Squad. He and the Squad assist Lois Lane and Superman in assaulting LexCorp for a Boom Tube gate so Superman can reach Apokolips while Lane and the squad defend the gate from Paradooms. Despite being given Kryptonite-infused Venom, Bane is overwhelmed and killed by Paradooms.
- Bane makes a non-speaking cameo appearance in Injustice.
- Bane appears in Merry Little Batman, voiced by Chris Sullivan.
- Bane appears in Batman: Knightfall, voiced by Michael Mando and Noah Mendes as a child.

== Video games ==
=== Lego ===
- Bane appears as a playable character in Lego Batman: The Videogame, voiced by Fred Tatasciore. In addition to his traditional abilities, this version possesses immunity to toxins and serves as a lieutenant to the Penguin, only to be betrayed by him and eventually incarcerated in Arkham Asylum.
- Bane appears as a playable character and boss in Lego Batman 2: DC Super Heroes, voiced by Steve Blum.
- Bane appears as a playable character in Lego Batman 3: Beyond Gotham, voiced by JB Blanc. Additionally, The Dark Knight Rises incarnation of Bane appears as a playable DLC character.
- Bane appears as a playable character and boss in Lego Dimensions, voiced again by Steve Blum.
- Bane appears as a playable character in Lego DC Super-Villains, voiced again by JB Blanc.
- Bane, based on his depiction in The Dark Knight Rises, appears in Lego Batman: Legacy of the Dark Knight, voiced by Matt Berry.

=== Batman: Arkham ===
Bane appears in the Batman: Arkham franchise, voiced primarily by Fred Tatasciore and by JB Blanc in Arkham Origins.

- First appearing as a boss in Batman: Arkham Asylum, this version is used as a test subject by Dr. Penelope Young to create a more powerful version of his Venom formula called "Titan" to help patients survive strenuous procedures. Having been drained of his Venom as a result, Bane is left weakened and emaciated until the Joker remotely infuses him with Venom to fight Batman. His strength restored, Bane nearly kills Batman until the latter summons his Batmobile to ram Bane into the nearby river. In one of three possible post-credits scenes, Bane emerges from the river and clutches onto a floating Titan crate.
- As of Batman: Arkham City, Bane was incarcerated in the eponymous city-prison. In the side mission "Fragile Alliance", Bane meets and enlists Batman's help in finding and destroying twelve Titan canisters that were brought to Arkham City. After Batman destroys half of the canisters, Bane reveals that he collected the other half, intending to use them to empower himself. He then betrays and attacks Batman, who traps him in a defunct elevator and destroys the remaining canisters.
- A young Bane appears as a boss in Batman: Arkham Origins, and a playable character in its multiplayer mode. During this time, he operated as an intelligent yet Venom-addicted mercenary, contract killer, and head of a militia. Additionally, his appearance is a composite of his comic book design and his appearance in The Dark Knight Rises. After being hired by the Joker to kill Batman, Bane deduces the latter's secret identity and takes advantage of Batman's fight with Firefly to attack the Batcave, grievously injuring Alfred Pennyworth in the process. Bane later reluctantly joins forces with the Joker to take over Blackgate Penitentiary and force Batman to kill either one of them. Using the Electrocutioner's shock gloves, Batman stops and restarts Bane's heart. Enraged by this, Bane injects himself with a new strain of Venom called TN-1, turning himself into a hulking monster, only to be defeated by Batman once more. Suffering brain damage that erases his memory of Batman's identity, he is subsequently arrested by the Gotham City Police Department (GCPD).
- A young Bane makes a non-speaking cameo appearance in Batman: Arkham Origins Blackgate. Three months after the events of Arkham Origins, Bane was incarcerated at Blackgate until Amanda Waller hires Catwoman to break him out. After manipulating Batman to help her accomplish her goal, Catwoman attempts to escape with Bane, but Batman stops them, and Bane is taken back into custody.
- Bane appears in Batman: Arkham Shadow via Echo memory bubbles.

=== Other games ===
- Bane appears as a boss in Batman & Robin (1998).
- Bane appears as a boss in Batman: Chaos in Gotham.
- Bane appears in the DCAU game Batman: Rise of Sin Tzu, voiced again by Héctor Elizondo.
- Bane appears as a boss in the DS version of Batman: The Brave and the Bold – The Videogame.
- Bane appears as a boss and unlockable playable character in DC Universe Online, voiced by Jason Liebrecht. This version runs a Venom drug ring in Gotham City from his Cape Carmine Lighthouse hideout and is assisted by various henchmen, some of whom utilize Venom.
- Bane, based on The Dark Knight Rises incarnation, appears in the tie-in mobile game, voiced by Michael Los. This version sports a shaved head and wields a shoulder-holstered handgun.
- Bane appears as a playable character in Injustice: Gods Among Us, voiced again by Fred Tatasciore. Additionally, an alternate reality incarnation who joined High Councilor Superman's Regime appears as well.
- Bane appears as a character summon in Scribblenauts Unmasked: A DC Comics Adventure.
- Bane appears as a boss in Young Justice: Legacy, voiced by Eric Lopez.
- Bane appears as a boss in Batman (2013).
- The Injustice incarnation of Bane appears as a playable character in Injustice 2, voiced again by Fred Tatasciore. Following the Regime's downfall, Bane joined Gorilla Grodd's Society.
- Bane appears in Batman: The Enemy Within, voiced again by JB Blanc. This version is a member of the Pact and close friend of fellow member the Riddler who sports tattoos, facial hair, and initially uses a syringe gun to inject himself with Venom. Additionally, he joined the group in the hopes of using the LOTUS virus to cure his addiction to Venom. If the player's choices lead to the Joker becoming a vigilante, Bane will receive a new strain of Venom and a tube system.
- Bane appears in DC Battle Arena, voiced by Kamran Nikhad.

== Merchandise ==
- The DCAU incarnation of Bane, based on his Batman: The Animated Series design, received a figure in Kenner Products' tie-in toyline.
- The Batman & Robin and Legends of the Dark Knight incarnations of Bane received figures in Kenner's respective tie-in toylines.
- Bane received two figures from DC Direct, with one based on his appearance in Batman: Knightfall and one in the "Secret Files & Origins" series.
- Bane received two figure variants in Mattel's D.C. Superheroes line.
- Bane received a mini-figure in Lego's Bat-Tank building set as part of a two-pack with the Riddler.
- The DCAU incarnation of Bane received several figures in Mattel's Justice League Unlimited toyline as part of a Matty Collector-exclusive four-pack as well as a Build-a-Figure in the DC Universe Classics line.
- The Batman incarnation of Bane received a figure in Mattel's tie-in toyline.
- The Dark Knight Rises incarnation of Bane received several figures from Hot Toys and Mattel as well as vinyl figures by POP Heroes and bobble heads by NECA and Wacky Wobbler.
- The Dark Knight Rises incarnation of Bane received a mini-figure from Lego in 2012.
- The Dark Knight Rises incarnation of Bane received a Play Arts Kai figure from Square Enix.
- Bane received several figures in multiple HeroClix sets, with two being dedicated to The Dark Knight Rises and Batman: Arkham Origins incarnations.
- The Batman: Arkham incarnation of Bane, based on his designs in Arkham Asylum and Arkham Origins, received several figures from DC Collectibles.
- The New Batman Adventures incarnation of Bane received a figure from DC Collectibles.
- The Dark Knight Rises incarnation of Bane received a MAFEX figure in Medicom Toy's The Dark Knight Trilogy line.

== Miscellaneous ==
- Bane appears in the radio adaptation of Batman: Knightfall, voiced by Peter Marinker.
- The Dark Knight Rises incarnation of Bane is parodied in the South Park episode "Insecurity".
- Bane appears in Smallville: Lantern #2. He and the other inmates receive yellow power rings from Parallax and become Yellow Lanterns until Emil Hamilton reboots the rings, de-powering the inmates.
- The Injustice incarnation of Bane appears in Injustice: Gods Among Us: Year Five, in which he aligns himself with Superman's Regime to gain a position of power. Superman is initially suspicious of Bane until the latter helps him and Wonder Woman subdue Doomsday. Despite his allies disagreeing with him, Superman agrees to let Bane join.
- Bane appears in Batman '66 #33. This version is a professional luchador and the dictator of Skull City, Mexico whose Venom is derived from an Aztec artifact called the Crystal Skull. After the Riddler steals the Crystal Skull, Bane allies himself with the former before challenging Batman to a wrestling match. He seemingly breaks the Dark Knight's back, but Batman reveals he hid a Batarang behind his back to prevent this. During their subsequent rematch, Batman defeats Bane and allows him to be apprehended by Skull City's luchadores, freeing the city.
- Bane appears in Silent Images's album Knightfall. This version is a militaristic Übermensch with an uncanny and almost homoerotic connection to Batman.
- Bane appears in DC Heroes United, voiced by Leandro Cano.
- Viktor Gyökeres celebration after he scores a goal, and clasps his hands in front of his face like the mask Bane wears, is inspired by Bane.
