= King Snake =

- King Snake as depicted in Batman #469 (September 1991). Art by Tom Lyle.

Publication information
- Publisher: DC Comics
- First appearance: Robin #2 (February 1991)
- Created by: Chuck Dixon (writer); Tom Lyle (artist)

In-story information
- Alter ego: Sir Edmund Dorrance
- Species: Human
- Team affiliations: Royal Artillery; The Ghost Dragons; Kobra; Black Lantern Corps
- Abilities: Master martial artist Steel-reinforced spine

King Snake (Sir Edmund Dorrance) is a character appearing in media published by DC Comics, usually as an adversary of Robin (Tim Drake) and Batman. Created by writer Chuck Dixon and artist Tom Lyle, King Snake first appeared in Robin #2 (1991). He is a master martial artist and the father of the villain Bane.

== Fictional character biography ==
Edmund Dorrance is a member of the Royal Artillery who works as a mercenary, assisting anti-communism operations. While in Santa Prisca, Dorrance is attacked and blinded by gunfire. He flees the country, leaving behind a fellow rebel with whom he had had a one-night stand and subsequently impregnated. The woman and her son are imprisoned for Edmund's crimes, with the child growing up in prison to become Bane.

After escaping from Santa Prisca, Dorrance moves to Hong Kong and establishes himself as a drug dealer known as King Snake, masquerading as a legitimate businessman. Lady Shiva pursues King Snake, wishing to face him in battle due to his martial arts prowess. Shiva and Robin attack King Snake, who breaks his back after falling off a building.

King Snake later recovers and has his spine reinforced with steel. He joins the terrorist cult Kobra and attempts to become its leader, known as Lord Naja-Naja. King Snake has his eyes healed using a Lazarus Pit, but is blinded again by Robin. After learning that King Snake is his father, Bane tracks him down and battles him. Bane attempts to kill King Snake several times, but refrains from doing so. In the resulting struggle despite the arrival of Batman and Robin, King Snake falls down a deep crevice towards his death.

During the 2009 storyline "Blackest Night", King Snake was resurrected as a member of the Black Lantern Corps. King Snake returned following "The New 52" and "DC Rebirth" relaunches, which rebooted the continuity of the DC universe.

== Powers and abilities ==
King Snake has no superhuman powers. However, he is a master of several of the world's most deadly martial arts. After being blinded during an operation in Santa Prisca, he hones his other senses to compensate. In addition, he also has a steel-reinforced spine.

== In other media ==
- King Snake appears in Batman: Soul of the Dragon, voiced by Patrick Seitz.
- King Snake appears as a character summon in Scribblenauts Unmasked: A DC Comics Adventure.

== See also ==
- List of Batman family enemies
