= Scarecrow in other media =

DC character Scarecrow in other media

Adaptations of Scarecrow in other media
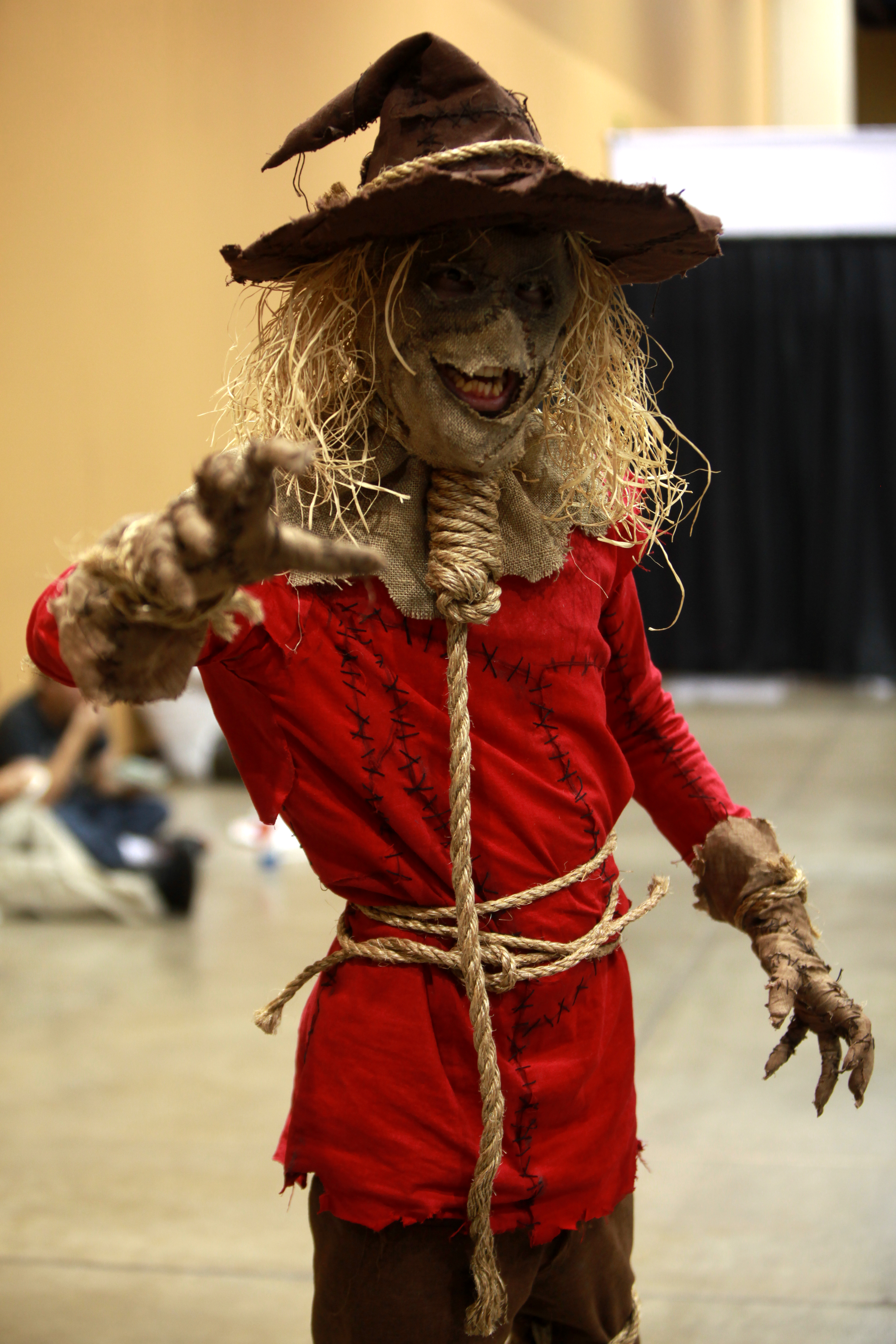
- A cosplayer dressed as Scarecrow
- Original source: Comics published by DC Comics
- First appearance: World's Finest Comics #3 (September 1941)

Films and television
- Film(s): Batman Begins; The Dark Knight; The Dark Knight Rises; The Lego Batman Movie
- Television show(s): The Batman/Superman Hour; Challenge of the Superfriends; Super Powers Team: Galactic Guardians; Batman: The Animated Series; The New Batman Adventures; Batman: The Brave and the Bold; Gotham; Harley Quinn; Titans

The Scarecrow, a supervillain in DC Comics and an adversary of the superhero Batman, has been adapted in various forms of media, including films, television series, and video games. The character has been portrayed in film by Cillian Murphy in The Dark Knight Trilogy, and in television by Charlie Tahan and David W. Thompson in the Fox series Gotham, and Vincent Kartheiser in the HBO Max streaming series Titans. Henry Polic II, Jeffrey Combs, Dino Andrade, John Noble, Robert Englund, and others have provided the Scarecrow's voice in animation and video games.

== Television ==
=== Live-action ===
David W. Thompson as Scarecrow in Gotham

- Jonathan Crane / Scarecrow appears in Gotham, portrayed by Charlie Tahan in the first season and the first half of the fourth season, and David W. Thompson in all other appearances. This version was injected with a serum designed to eliminate fear by his father, Gerald Crane (portrayed by Julian Sands), which instead amplifies Jonathan's fear of scarecrows and drives him insane. After being institutionalized in Arkham Asylum, Jonathan embraces his fears and recreates his father's toxin to become the Scarecrow, and allies with other criminals to terrorize Gotham City.
- Jonathan Crane appears in the third season of Titans, portrayed by Vincent Kartheiser. This version is a former Arkham Asylum inmate turned profiler and consultant for the Gotham City Police Department. He brainwashes Jason Todd into helping him turn Gotham against the Titans, who ultimately defeat and re-incarcerate him in Arkham.

=== Animation ===
- Scarecrow appears in The Batman/Superman Hour episode "The Great Scarecrow Scare", voiced by Ted Knight.
- Scarecrow appears in Challenge of the Superfriends, voiced by Don Messick. This version is a member of the Legion of Doom.
- Scarecrow appears in The Super Powers Team: Galactic Guardians, voiced by Andre Stojka.
- Scarecrow appears in Batman: The Brave and the Bold, voiced by Dee Bradley Baker.
- Scarecrow appears in Robot Chicken, voiced by Seth Green. This version is a member of the Legion of Doom.
- Scarecrow appears in the first season of Harley Quinn, voiced by Rahul Kohli. This version is a member of the Legion of Doom who is later killed by the Joker for unmasking Batman.
  - A younger Scarecrow makes a non-speaking cameo appearance in the Kite Man: Hell Yeah! episode "Portal Potty, Hell Yeah!".
- Scarecrow appears in Batman: Caped Crusader, voiced by Josh Brener. This version wears a Plague doctor mask, and is Jonathan Crane Jr., the son of Jonathan Crane, who was Harleen Quinzel's psych teacher. With help of his university professor, Charles Burton, Jonathan Crane Jr.'s mind broke when his research was deemed unethical. Refusing to abandon his work, Crane weaponizes the formula and begins murdering victims through hallucinations and psychological terror.

==== DC Animated Universe ====
Scarecrow's designs in the DC Animated Universe

Scarecrow appears in the DC Animated Universe (DCAU).

- Scarecrow appears in Batman: The Animated Series, voiced by Henry Polic II. This version is a former psychology professor at Gotham University who was terminated for using students as test subjects for his fear toxin. He becomes the Scarecrow to seek revenge, which brings him into conflict with Batman.
- Scarecrow appears in The New Batman Adventures, voiced by Jeffrey Combs. He is given a "darker" revamp in both design and personality to make him more "scary". Producers Bruce Timm and Paul Dini described Scarecrow's redesign as a "Texas Chainsaw Massacre Leatherface kind of look. It really had nothing to do with being a scarecrow per se, but he was definitely scary [....] He looked like a hanged man who had been cut down and gone off to terrorize people. We weren't even sure if there was an actual guy in the suit." Scarecrow also develops a new toxin that removes fear and causes dangerous recklessness in its subjects.

== Film ==
=== Live-action ===
Cillian Murphy as Scarecrow in The Dark Knight

- In Batman & Robin, Coolio makes a cameo appearance as a character credited as "Banker", who would have been revealed as Jonathan Crane in the cancelled sequel Batman Unchained.
- Dr. Jonathan Crane / Scarecrow appears in The Dark Knight Trilogy, portrayed by Cillian Murphy. This version wears a burlap sack with a built-in rebreather that doubles as a gas mask for his fear experiments. Murphy explained that the relatively simple mask, as opposed to the full scarecrow costume seen in the comics, was utilized "to avoid the Worzel Gummidge look, because he's not a very physically imposing man—he's more interested in the manipulation of the mind and what that can do".
  - Introduced in Batman Begins as a corrupt psychopharmacologist and Arkham Asylum's Chief Administrator, Crane secretly creates a fear-inducing hallucinogen and plots to use it with Ra's al Ghul to plunge Gotham City into chaos. Crane exposes mafia boss Carmine Falcone, Batman, and assistant district attorney Rachel Dawes to his fear toxin, though Batman later subdues Crane with his own drug. Despite being institutionalized in Arkham, Crane escapes and takes the name "Scarecrow" amidst a mass breakout during Ra's al Ghul’s attack on Gotham.
  - In The Dark Knight, Scarecrow is apprehended by Batman while overseeing a drug deal with the Russian mob.
  - In The Dark Knight Rises, Crane is freed from Blackgate Penitentiary during Bane's takeover of Gotham and presides over proletarian kangaroo courts wherein he offers Gotham's elite a choice between death and exile.

=== Animation ===
- Scarecrow appears in the Batman: Gotham Knight segment "In Darkness Dwells", voiced by Corey Burton.
- The Batman: Arkham incarnation of Scarecrow makes a cameo appearance in Batman: Assault on Arkham, voiced by Christian Lanz.
- Scarecrow appears in the DC Animated Movie Universe (DCAMU) short film Nightwing and Robin, voiced by Michael Rosenbaum.
- Scarecrow appears in Batman Unlimited: Monster Mayhem, voiced by Brian T. Delaney.
- Scarecrow appears in Lego DC Comics Super Heroes: Justice League: Gotham City Breakout, voiced by an uncredited John DiMaggio.
- Scarecrow appears in The Lego Batman Movie, voiced by Jason Mantzoukas.
- Scarecrow makes a non-speaking appearance in Scooby-Doo! & Batman: The Brave and the Bold.
- Scarecrow appears in Batman vs. Teenage Mutant Ninja Turtles, voiced by Jim Meskimen.
- Scarecrow appears in Batman: Hush, voiced by Chris Cox.
- Scarecrow appears in Lego DC Batman: Family Matters, voiced by Steve Blum.
- Scarecrow appears in Happy Halloween, Scooby-Doo!, voiced by Dwight Schultz.
- Scarecrow appears in Batman: The Long Halloween, voiced by Robin Atkin Downes.
- Scarecrow makes a non-speaking cameo appearance in Injustice.
- Scarecrow makes a cameo appearance in Merry Little Batman, voiced by Fred Tatasciore.
- Scarecrow makes a non-speaking appearance in Batman: Knightfall.

== Video games ==
- Scarecrow appears as a boss in Batman: The Animated Series (1993).
- Scarecrow appears as a boss in The Adventures of Batman & Robin.
- Scarecrow appears as a boss in Batman: Rise of Sin Tzu, voiced again by Jeffrey Combs.
- The Dark Knight Trilogy incarnation of Scarecrow appears as a boss in the Batman Begins tie-in game, voiced by Cillian Murphy.
- Scarecrow appears as a boss in the Nintendo DS version of Batman: The Brave and the Bold – The Videogame.
- Scarecrow appears as a boss in DC Universe Online, voiced by Christopher S. Field.
- The Dark Knight Trilogy incarnation of Scarecrow appears as a boss in The Dark Knight Rises tie-in mobile game, voiced by Jason Griffith.
- The Batman: Arkham Asylum incarnation of Scarecrow makes a cameo appearance in Injustice: Gods Among Us in the Arkham Asylum stage.
- Scarecrow appears in Scribblenauts Unmasked: A DC Comics Adventure.
- Scarecrow appears in Batman (2013), voiced by Brian Silva.
- Scarecrow appears as a playable character in Injustice 2, voiced by Robert Englund. This version is a member of Gorilla Grodd's Society.
- Scarecrow appears in Batman: Caped Crusader - Chronicles (2026).

=== Lego series ===
- Scarecrow appears as a boss in Lego Batman: The Videogame, voiced by Dave Wittenberg.
- Scarecrow appears as an unlockable playable character in Lego Batman 2: DC Super Heroes, voiced by Nolan North.
- The Dark Knight Trilogy incarnation of Scarecrow appears as a playable character in Lego Batman 3: Beyond Gotham via downloadable content.
- Scarecrow appears in Lego DC Super-Villains, voiced again by Jeffrey Combs. This version is a member of the Legion of Doom and a fan of Sinestro.
- Scarecrow appears in Lego Batman: Legacy of the Dark Knight, voiced by Matt Yulish, as a small mini boss in Arkham Asylum. His appearance is based of his look in Batman: Arkham Asylum.

=== Batman: Arkham ===
Scarecrow's designs in Batman: Arkham Asylum (left) and Batman: Arkham Knight (right)

Jonathan Crane / Scarecrow appears in the Batman: Arkham series. This version wields a mechanical gauntlet with four hypodermic needles laced with his fear toxin.

- Scarecrow appears in Batman: Arkham Asylum, voiced by Dino Andrade. After being freed during the Joker's takeover of Arkham Island, he exposes Batman to his fear toxin and attempts to infect Gotham City's water supply, only to be attacked and dragged into the sewers by Killer Croc. In a post-credits scene, Scarecrow emerges from the ocean and grabs a floating crate of Titan formula.
- In Batman: Arkham City, Scarecrow leaves hidden radio frequency broadcasts for Batman that, when decrypted, reveal three messages: "I will return Batman", "You will pay for what you have done to me", and "Fear will tear Gotham City to shreds". A boat in Arkham City's harbor also contains a human test subject for his fear toxin.
- Scarecrow appears in Batman: Arkham Knight, voiced by John Noble. He allies with the Arkham Knight, unites all of Gotham's criminals, and forces a citywide evacuation by unleashing his new strain of fear toxin on Halloween. Although Batman defeats the Knight and Poison Ivy sacrifices herself to neutralize the toxin's effects, Scarecrow takes Commissioner James Gordon and Robin hostage to force Batman to surrender at the ruins of Arkham Asylum. Scarecrow unmasks Batman as Bruce Wayne on live television before injecting him with fear toxin, but Batman overcomes his fears and subdues Scarecrow with his own drug, after which he is taken into the Gotham City Police Department's custody.
- Scarecrow appears as a playable character in Batman: Arkham Underworld, voiced again by Dino Andrade.
- A younger Jonathan Crane appears in Batman: Arkham Shadow, voiced by Elijah Wood. While serving as Blackgate Penitentiary's Director of Rehabilitation, he develops and tests "Project Umbra"—a hallucinogen designed to bring out the psyche's repressed "shadow"—on his patients, such as Arnold Wesker and Harvey Dent. Crane fires Dr. Harleen Quinzel when she discovers his crimes, but Batman halts Crane's experiments and exposes him to his own hallucinogen.

== Miscellaneous ==
- The DCAU incarnation of Scarecrow appears in The Batman Adventures. Writer Ty Templeton intended to provide an explanation for the character's revamped design in The New Batman Adventures before the series was cancelled. In his first two featured stories, Scarecrow is shown to be a split personality of Crane's, often speaking through the mask. This version of Scarecrow, while villainous and deranged, is notably more sympathetic, as he tries, unsuccessfully, to rehabilitate himself and return to teaching. As shown in the story "Study Hall" he escapes Arkham, changes his identity, and becomes an English professor. He manages to genuinely befriend one of his students, Molly Randall, but after he discovers Molly's abuse by her boyfriend, Bromley, Crane snaps and once again dons the Scarecrow mask to torture Bromley. Batman stops him before he can kill Bromley, and Scarecrow is returned to Arkham, but not without a small acknowledgement from Batman that Crane was trying to seek justice for Molly, albeit in a twisted manner.
- The Injustice incarnation of Scarecrow appears in the Injustice: Gods Among Us prequel comic.
- Scarecrow appears in Batman '66 #28.
- Scarecrow makes non-speaking appearances in the Batman Unlimited web series.
- Scarecrow appears in the limited comic series Batman '89: Echoes.
- Scarecrow appears in Little Batman: Month One, a tie-in comic to Merry Little Batman.
