= Robert Swenson =

American professional wrestler, stuntman and actor (1957–1997)

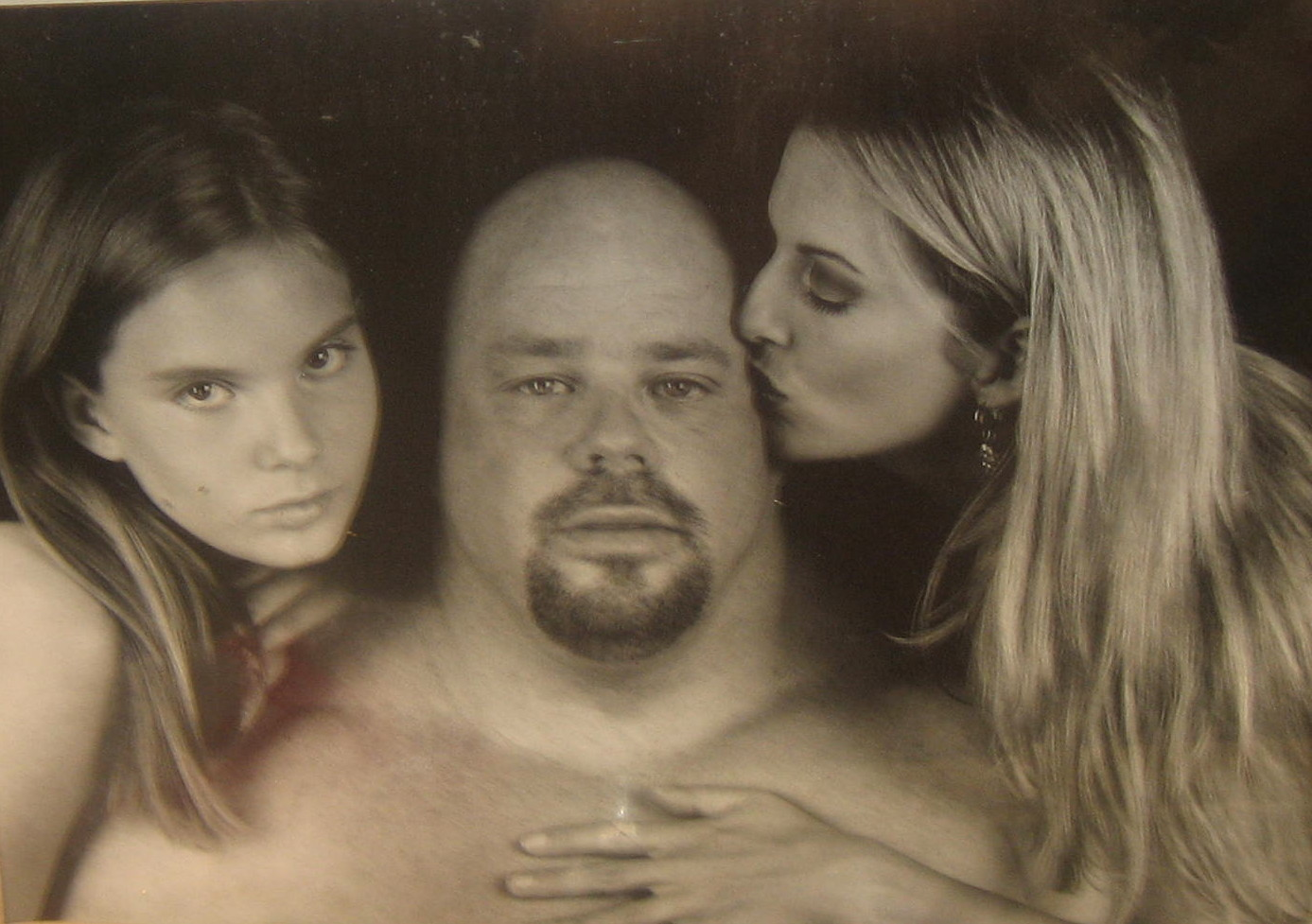
- Swenson with his wife and daughter in 1996

Personal information
- Born: Robert Alexander Swenson Jr. January 5, 1957 San Antonio, Texas, U.S.
- Died: August 18, 1997 (aged 40) Los Angeles, California, U.S.

Professional wrestling career
- Ring name(s): Jeep Swenson; Jeep the Mercenary; The Final Solution; The Ultimate Solution; Bane
- Billed height: 6 ft 4 in (1.93 m)
- Billed weight: 405 lb (184 kg; 28.9 st)
- Billed from: San Antonio, Texas and Durban, South Africa
- Debut: 1987
- Retired: 1996

Robert Alexander "Jeep" Swenson Jr. (January 5, 1957 – August 18, 1997) was an American professional wrestler, stuntman and actor.

== Career ==
=== Wrestling ===
Swenson wrestled for World Class Championship Wrestling in 1987 and 1988 as Jeep Swenson for manager Gary Hart. He debuted on March 7, 1987, defeating Perry Jackson in a 2-minute challenge match. His main feud was with Bruiser Brody, who was wrestling as the masked "Red River Jack". Brody defeated him at the Parade of Champions 1987 event. According to Swenson, he had the largest biceps in the world at that time (they were recorded in the Guinness Book of World Records). From 1993 to 1994, he wrestled for Global Wrestling Federation in Texas, where he feuded with Ahmed Johnson.

Swenson returned to wrestling for a match at World Championship Wrestling's Uncensored pay-per-view on March 24, 1996. He performed as a member of the "Alliance to End Hulkamania". He was named The Final Solution, but following complaints from Jewish organizations to the Turner corporate offices, his character was renamed The Ultimate Solution. WCW claimed they were unaware that The Final Solution was the name Adolf Hitler gave to his plan to destroy the Jews. The Alliance consisted of the Dungeon of Doom, the Four Horsemen, The Ultimate Solution and Z-Gangsta, working to end Hulk Hogan's career.

=== Boxing ===
Swenson boxed as an amateur middleweight and later had a brief career as a professional boxer. He won his first two bouts by knockouts, but his third fight was stopped in round one after Frankie Garcia knocked him down twice in his pro debut.

=== Acting ===
Swenson (middle, with full Bane makeup) with his parents in 1997

Swenson's first role was as an uncredited thug in an early Jackie Chan movie The Big Brawl. Swenson also appeared as pit fighter "Lugwrench" Perkins in the 1989 Hulk Hogan film No Holds Barred. He played the masked version of Dorian in the 1994 film The Mask. He also played James Caan's bodyguard Bledsoe in the Damon Wayans and Adam Sandler film Bulletproof, before playing possibly his best known character Bane in the critically panned 1997 film Batman & Robin. His actual blood vessels were outlined in ink for “Batman” by the makeup experts at Warner Bros. He was also featured in many magazines and television commercials.

== Personal life ==
Swenson was born in San Antonio, Texas as the son and only child of Patricia Maxine (née Wells) (1920-2006) and Robert Alexander Swenson Sr (1920-1997). His nickname, "Jeep", was derived from his dad (a World War II soldier known as "Tank"), whose logic was that every tank needed a Jeep.

== Death ==
On August 18, 1997, Swenson died of heart failure at the UCLA Medical Center at the age of 40. Hulk Hogan, Davey Boy Smith, and James Caan gave eulogies at his funeral. His death was likely contributed to by his usage of steroids which he started to use in his early 20s during his pro wrestling career. Because of this, he reportedly could not shower properly, put on a shirt, or easily walk upstairs. His death also shocked George Clooney, Arnold Schwarzenegger, and Uma Thurman, his co-stars in the Batman & Robin film. After the funeral, Swenson was cremated, and his ashes were scattered in an undisclosed location.

== Filmography ==
=== Film ===
Year	Title	Role	Notes
1980	The Big Brawl	Thug	Uncredited
1989	No Holds Barred	Lugwrench Perkins	
1994	The Mask	masked Dorian	Uncredited
1996	Bulletproof	Bledsoe	
1997	Batman & Robin	Bane	
1997	The Bad Pack	Missouri Mule	(posthumous release)
2005	Beyond Batman: Frozen Freaks and Femme Fatales - The Makeup of 'Batman & Robin'	Himself (archive footage)	Documentary

=== Television ===
Year	Title	Role	Notes
1993–1995	Walker, Texas Ranger	Jumbo Stark / Sammy	2 Episodes

== See also ==
- List of premature professional wrestling deaths
