= Donald C. Chang =

Hong Kong professor

- 張東才
- Born: 1942 (age 83–84); Guangdong, China
- Education: National Taiwan University (BS); Rice University (MS, PhD)
- Occupation: Physicist
- Known for: Spin-echo NMR, electroporation
- Scientific career
- Fields: Quantum physics Biophysics
- Workplaces: Rice University; Baylor College of Medicine; Marine Biological Lab at Woods Hole; Hong Kong University of Science & Technology
- Doctoral advisor: Harold E. Rorschach Jr.

Donald Choy Chang (traditional Chinese: 張東才; simplified Chinese: 张东才; born 1942) is a founding professor of the Hong Kong University of Science and Technology (HKUST). He was also the founding President of the Biophysical Society of Hong Kong. He is currently Professor Emeritus and adjunct professor in HKUST. Chang has wide research interests. He works in the fields of nuclear magnetic resonance, biophysics and quantum physics. He was elected a fellow of the American Physical Society in 2023.

== Early life and education ==
Chang was born in what is now Shenzhen in Guangdong, China, in 1942. His father was a rice merchant, and Chang's family fled to Hong Kong to escape the Land Reform Movement. While attending a refugee school in Hong Kong, Chang became interested in science. He received multiple scholarships to attend National Taiwan University, where he received a B.S. in physics in 1965, then earned a M.S. and Ph.D. in the subject at Rice University in the United States.

== Detection of cancer using nuclear magnetic resonance (NMR) ==
Chang is an early pioneer in the study of the physical properties of water in cells using spin-echo nuclear magnetic resonance (NMR) techniques. When Donald Chang was working in the Physics Department at Rice University, he built a home-made NMR spectrometer to measure the relaxation times (T1 and T2) of water in normal cells/tissues, cancer cells and simply in free water samples.

His major collaborator at that time was the physiologist, C.F. Hazlewood, in the Baylor College of Medicine. Many publications related to this work were published with Hazlewood. Chang and his team gave the first time report that the relaxation time of cellular water (heart muscle cells in this case) is much shorter than the relaxation time of free water in 1971. Also, their experiments suggested that such shortening of relaxation times in cellular water is not due to the diffusion limitation as was believed at that time.

In 1972, they used the same technique to test the relaxation times for normal cells and cancer cells. They found that for breast tissue cells evolving from normal cells to pre-tumor cell (pre-neoplastic) and finally to tumor cells, their water relaxation times gradually increased. This finding means it is possible to use NMR to detect pre-cancer cells and cancer cells. In 1973, Paul Lauterbur published a paper in Nature (1973) suggesting that one can use a magnetic field gradient to differentiate water molecules in different location of a sample. This idea triggered the development of the MRI (magnetic resonance imaging) technique. And it is widely used today in detecting cancer/tumors. Later, Lauterbur was awarded the Nobel Prize in 2003 for this work.

== Development of electroporation and electrofusion ==
In the early 1980s, researchers found that cell membranes can be transiently permeabilized using strong electrical pulses. During this "opening up", many macro-molecules, including DNA, RNA and some proteins can enter the cells. After some time, the cell membrane will seal again. This is called "electroporation".

Chang invented a technique using a pulsed radio frequency electric field to achieve the electroporation, which is much more efficient in gene transfection and cell fusion. (The "electrofusion" uses roughly the same technique as electroporation, the difference is that the electrofusion involves the fusion of two cells).

At 1980s, the concept of membrane "pore" was still a theory, but not visualized; the physical properties of the electroporation was not well understood. For example: What does the pore look like? What is the size of pores on the membrane? How long is the "opening up" time window? Chang and his collaborator T. S. Reese used a technique called "rapid freezing-fracture electron microscopy" to take the snapshots of this process. For the first time, he showed the structure of the pores induced by the external electric field. This study provides the first structural evidence for the existence of the previously hypothesized "electropores" and was reported in the cover story of the July 1990 issue of the Biophysical Journal.

== Works on biophotonics probes ==
Green fluorescent protein (GFP) and Fluorescent Resonance Energy Transfer (FRET) are two important optical probes/sensors discovered and developed in late 20th century. GFP was first isolated by Shimomura in 1962 in the Woods Hole Marine Biological Lab. After the GPF gene was cloned, it became a very handy tool for visualization of molecules in the cells. Chang collaborated with Roger Tsien's team and fused the GFP gene with calmodulin (CaM) gene, and injected this GFP-labelled CaM DNA into cells. After this fusion gene was expressed, the dynamic changes of the CaM-GFP protein can be recorded.

== Works on fundamental physics ==
Since the last decade, many of Chang's work are focusing on some fundamental questions in physics. One of his works examined the physical meaning of the Planck constant based on the Maxwell theory. The Planck constant h is one of the most important universal constants. But the physical nature of h is not well understood. The Planck's relation was originally derived based on phenomenological considerations rather than from first principles. Chang's paper showed that by modeling the photon as a wave packet of electromagnetic radiation, the energy and momentum can be calculated directly based on the Maxwell's theory. Using the assumption that the emission and transmission of a photon follows the principle of all-or-none, he found that the energy of the wave packet is proportional to its oscillation frequency. Follow this work, the Planck constant is derived explicitly. It suggests that the Planck constant is closely related to the physical properties of the vacuum.

Another major work of Chang is a proposed experimental testing of whether there is a resting frame in the universe by measuring the particle masses. There is an unsolved conflict between the postulate of relativity and the quantum theories used in cosmology and particle physics today: The former assumes the universe does not have a resting frame, but the latter implies a resting frame exists. The famous Michelson–Morley experiment tested that for light, all inertial frames are equivalent, i.e., there seems to be no resting frame for light propagation. However, it has never been tested whether the massive charged particles follow the same law. Chang's proposal is to precisely measure the particles' mass of two electrons moving in opposite directions. If a difference in mass of the two electrons is detected, it means not all inertial frames are the same for massive particles; if no difference is detected, it means all inertial frames are also the same for massive particles.

In recent years, Chang was actively involved in studying the foundation of quantum physics. His work was recently published by Springer/Nature as a monograph entitled "On the Wave Nature of Matter: A New Approach to Reconciling Quantum Mechanics and Relativity".

This book introduces a new theory for explaining the origin of matter and the physical basis of quantum mechanics. This hypothesis is called the "quantum wave model," which suggests that matter is made of waves. More specifically, it is proposed that the vacuum is a dielectric medium according to Maxwell's theory, and quantum particles are quantized excitation waves of the vacuum. It can be shown that the existing quantum wave equations, including the Klein-Gordon equation, the Dirac equation, and the Schrödinger equation, can be derived directly based on the mechanism of vacuum excitation. This model not only provides a physical basis for explaining the phenomenon of wave-particle duality, it can also explain why particles can be created in the vacuum and why energy can be converted into matter.

== Selected publications ==
- Structure and function in excitable cells. Chang, Donald C., Tasaki, Adelman, W.J., Jr., and Leuchtag, H.R. (Eds). New York: Plenum Press. 1983. ISBN 0306413388. OCLC 9830807.
- Chang D.C. (1989) Cell Fusion and Cell Poration by Pulsed Radio-Frequency Electric Fields. In: Neumann E., Sowers A.E., Jordan C.A. (eds) Electroporation and Electrofusion in Cell Biology. Springer, Boston, MA
- Guide to electroporation and electrofusion. Chang, Donald C., Sowers, A.E., Chassy, B. and Saunders, J.A. (Eds). San Diego: Academic Press. 1992. ISBN 1299193528. OCLC 817706277.
- Chang D.C. (1997) Experimental Strategies in Efficient Transfection of Mammalian Cells. In: Tuan R.S. (eds) Recombinant Gene Expression Protocols. Methods in Molecular Biology, vol 62. Humana Press, ISBN 978-1-59259-548-8
- Chang D.C. (1998) "Chapter 88: Electroporation and Electrofusion", Spector, D. L., Goldman, R. D., Leinwand, L. A. (eds) Cells: A Laboratory Manual. Cold Spring Harbor Laboratory Press. ISBN 9780879695224, pp. 88.1-88.11.
- Chang, Donald C. (2006-09-15), "Electroporation and Electrofusion", Meyers, Robert A., ed., Encyclopedia of Molecular Cell Biology and Molecular Medicine, Wiley, ISBN 9783527600908
- Chang D.C., Zhou L., Luo K.Q. (2005) Using GFP and FRET Technologies for Studying Signaling Mechanisms of Apoptosis in a Single Living Cell. In: Shen X., Van Wijk R. (eds) Biophotonics-Optical Science & Engineering for 21st Century. Springer, Boston, MA,ISBN 9780387249964
- On the Wave Nature of Matter: A New Approach to Reconciling Quantum Mechanics and Relativity. Donald C. Chang, Springer, 2024. ISBN 978-3-031-48776-7
