= Bane (DC Comics) =

DC Comics supervillain

- Bane, as he appeared during the Knightfall arc in Detective Comics #666 (July 1993), art by co-creator Graham Nolan (pencils), Scott Hanna (inks), and Adrienne Roy (colors)

Publication information
- Publisher: DC Comics
- First appearance: Batman: Vengeance of Bane #1 (January 1993)
- Created by: Chuck Dixon (writer); Doug Moench; Graham Nolan (artist)

In-story information
- Species: Metahuman
- Team affiliations: Suicide Squad; Secret Society of Super Villains; Secret Six; League of Assassins; Legion of Doom
- Abilities: Genius-level intellect; Master strategist and tactician; Skilled hand-to-hand combatant and marksman; Venom steroid grants: Superhuman strength, speed, stamina, agility, durability, and reflexes; Accelerated healing

Bane is a supervillain appearing in American comic books published by DC Comics. Created by Chuck Dixon, Doug Moench, and Graham Nolan, the character first appeared in Batman: Vengeance of Bane #1 (January 1993). He is regarded as one of Batman's most enduring enemies, part of the collective of adversaries that make up Batman's rogues gallery. In his comic book appearances, Bane is an international criminal with a combination of brute strength and exceptional intelligence.

Born in captivity in the Peña Duro prison on the Caribbean island of Santa Prisca, where he served a life sentence for his father King Snake's revolutionary activities, Bane becomes a test subject for the super-steroid known as "Venom." After escaping from the prison, Bane travels to Gotham City, where he defeats Batman and breaks the superhero's back. This event is commonly referred to as the "Breaking of the Bat," and Bane is often regarded as one of the few villains to have significantly challenged Batman both physically and mentally.

The character has been adapted in various media incarnations, portrayed in film by Robert Swenson in the 1997 film Batman & Robin, and by Tom Hardy in the 2012 film The Dark Knight Rises. In television, Bane was portrayed by Shane West in the Fox series Gotham. Henry Silva, Héctor Elizondo, Danny Trejo, Fred Tatasciore, JB Blanc, and others have provided Bane's voice in animation and video games. IGN's list of the Top 100 Comic Book Villains of All Time ranked Bane as #34.

== Publication history ==
Chuck Dixon and Graham Nolan created the character for the Knightfall storyline. They developed the concept of Bane after an initial idea by Batman editor Dennis O'Neil.

O'Neil had previously created Bane's birthplace of Santa Prisca in The Question and the drug Venom in the storyline of the same name (published in the pages of Batman: Legends of the Dark Knight #16–20, and later reprinted as a trade paperback). In the pages of Azrael, O'Neil introduced Bane's perception of Venom as both an addiction and the weakness responsible for his earlier defeats.

=== Creation ===
Co-creator Graham Nolan spoke on the character's creation, stating, "Chuck came up with the idea of an evil Doc Savage… So when I had to design the character I started with Doc Savage… I figured, if he had a costume, what would he be exposed to, living where he was living? So I gravitated towards a Mexican Luchador, and that's how that look came up."

== Fictional character biography ==
=== Origin story ===
Bane's origin story is established in the storyline "Guttenberg". His father, Edmund Dorrance (also known as King Snake), was a revolutionary who escaped the court system of Santa Prisca, an island nation in the Caribbean. Following Dorrance's presumed death, the government decreed that his young son would serve out his life sentence, leading Bane to spend his childhood and early adult life in Santa Prisca's prison.

Despite his imprisonment, Bane's natural abilities allowed him to develop extraordinary skills within the prison's walls. He extensively read books, engaged in rigorous bodybuilding training in the prison's gym, developed his own form of meditation, and became highly proficient in combat through the harsh realities of prison life. Due to Santa Prisca's cultural and geographical influences, Bane became fluent in multiple languages, including English, Spanish, Portuguese, Farsi, Urdu and Latin. During his incarceration, he was mentored by various individuals, from hardened convicts to an elderly Jesuit priest, under whom he received a classical education. Years later, Bane murdered this priest upon his return to Santa Prisca. He committed his first murder at the age of eight, stabbing a criminal attempting to use him to gain information about the prison. The warden was so horrified by this act that he denounced the child as "a bane to everything holy", inadvertently giving him the name he would one day answer to. Throughout his time in prison, Bane carried a teddy bear he named Osito ("little bear" in Spanish), which he considered his only friend. Osito concealed a knife that Bane used for protection.

Since childhood, Bane had been gripped by a fear of bats, hunted in his nightmares by the Bat-Demon of Peña Duro—a monstrous entity akin to the ancient deity Camazotz. Over time, he gained dominance within Peña Duro and became known as Bane. The prison's controllers took note of his strength. Eventually, they forced him to become a test subject for a mysterious experimental drug called Venom, which had killed all other subjects. The Peña Duro prison Venom experiment nearly killed Bane, but he survived and discovered that the drug significantly increased his physical strength. However, he became addicted, requiring doses every 12 hours through a system of tubes attached directly to his brain to avoid debilitating withdrawal effects.

Bane eventually escaped Peña Duro with his minions Trogg, Zombie, and Bird. These characters are named after 1960s rock bands—The Troggs, The Zombies, and The Byrds—and are inspired by three of Doc Savage's assistants Monk, Ham, and Renny. Fascinated by Gotham City, Bane is determined to confront Batman after hearing stories about him from Bird. He sees Gotham City as ruled by fear, similar to Peña Duro, but it is the fear of Batman. Convinced that Batman embodies the creature that has haunted his nightmares, Bane believes their confrontations are inevitable.

=== Batman: Knightfall ===
Bane breaks Batman's back in a splash page from Batman #497 (July 1993). Art by Jim Aparo. This particular image was recreated in other Batman media.

During the Knightfall storyline, Bane devises a plan to weaken Batman both physically and mentally. He uses stolen munitions to destroy the walls of Arkham Asylum, allowing a prison break. Batman exhausts himself recapturing the villains and returning them to Arkham. During this time, Bane remains in the shadows working at his plan for Batman. He also captures and interrogates Robin, who had been spying on him, but fails to extract any useful information. Additionally, Bane has a rematch with Killer Croc that ends in a stalemate, with both being swept away into Gotham's sewers. Both physically and mentally exhausted, Batman returns to Wayne Manor, unaware Bane has been waiting for him. Bane ambushes and overpowers Batman, then breaks his back, leaving Batman paraplegic. This moment, often referred to as "Breaking the Bat", has been depicted in various adaptions, including The Dark Knight Rises, and Robot Chicken's DC Comics Special. It was alluded to numerous times in the DC Animated Universe (DCAU).

Following Batman's incapacitation, Bane takes control of Gotham's criminal underworld. Bruce Wayne passed the mantle of Batman to Jean-Paul Valley, also known as Azrael. Despite warnings to avoid Bane, Azrael attempts to confront the villain in his penthouse suite. By this point, Azrael has modified the Batsuit and added a set of high-tech, heavy metal gauntlets capable of launching sharp projectiles. During their battle, Bane uses Venom to enhance his strength and goads Azrael causing him to fight recklessly, allowing Bane the opportunity to beat him. Nevertheless, Bane sustains deep lacerations and experiences significant blood loss.

Unable to go to a hospital, Bane increases his Venom intake to manage his injuries while preparing for another confrontation with Batman. A humiliated Azrael returns to the Batcave and constructs an advanced combat suit of metal and equipped with offensive weaponry. In their final battle, Bane, weakened and on the defensive, is overpowered when Azrael severs the tubes supplying him with Venom, immediately causing severe withdrawal symptoms. Watching the fight, Commissioner James "Jim" Gordon, Harvey Bullock, and Robin witness Azrael brutally defeating Bane, who pleads for death. However, Azrael refrains from killing him and leaves him to be taken into police custody, humiliated and physically and mentally broken.

Following the events of Knightfall, Bane recovers from his Venom addiction while serving time in Blackgate Prison. He rebuilds his body to its peak and eventually escapes from prison. Returning to Gotham, Bane allies with Batman, who has since recovered and reclaimed his role from Azrael, to dismantle a criminal operation distributing a modified version of Venom to street-level thugs. During their efforts, Bane discovers that the operation is connected to the same doctor who performed surgery on him in Peña Duro. After the criminals are defeated, Bane declares that he is "innocent" of his past actions and urges Batman to cease pursuing him. He then departs Gotham to begin a personal quest to find his unknown father.

=== Bane's Search for Identity ===
Bane's search brings him back to Santa Prisca. Seeking answers, he consults the Jesuit priest who educated him during his time in Peña Duro. The priest informs him that there are four possible candidates for his father: a Santa Priscan revolutionary, an American doctor, an English mercenary, and a Swiss banker. While searching for the Swiss man in Rome, Bane encounters Talia al Ghul and the League of Assassins. Over time, he earns the approval of Ra's al Ghul, who selects Bane to marry Talia and become his heir. However, despite discovering the true identity of Bane's father, Ra's withholds this information.

During the Legacy storyline, Ra's al Ghul then launches a plague attack on Gotham, with Bane accompanying him under the alias Ubu. As part of the conflict, Bane gets his rematch with Batman in Detective Comics #701 where Batman defeats him in single combat. Disappointed by his protegé's failure, Ra's recalls the engagement to Talia and fires Bane.

As part of his continued search for his origins, Bane learns from the Jesuit priest that there is a possibility that his biological father is an American doctor in the Tabula Rasa storyline. Investigating this lead, Bane comes to the conclusion that he and Batman share a father —Thomas Wayne—who had spent time in Santa Prisca and was acquainted with Bane's mother. Bane informs Batman of this possibility and remains at Wayne Manor while awaiting DNA test results. During this time, he fights alongside Batman on the streets of Gotham. The test ultimately confirmed that Thomas Wayne is not Bane's father. Following this revelation, Bane leaves Gotham peacefully – and with Batman's blessing and financial backing – to pursue leads in the snowy mountains of Kangchenjunga.

Bane eventually uncovers the truth in the Veritas Liberat storyline, where he discovers his father is the mercenary King Snake. During this arc, Bane joins Batman and helps prevent King Snake from deploying powerful weapons. During this confrontation, Bane saves Batman from being shot by King Snake, but is mortally wounded in the process. Batman then saves Bane by immersing Bane in a Lazarus Pit, which heals him. Following his recovery, Bane is left to determine his future without the burden of his past actions.

=== Independent Schemes and Gotham's Upheaval ===
Following the events of Legacy, Bane appears in the one-shot publication Batman: Bane (1997) with the intent of destroying Gotham City using a nuclear reactor. However, Batman intervenes and successfully prevents the plot. In the Angel and the Bane storyline, Bane ambushes Azrael, defeats him in combat, and captures him. He then forcibly exposes Azrael to an even more potent strain of Venom. Azrael ultimately escapes into the jungle with Nomoz and successfully, through his enhanced stamina and strong will, overcomes his addiction. Despite being weakened and injured, Azrael manages to outmaneuver Bane psychologically and defeats him before taking him back to Gotham, which has been severely damaged by the Cataclysm storyline. During an aftershock, Bane briefly escapes but is quickly recaptured by Azrael.

Bane resurfaces in the story arc No Man's Land, where he works as an enforcer for Lex Luthor. Luthor, under the guise of assisting Gotham's reconstruction, attempts to take control of Gotham. However, Batman convinces Bane to leave after a brief confrontation between Bane and the Joker. Following the fallout with Ra's al Ghul, Bane embarks on a campaign to destroy all Lazarus Pits worldwide. During this process, he encounters Black Canary.

=== Post Crisis and Global Conflicts ===
Bane resurfaces in the "One Year Later" continuity of JSA Classified #17–18 searching for the Hourmen, Rex and Rick Tyler, asking for their help. He recounts how, prior to the events of Infinite Crisis, he had returned to Santa Prisca to overthrow the ruling drug lords. In doing so, he discovered the existence of a new, more addictive strain of Venom. His attempt to eradicate the drug trade led to his capture, and he was forcibly re-implanted with Venom-delivery tubes, making him dependent on the new formula and unable to quit without fatal withdrawal symptoms. Bane was subsequently coerced into serving as an enforcer for the cartel.

Believing that Bane genuinely sought Rex Tyler's expertise in chemistry, Rick allows him to approach his father. However, it is revealed that Bane's story is a ruse; he had already eliminated the drug lords and destroyed all research on the new strain of Venom. During his investigation, he discovered that both strains of Venom originated from Rex Tyler's early research on Miraclo. After discovering from the Tylers that no records of Rex's research exist, Bane captures Rex and steals Rick's equipment, intending to force Rick to take the last of the new Venom and live as an addict. Rick manipulates Bane into using Miraclo, causing the destruction of the building. As Rick and his father escape, Bane is left buried in the rubble of the same Santa Priscan penitentiary where his story began.

Bane resurfaces in Santa Prisca, where he attempts to establish democratic elections. Upon discovering that the elections had been manipulated by Computron under the orders from Checkmate, he enforces martial law, plunging the country into a civil war. Fire and Thomas Jagger are sent on the mission to Santa Prisca. Jagger, contemplating vengeance for his father's death, engages Bane in combat. He defeats Bane but ultimately decides not to kill him.

At the end of the miniseries Suicide Squad: Raise the Flag, Amanda Waller recruits Bane into the Suicide Squad. In Outsiders #50, he is depicted once again using a tubing system to supply him with Venom. In Salvation Run #2, Bane is betrayed by his fellow squad members and exiled to the prison planet. In Salvation Run #3, Bane allies with Lex Luthor's faction after the Joker's faction rebels against Luthor's leadership.

In Superman/Batman #53-#56, Bane is shown trafficking Venom to drug lords worldwide. During one of these shipments, Batman—who was temporarily imbued with Superman's powers— responded by attacking Bane at his home. Easily overpowering him, Batman nearly kills Bane due to his vastly superior strength. However, Bane ultimately survives his injuries, aided by the enhanced stamina provided by his Venom supply.

=== Bane's Role in Secret Six and Later Conflicts ===
Beginning in September 2008, Bane appears as a regular character in the ongoing Secret Six series. In the first issue, Bane is depicted as a stoic devil's advocate for the group, offering alternative points of view for both Deadshot and Catman on the subject of love. He is later shown to have an almost fatherlike concern for Scandal Savage's well-being. Although this is largely played for laughs in the early issues, the first arc's final issue displays the depth of Bane's affection. When the Six are attacked by an army of supervillains, Bane's concern for Scandal results in temporarily breaking his vow to never take Venom again in order to save her, despite being on the brink of death.

After recovering from his injuries, Bane reappears in Gotham City with Catman and Rag Doll in an attempt to manage some of the chaos caused by the presumed death of Batman. Over the course of the team's several escapades, Bane reveals both deep respects for Batman, his former adversary, and a painful yearning to assume the mantle of Batman himself. In one instance, Bane tells a trio of rescued citizens to tell people that it was the Batman who saved them. Bane ultimately gives his blessing to Dick Grayson, praying that "God help him."

Following a near-disastrous mission, Bane assumes leadership over the Six. His first act as leader is to remove Scandal from active duty, not wishing for her to be endangered. Bane and Scandal later engage in a one on one fight where he refuses to fight back until Scandal uses her Lamentation Blades to slash his throat. The card is ultimately used to resurrect Knockout.

As his mental state deteriorates, Bane leads the Secret Six to Gotham in an attempt to psychologically break Batman by killing several of his closest allies. The team kidnaps the Penguin to extract information about Batman's partners. In the final issue of the series, Bane ultimately decides on Red Robin, Azrael, and Batgirl as his intended victims. Before the Six can carry out their plan, the Penguin betrays their location, resulting in a massive army of superheroes ranging from Green Lantern, Batman and the Superman family to the Justice League, the Birds of Prey, and Booster Gold converging on Gotham. The Secret Six stage a desperate last stand, but are quickly defeated. With the fates of the other Secret Six members left ambiguous, Bane is last shown being driven away in a Gotham police van. The ending of the issue implies that he plans to escape.

=== The New 52: War for Gotham ===
In September 2011, The New 52 rebooted DC's continuity, reintroducing Bane is into DC Universe through Paul Jenkins and David Finch's run on Batman: The Dark Knight (vol. 2). In this version, Bruce Wayne investigates a breakout at Arkham Asylum. There, he discovers criminals are being given a modified fear toxin mixed with Venom, which enhances the criminals strength and immune to fear. Bane is revealed to be behind the new toxin, which is distributed to the criminals by a new villain named White Rabbit. Batman approaches her, but she quickly defeats him and injects him with the fear toxin, which she then gives to the Flash. Batman manages to burn the fear toxin out of his and the Flash's bodies and ultimately defeats Bane and knocks him off an edge. Bane is then washed away by the tide.

Bane later appears in Detective Comics vol. 2 #19, in the story "War Council". His appearance is altered to include a vest and cargo pants, and now commands an army. a flashback reveals that prior to his appearance in Batman: The Dark Knight, Bane had intended to steal a nuclear device to threaten Gotham City, only to have an encounter with the Court of Owls, who prevented him from stealing the device to prevent him from interfering with their plans. After Batman defeats Bane, a mysterious figure informs him that the Court of Owls had undermined his plans. Bane returns to Santa Prisca to lead his army against them.

During the Forever Evil storyline, Scarecrow learns that Bane may be responsible for the Blackgate Prison uprising and will be their leader in the impending war. Bane, having escaped Peña Dura Prison in Santa Prisca, ships his Venom to Gotham City as preparation for when he arrives. He orchestrates the release of Blackgate's prisoners during the Crime Syndicate's broadcast to the world. Later, on board his ship, he prepares his men for the impending war with Scarecrow, and with Gotham in the distant, claims it will be his. Bane enters Blackgate through the sewers to join the prisoners there. While there, he comes across where the Talons are stored hoping to make them into his weapons. While the attack on Gotham City begins between Bane's men and the GCPD, Bane also approaches Professor Pyg, forcing him to join his cause, and spread word that everything in Gotham is now controlled by Bane. Bane arrives at Blackgate as Man-Bat and his fellow bats are attempting to transport the Talons to Mr. Freeze and is able to keep one from leaving. Bane retrieves Emperor Penguin for the Penguin as part of their agreement.

When Bane brings Emperor Penguin to the Penguin, the Penguin tells him that the Arkham fighters are not scared of Bane, as he does not instill fear as Batman did. Realizing this, Bane constructs a Batsuit for himself and heads to Wayne Tower to confront Killer Croc. Bane fights Killer Croc and is able to defeat him, setting his sights on retrieving the Talons. Bane awakens the Talon William Cobb and takes him through Gotham where he fights various inmates of Arkham Asylum. Bane begins recruiting Gotham citizens to his side, offering his base at Wayne Tower as a haven to the people to escape the rule of the Arkham inmates. He tells Cobb his plan to turn the city over to the Court, in exchange for use of Talons at his disposal to be powered by his Venom. The Talons attack Bane's men, and eventually set their target on Bane. With Cobb's help, Bane injures them enough to activate their regenerative powers and free them from mind control.

In Batman: Eternal, Alfred Pennyworth is attacked by Hush and infected with a fear toxin, he is transferred to Arkham Asylum, which is soon attacked as part of the conspiracy. Alfred survives the explosion of the asylum and tricks Bane into helping him reach an emergency cave Batman had installed beneath Arkham. Bane is knocked out by the cave's defenses, allowing Alfred to call for help.

=== DC Rebirth and modern appearances ===
In the DC Rebirth continuity, Bane still lives in Santa Prisca. In Batman vol. 3 #6, it is revealed that he had been trading Venom to Professor Hugo Strange in exchange for the services of Psycho-Pirate, who was helping him overcome his addiction to the substance. Strange uses the Venom to revive the corpses of several of his patients, as seen in the Night of the Monster Men crossover.

In Batman vol. 3 #10, Batman, per the suggestion of Amanda Waller, undertakes a suicide mission to Santa Prisca aided by Catwoman, Bronze Tiger, Ventriloquist, and the clown couple Punch and Jewelee to take Psycho-Pirate from Bane. Batman needs Psycho-Pirate to undo the damage he caused to Gotham Girl, and each member of the team will receive some sort of reward for their efforts. Bane captures Batman shortly after he arrives, and then breaks his back again and throws him into the cell where he spent his childhood. Batman escapes, however, and fixes his back on his own. After allowing Catwoman to "betray" him and having the Bronze Tiger and Punch and Jewelee fake their deaths, Batman uses the Ventriloquist to incapacitate Psycho-Pirate and tells Catwoman to break Bane's back. This act of humiliation and the loss of Psycho-Pirate causes Bane to snap and scream for Venom from the prison guards.

In Batman vol. 3 #16, Bane has recruited his old henchmen Bird, Trogg, and Zombie in his quest to break Batman once and for all before recapturing Psycho-Pirate from Arkham Asylum. Bane hangs Dick Grayson, Jason Todd, and Damian Wayne in the Batcave before setting off for the asylum, but the three survive. Bane's henchmen then capture Catwoman, Duke Thomas, Commissioner Gordon, and Bronze Tiger to cut Batman off from his allies. Bane beats Batman savagely in an alley and believes him dead, but finds out that Catwoman has escaped, freed the rest of the hostages, and tied up Bane's henchmen, giving Batman a chance to flee.

Enraged, Bane storms Arkham Asylum where Alfred is forcing Psycho-Pirate to undo the fear he inflicted upon Gotham Girl. Batman decides to release many of the inmates to fight Bane and thus buy Alfred and Psycho-Pirate more time, but Bane easily beats the inmates before making the Riddler open a door to Batman for him. Bane and Batman then have another fight, with a bloodied Batman barely beating his nemesis.

In Infinite Frontier, a partial clone of Bane was introduced named "Vengeance", hunting Joker for information of her father. In The Joker (vol. 2) #8, it is revealed that Vengeance is an artificial clone created using Bane's DNA.

==== Bane: Conquest ====
In the 12-issue miniseries Bane: Conquest, it is revealed that Bane survived his fight with Batman, as he focuses on his criminal exploits outside of Gotham City. Bane and his trio Bird, Zombie, and Trogg, investigate a group of mercenaries who are transporting nuclear weapons to Gotham. Bane is captured alongside Bruce Wayne, but the pair escape together. Bane defeats the mercenaries and their leader, Dionysus, who is little more than a head and two pairs of limbs.

Bane and his trio decide to appropriate Dionysus' vast criminal empire. They then attempt to destroy criminal rival organizations Vor and Kobra. Bane kidnaps the infant heir to Kobra, but Batman intervenes and appeals to his humanity, leading Bane to abandon the child for adoption.

== Powers and abilities ==
Bane is highly intelligent; with his intellect being recognized in the Bane of the Demon storyline, where Ra's al Ghul says that Bane "has a mind equal to the greatest he has known" (though he dismisses Bane's abilities as more like the cunning of an animal rather than the cultured, trained intellect of Batman). Bane's physical strength is sufficient for him to lift 15 tonnes (33,000 lb; 15,000 kg).

While imprisoned, Bane taught himself various scientific disciplines, reaching an understanding equal with leading experts in those fields. He is fluent in ten active languages, including Spanish, English, French, German, Russian, Mandarin Chinese, Persian, Dari, Urdu, and Latin, as well as at least four arcane or dead languages. The Bane of the Demon storyline reveals that he has an eidetic memory. Within one year, he is able to deduce Batman's secret identity.

Bane is also known for his strategic and tactical expertise. In prison, Bane also invented his own form of calisthenics, meditation, and combat techniques. In early stories written by Chuck Dixon, Bane is depicted as a calm, centered warrior drawing strength from meditation and the spiritual energy of the Peña Duro prison. Dixon imbued Bane with almost supernatural qualities, claiming that Bane triumphed in prison fights through these abilities, whereas his opponents were driven by rage and greed. This calmness allowed Bane to view time and space differently, multiple scenes of Vengeance of Bane explore this aspect when it explains that Bane's mastery of meditation techniques "made time and space playthings to him."

Bane's use of the Venom drug enhances his physical abilities to superhuman levels, including strength and accelerated healing. In most versions of the character, Bane requires a specialized tank to control the amount of Venom injected into his body. Though Bane had sworn off using Venom in Vengeance of Bane II (1995), this continuity has sometimes been depicted differently, with some adaptations showing Bane still wearing the Venom equipment. Writer Gail Simone addressed this inconsistency in Secret Six, explaining that Bane kept the device out of habit despite his vow never to use it again. On one occasion, he uses venom to save his comrade and daughter-figure, Scandal Savage.

== Other versions ==
=== Amalgam Comics ===
Two composite characters based on Bane and one Marvel Comics character appear in Amalgam Comics: Hydra agent Bane Simpson, an amalgamation of Bane and Nuke; and the "Banisher", an amalgamation of Bane and the Punisher who is described as a "gun-toting, drugged up anti-hero who broke Bruce Wayne's back".

=== Absolute Batman ===
An alternate universe version of Bane appears in Absolute Batman. This version is the son of a revolutionary who fought for freedom in Santa Prisca. Following an encounter with the Joker, who offered his help in their goal in exchange for joining him and killing his father, Bane agreed and went on to become his lead enforcer. Bane would also undergo experimentation at the Joker's black site, Ark M and equipped with Venom, which allows him to enhance his strength and intelligence by granting him full control of every cell in his body. In the present, Bane overpowers Batman, imprisons him in Ark M, and exposes him to Venom in an attempt to break him and rebuild him to take his place so he can leave the Joker's service. However, Batman breaks out and uses his Venom to overdose Bane and destroy his body. A team from Ark M subsequently collects his brain, eyes, and spine and places him in a tube to heal before the Joker forces Bane to watch him drop a nuclear bomb on Santa Prisca.

=== Elseworlds ===
Bane appears in numerous Elseworlds stories, such as Batman: Nosferatu, which he appears as a low-level criminal, and JLA: Riddle of the Beast, in which his corpse makes a cameo appearance.

=== Batman/Teenage Mutant Ninja Turtles ===
Bane appears in Batman/Teenage Mutant Ninja Turtles, in which he is mutated into an anthropomorphic African elephant by the Shredder before he is eventually defeated by Batman and the Teenage Mutant Ninja Turtles, reverted to normal, and taken into A.R.G.U.S. custody. In the sequel miniseries, Bane is chosen by a faction of the League of Assassins to serve as their new leader under the belief that only he has the strength to succeed where Ra's al Ghul has failed. However, he ends up in the Turtles' universe after Donatello's transporter malfunctions amidst his attempt to return to Batman's universe. Bane subsequently takes over the Foot Clan and New York after developing an enhanced version of Venom with help from Baxter Stockman until he is defeated by the Bat-Family, the Turtles, and Shredder.

=== Batman: White Knight ===
Bane appears in Batman: White Knight, in which he, among other villains, is brainwashed by Jack Napier via particles from Clayface's body and the Mad Hatter's technology. In the sequel, Batman: Curse of the White Knight, Bane is among several villains murdered by Azrael.

== See also ==
- List of Batman family enemies
