= Knightfall (Silent Images album) =

Studio album by Silent Images
- Released: 28 March 2016
- Studios: Studio Motion, Berno Studio, Hoborec Studios, Flatpig Studio
- Genres: Death Metal, thrash metal, progressive metal
- Length: 55:17
- Label: Art Gates Records
- Producers: Ulf Blomberg, Silent Images

Silent Images chronology
Silent Images (2014)	Knightfall (2016)

Knightfall is the first full-length album by multinational Swedish band, Silent Images. The album is based on the Batman: Knightfall story arc, with additional cues taken from the Batman: Arkham game series, as well as trinkets of philosophy. The album has been heralded as a didactic dissection of the intimate dichotomy between the Dark Knight and Bane as well as an analysis of sociopolitical issues through the narrative medium. Lyrically, Shakespearean English, German, French and Latin are utilized to complement the diverse musicality. The band´s hybridization of various subgenres has led to their music being branded as "Contemporary Extreme Metal". Metal.de gave the album a rating of five out of ten.

== Track listing ==
All lyrics are written by Mithun MK; all music is composed by David Sosa Larzabal.

Prologue
No.	Title	Length
1.	"Cry Havoc"	1:01

Act I
No.	Title	Length
2.	"Unleash the Dogs of War"	4:39
3.	"Praefectus Nostrum"	7:15
4.	"Realpolitik"	4:50

Act II
No.	Title	Length
5.	"I Am the City (Je suis la nuit)"	5:14
6.	"Tick-Tock"	6:30
7.	"Außenpolitik"	5:08

Act III
No.	Title	Length
8.	"Brethren's Burden"	4:06
9.	"Rise, Narcissus, Rise!"	5:05
10.	"Ignotum"	3:53

Epilogue
No.	Title	Length
11.	"Of Fervid Custodians"	07:36
Total length:		55:17

== Personnel ==
- David Sosa Larzabal – guitars
- Manolo Beltran – drums
- Renzo Jaldin – bass
- Mithun MK - vocals
