= Silent Images =

- Origin: Sweden, Argentina, Bolivia, Singapore
- Genres: Death metal, thrash metal, progressive metal
- Years active: 2011–present
- Label: Art Gates Records
- Members: David Sosa Larzabal; Manolo Beltran; Renzo Jaldin; Mithun MK
- Website: Silent Images Official

Silent Images is a Malmö-based, Swedish progressive death metal/thrash metal band, and is notable for being the sole extreme metal act from Sweden that solely encompasses musicians of foreign backgrounds, namely Argentina, Bolivia and Singapore. The members’ distinctively broad experiences in Rock, Metal, Jazz and Latin have proved invaluable in adding a unique taste to the band’s sound.

== History ==
The band was founded in 2011 by Argentinean-born David Sosa on guitars and Bolivian-born Manolo Beltran on drums. In 2012, Bolivian Renzo Jaldin & Singaporean Mithun MK (Deus Ex Machina) were respectively roped in on bass and vocals to complete the equation.

The band released a self-titled EP in 2013, and thereafter played multiple shows regionally och nationally. In 2015, Silent Images recorded Knightfall, their full-length sophomore album at Hoborec Studios, Malmö. The album is based on the Batman:Knightfall story arc, with additional cues taken from the Batman: Arkham game series, as well as trinkets of philosophy. Lyrically, Shakespearean English, German, French and Latin were utilized to complement the diverse musicality.

Following the recording of Knightfall, they joined the growing roster of Spanish label Art Gates Records, whom scheduled their album for an international release in March 2016.

== Musical style ==
Silent Images depicts a musical style that is highly varied, and an amalgamation of different influences. Their music has been referred to as a Pandora´s box of brutality, melody and eclecticism. Critics have positively categorized the band as death metal, melodic death metal, progressive metal, and thrash metal, whilst simultaneously considering to be original in their ventures. Vocally, the approach used is very diversified and unorthodox, with comparisons having been made to other theatrical acts such as Cradle Of Filth, Rammstein, Dir En Grey and King Diamond. Lyrically, the band´s conceptualizations utilize highly poetic and sophisticated content, with multiple languages complementing Shakespearean overtones.

The band has cited numerous influences, primarily Megadeth, Symphony X, Meshuggah, Dying Fetus, Dream Theater, Pantera as among their many inspirations.

== Band members ==
- David Sosa Larzabal – guitars (2011–Present)
- Manolo Beltran – drums (2011–Present)
- Renzo Jaldin – bass (2012–Present)
- Mithun MK - vocals (2012–Present)

== Discography ==
- Silent Images (EP, 2014)
- Knightfall (Album, 2016)
