= List of video games based on comics =

The following is a list of video games based on comics. The list does not include games based on Japanese manga, which are separately listed at List of video games based on anime or manga.

== 0-9 ==
- 100 Bullets (cancelled; PlayStation 2, Xbox)
- XIII (2003; Xbox, PlayStation 2, GameCube, Microsoft Windows, OS X)
- 300: March to Glory (2007; PlayStation Portable)

== A ==
- Alien vs. Predator:
  - Alien vs. Predator (cancelled; Lynx)
  - Alien (1982; Atari 2600, ZX81, DOS)
  - Alien (1984; Commodore 64, ZX Spectrum, Amstrad CPC)
  - Aliens: The Computer Game (1986; Amstrad CPC, Apple II, Commodore 64, ZX Spectrum)
  - Aliens: Alien 2 (1987; MSX)
  - Predator (1987; Acorn Electron, Amiga, Amstrad CPC, Atari ST, BBC Micro, Commodore 64, ZX Spectrum)
  - Aliens (1990; arcade)
  - Predator 2 (1990; Amiga, Amstrad CPC, Atari ST, Commodore 64, DOS, ZX Spectrum)
  - Predator 2 (1991; Game Gear, Genesis, Master System)
  - Alien³ (1992; Amiga, Commodore 64, Game Gear, Genesis, Master System, SNES, NES, Game Boy)
  - Alien vs. Predator (1993; SNES)
  - Alien vs. Predator: The Last of His Clan (1993; Game Boy)
  - Alien 3: The Gun (1993; arcade)
  - Alien vs. Predator (1994; arcade)
  - Alien vs Predator (1994; Jaguar)
  - Aliens: A Comic Book Adventure (1995; DOS)
  - Alien Trilogy (1996; PlayStation, Sega Saturn, MS-DOS)
  - Aliens Online (1998; Microsoft Windows)
  - Aliens versus Predator (1999; Microsoft Windows, Mac OS)
  - Alien: Resurrection (2000; PlayStation)
  - Aliens: Thanatos Encounter (2001; Game Boy Color)
  - Aliens versus Predator 2 (2001; Microsoft Windows, OS X)
    - Aliens versus Predator 2: Primal Hunt (2002; Microsoft Windows)
  - Aliens Versus Predator: Extinction (2003; PlayStation 2, Xbox)
  - Aliens: Unleashed (2003; BREW, J2ME)
  - Alien vs. Predator (2004; mobile phones)
  - Predator (2004; mobile phone)
  - Alien vs. Predator (2004; mobile phone)
  - Predator: Concrete Jungle (2005; PlayStation 2, Xbox)
  - Alien vs. Predator 3D (2005; mobile phone)
  - Aliens: Extermination (2006; arcade)
  - Aliens vs. Predator: Requiem (2007; PlayStation Portable)
  - Alien vs. Predator 2 2D: Requiem (2007; mobile phone)
  - Predator: The Duel (2008; mobile phone)
  - Aliens vs. Predator (2010; Microsoft Windows, PlayStation 3, Xbox 360)
  - Predators (2010; iOS)
  - Aliens: Infestation (2011; Nintendo DS)
  - Aliens: Colonial Marines (2013; Microsoft Windows, PlayStation 3, Xbox 360)
  - Alien Vs. Predator: Evolution (2013; Android, iOS)
  - Aliens: Armageddon (2013; Android, iOS)
  - Alien: Isolation (2014; Microsoft Windows, PlayStation 3, PlayStation 4, Xbox 360, Xbox One, Linux, OS X)
- Andy Capp: The Game (1987; Commodore 64, Amstrad CPC, ZX Spectrum)
- Aquaman:
  - Aquaman: Battle for Atlantis (2003; Xbox, GameCube)
- Armorines: Project S.W.A.R.M. (1999; Nintendo 64, PlayStation, Game Boy Color)
- Asterix:
  - Asterix (1983; Atari 2600)
  - Asterix and the Magic Cauldron (1986; Commodore 64, Amstrad CPC, ZX Spectrum)
  - Asterix and the Magic Carpet (1987; Commodore 64, DOS, Amiga 500, Atari ST, Amstrad CPC)
  - Asterix: Operation Getafix (1989; Amiga 500, Atari ST, DOS)
  - Asterix (1992; arcade)
  - Asterix (1993; NES, SNES, Master System, Game Boy)
  - Asterix and the Great Rescue (1993; Genesis, Game Gear, Master System)
  - Asterix and the Secret Mission (1993; Master System, Game Gear)
  - Asterix and the Power of the Gods (1995; Genesis)
  - Asterix & Obelix (1995; MS-DOS, SNES, Game Boy, Game Boy Color)
  - Asterix and Obelix Take on Caesar (1999; PlayStation, Microsoft Windows)
  - Asterix: The Gallic War (1999; PlayStation, Microsoft Windows)
  - Asterix: Search for Dogmatix (2000; Game Boy)
  - Asterix: Mega Madness (2001; PlayStation, Microsoft Windows)
  - Asterix & Obelix: Bash Them All! (2002; Game Boy Advance)
  - Asterix & Obelix XXL (2004; PlayStation 2, GameCube, Microsoft Windows, Game Boy Advance)
  - Asterix & Obelix XXL 2: Mission: Las Vegum (2005; PlayStation 2, Microsoft Windows)
    - Asterix & Obelix XXL 2: Mission: Wifix (2006; Nintendo DS, PlayStation Portable)
  - Asterix at the Olympic Games (2007; Microsoft Windows, Wii, PlayStation 2, Nintendo DS)
- The Avengers:
  - Captain America and The Avengers (1991; arcade, NES, SNES, Genesis, Game Gear, Game Boy)
  - Avengers in Galactic Storm (1995; arcade)
  - Marvel: Avengers Alliance (2012; Facebook, iOS, Android, Microsoft Windows, Playdom.com)
  - Marvel Avengers: Battle for Earth (2012; Xbox 360, Wii U)
  - Lego Marvel's Avengers (2016; Microsoft Windows, Nintendo 3DS, OS X, PlayStation 3, PlayStation 4, PlayStation Vita, Wii U, Xbox 360, Xbox One)
  - Avengers (2020, Microsoft Windows, PlayStation 4, PlayStation 5, Xbox One, Xbox Series X/S, Stadia)

== B ==
- Batman:
  - Batman (1986; Amstrad CPC, ZX Spectrum, MSX, Amstrad PCW)
  - Batman: The Caped Crusader (1988; Amiga, Amstrad CPC, Atari ST, Commodore 64, Apple II, MS-DOS, ZX Spectrum)
  - Batman (1989; Amiga, Amstrad CPC, Atari ST, Commodore 64, MS-DOS, ZX Spectrum)
  - Batman: The Video Game (1989; NES, Game Boy, Genesis)
  - Batman: The Video Game (1990; TurboGrafx-16)
  - Batman (1990; arcade)
  - Batman: Return of the Joker (1991; Genesis, NES, Game Boy)
  - Batman Returns (1992; Amiga, Atari Lynx, Game Gear, Master System, Genesis, Sega-CD, MS-DOS, NES, SNES)
  - Batman: The Animated Series (1993; Game Boy)
  - The Adventures of Batman & Robin (1994; SNES, Genesis, Game Gear)
  - Batman Forever (1995; SNES, Genesis, Game Boy, Game Gear, Microsoft Windows)
  - The Adventures of Batman and Robin Activity Center (1996; Microsoft Windows, Mac OS)
  - Batman Forever: The Arcade Game (1996; arcade, Sega Saturn, Microsoft Windows, PlayStation)
  - Batman & Robin (1997; Game.com, PlayStation)
  - Batman Beyond: Return of the Joker (2000; Nintendo 64, PlayStation, Game Boy Color)
  - Batman: Chaos in Gotham (2001; Game Boy Color)
  - Batman: Gotham City Racer (2001; PlayStation)
  - Batman: Vengeance (2001; Microsoft Windows, PlayStation 2, Xbox, GameCube, Game Boy Advance)
  - Batman: Dark Tomorrow (2003; Xbox, GameCube)
  - Batman: Justice Unbalanced (2003; Microsoft Windows, OS X)
  - Batman: Toxic Chill (2003; PC, Mac OS X)
  - Batman: Rise of Sin Tzu (2003; GameCube, PlayStation 2, Xbox, Game Boy Advance)
  - Batman Begins (2005; Xbox, PlayStation 2, GameCube, Game Boy Advance)
  - Lego Batman: The Videogame (2008; Wii, PlayStation 3, Xbox 360, PlayStation 2, Nintendo DS, Microsoft Windows, OS X)
  - Batman: Arkham Asylum (2009; PlayStation 3, Xbox 360, Microsoft Windows, OS X)
  - Batman: The Brave and the Bold – The Videogame (2011; Wii, Nintendo DS)
  - Batman: Arkham City (2011; PlayStation 3, Xbox 360, Microsoft Windows, Wii U, OS X)
  - Lego Batman 2: DC Super Heroes (2012; Microsoft Windows, PlayStation 3, PlayStation Vita, Nintendo 3DS, Wii, Xbox 360, OS X)
  - The Dark Knight Rises (2012; Android, iOS)
  - Batman: Arkham Origins (2013; PlayStation 3, Xbox 360, Microsoft Windows, Wii U)
  - Batman: Arkham Origins Blackgate (2013; PlayStation Vita, Nintendo 3DS, PlayStation 3, Wii U, Microsoft Windows, Xbox 360)
  - Batman (2013; arcade)
  - Lego Batman 3: Beyond Gotham (2014; Android, iOS, OS X, Xbox 360, Xbox One, Wii U, PlayStation 3, PlayStation 4, PlayStation Vita, Microsoft Windows, Nintendo 3DS)
  - Batman: Arkham Knight (2015; Microsoft Windows, PlayStation 4, Xbox One)
  - Batman: Arkham VR (2016; PlayStation 4, Microsoft Windows)
  - Batman: Return to Arkham (2016; PlayStation 4, Xbox One)
  - Batman: The Telltale Series (2016; Microsoft Windows, PlayStation 3, PlayStation 4, Xbox 360, Xbox One, Nintendo Switch)
  - Batman: The Enemy Within (2017; Microsoft Windows, PlayStation 3, PlayStation 4, Xbox 360, Xbox One, Nintendo Switch)
  - Gotham Knights (2021; Microsoft Windows, PlayStation 4, PlayStation 5, Xbox One, Xbox Series X/S)
  - Batman: Arkham Shadow (2024; Meta Quest 3, Meta Quest 3S)
  - Lego Batman: Legacy of the Dark Knight (2026; Microsoft Windows, Nintendo Switch 2, PlayStation 5, Xbox Series X/S)
- B.C.:
  - B.C.'s Quest for Tires (1983; Apple II, Atari 8-bit, ColecoVision, Commodore 64, MS-DOS, MSX, ZX Spectrum)
  - B.C. II: Grog's Revenge (1984; Commodore 64, MSX, ColecoVision, ZX Spectrum)
- Beanotown Racing (2003; Microsoft Windows)
- Blacksad
  - Blacksad: Under the Skin (2019; Nintendo Switch, Macintosh, PC, PlayStation 4, PlayStation 5, Xbox One, Xbox Series X)
- Blade:
  - Blade (2000; PlayStation, Game Boy Color)
  - Blade II (2002; PlayStation 2, Xbox)
  - Blade: Trinity (2004; mobile phone)
  - Marvel's Blade (TBA; Xbox Series X/S, Microsoft Windows)
- Blade Kitten (2010; Microsoft Windows, PlayStation 3, Xbox 360)
- Bone:
  - Bone: Out from Boneville (2005; Microsoft Windows, OS X)
  - Bone: The Great Cow Race (2006; Microsoft Windows)
- Bucky O'Hare
  - Bucky O'Hare (1992; arcade)
  - Bucky O'Hare (1992; NES)

== C ==
- Cadillacs and Dinosaurs:
  - Cadillacs and Dinosaurs (1993; arcade)
  - Cadillacs and Dinosaurs: The Second Cataclysm (1994; Sega CD, DOS)
- El Capitán Trueno (1989; Amstrad CPC, DOS, MSX, ZX Spectrum)
- Captain America:
  - Captain America in: The Doom Tube of Dr. Megalomann (1987; Commodore 64, ZX Spectrum, Amstrad CPC)
  - Spider-Man and Captain America in Doctor Doom's Revenge (1989; Amiga, Atari ST, Commodore 64, ZX Spectrum, Amstrad CPC, DOS)
  - Captain America and The Avengers (1991; arcade, SNES, NES, Dreamcast, Genesis, Game Boy, Game Gear)
  - Captain America: Super Soldier (2011; Nintendo DS, PlayStation 3, Wii, Xbox 360, Nintendo Nintendo 3DS)
  - Marvel 1943: Rise of Hydra (2026; TBA)
- Catwoman:
  - Catwoman (1999; Game Boy Color)
  - Catwoman (2004; GameCube, Microsoft Windows, PlayStation 2, Xbox, Game Boy Advance)
- Chakan: The Forever Man (1992; Genesis, Game Gear, Mega Drive)
- The Crow: City of Angels (1997; Sega Saturn, PlayStation, Microsoft Windows)

== D ==
- Dan Dare: Pilot of the Future (1986; Commodore 64, Amstrad CPC, ZX Spectrum)
- Danger Girl (2000; PlayStation)
- Daredevil (2003; Game Boy Advance)
- The Darkness:
  - The Darkness (2007; PlayStation 3, Xbox 360)
  - The Darkness II (2012; PlayStation 3, Xbox 360, Microsoft Windows, OS X)
- Darksiders:
  - Darksiders (2010; Xbox 360, Xbox One, PlayStation 3, PlayStation 4, Nintendo Switch, Microsoft Windows, Linux)
  - Darksiders II (2012; Xbox 360, Xbox One, PlayStation 3, PlayStation 4, Nintendo Switch, Microsoft Windows, Linux)
  - Darksiders III (2018; Xbox One, PlayStation 4, Microsoft Windows)
- DC Universe:
  - Mortal Kombat vs. DC Universe (2008; PlayStation 3, Xbox 360)
  - DC Universe Online (2011; PlayStation 3, PlayStation 4, Microsoft Windows, Xbox One, OS X)
  - Injustice: Gods Among Us (2013; PlayStation 3, Xbox 360, Wii U, Microsoft Windows, PlayStation Vita, PlayStation 4, Android, iOS)
  - Injustice 2 (2017; PlayStation 4, Xbox One, Microsoft Windows, Android, iOS)
  - DC Super Hero Girls: Teen Power (2021; Nintendo Switch)
  - DC League of Super-Pets: The Adventures of Krypto and Ace (2022; Microsoft Windows, Nintendo Switch, PlayStation 4, PlayStation 5, Xbox One, Xbox Series X/S)
- Deadpool (2013; PlayStation 3, Xbox 360, Microsoft Windows, PlayStation 4, Xbox One)
- Dennis the Menace (1993; SNES, Game Boy)
- Dick Tracy:
  - Dick Tracy (Amiga, Amstrad CPC, Atari ST, Commodore 64, DOS, ZX Spectrum, Genesis, Master System, NES, Game Boy)
  - Dick Tracy: The Crime-Solving Adventure (1991; Amiga, DOS)
- Dinosaurs for Hire (1993; Genesis)
- Druuna: Morbus Gravis (2001; Microsoft Windows)
- Duckman: The Graphic Adventures of a Private Dick (1997; Microsoft Windows)

== E ==
- Elektra (2005; mobile phone)
- Ex-Mutants (1992; Genesis)

== F ==
- Fantastic Four:
  - Questprobe: Featuring Human Torch and the Thing (1985; Amstrad CPC, Apple II, Atari 8-bit, Commodore 64, DOS, ZX Spectrum)
  - Fantastic Four (1997; PlayStation)
  - Fantastic Four (2005; Microsoft Windows, PlayStation 2, Xbox, GameCube, Game Boy Advance)
  - Fantastic 4: Flame On (2005; Game Boy Advance)
  - Fantastic Four (2005; TV)
  - Fantastic Four: Rise of the Silver Surfer (2007; PlayStation 2, PlayStation 3, Xbox 360, Wii, Nintendo DS)
- The Flash:
  - The Flash (1991; Game Boy)
  - The Flash (1993; Master System)
  - Justice League Heroes: The Flash (2006; Game Boy Advance)

== G ==
- Garfield:
  - Garfield (cancelled; Atari 2600)
  - Create with Garfield (1986; Commodore 64)
  - Garfield: Big Fat Hairy Deal (1987; ZX Spectrum, Commodore 64, Amstrad CPC, Amiga, Atari ST)
  - Garfield: Winter's Tail (1989; Atari ST, Amiga, ZX Spectrum, Commodore 64)
  - A Week of Garfield (1989; NES)
  - The Real Ghostbusters (1992; Game Boy)
  - Garfield: Caught in the Act (1995; Genesis, Game Gear, IBM PC)
    - Garfield: The Lost Levels (1996; Genesis via Sega Channel)
  - Garfield's Mad About Cats (2000; Microsoft Windows, Mac OS)
  - Garfield: Robocats from Outer Space! (2003; mobile phone)
  - Garfield: The Bubble' (2003; mobile phone)
  - Garfield (2004; PlayStation 2, Microsoft Windows)
  - Garfield: Attack of the Mutant Lasagna (2003; mobile phone)
  - Garfield: The Search for Pooky (2004; Game Boy Advance)
  - Garfield: It's All About Phonics - Kindergarten (2004; Microsoft Windows)
  - Garfield: Saving Arlene (2005; PlayStation 2, Microsoft Windows)
  - Garfield: A Tail of Two Kitties (2006; PlayStation 2, Microsoft Windows, Nintendo DS)
  - Garfield's Day Out (2004; mobile phones)
  - Garfield and His Nine Lives (2006; Game Boy Advance)
  - Garfield's Nightmare (2007; Nintendo DS, Game Boy Advance)
  - Garfield Gets Real (2008; Wii, Nintendo DS)
  - Garfield's Fun Fest (2008; Nintendo DS)
  - Garfield Kart (2013; Macintosh, Microsoft Windows, Nintendo 3DS, iOS, Android)
    - Garfield Kart: Furious Racing (2019; Microsoft Windows, PS4, Xbox One, Nintendo Switch)
    - Garfield Kart 2 (2025; Microsoft Windows, Nintendo Switch, PlayStation 4, PlayStation 5, Xbox One, Xbox Series X/S)
  - Garfield: Living Large! (2014; iOS)
  - Garfield Lasagna Party (2022; Microsoft Windows, Nintendo Switch, PlayStation 4, PlayStation 5, Xbox One, Xbox Series X/S)
- Generator Rex: Agent of Providence (2011; Nintendo DS, Nintendo 3DS, Wii, PlayStation 3, Xbox 360)
- Ghost Rider (2007; PlayStation 2, PlayStation Portable, Game Boy Advance)
- Green Lantern:
  - Green Lantern: Rise of the Manhunters (2011; PlayStation 3, Xbox 360, Wii, Nintendo DS, Nintendo 3DS)

== H ==
- Heathcliff:
  - Heathcliff: Fun with Spelling (1984; Atari 8-bit, Commodore 64)
  - Heathcliff: Frantic Foto (2010; Nintendo DS)
  - Heathcliff: The Fast and the Furriest (2010; Wii)
  - Heathcliff: Spot On (2013; Nintendo DS)
- Heavy Metal:
  - Heavy Metal: F.A.K.K.² (2000; Microsoft Windows, Mac OS, Linux)
  - Heavy Metal: Geomatrix (2001; arcade, Dreamcast)
- Hellboy:
  - Hellboy: Dogs of the Night (2000; Microsoft Windows)
    - Hellboy: Asylum Seeker (2004; PlayStation)
  - Hellboy: The Science of Evil (2008; PlayStation 3, Xbox 360, PlayStation Portable)
  - Hellboy Web of Wyrd (2023; Nintendo Switch, PlayStation 4, PlayStation 5, Microsoft Windows, Xbox One, Xbox Series X/S)
- Hulk:
  - Questprobe featuring The Hulk (1984; Acorn Electron, Atari 8-bit, BBC Micro, Commodore 64, DOS, Dragon 32, ZX Spectrum)
  - The Incredible Hulk (1994; SNES, Genesis, Master System, Game Gear)
  - The Incredible Hulk: The Pantheon Saga (1996; PlayStation, Sega Saturn)
  - Hulk (2003; Microsoft Windows, PlayStation 2, Xbox, GameCube, Game Boy Advance)
  - The Incredible Hulk (2003; Game Boy Advance)
  - The Incredible Hulk: Ultimate Destruction (2005; PlayStation 2, Xbox, GameCube)
  - The Incredible Hulk (2008; PlayStation 3, Xbox 360, PlayStation 2, Wii, Microsoft Windows, PlayStation Portable, Nintendo DS)

== I ==
- Iron Man:
  - Iron Man and X-O Manowar in Heavy Metal (1996; PlayStation, Sega Saturn, Game Boy, Game Gear, DOS)
  - The Invincible Iron Man (2002; Game Boy Advance)
  - Iron Man (2008; PlayStation 2, PlayStation 3, PlayStation Portable, Wii, Nintendo DS, Xbox 360, Microsoft Windows, mobile phone)
  - Iron Man 2 (2010; PlayStation 3, Wii, Xbox 360, PlayStation Portable, Nintendo DS, iOS, BlackBerry)
  - Marvel's Iron Man VR (2020; PlayStation 4, Meta Quest 2, Meta Quest Pro, Meta Quest 3)

== J ==
- Jabato (1989; ZX Spectrum, Amstrad CPC, Commodore 64, MSX, Atari ST, DOS, Amiga)
- Judge Dredd:
  - Judge Dredd (cancelled; arcade)
  - Judge Dredd (1986; Commodore 64, ZX Spectrum)
  - Judge Dredd (1990; Amiga, Atari ST, Commodore 64)
  - Judge Dredd (1995; SNES, Genesis, Game Gear, Game Boy)
  - Judge Dredd (1997; arcade, PlayStation, PlayStation 3, PlayStation Portable, PlayStation Vita)
  - Judge Dredd Pinball (1998; DOS, Microsoft Windows)
  - Judge Dredd: Dredd vs. Death (2003; Microsoft Windows, Xbox, PlayStation 2, GameCube)
  - Judge Dredd vs. Zombies (2011; mobile phone)
  - Judge Dredd: Countdown Sector 106 (2012; Android, iOS, Linux, OS X, Microsoft Windows)
- Justice League:
  - Justice League Task Force (1995; SNES, Genesis)
  - Justice League: Injustice for All (2002; Game Boy Advance)
  - Justice League: Chronicles (2003; Game Boy Advance)
  - Justice League Heroes (2006; PS2, Xbox, PlayStation Portable, Nintendo DS)
    - Justice League Heroes: The Flash (2006; Game Boy Advance)
  - Justice League Heroes United (2009; arcade)
  - Justice League: Cosmic Chaos (2023; Microsoft Windows, Nintendo Switch, PlayStation 4, PlayStation 5, Xbox One, Xbox Series X/S)

== K ==
- Kiss: Psycho Circus: The Nightmare Child (2000; Microsoft Windows, Dreamcast)

== L ==
- Largo Winch: Empire Under Threat (2002; Xbox, PlayStation 2, GameCube, Microsoft Windows)
- Little Gamers (2008; Xbox 360)
- Little Nemo
  - Little Nemo: The Dream Master (1990; NES)
  - Nemo (1990; arcade)

== M ==
- Marvel Comics
  - Marvel Super Heroes (1995; arcade, Sega Saturn, PlayStation)
  - Marvel Super Heroes: War of the Gems (1996; SNES)
  - Marvel Super Heroes vs. Street Fighter (1997; arcade, Sega Saturn, PlayStation)
  - Marvel vs. Capcom: Clash of Super Heroes (1998; arcade, Dreamcast, PlayStation, PlayStation 3, Xbox 360)
  - Marvel vs. Capcom 2: New Age of Heroes (2000; arcade, Dreamcast, iOS, PlayStation 2, PlayStation 3, Xbox, Xbox 360)
  - Marvel Nemesis: Rise of the Imperfects (2005; PlayStation 2, Xbox, GameCube, PlayStation Portable, Nintendo DS)
  - Marvel: Ultimate Alliance (2006; Xbox, PlayStation 2, Microsoft Windows, Xbox 360, Game Boy Advance, PlayStation Portable, Wii, PlayStation 3)
  - Marvel: Ultimate Alliance 2 (2009; PlayStation 2, Xbox 360, Nintendo DS, PlayStation Portable, Wii, PlayStation 3)
  - Marvel vs. Capcom 3: Fate of Two Worlds (2011; PlayStation 3, Xbox 360)
  - Marvel vs. Capcom: Infinite (2017; PlayStation 4, Xbox One, Microsoft Windows)
  - Marvel Heroes (2013; Microsoft Windows)
  - Lego Marvel Super Heroes (2013; Android, iOS, Microsoft Windows, Nintendo 3DS, Nintendo DS, OS X, PlayStation 3, PlayStation 4, PlayStation Vita, Wii U, Xbox 360, Xbox One)
  - Marvel's Midnight Suns (2022; PlayStation 4, PlayStation 5, Microsoft Windows, Xbox One, Xbox Series X/S)
  - Marvel Rivals (2024; MacOS, PlayStation 5, Windows, Xbox Series X/S)
- The Mask (1995; SNES)
- The Men in Black:
  - Men in Black: The Game (1997; PlayStation, Microsoft Windows)
  - Men in Black: The Series (1998; Game Boy, Game Boy Advance)
  - Men in Black 2: The Series (1998; Game Boy)
  - Men in Black: The Series – Crashdown (2001; PlayStation)
  - Men in Black II: Alien Escape (2002; PlayStation 2, GameCube)
  - MIB: Alien Crisis (2012; PlayStation 3, Wii, Xbox 360)
- Mort & Phil:
  - Clever & Smart (1987; Amiga, Amstrad CPC, Atari ST, Commodore 64, ZX Spectrum)
  - Clever & Smart 2 (1989; Amstrad CPC, Amstrad PCW, DOS, MSX, ZX Spectrum)

== O ==
- Over the Hedge:
  - Over the Hedge (2006; GameCube, PlayStation 2, Microsoft Windows, Xbox)
  - Over the Hedge (2006; Nintendo DS)
  - Over the Hedge: Hammy Goes Nuts! (2006; Game Boy Advance, Nintendo DS, PlayStation Portable)

== P ==
- Peanuts:
  - Snoopy and the Red Baron (1984; Atari 2600)
  - Snoopy (1984; Commodore 64)
  - Charlie Brown's ABCs (1984; Commodore 64, Apple II)
  - Snoopy's Silly Sports Spectacular (1988; NES)
  - Snoopy: The Cool Computer Game (1989; Amiga, Amstrad CPC, Atari ST, CDTV, DOS, ZX Spectrum)
  - Snoopy's Magic Show (1990; Game Boy)
  - Snoopy In ''The Case Of The Missing Blanket'' (1991; Amiga)
  - Snoopy Concert (1995; Super Famicom)
  - Snoopy's Campfire Stories (1996; Microsoft Windows, Mac OS)
  - Snoopy Tennis (2001, Game Boy Color)
  - Where's the Blanket Charlie Brown? (2002; Microsoft Windows, OS X)
  - Snoopy vs. the Red Baron (2006; PlayStation 2, Microsoft Windows, PlayStation Portable)
  - Peanuts: It's the Big Game, Charlie Brown! (2007; OS X, Microsoft Windows)
  - Snoopy Flying Ace (2010; Xbox Live Arcade)
  - The Peanuts Movie: Snoopy's Grand Adventure (2015; Nintendo 3DS, PS4, Wii U, Xbox 360, Xbox One)
- Penny Arcade:
  - Penny Arcade Adventures: On the Rain-Slick Precipice of Darkness (2008; Xbox 360, Microsoft Windows, Linux, OS X)
- Popeye:
  - Popeye (1982; arcade, Commodore 64, NES, Magnavox Odyssey², ColecoVision, Atari 2600)
  - Popeye no Eigo Asobi (1983; NES)
  - Popeye (1990; Game Boy)
  - Popeye 2 (1991; Game Boy)
  - Popeye: Ijiwaru Majo Seahag no Maki (1994; Super Famicom)
  - Popeye Saves the Earth (1994; arcade)
  - Popeye: Rush for Spinach (2005; Game Boy Advance)
- The Punisher:
  - The Punisher (1990 NES)
  - The Punisher (1990; DOS, Atari ST, Amiga)
  - The Punisher: The Ultimate Payback! (Game Boy)
  - The Punisher (1993; arcade, Genesis)
  - The Punisher (2004; mobile phone, PlayStation 2, Xbox, Microsoft Windows)
  - The Punisher: No Mercy (2009; PlayStation 3)

== R ==
- Ragnarok:
  - Ragnarok Online (2002; Microsoft Windows)
  - Ragnarok Battle Offline (2007; Microsoft Windows)
  - Ragnarok Online 2: The Gate of the World (2007; Microsoft Windows)
  - Ragnarok Online Nintendo DS (2008; Nintendo DS)
- RoboCop Versus The Terminator (1994; Game Boy, Genesis, SNES, Master System)
- The Rocketeer:
  - The Rocketeer (1991; NES)
  - The Rocketeer (1991; PC, SNES)
- Rogue Trooper:
  - Rogue Trooper (1986; Commodore 64, Amstrad CPC, ZX Spectrum)
  - Rogue Trooper (1990; Amiga, Atari ST)
  - Rogue Trooper (2006; PC, PlayStation 2, Xbox, Wii)

== S ==
- Sam & Max:
  - Sam & Max: Freelance Police (cancelled; Microsoft Windows)
  - Sam & Max Hit the Road (1993; DOS, Mac OS, Microsoft Windows)
  - Sam & Max Save the World (2006; Microsoft Windows, Wii, Xbox 360)
  - Sam & Max Beyond Time and Space (2007; Microsoft Windows, Xbox 360, Wii, OS X, PlayStation 3, iOS)
- Scott Pilgrim vs. the World: The Game (2010; PlayStation 3, Xbox 360)
- Scott Pilgrim EX (2026; Nintendo Switch, Nintendo Switch 2, Playstation 4, Playstation 5, Xbox One, Xbox Series X/S, Microsoft Windows)
- Scud: The Disposable Assassin:
  - Scud: The Disposable Assassin (1997; Sega Saturn)
  - Scud: Industrial Revolution (1997; Microsoft Windows)
- Shadow Man:
  - Shadow Man (1999; Nintendo 64, PlayStation, Dreamcast, Microsoft Windows, Mac OS)
  - Shadow Man: 2econd Coming (2002; PlayStation 2)
- Silver Surfer:
  - Silver Surfer (1990; NES)
  - Fantastic Four: Rise of the Silver Surfer (2007; PlayStation 2, PlayStation 3, Xbox 360, Wii, Nintendo DS)
- The Smurfs:
  - Smurfette's Birthday (cancelled; Atari 2600)
  - Smurf: Rescue in Gargamel's Castle (1982; Atari 2600, ColecoVision)
  - The Smurfs Save the Day (1983; Atari 2600)
  - Smurf: Paint 'n' Play Workshop (1984; ColecoVision)
  - The Smurfs (1993; Game Boy, Game Gear, NES, Master System)
  - The Smurfs (1994; DOS, Genesis, Sega-CD, SNES, Microsoft Windows)
  - The Smurfs: Travel the World (1995; SNES, Genesis, Master System, Game Boy)
  - The Smurfs' Nightmare (1997; Game Boy, Game Boy Color)
  - The Smurfs (1999; PlayStation)
  - Smurf Racer (2001; PlayStation, Microsoft Windows)
  - The Revenge of the Smurfs (2002, Game Boy Advance)
- Spawn:
  - Todd McFarlane's Spawn: The Video Game (1995; SNES)
  - Spawn: The Eternal (1997; PlayStation)
  - Spawn (1999; Game Boy Color)
  - Spawn: In the Demon's Hand (2000; arcade, Dreamcast)
  - Spawn: Armageddon (2003; GameCube, PlayStation 2, Xbox)
- Spider-Man:
  - The Amazing Spider-Man (1980; arcade)
  - Spider-Man (1982; Atari 2600)
  - Questprobe featuring Spider-Man (1984; Apple II, Atari 8-bit, Atari ST, BBC Micro, Commodore Plus/4, Commodore 64, DOS, Electron, ZX Spectrum)
  - Spider-Man and Captain America in Doctor Doom's Revenge (1989; Amiga, Atari ST, Commodore 64, ZX Spectrum, Amstrad CPC, DOS)
  - The Amazing Spider-Man (1990; Game Boy)
  - The Amazing Spider-Man (1990; Amiga, DOS, Commodore 64, Atari ST)
  - Spider-Man: The Video Game (1991; arcade)
  - The Amazing Spider-Man vs. The Kingpin (1991; Genesis, Master System, Game Gear, Sega CD)
  - Spider-Man and the X-Men in Arcade's Revenge (1992; SNES, Genesis, Game Gear, Game Boy)
  - Spider-Man: Return of the Sinister Six (1992; NES, Master System, Game Gear)
  - The Amazing Spider-Man 2 (1992; Game Boy)
  - The Amazing Spider-Man 3: Invasion of the Spider-Slayers (1993; Game Boy)
  - Spider-Man (1994; SNES, Genesis)
  - Spider-Man and Venom: Maximum Carnage (1994; SNES, Genesis)
  - The Amazing Spider-Man: Lethal Foes (1995; Super Famicom)
  - Venom/Spider-Man: Separation Anxiety (1995; SNES, Genesis, Microsoft Windows)
  - Spider-Man Animated Series (1995; SNES, Genesis)
  - Spider-Man Cartoon Maker (1995; Microsoft Windows)
  - Spider-Man: Web of Fire (1996; Sega 32X)
  - Spider-Man (2000; Dreamcast, OS X, Nintendo 64, PlayStation, Microsoft Windows, Game Boy Color)
  - Spider-Man 2: The Sinister Six (2001; Game Boy Color)
  - Spider-Man 2: Enter Electro (2001; PlayStation)
  - Spider-Man: Mysterio's Menace (2001; Game Boy Advance)
  - Spider-Man (2002; PlayStation 2, GameCube, Xbox, Game Boy Advance, Microsoft Windows)
  - Spider-Man 2 (2004; GameCube, Microsoft Windows, PlayStation 2, Xbox, Game Boy Advance, N-Gage, OS X, Nintendo DS, PlayStation Portable)
  - Ultimate Spider-Man (2005; Nintendo DS, GameCube, PlayStation 2, Xbox, Microsoft Windows, Game Boy Advance)
  - Spider-Man: Battle for New York (2006; Nintendo DS, Game Boy Advance)
  - Spider-Man: Friend or Foe (2007; Wii, Xbox 360, PlayStation 2, Microsoft Windows, Nintendo DS, PlayStation Portable)
  - Spider-Man 3 (2007; Game Boy Advance, Microsoft Windows, Xbox 360, PlayStation 2, PlayStation Portable, Nintendo Nintendo DS, Wii, PlayStation 3)
  - Spider-Man: Web of Shadows (2008; Microsoft Windows, Nintendo DS, PlayStation 2, PlayStation 3, PlayStation Portable, Wii, Xbox 360)
  - Spider-Man: Shattered Dimensions (2010; Xbox 360, PlayStation 3, Wii, Nintendo Nintendo DS, Microsoft Windows)
  - Spider-Man: Edge of Time (2011; Nintendo 3DS, Nintendo DS, PlayStation 3, Wii, Xbox 360)
  - The Amazing Spider-Man (2012; Nintendo DS, Nintendo 3DS, PlayStation 3, Wii, Xbox 360, Android, iOS, Microsoft Windows, Wii U, BlackBerry, PlayStation Vita, Windows Phone, mobile phone)
  - The Amazing Spider-Man 2 (2014; Android, iOS, Microsoft Windows, Nintendo 3DS, PlayStation 3, PlayStation 4, Wii U, Xbox 360, Xbox One)
  - Spider-Man (2018; PlayStation 4)
  - Spider-Man: Miles Morales (2020; PlayStation 4, PlayStation 5)
  - Spider-Man Remastered (2020; PlayStation 5)
  - Spider-Man 2 (2023; PlayStation 5)
- Spy vs. Spy:
  - Spy vs. Spy (1984; Amiga, Amstrad CPC, Apple II, Atari 8-bit, Atari ST, BBC Micro, Commodore 16, Plus/4, Commodore 64, Electron, NES, PC-88, Sharp X1, Master System, ZX Spectrum)
  - Spy vs. Spy II: The Island Caper (1985; Amiga, Amstrad CPC, Apple II, Atari 8-bit, Atari ST, Commodore 64, MSX, Famicom, ZX Spectrum)
  - Spy vs. Spy III: Arctic Antics (1986; Amiga, Amstrad CPC, Apple II, Atari 8-bit, Atari ST, Commodore 64, DOS, ZX Spectrum)
  - Spy vs. Spy (2005; Xbox, PlayStation 2)
- Suicide Squad:
  - Suicide Squad: Kill the Justice League (2024; Microsoft Windows, PlayStation 5, Xbox Series X/S)
- Superman:
  - Superman (1978; Atari 2600)
  - Superman: The Game (1985; Commodore 64, ZX Spectrum, Commodore 16, Commodore Plus/4, BBC Micro, Acorn Electron)
  - Superman (1987; NES)
  - Superman (1988; arcade)
  - Superman: The Man of Steel (1989; Acorn Electron, Amiga, Amstrad CPC, Apple II, Atari ST, BBC Micro, Commodore 64, MSX, DOS, ZX Spectrum)
  - Superman (1992; Genesis)
  - Superman: The Man of Steel (1993; Game Gear, Master System)
  - The Death and Return of Superman (1994; SNES, Genesis)
  - Superman: The Mysterious Mr. Mist (1996; Mac OS, Microsoft Windows)
  - Superman (1997; Game Boy)
  - Superman: The New Adventures (1999; Nintendo 64)
  - Superman: The Mysterious Mr. Mist (2000; Microsoft Windows)
  - Superman: Shadow of Apokolips (2002; PlayStation 2, GameCube)
  - Superman: The Man of Steel (2002; Xbox)
  - Superman: Countdown to Apokolips (2003; Game Boy Advance)
  - Superman Returns: Fortress of Solitude (2006; Game Boy Advance)
  - Superman Returns (2006; Xbox 360, PlayStation 2, Xbox, Nintendo DS)
  - Superman: The Greatest Hero (2006; V.Smile)
  - Superman (2011; iOS)
- Swamp Thing (1992; Game Boy, NES)

== T ==
- Teen Titans:
  - Teen Titans (2005; Game Boy Advance)
  - Teen Titans (2006; PlayStation 2, Xbox, GameCube)
- Teenage Mutant Ninja Turtles:
  - Teenage Mutant Ninja Turtles (1989; NES, Amiga, Amstrad CPC, Atari ST, Commodore 64, DOS, MSX, ZX Spectrum, PlayChoice-10)
  - Teenage Mutant Ninja Turtles (1989; arcade, NES, Xbox Live Arcade, Amiga, Amstrad CPC, Atari ST, Commodore 64, DOS, ZX Spectrum)
  - Teenage Mutant Ninja Turtles: Fall of the Foot Clan (1990; Game Boy)
  - Teenage Mutant Ninja Turtles: Turtles in Time (1991; arcade, SNES)
  - Teenage Mutant Ninja Turtles II: Back from the Sewers (1991; Game Boy)
  - Teenage Mutant Ninja Turtles III: The Manhattan Project (1991; NES)
  - Teenage Mutant Ninja Turtles: Manhattan Missions (1991; DOS)
  - Teenage Mutant Ninja Turtles: The Hyperstone Heist (1992; Genesis)
  - Teenage Mutant Ninja Turtles III: Radical Rescue (1993; Game Boy)
  - Teenage Mutant Ninja Turtles: Tournament Fighters (1993; Genesis, SNES, NES)
  - Teenage Mutant Ninja Turtles (2003; Game Boy Advance)
  - Teenage Mutant Ninja Turtles (2003; PlayStation 2, Xbox, GameCube, Microsoft Windows)
  - Teenage Mutant Ninja Turtles 2: Battle Nexus (2004; Microsoft Windows, GameCube, PlayStation 2, Xbox, Game Boy Advance)
  - Teenage Mutant Ninja Turtles 3: Mutant Nightmare (2005; GameCube, PlayStation 2, Xbox, Nintendo DS)
  - Teenage Mutant Ninja Turtles: Mutant Melee (2005; Microsoft Windows, GameCube, PlayStation 2, Xbox)
  - TMNT (2007; Xbox 360, Wii, PlayStation 2, PlayStation Portable, Nintendo DS, Game Boy Advance, Microsoft Windows, GameCube)
  - Teenage Mutant Ninja Turtles: Arcade Attack (2009; Nintendo DS)
  - Teenage Mutant Ninja Turtles: Turtles in Time Re-Shelled (2009; Xbox 360, PlayStation 3)
  - Teenage Mutant Ninja Turtles: Smash-Up (2009; Wii, PlayStation 2)
  - Teenage Mutant Ninja Turtles: Out of the Shadows (2013; PlayStation 3, Xbox 360, Microsoft Windows)
  - Teenage Mutant Ninja Turtles (2013; Nintendo 3DS, Wii, Xbox 360)
  - Teenage Mutant Ninja Turtles: Danger of the Ooze (2014; Nintendo 3DS, PlayStation 3, Xbox 360)
  - Teenage Mutant Ninja Turtles: Training Lair (2014; Xbox 360)
  - Teenage Mutant Ninja Turtles: Mutants in Manhattan (2016; Microsoft Windows, PlayStation 3, PlayStation 4, Xbox 360, Xbox One)
- The Tick (1994; SNES, Genesis)
- Thief of Thieves: Season One (2018; Microsoft Windows, Xbox One)
- Thor:
  - Thor: God of Thunder (2011; Nintendo DS, PlayStation 3, Wii, Xbox 360 and Nintendo 3DS)
- Timecop (1995; SNES)
- The Adventures of Tintin:
  - Tintin on the Moon (1989; DOS, Commodore 64, Amiga, Atari ST, Amstrad CPC, ZX Spectrum)
  - Tintin in Tibet (1995; Game Boy, Game Boy Color, Game Gear, Genesis, SNES, Microsoft Windows, DOS)
  - Prisoners of the Sun (1996; Microsoft Windows, DOS, SNES, Game Boy, Game Boy Color)
  - Tintin: Destination Adventure (2001; Microsoft Windows, PlayStation)
  - The Adventures of Tintin: The Secret of the Unicorn (2011; Nintendo 3DS, PlayStation 3, Wii, Microsoft Windows, Xbox 360)
- Turok:
  - Turok: Dinosaur Hunter (1997; Nintendo 64, Microsoft Windows)
  - Turok 2: Seeds of Evil (1998; Nintendo 64, Game Boy, Microsoft Windows)
  - Turok: Battle of the Bionosaurs (1998; Game Boy)
  - Turok: Rage Wars (1999; Nintendo 64, Game Boy)
  - Turok 3: Shadow of Oblivion (1999; Nintendo 64, Game Boy)
  - Turok: Evolution (2002; PlayStation 2, Xbox, GameCube, Microsoft Windows, Game Boy Advance)
  - Turok (2008; PlayStation 3, Xbox 360, Microsoft Windows)

== U ==
- Samurai Warrior: The Battles of Usagi Yojimbo (1988; Commodore 64, ZX Spectrum, Amstrad CPC)

== W ==
- Watchmen: The End Is Nigh (2009; PlayStation 3, Microsoft Windows, Xbox 360)
- Wildcats
  - Jim Lee's WildC.A.T.s: Covert Action Teams (1995; SNES)
- W.I.T.C.H. (2005; Game Boy Advance)
- The Wolf Among Us (2013; OS X, PlayStation 3, PlayStation 4, PlayStation Vita, Microsoft Windows, Xbox 360, Xbox One, Android, iOS)
- Wolverine (X-Men):
  - Wolverine (1991; NES)
  - Wolverine: Adamantium Rage (1994; SNES, Genesis)
  - X-Men: Wolverine's Rage (2001; Game Boy Color)
  - X2: Wolverine's Revenge (2003; GameCube, OS X, PlayStation 2, Microsoft Windows, Xbox, Game Boy Advance)
  - X-Men Origins: Wolverine (2009; Microsoft Windows, Nintendo DS, PlayStation 2, PlayStation 3, PlayStation Portable, Wii, Xbox 360)
  - Marvel's Wolverine (TBA; PlayStation 5)
- Wonder Woman:
  - Wonder Woman: Rise of the Warrior (2017; Android, iOS, Microsoft Windows)

== X ==
- X-Men:
  - X-Men: Madness in Murderworld (1989; DOS, Commodore 64, Amiga)
  - The Uncanny X-Men (1989; NES)
  - X-Men II: The Fall of the Mutants (1991; DOS)
  - Spider-Man and the X-Men in Arcade's Revenge (1992; SNES, Genesis, Game Gear, Game Boy)
  - X-Men (1992; arcade, PlayStation 3, Xbox 360, iOS, Android)
  - X-Men (1993; Genesis)
  - X-Men: Mutant Apocalypse (1994; SNES)
  - X-Men: Children of the Atom (1994; arcade, Sega Sega Saturn, DOS, PlayStation)
  - X-Men (1994; Game Gear)
  - X-Men: Gamesmaster's Legacy (1995; Game Gear)
  - X-Men 2: Clone Wars (1995; Genesis)
  - X-Men vs. Street Fighter (1996; arcade, Sega Saturn, PlayStation)
  - X-Men: Mojo World (1996; Game Gear, Master System)
  - X-Men: The Ravages of Apocalypse (1997; Microsoft Windows, MS-DOS, Linux, Mac OS)
  - X-Men: Mutant Wars (2000; Game Boy Color)
  - X-Men: Mutant Academy (2000; PlayStation, Game Boy)
  - X-Men: Mutant Academy 2 (2001; PlayStation)
  - X-Men: Reign of Apocalypse (2001; Game Boy Advance)
  - X-Men: Next Dimension (2002; Xbox, PlayStation 2, GameCube)
  - X-Men Legends (2004; PlayStation 2, Xbox, GameCube, N-Gage)
  - X-Men Legends II: Rise of Apocalypse (2005; GameCube, Microsoft Windows, N-Gage, PlayStation 2, PlayStation Portable, Xbox, mobile phone)
  - X-Men: The Official Game (2006; Game Boy Advance, Microsoft Windows, Nintendo DS, GameCube, PlayStation 2, Xbox, Xbox 360)
  - X-Men: Destiny (2011; PlayStation 3, Xbox360, Nintendo Wii, Nintendo DS)

== Y ==
- Young Justice: Legacy (2013; Nintendo 3DS, PlayStation 3, Xbox 360, Wii, Microsoft Windows)

== Z ==
- Zen the Intergalactic Ninja:
  - Zen: Intergalactic Ninja (1993; NES, Game Boy)
- Zipi y Zape (1989; ZX Spectrum, Amstrad CPC, MSX)

== See also ==
- List of video games based on DC Comics
- List of video games featuring Superman
- List of video games featuring Batman
- Marvel Games
- List of video games featuring Spider-Man
- List of video games featuring the Hulk
- List of Teenage Mutant Ninja Turtles video games
- List of The Smurfs video games
- List of Asterix games
- List of video games based on anime or manga
- List of video games based on films
- List of video games based on cartoons
- List of video games based on tabletop games
