= List of video games featuring the Hulk =

Logo of the 1962 comic book series The Incredible Hulk

The Hulk is a fictional superhero in the Marvel Comics universe who first appeared in the comic book series The Incredible Hulk in 1962. The Hulk's first appearance in a video game was the 1984 graphic adventure computer game Questprobe featuring The Hulk, and the character began making appearances on home and handheld consoles a decade later. An earlier game was originally planned by Parker Brothers for the Atari 2600 in 1983, but was canceled in the midst of the video game crash. Several companies have developed games based on the Hulk, including Adventure International, Probe Entertainment, Attention to Detail, Radical Entertainment, Edge of Reality, and Amaze Entertainment. The Hulk's standalone titles are often action games that pit the Hulk against supervillains in a beat 'em up format, with his human alter ego Bruce Banner occasionally appearing for stealth or puzzle elements. Apart from his standalone titles, the Hulk also appears in several other Marvel titles within an ensemble cast; in these appearances, he is occasionally accompanied by members of his own supporting cast, such as his archnemesis Abomination and his cousin She-Hulk.

== Standalone games ==
Game	Details
Questprobe featuring The Hulk Original release date(s): May 1, 1984	Release years by system: 1984 – Acorn Electron, Apple II, Atari 8-bit, BBC Micro, Commodore 64, Dragon 32, MS-DOS, ZX Spectrum
Questprobe featuring The Hulk Original release date(s): May 1, 1984	Notes: Graphic adventure game developed and published by Adventure International; The Hulk's first video game appearance
The Incredible Hulk Original release date(s): EU: June 1994; NA: July 1994	Release years by system: 1994 – Sega Genesis, Game Gear, Master System, Super Nintendo Entertainment System
The Incredible Hulk Original release date(s): EU: June 1994; NA: July 1994	Notes: Side-scrolling beat 'em up platform game developed by Probe Entertainment and published by U.S. Gold
The Incredible Hulk: The Pantheon Saga Original release date(s): April 10, 1997	Release years by system: 1997 – PlayStation, Sega Saturn
The Incredible Hulk: The Pantheon Saga Original release date(s): April 10, 1997	Notes: Beat 'em up game developed by Attention to Detail and published by Eidos Interactive; Based on the Pantheon storyline from the comic series; PC version was advertised, but not released
Hulk Original release date(s): NA: May 28, 2003; EU: June 13, 2003	Release years by system: 2003 – GameCube, Microsoft Windows, PlayStation 2, Xbox
Hulk Original release date(s): NA: May 28, 2003; EU: June 13, 2003	Notes: Action game developed by Radical Entertainment and published by Universal Interactive; Tie-in sequel to the film of the same name; Gameplay is divided between beat 'em up levels featuring the Hulk and stealth-based levels featuring Bruce Banner; Was released simultaneously with The Incredible Hulk
The Incredible Hulk Original release date(s): May 28, 2003	Release years by system: 2003 – Game Boy Advance
The Incredible Hulk Original release date(s): May 28, 2003	Notes: Isometric beat 'em up game developed by Pocket Studios and published by Universal Interactive; Was released simultaneously with Hulk to tie in with the film of the same name, but is based on the comics rather than the film
Fury of the Hulk Original release date(s): July 14, 2003	Release years by system: 2003 – BREW
Fury of the Hulk Original release date(s): July 14, 2003	Notes: Puzzle video game developed by Moviso and published by Universal Interactive
The Incredible Hulk: Ultimate Destruction Original release date(s): NA: August 23, 2005; EU: September 9, 2005	Release years by system: 2005 – GameCube, PlayStation 2, Xbox
The Incredible Hulk: Ultimate Destruction Original release date(s): NA: August 23, 2005; EU: September 9, 2005	Notes: Action-adventure game developed by Radical Entertainment and published by Vivendi Universal Games
The Incredible Hulk: Rampage! Original release date(s): March 15, 2006	Release years by system: 2006 – J2ME
The Incredible Hulk: Rampage! Original release date(s): March 15, 2006	Notes: Isometric action game developed and published by Mforma
The Incredible Hulk Original release date(s): NA: June 5, 2008; AU: June 26, 2008	Release years by system: 2008 – Microsoft Windows, PlayStation 2, PlayStation 3, Wii, Xbox 360
The Incredible Hulk Original release date(s): NA: June 5, 2008; AU: June 26, 2008	Notes: Action-adventure game developed by Edge of Reality and published by Sega; Tie-in to the Marvel Cinematic Universe film of the same name
The Incredible Hulk Original release date(s): NA: June 5, 2008; AU: June 12, 2008	Release years by system: 2008 – Nintendo DS
The Incredible Hulk Original release date(s): NA: June 5, 2008; AU: June 12, 2008	Notes: Side-scrolling platform game developed by Amaze Entertainment and published by Sega; Tie-in to the Marvel Cinematic Universe film of the same name
The Incredible Hulk Original release date(s): June 9, 2008	Release years by system: 2008 – Java
The Incredible Hulk Original release date(s): June 9, 2008	Notes: Action game developed and published by Hands-On Mobile; Tie-in to the Marvel Cinematic Universe film of the same name

== Related games ==
Game	Details
Marvel Super Heroes Original release date(s): November 1995	Release years by system: 1995 – Arcade; 1997 – PlayStation, Sega Saturn
Marvel Super Heroes Original release date(s): November 1995	Notes: Fighting game developed and published by Capcom; Features the Hulk as a playable character
Marvel Super Heroes In War of the Gems Original release date(s): October 1996	Release years by system: 1996 – Super Nintendo Entertainment System
Marvel Super Heroes In War of the Gems Original release date(s): October 1996	Notes: Side-scrolling action-adventure game developed and published by Capcom; Features the Hulk as a playable character and doppelgangers of She-Hulk as enemy characters
Marvel Super Heroes vs. Street Fighter Original release date(s): 1997	Release years by system: 1997 – Arcade; 1998 – Sega Saturn; 1999 – PlayStation
Marvel Super Heroes vs. Street Fighter Original release date(s): 1997	Notes: Fighting game developed and published by Capcom; Features the Hulk as a playable character
Fantastic Four Original release date(s): September 1997	Release years by system: 1997 – PlayStation
Fantastic Four Original release date(s): September 1997	Notes: Beat 'em up game developed by Probe Entertainment and published by Acclaim Entertainment; Features She-Hulk as a playable character
Marvel vs. Capcom: Clash of Super Heroes Original release date(s): 1998	Release years by system: 1998 – Arcade; 1999 – Dreamcast; 2000 – PlayStation
Marvel vs. Capcom: Clash of Super Heroes Original release date(s): 1998	Notes: Fighting game developed and published by Capcom; Features the Hulk as a playable character
Marvel vs. Capcom 2: New Age of Heroes Original release date(s): JP: March 23, 2000; NA: June 28, 2000	Release years by system: 2000 – Arcade, Dreamcast; 2002 – PlayStation 2, Xbox; 2009 – PlayStation 3, Xbox 360
Marvel vs. Capcom 2: New Age of Heroes Original release date(s): JP: March 23, 2000; NA: June 28, 2000	Notes: Fighting game developed and published by Capcom; Features the Hulk as a playable character
Marvel Nemesis: Rise of the Imperfects Original release date(s): NA: September 20, 2005	Release years by system: 2005 – GameCube, PlayStation 2, PlayStation Portable, Xbox
Marvel Nemesis: Rise of the Imperfects Original release date(s): NA: September 20, 2005	Notes: Fighting game developed by Nihilistic Software and published by EA Canada; The Hulk appears in the opening cinematic.
Marvel: Ultimate Alliance Original release date(s): NA: October 25, 2006	Release years by system: 2006 – Game Boy Advance, Microsoft Windows, PlayStation 2, PlayStation 3, PlayStation Portable, Wii, Xbox, Xbox 360; 2016 – PlayStation 4, Xbox One
Marvel: Ultimate Alliance Original release date(s): NA: October 25, 2006	Notes: Action role-playing game developed by Raven Software and published by Activision; Bruce Banner appears in a cutscene in the base game with Hulk also making a quick cameo in a cinematic towards the end of the game, while the "Heroes" add-on pack for the Xbox 360 version features the Hulk as a playable character.
Marvel: Ultimate Alliance 2 Original release date(s): NA: September 15, 2009	Release years by system: 2009 – Nintendo DS, PlayStation 2, PlayStation 3, PlayStation Portable, Wii, Xbox 360; 2016 – PlayStation 4, Xbox One
Marvel: Ultimate Alliance 2 Original release date(s): NA: September 15, 2009	Notes: Action role-playing game published by Activision and developed by Vicarious Visions for the PlayStation 3 and Xbox 360, by N-Space for the Nintendo DS, Playstation 2 and Wii, and by Savage Entertainment for the PlayStation Portable; Features the Hulk as a playable character; The console version features She-Hulk as a mini-boss, while the Nintendo DS version features her as a playable character.
Marvel Super Hero Squad Original release date(s): NA: October 20, 2009	Release years by system: 2009 – Nintendo DS, PlayStation 2, PlayStation Portable, Wii
Marvel Super Hero Squad Original release date(s): NA: October 20, 2009	Notes: Action game developed by Blue Tongue Entertainment and published by THQ; Features the Hulk as a playable character
Marvel Super Hero Squad: The Infinity Gauntlet Original release date(s): NA: November 16, 2010	Release years by system: 2010 – Nintendo DS, PlayStation 3, Wii, Xbox 360; 2011 – Nintendo 3DS
Marvel Super Hero Squad: The Infinity Gauntlet Original release date(s): NA: November 16, 2010	Notes: Action game developed by Griptonite Games and published by THQ; Features the Hulk as a playable character; The "Doom on the Loose" DLC features the Abomination as a playable character, while the Nintendo 3DS version includes him and She-Hulk as playable characters.
Marvel Pinball Original release date(s): December 8, 2010	Release years by system: 2010 – PlayStation 3, Xbox 360; 2012 – Nintendo 3DS
Marvel Pinball Original release date(s): December 8, 2010	Notes: Pinball game developed and published by Zen Studios; A table based on the World War Hulk storyline was released in 2012.; She-Hulk appears on the "Infinity Gauntlet", "Civil War", and "A-Force" tables.
Marvel vs. Capcom 3: Fate of Two Worlds Original release date(s): NA: February 15, 2011; JP: February 17, 2011; EU: February 18, 2011	Release years by system: 2011 – PlayStation 3, Xbox 360
Marvel vs. Capcom 3: Fate of Two Worlds Original release date(s): NA: February 15, 2011; JP: February 17, 2011; EU: February 18, 2011	Notes: Fighting game developed and published by Capcom; Features the Hulk and She-Hulk as playable characters
Marvel Super Hero Squad Online Original release date(s): April 29, 2011	Release years by system: 2011 – Microsoft Windows, Mac OSX
Marvel Super Hero Squad Online Original release date(s): April 29, 2011	Notes: Massively multiplayer online role-playing game developed by The Amazing Society and published by Gazillion Entertainment; Features the Hulk as a playable character
Marvel Super Hero Squad: Comic Combat Original release date(s): NA: November 15, 2011; EU: November 17, 2011; AU: November 17, 2011	Release years by system: 2011 – PlayStation 3, Wii, Xbox 360
Marvel Super Hero Squad: Comic Combat Original release date(s): NA: November 15, 2011; EU: November 17, 2011; AU: November 17, 2011	Notes: Action game developed by Griptonite Games and published by THQ; Features the Hulk as a playable character
The Avengers: The Mobile Game Original release date(s): May 7, 2012	Release years by system: 2012 – iOS, Android
The Avengers: The Mobile Game Original release date(s): May 7, 2012	Notes: Side-scrolling beat 'em up developed and published by Gameloft; Based on and released in conjunction with the 2012 film The Avengers; Features the Hulk as a playable character
Marvel Avengers: Battle for Earth Original release date(s): NA: October 30, 2012	Release years by system: 2012 – Xbox 360, Wii U
Marvel Avengers: Battle for Earth Original release date(s): NA: October 30, 2012	Notes: Fighting game developed by Ubisoft Quebec and published by Ubisoft; Features the Hulk as a playable character
Marvel Heroes Original release date(s): June 4, 2013	Release years by system: 2013 - Microsoft Windows, macOS
Marvel Heroes Original release date(s): June 4, 2013	Notes: Free-to-play massively multiplayer online action role-playing game developed and published by Gazillion Entertainment; Features the Hulk as a playable character
Marvel Puzzle Quest Original release date(s): October 3, 2013	Release years by system: 2013 – iOS, Android, Windows; 2015 – PlayStation 3, PlayStation 4, Xbox 360, Xbox One
Marvel Puzzle Quest Original release date(s): October 3, 2013	Notes: Puzzle video game developed by Demiurge Studios and published by D3 Publisher; Features the Hulk, Bruce Banner, She-Hulk, Red Hulk, and Amadeus Cho as playable characters
Lego Marvel Super Heroes Original release date(s): NA: October 22, 2013	Release years by system: 2013 - Microsoft Windows, PlayStation 3, PlayStation 4, PlayStation Vita, Wii U, Xbox 360, Xbox One, Nintendo 3DS; 2014 – iOS; 2021 – Nintendo Switch
Lego Marvel Super Heroes Original release date(s): NA: October 22, 2013	Notes: Action-adventure game developed by Traveller's Tales and published by Warner Bros. Interactive Entertainment; Features the Hulk as a playable character and the Abomination as a boss character; The "Super Pack" DLC features A-Bomb (Rick Jones) as a playable character.
Disney Infinity 2.0 Original release date(s): NA: September 14, 2014; AU: September 18, 2014; EU: September 18, 2014; UK: September 19, 2014	Release years by system: 2014 – iOS, Android, PlayStation 3, PlayStation 4, Wii U, Microsoft Windows, Xbox 360, Xbox One; 2015 – PlayStation Vita
Disney Infinity 2.0 Original release date(s): NA: September 14, 2014; AU: September 18, 2014; EU: September 18, 2014; UK: September 19, 2014	Notes: Action-adventure sandbox toys-to-life game developed by Avalanche Software and published by Disney Interactive; Features the Hulk as a playable character
Marvel Contest of Champions Original release date(s): December 10, 2014	Release years by system: 2014 – iOS, Android; 2019 – Arcade
Marvel Contest of Champions Original release date(s): December 10, 2014	Notes: Fighting game developed and published by Kabam; Features the Hulk as a playable character
Marvel: Future Fight Original release date(s): April 30, 2015	Release years by system: 2015 – iOS, Android
Marvel: Future Fight Original release date(s): April 30, 2015	Notes: Role-playing game developed and published by Netmarble Games; Features the Hulk, She-Hulk, Red She-Hulk, the Abomination, and Amadeus Cho as playable characters
Lego Marvel's Avengers Original release date(s): NA: January 26, 2016; PAL: January 29, 2016	Release years by system: 2016 – Microsoft Windows, Nintendo 3DS, PlayStation 3, PlayStation 4, PlayStation Vita, Wii U, Xbox 360, Xbox One
Lego Marvel's Avengers Original release date(s): NA: January 26, 2016; PAL: January 29, 2016	Notes: Action-adventure game developed by Traveller's Tales and published by Warner Bros. Interactive Entertainment; Features the Hulk, Hulkling, Red Hulk, She-Hulk, Amadeus Cho, and Lou Ferrigno (who portrayed the Hulk in the 1978 TV series) as playable characters
Marvel Avengers Academy Original release date(s): February 4, 2016	Release years by system: 2016 – iOS, Android
Marvel Avengers Academy Original release date(s): February 4, 2016	Notes: City-building game developed and published by TinyCo; Features the Hulk, Red Hulk and A-Bomb; The "World War Hulk" event features Skaar, the Ultimate Marvel version of Rick Jones, and the Abomination.
Marvel vs. Capcom: Infinite Original release date(s): WW: September 19, 2017; JP: September 21, 2017	Release years by system: 2017 – Microsoft Windows, PlayStation 4, Xbox One
Marvel vs. Capcom: Infinite Original release date(s): WW: September 19, 2017; JP: September 21, 2017	Notes: Fighting game developed and published by Capcom; Features the Hulk as a playable character
Lego Marvel Super Heroes 2 Original release date(s): November 14, 2017	Release years by system: 2017 – Microsoft Windows, Nintendo Switch, PlayStation 4, Xbox One; 2018 – MacOS
Lego Marvel Super Heroes 2 Original release date(s): November 14, 2017	Notes: Action-adventure game developed by Traveller's Tales and published by Warner Bros. Interactive Entertainment; Features the Hulk and She-Hulk as playable characters; Features Sakaar, the setting of the Planet Hulk storyline, as a playable level
Marvel Strike Force Original release date(s): March 28, 2018	Release years by system: 2018 – iOS, Android
Marvel Strike Force Original release date(s): March 28, 2018	Notes: Role-playing game developed and published by FoxNext; Features the Hulk and She-Hulk as playable characters
Marvel Ultimate Alliance 3: The Black Order Original release date(s): July 19, 2019	Release years by system: 2019 – Nintendo Switch
Marvel Ultimate Alliance 3: The Black Order Original release date(s): July 19, 2019	Notes: Action role-playing game developed by Team Ninja and published by Nintendo; Features the Hulk as a playable character
Marvel's Avengers Original release date(s): September 4, 2020	Release years by system: 2020 – Windows, PlayStation 4, Xbox One, Stadia; 2021 – Xbox Series X/S, PlayStation 5
Marvel's Avengers Original release date(s): September 4, 2020	Notes: Action role-playing game developed by Crystal Dynamics and published by Square Enix; Features the Hulk as a playable character and the Abomination as a boss character; The "Future Imperfect" DLC features the Maestro as a boss character.
Marvel Realm of Champions Original release date(s): December 16, 2020	Release years by system: 2020 – iOS, Android
Marvel Realm of Champions Original release date(s): December 16, 2020	Notes: Multiplayer online battle arena developed and published by Kabam; The game's premise involves the mysterious death of the Maestro.; Features Skaar as a playable character
Marvel Future Revolution Original release date(s): August 25, 2021	Release years by system: 2021 – iOS, Android
Marvel Future Revolution Original release date(s): August 25, 2021	Notes: Action role-playing game developed and published by Netmarble Games; Features the Hulk as a non-player character
Marvel Snap Original release date(s): October 18, 2022	Release years by system: 2022 – iOS, Android, Microsoft Windows
Marvel Snap Original release date(s): October 18, 2022	Notes: Collectible card game developed by Second Dinner and published by Nuverse; Features the Hulk and the Leader as playable characters
Marvel's Midnight Suns Original release date(s): December 2, 2022	Release years by system: 2022 – Microsoft Windows, PlayStation 5, Xbox Series X/S; 2023 – PlayStation 4, Xbox One
Marvel's Midnight Suns Original release date(s): December 2, 2022	Notes: Tactical role-playing game developed by Firaxis Games and published by 2K; Features the Hulk as an antagonist
Marvel Rivals Original release date(s): December 6, 2024	Release years by system: 2024 – Windows, Xbox Series X/S, Playstation 5
Marvel Rivals Original release date(s): December 6, 2024	Notes: Hero shooter developed and published by NetEase Games; Features the Hulk as a playable character
Marvel Mystic Mayhem Original release date(s): June 25, 2025	Release years by system: 2025 – iOS, Android
Marvel Mystic Mayhem Original release date(s): June 25, 2025	Notes: Tactical role-playing game developed and published by NetEase Games; Features the Hulk as a playable character
Marvel Tokon: Fighting Souls Original release date(s): August 6, 2026	Release years by system: 2026 – PlayStation 5, Microsoft Windows
Marvel Tokon: Fighting Souls Original release date(s): August 6, 2026	Notes: Fighting game developed by Arc System Works and published by Sony Interactive Entertainment; Features the Hulk as a playable character

== Canceled games ==
Game	Details
The Incredible Hulk Cancellation date: Fall 1983	Proposed system release: Atari 2600
The Incredible Hulk Cancellation date: Fall 1983	Notes: Action game developed by Parker Brothers; The premise centered on Bruce Banner, who would attempt to rescue Betty Ross from bizarre creatures in a tri-level metropolis by using "gamma charges" to become the Hulk.; Featured multiplayer capability; Canceled possibly due to the video game crash of 1983
Marvel Chaos Cancellation date: January 28, 2008	Proposed system release: PlayStation 3, Xbox 360
Marvel Chaos Cancellation date: January 28, 2008	Notes: Fighting game developed by EA Chicago; Featured the Hulk as a playable character; Canceled due to the dissolution of EA Chicago and the termination of the partnership between Electronic Arts and Marvel
The Avengers Cancellation date: August 9, 2011	Proposed system release: Microsoft Windows, PlayStation 3, Xbox 360
The Avengers Cancellation date: August 9, 2011	Notes: First-person brawler game developed by THQ Studio Australia for the PlayStation 3 and Xbox 360 and by Blue Tongue Entertainment for Windows; Based on and planned to release in conjunction with the 2012 film The Avengers; Featured the Hulk as a playable character; Canceled due to THQ's restructuring and realignment plan resulting in the closure of THQ Studio Australia and Blue Tongue Entertainment
