= De Blob 2 =

2011 video game

- Australian Xbox 360 cover art
- Developers: Blue Tongue Entertainment (PlayStation 3, Wii, Xbox 360); Halfbrick Studios (NDS); BlitWorks (PC, PS4, Xbox One, Nintendo Switch)
- Publishers: THQ (Original versions); Syfy Kids (Original versions); THQ Nordic (PC, PS4, Xbox One, Nintendo Switch)
- Director: Nick Hagger
- Designers: Mark Morrison; Christian Canton; Andrew Trevillian; Bryan Duffy
- Programmer: Dan Khoan Chau
- Artists: Terry Lane; Lewis Mitchell; Lynda Mills
- Composer: John Guscott
- Platforms: PlayStation 3, Wii, Xbox 360, Nintendo DS, Windows, PlayStation 4, Xbox One, Nintendo Switch
- Release: PlayStation 3, Wii, Xbox 360, Nintendo DS: NA: 22 February 2011; AU: 24 February 2011; EU: 25 February 2011; Windows: WW: 22 June 2017; PlayStation 4, Xbox One: WW: 27 February 2018; Nintendo Switch: WW: 28 August 2018
- Genres: Platform, puzzle
- Modes: Single-player, multiplayer

De Blob 2 (stylized as de Blob 2) is a platform puzzle video game and the sequel to the Wii 2008 video game De Blob. As with its predecessor, De Blob 2 was developed for home consoles by Blue Tongue Entertainment and published by THQ, this time in association with the TV network Syfy. Unlike de Blob, however, de Blob 2 was also released for other consoles other than the Wii; the game was released for the PlayStation 3, Xbox 360 and the Nintendo DS, with the latter version having been developed by Halfbrick Studios and taking place between de Blob and de Blob 2.

In 2017, THQNordic collaborated with BlitWorks to re-release de Blob 2 (as well as the first de Blob) for then-current generation platforms. Both games were released on June 22, 2017, for Windows and in 2018 for PlayStation 4 and Xbox One on February 27, and August 28 for Nintendo Switch.

== Plot ==
=== Nintendo DS ===
The Nintendo DS version takes place between de Blob and the storyline of the home console versions of de Blob 2. In this version, Dr. Von Blot, Comrade Black's chief scientist, has been experimenting with creatures in order to create a new kind of mutated ink. Blob stumbles across Von Blot's jungle-based underground laboratory and proceeds to stop the doctor's nefarious scheme. After some exploring in the laboratory, Blob stumbles across Von Blot, who accidentally falls into a pool of mutated ink that turns him into "de Blot", a giant monster with Blob-based powers, and he leads an invasion on Chroma City. After defeating the Inkies, Blob is about to be rewarded with the city's key by the mayor, but Blot escapes and Blob, along with the Professor's robot Pinky, goes after him. The two find out that Blot is powering an ink-based rocket to launch on Chroma City to fully turn it into a colorless place and that Blot has kidnapped the Professor. Blob and Pinky reach the pipes that connect the ink to the rocket and turn the ink into color without being noticed by Blot. After that, they save the underground's Raydian crews and the Professor, while Blob faces Blot in a final showdown, where Blot gets defeated and tied to the rocket. The rocket launches, and Blot is killed and defeated, while the Inkies retreat. Blob, Pinky and the Professor celebrate.

=== Other consoles ===
The home console versions of de Blob 2 pick up where the DS version left off, opening with Prisma City's general election. A mysterious priest called Papa Blanc, who is actually a disguised Comrade Black, the villain from the first game, is doing his utmost to rig the outcome of the vote by establishing a violent cult disguised as a peaceful religion and cheating with an artificial metal arm in each voting booth that presses Blanc. When the results are revealed, he unmasks himself on live television and puts in place a military junta headed by 7 marshalls. The INKT Corporation, as before, manages to drain all color from the city and also turns its inhabitants, the Prismans, into generic worker drones referred to as Graydians. Once again, it is up to Blob and the members of the Color Underground to restore the city to its vibrant former glory.

Blob frees the lands one by one, as he did in the last game, fighting against many foes, including a massive monster created in a factory accident, as he approaches Comrade Black. Black, however, is shown to be more clever than was suggested in the previous game. At one point, he kidnaps the other members of the Color Underground, using them as zoo attractions. Once Blob frees all of Prisma City, he confronts Comrade Black again, only to discover, as he flees to space once again, that Black had used Blob's own journey against him, using color beacons that were mysteriously activated as Blob progressed to power an orbiting satellite to hypnotize the entire planet.

As Blob gets closer and closer, Black taunts him and forces him to make a series of choices: continue on, or rescue a few Graydians that Black had placed in biodomes rigged to explode and risk running out of time. Once Blob finally reaches him, Black uses a high-power beam of color to grow gigantic and fight Blob. Once Blob defeats him, Black is sucked into space, and the world returns to normal.

== Gameplay ==
de Blob 2's gameplay is largely similar to its predecessor's. The player once again controls Blob, who can mix colors in order to paint objects and bring life to the cityscape, which in turn opens up previously locked areas. Blob is given missions by his friends in the Color Underground, such as completing timed races, defeating enemies, liberating captured Graydians and seizing important landmarks.

However, new gameplay additions have been added. One example is Blob's new ability to perform a powerful dash attack, which breaks through obstacles and kills most foes, at the expense of a sizable number of paint points. Furthermore, as the player progresses through the game, they obtain "inspiration points", which are used at the Idea Emporium to purchase upgrades for Blob, such as increased paint capacity and defensive shields. Power-ups feature within the levels as well: the magnetic Wrecking Ball allows Blob to roll up metal surfaces, sink underwater, and destroy any enemy easily; the Hazmat Suit protects Blob from any passive hazards such an ink and hotplates; the Graviton Bomb temporarily transforms Blob into a devastating black hole; the Re-Gen constantly replenishes Blob's paint points; and the Rainbow gives Blob infinite paint points and gives him the use of all seven colors at once.

Another new inclusion is a two-player mode akin to the co-op functionality of Super Mario Galaxy. The second player takes control of a new member of the Color Underground named Pinky, who is able to assist Blob and help him surmount more difficult challenges. Bosses also play a larger role in this game; the player has to use the painting mechanics in thoughtful ways in order to defeat them.

Aside from the new gameplay additions, de Blob 2 also has a heavier emphasis on platforming compared to its predecessor. Much like in de Blob, Blob has to take over landmark buildings in the city, but this time he also has to enter them, rather than simply needing a certain number of paint points to capture it. Inside, the gameplay switches from its usual 3D perspective to a 2D perspective. Blob must then complete a platforming challenge filled with many hazards, such as the new Gravity Wall mechanics, before the building is taken. There are over 100 of these platforming stages throughout the course of the game.

In comparison to the home console versions, the Nintendo DS version of de Blob 2 instead plays entirely as a 2D platformer. It is divided into individual levels that require Blob to make use of wall jumping and a slingshot technique to traverse environments, with these features drawing comparisons to the gameplay used in the Sonic the Hedgehog series.

== Development ==
de Blob 2 was announced on 29 May 2010, a couple of weeks before E3 2010. Initially titled as de Blob: The Underground, the game had a demo at the conventions, though only the Wii and Nintendo DS versions were playable. It was later revealed to be coming to Xbox 360 and PlayStation 3, under the new title of de Blob 2. At the same time, Melbourne-based Blue Tongue Entertainment unveiled their new high-definition game engine, Prime, and revealed that the HD editions of de Blob 2 would be the first game to run on this engine. These versions both have stereoscopic 3D graphics, while the PlayStation 3 version supports PlayStation Move as a control option, similarly to how de Blob utilized the Wii's motion controls. Additionally, a partnership between Blue Tongue Entertainment and the television network Syfy was revealed in order to release unannounced de Blob media and products, but this partnership never came to pass due to Blue Tongue's closure in August 2011.

Project director Nick Hagger said that the development team aimed to build upon the prior game, while retaining the best gameplay elements that were praised during its reception. In an interview, Hagger said that they had looked at the criticisms of de Blob and identified that the variety of tasks offered to the player was a key area of improvement to focus on. He also expressed his enthusiasm for the competitive multiplayer mode, which he believed would be more fully featured this time around, although no firm details were given.

John Guscott, the composer of the previous game, returned to score the music for de Blob 2. The soundtrack was released separately in both CD and vinyl form. The PS3 version also features the full soundtrack of the original de Blob on its disc.

== Reception ==
Reception

Aggregate scores
Aggregator	Score
GameRankings	(PS3) 75.13% (Wii) 79.63% (X360) 78.90% (DS) 74.58%
Metacritic	(PS3) 74/100 (Wii) 79/100 (X360) 77/100 (DS) 75/100

Review scores
Publication	Score
1Up.com	C+
Eurogamer	8/10
Game Informer	8/10
GameSpot	(PS3/Wii/X360) 7/10 (DS) 7.5/10
GamesRadar+	3.5/5
IGN	(PS3/Wii/X360) 8/10 (DS) 7.5/10
Nintendo Power	8/10
Nintendo World Report	8.5/10
Official Nintendo Magazine	79%

De Blob 2 received "favorable" reviews on all platforms, according to review aggregator website Metacritic. However de Blob 2 financially performed much more poorly than the original game. On release it sold under 75,000 copies in the US on its first month and failed to reach the Top 40 in the UK.

Similar to de blob, its soundtrack is held in similar high regard.
