= Barking Lizards Technologies =

American video game developer

- Type: Private
- Industry: Video game developer
- Founded: 2001
- Defunct: 2013
- Fate: Closed by staff
- Headquarters: Richardson, Texas
- Key people: Drew Fisher (CEO); Bryan Pritchard (CCO, and president); Sandy Petersen (Creative Director)
- Subsidiaries: Wild Hare Entertainment
- Website: http://www.barkinglizards.com/

Barking Lizards Technologies was an American video game developer that developed for mobile phones, PlayStation 2, Game Boy Advance, Nintendo DS, PlayStation Portable, Wii and personal computer. Founded in 2001, Barking Lizards Technologies was based in Richardson, Texas. Their titles were published through several major video game publishers, namely THQ, and Activision, and have published a title of their own, Osiris Legends for iOS.

Prior to their expansion into game development in 2006, they specialized in providing support and project outsourcing services to existing games companies.

In 2006, Barking Lizards created the subsidiary Wild Hare Entertainment to publish games from external sources. The company focused entirely on PC titles for a short time before shutting down.

== Whiptail ==
Barking Lizards Technologies developed Whiptail, a multiplatform game engine, which they used to develop their video game titles. They developed 3 versions of Whiptail, which are used to handle different platforms, Whiptail 3D, Whiptail Handheld, and Whiptail Mobile.

== Games developed ==
Nintendo DS

- Bratz: Forever Diamondz (2006 — for THQ)
- El Tigre: The Adventures of Manny Rivera (2007 — for THQ)
- Zoey 101: Field Trip Fiasco (2007 — for THQ)
- Bratz 4 Real (2007 — for THQ)
- Super Collapse 3 (2007 - for MumboJumbo)
- Bratz Girlz Really Rock (2008 - for THQ)

Game Boy Advance

- Bratz: Forever Diamondz (2006 — for THQ)
- Marvel: Ultimate Alliance (2006 — for Activision)
- Bratz Babyz (2006 — for THQ)
- Bratz: The Movie (2007 — for THQ)
- Zoey 101 (2007 — for THQ)

Wii

- The Naked Brothers Band (2008 - for THQ)

PlayStation 2

- Activision Anthology (2002 — with Contraband Entertainment — for Activision)
- The Naked Brothers Band (2008 - for THQ)

PC

- Command & Conquer: The First Decade (2006 — for Electronic Arts)
- The Naked Brothers Band (2008 - for THQ)

N-Gage

- X-Men Legends (2005 — for Activision)
- X-Men Legends II: Rise of Apocalypse (2005 — for Activision)

N-Gage 2.0

- Snakes Subsonic (2008 — for Nokia Publishing)

Mobile phones

- The Elder Scrolls IV: Oblivion (2005)
- Cthulhu World Combat (2013) (Cancelled)

PlayStation Portable

- SpongeBob's Truth or Square (2009)
