= Avatar: The Last Airbender (video game) =

2006 video game

- Developers: THQ Studio Australia; Tose (DS, PSP); Halfbrick (GBA)
- Publisher: THQ
- Platforms: Wii, Nintendo DS, GameCube, Game Boy Advance, PlayStation 2, PlayStation Portable, Xbox, Windows
- Release: Windows, PS2, PSP, DS, GBA: NA: October 10, 2006; FR: October 27, 2006; UK: February 9, 2007; GameCube: NA: October 10, 2006; FR/DE: October 27, 2006; Xbox: NA: October 10, 2006; Wii: NA: November 19, 2006; FR: December 22, 2006; UK: February 9, 2007
- Genres: Action-adventure, action role-playing
- Mode: Single-player

Avatar: The Last Airbender (also known as Avatar: The Legend of Aang in Europe) is a 2006 action-adventure video game based on the animated television series of the same name. It was released for the Game Boy Advance, Microsoft Windows, GameCube, Nintendo DS, PlayStation 2, PlayStation Portable, Wii, and Xbox. The game was a launch title for the Wii in North America. All versions feature an original story set between Book 1 and Book 2 of the series, except for the Microsoft Windows version, which features a different story, based on Book 1, and different gameplay.

A sequel, Avatar: The Last Airbender – The Burning Earth, was released in 2007.

== Gameplay ==
The Avatar: The Last Airbender video game allows the player to control one of four characters – Aang, Katara, Haru, or Sokka – in a single-player adventure. Each character uses his/her own trademark weapon and fighting style, and is able to earn new special abilities through experience gained from defeating enemies. A variety of items can help the player with quests, or during battle (armor, chi, enchanted accessories, and healing potions). The game also enables the player to collect certain resources and bring them to artisans to make special items. Enemies include classic Firebenders, machines, and a variety of animals from the show, mainly the first book.

The Wii version varies with regard to the "hot/cold" minigame where the player's controller vibrates to help the player find hidden items. When the player finds the item, in most console versions, the player repeats a rhythm minigame until having a successful round. In the Wii version, there is a calligraphy minigame with the Wiimote instead. In combat, the Wii version requires that the player swings the Wiimote while pressing the button for a special move (in Aang's case, swinging his staff down to unleash a gust of air to knock enemies down), whereas the other versions only require pressing the button while holding the right shoulder button.

== Plot ==
While training at the Northern Water Tribe, Avatar Aang and Katara hear reports of a waterbender, Hiryu, going missing, which they investigate. They arrive at the Water Tribe as a Fire Nation ship attacks, led by Prince Zuko. They are able to fend off the attackers, but Katara is captured during the battle. Aang and Sokka follow the ship, but are slowed by a firebending machine. They follow the ship to an Earth Kingdom port. They slip into the jail and release Katara, who informs them of another prisoner named Lian the Maker, who is being forced to make machines for the Fire Nation. When they arrive at Lian's cell, they find it empty, except for a map to an Earth Kingdom village. They find the village under attack by machines. After fending off the machines, they pick up Haru and are informed that one of his earthbending friends, Yuan, was kidnapped. They travel to the library of Omashu for clues to where the machines might originate from, which leads them to an uncharted island.

On the island, they find Lian, making the machines. She fears that Avatar Aang will not be able to master all four elements before Sozin's comet arrives. Aang refuses her help, seeing as how the machines are disrupting villages. Lian sends a machine to fight them, and they flee to the Air temple, attempting to destroy the Avatar statues. They stop Lian, but Katara, Sokka, and Haru are all captured by another machine. Aang pursues Lian and the machine to a fortress. After Aang rescues his friends, they find Prince Zuko, also captured by a machine. Upon rescuing him, Prince Zuko attacks the group. At the end of the resulting fight, the Fire Nation prince is knocked over a cliff and swept over a waterfall.

The four enter the fortress, where they find Lian, where she finished a machine being operated by the missing waterbender Hiryu, Haru's friend Yuan and a nameless firebender. Lian tries to attach Aang to the machine, but he battles it instead. During the fight, Katara is struck down, causing a furious Aang to enter the powerful Avatar State and destroy the machine once and for all, burying Lian under its rubble, killing her (though she survives in the portable versions of the game).

As the four leave the fortress, Prince Zuko is seen crawling up on the shoreline, grumbling angrily, due to having failed to capture the Avatar.

== Reception ==
Reception

Aggregate score
Aggregator	Score							
Aggregator	DS	GBA	GameCube	PC	PS2	PSP	Wii	Xbox
Metacritic	63%	64%	60%	N/A	59%	57%	56%	63%

Review scores
Publication	Score							
Publication	DS	GBA	GameCube	PC	PS2	PSP	Wii	Xbox
GameSpot	5.7/10	7/10	N/A	N/A	N/A	6.9/10	N/A	5.9/10
GameZone	6.9/10	7.4/10	5.9/10	N/A	5.5/10	6.9/10	6.4/10	6.1/10
IGN	7/10	6/10	5.1/10	5/10	5.1/10	5.1/10	5.1/10	5.1/10
X-Play	N/A	N/A	N/A	N/A	N/A	N/A	2/5	N/A

Despite mixed critical reviews, THQ's Avatar: The Last Airbender performed well commercially, selling over one million units worldwide as of February 2007 and becoming THQ's top-selling Nickelodeon product of 2006. The game even went on to achieve Sony Computer Entertainment's "Greatest Hits" status for the PlayStation 2 on July 19, 2007.
