= Andy Capp: The Game =

1987 video game

- Original Mirrorsoft Cover Art
- Developer: Blitter Animations
- Publishers: NA: Mirrorsoft Ltd.; EU: Mirrorsoft Ltd.
- Designer: Tim McCarthy
- Composer: Jason C. Brooke
- Platforms: Commodore 64, Amstrad CPC, ZX Spectrum
- Release: Commodore 64: NA: 1987; EU: ca. Dec 1987; ZX Spectrum: EU: 1987
- Genre: Adventure
- Mode: Single-player

Andy Capp: The Game is a video game for the Commodore 64, Amstrad CPC, and ZX Spectrum that is all about controlling the main character Andy Capp. The game is based on the comic strip of the same name from the Daily Mirror, the British newspaper published by Mirrorsoft's parent company, Mirror Group Newspapers. Specifically released for Christmas of 1987, Andy Capp: The Game was intended to be a holiday blockbuster in both North America and Europe.

== Gameplay ==
For fighting in the game, players must appear in court and choose whether or not to pay the fine to the judge.

Andy has to acquire money to give to his wife from various sources, as he has already spent his unemployment benefit, while consuming as much alcohol as possible and avoid getting arrested for various crimes (like punching his wife and beating up police officers). Money is assigned to the player in British pounds and kisses are used to control various non-player characters. Running out of kisses or alcohol means that the game instantly ends with a game over. The time is given in the 24-hour clock format (00:00-23:59 and excluding the AM/PM formats) while the days of the weeks are organized from Monday to Friday.

Players can make Andy either speak or fight. A score is given to reward players for making the right decisions.

The music, Antonín Dvořák's New World Symphony, was also used in the iconic 1973 Ridley Scott-directed British television commercial to advertise Hovis bread.

== Reception ==
The game received an enthusiastic review in Computer and Video Games which stated "the graphics are truly excellent, capturing all the characters perfectly". It was also well received by Your Sinclair who found it to be "an excellent arcade adventure. Great fun, simple but effective graphics and tough gameplay. Everything you need really".

== See also ==
- List of video games based on comics
