= Barnyard (video game) =

2006 video game

- North American Windows cover art
- Developers: Blue Tongue Entertainment (PS2, GC, Wii, Windows); Halfbrick (GBA)
- Publisher: THQ
- Director: Nick Hagger
- Producer: Nick Hagger
- Designers: Nick Hagger; Mark Morrison
- Programmer: Dan Khoan Chau
- Artists: Ben Crouch; Lloyd Chidgzey
- Composers: Stephan Schütze; John Guscott
- Platforms: Game Boy Advance, Windows, PlayStation 2, GameCube, Wii
- Release: GBA, PS2, Windows: NA: August 1, 2006; AU: September 14, 2006; EU: October 13, 2006; GameCube: NA: August 1, 2006; PAL: October 13, 2006; Wii: NA: November 30, 2006; AU: December 7, 2006; EU: February 9, 2007; JP: April 5, 2007
- Genres: Party, adventure
- Mode: Single-player

Barnyard is a party-oriented adventure game developed by Blue Tongue Entertainment and published by THQ; it is based on the movie of the same name. It was released on August 1, 2006 for GameCube, PlayStation 2, Game Boy Advance, and Microsoft Windows. A Wii version was released on November 30, 2006.

== Gameplay ==
The game has several types of gameplay, from missions to a mini-game type system. Players play through a sequence of nine chapters as farm animals of their choosing. An extra farm animal may be unlocked by having Nickelodeon games at the time that were included in the 'Crossover' event. As players progress through the chapters in the game, they meet new characters, unlock new areas, get more in-game currency, etc. Players travel around the Barnyard and either explore the area(s) the game has to offer or follow the story and complete the missions by going to the barn animal that sent a text to players' phones. Players may find these characters by looking for and following the quickest path to the '!' on the map. As players continue through the chapters, the game increases in variety. There are many references to the Barnyard as well, including dialogue from the characters and certain in-game objects. As players reach the mid-part of the game, however, they lose the same playable character, Ben, who is lost in the movie. As players reach the end of the game, specifically Chapter 8, things only get worse as the leader of the Barnyard, Otis, runs off, and players are put in charge. However, the tides suddenly turn as the player, the other animals, and Otis take one final stand against the final boss. Note that the number of missions available depends on the chapter being played.

=== Missions ===
Within the game, there is a storyline that fits the movie to some extent but still goes along its own path. Characters die and are introduced as the game progresses, as in the movie. Missions fit the storyline of the game and the movie and vary a lot. A lot of missions, once completed, become minigames that the player can play again. Missions can be started by simply talking to the located characters. Most of the in-game missions are done during the day and must be done by the time the timer runs out, but some of them are nighttime missions that need to be completed by morning (or before the timer runs out).

=== Mini-games ===
Mini-games most often become available after completing missions, but may also become available in the barn. Missions include golf, or jumping and kicking a pipe at other characters to stay alive. Throughout the game, the player may notice that the difficulty of some of the mini-games increases as the story progresses. There are also variations of mini-games from previous chapters. One example being 'Tease The Mailman' and 'Tease Mrs. Beady'. The player could also buy some of the mini-games from the Gopher Underground Shop, as some of them are located in the Night Barn. During gameplay, the player is eventually informed of the 'Barnyard Champion' title throughout. At the end of all the mini-games, the player's performance is graded (Final Score). The grades range from an 'F' to a Star. Getting Stars is the key to getting Barnyard Champion. The player needs to talk to a character mentioned in the game that provides information on the standings for Barnyard Champion. While climbing to the top of the leaderboard, the player receives a Gold Rush Token for every move up. Once the player reaches #1, a special text is received, indicating that the player is now the Barnyard Champion. After the player receives this text and enters the Night Barn, a special cutscene plays.

=== The Barn ===
During the day, the barn is a boring place where the player could acquire some resources for cooking, but at night, the barn becomes a lively place where the player could party, make mocktails, and play minigames. The barn is very customisable through the Gopher Underground Shop, a shop mentioned in an early Chapter 1 mission that is located just outside the main area. Upon reaching this point in the game, the player receives just enough Gopher Bucks for the only item available during the first visit. After this mission, all the other objects become unlocked except for the Neon Dance Floor. The player may then make additional purchases and do missions for the owner of the Gopher Underground Shop.

=== Collections ===
Within the game, there are many forms of objects to collect:

- Secrets: Notes hidden in trees and fences with tips for the game
- Recipe Rocks: Provide recipes for the Kitchen at the back of the barn and the Mocktail bar (only available at night). Recipes can be guessed, but require a lot of resources to do so, as there are many recipes and ingredients.
- Gold Rush Tokens: Can be collected and placed in coin dispensers so that the player can get Gopher Bucks for the Gopher Underground Shop.
- Royal Jelly: A secret object. It can be obtained sometimes by getting every bit of honey out of all three beehives in the Walnut Woods area. Royal Jelly may be obtained if the usual yellow circle displayed on the top of the screen begins flashing red. Even then, the player may not get it because it is such a rare item. It can be eaten or sold at the Gopher Underground Shop.

== Reception ==
Reception

Aggregate score
Aggregator	Score				
Aggregator	GBA	GameCube	PC	PS2	Wii
Metacritic	56/100	66/100	67/100	62/100	65/100

Review scores
Publication	Score				
Publication	GBA	GameCube	PC	PS2	Wii
GameSpot	5.9/10	7.1/10	7.1/10	7.1/10	7.2/10
GamesRadar+	N/A	3/5	3/5	3/5	3/5
GameZone	7.5/10	7.1/10	N/A	7.7/10	N/A
IGN	6/10	6.7/10	N/A	N/A	5.8/10
Nintendo World Report	N/A	7/10	N/A	N/A	N/A

Barnyard received "mixed or average" reviews, according to review aggregator Metacritic. GameSpot gave the PC, GameCube and PlayStation 2 versions a 7.1 out of 10, while they gave the Wii version a 7.2 out of 10 and the Game Boy Advance version a 5.9 out of 10. IGN gave the GameCube and Wii versions a 6.7 out of 10 and a 5.8 out of 10.
