= The Naked Brothers Band (video game) =

2008 video game

- North American PlayStation 2 cover art
- Developers: Barking Lizards Technologies, 1st Playable Productions (DS)
- Publisher: THQ
- Platforms: Microsoft Windows; Nintendo DS; PlayStation 2 Wii
- Release: 2008
- Genres: Rhythm, music
- Modes: Single-player, multiplayer

The Naked Brothers Band is a 2008 multiplatform video game developed by Barking Lizards Technologies for PC, PlayStation 2, and Wii, with 1st Playable Productions developing the DS title, and published by THQ. The game is based on, and includes songs by, The Naked Brothers Band.

The PC version was leaked 3 weeks prior to its release. There are new songs made especially for the game like "Haunted Hotel", "Will You be Mine", and "Caught Cheating" will not have Nat singing.

== Plot summary ==
The band is on their bus. Cooper comes in with news and says that the band will be on a world tour. The band travels to Miami, New York City, and many more venues and plays multiple songs like "Eventually" and "Body I Occupy". The player gets to play as the vocals, drums, cello, guitar, bass guitar, and keyboard as they embark on a tour as they are in the band.

== Characters ==
- Nat
- Alex
- David
- Rosalina
- Qaasim
- Thomas
- Audience

== Reception ==
The Wii version of the game was met with several negative reviews, averaging a press score of 43.33% at GameRankings. The game was criticized for bad presentation, graphics, as well as misspelling of the lyrics in the game. IGN gave this game a 2.0 out of 10.0 for its bad controls. With GameSpot also rating it a 1.5 out of 10 for its lack of good graphics as well as misspelling of lyrics. Also, on the PlayStation 2 version, songs like "I Could Be" and "Three Is Enough" lets the player do vocals as Nat but has Alex singing the lead vocals instead. Also on that version, the song "Eventually" leaves out some words. On the PS2 and Wii versions, the song "Don't Turn Around" doesn't have any lyrics whatsoever.

The Nintendo DS version of the game scored better reviews, scoring a 6.8/10 by GameZone.
