= Marvel Avengers: Battle for Earth =

2012 video game

- Cover art by Leinil Francis Yu
- Developer: Ubisoft Quebec
- Publisher: Ubisoft
- Platforms: Xbox 360; Wii U
- Release: Xbox 360: NA: October 30, 2012; AU: November 8, 2012; EU: November 9, 2012; Wii U: NA: December 4, 2012; EU: January 24, 2013; AU: February 14, 2013
- Genre: Fighting
- Modes: Single-player, multiplayer

Marvel Avengers: Battle for Earth is a video game developed by Ubisoft Quebec and published by Ubisoft for the Xbox 360 and the Wii U. The game is heavily based on the "Secret Invasion" storyline in Marvel comic books. The game was announced after the cancellation of the original The Avengers game based on the 2012 film of the same name, being developed by THQ. Battle for Earth was released in North America on October 30, 2012 for the Xbox 360, followed by the Wii U version on December 4. It was the first and currently only Marvel video game to be published by Ubisoft.

== Plot ==
As narrated by Uatu, in order to save the planet Earth, The Avengers must battle a shape shifting extraterrestrial race known as The Skrulls. The Skrulls begin replacing Earth's heroes with doppelgangers that not only look like the heroes they impersonate, but have their powers. It is up to the remaining Marvel heroes to battle the Skrull impersonators to prevent the invasion of an alien race through an inter-dimensional portal above New York City.

== Gameplay ==
The game was inspired by and features characters from the "Secret Invasion" storyline. Each character has three unique super powers, which can be chained for combos. Motion gameplay is used to unleash super attacks, velocity boosts, breakers and frenzies, using the Wii Remote and Nunchuk or the Wii U GamePad's touch screen in the Wii U version and the Kinect sensor for the Xbox 360 version. The gameplay is in 2.5D, viewed by players from a 3rd person perspective of the controlled character. Alternate costumes and collector cards can be unlocked by players throughout the game.

Avengers: Battle for Earth has four distinct modes of play: Campaign, Versus, Arcade and Challenges. In order to achieve 100% completion in the game, players must complete the campaign, arcade and all challenges. All combat challenges feature four characters, two of which are player controlled and may be swapped at will, with exception of certain stages within the challenges section, designed specifically to limit the characters movement and controls. During play, players are awarded XP depending on performance in matches; XP raises rank, interpreted as an icon next to the players name.

Campaign Mode features five levels broken into eight stages each, for a total of 40 stages. Each stage has predetermined combatants and form a loose narrative. Campaign Mode does not require linear play, with the exception of the requirement of the first four stages of all levels to be completed before the player can access the final four stages of any one level. Campaign Mode can also be played co-op.

Versus Mode allows local two-player combat. Players are first required to select one of the five stages as their arena, then select two characters for their team, and once characters have been chosen, unlocked costumes may be selected.

Arcade Mode allows players to form a team of any two unlocked characters, dressed in any of the available unlocked costumes, in a ten battle progression. After completing the ten stages, Arcade mode is completed. Arcade mode can also be played co-op.

Challenges Mode is broken down into three sections: Training, Characters, and Trials:

Training features limited scenarios to familiarize players with controls.

Characters familiarizes players with the available moves of each individual character, provided they have been unlocked and are accessible for normal gameplay.

Trials are scenarios with specific parameters or handicaps that the player must overcome to succeed. There is a total of twenty scenarios, but only twelve are initially available. The additional eight must be unlocked through the Uplay account rewards.

=== Wii U-specific gameplay ===
Wii U gameplay is performed on the Wii U GamePad or Wii Remote with Nunchuk controller. Play on the Gamepad requires players to trace patterns on the gamepad screen to perform special attacks. Wii Remote gameplay performs attacks by controller motion movement.

Campaign mode: Viewing the action on the television requires a Wii Remote for play, or a Wii Remote to access to the camera in the option menu displayed on the television. Gameplay for gamepad users is displayed on the Gamepad screen.

Versus mode: Vs. mode requires the use of one or more Wii remotes with Nunchuk. Other controller options are unavailable. If both players choose to use Wii remotes, the action is displayed on the television in split screen mode.

== Characters ==
The Avengers: Battle for Earth features different heroes and villains from the Marvel Universe, each with three unique super power moves. Each character also has unlockable costumes. All characters appear as their Skrull counterpart during the campaign mode.

== Development and marketing ==
A video game with the same name as The Avengers film was planned for concurrent release. The game was to be a first-person shooter/brawler for the Xbox 360, PS3, and Microsoft Windows and published by THQ, with THQ Studio Australia developing of the console versions and Blue Tongue Entertainment the PC version. After THQ closed both studios, the game was cancelled. Intellectual property rights for an Avengers video game reverted to Marvel, which said it was exploring potential publishing and licensing opportunities. Later in May 2012, Ubisoft teamed up with Marvel Entertainment to develop Marvel Avengers: Battle for Earth for the Wii U and Xbox 360. Tony Key, US senior vice president of sales and marketing at Ubisoft stated that "we are excited to team up with Marvel Entertainment to bring some of the most iconic comic book characters from the Marvel line-up to life in motion-gaming".

Xbox 360 format and gameplay is very similar to the earlier released game PowerUp Heroes, also by Ubisoft, released the previous year, in 2011, although Marvel Avengers: Battle for Earth has expanded gameplay and improved gesture recognition.

== Reception ==
Reception

Aggregate score
Aggregator	Score	
Aggregator	Wii U	Xbox 360
Metacritic	50/100	62/100

Review scores
Publication	Score	
Publication	Wii U	Xbox 360
4Players	N/A	55%
Electronic Gaming Monthly	N/A	7/10
GamesTM	6/10	N/A
Hardcore Gamer	N/A	3.5/5
IGN	5/10	N/A
Jeuxvideo.com	13/20	13/20
Nintendo Life	5/10	N/A
Nintendo World Report	4/10	N/A
Official Nintendo Magazine	45%	N/A
Official Xbox Magazine (US)	N/A	7/10
The Globe and Mail	N/A	6/10
Metro	4/10	4/10

The game received "mixed" reviews on both platforms according to the review aggregation website Metacritic. Official Xbox Magazine wrote: "Though the game mostly works as advertised, occasional missed moves and finicky menus disappoint. So do the bare-bones campaign and limited array of fighting venues"; and EGMNow said: "As usual, the gimmicks quickly become evident and tiresome, especially for folks familiar with the comic arc this game's story is based on. However, there is some surprising polish here and you might have more fun with it than you'd expect as it is one of the few Kinect games where the controls actually work."

The Globe and Mail gave the Xbox 360 version six out of ten, saying that the game "will tire you out, but it just can't quite trick us into believing the Black Widow could really kick Thor's butt, which is too bad because that smarmy Goldilocks usually has it coming." Common Sense Media gave the game three stars out of five, saying, "Marvel Avengers: Battle for Earth does get a bit tiring after a while (compared to a button-based controller), but it is a fresh way to tackle a fighting game that also gets you up and moving." Metro gave both console versions each a score of four out of ten, calling the Xbox 360 version "One of the least worst Kinect games this year, which although it suffers from all the usual control issues is at least mindless fun while it lasts"; and later saying that "The Wii U version has slightly less control issues than the original Kinect game, but also less of the novelty – although it's still mindless comic book fun while it lasts."
