= El Tigre: The Adventures of Manny Rivera (video game) =

2007 video game

- Developers: Barking Lizards (DS); Blue Tongue (PS2)
- Publisher: THQ
- Director: Robert Blackadder
- Designer: Phil Anderson
- Programmers: Alister Hatt; Paul Baker
- Artist: Julian Lamont
- Composer: Mick Gordon (Note: Additional music by Andrew Curnock)
- Platforms: Nintendo DS; PlayStation 2
- Release: NA: October 29, 2007; EU: March 28, 2008
- Genre: Action game
- Mode: Single-player

El Tigre: The Adventures of Manny Rivera is a video game based on the Nickelodeon television series of the same name, published by THQ and released on October 29, 2007. The Nintendo DS version was developed by Barking Lizards Technologies. The PlayStation 2 version was developed by Blue Tongue Entertainment. The PS2 game acts as a simple platformer over four levels and two bonus stages, the objective of the game being to collect "macho points". A Wii version was planned, but it was cancelled due to budget cuts and a short development cycle due to the show getting cancelled early.
