= The Last Airbender (video game) =

2010 video game

- North American Wii box art
- Developers: THQ Studio Australia (Wii); Halfbrick Studios (DS)
- Publisher: THQ
- Composer: Mick Gordon
- Platforms: Wii, Nintendo DS
- Release: NA: June 29, 2010; EU: August 6, 2010; AU: September 9, 2010
- Genres: Platforming, Action-adventure
- Modes: Single-player, multiplayer

The Last Airbender is a video game based on the film of the same name (in-turn based on Avatar: The Last Airbender Book One: Water) for the Wii and Nintendo DS. It was released on June 29, 2010 in North America, in Europe on August 6, 2010, and in Australia on September 9, 2010. Like the previous Avatar: The Last Airbender games, it was developed by THQ Studio Australia and published by THQ. It received mixed reviews, with many critics calling it an improvement over the movie.

== Gameplay ==
Players get to play as Aang, Prince Zuko, and the Blue Spirit (an alter-ego of Zuko). Players play as Aang who uses airbending, play as Prince Zuko who uses firebending, and play as the Blue Spirit who uses stealth moves and sword attacks.

== Reception ==
Reception

Aggregate score
Aggregator	Score	
Aggregator	DS	Wii
GameRankings	70%	51%

The game received mixed reviews. Video game talk show Good Game: Spawn Point's presenters gave the Wii version a score of 4.5 and 4 out of 10. They criticized the absence of being able to block attacks, believing such a feature would have been easy to include. They also pointed out that the levels felt repetitive. The Avatar State was also perceived as annoying due to requiring players to repeat the sequence every time a mistake was made. The character's controls were also criticized for being too sensitive which led to unfair deaths. The Blue Spirit was specifically criticized for his difficulty to turn around when in stealth mode. While the co-op arena mode was enjoyed by Good Game: Spawn Point due to its simplicity, they felt disappointed with the lack of co-op in story mode.

Reviews for the game were generally much more positive than those of the film.
