= List of video games based on tabletop games =

This is a list of licensed video games based on tabletop role-playing games and miniature wargames.

== Battlecars ==
Video game based on the Battlecars wargame:

- Battlecars (1984)

== BattleTech ==
For video games based on BattleTech and games in the MechWarrior series, see List of BattleTech games#Video games.

== Buck Rogers XXVC ==
Video games based on the Buck Rogers XXVC RPG:

- Buck Rogers: Countdown to Doomsday (1990)
- Buck Rogers: Matrix Cubed (1992)

== Champions ==
MMORPG based on Champions RPG:

- Champions Online (2009)

== Cyberpunk ==
Action RPG based on the Cyberpunk 2020 RPG:

- Cyberpunk 2077 (2020)

== The Dark Eye ==
For video games based on the German RPG The Dark Eye, see The Dark Eye#Video games.

== Dungeons & Dragons ==
For video games based on Dungeons & Dragons, see List of Dungeons & Dragons video games.

== GURPS ==
Video games based on GURPS:

- Fallout (1997) used the GURPS system for most of its development until a creative difference prompted a switch to a modified "SPECIAL" system

== Heavy Gear ==
Video games based on Heavy Gear:

- Heavy Gear (1997)
- Heavy Gear II (1999)

== Numenera ==
Video game based on the Numenera RPG:

- Torment: Tides of Numenera (2017)

== Ogre ==
Video games based on the Ogre wargame:

- Ogre (1986)
- Ogre (2017)

== Pathfinder ==
Video games based on the Pathfinder Roleplaying Game:

- Pathfinder Adventures (2016)
- Pathfinder: Kingmaker (2018)
- Pathfinder: Wrath of the Righteous (2021)
- Pathfinder: Gallowspire Survivors (2023)

== Rifts ==
Video game based on the Rifts RPG:

- Rifts: Promise of Power (2005)

== RuneQuest ==
Video game based on the RuneQuest RPG:

- King of Dragon Pass (1999) is set in Glorantha, a world invented for the wargame White Bear and Red Moon and also used in the roleplaying game RuneQuest

== Shadowrun ==
For video games based on Shadowrun, see Shadowrun#Video games.

== Skyrealms of Jorune ==
Video game based on the RPG Skyrealms of Jorune:

- Alien Logic: A Skyrealms of Jorune Adventure (1994)

== Space: 1889 ==
Video game based on the Space: 1889 RPG:

- Space: 1889 (1990)

== Star Wars ==
Video game based on the Star Wars Roleplaying Game:

- Star Wars: Knights of the Old Republic (2003) and its sequel The Sith Lords (2004)

== Traveller ==
Video games based on the Traveller RPG:

- MegaTraveller 1: The Zhodani Conspiracy (1990)
- MegaTraveller 2: Quest for the Ancients (1991)

== Tunnels & Trolls ==
Video game based on the Tunnels & Trolls RPG:

- Tunnels & Trolls: Crusaders of Khazan (1990)

== Twilight 2000 ==
Video game based on the Twilight 2000 RPG:

- Twilight 2000 (1991)

== Warhammer ==
For video games based on Warhammer Fantasy and Warhammer 40,000, see List of Games Workshop video games.

== World of Darkness ==
For video games based on the World of Darkness, see List of World of Darkness video games.
