= De Blob =

2008 puzzle-platform game

- North American Wii version cover art
- Developers: Universomo (iOS); Blue Tongue Entertainment (Wii); BlitWorks (PC, PS4, Xbox One, Switch)
- Publishers: THQ Wireless (iOS); THQ (Wii); THQ Nordic (PC, PS4, Xbox One, Switch)
- Director: Nick Hagger
- Designers: Mark Morrison; Christian Canton; Andrew Trevillian
- Programmer: Dan Khoan Chau
- Artists: Terry Lane; Lewis Mitchell; Lynda Mills
- Composer: John Guscott
- Series: de Blob
- Platforms: iOS, Wii, Windows, PlayStation 4, Xbox One, Nintendo Switch
- Release: iOS: WW: 8 July 2008; Wii: NA: 22 September 2008; AU: 25 September 2008; EU: 26 September 2008; Windows: WW: 27 April 2017; PlayStation 4, Xbox One: WW: 14 November 2017; Nintendo Switch: WW: 26 June 2018
- Genre: Puzzle-platform
- Modes: Single-player, multiplayer

de Blob is a puzzle-platform game developed by Blue Tongue Entertainment and published by THQ for the Wii. Playing as Blob, the player explores and liberates the fictional Chroma City from the evil INKT Corporation.

The game was originally scheduled for a February 2008 release, but was delayed and then released on 22 September for the Wii. An iOS version of the game, developed by Universomo, ended up releasing earlier on 8 July the same year. A version for the Nintendo DS was being developed by Helixe, but it was ultimately canceled.

De Blob was released for Windows on 27 April 2017, ported by BlitWorks. Ports of the game for PlayStation 4 and Xbox One came later on November 14 of the same year. A Nintendo Switch port was released on 26 June 2018.

== Gameplay ==
de Blob is a 3D Platformer where the player controls Blob. Blob starts out each level with 10 Paint Points (out of a maximum of 100). Blob's paint points are increased by collecting paint from Paintbots scattered throughout the environment. Paintbots are found in red, blue, and yellow; Blob can mix those colours to turn green, purple, orange, or brown. Touching water causes Blob lose his current colour.

Blob is shown in yellow, spreading color throughout the level as a Raydian watches. The time left in the level is shown in the top left. The player's current score and the required score to progress to the next gate are shown in the top right.

The game is organized into 10 levels. Each level is divided into sections by gates, which require a certain number of points to progress. The player can earn points in many ways, including by painting blocks of buildings, freeing Graydians, and completing missions given by members of the Colour Underground. These missions include painting buildings a certain colour, following certain paths through the level, or destroying INKT facilities with Paint Points. Each level also has a time limit, which can be lengthened by collecting timers throughout the level. The goal is to reach the exit pool before time runs out.

Levels start out colourless and drab, with most of the environment being white or grey. Blob can touch various elements in the level, such as buildings, trees, lampposts, and walls, to paint them his current colour. As the level is coloured in, the soundtrack adapts. Levels also feature enemies from the INKT Corporation, who must be defeated by slamming them with Paint Points. In addition to enemies, there are various hazards that must be avoided, including hot plates and ink. If Blob touches ink, he steadily loses Paint Points and must touch water to wash it off before his Paint Points reach 0. Objects touched while Blob is filled with ink will lose their colour.

== Plot ==
Told through a combination of pre-rendered cinematic sequences and in-game dialog, de Blob tells the story of Chroma City, its invasion by the INKT Corporation and its subsequent liberation by the titular Blob and the Colour Underground.

Chroma City, once a lively and colorful place filled with its equally vibrant and diverse citizens known as the Raydians, is suddenly invaded by the INKT Corporation. This alien corporate military dictatorship, led by the villainous Comrade Black, is committed to eradicating color through its "War on Colour." As a result, Chroma City quickly falls to the invading army of Inkies and color-draining Leechbots, transforming its landscape into a barren, colorless wasteland. The citizens are captured and transformed into "Graydians," imprisoned in uniform gray suits that are marked only by a barcode on the back of each one. The Graydians are forced to endure menial labor and serve as a resource for ink, which is extracted from their sadness.

Blob witnesses the takeover of Chroma City from his jungle retreat and takes action. He begins by rescuing the only remaining pocket of resistance, known as the Colour Underground. Joining the group, Blob follows their orders and begins reclaiming sections of the city, inciting the furious wrath of Comrade Black. In retaliation, Black launches everything from propaganda campaigns to the creation of super soldiers in an attempt to stop Blob, but all efforts prove ineffective.

With nearly the entire city of Chroma liberated by Blob and the Colour Underground, Comrade Black desperately orders his troops to retreat to his spaceship in Lake Raydia. He plans to launch all the stolen color into a black hole, where it would be lost forever. However, Blob manages to stow away on the spaceship, defeats Black, and detonates a device that consumes the spacecraft in a burst of color and whimsy as he escapes on a Hoverboard. With the Raydians finally safe, Blob returns to his jungle retreat, napping on a tree just as he did at the beginning of the story.

In a post-credit scene, it is revealed that Comrade Black survived the destruction of his spaceship and is now trapped on a tiny island inhabited by cute and colorful creatures, much to his dismay.

== Development ==
de Blob was originally developed as a downloadable game for Windows by eight students of Game Design & Development at the Utrecht School of the Arts and one student studying Game and Media Technology at Utrecht University, in the Netherlands. At the time of conception, sections of Utrecht were being rebuilt and the principal task in creating the game was to convey how the railroad station area of Utrecht would look in 10 years. It was primarily intended for short-duration play, keeping people entertained for at least a few minutes at a booth while learning about the city's plans for the station. The city of Utrecht adopted Blob, de Blob's protagonist, as its mascot.

Two versions of the game were released as freeware in late June 2006 through the Utrecht School of the Arts website. There was a Dutch version, called "De Blob", and an English version, called "The Blob" ("de" is the Dutch cognate of "the"). It was created using the OGRE graphics engine, the FMOD audio engine, and the Open Dynamics Engine for physics and collision detection. The developers also stated that they had used 3D Studio MAX for modeling-level designs, Adobe Photoshop for textures, and Reason and Sound Forge for audio. While the freeware version was referred to by its English name internationally, the Dutch name was adopted by THQ as its official title. It was further stylized without a capital letter to become "de Blob".

THQ acquired the rights to the game, then handed over the game to Blue Tongue Entertainment and Helixe, with both companies developing their versions for different consoles.

The game had a marketing budget of $3 million.

Five members of the original team later formed Ronimo Games.

== Reception ==
Reception

Aggregate scores
Aggregator	Score
GameRankings	81.12% (45 reviews)
Metacritic	82/100 (48 reviews)

Review scores
Publication	Score
1Up.com	B
Edge	8/10
Eurogamer	8/10
Game Informer	7.75/10
GamePro	3.5/5
GameSpot	8/10
GameTrailers	8.3/10
IGN	8.4/10
Nintendo Power	8/10
Nintendo World Report	9/10
Official Nintendo Magazine	92%

de Blob received positive reviews overall. IGN called it "one of the best third-party efforts to come over to Wii in a long time". Nintendo Power said: "Admittedly, there's not a ton of variety...but it remains fun throughout". Nintendo World Report claimed "de Blob is defined by its pure unadulterated fun", rating it a 9/10. Eurogamer described de Blob as "excellent and thoroughly original". Edge rated de Blob an 8/10, calling it "a game for meandering in, for absorbing and messing around with". GameSpot rated the Wii version an 8/10. Official Nintendo Magazine awarded the game both a rating of 92% and its Gold Award, stating that "de Blob is an absolutely flippin' awesome videogame". N-Europe said that De Blob was "the most colourful and ambitiously fresh" title on the Wii.

It won or was nominated for several Wii-specific awards from IGN in its 2008 video game awards, including Best Platform Game, Best Graphics Technology, and Best Use of Sound. It was nominated for several other Wii-specific awards by IGN, including Best New IP, Best Original Score, Most Innovative Design, and Game of the Year. During the 12th Annual Interactive Achievement Awards, the Academy of Interactive Arts & Sciences nominated de Blob for "Outstanding Achievement in Original Music Composition".

de Blob sold more than 230,000 copies by December 2008 in the United States. THQ stated they have shipped more than 700,000 copies of the game, and have sold more than 700,000 copies worldwide. THQ CEO Brian Farrell believed the success of the game was related to its "Nintendo-esque" style. THQ responded to these sales by telling IGN to tell their readers to expect more de Blob in the future.

The Nintendo Switch version was nominated for "Game, Classic Revival" at the 2019 National Academy of Video Game Trade Reviewers Awards.

== Sequel ==
During THQ's fiscal third quarter conference call, president and CEO Brian Farrell announced both de Blob and Saints Row would see new titles in the coming years. Farrell said that "our de Blob franchise will be back again in fiscal 2011. We successfully launched this highly-rated franchise in fiscal 2009 to broad, critical acclaim".
