= The Avengers (video game) =

Cancelled 2012 video game

- Developers: THQ Studio Australia; Blue Tongue Entertainment
- Publisher: THQ
- Platforms: PlayStation 3, Xbox 360, Wii U, Microsoft Windows
- Release: Cancelled
- Genres: First-person shooter, beat 'em up
- Modes: Single-player, multiplayer

The Avengers was a cancelled first-person brawler video game set to be released in 2012, to coincide with the release of the Marvel Cinematic Universe (MCU) film of the same name. The game was not tied or based around the film, but rather an original story, inspired by the "Secret Invasion" storyline in the comics.

== Gameplay ==
Gameplay was to be co-op, between four players offline and online, with teamwork being an essential mechanic. Each of the playable characters, such as Iron Man, Captain America, the Hulk, and Thor, would have a unique play style. Iron Man being able to fly while the Hulk had the strongest melee attacks. Assist attacks allowed players to stun enemies, leaving them open to be finished off by other players, such as Thor summoning lightning with Captain America finishing off the opponent using his shield. Players could also earn experience points from performing a series of melee attack combos on stunned enemies, which would go on to unlock additional abilities. "Hero boosts" used by the player could increase stats of other players depending on the character, such as Iron Man creating energy shields around allies for a limited time. Other characters, such as Black Widow, Hawkeye, War Machine, Ms. Marvel, the Fantastic Four, and Ant-Man, were also considered to be unlockable characters or included as NPCs.

The Skrull army were to have unique abilities based on a variety of superheroes such as the Fantastic Four, X-Men and the Avengers, with bosses such as Veranke and a giant Super-Skrull.

== Development and cancellation ==
In 2010, THQ acquired the rights from Marvel with development handled by THQ Studio Australia with outsourced development handled by Blue Tongue Entertainment to create a video game based on several characters from the Avengers. The game chosen to be in first-person came from the developers wanting to try something different from previous games based on Marvel's properties, wanting the player to see through the eyes of characters such as Captain America, Hulk, Thor and Iron Man. The story was to be an original one borrowing elements from the "Secret Invasion" story in the comics with Brian Michael Bendis, who wrote the arc, brought in to script the game's story.

PlayStation 3 and Xbox 360 were the main consoles of development with Blue Tongue Entertainment handling the PC port. Plans for a Wii U was also considered around the system's launch and console features such as the Kinect for a mode called "Avengers Training Academy" which would have the player take control of a rookie superhero to fight along The Avengers using motion controls, but both were later cut during pre-production.

During mid 2011, the game was struggling to keep up with development with THQ's financial problems with Homefront and the uDraw peripheral costing the company $100 million and the value of the Australian dollar to rise, causing THQ to pay their employees in Australia more than their domestic divisions which led to the decision to shut down both THQ Studio Australia and Blue Tongue Entertainment. In the last few weeks of the developers being shut down, they reached out to Marvel Entertainment in hopes to continue funding and developing the title, which Marvel refused to, making the game officially cancelled.

After the game's cancellation, THQ sold off their properties, with Ubisoft acquiring the license to make their own tie-in game to the film, borrowing some of the game's concepts and story to create Marvel Avengers: Battle for Earth for Xbox 360 and Wii U, released on October 20, 2012.

In September 2026, The Avengers was discovered among a list of games whose Steam achievements had been leaked, suggesting that it may be back in development.
