= Collapse! =

1998 video game

- Genre: Puzzle
- Developer: GameHouse
- Publisher: GameHouse (RealNetworks)
- Platforms: Windows, Mac OS X
- First release: Collapse! 1998
- Latest release: Collapse! Blast; March 11, 2013

Collapse! is a series of tile-matching video games by Seattle-based GameHouse. In 2007, Super Collapse! 3 became the first game to win the Game of the Year at the inaugural Zeebys. The series has been discontinued since 2015 due to RealNetworks shutting down its internal games studio.

In 2006, a spin-off series called Super Collapse Puzzle Gallery! was developed into 5 games.

== Gameplay ==
The classic Collapse! game is played on a board of twelve columns by fifteen rows. Randomly colored blocks fill the board, rising from below. By clicking on a group of 3 or more blocks of the same color, the whole group disappears in a collapse and any blocks stacked above fall down to fill in the vacant spaces. If a whole column is cleared, the elements slide to the center of the field. If one or more blocks rise beyond the top row of the board, the game is lost. If the player manages to survive a specified number of lines without losing, they win the level and are awarded points for successful completion.

A level usually begins with a few rows of blocks using a starting set of colors (typically red, green, blue, white, and yellow). One after the other, new blocks are added to a "feed" row below the board. When the feeder row has filled, all of its blocks are moved up, to the active board, shifting the field of remaining blocks higher. During the course of a level, the rate of new blocks entering the feed increases. New colors may also be introduced, making it more challenging for the player to find groups that are large enough to be collapsed.

In higher levels of the game, "bombs" appear, mixed among the blocks. The bombs are black (in which case clicking on them causes the surrounding blocks to disappear), or are the color of one of the groups of bricks (in which case clicking on the bomb eliminates all bricks on the board that are the same color). Black bombs have the additional quality of serving as a bridge between bricks of the same color; if two or more bricks of the same color are touching a bomb, then clicking one of those bricks has the same effect of clicking on a group of three or more bricks of the same color. In Super Collapse 3!, this rule is changed to allow colored bombs to act as a bridge between matching groups. On higher levels, grey blocks with an "X" on it appear. They cannot be clicked even if they form a group of three, and therefore can only be removed by bombs.

When a player completes a certain number of "even-numbered" levels (i.e., from level 2, 4, 8, 10, 14 and 16), a bonus level is played. Here, the player has 15 seconds to completely clear a screenful of bricks and earn extra points.

== Games ==
| Title | Date | Platforms |
|---|---|---|
| Collapse! | 1998 | Web (Flash) |
| Super Collapse! | 2001 | Win 95/98/ME/2K/XP |
| Super Collapse! II | 2002 | Win XP/2K, Mac OS X, Game Boy Advance |
| SpongeBob SquarePants Collapse! | 2004 | Win XP/2K, Mac OS X; Web (Flash) |
| Collapse! Crunch | 2005 | Win XP/2K, Mac OS X |
| Super Collapse! 3 | 2006 | Win XP/2K, Mac OS X; PlayStation Portable, Nintendo DS |
| Super Collapse! Puzzle Gallery | 2007 | Win XP/2K, Mac OS X |
| Collapse! Chaos | 2008 | Mobile, iPhone/iPod Touch |
| Collapse! | 2009 | Win XP/2K/Vista/7, Mac OS X; Web (Flash); iPhone/Touch, Android, Mobile |
| Collapse! | 2011 | Windows Phone 7 |
| Collapse! Blast | 2013 | iPhone/Touch/Android/Facebook |

=== Web & Super Collapse! ===
Super Collapse!
- Developer: GameHouse
- Publisher: GameHouse
- Designers: Ben Exworthy; Garr Godfrey (orig.)
- Series: Collapse!
- Platforms: Windows; Mac OS X; Browser (Flash); Game Boy Advance; Nintendo DS; PlayStation Portable; Mobile; iPhone; Smartphone; Facebook; Windows Phone 7
- Release: 1999
- Genre: Puzzle
- Mode: Single-player

In late 1998, Ben Exworthy and Garr Godfrey worked together to release the original Collapse! as a browser-based game.

In 2001, GameHouse developed and released Super Collapse!, a standalone download for Microsoft Windows. This new version adds enhanced graphical resolution, animations, sounds and music. Afterwards, GameHouse continued to use the word "super" in the titles of its download games, to distinguish them from the web-based versions.

=== Super Collapse! II ===
In 2002, one year after the release of Super Collapse!, GameHouse would create the first true sequel in the series, Super Collapse! II. In addition to the classic gameplay, Super Collapse II would offer Relapse, Strategy, and Puzzle modes.

=== Super Collapse! 3 ===
Super Collapse! 3 continued expanding the work of previous Collapse! games. In addition to three new modes (Slider, Continuous, Countdown), Super Collapse! 3 introduced a "quest" mode where players progressed through a whimsical world, unlocking new levels as they go. Sound effects and music for Collapse! 3 were created and composed by Jesse Holt.

In 2006, it received a Zeeby award and was named the Best Casual Game of the Year.

=== Collapse! (2009) ===
COLLAPSE! promotional screen art

In late 2009, GameHouse released all new versions of the game dubbed COLLAPSE! across several platforms including Windows, Mac, Facebook, and mobile. While each version is uniquely designed for each major platform, players can earn special codes to unlock bonuses in the PC, Mac, and Facebook versions.

==== Facebook app ====
The first of these new games was a Facebook application, released in October. Players compete with friends in weekly tournaments, with a new game variation unlocked each day. During any given week, players can play and replay any previous day's challenge (for example, to maximize a score) but, at the end of the week, the scores are locked, combined into weekly totals, and winners declared.

==== iPhone and mobile ====
In December 2009, the iPhone and iPod Touch version of COLLAPSE! was released to the iTunes Store. Like Super Collapse 3, this version featured a quest mode where the player would advance through a world, unlocking new levels. Unlike Collapse 3, this version introduced player and enemy characters as well as a name for its fictional world: "Blocktopia".

According to RealNetworks, this new mobile game used a proprietary development platform, Emerge, and is capable of being ported to eight mobile operating systems, 130 cell phone carriers and distributors. A version for Android as well as BlackBerry and other devices was released a few weeks later.

==== Windows and Mac ====
Released in December 2009, the PC and Mac version of COLLAPSE! continued to evolve the game in the direction set out by Super Collapse 3.

The "Quest" mode from Super Collapse 3 has been renamed "Adventure" in COLLAPSE! and updated to feature not only a more detailed world ("Blocktopia") but also a story and a customizable avatar to take through it. Each land within Blocktopia is plagued with a unique catastrophe that must be repaired one level at a time. At the end of each land, players battle against a comic boss who uses special powers and techniques to vary the gameplay and challenge the player.

Completing levels rewards players with coins that can be used to purchase power-ups, avatar clothing, and additional game features in shops located throughout the world. There are also casinos where players can play games of chance to win even more coins if they run into difficulty.

While much of the classic gameplay is unchanged, one significant variation is the addition of double boards. These modes place a second game board alongside the first and players must switch attention between the two.
