= Garfield Kart =

2013 video game

- Developer: Artefacts Studio
- Publisher: Anuman Interactive
- Platforms: Macintosh, Windows, Nintendo 3DS, iOS, Android
- Release: November 13, 2013
- Genre: Racing
- Mode: Single-player

Garfield Kart is a 2013 kart racing game published by Anuman Interactive and developed by Artefacts Studio. The game is based on the television series The Garfield Show, which itself is based on the American comic strip Garfield. Garfield creator Jim Davis was executive producer. The game was released for Microsoft Windows, Macintosh, Nintendo 3DS, iOS, and Android.

== Gameplay ==
Garfield Kart is a kart racing game similar to the Mario Kart series. The player can compete on various tracks, collect items, and power-ups which interfere with the other racers. Players can also customize their vehicles and play online, though the online feature is only available on Windows and is currently in beta. Garfield and Jon are the only playable characters available at first, while Odie, Liz, Arlene, Nermal, Harry, and Squeak can be unlocked. There are daily challenges the player can complete, which will give them options to customize their vehicle.

There are three cups to choose from: Lasagna, Pizza, and Hamburger. There is also the hidden Ice Cream Cup, which is unlocked by completing all the other cups on 150cc difficulty. Each cup contains 4 maps, for 16 in total. There are also three difficulties to choose from: 50cc, 100cc, and 150cc. The Lasagna Cup is always free, and the Pizza Cup is free for 50cc, but for the 100cc and 150cc the player has to unlock the cups, or can pay to try them using in-game coins.

== Reception ==
Garfield Kart was met with mostly negative reception from critics due to what they called unimaginative gameplay, low production value, and poorly designed mechanics. The game was met with more positive, though mostly humorous, user reviews on Steam.

In its review, Nintendo Life gave Garfield Kart a score of 3/10 while describing it as "a bland, horribly un-balanced Kart game". Hardcore Gamer gave Garfield Kart a rating of 1.5/5, criticizing the game as "absolutely dreadful".

== Remake and sequel ==
On July 30, 2019, it was reported that Garfield Kart would be getting a remake titled Garfield Kart: Furious Racing. The game was released on November 7, 2019, for Windows and Macintosh (Steam), and on November 19, 2019, for Nintendo Switch, PlayStation 4, and Xbox One.

In June 2025, Microids announced a sequel, titled Garfield Kart 2 – All You Can Drift. Developed by Eden Games, All You Can Drift was released on September 10, 2025, for Nintendo Switch, PlayStation 5, Xbox Series X/S, and Windows.
