= Fantastic Four (1997 video game) =

- North American box art
- Developer: Probe Entertainment
- Publisher: Acclaim Entertainment
- Producers: Robert O'Farrell, Tony Beckwith (exec.)
- Designer: Nick Baynes
- Programmers: Balor Knight; Stefan Hopper
- Artists: Steve Middleton; Paul Phippen; Matt Tracey
- Composers: Stephen Root; Neil Palmer
- Platform: PlayStation
- Release: EU: August 1997; NA: October 1997
- Genre: Beat 'em up

Fantastic Four is a 1997 beat 'em up game developed by Probe Entertainment and published by Acclaim Entertainment for the PlayStation. Based on the Marvel Comics superhero team of the same name, the gameplay sees players beating up various enemies in side-scroling stages similarly to Final Fight.

== Gameplay ==
The format of the game is similar to arcade games such as Final Fight and Acclaim's own Batman Forever: The Arcade Game. Up to four players (with a PlayStation Multitap) can control Mr. Fantastic, Invisible Woman, the Thing, Human Torch or She-Hulk through various side-scrolling levels. Groups of thugs, robots, and mutants will appear on each screen and need to be destroyed before the player can advance. Every character has various short-range fighting moves: punching, kicking, jumping, and tossing enemies or objects. In addition, each character has at least four special moves unique to that character. Using blocks or certain special moves drains the character's "Force Power".

Some enemies will leave behind icons that give the player an extra life, or restore their health or Force Power. At the end of each level, there is a supervillain to defeat: Mole Man, Super-Skrull, Attuma, Sub-Mariner, Psycho-Man, or Doctor Doom. After the defeat of the boss, without the loss of any player life, there is one of three bonus rounds. The fights here are set against Dragon Man, the Incredible Hulk, or Iceman. During the loading time between each level, the player is able to play a mini-car racing game.

The player can switch between any of the superheroes not already being played at any time. Some of the bosses speak briefly before they fight or are defeated; this is affected by the choice of player character.

== Plot ==
Doctor Doom has developed a device that transports the Fantastic Four to various locations to do battle with various monsters and supervillains. Mr. Fantastic assembles a time machine that allows him to transport the team to Doom's tiny kingdom for a final battle. While Galactus does not appear in the game, it is clear that he is behind the destruction of the Skrull homeworld.

== Development ==
According to Greg Fischbach, chairman and CEO of publisher Acclaim Entertainment, Acclaim realized during development that Fantastic Four was not turning out well, but contractual obligations forced them to continue with developing and publishing it.

A Sega Saturn version of the game was announced, but Acclaim cancelled it in early 1997.

== Reception ==
Reception

Aggregate score
Aggregator	Score
GameRankings	37%

Review scores
Publication	Score
Consoles +	85%
Computer and Video Games	1/5
Famitsu	16/40
GameSpot	4.3/10
IGN	1/10
Jeuxvideo.com	16/20
Joypad	67%
Next Generation	1/5
Official U.S. PlayStation Magazine	2/5

Fantastic Four received overwhelmingly negative reviews. Both IGN and Next Generation criticized the poor control and rough sprites, and GameSpot and Next Generation both found the music completely failed to fit in with the game. Next Generation said, "Like the worst of Acclaim's licensed games for the last eight years, this one takes a venerable piece of pop-culture property, in this case Stan Lee's Fantastic 4, and reduces it to dismal side-scrolling action – using 'action' in the loosest sense of the word." In Japan, where the game was ported and published by Acclaim Japan on February 19, 1998, Famitsu gave it a score of 16 out of 40.

GamePro's brief review criticized that "the character animation is stiff, the sound effects are campy, and the gameplay quickly becomes repetitive as waves of enemies attack in predictable patterns." (Note: GamePro gave the game 3/5 for graphics, two 2/5 scores for sound and overall fun factor, and 2.5/5 for control.) IGN ventured that it "could very well be the worst game ever made." GameSpot had a more mixed reaction, arguing that Fantastic Four has some interesting features, such as its multiplayer capabilities, and that if the core game had been worked on so that it wasn't so boring and easy, it would have been a much better game.

Though they never reviewed the game, Electronic Gaming Monthly named Fantastic Four Worst Use of a Good License in their 1998 Video Game Buyer's Guide, commenting, "Aside from its somewhat-decent polygonal graphics, Fantastic Four is nothing more than dull, repetitive Final Fight rehash."
