= Blue Tongue Entertainment =

Australian video game developer

Blue Tongue Entertainment Pty, Ltd.
- Type: Subsidiary
- Industry: Video games
- Founded: 13 October 1995; 31 years ago
- Founders: Chris Mosely; Andrew Heath
- Defunct: 10 August 2011
- Headquarters: Melbourne, Australia
- Key people: Kevin Chan (general manager)
- Products: de Blob series; Nicktoons series
- Parent: THQ (2004–2011)

Blue Tongue Entertainment Pty, Ltd. was an Australian video game developer founded in 1995. It was acquired by THQ on 17 November 2004, and remained an internal development studio of THQ until its closure in August 2011. In addition to THQ, Blue Tongue had worked with the publishers Hasbro Interactive and Vivendi Universal Games.

Blue Tongue originally provided web development services, and moved into video games in 1995 with their first release, AFL Finals Fever. It was released on 9 June 1996 and reached number 3 on the Australian software sales charts. Another game, Riding Star, was their first international release. It was ported to multiple platforms, including the PlayStation and the Game Boy. Blue Tongue developed the TOSHI game engine used internally for many of its projects.

In 2008, Blue Tongue finished de Blob, its first original game since Riding Star, for the Wii system. de Blob was met with critical acclaim from various gaming websites, including Official Nintendo Magazine, which awarded the game a rating of 92% and a Gold Award, and IGN.com, which awarded the game several Wii-specific awards in its 2008 video game awards, including Best Platform Game, Best Graphics Technology, and Best Use of Sound. In addition to the awards won, IGN also nominated de Blob for several other Wii-specific awards, including Best New IP, Best Original Score, Most Innovative Design, and Game of the Year.

In 2011, Blue Tongue was announced to be closed down under a restructuring and realignment plan by parent company, THQ.

== Games ==
Year	Title	Platform(s)
1996	AFL Finals Fever	Microsoft Windows
1998	Riding Star	Microsoft Windows
2000	Starship Troopers: Terran Ascendancy	Microsoft Windows
2003	Jurassic Park: Operation Genesis	Microsoft Windows, PlayStation 2, Xbox
2004	The Polar Express	GameCube, Microsoft Windows, PlayStation 2
2005	Nicktoons Unite!	GameCube, PlayStation 2
2006	Barnyard	GameCube, Microsoft Windows, PlayStation 2, Wii
2006	Nicktoons: Battle for Volcano Island	GameCube, PlayStation 2
2007	Nicktoons: Attack of the Toybots	PlayStation 2, Wii
2007	El Tigre: The Adventures of Manny Rivera	PlayStation 2
2008	De Blob	Wii
2009	Marvel Super Hero Squad	Wii
2011	De Blob 2	PlayStation 3, Wii, Xbox 360

=== Cancelled ===
- The Avengers
- WWE Brawl

== See also ==
- Fellow Traveller Games
