= The Incredible Hulk (1994 video game) =

- Cover art by Glenn Fabry
- Developer: Probe Software
- Publisher: U.S. Gold
- Producers: Terry Haynes; Gary Liddon (GG, MS)
- Designer: Nick Baynes
- Programmers: Dave Collins (MD); Keith Burkhill (GG, MS); Dan Phillips (SNES)
- Artists: Eric Bailey; Anthony Rosbottom (GG, MS)
- Writers: Julian Rignall; Richard Leadbetter
- Composers: Matt Furniss (MD, GG, MS); Steve Collett (SNES)
- Platforms: Mega Drive; Master System; Game Gear; SNES
- Release: Mega Drive, Game Gear, Master System: EU: July 22, 1994; NA: July 1994; SNES: EU: September 1994; NA: October 1994
- Genres: Action, beat 'em up
- Mode: Single-player

The Incredible Hulk is a 1994 video game released for the Mega Drive, Master System, Game Gear, and SNES. Developed by Probe Software and published by U.S. Gold, the game is based on the Marvel Comics superhero Hulk and showcases him within the context of a side-scrolling action game with platforming and beat 'em up elements. The narrative involves the Hulk attempting to thwart the world domination bid of his nemesis, the Leader, while engaging in combat with other arch-rivals.

The gameplay incorporates a number of fighting moves for the Hulk to execute, and includes moments where his human alter-ego, Bruce Banner, must emerge to access areas that the Hulk is too large to reach. The scenario was created by two journalists from the magazine Mean Machines, and development took place over the course of 18 months. The game received mixed reviews upon release, with critics praising the visuals, music, and variety of moves while criticizing the controls and lack of enemy variety.

== Gameplay ==
An example of gameplay from the SNES version of The Incredible Hulk.

The Incredible Hulk is a side-scrolling action game with platforming and beat 'em up elements. The player controls the Hulk, who is tasked with searching for the Leader while defeating his troops. The Hulk is capable of a variety of offensive techniques, and has four states of being that influence the moves at his disposal: "Hulk", "Super-Hulk", "Hulk-Out", and his human alter-ego Bruce Banner. The Hulk's state is determined by his amount of "Gamma", which doubles as his health. The Hulk begins the game in Super-Hulk mode; sustaining enemy attacks reduces his Gamma, and he will be reduced to a regular Hulk mode if his Gamma drops below 40%. Falling below 5% Gamma will transform the Hulk into Banner, whose only means of offense is a gun with two shots, and who cannot sustain any enemy attacks without dying.

The game is divided into five levels, in which containers holding "Gamma capsules" are scattered throughout. Gamma capsules are divided between normal and "Mega" types; normal capsules raise the Hulk's Gamma level to a maximum of 70% or restore Banner to Hulk status, while Mega capsules enable the Hulk to achieve the Hulk-Out mode, in which he is more powerful and destructive. Hidden within the levels are special "Transformation" capsules that allow the Hulk to transform into Banner without losing Gamma, enabling Banner to explore smaller areas that the Hulk is too large to access. At the end of each level is a boss encounter, which the player is given a limited amount of time to complete; the Abomination also appears as a mini-boss at key points in each level. The time limit can be increased by collecting "time coins", which grant an additional ten seconds each. Other collectibles include extra lives, often found in rooms only accessible to Banner or via Hulk-Out mode, as well as three hidden "continue coins". The game's difficulty can be adjusted in the options menu to "Easy", "Medium", or "Arcade".

== Plot ==
The Hulk's nemesis, the Leader, begins a bid for world domination. He constructs a fortress base in a savage forest, manufactures a vast battalion of robots to march against the nations, and genetically engineers mutants to patrol and protect his fortress. Taking the Hulk's brute strength into account, he further enlists the aid of four of the Hulk's arch-rivals: Rhino, Absorbing Man, Abomination, and Tyrannus.

The Hulk clears the Leader's troops out of the city and defeats Rhino in a construction site. In his search for solitude in a remote forest glade, he falls into Tyrannus's underground labyrinth. After defeating Tyrannus, the Hulk infiltrates the Leader's fortress, where he encounters and defeats Absorbing Man. The Hulk confronts the Leader, who teleports him to the lair's interior, where his mutant soldiers are being produced. After destroying the lair's bio-mechanical "brain", the Hulk breaks through the lair's inner sanctum and confronts the Leader once more.

The game's ending is determined by the difficulty setting. The Easy ending has the Leader scoffing at the Hulk's power, further angering him. In the Normal ending, the Leader triggers the fortress's self-destruct sequence and leaves his hideout in an escape pod. The Hulk escapes before the fortress explodes. In the Arcade ending, the Leader attempts to escape, but the Hulk retaliates by throwing a chunk of rubble at the Leader's escape pod and sending it crashing down, and he stands triumphantly before the Leader's ruined fortress.

== Development and release ==
In the summer of 1992, Mean Machines writers Richard Leadbetter and Julian Rignall were invited by U.S. Gold to create the scenario for a Hulk-based video game. Leadbetter and Rignall agreed upon the general premise of "trashing tanks, doing mile-long jumps and generally indulging in all-out warfare with all and sundry". However, Marvel Comics objected to the prospect of killing humanoid characters, which influenced the final game's robotic enemies. Development was initiated by Probe Software in December 1992. The levels were designed by Nick Baynes, and the graphics were created by Eric Bailey, with Anthony Rosbottom providing additional graphics for the Game Gear version. Matt Furniss composed the music for the Sega versions, which was adapted to the SNES version by Steve Collett.

The game was unveiled at the Summer 1993 Consumer Electronics Show – by which time it was only five percent complete – and was originally slated for a Christmas release. The release date was later moved to February 1994. The game's development ultimately spanned the course of 18 months. The Sega versions were released in Europe on July 22, 1994, and in North America the same month. The SNES version was released in Europe in September 1994 and in North America the following month. The game's instruction manual includes a short introductory comic titled "Revenge of the Leader" that was written by Christian Cooper, penciled by Scott Benefiel, inked by Jason Rodriguez, and lettered by Jon Babcock. The cover art was illustrated by Glenn Fabry.

== Reception ==
Reception

Review scores
Publication	Score
AllGame	(SNES): 3/5 (SMD): 2.5/5
Computer and Video Games	SMD: 52%
Electronic Gaming Monthly	SMD: 7/10, 5/10, 5/10, 5/10 (GG): 7/10, 6/10, 6/10, 7/10, 8/10
Game Players	SMD: 50%
GameFan	SNES: 230/300
GamePro	SMD: 16.5/20; GG: 15/20; SNES: 14.5/20
Mean Machines Sega	SMD: 66%
Mega	SMD: 82%

The Incredible Hulk received mixed reviews from critics. The variety of fighting moves was appreciated, though the controls were considered slow and imprecise, with Captain Squideo of GamePro and Jeff Lundrigan of Game Players citing a difficulty in timing jumps. Computer and Video Games derided the combat as tedious, stating that "if the Hulk could kill opponents without too much trouble, this could have been good". Skid, K. Lee, and Takahara Yagi of Diehard GameFan, as well as Andy Dyer of Mega, commended the hidden rooms and switches, which they said contributed to balanced gameplay and the length and challenge of the levels, though Yagi opined that some extra play mechanics and special effects would have made the game great rather than good. Scary Larry of GamePro, on the other hand, considered the level design to be somewhat repetitive, and observed that the game could be finished in an evening. Nintendo Power likewise criticized the lack of challenge, but complimented the accessibility. The reviewers for Electronic Gaming Monthly complained of unavoidable enemy attacks, which Danyon Carpenter observed was exacerbated by the lack of defensive techniques. The variety of enemies was said to be lacking, though Captain Squideo considered the bosses to be imaginative. Lundrigan and the Enquirer of Diehard GameFan felt the game was unoriginal and without any of the special features found in more recent titles. Skid noted that the SNES version had no extra features and ran slightly slower compared to the Mega Drive version.

Steve Merrett of Mean Machines Sega criticized the game's deviations from the source material's characterizations, such as the Hulk requiring several hits to destroy something and Banner requiring and seeking capsules to transform in spite of his search for a cure. He dismissed the game as "yet another dull platformer with crap beat 'em up bits thrown in for good measure" that was no better than Data East's Dragon Ninja. Angus Swan of the same publication was disappointed that the game turned out to be "a complete non-event" following its prolonged development, declaring it to be a "pathetic, production-line platform beat 'em up", and negatively comparing it to Sunsoft's Superman game, concluding that "console programmers have an unerring ability to make superheroes into super dorks".

The graphics were widely praised for their well-drawn and colourful sprites and animation, with Captain Squideo singling out the Hulk's climbing animation as particularly impressive. However, Merrett, Swan, and Lundrigan felt that the sprite size was insufficient, The backgrounds were dismissed as bland and uninspired. Critics enjoyed the music, which was described as "jazzy", "swingbeat", "1970's funk", and "hip hop", though Yagi warned that it "does start to grind on you after a long level". Computer and Video Games criticized the Mega Drive version's "fuzzy and hissy" audio as outdated, and Captain Squideo dismissed the Game Gear version's audio as weak, remarking that "Hulk's hits land with little sonic force".

In the United States, the game was its sixth-highest selling Mega Drive title at Babbage's in its debut month, and stayed within the chart at number 7 the following month. It was also the ninth-highest selling Game Gear title in the same debut month, peaking at number 5 the following month. In its SNES debut, the game was the tenth-highest selling title on the platform. In August 1994, the Mega Drive version was the eighth-highest renting title of its platform at Blockbuster Video. It was the ninth-highest renting SNES title at Blockbuster Video in its debut month, and peaked at number 6 the following month.

Mega placed the game at number 39 in their Top 50 Greatest Mega Drive Games of All Time, commending its graphics, animation, and storyline. In 1995, Total! ranked the game 93rd on their Top 100 SNES Games writing: "A not too shabby look at everyone’s favorite green bloke. A bit flawed but fairly smart".
