= THQ Studio Australia =

Australian video game developer

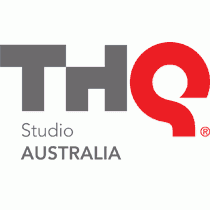
- Type: Subsidiary
- Industry: Video games
- Founded: 2003; 23 years ago
- Defunct: August 2011; 15 years ago
- Headquarters: Brisbane, Queensland, Australia
- Number of employees: 200
- Parent: THQ
- Website: http://www.thqstudioaustralia.com/

THQ Studio Australia was one of the subsidiaries of electronic game publisher THQ. Based in Brisbane, Australia, the studio have developed titles for the sixth and seventh generation of games consoles and managed (via internal producers) the development of handheld versions of their games utilizing smaller local and interstate development studios.

== History ==
THQ Studio Australia was founded in 2003 and concentrated on developing titles based on popular Nickelodeon TV licenses. Releasing a new title yearly between 2004 and 2008 before expanding into multiple teams and developing movie tie-in games such as The Last Airbender based on M. Night Shyamalan's 2010 film of the same name and their last developed game release of DreamWorks Animation's Megamind film.

In August 2011, THQ Studio Australia was announced to be closed down as part of a restructuring and realignment plan by parent company, THQ.

== Games developed ==
Year	Title	Platform(s)
2004	The Adventures of Jimmy Neutron Boy Genius: Attack of the Twonkies	GameCube, PlayStation 2
2005	SpongeBob SquarePants: Lights, Camera, Pants!	GameCube, PlayStation 2, Xbox
2006	Avatar: The Last Airbender	GameCube, PlayStation 2, Xbox, Wii
2007	Avatar: The Burning Earth	PlayStation 2, Xbox 360, Wii
2008	Avatar: Into the Inferno	PlayStation 2, Wii
2010	The Last Airbender	Wii
2010	Megamind: Ultimate Showdown	Xbox 360, PlayStation 3
2010	Megamind: Mega Team Unite	Wii
Cancelled	The Avengers	PlayStation 3, Wii, Xbox 360
