= Billy Dee Williams filmography =

Cataloging of performances by the American actor

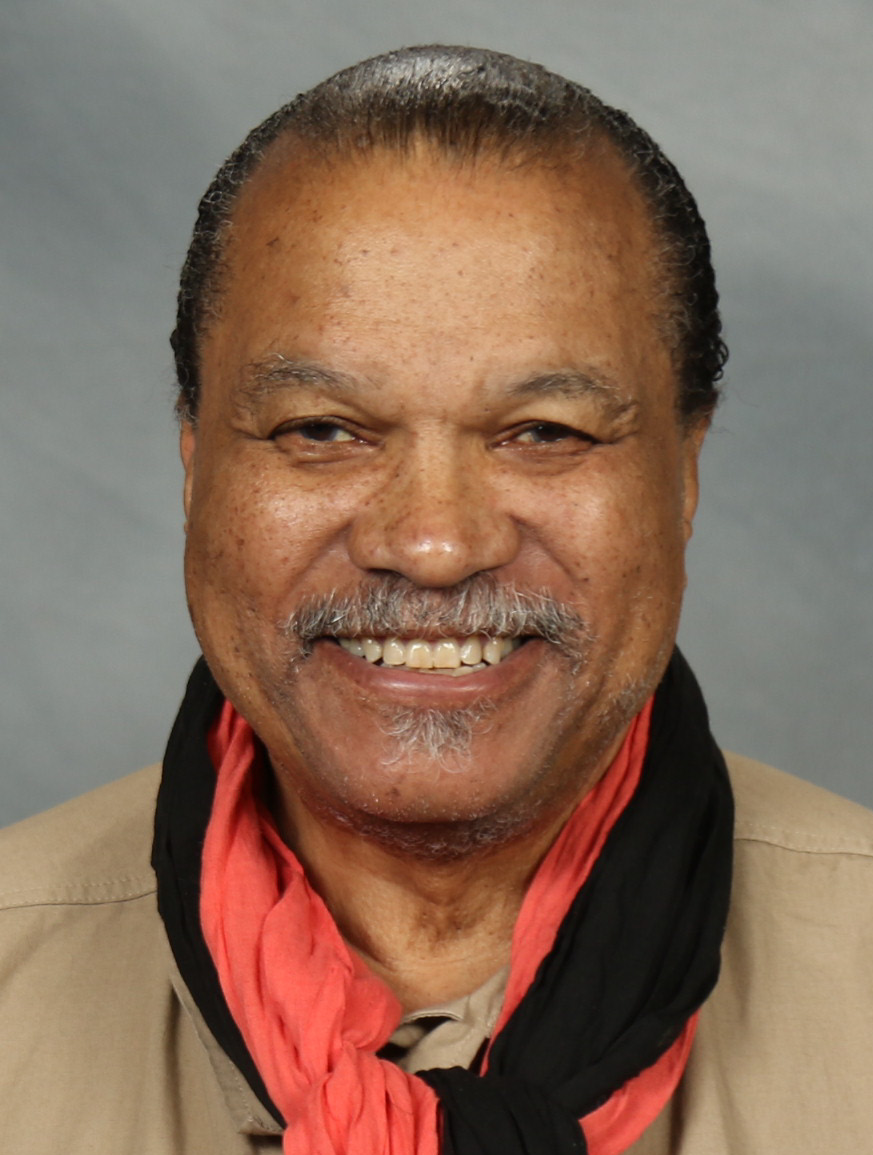
Williams in 2016

This is the filmography for American actor Billy Dee Williams. He has appeared in over 100 films and television roles over six decades. He is most known for portraying Lando Calrissian in the Star Wars franchise and has also appeared in critically acclaimed and popular titles such as Lady Sings the Blues (1972), Mahogany (1975), Scott Joplin (1977), and Nighthawks (1981), as Harvey Dent in Batman (1989) and The Lego Batman Movie (2017), The Last Angry Man (1959), Carter's Army, The Out-of-Towners (1969), The Final Comedown and Lady Sings the Blues (both 1972), Hit! (1973), Fear City and Terror in the Aisles (both 1984), Alien Intruder (1993) and The Visit (2000).

== Film ==
Year	Title	Role	Notes
1959	The Last Angry Man	Josh Quincy	
1969	Lost Flight	Merle Barnaby	TV pilot with later theatrical release
1970	The Out-of-Towners	Clifford Robinson	
1972	The Final Comedown	Johnny Johnson	
1972	Lady Sings the Blues	Louis McKay	
1973	Hit!	Nick Allen	
1974	The Conversation	Man in Yellow Hat	Uncredited
1974	The Take	Sneed	
1975	Mahogany	Brian Walker	
1976	The Bingo Long Traveling All-Stars & Motor Kings	Bingo Long	
1980	The Empire Strikes Back	Lando Calrissian	
1981	Nighthawks	Sergeant Matthew Fox	
1983	Marvin & Tige	Richard Davis	
1983	Return of the Jedi	Lando Calrissian	
1984	Fear City	Al Wheeler	
1984	Terror in the Aisles	Sergeant Matthew Fox	
1987	Number One with a Bullet	Detective Hazeltine	
1987	Deadly Illusion	Hamberger	
1989	Batman	Harvey Dent	
1990	Secret Agent OO Soul	Secret Agent Zero	
1991	Trabbi Goes to Hollywood	Max	
1992	Giant Steps	Slate Thompson	
1993	Alien Intruder	Commander Skyler	Video
1996	The Prince	Jamie Hicks	
1996	Mask of Death	Agent Jeffries	
1997	Steel Sharks	Admiral Jim Perry	
1997	Moving Target	Detective Don Racine	
1998	The Contract	Senator Harmon	
1998	Woo	Himself	
1999	Fear Runs Silent	Sheriff Hammond	Video
2000	The Visit	Henry	
2000	The Ladies Man	Lester	
2001	Good Neighbor	Sergeant Paul Davidson	
2002	The Last Place on Earth	Dr. Davis	
2002	Undercover Brother	General Warren Boutwell	
2004	The Maintenance Man	Melven	Video
2005	Constellation	Helms Boxer	
2006	Hood of Horror	Pastor Charlie	
2008	iMurders	Robert Delgado	
2009	Fanboys	Judge Reinhold	
2009	The Perfect Age of Rock 'n' Roll	Ace Millstone	
2010	Barry Munday	Lonnie Green	
2012	This Bitter Earth	Joe Watkins	
2013	Blondie: The Florence Ballard Story	Rev. C.L. Franklin	
2014	Bloodlines	Judge Devi	
2014	The Lego Movie	Lando Calrissian	Voice
2015	The Man in 3B	Cain	
2017	The Lego Batman Movie	Harvey Dent/Two-Face	Voice
2019	Star Wars: Galaxy's Edge – Adventure Awaits	Narrator	Documentary special
2019	Star Wars: The Rise of Skywalker	Lando Calrissian	
2022	In Search of Tomorrow	Himself	Documentary

== Television ==
Year	Title	Role	Notes
1966	Guiding Light	Dr. Jim Frazier	
1969	The F.B.I.	Nate Phelps	Epidode "The Sanctuary"
1970	Carter's Army	Pvt. Lewis	TV movie
1970	The F.B.I.	Jimmy	Episode "The Architect"
1971	Mission: Impossible	Hank Benton	Episode: "The Miracle"
1971	Brian's Song	Gale Sayers	TV movie
1972	The Glass House	Lennox	TV movie
1977	Scott Joplin	Scott Joplin	TV movie with later theatrical release
1978	The Jeffersons	Himself	Episode: "Me and Billy Dee"
1979	Christmas Lilies of the Field	Homer Smith	TV movie
1980	The Hostage Tower	Clarence Whitlock	TV movie
1980	Children of Divorce	Walter Williams	TV movie
1983	Sesame Street	Himself	3 episodes
1983	Motown 25: Yesterday, Today, Forever	Himself	
1983	Shooting Stars	Douglas Hawk	TV movie
1983	Chiefs	Tyler Watts (aka Joshua Cole)	TV miniseries 3 episodes
1984	Time Bomb	Wes Tanner	TV movie
1984	The Imposter	Matthew Raines	TV movie
1984–85	Dynasty	Brady Lloyd	5 episodes
1985	Double Dare	Billy Diamond	
1986	Blood, Sweat and Tears		Unsold pilot
1986	The Right of the People	Mike Trainor	TV movie
1986	Oceans of Fire	Jim McKinley	TV movie
1986	Courage	Bobby Jay	TV movie
1987	Diana Ross: Red Hot Rhythm & Blues	Himself	
1988	The Return of Desperado	Daniel Lancaster	TV movie
1990	Dangerous Passion	Lou	TV movie
1990	Wiseguy	Jesse Hains	Episode: "Changing Houses"
1992	In Living Color	Himself	
1992	The Jacksons: An American Dream	Berry Gordy	TV movie
1993	Marked for Murder	Captain Jack Reilly	TV movie
1993	A Different World	Langston Paige	Episode: "College Kid"
1993	Martin	Himself	
1993	Percy & Thunder	Ralph Tate	TV movie
1993	Message from Nam	Felix	TV movie
1994	Heaven & Hell: North & South, Book III	Francis Cardozo	TV miniseries 3 episodes
1994	Lonesome Dove: The Series	Aaron Grayson	3 episodes
1995	Triplecross	Oscar	TV movie
1995	Falling for You	Lieutenant Frank	TV movie
1997	The Fourth King	Gasparre	TV movie
1998	Hard Time	Leo Barker	TV movie
1998	18 Wheels of Justice	Burton Hardesty	
1999–2001	The Hughleys	Jerry Rose	2 episodes: "Roots: Part 2" & "Forty Acres and a Fool"
2000–2001	Epoch: Evolution	Ferguson	
2004	That 70s Show	Pastor Dan	Episode: "Baby Don't You Do It"
2004	Half & Half	Otis 'Omar Funk' Wright	Episode: "The Big Fetish What You Started Episode"
2006	Scrubs	Himself	Episode: "Her Story II"
2007	General Hospital: Night Shift	Toussaint DuBois	27 episodes
2007	Lost	Himself	Episode: "Exposé"
2007–2014	Robot Chicken	Lando Calrissian and various other voices	4 episodes
2008	Mind of Mencia		
2008	Private Practice	Henry	Episode: "Serving Two Masters"
2008	Bring Back... Star Wars	Himself	
2009	General Hospital	Toussaint DuBois	5 episodes
2009	Titan Maximum	Admiral Bitchface	5 episodes
2010	Jimmy Kimmel Live: Game Night	Himself	
2010	The Boondocks	Himself (voice)	Episode 10
2011	White Collar	Ford / Bradford Toman	
2011	The Cleveland Show	Lando Calrissian (voice)	
2012	The Life & Times of Tim	Himself (voice)	1 episode
2012	Mad	Lando Calrissian (voice)	Episode: "Potions 11/Moves Like Jabba"
2012–2014	NCIS	Leroy Jethro Moore	2 episodes
2012	Key & Peele	Himself	1 episode
2013	Modern Family	Himself	Episode: "New Year's Eve"
2013	Lego Star Wars: The Yoda Chronicles	Lindo Calrissian (voice)	2 episodes
2014	Dancing with the Stars	Himself	Season 18
2014	Glee	Andy Collins	Episode: "Old Dog, New Tricks"
2015	Star Wars Rebels	Lando Calrissian (voice)	2 episodes
2015	Lego Star Wars: Droid Tales	Lando Calrissian (voice)	3 episodes
2016	Lego Star Wars: The Resistance Rises	Lando Calrissian (voice)	Episode: ""Hunting for Han"
2016–2017	Lego Star Wars: The Freemaker Adventures	Lando Calrissian (voice)	2 episodes
2017	Dirty Dancing	Tito	ABC TV movie
2020	Lego Star Wars Holiday Special	Lando Calrissian (voice)	TV special
2021	Scooby-Doo and Guess Who?	Himself (voice)	Episode: "Scooby-Doo and the Sky Town Cool School!"
2022	Lego Star Wars: Summer Vacation	Lando Calrissian (voice)	TV special
2023	And Just Like That	Lawrence Todd	Episode: "Alive!"
2024–2025	Lego Star Wars: Rebuild the Galaxy	Landolorian (voice)	3 episodes

== Short films ==
Year	Title	Role	Notes
2001	Very Heavy Love		
2004	Oedipus		voice role
2017	Batman Is Just Not That Into You	Harvey Dent/Two-Face	voice role; released with The Lego Batman Movie's home video releases.
2017	Movie Sound Effects: How Do They Do That?	Harvey Dent/Two-Face	voice role

== Video games ==
Year	Title	Role	Notes
2002	Star Wars Jedi Knight II: Jedi Outcast	Lando Calrissian	
2004	Star Wars: Battlefront	Lando Calrissian	Archive footage
2007	Command & Conquer 3: Tiberium Wars	GDI Director Redmond Boyle	Full-motion video (live-action) cutscenes
2009	Star Wars Battlefront: Elite Squadron	Lando Calrissian	Possibly archive footage
2016	Star Wars Battlefront	Lando Calrissian	Cloud City DLC
2016	Lego Star Wars: The Force Awakens	Lando Calrissian	Archive footage
2016	Let It Die	Colonel Jackson	
2017	Star Wars Battlefront II	Lando Calrissian	
2022	Lego Star Wars: The Skywalker Saga	Lando Calrissian	

== Others ==
Year	Title	Role	Notes
1983	The Empire Strikes Back	Lando Calrissian	Audio drama
1994	Star Wars: Dark Empire	Lando Calrissian	Audio drama
2019	Star Tours: The Adventures Continue	Lando Calrissian	Simulator ride theme park attraction
