= Deal =

A deal, or deals may refer to:

== Places ==
=== United States ===
- Deal, New Jersey, a borough
- Deal, Pennsylvania, an unincorporated community
- Deal Lake, New Jersey

=== Other countries ===
- Deal, Kent, a town in England
- Deal Island (Tasmania), Australia
- Deal, a village in Câlnic Commune, Alba County, Romania

== Arts and entertainment ==
- Deal, the distribution of cards in a card game to the players

=== Film and television ===
- Deal (1978 film), a documentary about the TV show Let's Make a Deal distributed by SFM Entertainment
- Deal (2008 film), about poker

=== Music ===
- "Deal" (Tom T. Hall song), by Tom T. Hall
- "Deal", a song from Jerry Garcia's 1972 album Garcia
- "Deal", a song by Man Overboard from Heavy Love
- DEAL$, a band fronted by Angela Seo

== Brands and enterprises ==
- Deal (automobile), built in Jonesville, Michigan, US, from 1905 to 1911
- Deals, a defunct American dollar store chain

== Science and technology ==
- Deal (unit), a unit of volume used to measure wood
- DEAL (Data Encryption Algorithm with Larger blocks), in cryptography
- deal.II, an open source library to solve partial differential equations

== Other uses ==
- Battle of Deal, fought in the English town of Deal in 1495
- Royal Marine Depot, Deal, Kent, England
- Deal (surname)
- Deal, a type of cheap wood, usually from fir (red deal) or pine trees

== See also ==
- The Deal (disambiguation)
- Deel (disambiguation)
- Dele (disambiguation)
- Bargain (disambiguation)
