= Economic history of Turkey =

The economic history of the modern Republic of Turkey has four eras. The first era's development policy was defined by the transition from an agricultural imperial Ottoman economy into a diversified more industrialized economy. It emphasized on private accumulation between 1923 and 1929. The second era's focus was state accumulation in a period of global crises between 1929 and 1945. The third era focused on state-guided industrialization based on import-substituting protectionism between 1950 and 1980. The final era was the opening of the economy to liberal trade in goods, services, and financial market transactions since 1981.

Since 2018 the Turkish economy has been in a state of crisis. The Middle East institute has raised the possibility that Turkey is currently in a new economic era under President Recep Tayyip Erdoğan. This era is defined by reduced institutional financial independence, negative foreign exchange deficits, and political interference.

== Late Ottoman economy ==
The economy of the late Ottoman Empire was characterised by international trade and commerce, silk and textile weaving, agriculture, dairy farming and pastoralism. The Empire's economy began to stagnate in the 18th century, after it lost important territories in Europe. Tthe Empire had also lost its monopoly in spice and silk trade between Asia and Europe, as a result of the discovery of new maritime routes which increasingly replaced the Ottoman-controlled land routes. Several other factors also led to the relative economic obsolescence of the late Ottoman Empire, such as its failure to immediately adapt to the innovative methods in industrial production that were introduced with the First Industrial Revolution in the 18th and 19th centuries, though improvements in industrial production took place with the Tanzimat reforms.

The National Economy (Millî İktisat) program implemented by the Committee of Union and Progress — which involved the expropriation of Christian property and the elimination of Christians from the economy — exerted a major and enduring influence on the political economy of the Republic of Turkey.

== Post-Ottoman reconstruction and liberal beginnings rationale (1923–1929) ==
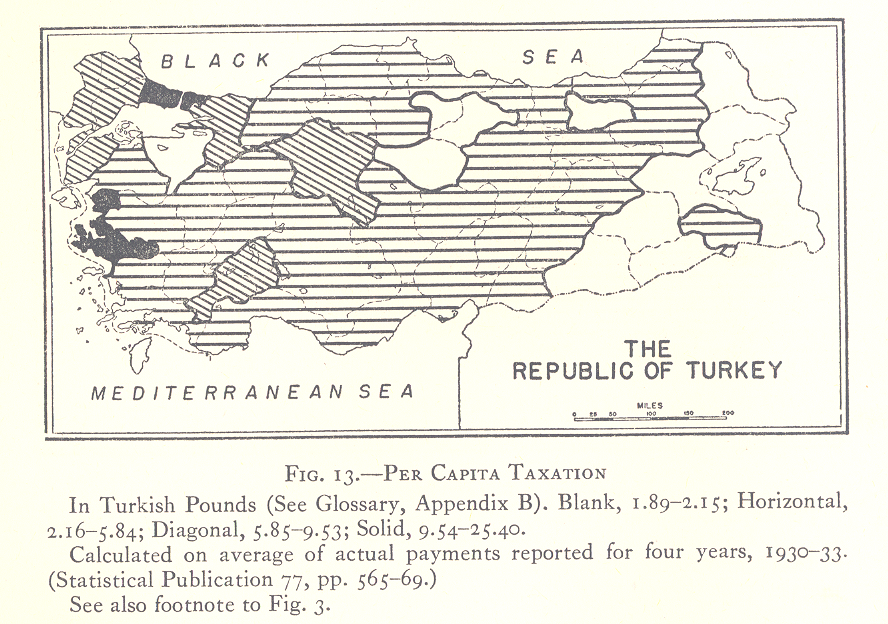
Under Atatürk the economy advanced from state based policies to a mixed economy in line with the increase in capital in the society

One distinct characteristic between 1923 and 1985 is that, in large part as a result of government policies, Turkey's economy developed into a complex economic system producing a wide range of agricultural, industrial, and service products for both domestic and export markets. The economy grew at an average annual rate of six percent.

Since 1820, Turkey has experienced economic growth and human development at average levels (compared to the rest of the world) but at higher rates than other developing countries.

After the establishment of the Republic, the new government committed itself to a relatively moderate economic policy. The basic direction of Turkey's economic development has been preliminarily determined, namely, the development of modern national industries, protection of customs duties, encouragement of private investment and absorption of foreign investment. At the same time, Minister of Economy, Mahmut Esat Bozkurt, as a representative of the "New Turkish Economics" illustrates the basic economic policies of the Turkish government in the 1920s, the principle of nationalism and liberalism dual economy, the state-owned economy and non-state economy coexist, and mixed structure of national capital and foreign capital, to raise tariffs and restrict imports, to protect national industry, emphasizing the countries in the credit and dominant position in the field of industry.

The first President of the Republic, Mustafa Kemal Atatürk announced that foreign companies and foreign businessmen would be allowed to invest in Turkey within the framework of the law in 1921. At the beginning of the Republic of Turkey, foreign capital played an important role in Turkey's economic life, with finance, railways, and mining under the control of foreign capital.

From 1923 to 1926, agricultural output rose by eighty-seven percent, as agricultural production returned to pre-war levels. Industry and services grew at more than nine percent per year from 1923 to 1929; however, their share of the economy remained quite low at the end of the decade.

In 1927, Anglo-French controlled Ottoman banks provided about half of Turkey's production credit and even the right to issue notes.

== Statism in the shadow of depression and World War (1929–1945) ==
In 1930, the Turkish government established the Central Bank of the Republic of Turkey, which was responsible for the formulation of monetary policies and the regulation of money supply. At the same time, it recovered the right to issue notes and purchased foreign enterprises and railways and ports operated by foreign capital. The degree of nationalization of the national economy was significantly improved.

In the 1930s, the Turkish government abandoned the relatively moderate liberal economic policies and promoted the radical nationalist economic policies, vigorously developed the state-owned economy, emphasized the principle of giving priority to industrial development, and expanded government intervention and investment in industrial production, aiming at accelerating the process of industrialization. Coping with the negative impact of the western economic crisis from 1929 to 1933 on the Turkish economy is the direct cause of the implementation of the nationalist policy in Turkey. The government stepped in during the early 1930s to promote economic recovery, following the doctrine of statism.

During the Great Depression, Turkey's economy experienced significant fluctuations. However, between 1935 and 1939, the country achieved an average annual growth rate of approximately 6%, attributed to state-led industrialization policies under the doctrine of statism. This period saw the implementation of the First Five-Year Industry Plan (1934–1938), which aimed to reduce foreign dependency and promote domestic production.

In the 1940s, despite maintaining armed neutrality during World War II, Turkey's economy stagnated. The war led to increased military expenditures and a significant reduction in foreign trade. Foreign trade's share of GNP fell from 11.5% in 1939 to around 6.9% during 1940–1945. Additionally, the mobilization of the workforce for defense purposes and the halting of state and private sector investments contributed to decreased production in agriculture and industry, leading to economic stagnation.

== Planned growth to political turmoil (1950–1980) ==
In the 1950s, the Turkish government emphasized the liberal economic policies, encouraged private capital and foreign capital to invest in the industrial sector, and established the Industrial Development Bank of Turkey to provide loans to private entrepreneurs who invested in industry.

In 1954, the Turkish government promulgated the Foreign Investment Act (Act no. 6224), offering many preferential conditions to foreign investors, opening up the domestic market and attracting foreign investors. With investors from the US, West Germany, France and Italy following suit, the modern industrial sector is the preferred investment for foreign investors.

After 1950 the country suffered economic disruptions about once a decade; the most serious crisis occurred in the late 1970s. In each case, an industry-led period of rapid expansion, marked by a sharp increase in imports, resulted in a balance of payments crisis. Devaluations of the Turkish lira and austerity programs designed to dampen domestic demand for foreign goods were implemented in accordance with International Monetary Fund guidelines. These measures usually led to sufficient improvement in the country's external accounts to make possible the resumption of loans to Turkey by foreign creditors. Although the military interventions of 1960 and 1971 were prompted in part by economic difficulties, after each intervention Turkish politicians boosted government spending, causing the economy to overheat. In the absence of serious structural reforms, Turkey ran chronic current account deficits, usually financed by external borrowing that made the country's external debt rise from decade to decade, reaching by 1980 about US$16.2 billion, or more than one-quarter of annual gross domestic product. Debt-servicing costs in that year equaled 33 percent of exports of goods and services.

The number and size of private enterprises also grew substantially during this period. In 1951, there were 660 private enterprises with more than 10 employees. By 1953, that number had risen to 1,160 enterprises, and by 1960, there were 5,300 enterprises. The average number of workers employed by the private sector also increased from 25 to 33.

Since the 1960s, the Turkish government has taken a series of positive measures, including tax rebates for private entrepreneurs working in emerging industries, and preferential tariffs on imported equipment. Investment in the state-owned economy is mainly concentrated in large enterprises that are technology and capital intensive, such as infrastructure construction, metallurgy, and chemical industry. The private sector of the economy is mainly small and medium-sized enterprises that produce daily consumer goods such as food processing and textiles.

In this period, the mixed economic structure of state-owned organizations and private business coexisted for a long time, and state-owned companies and private enterprises were divided equally. State-owned organizations were few in number but large in scale, whereas there were a great number of small companies that were owned by private businesses. State-owned enterprises benefited due to increased capital and a larger scale of production, whereas private enterprises were more effective and competitive in the market. The input-output ratio of national enterprises was lower than the private sectors. The size of organizations owned by the state and their proportion in the total value of industrial output showed a trend of a gradual decline, while the size of private enterprises and their proportion in the total industrial output value showed an increasing trend. Still, the state sector has long dominated Turkey's industrial production.

By the late 1970s, Turkey's economy had perhaps reached its worst crisis since the fall of the Ottoman Empire. Turkish authorities had failed to take sufficient measures to adjust to the effects of the sharp increase in world oil prices in 1973–74 and had financed the resulting deficits with short-term loans from foreign lenders. By 1979 inflation had reached triple-digit levels, unemployment had risen to about 15 percent, the industry was using only half its capacity, and the government was unable to pay even the interest on foreign loans. Many observers doubted the ability of Turkish politicians to carry out the needed reforms.

== Fourth era: Neoliberal transformation (1980–present) ==
=== Özal years ===
In the 1980s, the Turkish government abandoned the import-important industrial development model, formulated new economic development strategies, encouraged private investment, expanded the market economy, established a free trade zone, and emphasized the competitiveness of the international market in the context of globalization. The export-oriented economic model has gradually matured. In January 1980, the Demirel government announced a new economic reform program, abandoning the industrialization strategy of inward-looking import substitution, reducing direct government intervention, reducing import tariffs, implementing liberalized economic policies, and formulating export-oriented and market-adjusted economic strategy. This was a turning point in the history of Turkey's economic development model. Furthermore, Turgut Özal was appointed as the deputy prime minister to oversee economic affairs. In the year after the military coup, Özal's economic recovery plan was initially implemented, and the inflation rate fell from 140% to 35%. The government's fiscal revenues and expenditures gradually became balanced.

After Özal was elected prime minister in 1983, he increased the implementation of new economic policies, devalued currencies, raised interest rates, froze wages, encouraged private investment, attracted foreign investment, encouraged exports, relaxed import and export trade and currency restrictions, and increased export competitiveness. At the same time, the government committed to transforming state-owned enterprises and promoting the privatization of state-owned enterprises. Since 1984, the government has abolished the preferential and subsidy policies enjoyed by state-owned enterprises, implemented fair competition between state-owned enterprises and private enterprises, and sold privately owned enterprises' securities and stocks to privately, cancelled private investment restrictions, and expanded private investment.

The Özal strategy called for import-substitution policies to be replaced with policies designed to encourage exports that could finance imports, giving Turkey a chance to break out of the post-war pattern of alternating periods of rapid growth and deflation. With this strategy, planners hoped Turkey could experience export-led growth over the long run. The government pursued these goals by means of a comprehensive package: devaluation of the Turkish lira and institution of flexible exchange rates, maintenance of positive real interest rates and tight control of the money supply and credit, elimination of most subsidies and the freeing of prices charged by state enterprises, reform of the tax system, and encouragement of foreign investment. In July 1982, when Özal left office, many of his reforms were placed on hold. In November 1983, however, he again became prime minister and was able to extend the liberalization program.

The liberalization program overcame the balance of payments crisis, re-established Turkey's ability to borrow in international capital markets, and led to renewed economic growth. Merchandise exports grew from US$2.3 billion in 1979 to US$8.3 billion in 1985. Merchandise import growth in the same period – from US$4.8 billion to US$11.2 billion did not keep pace with export growth and proportionately narrowed the trade deficit, although the deficit level stabilized at around US$2.5 billion. Özal's policies had a particularly positive impact on the services account of the current account. Despite a jump in interest payments, from US$200 million in 1979 to US$1.4 billion in 1985, the services account accumulated a growing surplus during this period. Expanding tourist receipts and pipeline fees from Iraq were the main reasons for this improvement. Stabilizing the current account helped restore creditworthiness in international capital markets. Foreign investment, which had been negligible in the 1970s, started to grow, although it remained modest in the mid-1980s. Turkey was able to borrow on the international market, whereas in the late 1970s it could only seek assistance from the IMF and other official creditors.

The reduction in public expenditures, which was at the heart of the stabilization program, slowed the economy sharply in the late 1970s and early 1980s. Real gross national product declined 1.5 percent in 1979 and 1.3 percent in 1980. The manufacturing and services sectors felt much of the impact of this drop in income, with the manufacturing sector operating at close to 50 percent of total capacity. As the external-payments constraint eased, the economy bounced back sharply. Between 1981 and 1985, real GNP grew 3 percent per year, led by growth in the manufacturing sector. With tight controls on workers' earnings and activities, the industrial sector began drawing on unused industrial capacity and raised output by an average rate of 9.1 percent per year between 1981 and 1985. The devaluation of the lira also helped make Turkey more economically competitive. As a result, exports of manufactures increased by an average rate of 4.5 percent per annum during this period.

The rapid resurgence of growth and the improvement in the balance of payments were insufficient to overcome unemployment and inflation, which remained serious problems. The official jobless rate fell from 15 percent in 1979 to 11 percent in 1980, but, partly because of the rapid growth of the labor force, unemployment rose again, to 13 percent in 1985. Inflation fell to about 25 percent in the 1981–82 period, but it climbed again, to more than 30 percent in 1983 and more than 40 percent in 1984. Although inflation eased somewhat in 1985 and 1986, it remained one of the primary problems facing economic policy makers.

The new economic policy implemented in the 1980s accelerated the development of the Turkish economy. The annual growth rate of GDP was 3.3% in 1983, 5.1% in 1985, and 7.5% in 1987. In contrast, the rate of economic development in the 1990s, except 1991 and 1994, generally exceeded the 1980s (annual growth in GDP, 9.4% in 1990 and 0.3% in 1991). In 1992, it was 6.4%, in 1993 it was 8.1%, in 1994 it was 6.1%, in 1995 it was 8%, in 1996 it was 7.1%, and in 1997 it was 8%).

=== Çiller years ===
With limited access to the Persian Gulf, Iraq also came to depend heavily on Turkey for export routes for its crude oil. Iraq had financed two pipelines located next to one another from its northern Kirkuk oilfields to the Turkish Mediterranean port of Yumurtalık, slightly northwest of İskenderun. The capacity of the pipelines totaled around 1.1 million barrels per day (170,000 m^{3}/d) (bpd). Not only did Turkey obtain part of its domestic supplies from the pipeline, but it was paid a sizable entrepôt fee. Some sources have estimated this fee at US$300 million to US$500 million.

Turkey's economy was battered by the 1991 Persian Gulf War. The UN embargo on Iraq required the ending of oil exports through the Kirkuk-Yumurtalık pipelines, resulting in the loss of the pipeline fees. In addition, the economy may have lost as much as US$3 billion in trade with Iraq. Saudi Arabia, Kuwait, and the United Arab Emirates (UAE) moved to compensate Turkey for these losses, however, and by 1992 the economy again began to grow rapidly.

Turkey's impressive economic performance in the 1980s won high marks from Wall Street's credit-rating agencies. In 1992 and 1993, the government used these ratings to attract funds to cover its budget deficits. International bond issues over this period amounted to US$7.5 billion. These capital flows helped maintain the overvalued exchange rate. Sensing an easy profit opportunity during this period, commercial banks borrowed at world interest rates and lent at Turkey's higher domestic rates without fear of a depreciating currency. As a result, Turkey's foreign short-term debt rose sharply. External and internal confidence in the government's ability to manage the impending balance of payments crisis waned, compounding economic difficulties.

Disputes between Prime Minister Tansu Çiller (1993–1996) and the Central Bank governor undermined confidence in the government. The prime minister insisted on monetizing the fiscal deficit (selling government debt instruments to the Central Bank) rather than acceding to the Central Bank's proposal to issue more public debt in the form of government securities. The Central Bank governor resigned in August 1993 over this issue. In January 1994, international credit agencies downgraded Turkey's debt to below investment grade. At that time, a second Central Bank governor resigned.

Mounting concern over the disarray in economic policy was reflected in an accelerated "dollarization" of the economy as residents switched domestic assets into foreign-currency deposits to protect their investments. By the end of 1994, about 50 percent of the total deposit base was held in the form of foreign-currency deposits, up from 1 percent in 1993. The downgrading by credit-rating agencies and a lack of confidence in the government's budget deficit target of 14 percent of GDP for 1994 triggered large-scale capital flight and the collapse of the exchange rate. The government had to intervene by selling its foreign-currency reserves to staunch the decline of the Turkish lira. As a result, reserves fell from US$6.3 billion at the end of 1993 to US$3 billion by the end of March 1994. Before the end of April, when the government was forced to announce a long-overdue austerity program following the March 1994 local elections, the lira had plummeted by 76 percent from the end of 1993 to TL41,000 against the United States dollar.

The package of measures announced by the government on April 5, 1994, was also submitted to the IMF as part of its request for a US$740 million standby facility beginning in July 1994. Measures included a sharp increase in prices the public-sector enterprises would charge the public, decreases in budgetary expenditures, a commitment to raise taxes, and a pledge to accelerate privatization of state economic enterprises (SEEs). Some observers questioned the credibility of these measures, given that the tax measures translated into a revenue increase equivalent to 4 percent of GDP and the expenditure cuts were equivalent to 6 percent of GDP.

The government actually succeeded in generating a small surplus in the budget during the second quarter of 1994, mainly as a result of higher taxes, after running a deficit of 17 percent of GDP in the first quarter. The slowdown in government spending, a sharp loss in business confidence, and the resulting decline in economic activity reduced tax revenues, however. The fiscal crisis resulted in a decline in real GDP of 5 percent in 1994 after the economy had grown briskly in 1992 and 1993. Real wages also fell in 1994: average nominal wage increases of 65 percent were about 20 percent below the rate of consumer price inflation.

Analysts pointed out that despite the fragility of the macroeconomic adjustment process and the susceptibility of fiscal policy to political pressures, the government continued to be subject to market checks and balances. Combined with a stronger private sector, particularly on the export front, the economy was expected to bounce back to a pattern of faster growth.

Comprehensive research in Journal of Developing Economies which was authored by Mete Feridun of University of Greenwich Business School, report statistical evidence that currency crises in Turkey during this period are associated with global liquidity conditions, fiscal imbalances, capital outflows, and banking sector weaknesses.

Recent research by Mete Feridun which was published in Emerging Markets Finance and Trade investigates the hypothesis that there is a causal relation between speculative pressure and real exchange rate overvaluation, banking-sector fragility, and the level of international reserves in Turkey shedding more light on Turkey's economic history of 1990s.

On the other hand, the implementation of the new economic policy has led to a rapid increase in the export volume of industrial products. In 1990, Turkey's total exports increased to 13 billion U.S. dollars, of which the proportion of agricultural products in total exports fell to 25.5%, and the proportion of industrial products in total exports rose to 67.9%. In 1997, Turkey's total exports reached US$26.2 billion, of which agricultural products accounted for only 20.8% of total exports, and industrial products accounted for 74.9% of total exports.

=== Erdoğan years ===
In the early 21st century, the economy of Turkey had relatively strong growth, above the average of the 1990s. It has become one of the world's emerging economies and one of the fastest growing countries in the world with a strong industrial base caused by an economic boom in the 2000s. In addition, Turkey's economic situation was relatively prosperous during the 2008 financial crisis. The Turkish government developed a series of macroeconomic policies in cooperation with the International Monetary Fund, which has led to a reduction in the unemployment rate, higher education levels, and an increased life expectancy. As a result, real GDP growth made Turkey one of the fastest growing countries in the 2000s. Turkey is a founding member of the Organization of Economic Cooperation and Development, a member of the G20 and the NATO, and a candidate for the European Union.

According to data from the Turkish Statistical Institute (TurkStat), Turkey's gross domestic product (GDP) declined by 2.4% in the fourth quarter of 2018, following a 1.6% contraction in the third quarter, marking the country's first recession in nearly a decade. This downturn was influenced by a currency crisis exacerbated by deteriorating relations with the United States, particularly after U.S. sanctions were imposed in response to the detention of American pastor Andrew Brunson. The Turkish lira depreciated significantly during this period, losing nearly 30% of its value against the U.S. dollar in 2018. The sharp depreciation increased the cost of servicing foreign-denominated corporate debt, leading to financial strain for many companies. Additionally, inflation surged, with the Consumer Price Index (CPI) rising by 25.24% year-on-year in October 2018, the highest rate in 15 years.

==== May 2023 – present ====
Following Erdoğan’s re-election in May 2023, Turkey initiated a partial shift away from its unorthodox economic policies. To combat mounting financial instability and the threat of a balance of payments crisis, Erdoğan appointed Mehmet Şimşek, a former finance minister known for his support of mainstream economic practices, as Minister of Treasury and Finance. Alongside him, Gaye Erkan, a former U.S. banking executive, was named governor of the Central Bank of the Republic of Turkey, the first woman to hold the role. Despite these appointments, Erdoğan continued to emphasize low interest rates and economic growth ahead of the March 2024 local elections, which, according to MEI, limited economic reforms. Kemal Kılıçdaroğlu criticized Erdoğan for eroding the independence of financial institutions and technocratic officials.

Turkey faced record-high short-term external debt, deeply negative net foreign exchange reserves, and heavy reliance on currency swap agreements and FX-protected deposit schemes. According to Middle East Institute, investors remained cautious because of years of abrupt leadership changes and policy reversal.

Until 2023, Erdoğan's artificially low interest rates weakened the Turkish lira as well as public trust, leading to some Turkish companies and families moving financial assets abroad, which then increased the amount of foreign currency in the Turkish banking system. In 2023, Erdoğan reversed his long standing interest policy. The Turkish central bank hiked the interest rate, raising it from 8.5% to 15% in 2023. In 2025 the rate stood at 46% before it was lowered to 37% in 2026. Reuters reported the lira lost 4% of its value against the dollar in 2021, 29% in 2022, 37% in 2023, and 16% in 2024.

== See also ==
- Economy of Turkey
- Economic history of the Ottoman Empire
