= Deel =

Deel may refer to:

- Deel (clothing), the main article of traditional Mongolian clothing
- Deel, Inc., a privately held San Francisco-based payroll and compliance company
- River Deel, in southwest Ireland
- Deel River (India), in Rajasthan
- Deel, Virginia, United States, an unincorporated community in Buchanan County
- Sandra Deel (disambiguation)
- Deel Castle, County Mayo, Ireland

== See also ==
- Deal (disambiguation)
- Dele (disambiguation)
