= Contraction =

Contraction may refer to:

== Linguistics ==
- Contraction (grammar), a shortened word
- Poetic contraction, omission of letters for poetic reasons
- Elision, omission of sounds
  - Syncope (phonology), omission of sounds in a word
- Synalepha, merged syllables
  - Synaeresis, combined vowels
  - Crasis, merged vowels or diphthongs

== Mathematics and logic ==
- Contraction (operator theory), in operator theory, state of a bounded operator between normed vector spaces after suitable scaling
- Contraction hierarchies, in applied mathematics, a technique to speed up shortest-path routing
- Contraction mapping, a type of function on a metric space
- Edge contraction or vertex contraction, graph operations used in graph theory
- Tensor contraction, an operation on one or more tensors that arises from the natural pairing of a finite-dimensional vector space and its dual
- Interior product, a tensor contraction specifically of a differential form with a vector field
- Left contraction and right contraction of multivectors in a geometric algebra, extensions of the inner product
- One of the rules of conditional independence, in probability
- Contraction (logic), a structural rule in proof theory

== Medicine ==
- Muscle contraction, the physiological condition of a muscle which generates tension (traction) at its origin and insertion
  - Uterine contraction, contraction of the uterus, such as during childbirth
- Contractility, the intrinsic ability of the heart/myocardium to contract
- Wound contraction, a stage in wound healing

== Other uses ==
- Contraction (economics), a general slowdown in economic activity; the opposite of economic expansion
- Contraction (physics), change in the volume of matter in response to a change in temperature
- Lanthanide contraction, the decrease in size of the ionic radius of lanthanide elements with their growing atomic number
- Contracted (film), a 2013 horror thriller film by Eric England and its sequel Contracted: Phase II (2015) which directed by Josh Forbes

== See also ==
- Contract (disambiguation)
- Contraction principle (disambiguation)
