= No deal =

No deal or No Deal may refer to:

== Politics ==
- No-deal Brexit, Brexit negotiations and scenario of no deal being reached
  - Operation Yellowhammer, UK planning and actions in the event of hard Brexit occurring with no agreed deal
- No Deal, a political party represented by Newbold Morris in the 1945 New York City mayoral election

== Arts and entertainment ==
- "No deal", a choice available to players in the television game show franchise Deal or No Deal
- No Deal, a 2013 album by Mélanie De Biasio
- "No Deal", a 2022 song by Rod Wave from Beautiful Mind
- "No Deal", a 1971 song by Townes Van Zandt from High, Low and In Between

== See also ==
- Deal (disambiguation)
- No Deals, Mr. Bond, a 1987 novel in the James Bond franchise by John Gardner
