= Contractor =

A contractor is a person or company that performs work on a contract basis. The term may refer to:

== Business roles ==
- Defense contractor, arms industry which provides weapons or military goods to a government
- General contractor, an individual or organization responsible for the construction of a building or other facility
- Government contractor, a private company which produces goods or services for the government
- Independent contractor, a natural person, business or corporation which provides goods or services to another entity under terms specified in a contract
- Private military company, an organization or individual that contracts to provide services of a military nature
- School bus contractor, a private company or proprietorship which provides school bus service to a school district or non-public school
- Subcontractor, an individual or business that signs a contract to perform part or all of the obligations of another's contract
- Permatemp, a person who works for an organization for an extended period via a staffing agency
- Someone engaged in contract killing

== Films ==
- The Contractor (2007 film), an action film starring Wesley Snipes
- The Contractor (2013 film), a crime drama thriller film starring Danny Trejo
- The Contractor (2022 film), an action film starring Chris Pine

== Other uses ==
- Contractor (1779 EIC ship), an East Indiaman launched in 1779
- Contractor (surname), a list of people with the surname
- Interval contractor, a mathematical operator
- Firoze Contractor, a fictional character in the 2019 Indian film War

== See also ==
- Contract (disambiguation)
