= Bargain =

Bargain may refer to:

- The process whereby buyer and seller agree on the price of goods or services, see bargaining.
- An agreement to exchange goods at a price.
- A discounted price offered by the seller to attract buyers.
- "Bargain" (song), a song by The Who
- Bargain (TV series), a 2022 South Korean television series

== See also ==
- The Bargain (disambiguation)
- Contract (disambiguation)
- Deal (disambiguation)
- Bargain Hunt, a British television program
- Bargain Hunt (retail store), an American discount store chain
