= Grand bargain =

Grand bargain or Grand Bargain may refer to:

- Grand bargain (United States, 2011), an attempted United States budgeting compromise
- "Grand Bargain", a phrase popularized by Canadian diplomat Allan Gotlieb
- A 2003 term for the proposed normalization of U.S.-Iran relations; See Nicholas Kristof
- Grand Bargain (humanitarian reform), a set of 51 "commitments" from the 2016 World Humanitarian Summit
- Grand Bargain!, a 2018 album by Poster Children
- Grand Bargain, a phrase used in reference to a deal following Detroit's 2013 bankruptcy

== See also ==
- Bargain (disambiguation)
