= Vokouma, Central African Republic =

Vokouma
- commune
- Location within Central African Republic
- Coordinates: 8°53′53″N 22°47′49″E
- Country: Central African Republic
- Prefecture: Vakaga
- Sub-prefecture: Ouanda Djallé

Population (2014)
  - Total: 4,944

Vokouma is the only commune in the sub-prefecture of Ouanda Djallé in the prefecture of Vakaga in the Central African Republic. Ouanda Djallé, chief town of sub-prefecture is the principal locality of the commune. It owes its name to the watercourse: the Vokouma.

== Villages ==
The commune consists of 8 villages: Centre Administratif, Délé, Djalle 1, Djalle 2, Djalle 3, Djalle 4, Djalle 5, Soulemaka.
