= The Deal =

The Deal may refer to:

== Film and television ==
=== Film ===
- The Deal (1983 film), an Argentine drama
- The Deal (2003 film), a British political television film directed by Stephen Frears
- The Deal (2005 film), a Canadian-American political thriller
- The Deal (2008 film), an American satirical comedy
- The Deal (2015 film), a South Korean crime thriller
- The Debt (2015 film), or The Deal, a crime thriller
- The Deal (2022 film), a dystopian Sci-fi thriller

=== Television ===
- The Deal (TV series), a 2023 South Korean crime drama series
- The Deal (Japanese game show), the Japanese version of the game show Deal or No Deal
- "The Deal" (The Amazing World of Gumball), a 2017 episode
- "The Deal" (The Americans), a 2014 episode
- "The Deal" (Billions), a 2016 episode
- "The Deal" (Due South), a 1995 episode
- "The Deal" (Lost: Missing Pieces), a 2007 webisode
- "The Deal" (Seinfeld), a 1991 episode

== Music ==
- The Deal, a 1980s American power pop band cofounded by Mark Roebuck
- The Deal (album), by Sumac, or the title song, 2015
- "The Deal", a song from the musical Chess, 1984
- "The Deal", a song by Mitski from The Land Is Inhospitable and So Are We, 2023

== Other uses ==
- The Deal (magazine), an online and 1999–2012 print finance publication
- The Deal, a 2015 novel by Elle Kennedy
- The Deal, a 1991 novel by Peter Lefcourt, basis for the 2008 film

== See also ==
- Deal (disambiguation)
