= Contract (disambiguation) =

A contract is a legally binding agreement between at least two parties.

Contract may also refer to:

== Film and television ==
=== Film ===
- The Contract (1971 film), an Israeli comedy film
- The Contract (1972 film) or Caliber 9, an Italian crime film
- The Contract (1978 film), a Hong Kong comedy film
- Contract (1985 film), a Soviet animated film based on a story by Robert Silverberg
- The Contract, a 1998 film featuring Billy Dee Williams
- The Contract (2006 film), a German-American action thriller film
- The Contract, also known as Lease Wife, a 2006 Chinese drama film directed by Lu Xuechang
- Contract (2008 film), a Bollywood film by Ram Gopal Varma
- Contract (2012 film), a Ghanaian film directed by Shirley Frimpong-Manso
- The Contract (2016 film), a British crime film
- The Contract (2024 film), an Italian film featuring Kevin Spacey and Eric Roberts

=== Television ===
- The Contract, a 1988 British television series; see 1988 in British television#ITV
- Contract, a 2021 Bangladeshi ZEE5 original web series
- "Contract" (Law & Order: Criminal Intent), an episode

== Music ==
- The Contract, an EP by Crime in Stereo, 2005
- "Contract", a song by Gang of Four from Entertainment!, 1979
- "The Contract", a song by Bad News from Bad News, 2004 re-release
- GTA Online: The Contract, an EP by Dr. Dre, 2022
- "The Contract" (song), a song by Twenty One Pilots from the album Breach, 2025

== Other uses ==
- Contract (Catholic canon law)
- The Contract, a 1980 novel by Gerald Seymour
- ASL Airlines Ireland, formerly Air Contractors, callsign CONTRACT
- Hitman: Contracts, the third game in the Hitman video game series

== See also ==
- Contract bridge, a trick-taking card game
- Contract farming
- Contract grading, a hands-on, student-involved form of grading in schools
- Contract killing
- Contract theory, in economics
- Contraction (disambiguation)
- Contractor (disambiguation)
- Design by contract, in computer programming, the notion of contracts between modules
- Social contract, a philosophical concept of how individuals connect with society
- Tensor contraction, in mathematics and physics, an operation on tensors
