= Gerald Green (author) =

American novelist

Gerald Green (April 8, 1922 – August 29, 2006) was an American author, journalist, and television writer.

== Biography ==
Green was born in Brooklyn, New York City, as Gerald Greenberg. He was the son of a physician, Samuel Greenberg. He was Jewish.

Green attended Columbia College, where he edited the Jester, starred in several Varsity Shows, and was a member of the Philolexian Society. He graduated from the college in 1942 and, after serving in the US Army in Europe during the Second World War, where he was also the editor of the army's Stars and Stripes newspaper, he returned to New York to attend the Columbia Journalism School.

Green wrote many novels, the best known being The Last Angry Man, published in 1956. It was adapted into a movie by the same name which was nominated for Academy Awards for Best Actor in a Leading Role (Paul Muni) and Best Art Direction-Set Decoration, Black-and-White. His other novels include His Majesty O'Keefe (co-authored with Lawrence Klingman), adapted into a 1954 film, North West, Portofino PTA, To Brooklyn With Love, My Son the Jock, The Lotus Eaters and East and West. His 1962 novel Portofino P.T.A. was adapted into a musical, Something More!, by composer Sammy Fain and lyricists Marilyn and Alan Bergman.

He wrote the teleplay for Holocaust, a critically acclaimed 1978 TV miniseries that won eight Emmy Awards, including one for "Outstanding Writing in a Drama Series," and was credited with persuading the West German government to repeal the statute of limitations on Nazi war crimes. He later adapted the script into a novel of the same title. In recognition for this effort, Green was awarded the Dag Hammarskjöld International Peace Prize for literature, 1979. Green won another Emmy nomination for his 1985 TV script for Wallenberg: A Hero's Story. Green was also a writer, producer, and director for NBC News. In 1952, he co-created (with Dave Garroway) NBC's The Today Show.

Green lived in Stamford, Connecticut for twenty years and moved to New Canaan, Connecticut. His first wife, Marie, died of cancer. They had three children: Nancy, Ted and David. He married Marlene Eagle in 1979, becoming stepfather to Dr Janie Worth (née Eagle), Julie Cardo (née Eagle) and David Eagle. Green died of pneumonia in Norwalk, Connecticut on August 29, 2006.

== Works ==
=== Novels ===
- His Majesty O'Keefe (1950) (with Lawrence Klingman)
- The Sword and the Sun (1953)
- The Last Angry Man (1956)
- The Lotus Eaters (1959)
- The Heartless Light (1962)
- The Portofino P.T.A (1962)
- The Legion of Noble Christians: Or, the Sweeney Survey (1966)
- To Brooklyn with Love (1967)
- Faking It: Or, the Wrong Hungarian (1971)
- Block Buster (1972)
- Tourist (1973)
- My Son the Jock (1975)
- Hostage Heart (1976)
- An American Prophet (1977)
- Holocaust (1978 by Transworld Publishers)
- The Healers (1979)
- Girl (1979)
- The Chains (1980)
- Murfy's Men (1982)
- Karpov's Brain (1983)
- Not in Vain (1984)
- East and West (1986 and 1987 by Fawcett Publishing) – ISBN 0-449-21366-8 and ISBN 978-0-449-21366-7

=== Plays ===
- Kent State: Four-hour Teleplay (1980)

=== Non-fiction ===
- The Stones of Zion: A Novelist's Journal in Israel (1971)
- Artists of Terezin (1978)

== References and external links ==
- Gerald Green at IMDb
- Gerald Green, Biography, RosettaBooks.com. Retrieved June 16, 2007
- Stoppel, Ellen Kaye Stoppel. Editorial Review: East and West by Gerald Green, Library Journal, Drake University Law Library, Des Moines, Reed Business Information, Inc., 1986, and Amazon.com. Retrieved June 16, 2007
- Books Written by Gerald Green. Retrieved June 16, 2007
- The Works of Gerald Green, FantasticFiction.co.uk. Retrieved June 16, 2007
- Reader's Digest Condensed Books, A Place to Hide; Nightshade; East and West; a Time for Heroes (Abridged/Hardcover) by Evelyn Anthony (author); Gloria Murphy (author); Gerald Green (author), Will Bryant (author), Volume 2, 1987. Retrieved June 16, 2007

Specific
