= Dele (disambiguation) =

Dele is a proofreading symbol.

Dele may also refer to:

- Dele (name), a given name and surname
- DELE (Diplomas de Español como Lengua Extranjera), diplomas given from a standardized test
- Délé, a village in Vakaga Prefecture, Central African Republic

== See also ==
- Deel (disambiguation)
- N'Délé, a market town and sub prefecture in Central African Republic
