= 24 January decisions =

The 24 January Decisions or January 24th Decisions (Turkish: 24 Ocak Kararları) were a set of widely influential decisions announced by the 43th government of Turkey on 24 January 1980, envisioning an economical programme and several structural reforms to the Turkish economy. Süleyman Demirel assigned the task of preparation to Turgut Özal, undersecretary of the prime minister since 1979. Özal prepared the program in a short time.

Due to the political instability in Turkey around that period, the decisions were never implemented during the coalition government's short existence. The decisions were later implemented during the military-technocratic 44th government of Turkey, on which Özal served as the Deputy Prime Minister.

== The goal and methods ==
In order to alleviate the economic instability, the problems such as the growth of black market and decrease in production would need to be solved. Therefore, it was decided that economical precautions must be taken; limiting the public spending, lowering wages, as well as introduction of a free-floating exchange rate regime. In that vision, the steps for the institutionalisation of market economy were taken.

== Contents of the decisions ==
The outlines of the decisions were:

1. The lira would be devalued by 32.7% and the Central Bank would publish daily exchange rates,
2. The government's share in the economy would be scaled down, support purchases for agricultural products and state-owned enterprises would be limited,
3. Subsidies would be gradually removed; except for fertilizer, energy and transportation industries,
4. Foreign trade would be deregulated, foreign investors would be incentivised and profit transfers would be made convenient,
5. Contractor services abroad would be supported,
6. Imports would be gradually liberalized; exports would be incentivised by tax refunds, low-interest loans, customs exemptions for manufacturers, and sector-specific incentives.

== Relationship with the 1980 coup d'etat ==
Nature of the cause-and-effect relationship between 24 January decisions and the 1980 coup d'etat have been widely contested. Some political commentators argued that the coup d'etat was done in order to execute the decisions easier, as such harsh economical decisions could not be executed in a democratic environment.

Kenan Evren stated that the coup was done to end the anarchy, not to execute the decisions; however he also stated that the installation of a military regime made it possible to execute such decisions as well.
