= The Bargain =

The Bargain may refer to:

- The Bargain (1914 film), a 1914 American Western film
- The Bargain (1921 film), a 1921 British silent crime film
- The Bargain (1931 film), a 1931 all-talking pre-code comedy drama film
- "The Bargain", song by Arthur Somervell
- Bargain (disambiguation)
