= Contractor (1779 EIC ship) =

History

Great Britain
- Name: Contractor
- Owner: EIC voyages #1-3:John Durand; EIC voyages #4-6:John Hodson Durand; EIC voyage #7:Robert Wigram
- Builder: Batson, Limehouse
- Launched: 1779
- Fate: Sold 1800

General characteristics
- Tons burthen: 756, (Note: EIC voyage 1. EIC voyages 2–3.) 777, 77713/94, or 780 (bm)
- Length: Overall:137 ft 6 in (41.9 m); Keel:109 ft 8 in (33.4 m) (keel)
- Beam: 36 ft 6 in (11.1 m)
- Depth of hold: 15 ft 0 1/2 in (4.6 m)
- Propulsion: Sails
- Sail plan: Full-rigged ship
- Complement: 1794:90; 1798:80
- Armament: 1794:12 × 9-pounder guns; 1798:20 × 9-pounder guns
- Notes: Three decks

Contractor was launched in 1779 as an East Indiaman. She made seven voyages for the British East India Company (EIC). She made one voyage as a transport for a military expedition before her owners sold her in 1800 for use as a transport.

== Career ==
EIC voyage #1 (1780-1782): Captain James Baldwin sailed from Torbay on April 1780, bound for Madras, Bombay, and China. Contractor was at Trindade on 6 June, and reached Madras on 3 September. She made a small excursion to Tumala Punta, where she arrived on 5 October, before she returned to Madras on 14 October. She then visited Tellicherry on 27 November, and left on 2 March 1781. She was at Goa on 16 March Goa and Bombay on 7 April. She returned to Madras on 9 August, and arrived at Whampoa anchorage on 30 September. Homeward bound, she left Whampoa on 31 January 1782, reached St Helena on 14 July, and arrived at The Downs on 24 October.

EIC voyage #2 (1784-1785): Captain William Mackintosh sailed from The Downs on 19 January 1784, bound for Madras and China. Contractor reached Madras on 9 June and arrived at Whampoa on 3 October. Homeward bound, she crossed the Second Bar on 25 January 1785, reached St Helena on 5 June, and arrived at the Downs on 1 September.

EIC voyage #3 (1786-1787): Captain Mackintosh sailed from the Downs on 26 March 1786, bound for China. Contractor arrived at Whampoa on 17 August. Homeward bound, she crossed the Second Bar on 22 December, reached St Helena on 25 March 1787, and arrived at Long Reach on 20 June.

EIC voyage #4 (1788-1789): Captain John Bartlett sailed from The Downs on 9 March 1788, bound for Madras and China. Contractor reached Madras on 25 August and Batavia on 18 November. She arrived at Whampoa on 8 February 1789. Homeward bound, she crossed the Second Bar on 9 March, reached St Helena on 19 August, and arrived at Long Reach on 10 December.

EIC voyage #5 (1792-1793): Captain Bartlett sailed from the Downs on 6 April 1792, bound for Madras and Bengal. Contractor reached Madras on 5 August and arrived at Diamond Harbour on 31 August. Homeward bound, she was at Cox's Island on 20 December and Madras again on 15 January 1793. She reached St Helena on 13 April and arrived at Long Reach on 6 July.

EIC voyage #6 (1794-1795): War with France had broken out in 1793, shortly before Contractor had arrived back from her fifth EIC voyage. Captain Bartlett acquired a letter of marque on 21 February 1794.

The British government held Contractor at Portsmouth, together with 38 other Indiamen in anticipation of using them as transports for an attack on Île de France (Mauritius). It gave up the plan and released the vessels in May 1794. It paid £18 19s 4d for having delayed her departure by one day, the least delay of any of the vessels.

Bartlett sailed from Portsmouth on 2 May 1794, bound for China and Bengal. Contractor reached Rio de Janeiro on 4 July and arrived at Diamond Harbour on 15 September. Homeward bound, she was at Saugor on 28 November, and left on 10 January 1795. She reached St Helena on 18 March and arrived at Long Reach on 25 July.

1795 West Indies Expedition: The Government chartered Contractor and a number of other EIC vessels as transports for Admiral Hugh Cloberry Christian 1795 expedition to the West Indies. The expedition sailed on 6 October, 16 November, and 9 December, but weather forced the vessels to put back. The fleet finally successfully sailed on 20 March to invade St Lucia, with troops under Lieutenant-General Sir Ralph Abercromby. St Lucia surrendered to the British on 25 May. The British went on to capture Saint Vincent and Grenada.

The only report of Contractor's participation has her coming from the Cape under the command of Captain "Whyte".

EIC voyage #7 (1798–1800): The EIC chartered Contractor from Robert Wigram on 12 January 1798 for one voyage at £23 10s/ton. Captain Henry Hughes acquired a letter of marque on 14 March 1798. He sailed from Portsmouth on 29 April 1798, bound for China and Bengal. Contractor reached Rio de Janeiro on 6 July and arrived at Whampoa on 7 December. Bengal bound, she crossed the Second Bar on 8 January 1799, reached Malacca on 30 January and 11 Feb Quedah on 11 February, and arrived at Calcutta on 13 March. Homeward bound, she was at Saugor on 28 September, reached St Helena on 26 January 1800, and arrived at Long Reach on 2 June.

== Fate ==
Her owners sold Contractor in 1800 and she became a transport.
