= Délé =

- Location in Central African Republic
- Coordinates: 8°58′34″N 22°45′25″E
- Country: Central African Republic
- Prefecture: Vakaga
- Sub-prefecture: Ouanda Djallé
- Commune: Vokouma
- Time zone: UTC + 1

Délé is a village situated 12 km from Ouanda Djallé town in Vakaga Prefecture, Central African Republic.

== History ==
In 1962, Délé had a population of 81 people. In November 2023, CPC reportedly controlled the village and erected a roadblock.

== Education ==
There is a school in Délé.
