= Contraction principle =

In mathematics, contraction principle may refer to:

- Contraction principle (large deviations theory), a theorem that states how a large deviation principle on one space "pushes forward" to another space
- Banach contraction principle, a tool in the theory of metric spaces
