= Deal (surname) =

Deal is a surname. Notable people with the surname include:

- Ame Deal (2000–2011), American murder victim
- Borden Deal (1922–1985), American novelist and short story writer
- Charlie Deal (1891–1979), Major League Baseball player
- Cot Deal (1923–2013), Major League Baseball pitcher and coach
- Devean Deal (born 2002), American football player
- Gregg Deal (born 1975), American artist and activist
- Joe Deal (1947–2010), American photographer
- Kelley Deal (born 1961), American musician; identical twin sister of Kim Deal
- Kim Deal (born 1961), American musician; identical twin sister of Kelley Deal
- Lance Deal (born 1961), American hammer thrower and 1996 Olympic silver medalist
- Lincoln Deal, Bahamian politician
- Meri Deal (born 1996), Uruguayan singer-songwriter
- Nathan Deal (born 1942), American politician and Governor of Georgia
- Robert Deal (d. 1721), English pirate
- Sandra Deal (1942-2022), American educator and first lady of the U.S. state of Georgia
- Mick Mars (born Robert Deal, 1951), American guitarist and founding member of Mötley Crüe
