= Sandra Deel =

Sandra Deel may refer to:

- Sandra Deel (actress), an American actress (1927–2008), whose works include Mary Jane Harper Cried Last Night
- Sandra Deel, one of the alternatives names used for the comic book character Shriek
