= Bargain Hunt (retail store) =

American discount store chain

- Bargain Hunt's logo
- Formerly: Essex Wholesale
- Company type: Private
- Industry: Retail
- Founded: 2004; 22 years ago; La Vergne, Tennessee U.S.
- Founder: Robert Echols, Phil Pfeffer
- Defunct: March 2025; 1 year ago
- Fate: Chapter 11 Bankruptcy And Liquidation By Parent Company sold to Ollie's Bargain Outlet.
- Headquarters: La Vergne, Tennessee, U.S.
- Number of locations: 95 stores
- Area served: United States
- Key people: Phil Pfeffer (Chairman); Robert Echols (CEO)
- Products: Electronics; movies and music; home and furniture; home improvement; clothing; footwear; jewelry; toys; health and beauty; pet supplies; sporting goods and fitness; auto
- Owner: Essex Technology Group
- Number of employees: 1,001–5,000 (2021)
- Website: www.bargainhunt.com

Bargain Hunt, formerly Essex Bargain Hunt, was an American discount store chain. Founded in 2004, Bargain Hunt is headquartered in La Vergne, Tennessee with retail locations in Tennessee, Ohio, Indiana, Kentucky, North Carolina, South Carolina, Georgia, Alabama, Mississippi and Arkansas.

== History ==
Essex Technology Group — Bargain Hunt's parent company was founded in the year 2000 in Nashville by Robert Echols and Phil Pfeffer. They started the company as a wholesaler of closeout goods. The company bought overstock and excess inventory goods from big box retailers and sold them. Initially, the focus was on electronics and computers.

The first store was opened in 2004 in Nashville and was known as Essex Bargain Hunt. The company also began an online store selling directly to retail customers from its original Nashville location. The strategy was to sell items that were too big or expensive to sell online.

After a successful run, Essex launched the Bargain Hunt superstores using locations abandoned by stores such as OfficeMax and Staples and Circuit City. The name was later changed to Bargain Hunt.

In 2020, the company won one of the Alliance Awards 2020.

On January 31, 2025, Bargain Hunt's parent company, Essex Technology Group, warned that they were preparing to file for Chapter 11 bankruptcy as soon as the following week. On February 1, 2025, after it was reported that the company shut its only distribution center, Bargain Hunt announced that they would be closing all 91 stores, with liquidation sales beginning shortly after. Bargain Hunt filed for Chapter 11 bankruptcy on February 3, 2025, listing assets between $50 million to $100 million and liabilities between $100 million to $500 million. Up to 300+ employees lost their jobs after Bargain Hunt closed.

All locations closed March 2025.

== Expansion ==
Bargain Hunt opened its first store in Nashville in the year 2004 and went on to expand in Southern and Midwest United States. The chain operated more than 80 stores in 10 states as of 2017. In 2015, Thomas H. Lee Partners acquired a majority stake in the retail chain.

== Retail Format ==
Bargain Hunt stores were typically around 20,000 - 25,000 sq ft. in size and sold products such as electronics, movies and music, furniture, home improvement, clothing, footwear, jewelry, toys, health and beauty, pet supplies, sporting goods and fitness.

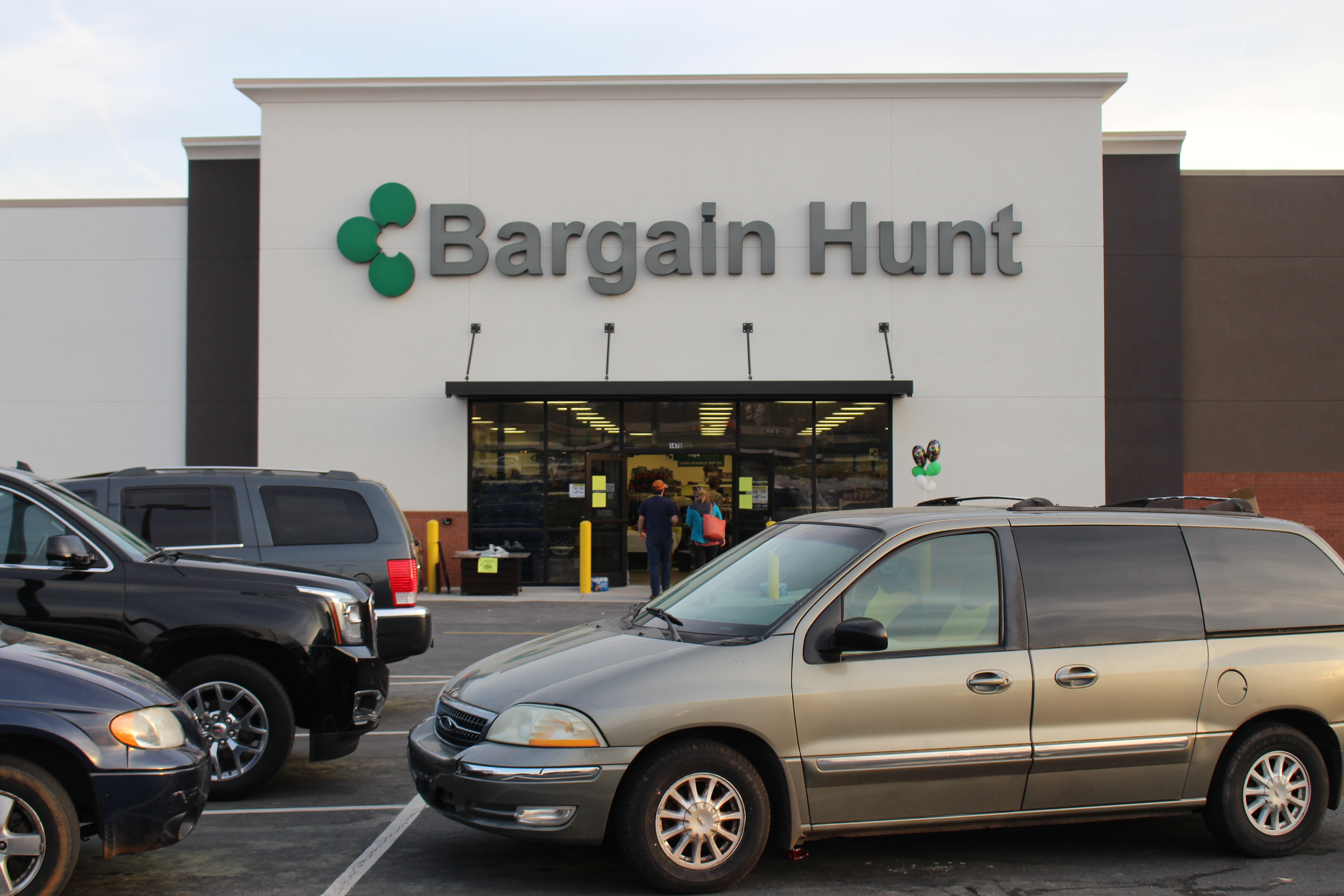
Bargain Hunt in Griffin, Georgia

== Sales Strategy ==
The stores sold name brands at a discount of 30% to 70% on regular prices and played in the extreme value retail space. The store also utilized a discounting program that dropped the prices on items by specific percentages depending on the time they have been on shelves. The company will eventually discount its merchandise on a 30, 60, and 90 day cycle (30 days gets 30% off, 60 days gets 60% off, etc.).
