= The Last Angry Man =

1959 American film by Daniel Mann

- Theatrical poster
- Directed by: Daniel Mann
- Written by: Richard Murphy (adaptation)
- Screenplay by: Gerald Green
- Based on: Gerald Green (novel)
- Produced by: Fred Kohlmar
- Starring: Paul Muni; David Wayne; Betsy Palmer; Luther Adler; Claudia McNeil; Joby Baker
- Cinematography: James Wong Howe
- Edited by: Charles Nelson
- Music by: George Duning
- Production company: Fred Kohlmer Productions
- Distributed by: Columbia Pictures
- Release dates: October 22, 1959 (New York City); November 10, 1959 (Los Angeles)
- Running time: 100 minutes
- Country: United States
- Language: English
- Box office: $1,675,000 (US/ Canada)

The Last Angry Man is a 1959 American drama film that tells the story of a television producer who profiles the life of a physician. It stars Paul Muni (in his last film appearance), David Wayne, Betsy Palmer, Billy Dee Williams (in his film debut), and Godfrey Cambridge.

The movie was scripted by Richard Murphy from the novel by Gerald Green (who also adapted it), and was directed by Daniel Mann.

The film was remade in 1974 as an ABC Movie of the Week with Pat Hingle in the lead role.

== Plot ==
As the fiercely dedicated general practitioner who tries to help the sick, the poor, and the unfortunate in his decrepit neighborhood, Dr. Sam Abelman is a testy old man who faces life without compromise and Woodrow Thrasher is a troubled television executive fighting to preserve his career.

== Cast ==
- Paul Muni as Dr. Samuel "Sam" Abelman
- David Wayne as Woodrow "Woody" Thrasher
- Betsy Palmer as Anna Thrasher
- Luther Adler as Dr. Max Vogel
- Claudia McNeil as Mrs. Quincy
- Joby Baker as Myron Malkin
- Joanna Moore as Alice Taggart
- Nancy R. Pollock as Sarah Abelman
- Billy Dee Williams as Josh Quincy
- Robert F. Simon as Lyman Gatting
- Dan Tobin as Ben Loomer

== Reception ==
Paul S. Cowan of The Harvard Crimson wrote that the film "combines some of the finest motion picture effects with many of the worst."

Variety wrote that the lead actor "gives a superlative performance."

== See also ==
- List of American films of 1959
