= Billy Dee Williams =

American actor, novelist and painter (born 1937)

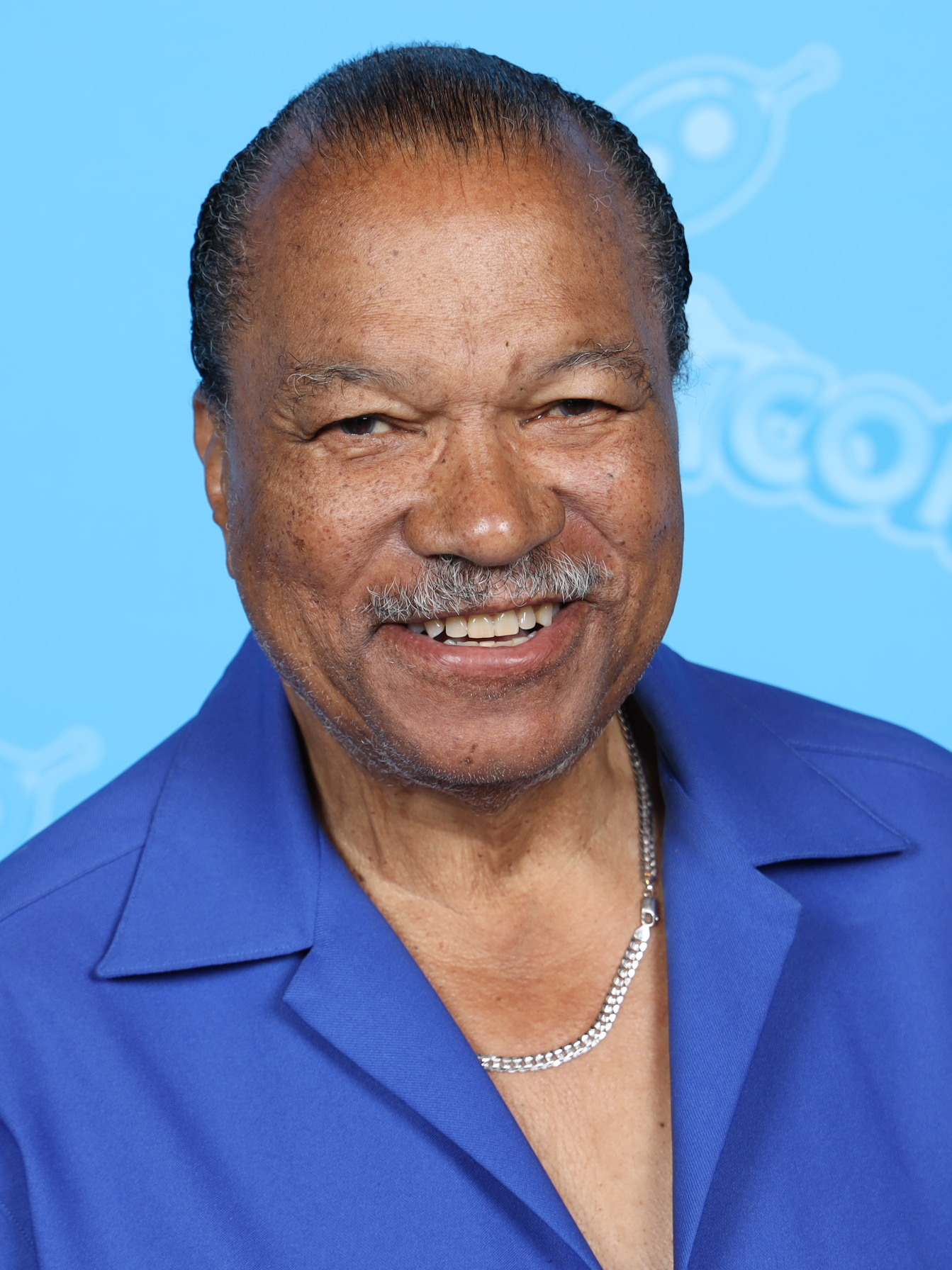
- Williams at GalaxyCon Raleigh in 2023
- Born: William December Williams Jr. April 6, 1937 (age 89); New York City, U.S.
- Occupations: Actor; novelist; painter
- Years active: 1959–present
- Known for: Lando Calrissian in the Star Wars franchise Gale Sayers in Brian's Song
- Spouses: Audrey Sellers (m. 1959; div. 1963); Marlene Clark (m. 1968; div. 1971); Teruko Nakagami (m. 1972)
- Children: 3

William December Williams Jr. (born April 6, 1937) is an American actor, novelist and painter. He has appeared in over 100 films and television roles over six decades. He is best known for portraying Lando Calrissian in the Star Wars franchise and has also appeared in critically acclaimed and popular titles such as Mahogany (1975), Scott Joplin (1977), and Nighthawks (1981), as Harvey Dent in Batman (1989) and The Lego Batman Movie (2017), The Last Angry Man (1959), Carter's Army (1969), The Out-of-Towners (1970), The Final Comedown and Lady Sings the Blues (both 1972), Hit! (1973), Fear City and Terror in the Aisles (both 1984), Alien Intruder (1993) and The Visit (2000).

Raised in Harlem, Williams made his Broadway theatre debut at age seven in The Firebrand of Florence (1945). He later graduated from The High School of Music & Art, then won a painting scholarship to the National Academy of Fine Arts and Design, where he won a Hallgarten Prize for painting in the mid-1950s. He returned to acting to fund his art supplies, including stage, films, and television. He continued painting; his work has since been shown in galleries and collections worldwide. Williams’ film debut was in The Last Angry Man (1959), but he came to national attention in the television movie Brian's Song (1971), which earned him an Emmy nomination for Best Actor. In the 1980s, he was cast as Lando Calrissian in The Empire Strikes Back (1980), becoming the first black actor with a major role in the Star Wars franchise. He reprised his role in subsequent Star Wars films and media. Williams's television work includes over 70 credits starting in 1966 including recurring roles over the decades in Gideon's Crossing, Dynasty, General Hospital: Night Shift, and General Hospital. Numerous cameos and supporting roles included being paired with Marla Gibbs on The Jeffersons, 227, and The Hughleys. Later work included voice acting in the series Titan Maximum (2009), and appearing on the reality show Dancing with the Stars (2014).

His work has earned him numerous awards and honors including three NAACP Image Awards, and the NAACP Lifetime Achievement award. He was inducted into the Black Filmmaker's Hall of Fame in 1984, and earned a star on the Hollywood Walk of Fame in 1985.

== Early life and education ==
William December Williams Jr. was born on April 6, 1937, in New York City. He is the son of Loretta Anne (1915–2016), an elevator operator at the Lyceum Theatre and aspiring performer from Montserrat, and William December Williams Sr. (1909–1973), an African-American caretaker, with some Native American ancestry from Texas. He grew up in Harlem on 110th Street, between Lenox and 5th, adjacent to the Central Park North–110th Street station. He used to go to Central Park to see the Negro league players and the Cuban baseball league, "They were fantastic, and I wound up working with a lot of those guys," (in The Bingo Long Traveling All-Stars & Motor Kings (1976)). He has a twin sister, Loretta, and they were raised by their maternal grandmother while their parents worked several jobs. His mom had studied opera for years, becoming an accomplished opera star who wanted to break into movies; the family was richly cultured, exposing the children early on to drawing, painting, theatre and similar creative experiences; Billy Dee would remain a fan of the arts including opera. In March 1945, he made his Broadway debut at age seven portraying a page in The Firebrand of Florence, Kurt Weill and Ira Gershwin’s operetta starring Lotte Lenya. (Note: Credited as Billy Williams.) His mother, who worked at the theatre, volunteered him for the part which he found boring.

Williams attended Booker T. Washington Junior High School where he had dreams of being a painter. He graduated in 1955 from the LaGuardia High School of Music & Art and Performing Arts in Manhattan, where he majored in arts with a focus on visual arts. There he was classmates with Peter Yarrow. The school would later be the subject for Fame (1980), and its derivative television series. While there he got a two-year scholarship for the National Academy of Fine Arts and Design in New York—which later changed its name to National Academy of Design—to study with a focus on "classical principles of painting". He was nominated at eighteen or nineteen years old for a Guggenheim Fellowship grant—for "creative ability in the arts," and won a Hallgarten Prize in the mid-1950s. Although he had scholarships to pay for school tuition, he turned to acting to pay for his paints, supplies, and canvasses. His first Broadway theatre "big break" was a play, A Taste of Honey. He continued to struggle as an actor for ten years working as an extra, doing small and large theatre, and "slowly breaking into television and film". During art school, he gained interest in the Stanislavsky Method—experiencing a role in contrast to representing it, to mobilise an actor's conscious thought and will to activate emotional response and subconscious behavior—and began studying at the Harlem Actors Workshop. It was run by blacklisted actor Paul Mann who embraced actors of all races; Williams also studied there under Sidney Poitier. Though he first viewed his acting as a way to pay for his art supplies, by the early-1960s; he began to "devote all of his energy to performance." In succession, he got an actor agent through a friend, started getting major Off-Broadway roles, then work on Broadway.

== Career ==
=== 1959–1970: Broadway debut and early roles ===
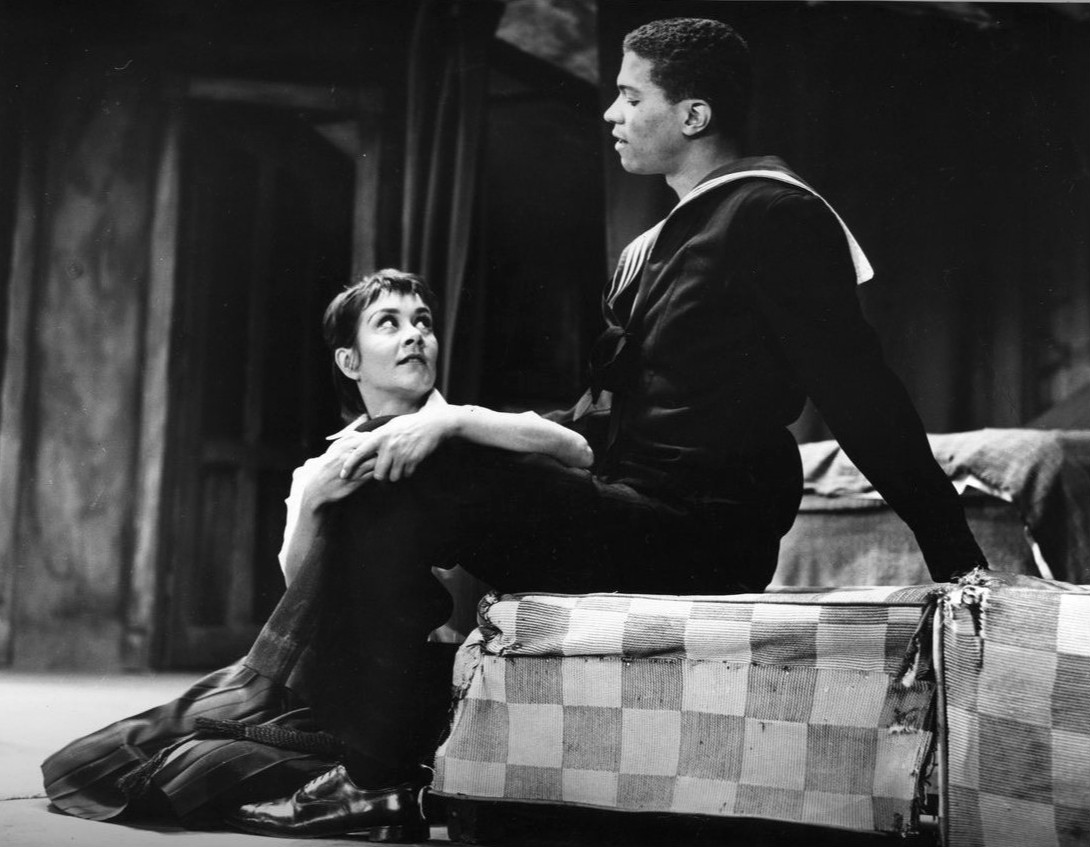
Billy Dee Williams with Joan Plowright in A Taste of Honey on Broadway in 1960

Williams returned to Broadway as an adult in 1960 in the adaptation of The Cool World. He appeared in A Taste of Honey in 1960. Williams made his film debut in 1959 in The Last Angry Man, opposite Paul Muni, in which he portrayed a delinquent young man. He was frustrated in the 1960s with the "paucity of parts for leading black men," the majority of roles he wanted went to Sidney Poitier. He enjoyed doing theater and television, but "his slow-building film career ate at him." He found LSD, a popular hallucinogenic drug with the era's hippie movement to be a cure, "LSD saved my life ... I wasn't doing it to get high. It let me get inside of myself." Otherwise he is anti-drug.

=== 1971–1989: Film stardom and acclaim ===
He rose to stardom after starring in the critically acclaimed television film Brian's Song (1971), in which he played Chicago Bears star football player Gale Sayers, who stood by his friend Brian Piccolo (James Caan), during Piccolo's struggle with terminal cancer. Both Williams and Caan were nominated for Primetime Emmy Awards for best actor for their performances. Williams said the role was the one of which he was most proud "It was a love story, really. Between two guys. Without sex. ... It ended up being a kind of breakthrough in terms of racial division." Williams' success with Brian's Song earned him a seven-year contract with Motown's Berry Gordy. He became one of America's most well-known black film actors of the 1970s, after starring in a string of critically acclaimed and popular movies, many of them in the "blaxploitation" genre.

In 1972, he starred as Billie Holiday's husband Louis McKay in Motown Productions' Academy Award-nominated Holiday biopic Lady Sings the Blues acting opposite Diana Ross as the titular character. Through his portrayal he became "a full-fledged sex symbol, and was dubbed by The New York Times as the black Clark Gable.'" Williams later stated, "I wanted to be known as one of the best actors of my generation, period, but the opportunities weren’t the same for me as they were for Gable, and I was frustrated." Motown paired the two of them again three years later in the successful follow-up project Mahogany. Williams returned to Broadway in the 1976 production, I Have a Dream, which was directed by Robert Greenwald. Williams portrayed civil rights leader Martin Luther King Jr. In 1977, he played the eponymous lead role in Scott Joplin, biopic of musician's life, featuring many of his ragtime pieces in the soundtrack, including an epic piano duel in the early opening scenes. Williams was cast as Lando Calrissian in The Empire Strikes Back (1980), becoming the first African-American actor with a role in the Star Wars series. He would reprise the role in Return of the Jedi (1983). Williams voiced the character in the audio drama adaption of The Empire Strikes Back (1983).

Between the two Star Wars films, he starred alongside Sylvester Stallone as a cop in the thriller Nighthawks (1981). Williams returned to Broadway in the August Wilson play Fences, as a replacement for James Earl Jones in the role of Troy Maxson in 1988. Williams co-starred in 1989's Batman as district attorney Harvey Dent, a role that was planned to develop into Dent's alter-ego, the villain Two-Face, in sequels. He was set to reprise the role in the sequel Batman Returns, but his character was deleted and replaced with villain Max Shreck. When Joel Schumacher stepped in to direct Batman Forever, where Two-Face was to be a secondary villain, Schumacher decided to hire Tommy Lee Jones for the role. There was a rumor that Schumacher had to pay Williams a fee in order to hire Jones, but Williams said that it was not true: "You only get paid if you do the movie. I had a two-picture deal with Star Wars. They paid me for that, but I only had a one picture deal for Batman." Williams eventually voiced Two-Face in the 2017 film The Lego Batman Movie.

=== 1990–present: Television roles ===
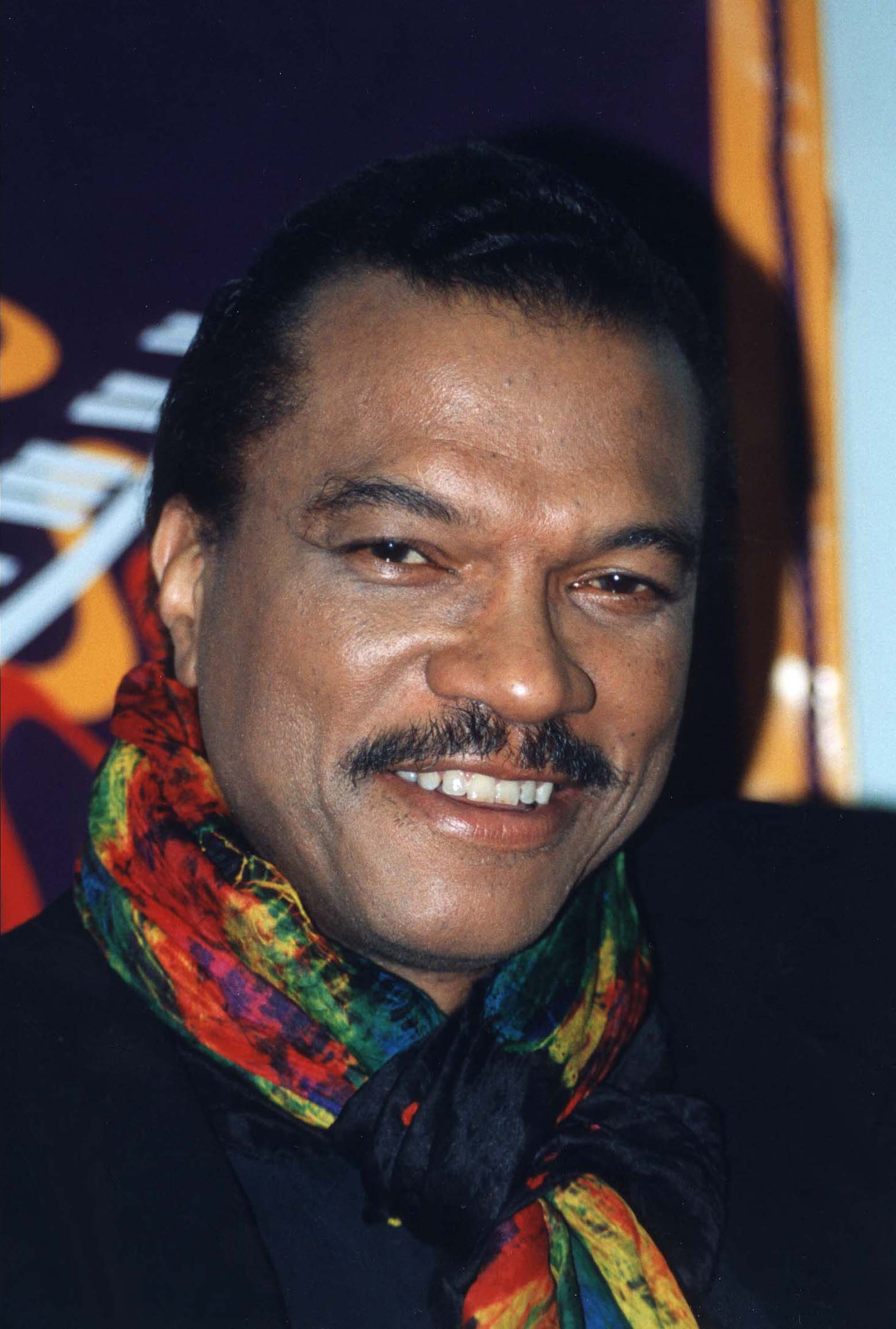
Williams in 1997

Williams' television work included a recurring guest-starring role on the short-lived show Gideon's Crossing. He is also known for his advertisements for Colt 45, a malt liquor, for a five-year period starting in the mid-1980s; he would reprise his spokesperson role in 2016. Williams brushed off criticism—for the subtext of the ad campaign, 'works every time,' and the target audience—of the choice, "I drink, you drink. Hell, if marijuana was legal, I'd appear in a commercial for it." Colt 45 hired Williams "simply because he was so cool," and went from trailing behind Joseph Schlitz Brewing Company in barrels produced, to "skyrocketing" a year after the 1986 ads ran to two million barrels in the top spot for malt liquor.

In the 1984–1985 season of Dynasty, he played Brady Lloyd opposite Diahann Carroll. Williams was paired with actress Marla Gibbs on three situation comedies: The Jeffersons (Gibbs's character, Florence, was a major fan of Williams and challenged him on everything because she thought Williams was an imposter); 227 (her character, Mary, pretending to be royalty, met Williams at a banquet); and The Hughleys (Gibbs and Williams portrayed Darryl's parents). In 1992, he portrayed Berry Gordy in The Jacksons: An American Dream. In 1993, Williams made a guest appearance on the spin-off to The Cosby Show, A Different World, as Langston Paige, a grumpy landlord, in a backdoor pilot for his own series. Williams appeared as himself on Martin where he provided Martin Lawrence's character with advice on getting back together with Gina.

Williams made a special guest appearance on the hit sketch comedy show In Living Color in 1990. He portrayed Pastor Dan in an episode of That '70s Show. In this episode, "Baby Don't You Do It" (2004), his character is obsessed with Star Wars, and uses this to help counsel Eric Forman (himself a Star Wars fan) and Donna Pinciotti about his premarital relationship. Williams made a cameo appearance as himself on the television series Lost in the episode "Exposé". He also appears regularly on short clips on the Jimmy Kimmel Live! as a semi-parody of himself. In February 2006, Williams guest starred as himself in the season 5 episode "Her Story II" of Scrubs, where he plays the godfather of Julie (Mandy Moore). Turk hugs him, calling him "Lando", even though he prefers to be called Billy Dee.

Williams played the GDI Director Redmond Boyle, in the full-motion video (live-action) cutscenes of the video game Command & Conquer 3: Tiberium Wars (2007). This made him the second former Star Wars actor to appear in a Command & Conquer game (with the first being James Earl Jones as GDI General James Solomon in Tiberian Sun). Williams played Toussaint Dubois for General Hospital: Night Shift in 2007 and 2008. In 2008, Williams reprised his role as Lando Calrissian to appear in a video on Funny or Die in a mock political ad defending himself for leader of the Star Wars galaxy against vicious attack ads from Emperor Palpatine. Williams was a cast member of Diary of a Single Mom, a web-based original series directed by award-winning filmmaker Robert Townsend. The series debuted on PIC.tv in 2009. Williams reprised his role as Toussaint on General Hospital beginning in June 2009. Also in 2009, Williams took on the role of the voice of Admiral Bitchface, the head of the military on the planet Titan, in the Adult Swim animated series Titan Maximum. In July 2010, Williams appeared in the animated series The Boondocks, where he voiced a fictionalized version of himself in the episode "The Story of Lando Freeman".

In February 2011, Williams appeared as a guest star on USA Network's White Collar as Ford, an old friend of Neal Caffrey's landlady June, played by Diahann Carroll. In February 2012, Williams was the surprise guest during a taping of The Oprah Winfrey Show spotlighting Diana Ross. Ross and Williams were reunited after having not seen each other in 29 years. In October 2012, Williams appeared as a guest star on NCIS in Season 10 Episode 5 titled "Namesake", as Gibbs's namesake and his father's former best friend, Leroy Jethro Moore. On January 9, 2013, Williams made a cameo appearance as himself on Modern Family, season 4, episode 11 "New Year's Eve". In 2014, Williams competed on the 18th season of Dancing with the Stars, a reality show/dancing competition partnered with professional dancer Emma Slater. The couple had to withdraw from the competition on the third week due to an injury to Williams's back. He also voiced Colonel Jackson in the 2016 video game Let It Die, who acts as the second major boss players face.

Over the years, Williams reprised his role of Lando Calrissian in four video games, The Lego Movie (2014), two episodes of Star Wars Rebels and multiple LEGO Star Wars animated specials. He later returned to the role in the Star Wars: Star Wars Episode IX - The Rise of Skywalker (2019), marking one of the longest intervals between onscreen portrayals of a character by the same actor in American film history. Episode IX director J. J. Abrams noted, "Lando was always written as a complex, contradictory, nuanced character. And Billy Dee played him to suave perfection, ... It wasn't just that people of color were seeing themselves represented; they were seeing themselves represented in a rich, wonderful, intriguing way." Over the years, Williams has been a featured guest at fan conventions, mostly science fiction ones for his role. Of his fan interactions he has said they have mostly been positive ones, "I love every single moment of it, I'll have an audience for the rest of my life."

== Ventures and interests ==
=== Painting ===
In the late 1980s, Williams resumed painting, devoting much of his time to the work. He returned to New York to star in August Wilson's play Fences, replacing James Earl Jones in the lead for four months starting in February 1988. It marked a turning point for him, returning home, and for him, the center of the art scene. He also renewed his friendship with Peter Max, who had also trained and sold art in the city, and renewed Williams' interest in painting. Within a two-year span he "cranked out 120 original works of art". (Note: Based on an art piece's artist bio, he was painting during his Fences Broadway run in 1988.)

Williams is the honorary chairman of Herbie Hancock Institute of Jazz (formerly Thelonious Monk Institute of Jazz) in Washington, D.C., which fosters jazz education. The institution has used his artwork each year for its competition programs since 1990. He had his first solo exhibition in 1991, followed by many throughout North America, and, later, the world. Around 1992, Williams, inspired by his friend and fellow New York artist Peter Max who had a teapot collection, started a cookie jar collection. Being an opera fan, he first found a jar in the shape of a singer in an opera gift shop by artisan couple Michael and Shelley Buonaiuto; later buying more than a dozen from their limited lines including ones of jazz artists Josephine Baker and Fats Waller. His 1993 self-portrait is at the National Portrait Gallery of the Smithsonian Institution (Washington, D.C.) with a description that he "specializes in acrylic paintings combining traditional brushwork with an airbrushing technique"; he also works in oils. Williams painted a series of impressionistic portraits of the Tuskegee Airmen, the "African-American pilots whose real-life exploits changed the course of American military history." He started the series in the 1990s but when officials from National Air and Space Museum (NASM) saw them they wanted more, and to use them in an exhibition. In 1999, they were displayed at the African-American Museum of Art, Culture and History in New Orleans, and in early 2000, the NASM in Washington, D.C.

He was commissioned for four paintings—including one of track and field star Jesse Owens sprinting, and another of a pair of boxers in a fight ring—for Nissan that were displayed at the 1996 Summer Olympics in Atlanta, Georgia. In 1997, he did paintings for Walt Disney Company's Mighty Ducks arena for the Anaheim Ducks. From a description, circa late 1990s, at one of the galleries that carries his work, "Billy's paintings are usually acrylic on canvas, applied with brush and airbrush. He also works with collage elements and has even created three-dimensional canvasses incorporating ceramic, Lucite, and neon light."

He got permission from Star Wars creator George Lucas to sell lithographs of a montage of Williams' iconic character from the franchise, Lando Calrissian. As of 2001, his paintings sold for an average of $10,000 to $35,000 (equivalent to $63,639 in 2025). "I call my paintings 'abstract reality,'" said Williams. "Sometimes I refer to them as 'impressions/expression.' It's the best way I can explain them." In early 2001, Williams was one of the celebrity artists painting seven-foot angel sculptures as part of the Oscar Academy's sponsoring L.A.'s "A Community of Angels" charity project. The art angels were displayed for months then auctioned to raise funds for L.A. youth programs. In his online gallery biography, he states, "[an] interest in Eastern philosophy characterizes his images, first to record the physical reality, and then to uncover through the application of light, color and perspective. He cites Edward Hopper, M. C. Escher—the Dutch Master, Frida Kahlo, Tamara de Lempicka, Thomas Hart Benton, and the exciting, vibrant forms of African art as some of his strongest influences." Williams' work is included at the Schomburg Center for Research in Black Culture in New York, and the American Jazz Museum in Kansas City, Missouri.

In a 2001 interview he said, "Either I want to drop dead with a paint brush in my hand or I want to drop dead doing a soliloquy on the stage, I love acting. I love it. I take my acting very seriously, but I also find it fun. To do what children do and get paid for it is a lot of fun. I'm very fortunate." In late 2007, he was a guest artist on a ten-day Princess Cruise liner. They bought about eighty pieces which they put on their cruises and then auctioned off. He was commissioned for another set of Disney paintings to be unveiled in 2011 at Disney's D23 Expo, also in Anaheim, California. For those, he set iconic Disney characters Mickey and Minnie Mouse, and Goofy in jazz music settings. In a 2011 interview he said, "I mostly create abstract paintings. I paint what's obvious to the eye and then incorporate an abstract point of view, which allows me a lot of space to play in. I work a lot with acrylic and oils, mostly acrylic right now and do a lot of line drawings." In a September 2015 interview, he said he finds painting "cathartic" compared to collective film work, "When you're painting you just lock yourself up in your little private world. And it's all about you and your imagination and nobody else interfering with that. It's a great exercise because you really start discovering who you are and what you are without a lot of assistance … and the moment you come up with something interesting it's a success that’s really based on your own personal, private sensibility." As of 2019 he has made around 300 paintings, which Williams sees as his legacy.

=== Music ===
In 1961, Williams recorded a jazz LP produced by Prestige Records entitled Let's Misbehave, on which he covered swing standards. The album was named after its second track. it included the first-ever vocal recording of "A Taste of Honey", a song by Bobby Scott and Ric Marlow later covered by The Beatles on their 1963 debut album Please Please Me. Williams was later the first to sing the song in the U.S., on the Broadway stage with Joan Plowright as part of the original Broadway production of the play A Taste of Honey. The commercial success of his album later earned Williams a spot on Motown 25: Yesterday, Today, Forever (1983). Williams said of the album, "Recording it was sort of a lark. I did some singing in clubs, for a moment, and then I stopped. I have too much respect for singers to really think that I'm a singer." The album was re-released on CD, download and streaming platforms in 2014.

Thirty years later, in the early 1990s, he sang on a “celebrity-packed charity single," "Voices That Care,” to honor U.S. troop of Operation Desert Storm, the 1990–1991 Gulf War, and supporting the International Red Cross. The single reached number eleven on the Billboard Hot 100, and number six on the Hot Adult Contemporary Tracks. Through sales and plays of the song Williams and the other celebrities became platinum-recording and Billboard-charting artists.

== Personal life ==
=== Marriage and relationships ===
Williams has been married three times and has three children and two grandchildren. His first marriage was to Audrey Sellers in 1959. They were divorced some years later, after which he apparently became depressed. He stated that "there was a period when I was very despondent, broke, depressed, my first marriage was on the rocks." They had a son, Corey Dee Williams, born in 1960. In 1968, Williams married model and actress Marlene Clark in Hawaii. They divorced in 1971. He moved from New York City to California in 1971.

He married Teruko Nakagami on December 27, 1972. She brought a daughter, Miyako (born 1962), from her previous marriage to musician Wayne Shorter. Together they have a daughter, Hanako (born 1973). In 1984, he bought a "Zen-like contemporary" home in the Trousdale Estates neighborhood of Beverly Hills, California; he sold it in 2012. He filed for an amicable divorce from Nakagami in 1993, but they reconciled, and were again living together by 1997.

=== Gender identity ===
In late-2019, Williams talked about his feminine side in an interview, and used masculine and feminine pronouns to refer to himself. Media outlets speculated that Williams might be gender fluid, but he clarified that he was referring to anima and animus: the feminine side of men and the masculine side of women in Jungian psychology.

=== Legal issue ===
Williams was arrested on January 30, 1996, after allegedly assaulting his live-in girlfriend, whom the police did not identify. He posted a US$50,000 bail. L.A. Police said the woman had minor bruises and scratches. The district attorney's office filed misdemeanor charges of spousal battery and dissuading a witness. The woman later stated that the incident was her fault and hoped the police would drop the case. In a plea bargain, Williams agreed to undergo 52 counseling sessions. In a 2019 interview, Williams said he never slapped or abused women.

== Acting credits and accolades ==
Year	Award	Category	Nominated work	Result	Ref.
1972	Primetime Emmy Award	Outstanding Single Performance by an Actor in a Leading Role	Brian's Song	Nominated	
1981	Saturn Award	Best Supporting Actor	Star Wars: Episode V - The Empire Strikes Back	Nominated	
1984	Saturn Award	Best Supporting Actor	Star Wars: Episode VI – Return of the Jedi	Nominated	
2001	Independent Spirit Award	Best Supporting Male	The Visit	Nominated	
2002	Black Reel Awards	Theatrical - Best Supporting Actor	The Visit	Nominated	
1972	NAACP Image Award	Best Actor - Motion Picture	Lady Sings the Blues	Won	
1977	NAACP Image Award	Outstanding Actor in a Motion Picture	The Bingo Long Traveling All-Stars & Motor Kings	Won	
2001	NAACP Image Award	Outstanding Supporting Actor in a Motion Picture	The Visit	Nominated	
2006	NAACP Image Award	Lifetime Achievement Award		Received	
2010	Indie Series Awards	Best Performance by a Guest Actor	Diary of a Single Mom	Nominated	
2011	Indie Series Awards	Outstanding Supporting Actor	Diary of a Single Mom	Nominated	
2003	TV Land Award	Most Memorable Male Guest Star in a Comedy	The Jeffersons	Nominated	
2006	TV Land Award	Blockbuster Movie of the Week	Brian's Song	Won	
2018	Behind the Voice Actors Awards	Best Vocal Ensemble in a Feature Film	The Lego Batman Movie	Nominated	

Special recognition

- 1984: Inducted into the Black Filmmaker's Hall of Fame.
- 1985: Star on the Hollywood Walk of Fame at 1521 Vine Street.
- 2000: Multicultural Motion Picture Association (Diversity Awards): Lifetime Achievement Honor
- 2012: African-American Film Critics Association (AAFCA)'s Special Achievement Award
- 2018: American Black Film Festival's Hollywood Legacy Award

== Books ==
- PSI/Net (1999), ISBN 978-0-312-86766-9, novel co-written with Rob MacGregor based on an actual government program of psychic spying
- JUST/In Time (2001), ISBN 978-0-8125-7240-7
- Batman '89 (2021–22), a comic book using the likeness of Williams and showing the transformation Harvey Dent into Two-Face.
- What Have We Here: Portraits of a Life. New York: Alfred A. Knopf. February 13, 2024. ISBN 9780593318607. OCLC 1378101317.

== See also ==
- List of people from Harlem
