= Thummalapenta =

- village
- Interactive map of Thummalapenta
- Location in Andhra Pradesh, India
- Coordinates: 14.90115°N 80.06956°E
- Country: India
- State: Andhra Pradesh
- District: Nellore
- Mandal: Kavali

Languages
  - Official: Telugu
- Time zone: UTC+5:30 (IST)
- Vehicle registration: AP

Thummalapenta is a village in Kavali mandal, Sri Potti Sriramulu Nellore district, located on the east coast of the Indian state of Andhra Pradesh. It is about 70 km from Nellore and 9 km from Kavali.

== Demographics ==
As of the 2011 census, the village had 4069 households and 15705 inhabitants. The people are from different castes and communities, including Hindus and Christians.

== Economy ==
Most of the people work in agriculture and aquaculture. Thummalapenta attracts many tourists. Pure drinking water is provided.

== Geography ==
The coastal village has a beach hosting Haritha resort. The climate is temperate.

== Culture ==
An association helps the poor people with low interest loans.

Volleyball and cricket tournaments are held each year.
