= Contractor (surname) =

Contractor is a surname. Notable people with the name include:

- Behram Contractor (1930–2001), Indian journalist
- Didi Contractor (1929–2021), German-American architect
- Dinyar Contractor (1941-2019), Indian actor and comedian
- Hafeez Contractor (born 1950), Indian architect
- Nari Contractor (born 1934), Indian cricketer
- Nazneen Contractor (born 1982), Canadian actress
- Noshir Contractor (born 1959), American professor of behavioral science
- Soli Contractor (born 1938), Indian sailor
- R. F. Contractor, former flag officer, Indian Navy
