= Two-Face in other media =

Fictional character Two-Face in media

Adaptations of Two-Face in other media
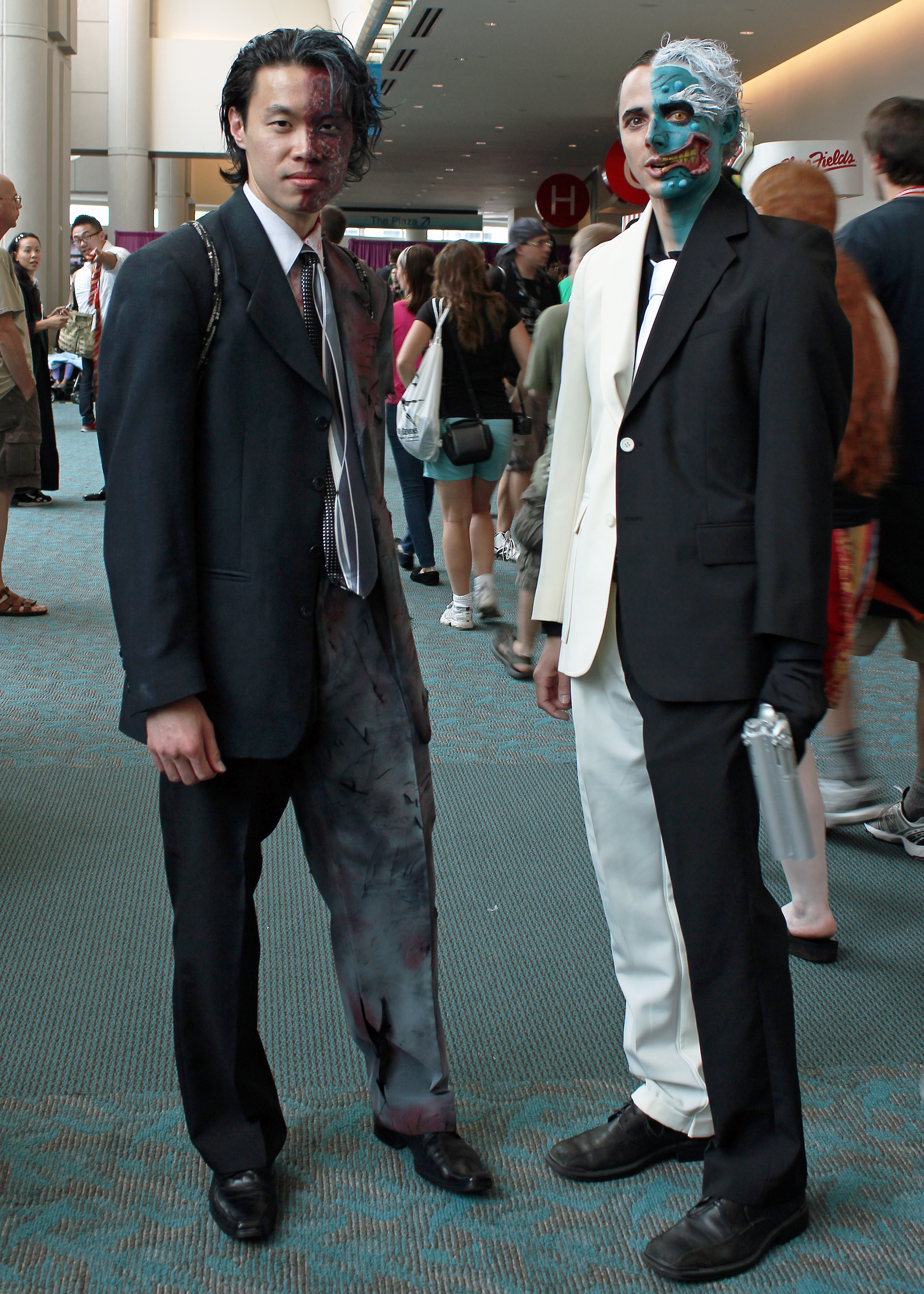
- Two cosplayers dressed as two different versions of Two-Face
- Original source: Comics published by DC Comics
- First appearance: Detective Comics #66 (August 1942)

Films and television
- Film(s): Batman (1989); Batman Forever (1995); The Dark Knight (2008); Batman: Year One (2011); Batman: The Dark Knight Returns (2012); Lego Batman: The Movie - DC Super Heroes Unite (2013); Batman: Assault on Arkham (2014); Batman: The Killing Joke (2016); Batman Unlimited: Mechs vs. Mutants (2016); The Lego Batman Movie (2017); Batman: Gotham by Gaslight (2018); Suicide Squad: Hell to Pay (2018); Batman Ninja (2018); Justice League vs. the Fatal Five (2019); Batman vs. Teenage Mutant Ninja Turtles (2019); Joker: Folie à Deux (2024); The Batman: Part II (2027)
- Television show(s): Batman: The Animated Series (1992); The New Batman Adventures (1997); Justice League (2001); Batman: The Brave and the Bold (2008); Beware the Batman (2013); Gotham (2014); Justice League Action (2016); Harley Quinn (2019); Gotham Knights (2023)

The character Two-Face was created by Bob Kane and first appeared in Detective Comics #66 (August 1942). However, he did not appear outside comics until half a century later in Batman: The Animated Series. Two-Face has since been substantially adapted from the comics into various forms of media, such as feature films, television series and video games. Two-Face has been voiced by Richard Moll in the DC Animated Universe, Troy Baker in the Batman: Arkham series, Billy Dee Williams in The Lego Batman Movie, and William Shatner in Batman vs. Two-Face. His live-action portrayals include Billy Dee Williams in Batman (1989), Tommy Lee Jones in Batman Forever, Aaron Eckhart in The Dark Knight, Harry Lawtey in Joker: Folie à Deux, and Nicholas D'Agosto in the television series Gotham. In 2009, Two-Face was ranked #12 on IGN's list of the Top 100 Comic Book Villains of All Time.

== Television ==
=== Live-action ===
Nicholas D'Agosto as Harvey Dent as he appears in Gotham

- While Two-Face did not appear in Batman (1966), several scripts featuring the character were developed and Clint Eastwood was allegedly slated to play the role at one point. The most prominent of the scripts, submitted by New Wave science fiction author Harlan Ellison, was eventually adapted into the 2015 comic Batman '66: The Lost Episode.
- A young Harvey Dent appears in Gotham, portrayed by Nicholas D'Agosto. This version is Gotham City's assistant district attorney.
- The Harvey Dent incarnation of Two-Face makes a cameo appearance in the Titans episode "Dick Grayson", portrayed by an uncredited stunt double.
- The Harvey Dent incarnation of Two-Face appears in Gotham Knights, portrayed by Misha Collins.

=== Animation ===
- The Harvey Dent incarnation of Two-Face, based on the Golden Age incarnation, appears in Batman: The Brave and the Bold, voiced by James Remar in "The Fate of Equinox!" and "The Mask of Matches Malone!" and by Richard Moll in "Chill of the Night!".
- The Harvey Dent incarnation of Two-Face appears in the Robot Chicken episode "The Ramblings of Maurice", voiced by Neil Patrick Harris. He repeatedly disfigures his face, leading to him renaming himself accordingly several times.
  - Two-Face appears in the Robot Chicken DC Comics Special, Robot Chicken DC Comics Special 2: Villains in Paradise, and Robot Chicken DC Comics Special III: Magical Friendship (voiced by Giovanni Ribisi) as a member of the Legion of Doom. Additionally, The Dark Knight incarnation of the character also appears in Magical Friendship.
- Paul Sloane appears in Young Justice, voiced by Kevin Michael Richardson. This version previously worked on the sitcom Hello, Megan! and the sci-fi series Space Trek 3016.
- The Harvey Dent incarnation of Two-Face appears in Beware the Batman, voiced by Christopher McDonald. This version is opposed to vigilantism and, in an effort to take down Batman, joins forces with Anarky and Deathstroke. While attempting to intervene in a confrontation between Batman and Deathstroke however, Dent is scarred in an explosion, with Anarky mockingly dubbing him "Two-Face". His sanity gone and career ruined, Dent removes his bandages and goes into hiding.
- The Harvey Dent incarnation of Two-Face makes non-speaking cameo appearances in Teen Titans Go!.
- The Harvey Dent incarnation of Two-Face appears in DC Super Friends, voiced by Matthew Mercer.
- The Harvey Dent incarnation of Two-Face appears in the Justice League Action episode "Double Cross", voiced by Robert Picardo. This version, like the DCAU incarnation (see below), possesses blue scars.
- Harvey Dent makes a cameo appearance in the DC Super Hero Girls episode "#TweenTitans" as a cast member of Bruce Wayne's reality television series Make It Wayne.
- The Harvey Dent incarnation of Two-Face appears in Harley Quinn, voiced by Andy Daly. This version does not have a split personality, is blind in one eye, and is power-hungry, a trait he possessed even before becoming Two-Face. Additionally, he is a member of the Legion of Doom in the first season and a founding member of the Injustice League in the second season. Throughout the second and third seasons, Two-Face joins the League in consolidating power in Gotham City's ruins after the Joker destroyed it, but the group is dismantled by Harley Quinn while Two-Face is eventually arrested by Commissioner Jim Gordon. Nonetheless, he convinces Gordon to run for mayor and aids him using unethical methods, such as killing the sitting mayor, to regain his previous position as district attorney. Gordon eventually realizes the error of his ways and helps his fellow mayoral candidate, the Joker, defeat Two-Face.
- The Harvey Dent incarnation of Two-Face appears in Batman: Caped Crusader, voiced by Diedrich Bader. This version was disfigured by an associate of Rupert Thorne, which affected the right side of his face instead of his left like traditional depictions. Additionally, he lacks a multicolored outfit and is prone to reckless, self-destructive behavior and bursts of aggression. He dies after he sacrifices himself to save Barbara Gordon from Arnold Flass.
- Harvey Dent appears in Bat-Fam. This version is a reformed supervillain and has twin daughters, Judy and Trudy, who are friends with Damian Wayne.

==== DC Animated Universe ====
Harvey Dent / Two-Face, as depicted in the DC Animated Universe

The Harvey Dent incarnation of Two-Face appears in series set in the DC Animated Universe (DCAU), voiced by Richard Moll.

- First appearing in Batman: The Animated Series (1992), this version developed dissociative identity disorder as a result of years of repressed anger, which led to the creation of an alternate personality called "Big Bad Harv". After initially making minor appearances, with his most notable seeing him being brainwashed by Poison Ivy into dating her as part of an attempt on his life, Two-Face's self-titled two-part episode sees Dent's condition resurface amidst his engagement to Grace Lamont, his D.A. reelection campaign, and crime boss Rupert Thorne stealing his therapy records to use as blackmail material. The combined stress of these events causes "Big Bad Harv" to reemerge and attack Thorne. Batman attempts to intervene, but the fight triggers an explosion that severely scars the left side of Dent's face and body. Driven mad by his disfigurement, Dent reinvents himself as the gangster and crime boss "Two-Face" throughout his later appearances.
- Two-Face returns in The New Batman Adventures. In the episode "Sins of the Father", he indirectly contributes to Tim Drake becoming Robin after murdering the boy's father Steven Drake. In the episode "Judgment Day", Dent's psyche fractures once more, creating a third personality, the Judge (voiced by Malachi Throne), who apprehends criminals through extreme measures.
- An android replica of Two-Face makes a non-speaking cameo appearance in the Batman Beyond episode "Terry's Friend Dates a Robot".
- An alternate universe variant of Two-Face makes a non-speaking cameo appearance in the Justice League two-part episode "A Better World" as one of several supervillains who were lobotomized by the Justice Lords before he became a janitor at Arkham Asylum.

== Film ==
=== Live-action ===
==== Batman (1989, 1995) ====
- Harvey Dent appears in Batman (1989), portrayed by Billy Dee Williams. This version is Gotham City's newly elected district attorney. Williams was originally set to portray Dent's transformation into Two-Face in the sequels before Burton was removed as director in the third film and Williams was recast.
- Dent returns in Batman Forever, portrayed by Tommy Lee Jones. Following the incident that led to him becoming Two-Face, which plays out as it does in the Golden Age comics, he refers to himself using plural pronouns and swears revenge against Batman, whom he blames for failing to save him. Additionally, he is aided by two molls, the angelic "Sugar" (portrayed by Drew Barrymore) and the tempestuous "Spice" (portrayed by Debi Mazar), and murders the Flying Graysons, indirectly leading to sole survivor Dick Grayson eventually becoming Robin. While on a crime spree, Two-Face joins forces with the Riddler to learn Batman's secret identity. However, Batman throws several identical coins at Two-Face while he is flipping his coin, causing the latter to scramble for it and fall to his death.

==== The Dark Knight trilogy ====
Aaron Eckhart as Harvey Dent in a promotional poster for The Dark Knight (2008)

- Harvey Dent appears in the early scripts for Batman Begins, but was ultimately cut and replaced by original character Rachel Dawes. According to writer David S. Goyer, the main reason for this was because he and the production team realized they "couldn't do him justice".
- The Harvey Dent incarnation of Two-Face appears in The Dark Knight, portrayed by Aaron Eckhart. This version is depicted as a tragic hero who lacks the gimmickry and dissociative identity disorder commonly associated with the character and is nicknamed "Gotham's White Knight" due to his public image as a crusader for justice. Additionally, he utilizes a two-headed peace dollar to make important decisions and is in a relationship with Rachel Dawes. After being elected to the office of District Attorney, having previously served in the Gotham City Police Department (GCPD)'s internal affairs division, he forms a tenuous alliance with Batman and GCPD Lieutenant Jim Gordon to eliminate Gotham's organized crime. However, corrupt police officers working for mob boss Sal Maroni and the Joker kidnap Dent and Dawes and hold them prisoner in two abandoned buildings set to explode. Despite the GCPD's efforts, Dawes is subsequently killed. While Batman narrowly rescues Dent, the latter is left disfigured and one side of his coin is damaged. The Joker visits Dent in the hospital and persuades him to exact revenge against those he believes are responsible for Dawes' death. After killing Maroni and a GCPD officer who betrayed him, Dent takes Gordon's family hostage. Batman intervenes, persuading Dent to judge him, Gordon, and himself for pressuring the Gotham mob into working with the Joker. Dent shoots Batman and spares himself, but Batman tackles him off a ledge before he can judge Gordon's son. Dent falls to his death and Batman takes the blame for the murders he committed to ensure that he is remembered as a hero.
- Dent's legacy plays a role in The Dark Knight Rises. Eight years after his death, the "Dent Act" legislation has all but eradicated Gotham's organized crime. Having become the GCPD's commissioner by this time, Gordon considers publicly revealing the truth of Dent's crime spree, but eventually decides that Gotham is not ready. However, Bane acquires the speech and reads it on live television, calling Dent and Gordon hypocrites to undermine confidence in the legal system and throw Gotham's social order into chaos. Following Batman's sacrifice and the League of Shadows' defeat, the former is honored as Gotham's true hero while the Dent Act is repealed and Dent's legacy tarnished.

==== Joker: Folie à Deux (2024) ====
- A young Harvey Dent appears in Joker: Folie à Deux, portrayed by Harry Lawtey. This version is an assistant district attorney who becomes disfigured in an explosion caused by Arthur Fleck's followers.

==== The Batman: Part II (2028) ====
- Harvey Dent is set to appear in The Batman: Part II (2028).

=== Animation ===
- A young Harvey Dent appears in Batman: Year One, voiced by Robin Atkin Downes.
- Harvey Dent appears in Batman: The Dark Knight Returns, voiced by Wade Williams.
- The Harvey Dent incarnation of Two-Face appears in Lego Batman: The Movie - DC Super Heroes Unite, voiced by Troy Baker.
- The Harvey Dent incarnation of Two-Face makes a cameo appearance in Son of Batman.
- The Harvey Dent incarnation of Two-Face makes a non-speaking cameo appearance in Batman: Assault on Arkham.
- The Harvey Dent incarnation of Two-Face makes a cameo appearance in Batman: The Killing Joke.
- The Harvey Dent incarnation of Two-Face makes a cameo appearance in Batman Unlimited: Mechs vs. Mutants, voiced again by Troy Baker.
- The Harvey Dent incarnation of Two-Face appears in The Lego Batman Movie, voiced by Billy Dee Williams. This version resembles a combination of Williams' non-disfigured portrayal in Batman (1989) and Tommy Lee Jones' disfigured portrayal in Batman Forever.
- The Harvey Dent incarnation of Two-Face appears in Batman vs. Two-Face, voiced by William Shatner. This version became a supervillain after Hugo Strange's experiment to extract the evil out of Gotham's criminals goes awry, leading to the evil essence injuring half of Dent's face. After going on a crime spree and being stopped by Batman and Robin, Dent undergoes surgery and is seemingly cured, though Two-Face secretly uses Dent's desire to regain his old job to seek revenge on the Dynamic Duo. Upon capturing them, Two-Face deduces their secret identities and leaves them for Gotham's other villains so he can turn the entire city into Two-Faces. Batman and Robin eventually catch up to and defeat him before Dent fights off the evil essence, returns to normal, and forgets the Dynamic Duo's identities.
- An alternate reality variant of Harvey Dent appears in Batman: Gotham by Gaslight, voiced by Yuri Lowenthal. This version is a "two-faced" womanizer married to Gilda Dent and a friend to Bruce Wayne who becomes jealous of his relationship with Selina Kyle. Embittered, Dent tricks the authorities into believing Wayne is Jack the Ripper until the true culprit is revealed to be Chief Constable James Gordon. Additionally, the Two-Face identity is instead depicted with Barbara Gordon (voiced by Kari Wuhrer).
- The Harvey Dent incarnation of Two-Face makes a cameo appearance in Suicide Squad: Hell to Pay, voiced by Dave Boat. He tasks Professor Pyg with operating on him to purge Dent's personality, only for Scandal Savage and Knockout to interrupt the operation and kidnap Pyg on Vandal Savage's behalf.
- A Feudal Japan-inspired incarnation of Two-Face appears in Batman Ninja, voiced by Toshiyuki Morikawa in the Japanese version and by Eric Bauza in the English dub.
- The Harvey Dent incarnation of Two-Face appears in Justice League vs. the Fatal Five, voiced by Bruce Timm.
- The Harvey Dent incarnation of Two-Face appears in Batman vs. Teenage Mutant Ninja Turtles, voiced by Keith Ferguson. This version is mutated by the Joker into an anthropomorphic chimeric cat before being defeated by a mutated Batman.
- Two-Face appears in Lego DC Batman: Family Matters, voiced by Christian Lanz.
- The Harvey Dent incarnation of Two-Face appears in Batman: Death in the Family, voiced by Gary Cole. Depending on the viewer's choice, he can either spare Jason Todd / Red Robin or attempt to kill him before Tim Drake stops him.
- The Harvey Dent incarnation of Two-Face makes a non-speaking cameo appearance in Injustice.
- The Harvey Dent incarnation of Two-Face appears in Batman: The Long Halloween, voiced by Josh Duhamel.
- An alternate reality variant of Harvey Dent appears in Batman: The Doom That Came to Gotham, voiced by Patrick Fabian. This version was mutated by Poison Ivy, turning half of his body into a portal, before he is killed in an explosion.
- The Harvey Dent incarnation of Two-Face appears in Justice League: Crisis on Infinite Earths, voiced again by Keith Ferguson.
- An original incarnation of Two-Face, Hernán Cortés, appears in Aztec Batman: Clash of Empires, voiced by Álvaro Morte.

== Video games ==
=== Lego DC series ===
- The Harvey Dent incarnation of Two-Face appears as a boss and playable character in Lego Batman: The Video Game, with vocal effects provided by Steve Blum. This version possesses an immunity to toxins.
- The Harvey Dent incarnation of Two-Face appears as a mini-boss, optional boss, and unlockable playable character in Lego Batman 2: DC Super Heroes, voiced by Troy Baker.
- The Dark Knight incarnation of Harvey Dent / Two-Face appears as a playable character in Lego Batman 3: Beyond Gotham via The Dark Knight DLC pack. This version possesses detective vision and skill in acrobatics.
- The Harvey Dent incarnation of Two-Face appears as a boss in Lego Dimensions, voiced again by Troy Baker. Additionally, The Lego Batman Movie incarnation of the character appears as a boss via the film's tie-in DLC, voiced by Imari Williams.
- The Harvey Dent incarnation of Two-Face appears in Lego DC Super-Villains, voiced by Peter Jessop. This version is a member of the Legion of Doom.
- The Harvey Dent incarnation of Two-Face appears in Lego Batman: Legacy of the Dark Knight, voiced by Rich Keeble. His appearance is modeled after the Batman Forever incarnation.

=== Batman: Arkham ===
Two-Face in a promotional image for Batman: Arkham Knight

The Harvey Dent incarnation of Two-Face appears in the Batman: Arkham franchise, voiced primarily by Troy Baker and by Jesse Berry as a child in Shadow.

- Two-Face's cell and biography appear in Batman: Arkham Asylum.
- Two-Face appears in Batman: Arkham City, and is the final boss of the "Catwoman" DLC.
- Two-Face appears in Batman: Arkham City Lockdown.
- Two-Face appears in Batman: Arkham Knight, as well as its DLC episode, "Robin: A Flip of a Coin".
- A younger Harvey Dent / Two-Face appears in Batman: Arkham Shadow. This version was abused in his childhood by his father Christopher, who used a double-headed coin to give his son a chance to escape him. This, combined with Dr. Jonathan Crane's attempts to treat his dissociative identity disorder (DID), led to Dent developing a split personality, the "Rat King", who seeks to purge Gotham of crime. Unaware of his alternate personality's actions, Dent works with Batman and Jim Gordon to uncover the Rat King's identity until he is inadvertently scarred by Irving "Matches" Malone. Batman eventually discovers that Dent was the Rat King before the latter is taken to receive treatment from Dr. Leslie Thompkins.

=== Other games ===
- A young Harvey Dent, based on the DCAU incarnation, appears in Batman: The Animated Series (1993).
- The Harvey Dent incarnation of Two-Face appears as a boss in The Adventures of Batman & Robin.
- The Harvey Dent incarnation of Two-Face, based on Tommy Lee Jones' portrayal, appears as a boss in Batman Forever.
- The Harvey Dent incarnation of Two-Face appears as the final boss of Batman: Chaos in Gotham.
- The Harvey Dent incarnation of Two-Face appears as the first boss in the Wii version of Batman: The Brave and the Bold – The Videogame, voiced again by James Remar.
- The Harvey Dent incarnation of Two-Face appears as a boss and playable character in DC Universe Online, voiced by Edwin Neal. In both the hero and villain campaigns, Two-Face will ask for the player's help in exposing the Penguin's smuggling operation so he can take it over for himself. In particular, he will manipulate the hero players into doing so by pretending to be Dent.
- The Harvey Dent incarnation of Two-Face makes a cameo appearance in Injustice: Gods Among Us via the Arkham Asylum stage and select S.T.A.R. Labs missions.
- The Harvey Dent incarnation of Two-Face appears in Batman: The Telltale Series, voiced by Travis Willingham. This version has been Gotham's district attorney for some time, is running for mayor against Hamilton Hill, with Wayne providing financial support, and is courting Selina Kyle. Amidst an attack by the Children of Arkham, Dent is exposed to a psychoactive agent while Hill is murdered. Batman and Catwoman intervene, though the former is eventually faced with the choice of either saving her or Dent. If the player chooses to save Catwoman, the Penguin disfigures Dent with a spotlight. Regardless of whether he is disfigured, Dent is sworn in as mayor, but develops an aggressive split personality called "Two-Face", who takes control after he catches Wayne in Kyle's apartment. Two-Face invokes martial law on Gotham and terrorizes its citizens during his efforts to defeat the Children of Arkham. Depending on further choices, Two-Face is either defeated by Batman while trying to seize Wayne Manor, then sent to Arkham Asylum, or Wayne during a hostage situation and sent to Blackgate Penitentiary.

== Merchandise ==
- Two-Face received a figure in Toy Biz's DC Comics Super Heroes toy line.
- The DCAU incarnation of Harvey Dent / Two-Face, based on his Batman: The Animated Series and The New Batman Adventures designs, were released in Kenner's tie-in toy lines.
- Two-Face received a figure in the Retro-Action DC Super Heroes line.
- Two-Face, based on his Lego Batman and Lego Batman 2 designs, received several Lego minifigs.
- The Batman Forever incarnation of Harvey Dent / Two-Face received figures in the film's tie-in toy line.
- The Dark Knight incarnation of Harvey Dent / Two-Face received figures in the film's tie-in toy line.
- The Dark Knight incarnation of Harvey Dent / Two-Face received a figure from Hot Toys.
- The Dark Knight incarnation of Harvey Dent / Two-Face received a bobblehead from an unknown manufacturer.
- Two-Face received a POP! vinyl figure from Funko. Additionally, a special ImPOPster Two-Face figure was also released.
- Two-Face received a mini-figure in DC Direct's Blammoids line.
- The Batman: Arkham incarnation of Harvey Dent / Two-Face, based on his Arkham City design, received a figure in Mattel's DC Universe Legacy Edition line as part of a two-pack with Batman.
- A Two-Face-inspired Hot Wheels car was released in 2012.
- Two-Face received several figures in Fisher-Price's Imaginext DC Super Friends line.
- A Two-Face Pez dispenser was released in 2008 on its own and as part of a Batman & Villain Giftset released the same year.

== Miscellaneous ==
- An original incarnation of Two-Face appears in Batman (1943). This version is an actor named Harvey Apollo, who becomes Two-Face while testifying against a criminal named Lucky Sheldon.
- The Harvey Dent incarnation of Two-Face appears in The Daily Batman! comic strip, in which he is scarred by an unnamed bystander who was aiming for the Joker.
- From 1999 to 2009, Vekoma made an Invertigo roller coaster in Six Flags America, called Two-Face: The Flip Side. However, the ride was closed and eventually removed due to repeated mechanical failures.
- A character based on Two-Face called No-Face appears in the Thumbs! short "Bat Thumb".
- The DCAU incarnation of Harvey Dent / Two-Face appears in The Batman Adventures. Dent is nearly cured of his split personality until the Joker convinces him that his fiancée, Grace Lamont, is cheating on him with Bruce Wayne. The "Two-Face" personality takes over and kidnaps Grace until Batman and Robin defeat him and send him back to Arkham. Following an unplanned breakout at Arkham, Two-Face is approached by the mastermind, Jonni Infantino, who threatens to hurt Grace if he does not provide information on Tony Hendra, a thug working for Rupert Thorne and one of Dent's last cases as district attorney before he became a supervillain. Dent reaches a payphone to warn Grace. After Batman and Robin defeat Infantino and his gang, Two-Face attempts to kill Infantino. In a later story, Two-Face takes a game show hostage to seek revenge on one of the contestants and Dent's father Lester, a gambling addict who brutalized him and Dent's mother whenever he lost. According to artist Ty Templeton, series writer Dan Slott had many ideas for Two-Face's stories for the series, but it was canceled before they could be realized.
- The Harvey Dent incarnation of Two-Face appears in Batman Black and White, voiced by John Fitzgerald.
- The DCAU incarnation of Harvey Dent appears in Batman Beyond (vol. 2) #2, having reformed and working to help pass a law preventing deceased villains from having public graves to prevent martyrdom.
- A character based on Two-Face called Radical Left appears in The Venture Bros.
- Two-Face, based on The Dark Knight incarnation, appears in CollegeHumor's Badman parody series, portrayed by Matt McCarthy. In a parody of the film's climax, Batman mistakenly believes Two-Face is three different people whenever Dent turns his head, greatly annoying him and Gordon's family.
- Two-Face appears in Holy Musical B@man!, portrayed by Chris Allen.
- Two-Face appears in the Injustice: Gods Among Us prequel comic. Following the Metropolis disaster and Superman's actions following this dividing the United States in half over those who agree with his actions or not, Two-Face hijacks a Gotham news channel to discuss his opinion on the matter until Superman overpowers him and the news station security guards defeat him. Two-Face is later sent to Arkham Asylum.
- Two-Face appears in Batman '66: The Lost Episode.
- The Batman (1989) incarnation of Harvey Dent appears in the tie-in comic series Batman '89, which sees him become Two-Face.
- Two-Face appears in Batman: The Audio Adventures, voiced by Ike Barinholtz.
