= Deal, Pennsylvania =

Unincorporated community in Pennsylvania, US

Coordinates: 39.761°N 78.931°W

Deal is an unincorporated community near Meyersdale in Somerset County, Pennsylvania, United States, 21 miles northwest of Cumberland, Maryland. Deal is situated at the top of the Allegheny Mountains near Mount Davis. A post office existed here in the 1880s.
