= Batman: Revolution =

2025 novel by John Jackson Miller

- Cover art
- Author: John Jackson Miller
- Audio read by: Will Damron
- Series: Batman
- Genres: Superhero
- Publisher: Penguin Random House
- Publication date: October 21, 2025
- Publication place: United States
- Media type: Print (hardcover), e-book, audiobook
- Pages: 544
- ISBN: 978-0593871935 (First edition hardcover)
- OCLC: 1518802439
- Dewey Decimal: 813.6
- LC Class: PS3613.I53858 B39 2025
- Preceded by: Batman: Resurrection

Batman: Revolution is an American superhero novel written by John Jackson Miller. The novel serves as a sequel to Batman: Resurrection and is set in Tim Burton's Batman film series, taking place in-between Batman (1989) and Batman Returns (1992). The novel introduces the characters of the Riddler and Killer Moth, and sets up the events of Batman '89: Echoes. It was released on October 21, 2025, by Penguin Random House.

== Plot ==
A few months after the defeat of Karlo Babić and Hugo Strange, with Independence Day approaching, business mogul Max Shreck proposes re-staging Gotham City's bicentennial celebration in the city's Patriot's Park. During his speech, in order to become part of Gotham's elite, Shreck attempts to present himself as a descendant of Konrad Straub, a hero from the Revolutionary War, but the letter he presents is exposed as a forgery by Norman Pinkus, damaging Shreck's credibility. Furthermore, Gotham is being plagued by a series of attacks by the Aeterna Militia revolutionary group, led by a woman named Camille, as well as serial killer William Matthew Stokowski/The Archer. Billionnaire Bruce Wayne, as Gotham's vigilante protector Batman, fails to foil Aeterna's attack on Wave Rock Financial in the city's financial district; he almost catches Camille, but he is stopped by a mysterious masked man in a flying suit of armor, Henri Armand.

Pinkus is revealed to be a copy boy at the Gotham Globe newspaper and the head of its Riddle Me This quiz section, and a frequent user of the Gotham City Police Department's emergency tip line to help solve their crimes, all the while using the pseudonym "Edward Nygma" to avoid persecution. His mother Martina disapproves of his double life, particularly stemming from when Pinkus identified Jack Napier and Joe Chill as the two muggers responsible for murdering Thomas and Martha Wayne when he was a child. Since then, Martina has grown severely ill from her time working as a cleaner at Axis Chemicals, and Dr. Takagi is refusing to admit her to the Smylex Ward at Gotham General Hospital since it is mainly for patients who survived the Joker's Smylex rampage. Defense attorney Roscoe Jenkins decides to represent Martina and her co-workers so that they may be able to afford private medical care instead. Pinkus accidentally foils this by leaving a clue in the newspaper revealing the location of Addison Fish, the accountant of deceased mob boss Carl Grissom. Batman captures Fish and provides Mayor Leo Borg and District Attorney Harvey Dent with the evidence necessary to seize Axis Chemicals as it was the last remaining asset owned by Grissom, derailing Jenkins's case. Around the same time that Pinkus provides another clue, Batman captures Stokowski and takes him into custody. In disguise as the "Bookworm", Pinkus arranges a meeting with Batman and proposes that they work together, but Batman declines Pinkus's offer, revealing that he actually caught Stokowski without his help, as Commissioner James Gordon did not pass his clues to him in order to follow identity protection protocol.

Pinkus loses his job at the Globe when the paper decides to make the Riddle Me This puzzle national and to avoid paying him royalties, and his mother dies in the hospital. Despondent, Pinkus returns to his makeshift apartment hidden in Gotham's old library, and finds a hidden passageway where he stumbles across the headquarters of Aeterna. Having previously met Camille under the alias "Elena" during a double date with Alexander Knox and Selina Kyle, Pinkus reveals his extensive knowledge about Gotham's past and how the different revolutionary groups share the same goal as the Servants of Freedom. Pinkus offers to join Aeterna and Camille accepts; the two gradually become lovers in the process. Despite Pinkus's disdain for violence, he partakes in Camille's plan to eliminate her rivals. He breaks Stokowski out of custody and traps Armand, demanding to know why he is stalking Camille. Armand claims that he only wants to see Gotham's system collapse and that Camille is his means, but both he and Stokowski join Aeterna, with Pinkus dubbing Armand as "Killer Moth".

As Pinkus plagues the city with riddles with the promise of hidden prizes under the alias of the "Riddler" to distract the public and cause chaos, Batman investigates the last sighting of Aeterna's conflict at Cleersky Aviation, and remembers visiting the factory as a boy with his parents and meeting the company's founder, Cameron Van Cleer, who killed himself after his newest prototype was apparently sabotaged and his assets seized by investors. During the unveiling of the police department's new Tactical Response Vehicles (TRVs), Aeterna ambush the parade and take Gotham's elite hostage, among them Bruce Wayne, Mayor Borg, Governor Hester Hodge, Harvey Dent, Max and Chip Shreck, and Shreck's partner Fred Atkins, who had inadvertently provided Camille with the parade plans during a dance in her "Elena" disguise. Bruce discreetly manages to reduce Aeterna's numbers via bat-drones, but Stokowski and Killer Moth destroy the rest of the drones and they are taken to Aeterna's base in a forest cave on the outskirts of the city. Pinkus notices Bruce and confronts him alone, revealing that he discovered the truth about Napier and Chill as a boy and sent a letter to the police, but no action was taken. Bruce also confronts Killer Moth in his workshop and realizes that he is actually Van Cleer, having faked his death in a failed attempt to provide his family with his life insurance money, though Van Cleer refuses to disclose why he is protecting Camille. After a scuffle, Bruce is able to free himself and makes his way through the tunnels to the Eastern Complex of the Batcave, where he had been previously working on a different exit route via the river. Meanwhile, Camille meets up with her contact from Corto Maltese to obtain her weaponry, but she sees that they are carrying Smylex powder and demands it too, leading to a gunfight where the smugglers are killed. Bruce suits up as Batman, knocks Van Cleer out, frees some of the hostages and pursues Camille and Pinkus.

On the Fourth of July, Pinkus organizes a celebration in the Patriot's Park with the bands paid for by Shreck. Unbeknownst to Pinkus, Camille secretly plans to fire rockets into the crowd and present signed confessions by Borg and Hodge to frame them for the attack, and also to unleash the Smylex into the city in gas form which may cover the entire country. Batman foils the rocket attacks; Stokowski falls to his death in the process. Camille attempts to flee, with Pinkus pursuing her to beg her not to kill the innocent citizens, but Van Cleer spots Atkins and recognizes him as the investor who sabotaged his business and destroyed his family, and flies off with him to the old library to torture and kill him. Camille and Pinkus arrive at the library, which has also been rigged with bombs, as does Batman. Batman disables Van Cleer's suit and frees Atkins. He also reveals that he knows why Van Cleer is protecting Camille; she is his long-lost daughter Emily. Feeling betrayed, Emily tries to shoot her father dead, but the bullets ricochet off his suit and wound Emily fatally instead. Van Cleer tries to fly Emily to a hospital but his suit malfunctions and explodes, killing them both. Batman also presents Pinkus with two letters he found in his bedroom; the letter he wrote for Gordon regarding Napier and Chill, and the other a farewell letter from Martina, who reveals that she did not post the letter to Gordon and who apologizes for holding him back for all his life. Pinkus works with Batman to get Emily's bombs out of the library and hook them to Batman's van; Batman drives the van and the bombs into the water where they explode harmlessly, but Pinkus suffers severe burn wounds in the process.

In the aftermath, Batman sends Pinkus to the hospital to recover as a John Doe. Pinkus is briefly taken before a recovered but incarcerated Hugo Strange and his new henchman Edward Nigel Maynard at Arkham Asylum, but Pinkus feigns insanity to avoid working with Strange, having previously helped Bruce deduce his true identity under his "Hugh Auslander" disguise. Batman gets a rehabilitated Babić to pose as the Riddler to get the bicentennial crowds to disperse and return home. Max and Chip Shreck have Atkins dismembered in a slaughterhouse and his remains thrown into the sewer, though Chip presents Max with schematics for the Batmobile, having found them in one of the TRVs. Borg decides not to run for mayor again, and Bruce persuades Jenkins to do so in his place. Bruce presents Pinkus's letter to Gordon, who reveals that Chill is already incarcerated, apparently having turned himself in long ago. Bruce later unveils the opening of Gotham's new Public Library named after Nathaniel Boyd, a Revolutionary War hero who once worked for his ancestor Silas Wayne. As Bruce sees the Bat-Signal, he discreetly leaves to answer it as Batman, but very briefly finds a stray black cat inside the rebuilt Batmobile.

== Characters ==
- Bruce Wayne/Batman: The vigilante protector of Gotham City. In Batman and Batman Returns, he is played by Michael Keaton.
- Alfred Pennyworth: Bruce's butler, confidant and father-figure. In the films, he is played by Michael Gough.
- Norman Pinkus: A Gotham Globe copy boy, the head of the paper's "Riddle Me This" puzzle section who goes by the pen name Edward Nygma, and a vigilante investigator/detective who sees himself as an intellectual rival to Batman. Pinkus is devoted to his ailing mother who formally worked at Axis Chemicals. He uses the alias The Bookworm when calling in tips to Gotham P.D. After a series of misfortunes, he becomes a criminal mastermind known as the Riddler and joins forces with the Aeterna Militia. In promotional artwork for the novel, he is modelled after late actor and comedian Robin Williams, who was considered to play the Riddler in Batman Forever while Tim Burton was attached as director.
- James Gordon: The commissioner of the Gotham City Police Department, now a secret ally of Batman's. In the films, he is portrayed by Pat Hingle.
- William Matthew Stokowski: A bitter cellist turned murderer who trades in his music bow for another. He comes to be known as The Archer.
- Emily Van Cleer: the leader of the Aeterna Militia revolutionary group and the long-lost daughter of Cameron Van Cleer/Killer Moth. She initially seeks out to prove that the weapons used in Corto Maltese originated from Gotham, or more specifically, the Armsgard research facility, which Hugo Strange beat her to destroying weeks earlier in Batman: Resurrection. Throughout the novel, she uses the aliases Camille, as a tribute to Camille Desmoulins, a prominent figure of the French Revolution, and Elena while she works at Shreck's Department store.
- Cameron Van Cleer: He has dedicated his life to protecting Camille with his powered armor for decades. He later calls himself Killer Moth, and is later revealed to be Camille's long-lost father, having faked his death so that his family would benefit from his life insurance policy.
- Leo Borg: the Mayor of Gotham City. In Batman, he is portrayed by Lee Wallace.
- Harvey Dent: The district attorney of Gotham City. In Batman, he is portrayed by Billy Dee Williams.
- Hester Hodge: A governor who arrives for Gotham's bicentennial and who Emily Van Cleer holds responsible for the conflict in Corto Maltese.
- Alexander Knox: A reporter for the Gotham Globe and close friend of Norman Pinkus. In Batman and the Arrowverse, he is played by Robert Wuhl.
- Hubert Coggins: the editor of the Gotham Globe who fires Norman Pinkus to avoid paying him royalties when Riddle Me This becomes national. He is partially based on two of Riddler's bosses in previous Batman media: Daniel Mockridge who fires him from the video game company Competitron to avoid paying him royalties for the "Riddle of the Minotaur" puzzle game in the episode "If You're So Smart, Why Aren't You Rich?" of Batman: The Animated Series; and Fred Stickley in Batman Forever who fires him from Wayne Enterprises for unethical experiments
- Martina Pinkus: Norman Pinkus's protective mother, now terminally-ill following a lifetime of working at Axis Chemicals. Her death serves as the catalyst for Norman becoming the Riddler
- Roscoe Jenkins: An attorney representing citizens against powerful companies such as Axis Chemicals. In Batman Returns, he is played by Michael Murphy.
- Max Shreck: A business mogul seeking to gain more power and influence over Gotham. In Batman Returns, he is played by Christopher Walken.
- Chip Shreck: Max Shreck's son and heir. In Batman Returns, he is played by Andrew Bryniarski.
- Fred Atkins: Max Shreck's sleazy, womanizing business partner.
- Selina Kyle: Shreck's timid secretary who becomes friends with Alexander Knox and Norman Pinkus. In Batman Returns, she is played by Michelle Pfeiffer.
- Barbara Gordon: Daughter of Commissioner James Gordon. Barbara is a detective-in-training. In the Batman '89 comic series she is modeled after actress Winona Ryder.
- Addison Fish: Accountant for the mob, specifically, the late Carl Grissom.
- Nick and Eddie: Muggers recently released from prison who are up to their old tricks. In Batman, they are played by Christopher Fairbank and George Roth respectively.
- Karlo Babić: a stage actor who goes by the name Basil Karlo and who was disfigured after being exposed to Smylex-laced products smuggled from Central City which give him the ability to shape his face and alter his voice to impersonate anyone. He was dubbed Clayface by the media. Having completed his rehabilitation and resumed his acting career, Batman briefly gets him to impersonate Norman Pinkus.
- Hugo Strange, an inmate at Arkham Asylum who previously manipulated Karlo Babić into doing his dirty work.
- Edward Nigel Maynard: an inmate of Arkham Asylum who idolizes Norman Pinkus and now secretly works for Hugo Strange. He later appears in the comic series Batman '89 as a possible successor to Pinkus in the persona of The Riddler. He is modeled after actor Martin Short.

== Background ==
In October 2024 it was revealed that Batman: Resurrection would be the first of a duology of novels; a sequel titled Batman: Revolution was later revealed by Miller with an October 21, 2025 release date.
