= Selina Kyle (Batman Returns) =

1989-1997 Batman film series character

- Burton's Batman character
- Michelle Pfeiffer as Catwoman
- First appearance: Batman Returns (1992)
- Based on: Catwoman by: Bill Finger; Bob Kane
- Adapted by: Tim Burton; Daniel Waters; Wesley Strick
- Portrayed by: Michelle Pfeiffer
- Voiced by: Clara Emanuel (Lego Batman: Legacy of the Dark Knight)

In-universe information
- Full name: Selina Kyle
- Species: Human
- Gender: Female
- Family: Unnamed mother
- Significant other: Bruce Wayne / Batman

Selina Kyle, also known as Catwoman, is a fictional character portrayed by Michelle Pfeiffer in Tim Burton's 1992 superhero film Batman Returns. Based on the DC Comics character of the same name, this version of Selina is initially depicted as a meek secretary and assistant of wealthy industrialist Max Shreck, who pushes her out of a window when she uncovers his corruption. Selina survives the fall and swears revenge against Shreck as Catwoman, which brings her into conflict with Batman. She forms an alliance with the Penguin to destroy Batman while beginning to date Bruce Wayne, unaware that he is Batman's alter ego. After discovering each other's secret identities, Selina ultimately rejects Bruce's plea to abandon her vengeance and kills Shreck before vanishing into the night.

Pfeiffer's performance received universal acclaim. Pfeiffer's portrayal of Catwoman is often considered to be the greatest portrayal of the character of all time as well as one of the finest performances of her career, though she regarded it as one of her most uncomfortable due to the inhibitions she suffered while wearing the costume during filming.

== Fictional character biography ==
Selina Kyle is the meek, much-abused assistant and secretary of wealthy industrialist Max Shreck (Christopher Walken). Her job is so demanding and thankless that the only companionship she has time for is her cat, Miss Kitty. She is also regularly sexually harassed by Shreck's son, Chip (Andrew Bryniarski).

When Shreck forgets his speech for a Christmas gala with the mayor (Michael Murphy), Selina rushes from the office to give it to him, only to be caught in the middle of an invasion by the Red Triangle Circus Gang. She is attacked by a homicidal clown, but Batman (Michael Keaton)- whom, unbeknownst to her, she had met earlier that day as his alter ego, billionaire playboy Bruce Wayne - saves her life.

She returns to the office, where she inadvertently uncovers Shreck's plot to build a power plant which would covertly siphon and hoard electricity from Gotham City. To keep her quiet, Shreck pushes her out of a window, but she survives thanks to fabric canopies breaking her fall, and she is awakened by a group of alley cats. When she returns home, she suffers a psychotic breakdown and vows to destroy Shreck, crafting a leather cat costume and robbing several of his department stores as the burglar/vigilante Catwoman.

She allies herself with the Penguin (Danny DeVito), which attracts Batman's attention. When she rejects the Penguin's sexual advances, however, he tries, unsuccessfully, to kill her. Meanwhile, Selina begins a relationship with Bruce Wayne, with neither knowing the other's secret identity. They eventually figure out each other's secret, however, and are unsure how their relationship will survive.

At the climax of the film, Catwoman tries to kill Shreck, who shoots her several times. Although badly wounded, she manages to kill Shreck by kissing him with a taser in her mouth while holding onto an exposed power cable. An explosion ensues, but afterwards, Batman finds only Shreck's charred corpse. As the Bat-signal later shines in the night sky, Catwoman is seen watching from afar.

== Other media ==
In 2004's Catwoman, Kyle's photograph is shown among those of former "Catwomen" viewed by Patience Phillips (Halle Berry) when visiting researcher Ophelia Powers (Frances Conroy).

In "Arrowverse" crossover, "Crisis on Infinite Earths", the setting of Batman and Batman Returns is established to take place on "Earth-89". The newspaper article read by an older Alexander Knox (Robert Wuhl) shows that Kyle later became publicly engaged to Bruce Wayne after reuniting with him.

In Birds of Prey (2002–2003) television series opening credits and main plot, Helena Kyle / Huntress (Ashley Scott) is shown to be the daughter of Keaton's Batman and Pfeiffer's Catwoman.

Selina Kyle appears in the sequel comic book Batman '89, reuniting with Bruce to defeat Harvey Dent, who has become Two-Face. She also appears in the sequel Batman 89: Echoes.

Selina Kyle appears in the 2024 novel, Batman: Resurrection, by John Jackson Miller, which is set between the events of Batman (1989) and Batman Returns (1992). In the novel, it is revealed that she encountered the Joker sometime during the events of the first film and has subsequently been traumatized, to the point that when the Joker apparently comes back to life, she barricades her apartment door and refuses to leave, unaware that the Joker is actually Karlo Babić in disguise. During a charity event, Vicki Vale and Alexander Knox claim to have once speculated that Selina was Max Shreck's wife or mistress.

Selina Kyle returns in the 2025 novel, Batman: Revolution. In it, Selina goes on a blind date with Norman Pinkus, who goes on to become the Riddler.

== Background ==
Pfeiffer's interpretation of the character is specifically influenced by the graphic novel Catwoman: Her Sister's Keeper, and derives heavily from the Pre-Crisis version of the character. In the film, she wears an all-black update of the character's traditionally green catsuit, and her facial appearance includes blonde hair and a cat-eared cowl that covers up part of her face, with the initial concept for the costume coming from Tim Burton, who envisioned a stuffed cat with its stitches coming apart at the seams.

Sam Hamm originally wrote a sequel script to the original Batman, which had Catwoman teaming up with The Penguin to go after hidden treasure, but screenwriter Daniel Waters reworked her characterization after Burton brought him in to pen a new screenplay for the film. Waters explained "Sam Hamm went back to the way comic books in general treat women, like fetishy sexual fantasy. I wanted to start off just at the lowest point in society, a very beaten down secretary." Catwoman killing Schreck with the taser kiss was originally written as her disfiguring Harvey Dent and turning him into Two-Face in early drafts of the script, but he was eventually deleted from the film.

According to Pfeiffer, who was previously reportedly considered to play Vicki Vale in the previous film but turned down, she felt devastated after Annette Bening was cast as Catwoman based on the strength of her performance in The Grifters, but Bening had to drop out of the film due to becoming pregnant. Sean Young, who was originally chosen for Vicki Vale in the previous film, believed the role should have gone to her, and she visited the production offices dressed in a homemade Catwoman costume, demanding to be considered.

Susan Sarandon, Meryl Streep (considered "too old" by Burton), Brooke Shields, Demi Moore, Nicole Kidman (who ended up playing Dr. Chase Meridian in Batman Forever), Jodie Foster,, Sigourney Weaver, Lena Olin, Raquel Welch, Cher, Ellen Barkin, Jennifer Jason Leigh, Lorraine Bracco, Jennifer Beals, and Bridget Fonda also either sought out or were considered for the role. Geena Davis, who worked before with Burton and Keaton in Beetlejuice, and singer Madonna turned down the role to star in A League of Their Own (1992). Burton was unfamiliar with Pfeiffer's work when she was suggested to him, but after one meeting was convinced that she would be perfect, and that she "could be both Selina Kyle and Catwoman" at the same time. Pfeiffer undertook kickboxing lessons for the role and trained for months with an expert to master the whip, and on the first day she accidentally cut her teacher's chin. Kathy Long, Pfeiffer's kickboxing coach, also served as her body double on the film.

More than 60 latex catsuits were created for the six-month shoot at $1,000 each. The initial concept for the design came from Burton, who envisioned a stuffed cat with its stitches coming apart at the seams. The costume was created around a body cast of Pfeiffer so that it would fit her exactly, and painted with white silicone rubber to imitate stitches. It was extremely tight and very laborious to put on – Pfeiffer had to be covered in talcum powder to squeeze into the costume, which was in turn brushed with liquid silicone on every take to give it shine. Pfeiffer would wear the suit for 12 to 14 hours at a time, except lunch breaks when it was removed, which was her only opportunity to use the bathroom during the workday.

== Reception ==
Audiences at test screenings responded positively to Michelle Pfeiffer's performance, and the studio wanted to make it clear Catwoman survived, so two weeks before release the final shot of her was added to the film. Pfeiffer received universal critical acclaim for her performance, and is consistently referred to as the greatest portrayal of Catwoman of all time by critics and fans. She is also considered one of the best villains in the Batman film franchise, ranking #2 in lists by The Ringer and The Mary Sue, and in first place by Variety. Janet Maslin described her performance as "captivating... fierce, seductive", while Peter Travers wrote in Rolling Stone "Pfeiffer gives this feminist avenger a tough core of intelligence and wit; she's a classic dazzler". Premiere retrospectively lauded her performance: "Arguably the outstanding villain of the Tim Burton era, Michelle Pfeiffer's deadly kitten with a whip brought sex to the normally neutered franchise. Her stitched-together, black patent leather costume, based on a sketch of Burton's, remains the character's most iconic look. And Michelle Pfeiffer overcomes Batman Returns' heavy-handed feminist dialogue to deliver a growling, fierce performance." In 2023, IGN ranked Catwoman as the 3rd greatest film supervillain of all time.

Todd McCarthy of Variety praised her performance: "Pfeiffer proves to be a very tasty Catwoman indeed." Entertainment Weekly's Owen Gleiberman wrote: "The runaway star here is Pfeiffer, whose performance is a sexy, comic triumph." Kenneth Turan of the Los Angeles Times praised Pfeiffer: "Michelle Pfeiffer’s stylish and funny performance as the frumpy Selina Kyle and her alter ego, the whip-cracking gender-bending Catwoman. The energy and pizazz Pfeiffer brings to the dual role is a pleasure." In 2023, Variety named Pfeiffer's Catwoman the second-greatest acting performance in a superhero film, arguing that it was deserving of an Academy Award nomination.

== Legacy ==
"After the traumas of Batman Returns she has amnesia, and she doesn't really remember why she has all these bullet holes in her body, so she goes to relax in Oasisburg. What Gotham City is to New York, Oasisburg is to Las Vegas-Los Angeles-Palm Springs. [It's a] resort area in the middle of the desert. It's run by superheroes, and the movie has great fun at making fun at the whole male superhero mythos. Then they end up being not very good at all deep down, and she's got to go back to that whole Catwoman thing."

— Daniel Waters on his script for Catwoman

With Warner Bros. moving on development for Batman Forever in June 1993 (a film which briefly referenced Catwoman in dialogue form), a Catwoman spin-off was announced. Michelle Pfeiffer was to reprise her role, with the character not to appear in Forever because of her own spin-off. Burton became attached as director, while producer Denise Di Novi and writer Daniel Waters also returned. In January 1994, Burton was unsure of his plans to direct Catwoman or an adaptation of "The Fall of the House of Usher".

On June 16, 1995, Waters turned in his Catwoman script to Warner Bros., the same day Batman Forever was released. Burton was still being courted to direct. Waters joked, "Turning it in the day Batman Forever opened may not have been my best logistical move, in that it's the celebration of the fun-for-the-whole-family Batman. Catwoman is definitely not a fun-for-the-whole-family script." In an August 1995 interview, Pfeiffer re-iterated her interest in the spin-off, but explained her priorities would be challenged as a mother and commitments to other projects.

In January 1999, writer John August pitched his script, where Selina Kyle leaves Gotham and goes to her hometown of Lake City. The film labored in development hell for years, with Pfeiffer replaced by Ashley Judd. The film ended up becoming the critically panned Catwoman (2004), starring Halle Berry as Patience Phillips, with Pfeiffer's Selina Kyle represented with a photograph of her alongside other "Catwomen".

In a 2021 interview with Screen Rant, Pfeiffer stated that she would be interested in reprising the role in The Flash, but that "no one's asked me yet".

For her role as Catwoman in 2022's The Batman, Zoë Kravitz has stated that Pfeiffer was one of her inspirations for the character. Berry and Anne Hathaway, who played Selina Kyle in The Dark Knight Rises, credited Pfieffer as an inspiration as well.

== See also ==
- Bruce Wayne (1989 film series character)
- Oswald Cobblepot (Batman Returns)
