= Batman '89 (comic book) =

DC Comics limited comic series

- Cover of Batman '89 #1 (August 2021)

Publication information
- Publisher: DC Comics
- Format: Limited series
- Genre: Superhero
- Publication date: August 2021 – July 2025
- No. of issues: 12
- Main characters: Batman; Robin; Harvey Dent; Batgirl; Catwoman; Harley Quinn; Scarecrow; Ra's al Ghul

Creative team
- Written by: Sam Hamm
- Penciller: Joe Quinones
- Letterer(s): Clayton Cowles; Carlos M. Mangual
- Colorist: Leonardo Ito
- Editor(s): Andrew Marino; Andy Khouri

Collected editions
- Shadows: ISBN 978-1779512680
- Echoes: ISBN 978-1799500773

Batman '89 is a superhero comic book limited series published by DC Comics that serves as a continuation of Tim Burton's two Batman films, Batman (1989) and Batman Returns (1992), which starred Michael Keaton as Bruce Wayne / Batman, ignoring the events of Batman Forever (1995) and Batman & Robin (1997). The series is written by the first two films' screenwriter, Sam Hamm, and illustrated by Joe Quinones. It was launched in August 2021 and ran for six issues.

A second series, Batman '89: Echoes, was announced by DC Comics on August 17, 2023, along with a November 28, 2023 release date, which also ran for six issues, with the first series retroactively titled Batman '89: Shadows.

== Plot summary ==
=== Shadows ===
Following the events of Batman Returns, a war breaks out in Gotham City between a gang of Joker-inspired criminals and a group of vigilantes dressed up as Batman. District attorney Harvey Dent vows to take down the real Batman, whom he holds responsible for inspiring these copycats, and to discredit police commissioner Jim Gordon. Dent is aided by his fiancée, Barbara Gordon, a GCPD sergeant and Gordon's daughter. He brings in the National Guard to the city and tries to lure Batman into a trap using the Bat-Signal with Lieutenant Harvey Bullock. While patrolling in Dent's childhood neighborhood, Burnside, Batman encounters another masked vigilante as he confronts a young thief who was trying to help his infant sister. The thief is killed by a stray bullet when Batman attempts to evade the soldiers, leaving Bruce racked with guilt.

The vigilante is a young man from Burnside named Drake Winston, who works as a mechanic at Royal Autobody, an auto shop owned by Dent's childhood mentor, Jerome Otis. After being criticized by the Burnside neighborhood council for the National Guard's actions, Dent makes a powerful televised speech denouncing the violence. Bruce meets with the council at Royal Autobody and offers to fund an education at Gotham University for all of Burnside's children. Shortly after the meeting, the shop is set ablaze by the Batman impersonators, who tracked Drake to the garage after he stopped them from robbing a store. Before he could fight them, Bruce finds that they have already been defeated by Catwoman.

Dent goes inside the burning building to find Drake, where he falls and is knocked unconscious near car batteries leaking sulfuric acid. He is rescued by Bruce and Drake, but is rushed to the hospital after the acid burned the left side of his face. Much to his dismay, Bruce is hailed as a hero by the press and finds out that Drake saw him confront the arsonists. At the hospital, Dent's subconscious (taking on the form of an alternate self where he rescued Drake and became governor) encourages him to think of the power in the choices he makes, inspiring him to mark one side of his two-headed coin. Later that night, Catwoman tells Batman she's back in Gotham to track down rich criminals and criticizes him for his lack of action against them as they prepare to stop more fires from the arsonists.

Dent begins displaying increasingly erratic behavior and relying on his coin to make most of his decisions. Barbara learns that he escaped the hospital while talking to Selina Kyle, who secretly scans her hard drive under the guise of helping her with a virus. Dent steals multiple files from the GCPD before retreating into the subway and sets up the abandoned Burnside station as his new base of operations. Meanwhile, Bruce invites Drake to meet him at Wayne Manor to discuss the arsonists. Prior to their meeting, Bruce learns that his great-grandfather acquired an automotive company owned by Drake's ancestors in a forced buyout. Drake goads Bruce into fighting him and deduces that he is Batman from his fighting style before revealing himself to be the masked vigilante. He proposes they form a partnership to combat the chaos brewing in the city.

As her father resigns as commissioner, Barbara receives a note from Dent telling her to meet him at the park. Dent hires a criminal informant connected to a high stakes case known as "The Lincoln Job" to recruit the various Joker gangs for an attack on the GCPD. They collapse four subway tunnels in close proximity to the GCPD headquarters and ambush the police outside. Batman helps Gordon fight the gang members inside while Drake takes out the snipers covering the streets. They eventually find Dent in the evidence room stealing a suitcase from the Lincoln Job after wounding Bullock. Dent manages to make Batman accidentally shoot Gordon with a knockout dart, allowing him to kidnap the commissioner while forcing Batman to stay behind to save Bullock.

The next day, Dent donates some of the stolen money to Burnside's residents. With Gordon's help, Batman and Drake locate Dent at the park meeting with Barbara. Barbara attempts to arrest Dent, but is knocked out by Catwoman, who encourages Batman and Drake to follow Dent while she takes care of the police and henchmen nearby. Distraught from Barbara's actions, Dent kills Gordon and blows up the station to critically injure Batman, discovering his secret identity in the process. Catwoman and Drake rescue Bruce and take him back to the Batcave for Alfred to tend to his wounds.

Selina tells Bruce that the Lincoln Job involved a financial company running federal aid funds through a string of mobbed-up front companies which resulted in millions in kickbacks for politicians. The suitcase Dent stole contains incriminating documents against them, giving him leverage over them. Dent orders all charges dropped against him and displays his dominance by killing mob boss Carmine Falcone. The next day, Dent murders Otis after the latter disowns him and frames Drake for the crime. He then drives to Wayne Manor and meets Bruce in the Batcave, attempting to blackmail Batman into becoming his enforcer. Bruce refuses and instead allows Dent to flip the coin to give him two options: kill Bruce, or allow him to help him reform. As Dent flips the coin, Catwoman cuts the giant penny hanging in the Batcave, which lands next to Dent and makes him fall to his death.

Bruce chastises Selina and claims he palmed Dent's coin so that it would've landed on the good side. Selina calls Bruce out for his rich upbringing and finds Dent had his own coin, questioning if he really did switch it. As she takes her cat and decides to leave him for good, Bruce finds out she placed a microphone in the cat's collar. Two days later, Bruce clears Drake's name from Otis' death and gives him access to the Batcycle. Drake tells Bruce he has an older sister who'd be willing to adopt the thief's younger sister and suggests sending her there instead of just setting her up with a $10 million trust fund so that she could grow up with a loving family. Barbara receives a package from the late Harvey that contains evidence revealing Batman's secret identity and a letter from Catwoman offering her partnership to incriminate Gotham's power elite. Later that night, Bruce decides on whether to go out on patrol or not by flipping a coin as the Bat-Signal shines in the sky.

=== Echoes ===
Batman has been missing in Gotham for two years after Dent's death. In his absence, Batman impersonators attempt to uphold the law and are killed by street criminals. Barbara Gordon, now Captain of the GCPD after taking down crooked politicians thanks to Catwoman's intel, is on the hunt for the real Batman. She made an agreement with Bruce not to prosecute him after learning her father had known Batman's secret identity and refused to disclose it provided he'd give up his vigilantism. In her investigations, she notices all the shooters have mental breakdowns at the sight of Batman's costume. She repeatedly contacts Bruce for help to no avail, leading to her visit Alfred at Wayne Manor.

Alfred reveals that Bruce disappeared a month prior and that he has no idea where he is. Meanwhile, Dr. Harleen Quinzel, a psychiatrist strongly interested with persona therapy and the late Joker, has a televised interview with the clown's mistress, Alicia Hunt, who had survived her apparent suicide attempt. However, her interview is cut short by her boss at ACN, Chuck, who instead airs a special news bulletin about an alleged bomber named Robert Lowery (a.k.a. Firefly) getting captured by a U.S. Marshall Team. Quinzel meets up with her coworker, Dr. Jonathan Crane, who announces that he will be treating Firefly. Firefly is actually an undercover Bruce, who is interested in speaking to Crane's mentor, Dr. Hugo Strange, who treated the real Lowery in the past.

Alfred reaches out to Drake for Bruce's whereabouts and deduces his connection to Firefly. Drake asks him to bring a fingerprint kit for Bruce. At Arkham Asylum, Crane performs a fear test on Bruce to determine if he's sane enough to stand trial. Bruce passes, but Crane has him stay in Arkham under the alias "Lewis Wilson" due to his celebrity status. Bruce quickly finds that Firefly has a bounty on him and talks with Edward Nigel Maynard, a sociopathic soldier who leaves behind riddles and member of a crew of criminal veterans called the "Strange Rangers". After interfering in a fight between Maynard and the guards, Bruce is taken by a guard named Rakim, who is one of Drake's confidants. As Crane monitors Bruce's actions, Quinzel requests to have a persona therapy session with him, having been tasked by Chuck to get a modern picture of Lowery at the promise of getting her own show. Crane refuses to have Quinzel get near Bruce, and she instead begins a session of persona therapy with the other inmates and has them all apply clown makeup on themselves.

Rakim takes Bruce to see Drake at the roof of the asylum, where Drake asks him why he let himself be arrested. Bruce informs him that he had been keeping tabs on Firefly's actions and found he was connected to the recently deceased Hugo Strange, who previously worked at Wayne Enterprises. Donning his costume for the first time in two years, he engages Firefly at his cabin, but upon seeing Batman and hearing about Strange, Lowery panics and commits suicide. Bruce then reads all of Lowery's letters and learned that one of Strange's colleagues had interfered with his work on the Strange Rangers. After reading all of the journals, he decided to disguise himself as Lowery and get committed to Arkham so he can find out more about Strange's death and his mysterious colleague. Drake gives him a tracking device to reach out if anything goes wrong.

When Bruce returns, Maynard informs him that there are only four Strange Rangers left, including them and a former super soldier named Mark Desmond aka Blockbuster. Quinzel coerces a guard into giving her security footage of Bruce that ACN shows on air. Barbara sees the footage and prepares to go to Wayne Manor to confront Alfred, but she is suddenly arrested by the FBI for abnormal activity in her bank account. Bruce is then taken back to Crane, who tells him Strange had developed a drug designed to cure post-traumatic stress disorder by inducing a new fear of Batman. However, there were dosage issues that led to most of the subjects suffering from psychotic breaks that had them repressing the memory of receiving the drug, but still retaining the fear. He then subjects Bruce to his fear gas, revealing he knew Bruce wasn't Lowery the whole time. Bruce has Rakim tell Drake to bring him some Nepentholene, a drug designed to prevent the brain from forming permanent memories, to help him overcome Crane's fear toxins.

The next day, Bruce learns from Maynard that Strange worked with a prisoner of war named Kashif for his cranial experiments while scoping out the Strange Rangers and that Kashif fell into a coma a day after Strange's death. As the federal investigators figure out Bruce isn't Lowery from his fingerprints, Crane closes up shop and injects Desmond with the fear toxin as he sends him to attend Quinzel's persona therapy with Bruce and Maynard. With Demond's trigger image being clowns and most of the inmates in clown makeup, he begins to wreak havoc. Bruce activates the tracking device to alert Drake and create an opening in the room before he and Maynard help Quinzel and the inmates evade Blockbuster. Bruce rummages through Crane's office and finds used vials of his fear formula while Maynard checks on Kashif and finds him still in a coma in the medical facility. As the cops and federal agents arrive at Arkham, Crane dons a scarecrow outfit and unleashes his fear toxins on them. Meanwhile, Drake arrives to help Bruce and Maynard escape and provides Bruce the Batsuit.

With the cops suffering from the fear toxins and a news team on the scene, Quinzel gets the idea to use the inmates to fake a hostage situation. She requests ACN to provide her five million dollars and calls Chuck to get it from the CEO, who admires her. Chuck instead lies to him that Quinzel's accused both of them of sexual assault and goes on air to refuse the payment. Enraged, Quinzel leads the inmates to escape and head towards ACN's headquarters. Bruce returns home to find Barbara and Alfred and recounts to them what he learned about Crane at Arkham. He takes Barbara to the Batcave to show where Dent died, and deduces that someone framed her with a fake bank account because she possesses the incriminating documents Dent stole. After Barbara reveals that the GCPD's cybersecurity company is Leaky Lines, Alfred quickly figures out the company's name is an anagram for Selina Kyle. While Bruce recreates Crane's formula, Alfred breaks down Maynard's riddle, which reveals that Crane used Blockbuster to murder Strange and that he's selling the fear toxin to foreign buyers affiliated with Kashif.

To prevent Crane from leaving the country, Bruce has Drake and his colleagues print out dozens of wanted posters of him to plaster across the city. Crane disguises himself as an HVAC repairman to set up his formula in the ACN's ventilation system and leaves behind a videotape before infecting the guard. One of Drake's friends working at the building's parking lot reports his license plate to him, allowing Batman to track him down. As the ACN prepares their nightly coverage, Quinzel arrives with her crew and takes Chuck hostage. The ACN nightly news broadcasts Crane's tape, where in his scarecrow attire, he claims to be Firefly and plans to feed on their fright. Right after the tape airs, the fear toxin is unleashed into the studio, sending the anchors and staff into a maniacal frenzy that results in several deaths. As Gotham watches the madness unfold, Batman ambushes Crane with his own fear toxin, putting the doctor on edge. Before Batman can apprehend him, the two are confronted by the foreign clients Crane was selling his formula to.

Batman evades the gunmen with Drake's help. Drake informs him that Kashif has woken up from his coma and escaped Arkham appearing significantly younger than before. Drake and his colleagues, called the Nightwings, fail to catch the buyers and Crane, but help Batman capture Kashif, known to his clients as the Demon, Ra's al Ghul. They negotiate with the buyers to exchange Ra's for Crane. Meanwhile, Chuck's attempts to negotiate with Quinzel fall on deaf ears, as she is inspired by her previous client, Catwoman, to embrace her new identity as Harley Quinn. After someone stops a sniper from taking out Quinn, Chuck attempts to escape to the lower levels, but commits suicide after inhaling the fear toxin. Quinn finds the one who rescued her was Catwoman, who offers to help train her for her new criminal lifestyle.

After the Nightwings take Crane in the hostage exchange, Ra's offers to share the fear toxin with Batman, but Bruce refuses to let anyone have it and consumes three pills. Alfred reveals they are drugs that remove his ability to feel fear and pain, which he intended to use as a last resort. Determined to bring Bruce back, Drake and Barbara, now in her own Batsuit, take the Batwing to Ra's' ship as Batman destroys the fear toxin supplies and fights relentlessly against the henchmen. Drake cures him of his maniacal state and helps him escape while Barbara converts the Batwing into a car and lands on the highway. At Royal Autobody, Drake finds that Crane has taken Rakim hostage. However, upon seeing Barbara in the Batsuit, Crane loses control and gouges his own eyes out. Four weeks later, Crane has been committed to Arkham Asylum, where he still has nightmares about Batman and his allies. He is confronted in his cell by Quinn, who has killed most of the staff and prepares to murder him.

== Characters ==
=== Introduced in Shadows ===
- Bruce Wayne/Batman: a billionnaire philanthropist who has taken it upon himself to fight crime as the vigilante Batman after his parents were murdered. In Batman and Batman Returns, he is played by Michael Keaton.
- Alfred Pennyworth: Bruce's butler, confidant and father-figure. In the films, he is played by Michael Gough.
- James Gordon: the commissioner of the Gotham City Police Department, now a secret ally of Batman's. In the films, he is portrayed by Pat Hingle, though his design has been slightly altered to resemble his appearance in the comics.
- Harvey Dent: the district attorney of Gotham City, now engaged to James Gordon's daughter Barbara. After an accident that disfigures half of his face, he is driven insane and becomes the supervillain Two-Face. In Batman, his pre-criminal self is portrayed by Billy Dee Williams, who was slated to reprise the role and fully become Two-Face in Batman Forever, while Michael Keaton was still attached to play Batman, before being recast with Tommy Lee Jones.
- Selina Kyle/Catwoman: the former secretary of business mogul Max Shreck whom she previously murdered before fleeing Gotham City. She has since returned for her own motivations. In Batman Returns, she is played by Michelle Pfeiffer.
- Drake Winston: a mechanic working in the Burnside neighborhood of Gotham City who becomes the vigilante Robin and an ally of Batman. He is modeled after Marlon Wayans, who was Tim Burton's original choice to play Robin in Batman Forever while Michael Keaton was still attached to play Batman.
- Barbara Gordon: the daughter of James Gordon who works with the GCPD, investigating Batman's activities after his battles with the Joker and the Penguin. She later becomes the vigilante Batgirl. She is modeled after Winona Ryder.
- Jerome Otis: the owner of the Royal Autobody garage in Burnside, the employer of Drake Winston and Dent's childhood mentor.
- Harvey Bullock: a detective working for the GCPD. He is modeled after his design in Batman: The Animated Series.

=== Introduced in Echoes ===
- Dr. Harleen Quinzel: a psychiatrist working at Arkham Asylum with a personal interest in the Joker's crimes. She is modeled after Madonna, who was Joel Schumacher's original choice to play Harley in his unproduced film Batman Unchained.
- Dr. Jonathan Crane: a doctor working at Arkham specializing in phobias and the former protégé of Hugo Strange. He is modeled after Jeff Goldblum, who was considered to play him in Batman Unchained.
- Alicia Hunt: the former mistress of Jack Napier, driven insane by his Smylex experiments. In Batman, she is played by Jerry Hall.
- Edward Nigel Maynard: a member of the Strange Rangers with a tendency to leave riddles as a calling card, similar to Norman Pinkus. He is modeled after Martin Short.
- Ra's al Ghul: an enigmatic man who goes by the name Kashif that worked together with Strange to develop the fear toxin and is known to his associates as "The Demon". He is modeled after actor Ricardo Montalbán.
- Chuck Lantz: the station manager at ACN, who communicates with Harley Quinn regularly for her show. He is modeled after Harvey Fierstein.
- Mark Desmond: a member of the Strange Rangers who is very large and powerful, who is manipulated by Dr. Crane. He is modeled after Arnold Schwarzenegger, who portrayed Mr. Freeze in Batman & Robin, which this series ignores.
- Hugo Strange: a former doctor at Arkham who mentored Dr. Crane. He is modeled after Christopher Lee.

== Development ==
After the success of the Batman '66 comic book series, comic book artist Joe Quinones revealed in March 2016 that he and Kate Leth had pitched a Batman comic book series set in the world of Tim Burton's Batman universe to DC Comics in 2015. He also revealed the concept art they had submitted. The book would have picked up after the events of 1992's Batman Returns. Quinones said about the inclusion of the characters in the comic: "We would have seen the return of Selina Kyle/Catwoman as well as introductions to 'Burton-verse' versions of Robin (designed to be portrayed by Marlon Wayans), Barbara Gordon (designed to be portrayed by Winona Ryder), Harley Quinn and Poison Ivy (the latter designed to be portrayed by Geena Davis). It also would have showcased the turn of Billy Dee Williams' Harvey Dent into Two-Face". The pitch was initially rejected by DC. In 2019, DC's Chief Creative Officer and publisher at DC, Jim Lee, acknowledged that many artists and writers had proposed a comic book series set in the Burton-verse over the years and that the book being made in the future wasn't out of the realm of possibility.

In February 2021, DC announced to release a comic book continuation of Batman Returns entitled Batman '89, ignoring the subsequent films Batman Forever (1995) and Batman & Robin (1997), in which actor Michael Keaton did not appear following Burton's departure from the franchise. DC further revealed that the series would be written by Sam Hamm and illustrated by Quinones, and would include the return of Catwoman (Michelle Pfeiffer) while also introducing a new version of Robin named Drake Winston (whose appearance is inspired by Marlon Wayans, who was originally attached to play the role in the Burton films) and showing the transformation of Billy Dee Williams' Harvey Dent into Two-Face. In response to a question as to whether the Joel Schumacher Batman films are canon to the world of Batman '89, Hamm responded that the Schumacher films take place on the alternate universe of "Earth-97" as opposed to Batman '89's "Earth-89". Joe Quinones revealed that the story "loosely takes place in the mid-nineties".

A second series was announced by DC Comics on August 17, 2023. The first issue of the new series was released on November 28, 2023. It will be penned, once again, by Sam Hamm, with art by Joe Quinones. In the series, Batman has mysteriously disappeared after Dent's death, leading Gotham citizens to take to the streets to fight in his place, including Barbara Gordon, who becomes Batgirl. Scarecrow (designed to be portrayed by Jeff Goldblum) and Harley Quinn (designed to be portrayed by Madonna) are featured as the main antagonists, referencing the unproduced fifth film in the Burton/Schumacher series, Batman Unchained.

== Publications ==
Batman '89 was published by DC Comics beginning on August 10, 2021. Batman '89: Echoes was published by DC Comics beginning on November 28, 2023.

=== Issues ===
Title	Issue	Title	Publication date	Ref.
Batman '89	#1	"Shadows, Chapter One"	August 10, 2021	
Batman '89	#2	"Shadows, Chapter Two"	September 14, 2021	
Batman '89	#3	"Shadows, Chapter Three"	October 12, 2021	
Batman '89	#4	"Shadows, Chapter Four"	December 7, 2021	
Batman '89	#5	"Shadows, Chapter Five"	April 12, 2022	
Batman '89	#6	"Shadows, Chapter Six"	July 5, 2022	

Title	Issue	Title	Publication date	Ref.
Batman '89: Echoes	#1	"Echoes, Chapter One"	November 28, 2023	
Batman '89: Echoes	#2	"Echoes, Chapter Two"	March 19, 2024	
Batman '89: Echoes	#3	"Echoes, Chapter Three"	July 10, 2024	
Batman '89: Echoes	#4	"Echoes, Chapter Four"	September 11, 2024	
Batman '89: Echoes	#5	"Echoes, Chapter Five"	December 18, 2024	
Batman '89: Echoes	#6	"Echoes, Chapter Six"	July 2, 2025	

=== Collected editions ===
Title	Material collected	Publisher	Region	Released dates	ISBN
Batman '89	Shadows #1-6	DC Comics	US	August 30, 2022	978-1779512680
Batman '89: Echoes	Echoes #1-6	DC Comics	US	October 7, 2025	978-1799500773

- Batman '89 (ISBN 978-1779512680), DC Comics, 2022.
- Batman '89: Echoes (ISBN 978-1799500773), DC Comics, 2025.

== Reception ==
Batman '89 received critical acclaim, scoring an average rating of 8.3 for the entire series based on 71 critic reviews aggregated by ComicBookRoundup.com.

Syfy Wire's Matthew Jackson wrote: "This is more than a tribute. It's a bold reimagining and a killer exercise in worldbuilding on Hamm's part, bolstered by Quinones' pitch perfect art". Toussaint Egan of Polygon praised the book's "multifaceted depiction of people of color". John Saavedra of Den of Geek stated: "[I]ssue one is a promising start for a modern reinvention of the Burtonverse". Bleeding Cool dubbed the book "pitch perfect", rating it 8.5 out of 10; it also topped the site's Bestseller List. Screen Rant stated that Batman '89 proves that casting actor Tommy Lee Jones as Two-Face (in 1995's Batman Forever) was "a mistake".

Batman '89: Echoes #1 was well/received by critics, with Comic Book Resources's Tim Rooney stating, "If the first Batman '89 volume was a love letter to the original movies, this series feels more like an evolution". ComicBook.com gave the first issue 4 out of 5 stars, saying, "Quinones' tight linework and framing, and Ito's blue-purple color palette imbue it onto every page of this issue. With its unexpected ending, Batman '89: Echoes #1 is a thrilling return to a fan-favorite era". The series conclusion was met with more mixed reviews, with criticism aimed for the amount of plot points and characters introduced in last few issues and the several delays the final issue experienced. Jonathan Waugh of AIPT Comics wrote, "With delays even worse than its predecessor, Batman '89, Echoes' final issue tries to bring everything in for a solid conclusion, but it feels too little, too late, and is only compounded by the fact that the previous issue came out in December of last year."

== See also ==
- Batman: Resurrection
- Batman: Revolution
- Batman '66
- Wonder Woman '77
- Superman '78
