= Vicki Vale =

Fictional character

- Vicki Vale as she appeared on a panel of Bruce Wayne: The Road Home: Batman & Robin #1 (October 2010). Art by Cliff Richards.

Publication information
- Publisher: DC Comics
- First appearance: Batman #49 (October 1948)
- Created by: Bill Finger (writer); Bob Kane (artist); Lew Schwartz (Illustrator)

In-story information
- Full name: Victoria Vale
- Supporting character of: Batman

Victoria Vale (usually called "Vicki") is a fictional character appearing in American comic books published by DC Comics, commonly in association with the superhero Batman. Her character often serves as a potential love interest, character in peril, and source for information about crimes being committed, often drawing parallels to Lois Lane from the Superman comics.

Vicki Vale has appeared in several DC Comics-related media, such as the films Batman and Robin (1949) (portrayed by Jane Adams), Batman (1989) (portrayed by Kim Basinger) and The Batman vs. Dracula (voiced by Tara Strong) as well as the Batman: Arkham video game franchise (voiced by Grey DeLisle).

== Origins ==
While Batman co-creator Bob Kane was at Columbia Pictures for a development meeting concerning the upcoming Batman and Robin (1949) serial, he by chance met a young starlet in the studio commissary who inspired the Vicki Vale character, a young Marilyn Monroe who was at the studio at that time filming the movie Ladies of the Chorus (1948). Vicki Vale, Lois Lane, and Marilyn Monroe each have first and last names beginning with the same letter. The character was then fleshed out and developed for the serial by Bob Kane and Bill Finger. To prepare the public for her serial appearance in advance, the character was debuted in Batman #49 (October 1948). Vicki Vale is a journalist, usually based in Gotham City, who has worked for a number of publications across various iterations of the character and the surrounding DC universe. She is frequently depicted as a romantic interest of Bruce Wayne, the alter-ego of Batman.

== Publication history ==
Vicki Vale first appeared in Batman #49 (Oct. 1948), written by Bill Finger with art by Bob Kane and Lew Schwartz.

== Fictional character biography ==
=== 1940s–1960s ===
Vicki Vale's early appearances revolved around her suspicions that Batman and Bruce Wayne were the same person. Batman would usually manage to fool her by the end of each story into concluding that he was not really Bruce Wayne, but her suspicions would re-emerge in a later story.

The first appearance of Vicki Vale in Batman #49 (Oct. 1948); art by Dick Sprang.

Vicki Vale remained a prominent character in Batman stories from Batman #49, in 1948, until Detective #320 in October 1963. In 1964, Julius Schwartz became the editor of the Batman-related comics. Schwartz dropped a number of Batman's Silver Age backing characters, including Vicki Vale, Batwoman, Bat-Girl, Bat-Mite, and Ace the Bat-Hound.

=== 1970s–1980s ===
Vicki Vale surfaced 13 years later, in Batman Family #11 (June 1977). She was now married and known as Vicki Vale Powers. She was also mentioned in Batman Family #16. After that, she vanished for another five years.

She returned in February 1982 in Batman #344. The editor and writer were apparently unaware of her 1970s appearances, so there was no mention of her marriage, and it was stated in a footnote that she had not appeared since Detective #320. She had supposedly been in Europe for years, but now had returned to Gotham City. She became Bruce Wayne's romantic interest again, earning the wrath of Catwoman in Batman #355 (January 1983). She also had a rivalry for Bruce's affections with Julia Remarque, the daughter of Alfred Pennyworth and Mademoiselle Marie (Julia Remarque was wiped from continuity after Crisis on Infinite Earths).

=== 1980s–2010 ===
Vale disappeared from the comics soon after Crisis on Infinite Earths, but in Frank Miller's Batman: Year One, she is a gossip reporter who flirts with the judge during a shoplifting trial. Vale returned in 1989 and 1990 in the Grant/Breyfogle era to coincide with release of Tim Burton's Batman. She once again began a romantic relationship with Bruce Wayne, but became upset over his frequent absences. At one point, she was partnered with photojournalist Horten Spence to investigate the Fever phenomenon. This led to the two of them having an encounter with the Street Demonz as Horten fought them off. When hospitalized after an attack by the Ventriloquist, Wayne struggled over whether or not to tell her he was Batman, but decided not to, which led to the end of their relationship. Wayne later regreted this when he descended into a brief depression after his defeat at the hands of Bane.

Vale appeared again in the Wonder Woman title as one of the hosts of the television program The Scene (similar to The View). Her co-hosts included Lia Briggs, Tawny Young, and Linda Park. Two episodes are shown in which they interview Wonder Woman on her career. In the "Black Glove" book, she brusquely offers best wishes to Bruce and his new lady Jezebel Jet on the air.

Vale appeared (with blonde hair) in the 2008 two-part story Two-Face: Year One. She interviewed a corrupt mob lawyer named Weinstein, who was running for Gotham district attorney against Harvey Dent. She was present when Dent, now the disfigured gangster Two-Face, confronted Weinstein and Wayne at a party in Wayne Manor.

In the 2009 Batman: Battle for the Cowl storyline, the crossover miniseries Gotham Gazette has Vicki claiming to have discovered Batman's identity. Vicki has returned to the Gotham Gazette after her TV career failed. While the general public is more interested in what happened to Batman, Vale wants to know what happened to Bruce Wayne, who was last "seen" in Vietnam (which was actually Hush masquerading as Wayne). Vicki speaks with Lucius Fox, but still cannot get a proper answer about Bruce's whereabouts. Feeling like "a real reporter" again, she is thrilled when she receives an invitation to join Bruce as his date at the Robinson Ball. In Battle for the Cowl #3, Vicki reports on the chaos that has been caused by Two-Face in the wake of Batman's disappearance.

In the next issue of Gotham Gazette titled "Batman Alive", Vicki sees that Bruce is not present at the gala. While there, she observes the tension between Dick Grayson and Barbara Gordon, as well as the scarring on Tim Drake, allowing her to discover the double lives they and Bruce have been leading. At the end of the story she is seen arranging pictures on her wall, connecting various members of the Batman Family to their secret identities, and declaring that she will prove her suspicions.

Vicki becomes an important supporting player in Red Robin #6. In that issue she begins asking questions and is met by Bruce Wayne (actually Hush/Thomas Elliot in disguise). He agrees to an interview/date with her. This happens in Red Robin #9, where Wayne/Elliot avoids questions. Vicki finally gets her proof in Batman #703.

In Bruce Wayne: The Road Home, before she publishes Bruce's secret, Vicki wants to know how and why he is Batman. She calls Wayne Manor and threatens to publish the article if Bruce does not meet with her to discuss it. Alfred sends the still-masquerading Thomas Elliot to meet with her. He tells Vicki before kissing her that he is not Batman. When she gets home, she realizes that he was not Bruce Wayne, and knowing that Dick Grayson is now in the role of Batman leads her to ask the question, "Where is Bruce Wayne?" Holding the story until she uncovers the truth behind that, Vicki goes to Wayne Manor and tells Alfred that she knows the truth. Alfred tells her that Bruce, who was feared dead, has returned, but has not told everyone yet. While holding the story, she encounters Barbara Gordon and tells her she knows the truth. She asks her ex-boyfriend, Jack Ryder, if she should publish the article and turn her career around. Vicki sets up a sting with Commissioner Gordon but things do not go as planned, which leads to Catwoman's finding out that she knows not just about the Bat-family, but also the Gotham Underground, especially Catwoman. Vicki is eventually hunted by the League of Assassins, after Ra's al Ghul realizes that she knew Batman's secret. However, Bruce eventually rescues her. She promises him that she will never reveals his secrets. Vicki realizes that Bruce's mission is bigger than the truth she's seeking, and decides not to expose his secrets, and becomes his ally. During the conflict, Ra's realizes that Vicki is a descendant of Marcel "The Hammer" du Valliere, a French soldier and one of the few who challenged Ra's and his warriors centuries before Batman. Ra's claims that du Valliere stole the woman (who was also Vicki's ancestor) he attempted to court. Despite having killed du Valliere after their final battle a long time ago, it is implied that al Ghul's business with Vicki is not complete as he vows to track down anything that related to his enemies.

In Batman and Robin #18, another ex-Wayne Girl, now a villain called The Absence, comes looking to rip out Vicki's eyes. In the following issue, Batman and Robin rush to her apartment only for Absence to reveal that Vicki is bound and gagged inside of a cabinet. Absence then explains that she never intended to kill Vicki, but that she used her as bait to lure Batman into a trap.

=== The New 52 ===
After the Crime Syndicate of America's invasion of Earth, Vicki Vale begins investigating organized crime in Gotham. She is rescued by Harper Row when thugs attack her and her assistant in the Gotham Narrows. Harper berates Vicki for not knowing the type of territory she is venturing into. Vicki further investigates the Crime Syndicate's connection to police corruption with the assistance of Jason Bard, Harvey Bullock and Maggie Sawyer. Vicki later begins dating Bard, until her research reveals that Bard has a vendetta against vigilantes ever since an amateur Batman wannabe in Detroit led to the death of Jodie Hawkins, his partner/lover, this event leaving Bard with a hatred of Jim Gordon as he felt that a decent cop would not need Batman to help his city. Forced to acknowledge how far he has fallen, Bard resigns his police position.

== Other versions ==
- Victoria Vale appears in the Elseworlds title Batman: Holy Terror as a broadcast news anchor.
- Vicki Vale appears in All Star Batman & Robin, the Boy Wonder by Frank Miller and Jim Lee.
- Vicki Vale appears in Justice as a reporter.
- An alternate timeline version of Vicki Vale appears in the Flashpoint tie-in Flashpoint: Wonder Woman and the Furies as a television reporter.

== Reception ==
Vicki Vale was listed at #3 in Comicbook.com's 2012 article, "Great Comic Book Journalists: Who's the Best of the Best?", #8 in CBR.com's list of the "15 Best Comic Book Journalists" and #11 in ScreenRant.com's list of "The 15 Most Powerful Journalists In Comic Book History". The character was ranked 93rd in Comics Buyer's Guide's "100 Sexiest Women in Comics" list.

== In other media ==
=== Television ===
- Vicki Vale appears in Batman: The Brave and the Bold, voiced by Gabrielle Carteris.
  - Additionally, a series original character based on Vale and Lois Lane named Vilsi Vaylar (voiced by Dana Delany) appears in the episode "The Super-Batman of Planet X!" as the love interest for the Batman of Zur-En-Arrh who works at the Solar Cycle Globe.
- Vicki Vale, based on the Batman (1989) incarnation (see below), appears in the "Batman" OnStar commercial "Very Late", portrayed by Brooke Burns.
- Vicki Vale's aunt and series original character Valerie Vale appears in Gotham, portrayed by Jamie Chung. Similarly to Vicki, Valerie is also a reporter who pursues a brief romance with Jim Gordon.
- Vicki Vale makes a cameo appearance in the DC Super Hero Girls episode "#TweenTitans" as a cast member for Bruce Wayne's reality television series Make It Wayne.
- Vicki Vale appears in My Adventures with Superman, voiced by Andromeda Dunker. This version is a college friend of Perry White; an underhanded award-winning columnist, later editor-in-chief, for the Gotham Gazette; and Lois Lane's idol, later rival.
- The Merry Little Batman incarnation of Vicki Vale (see below) appears in Bat-Fam, voiced again by Cynthia McWilliams.

=== Film ===
Kim Basinger as Vicki Vale (right), with Michael Keaton as Batman, in Batman (1989).

- Vicki Vale appears in Batman and Robin (1949), portrayed by Jane Adams.
- Vicki Vale appears in Batman (1989), portrayed by Kim Basinger. Sean Young was originally cast in the role before being forced to bow out due to an injury from a horse-riding scene that was ultimately cut from the film. This version is a photojournalist. After coming to Gotham City to investigate "Batman" sightings, she becomes romantically involved with Bruce Wayne, initially unaware that he is Batman, and drawn into a conflict with the Joker after he becomes obsessed with her.
  - In an early script for the sequel Batman Returns, written by Sam Hamm, Vale was meant to return, with Basinger reprising the role. However, the script and Vale's appearance were scrapped, with the final script making reference to Vale breaking up with Wayne because she ultimately could not accept his dual life.
- Vicki Vale appears in The Batman vs. Dracula, voiced by Tara Strong. This version is a television reporter whom Dracula attempts to use to resurrect his long-dead bride Carmilla.
- Vicki Vale appears in Superman/Batman: Apocalypse, voiced by an uncredited Andrea Romano.
- Vicki Vale appears in Batman: Year One, voiced by an uncredited Grey DeLisle.
- Vicki Vale, based on the Batman (1989) incarnation, makes a cameo appearance in The Lego Batman Movie.
- Vicki Vale appears in Merry Little Batman, voiced by Cynthia McWilliams.

=== Video games ===
- Vicki Vale appears in DC Universe Online, voiced by Lorrie Singer.
- Vicki Vale appears in Lego Batman 2: DC Super Heroes, voiced by Anna Vocino. This version is a news anchor for Gotham Channel News (GCN) who strives to comfort viewers with lighthearted versions of the news she is covering.
- Victoria "Vicki" Vale appears in Batman: The Telltale Series, voiced by Erin Yvette. This version is a descendant of the Arkham family, the founders of Arkham Asylum, until her family was killed by Thomas Wayne and she was adopted by the Vales, who abused and tortured her. Vowing revenge on the Waynes and Gotham City, Vale reforms a political group called the Children of Arkham as a terrorist group and secretly leads them on a crusade against Gotham's elite as Lady Arkham (voiced by Steve Blum). Additionally, she uses her civilian identity to help engineer a chemical that strips victims of their moral filters, gains Bruce Wayne's trust before using the chemical to have him committed to Arkham, murders her adoptive family as revenge for everything that they did to her, and kidnaps Alfred Pennyworth. Once Bruce arranges for his release however, he and the GCPD foil the Children of Arkham's plans. While being chased through the old asylum's ruins and depending on the player's choices, Vale rips out one of Pennyworth's eyes or may learn Bruce is Batman before she is seemingly killed by falling debris while attempting to escape, though her body is never found.
- Vicki Vale makes a cameo appearance as a non-player character (NPC) in Lego Batman: Legacy of the Dark Knight.

==== Batman Arkham ====
Vicki Vale appears in the Batman: Arkham series, voiced by Grey DeLisle in the main series, Jules de Jongh in Batman: Arkham VR, and Ali Hillis in Batman: Arkham Shadow. This version is a reporter for Gotham News Network (GNN).

=== Miscellaneous ===
- Tracks referencing the Batman (1989) incarnation of Vicki Vale entitled "Vicki Waiting" and "Batdance (Vicki Vale Mix)" appear in the film's soundtrack.
- Vicki Vale makes a cameo appearance in The Batman Strikes! #15.
- The Batman (1989) incarnation of Vicki Vale appears in Batman: Resurrection.
