= Bruce Wayne (1989 film series character) =

1989 Batman film series character

- Burton and Schumacher's Batman and DC Extended Universe character
- Michael Keaton as Bruce Wayne / Batman in Batman Returns (1992)
- First appearance: Batman (1989)
- Last appearance: The Flash (2023)
- Based on: Batman by: Bob Kane; Bill Finger
- Adapted by: Sam Hamm; Warren Skaaren
- Portrayed by: Michael Keaton (Batman, Batman Returns, The Flash); Val Kilmer (Batman Forever); George Clooney (Batman & Robin, The Flash)

In-universe information
- Alias: Batman
- Occupation: Philanthropist; Vigilante
- Family: Thomas Wayne (father); Martha Wayne (mother); Alfred Pennyworth (surrogate father)
- Significant others: Vicki Vale; Selina Kyle; Chase Meridian; Julie Madison
- Children: Dick Grayson (surrogate son)
- Home: Wayne Manor, Gotham City
- Abilities: Genius-level intellect; Expert detective; Master martial artist and hand-to-hand combatant; Master tactician, strategist, and field commander; Peak human physical and mental condition; Mastery of stealth and espionage; Utilizes high-tech equipment and weapons; Money / Riches

Bruce Wayne, better known by his vigilante superhero alias Batman, is a fictional character who is featured as the main protagonist in Warner Bros.' initial Batman film series (1989–1997), and later as a supporting character in the DC Extended Universe (DCEU) film The Flash (2023). Based on the DC Comics character of the same name, he was portrayed by Michael Keaton in Tim Burton's Batman (1989) and Batman Returns (1992), before being recast with Val Kilmer and George Clooney in Joel Schumacher's Batman Forever (1995) and Batman & Robin (1997) respectively. Both Keaton and Clooney reprised their roles in The Flash, which retroactively incorporates versions of them into two alternate timelines of the DCEU's continuity. Keaton's portrayal of the character was critically acclaimed and influenced subsequent interpretations.

== Fictional character biography ==
=== Tim Burton films ===
==== Early life ====
As a child, Wayne went to see the musical film Footlight Frenzy with his parents, Thomas and Martha, at the Monarch Theatre. As the Waynes walked down an alley, Thomas and Martha were shot and killed by a mugger. The mugger prepared to kill Bruce, as well, asking the boy, "Have you ever danced with the devil in the pale moonlight?"; the mugger's accomplice entreats him to run from the police, however, so he spares Bruce's life. After this, he was raised by Alfred Pennyworth (Michael Gough), the family butler.

==== Becoming Batman ====
After decades of training, Wayne, who inherited his parents' wealth after their deaths, had his company Wayne Enterprises purchase equipment and built an advanced combat suit and the Batcave, a secret sophisticated lair under Wayne Manor, and began fighting crime in Gotham City as Batman (Keaton), who quickly becomes an urban legend that strikes fear in the hearts of Gotham's criminal element, especially after the death of gangster Johnny Gobbs, whose body was found drained of blood following an altercation with the vigilante. Publicly, Wayne poses as an eccentric playboy, throwing lavish fundraisers for the city and collecting rare art from around the world.

Wayne hosts a fundraiser at Wayne Manor to help fund Gotham City's 200th Anniversary Parade, where he meets photographer Vicki Vale (Kim Basinger). Wayne and Vicki soon fall in love. Wayne finds in reviewing the Manor's surveillance cameras that Commissioner James Gordon (Pat Hingle), who left the party unexpectedly, has been summoned to Axis Chemicals to stop a break-in by Jack Napier (Jack Nicholson), crime lord Carl Grissom's (Jack Palance) right-hand man. As Batman, he fights Napier and his men, and during the fight, Napier falls into a vat of chemicals, transforming him into the insane, disfigured criminal mastermind the Joker.

==== Joker and 20th anniversary of his parents' murder ====
On the 20th anniversary of his parents' murder, Wayne leaves lunch with Vicki, and witnesses the Joker killing one of Grissom's associates. As Batman, he discovers that the Joker has poisoned various consumer products with his Smylex toxin. Wayne is informed by Alfred that he has a date with Vale at the Flugelheim Museum. Wayne states he has no plans to meet Vale that day, and realizes that the meeting was set up by the Joker. After a battle with the Joker's men, Batman and Vicki return to the Batcave, where he reveals his investigation of Joker's lethal chemicals to Vale, giving her an antidote to publish. Wayne nearly reveals to Vale that he is Batman, but they are interrupted by the Joker, who asks Wayne, "Have you ever danced with the devil by the pale moonlight?" before shooting the stunned billionaire, who survives because he is wearing body armor. When the Joker publicly challenges Batman to fight him during the anniversary gala, Wayne recognizes him as the mugger who killed his parents. On that same night, Alfred allows Vicki to enter the Batcave, thus revealing his employer's secret identity.

At the anniversary parade, Batman intercepts the Joker's parade float, with which the Joker plans to kill thousands of people with his toxin, in his customized, bat-shaped aircraft. After Batman foils his plan, the Joker shoots down the plane, and Batman pursues him and Vale into the cathedral, eventually finding them at the top level. Batman confronts the Joker over killing his parents, and gets into brutal hand-to-hand combat with the villain. As the Joker tries to escape on a helicopter, Batman uses his grappling gun to tie one of the cathedral's gargoyles to the Joker's leg; when the gargoyle breaks free from its foundations, the Joker falls to his death. In the aftermath, Batman gives the Gotham City Police Department (GCPD) his own personalized signal as a way of contacting him for help.

==== Christmas celebration ====
During Gotham's Christmas celebrations, Batman discovers the Red Triangle Gang has interrupted the annual tree lighting ceremony. Despite managing to fight them off, he is too late to stop them from taking Gotham businessman Max Shreck (Christopher Walken) hostage. The next day, a member of the gang kidnaps Mayor Jenkins's infant son, but the child is saved by the Penguin (Danny DeVito), a deformed mystery man who has lived in the sewers ever since his parents threw him into Gotham's reservoir. Though Penguin is immediately accepted by the public and allowed inside the Hall of Records to find his birth parents, Batman remains suspicious and discovers the Penguin may have once been a performer in the Red Triangle Circus and connected to a series of missing children cases. He deduces that the Penguin is the gang's leader and is planning something else, already knowing who his parents are.

Penguin becomes popular with the citizens of Gotham, and they discover his name is Oswald Cobblepot, with his parents having died years earlier. Meanwhile, Wayne meets with Shreck, who had been blackmailed into helping Oswald return to the surface, to contest his plans to build a new power plant. He meets Shreck's secretary Selina Kyle (Michelle Pfeiffer), unaware that she is the masked vigilante Catwoman, who is planning to kill Shreck as revenge for trying to kill her when she discovered that his power plant would actually drain Gotham of its energy and leave the city at the mercy of the Shreck family.

==== Catwoman and Penguin's plot ====
With Shreck's backing, the Penguin officially announces his plans to run for Mayor of Gotham City. Soon afterward, Wayne and Kyle discover that Cobblepot attempted to frame Batman by kidnapping the Ice Princess (Cristi Conaway), who was to relight the tree, and leaving behind a batarang. While Batman investigates the kidnapping, the Red Triangle Gang sabotages the Batmobile to allow the Penguin remote control access. Batman finds the Ice Princess standing on the edge of a rooftop, but the Penguin arrives and startles the girl by opening one of his trick umbrellas and releasing a swarm of bats, which knocks her off the roof to her death. She lands on the button to light the tree, causing a mass swarm of bats to attack the onlookers. Batman is forced to flee, now the chief suspect in the murder.

Batman returns to the Batmobile, but the car, having been hacked by the Penguin, takes him on a destructive joyride, though Batman is able to disable the signal and escape. With Alfred's help, Batman hacks into the Gotham Plaza's speakers during one of the Penguin's speeches and plays a recording of the villain bragging about having manipulated the entire city, causing a backlash from the crowd. At Shreck's masked ball, Kyle tells Wayne her plans to kill Shreck, and the two deduce each other's secret identities. At that moment, the Penguin crashes through the floor of the room, announcing his plans to kill all of the first-born sons of Gotham and take Shreck hostage. Batman arrives and interrogates Penguin's right-hand man, learning of the Penguin's hideout underneath the Arctic World exhibit at the abandoned Gotham Zoo.

Batman discovers that the Penguin plans to massacre Gotham by sending his penguins to fire missiles at the city. With Pennyworth's help, Batman reprograms the penguins to fire upon the Penguin's hideout. Batman and Penguin fight until the Penguin falls into the toxic waters in the sewer; the mortally injured Penguin make a futile attempt to kill Batman before succumbing to his wounds. Batman attempts to stop Catwoman from killing Shreck and reveals his secret identity. Catwoman kills Shreck by kissing him with a Taser in her mouth before she mysteriously disappears. After the GCPD seizes the Penguin's destroyed lair, Wayne finds Kyle's black cat, Miss Kitty, in an alleyway, as a very much alive Catwoman watches him from a rooftop while the Bat Signal shines in the sky.

=== Joel Schumacher films ===
==== Early life ====
While the previous films are used as a backstory, Batman's origin is expanded with more details. After his parents' wake, Bruce finds his father's diary. During a storm, he ran away with the diary and falls into a cave filled with bats on the family grounds.

==== Two-Face and the Riddler alliance ====
Batman (Kilmer) is called to stop the gangster Two-Face (Tommy Lee Jones) from robbing the Second Bank of Gotham, with help from Gordon and psychologist Chase Meridian (Nicole Kidman), who becomes instantly attracted to him. Two-Face was once Gotham's District Attorney, Harvey Dent, before a criminal scarred half of his face with acid, for which he blames Batman. The Dark Knight stops Two-Face from robbing the bank, but Two-Face escapes.

The next day, Bruce Wayne visits Wayne Enterprises and becomes acquainted with Edward Nygma (Jim Carrey), an employee who is obsessed with him. Nygma has developed the Box, a machine capable of transmitting television signals directly into the human brain. He asks Wayne to fund his invention, but Wayne turns him down, believing the science behind the Box "raises too many questions." Seeking revenge, Nygma reinvents himself as "the Riddler" and allies himself with Two-Face in a plot to destroy both Batman and Bruce Wayne, whom Nygma has discovered are one and the same.

==== Adopting Dick Grayson and becoming the Dynamic Duo ====
During a charity circus performance, Wayne witnesses Two-Face attack and murder a family of acrobats dubbed the Flying Graysons, leaving their youngest son, Dick (Chris O'Donnell), an orphan. Feeling a kinship with Dick, Wayne takes him in as his ward. Dick soon discovers Wayne's secret identity and asks Wayne to take him on as his crimefighting partner so he can kill Two-Face and avenge his family. Wayne, who still feels responsible for his parents' deaths, refuses, not wanting to be responsible for another lost life. Meanwhile, Wayne soon starts a romantic relationship with Meridian, who tries to help him move on from the trauma of his parents' deaths. Wayne decides to abandon his war on crime and lead a normal life with her. Before he can tell her, however, Riddler and Two-Face attack Wayne Manor, take Meridian hostage and destroy the Batcave. Batman tracks the villainous duo to their hideout, with help from Dick, whom he has finally accepted as his crimefighting partner, Robin.

Two-Face and the Riddler take Meridian and Robin hostage, setting a trap that would force Batman to choose between saving one life or the other. Instead, Batman destroys the Box, driving the Riddler insane, and saves Meridan and Robin. Two-Face corners them at gunpoint, and while flipping his coin to decide their fates, Batman throws a handful of coins at him, causing him to fall to his death, avenging Dick's family. Wayne accepts that he is both Batman and Bruce Wayne, and that he fights crime because he chooses to, not because he has to.

==== Mister Freeze and Poison Ivy ====
The new villain Mr. Freeze (Arnold Schwarzenegger) surfaces and commits a string of diamond thefts, catching the attention of Batman (Clooney) and Robin. After Freeze freezes but spares Robin in order to escape, Wayne chastises Dick, who has begun to chafe under Wayne's leadership. Wayne deduces that Freeze is Dr. Victor Fries, whose wife, Nora, is suffering from MacGregor's syndrome and was placed in cryogenic sleep until Freeze finds a cure. In his prior research, Fries accidentally fell backwards into a tank of modified liquid nitrogen, rendering him unable to survive outside of a subzero environment. In order to lure Freeze in, Wayne hosts a charity ball auctioning off the Wayne family diamonds with himself and Dick attending as Batman and Robin, leading to an ensuing battle and Freeze's capture. Wayne and Grayson become acquainted with Dr. Pamela Isley, who is secretly the metahuman ecoterrorist Poison Ivy, and who seduces Robin and allies with Freeze, breaking him out of Arkham Asylum. Ivy then unplugs Nora's life support and convinces Freeze that Batman is responsible.

==== Arrival of Barbara Wilson and Polar Ice Cap ====
Alfred's niece Barbara Wilson (Alicia Silverstone) comes to visit Wayne Manor, at about the same time that Wayne discovers that Alfred is dying of McGregor's Syndrome. She soon discovers the Batcave, and becomes Batgirl. Batman and Robin reluctantly allow her to help them defeat Freeze and Ivy, who are trying to turn Gotham City into a giant polar ice cap with a giant freeze ray that Freeze invented. Batgirl defeats Ivy, and the three head to the observatory to stop Freeze. Robin and Batgirl defeat Ivy's minion Bane (Robert Swenson) while Batman faces and subdues Freeze, redirecting the telescope's satellites to reflect sunlight to thaw Gotham, but Freeze detonates several bombs that he had placed around the freeze ray, destroying it. Nevertheless, Robin and Batgirl are still able to thaw the city. Batman reveals to a defeated Freeze that Nora is still alive, having been rescued in time.

Batman appeals to Freeze's humanity and asks him for the cure to MacGregor's syndrome's early stages to save Pennyworth. Freeze provides him with the cure and returns to Arkham to torment Ivy, his new cellmate, while Pennyworth makes a full recovery and reunites with Wayne, Grayson, and Barbara.

=== The Flash ===
==== Flashpoint and the two Barrys ====
Barry Allen / The Flash (Ezra Miller) travels back in time to prevent the murder of his mother, and accidentally lands ten years back in an alternate 2013, where various events prior to the date of his mother's murder have changed, and an older Wayne (Keaton) has retired as Batman and lives as a recluse in Wayne Manor, after having stopped "all crime" in Gotham. He encounters Barry, who has broken into the manor, as well as a younger Barry from his timeline that has just gained powers that were accidentally transferred to him by the older Barry. Wayne theorizes that the Flash has tangled multiple universes into one (thus placing him in this universe), and the older Barry explains that General Zod (Michael Shannon) and his army are preparing to invade Earth (Note: As depicted in Man of Steel (2013).) and that they must find Superman to help them defeat Zod. Wayne declines and leaves them.

The two Barrys break into the Batcave and use the computer to try and locate Superman. After seeing the older Barry working to find him, Wayne changes his mind and comes out of retirement to help the Barrys find Superman, who they believe is being held at a military site in Siberia. The group travels to Siberia to rescue Superman, but instead find his cousin Kara Zor-El (Sasha Calle). They return to the manor with Kara, who leaves to find Zod. Wayne helps the older Barry recreate the incident that granted him his powers. Barry is struck by lightning, but before Wayne can activate it again, the circuits of the machine fry. Kara returns and flies Barry into the sky to be struck again, and he successfully regains his powers.

==== Battle against Zod ====
Wayne, the Barrys, and Kara form this timeline's Justice League to fight Zod's forces in a desert. Kara is killed by Zod and Wayne dies after being unable to eject himself out of the Batwing which crashes into a Kryptonian ship. The Barrys attempt to go back in time to ensure both Wayne and Kara live, but fail. After confronting a dark alternate self, Barry goes back once again and allows his mother's death to occur, unraveling the universes and preventing Zod's successful invasion.

==== Timeline change ====
After returning to his original timeline, the older Barry's father is proven innocent of the murder of his wife, and that reality's Bruce Wayne calls Allen to congratulate him. When he arrives to the courthouse, Wayne (Clooney) looks different than the one Allen knows (Ben Affleck), as he slightly altered the timeline on his way back to create evidence that proved his father's innocence.

== Production ==
=== Casting ===
Multiple actors were considered for the role of Batman during production. In Tom Mankiewicz's original script which Ghostbusters director Ivan Reitman was attached to, actor Bill Murray was considered for the role in a script that featured Eddie Murphy as Dick Grayson / Robin. Gremlins director Joe Dante was attached to the project as well at one point. The script was intended as a comedy, but was altered significantly after Tim Burton's involvement. Mel Gibson, Kevin Costner, Charlie Sheen, Tom Selleck, Harrison Ford, Pierce Brosnan, Ray Liotta, Willem Dafoe, Alec Baldwin, Kurt Russell, Patrick Swayze, John Travolta, Richard Gere, Kyle MacLachlan, Michael Biehn, Dennis Quaid, Bruce Willis, Steven Seagal, and Jean-Claude Van Damme were all considered for the role. Eventually, producer Jon Peters suggested Michael Keaton, claiming he had the right "edgy, tormented quality" for the role, and based his argument on Keaton's dramatic performance in the film Clean and Sober. At the time, Keaton was primarily known for comedic parts in Mr. Mom and Beetlejuice, the latter also being directed by Burton. Keaton's casting as the character caused an uproar from fans of the character, who claimed Keaton was too comedic and too short for the role. Over 50,000 recorded protest letters were sent to Warner Bros. offices, and the casting was questioned by screenwriter Sam Hamm, producer Michael Uslan and even Batman co-creator Bob Kane.

Adam West, who played Batman in the 60s series wanted to reprise his role as Batman, but never even received an offer due to the producers wanting a complete tone shift away from his campy portrayal in the said work. West expressed dissappointment with this and said if he were to receive the role, he would play the character differently.

=== Recast ===
While Keaton decided not to reprise the role of Batman for the third film, Tim Burton was still involved as producer and pushed Johnny Depp to replace Keaton, before Val Kilmer got the role. Kilmer decided not to return and was replaced by George Clooney for the fourth film, with director Joel Schumacher feeling that Clooney could provide a lighter interpretation of the character than Keaton and Kilmer.

=== Batsuits ===
The Batsuit, worn by Keaton in Batman (1989).

The Batsuit worn by Keaton was designed by costume designer Bob Ringwood. Ringwood turned down the opportunity to work on James Bond film Licence to Kill to work on Batman. Ringwood stated that designing the Batsuit was difficult, claiming "the image of Batman in the comics is this huge, big six-foot-four hunk with a dimpled chin. Michael Keaton is a guy with average build. The problem was to make somebody who was average-sized and ordinary-looking into this bigger-than-life creature." Producer Jon Peters had requested for the Batsuit to feature a Nike product-placement, but was shot down by Burton and Ringwood, feeling that it would not be intimidating. 28 latex designs of the suit were made, as well as 25 different capes and 6 different heads. It was decided the use of spandex as in the comics and previous adaptations would not be intimidating enough, so the character was given black armor pieces.

The Batsuit was upgraded for Batman Returns, using more flexible foam latex, as well as a more traditional chest emblem. The updated Batsuit also featured a zipper to allow for urination in between takes and an updated plated armor torso that did not resemble sculpted muscles. Keaton still had difficulty hearing but found the neck movement much less restrictive than with the first costume. Due to the second costume's much thinner cowl with increased flexibility, a greater range of head-turning was allowed but could still leave gaps folding away from the cheek. The infamous "Bat-Turn" movement became an iconic part of the character's body language despite not truly needing to depend upon it, contrary to speculation from contemporary pundits. The wardrobe department spent seven weeks sculpting Batman Forever costumes on his body cast, preceding under the assumption that he would be returning. The addition of nipples and an enlarged codpiece to the Batsuit and Robin's costume in Batman & Robin was the subject of ridicule and criticism.

== In other media ==
=== Cancelled appearances ===
- In the cancelled film Superman Lives, Keaton was set to reprise his role as Batman in a cameo appearance.
- In the DC Extended Universe, Keaton was expected to take over the role of Batman from Ben Affleck; in the original ending of The Flash (2023) it would have incorporated his Batman into the main timeline of the DCEU's continuity. All plans were later cancelled due to James Gunn and Peter Safran's reboot of the franchise, the DC Universe (DCU).
  - In the cancelled film Batgirl, Keaton reprised his role of Batman in a supporting mentor role to Leslie Grace's Barbara Gordon / Batgirl. In August 2022, DC Films and HBO Max parent Warner Bros. Discovery (WBD) announced that, while the film had entered post-production, the studio no longer planned to release it as scheduled due to the company's cost-cutting measures and a refocus on theatrical releases.
  - In Aquaman and the Lost Kingdom (2023), Keaton filmed a cameo that was later cut from the theatrical release.

=== Television ===
Keaton's Batman was referenced in the Arrowverse television crossover event "Crisis on Infinite Earths". This series establishes the universe in which Batman (1989) and Batman Returns (1992) exist as "Earth-89", with Robert Wuhl, who portrayed Alexander Knox in Batman, reprising his role for the series for a cameo appearance. In the crossover, Bruce Wayne / Batman is mentioned as having captured the Joker (despite his apparent death) and married Selina Kyle / Catwoman.

=== Video games ===
The suit from Tim Burton's first Batman film was added as an alternate skin to Batman: Arkham Knight during a free update in August 2015.

The suit from Tim Burton's first Batman film was added as a costume for Batman in Multiversus as part of an 85th anniversary celebration for the character.

=== Comic books ===
==== Film adaptations ====
A comic adaptation of Tim Burton's Batman titled Batman: The Official Comic Adaptation of the Warner Bros Motion Picture was released in June 1989. Longtime Batman editor at DC Dennis O'Neil adapted the screenplay, with art provided by Jerry Ordway.

A comic adaptation for Batman Returns titled Batman Returns: The Official Comic Adaptation of the Warner Bros Motion Picture was released in June 1992. The story was once again adapted by Dennis O' Neil, with pencils provided by Steve Erwin and inked embellishments by José Luis García-López. Many of the illustrations García-López did for the film's style guide were re-purposed for the comic adaptation.

==== Comic continuation ====
A comic continuation that was to chronicle the events of Tim Burton's failed third Batman film titled Batman '89 was submitted to DC Comics written by Joe Quinones and Kath Leth in March 2016. The run was inspired by DC's recent comic run Batman '66, which was a continuation of the 1966 television series starring Adam West and Burt Ward. The story was to be a direct sequel to Burton's Batman films, with visual allusions to Michael Keaton as Batman, Billy Dee Williams (who portrayed a pre-disfigurement Harvey Dent in Batman) as Two-Face, Marlon Wayans as Robin, Michelle Pfeiffer as Catwoman, and Robin Williams as The Riddler. The story would also introduce iterations of Barbara Gordon, Poison Ivy and Harley Quinn into the story's fictional universe. However, the comic run was initially rejected by DC.

In February 2021, it was confirmed that DC would in fact be proceeding to develop a comic continuation of Burton's Batman films, with Sam Hamm returning to write the script while Joe Quinones provides the comic's art.

=== Batman: Resurrection ===
On April 11, 2024, it was announced that a new novel, Batman: Resurrection, set in the Tim Burton Batman universe would be written by author John Jackson Miller. The book serves as a direct sequel to Batman (1989) and is set between the events of the 1989 film and its sequel, Batman Returns (1992), and deals primarily with the aftermath of the Joker's rampage while the remnants of his Smylex formula brings Batman into conflict with two new foes in the form of Karlo Babić and Dr. Hugo Strange. The book was released on October 15, 2024.

=== Batman: Revolution ===
A sequel to Batman: Resurrection, titled Batman: Revolution, was revealed by Miller following the former's release and was published on October 28, 2025.

== Reception and legacy ==
Michael Keaton's portrayal as Batman was seen as hugely influential towards further adaptations of the character. Keaton's portrayal inspired the portrayal by Kevin Conroy in Batman: The Animated Series. As the first version of the character to carry a grapple device with a motorized reel, as well a cape that can harden and transform into a hang-glider, these concepts would become highly influential for most contemporary appearances of the character. Keaton's grim, monosyllabic persona in-costume has been paid tribute to throughout multiple adaptations of the character, including video game appearances and homages.

This adaptation of the character was also seen as the first to change their voice while in costume as Batman, something which future actors Kevin Conroy, Ben Affleck and Christian Bale would also add to their interpretations. Michael Keaton's portrayal of the character appears on AFI's 100 Years...100 Heroes & Villains at #46 on the heroes side, while Jack Nicholson's portrayal as The Joker ranked 45th on the villains side.

=== Birdman comparisons ===
Due to his involvement in the film, Michael Keaton's role in the film Birdman directed by Alejandro G. Iñárritu has been compared to Keaton's own experiences as Batman. Many people have come to the conclusion that the film is a reflection of Michael Keaton's life post-Batman, as the film itself focuses on Riggan Thompson, a struggling, aging actor who is best known for having played a winged superhero earlier in his career.

When Iñárritu contacted Keaton about taking the role of Riggan, Keaton asked him if he was making fun of him for playing Batman. Despite comparisons between Riggan and Keaton and many people believing that the role was taken by the actor to let out frustration at the role, Keaton has claimed that he loves talking about his time as Batman, and is extremely grateful for the role.

Keaton was nominated for the Academy Award for Best Actor for his performance in Birdman, his first-ever nomination, and this helped him gain the villainous role of Adrian Toomes / Vulture in the Marvel Cinematic Universe (MCU) film Spider-Man: Homecoming (2017).

== See also ==
- Bruce Wayne (Dark Knight trilogy)
- Bruce Wayne (DC Extended Universe)
