= Batman: Resurrection =

2024 novel by John Jackson Miller

- Cover art
- Author: John Jackson Miller
- Audio read by: Will Damron
- Series: Batman
- Genres: Superhero
- Publisher: Penguin Random House
- Publication date: October 15, 2024
- Publication place: United States
- Media type: Print (hardcover and paperback), e-book, audiobook
- Pages: 432
- ISBN: 9780593871904 (First edition hardcover)
- OCLC: 1436833868
- Dewey Decimal: 813.6
- LC Class: PS3613.I53858 B38 2024
- Followed by: Batman: Revolution

Batman: Resurrection is an American superhero novel written by John Jackson Miller. The novel is set in Tim Burton's Batman film series, taking place in-between Batman (1989) and Batman Returns (1992), exploring the aftermath of The Joker's death and Bruce Wayne / Batman's obsessive need to protect Gotham City while investigating a major mystery. The story introduces the characters of Clayface and Hugo Strange. It was released on October 15, 2024, by Penguin Random House.

== Plot ==
Understudy Karlo Babić meets with a contact to buy smuggled cosmetics from Central City to deliver to theater actor Tolliver Kingston. Kingston has Karlo try the cosmetics on himself first, but the products deform Karlo's face and render him comatose.

Six months after the Joker's death, billionaire Bruce Wayne, who secretly moonlights as the vigilante Batman, has opened and funded the Smylex Ward of the Gotham General Hospital to treat the survivors of the Joker's Smylex attack, among them Karlo. The ward is headed by Dr. Hugh Auslander. Gotham, however, continues to be plagued by the Joker's former henchmen, now known as The Last Laughs, led by Lawrence and secretly backed by business mogul Max Shreck, who seeks to take advantage of the unrest in the city and gain more power and influence while himself working with an unknown partner communicating with Lawrence via tapes on a boombox. Karlo eventually regains consciousness and finds his face severely deformed but with the ability to morph it into any shape he desires. He escapes from the hospital and commits an impromptu bus hijacking. Batman confronts Karlo on the runaway bus but Karlo escapes; he is dubbed "Clayface" by the media. Determined to know what has happened to him, Karlo feigns a phone call from District Attorney Harvey Dent to get Auslander out of the hospital and impersonates Auslander to get into his office to see his files. Auslander returns and meets Karlo, who realizes that the Smylex caused his condition. Karlo rejects Auslander's offer of help and flees again.

Karlo takes revenge on Kingston by locking him in a trunk and impersonating him onstage at a theater play and insulting the audience to ruin Kingston's reputation. Kingston loses consciousness in the process due to asphyxiation, and Karlo calls Auslander in a panic, but Kingston does not survive. Auslander promises Karlo protection and a cure for his condition in exchange for favors to help in his research. Auslander takes control of the Last Laughs by having Karlo pose as the Joker and threaten Shreck into compliance, and send a panic throughout the city by appearing as the Joker on television and threatening mass bank robberies.

Bruce, who has himself been plagued with nightmares about his confrontation with the Joker in Gotham Cathedral despite his butler Alfred Pennyworth's attempts to placate him, investigates Joker's apparent return alongside his new ally, Commissioner James Gordon. They find the Joker's grave empty and his body apparently dumped nearby, but the body is later identified at the morgue as that of Dr. Arthur Davis, the surgeon who treated Joker's face shortly after his fall into the acid in Axis Chemicals. With the Joker's body missing, Batman and Gordon assume that the Joker has survived and returned. Vicki Vale returns to Gotham to help Bruce's investigation along with Alexander Knox. Piecing together clues sent anonymously from Gotham Globe reporter Norman Pinkus, Bruce realizes that Auslander is actually Dr. Hegesias "Hugo" Strange, a scientist who has worked for several governments (under a number of aliases) with the basic ingredients for what eventually became Smylex, coinciding with Auslander revealing his identity to Karlo and Lawrence and the man communicating with Lawrence on the boomboxes, as well as having secretly helped Lawrence escape police custody. Karlo begins to doubt his allegiance to Strange, who subdues him into obedience via hypnosis and has him pose as Bruce to organize a charity play at the Imperial Theater with Gotham's elite attending. On the night of the bank attacks, Batman stops the goons but finds no evidence of attempted robbery, and realizes that the robberies were merely a ruse to keep him and the police distracted long enough for Strange and his men to break into Gotham Armsgard, where Strange's research has been kept. The Last Laughs massacre the guards and steal the items, but Karlo fights off his hypnosis, horrified by the murders. Strange abandons Karlo. Batman pursues Strange into the sewer, where Strange reveals that his life's work was Project Hegemon, intended to create a superior race of beings which he dubs Monster Men. Having already used Hegemon on several Last Laughs, Strange sets a group of Monster Men on Batman, who escapes with help from Karlo. Batman reveals to Karlo that Strange has merely been using the Smylex Ward as a cover for his own research and the patients as his pawns, including Karlo, and also reveals that Kingston died of a drug overdose secretly administered by Strange to frame Karlo and coerce him into working with him. Karlo swears revenge and leaves, with Batman too exhausted to pursue him.

On the night of the charity play, Karlo confronts Strange but is knocked out by Lawrence and locked in the same trunk as Kingston's, though he escapes via its secret disappearing act lock. Strange plans to hypnotize the audience and unleash Hegemon on them in order to ransom the city, but Batman foils the attempt. Strange flees and takes Alfred and Vicki hostage to the cathedral, where he has stored emergency Hegemon canisters to infect the entire city. Batman and Karlo work together to destroy the canisters from Batman's new Batwing, the Alpha Bat, and confront Strange at the top of the cathedral. Lawrence flees while Karlo, disguised as Batman, subdues the Monster Men and sprays Hegemon gas in Strange's face, damaging Strange's body and brain long enough for Karlo to knock him out. Karlo almost throws Strange to his death, but relents at Batman's insistence.

In the aftermath, Karlo poses as Strange to confess his crimes to Gotham and promise a cure for the Smylex victims and the Monster Men. Strange is sent to Blackgate Infirmary for treatment followed by prison. Karlo turns himself in for his role in Strange's crimes while promising to cooperate in exchange for a cure, the Smylex Ward having received a large donation from Shreck, though Bruce remains wary of Shreck's true motives, suspecting him of having been working with Strange. The Joker's corpse is found in the basement of the Last Laughs' local tavern, confirming his death. Despite her lingering feelings for him, Vicki accepts that Bruce will never abandon his crusade as Batman, and leaves Gotham for good. As Bruce and Alfred go over schematics for a more amphibious vehicle, Bruce receives a postcard containing a riddle implying that the sender, apparently Pinkus, was responsible for saving him from the Monster Men in the sewer. Bruce resolves to investigate Shreck and the riddle at a later time.

== Characters ==
- Bruce Wayne/Batman: The vigilante protector of Gotham City who has opened and funded the Smylex ward of Gotham General Hospital to help the survivors of the Joker's Smylex massacre, but who also continues to be haunted by the memory of his parents' murder, and by theories and nightmares that the Joker may have survived their last encounter. In Batman and Batman Returns, he is played by Michael Keaton.
- The Joker/Jack Napier: Batman's deceased archenemy who continues to plague Bruce Wayne's nightmares and who is impersonated numerous times by Karlo Babić. In Batman, he is played by Jack Nicholson.
- Alfred Pennyworth: Bruce's butler, confidant and father-figure who grows concerned over Bruce's obsession with the Joker despite the latter's death. In the films, he is played by Michael Gough.
- Karlo Babić: a struggling stage actor who goes by the name Basil Karlo and who is disfigured after being exposed to Smylex-laced products smuggled from Central City which give him the ability to shape his face and alter his voice to impersonate anyone. After a confrontation with Batman on a runaway bus, he is dubbed Clayface by the media, and seeks Dr. Hugh Auslander's help to find a cure.
- Dr. Hugo Strange: the head of the Smylex Ward of Gotham General Hospital who has secretly been experimenting with Smylex chemicals to create a superior race of humans as part of Project Hegemon under a number of aliases. Throughout the book, he initially uses the name Dr. Hugh Auslander. In Batman, he is played by Michael Balfour. In Batman '89, he is modeled after actor Christopher Lee.
- James Gordon: the commissioner of the Gotham City Police Department, now a secret ally of Batman's. In the films, he is portrayed by Pat Hingle.
- Harvey Dent: the district attorney of Gotham City. In Batman, he is portrayed by Billy Dee Williams.
- Leo Borg: the Mayor of Gotham City. In Batman, he is portrayed by Lee Wallace.
- Lawrence: a former boombox-carrying member of the Joker's gang, having survived the battle in the cathedral and started his own gang, the Last Laughs. In Batman, he is played by George Lane Cooper.
- Alexander Knox: a reporter for the Gotham Globe investigating the Last Laughs and later the Joker's possible return. In Batman and the Arrowverse, he is played by Robert Wuhl.
- Vicki Vale: Bruce's former girlfriend who returns to Gotham to help him investigate the Joker's possible return and Hugh Auslander. In Batman, she is played by Kim Basinger.
- Max Shreck: a business mogul seeking to gain more power and influence over Gotham in the aftermath of the Joker's rampage. In Batman Returns, he is played by Christopher Walken.
- Chip Shreck: Max Shreck's son and heir. In Batman Returns, he is played by Andrew Bryniarski.
- Fred Atkins: Max Shreck's business partner.
- Selina Kyle: Shreck's timid secretary, traumatized by her own experiences with the Joker. In Batman Returns, she is played by Michelle Pfeiffer.
- Julie Madison: a stage actress, friend of Karlo Babić and Bruce's current girlfriend. Though she does not appear in either of Tim Burton's films, she was portrayed by Elle Macpherson in Joel Schumacher's Batman & Robin, which was intended as a third sequel to Batman at the time of its release.
- Dr. Arthur Davis: the surgeon who previously performed illegal surgery on Jack Napier's face, whose disfigured corpse is later found in Napier's grave. In Batman, he is played by Steve Plytas.
- Drake Winston: a mechanic working in the Burnside neighborhood of Gotham City. In Batman '89, he is modeled after Marlon Wayans, who was Tim Burton's original choice to play Robin in Batman Forever while Michael Keaton was still attached to play Batman.
- Barbara Gordon: the daughter of James Gordon who works with the GCPD. In Batman '89 she is modeled after actress Winona Ryder.
- Tattooed Strongman: a former bodybuilder and member of the Red Triangle Gang who resides in the sewers of Gotham City with their boss. In Batman Returns, he is played by Rick Zumwalt.
- Norman Pinkus: a Gotham Globe reporter and vigilante investigator/detective who sees himself as a rival to Batman, often trying to get his attention via riddles.

== Background ==
Batman: Resurrection was announced in April 2024 as a follow-up novel to the 1989 film Batman, and was being written by author John Jackson Miller. Miller said "There are dream projects, and then there are projects you never dreamt were possible [...] People always ask what world I wanted to get the chance to write in; I never named Burton's take on Batman because I never imagined it could happen. But [PRH] editor Tom Hoeler found a way." Miller further revealed that the 1989 film shaped the writer he had become, mentioning that he saw the film in the theater twelve times and wrote college papers and comics magazine articles about it. Unlike the ongoing comic book series Batman '89 (2021–present) from DC Comics, which serves as an alternative continuation of Batman (1989) and Batman Returns (1992), Batman: Resurrection explores the events following the 1989 film and before the events of 1992's Batman Returns. Miller revealed that the book's timeline enables characters such as Vicki Vale, Alexander Knox, Selina Kyle, and Max Shreck to appear.

== Sequel ==
In October 2024 it was revealed that Batman: Resurrection would be the first of a duology of novels; a sequel titled Batman: Revolution was later revealed by Miller and was released on October 21, 2025.
