= Star Wars: Knight Errant =

Comic book series by John Jackson Miller

- Star Wars: Knight Errant #1 (October 2010). Art by Joe Quinones and Dave Ross.

Publication information
- Publisher: Dark Horse Comics
- Schedule: Monthly
- Format: Ongoing series
- Genre: Science fiction
- Publication date: October 2010 – October 2012
- Main character: Kerra Holt

Creative team
- Written by: John Jackson Miller
- Penciller(s): Frederico Dallocchio; Ivan Rodriguez
- Inker(s): Mark Kenna; Belardino Brabo
- Colorist: Michael Atiyeh
- Editor: Dave Marshall

Star Wars: Knight Errant is a 2010 comic book series set in the fictional Star Wars universe, written by John Jackson Miller. The comic series is the successor to the Star Wars: Knights of the Old Republic series that was published by Dark Horse Comics and which ran for 50 issues. The story is set at the beginning of the Old Republic, 1000 years before the birth of Luke Skywalker, when the evil Sith lords still control large portions of the galaxy, and details the exploits of Kerra Holt, a young Jedi Knight who is attempting to fight against the Sith. A companion novel was released in 2011.

== Comics ==
In February 2010, the Knights of the Old Republic comic series ended with issue #50. In August 2010, Dark Horse Comics distributed a preview issue for a new series, Star Wars: Knight Errant at Star Wars Celebration V. The new series was to be written by John Jackson Miller, who had written for the Knights of the Old Republic series and had also written the Lost Tribe of the Sith series of e-book novellas. The first issue of Knight Errant was published in October 2010. The series is being edited by Dave Marshall and pencilled by Frederico Dallocchio and Ivan Rodriguez.

=== Plot summary ===
The protagonist of the series is Kerra Holt, a young female human who has just become a Jedi Knight. The Old Republic has been stretched to the breaking point and much of the galaxy is still controlled by Sith Lords, who are at war with both the Republic and, in many cases, with each other. In the first story arc Aflame which ran in issues #1-5, Holt is sent behind enemy lines into Sith-controlled space on her very first mission for the Republic.

She soon finds herself on her own, with no support from the Republic, on a world called Chelloa. A group of miners there are being oppressed by a Sith Lord, and she tries to help them. She inadvertently sparks a war between the oppressive Sith Lord and his brother, and the planet is almost destroyed; however, she is able to save it.

=== Issues ===
- Knight Errant #0: Aflame, Part 0 of 5 (Color 24 Pages, August 2010) $0.00 [Celebration V Exclusive Promotional Giveaway]
- Knight Errant #1: Aflame, Part 1 of 5 (Color 40 Pages, October 2010) $2.99
- Knight Errant #2: Aflame, Part 2 of 5 (Color 40 Pages, November 2010) $2.99
- Knight Errant #3: Aflame, Part 3 of 5 (Color 40 Pages, December 2010) $2.99
- Knight Errant #4: Aflame, Part 4 of 5 (Color 40 Pages, January 2011) $2.99
- Knight Errant #5: Aflame, Part 5 of 5 (Color 40 Pages, February 2011) $2.99
- Knight Errant #6: Deluge, Part 1 of 5 (Color 40 Pages, August 2011) $3.50
- Knight Errant #7: Deluge, Part 2 of 5 (Color 40 Pages, September 2011) $3.50
- Knight Errant #8: Deluge, Part 3 of 5 (Color 40 Pages, October 2011) $3.50
- Knight Errant #9: Deluge, Part 4 of 5 (Color 32 Pages, November 2011) $3.50
- Knight Errant #10: Deluge, Part 5 of 5 (Color 40 Pages, December 2011) $3.50
- Knight Errant #11: Escape, Part 1 of 5 (Color 32 Pages, June 2012) $3.50
- Knight Errant #12: Escape, Part 2 of 5 (Color 32 Pages, July 2012) $3.50
- Knight Errant #13: Escape, Part 3 of 5 (Color 32 Pages, August 2012) $3.50
- Knight Errant #14: Escape, Part 4 of 5 (Color 32 Pages, September 2012) $3.50
- Knight Errant #15: Escape, Part 5 of 5 (Color 32 Pages, October 2012) $3.50

=== Trade paperbacks ===
- Aflame.....(#s 1–5) - $17.99
- Deluge.....(#s 6–10) - $18.99
- Escape.....(#s 11–15) - $18.99

== Novel ==
A companion novel with the same name, also written by John Jackson Miller. was published by Del Rey on January 25, 2011. The novel is set a few weeks after the events of Aflame.

== Reception ==
The initial issue of Aflame was described by IGN as "a fairly standard adventure". They remarked that the ambiance of Deluge's first issue was "enjoyable enough to ride through this introductory episode's rocky launch." Comic Book Resources commented on the same issue, stating, "[...] if this first issue is indicative of what I can expect from more, well then, sign me up." IGN characterized the third issue as "a strong middle issue". In their review of the fourth issue, Comic Book Resources noted that it features "[...] a storyline that has some legs, offers up some fun, and has room to grow." In their assessment of the fifth issue, IGN remarked that "there isn't too much to recommend about this by-the-numbers conclusion." Regarding the first issue of Escape, they stated it "carries on the Knight Errant tradition capably". In their review of the third issue, IGN mentioned that it "has just enough going for it to overcome its shortcomings."
