= Lego Batman: Legacy of the Dark Knight =

2026 video game

- Developer: Traveller's Tales (Note: Additional work and development support by Rocksteady Studios and WB Games Montréal)
- Publisher: Warner Bros. Games
- Director: Mark Green
- Producers: Matthew Burton; Owen Ballhatchet; Ren Teloka
- Designers: Jimmy Sedota; Chris Wyatt; Christopher Andrew McGerr; Matthew Wood
- Programmers: Rian Walters; Ian Simpson
- Artists: David Woodman; David Hoye; Josh Pickering Pick; Richard Dawson
- Writers: Bob Scott; David Brown; James Pugh; Joe Moore
- Composer: Simon Withenshaw
- Series: Lego Batman
- Engine: Unreal Engine 5
- Platforms: PlayStation 5; Windows; Xbox Series X/S; Nintendo Switch 2
- Release: PS5, Windows, Xbox Series X/S; May 22, 2026 (Note: Pre-ordering the Deluxe Edition granted 72-hour early access beginning on May 19, 2026.); Nintendo Switch 2; September 18, 2026
- Genre: Action-adventure
- Modes: Single-player, multiplayer

Lego Batman: Legacy of the Dark Knight is a 2026 action-adventure game developed by Traveller's Tales and published by Warner Bros. Games. It is the fourth installment in the Lego Batman video game series, and features an original story inspired by comic books, films and other media from the Batman franchise.

Legacy of the Dark Knight uses Unreal Engine 5 as opposed to TT Games' proprietary game engine, and takes heavy inspiration from Batman: Arkham, another series of Batman video games. Announced at Gamescom in 2025, it was released on PlayStation 5, Windows, and Xbox Series X/S on May 22, 2026, and was released on the Nintendo Switch 2 on September 18, 2026. The game received generally favorable reviews.

== Gameplay ==
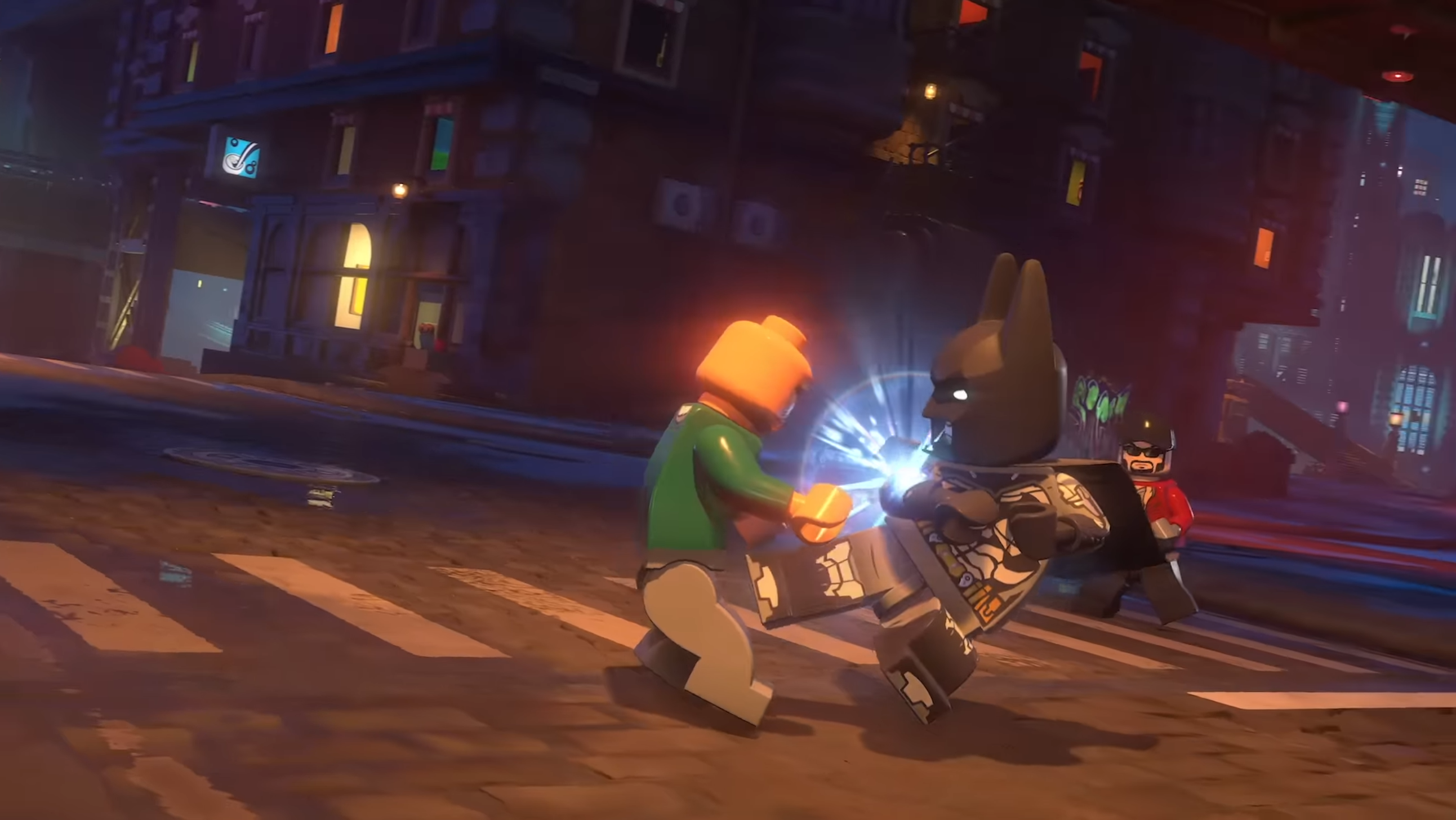
Batman attacking an enemy

Lego Batman: Legacy of the Dark Knight is an action-adventure game played from a third-person perspective, alternating between various action-adventure sequences and puzzle-solving scenarios. The game can be played solo, or with another player through local multiplayer. DC Comics president Jim Lee described Legacy of the Dark Knight as "a love letter to the world of Batman", with the game featuring an original story that incorporates different elements from various Batman-related media, including films, television series, comic books, and other video games. For example, the character skins are taken from Batman comics and adaptations, with some of them based on the likeness of the actors who played the characters in live-action projects, such as Michelle Pfeiffer's Catwoman and Danny DeVito's Penguin from the film Batman Returns (1992), Heath Ledger's Joker from The Dark Knight (2008), and Jeffrey Wright's Jim Gordon from The Batman (2022).

Unlike previous Lego video games, which allowed players to control hundreds of different characters, Legacy of the Dark Knight includes only seven playable characters: Batman, Jim Gordon, Catwoman, Robin, Batgirl, Nightwing, and Talia al Ghul, each possessing unique skills and gadgets. For example, Catwoman is able to use a whip as a weapon, while Gordon has a gun that sprays foam. The game is set in an open-world Lego version of Gotham City, with players tasked with exploring the city and engaging in combat, which has been compared to that of the Batman: Arkham series. Traversal across Gotham City can be done through grappling hooks, gliding, and vehicles such as the Batmobile. Players can also customize the Batcave to display a variety of vehicles and Batsuits, as well as trophies and additional items that can be collected throughout the game.

== Synopsis ==
=== Setting and characters ===
Lego Batman: Legacy of the Dark Knight retells the story of Bruce Wayne / Batman from his origin as a trainee with the League of Shadows, to becoming a hero of Gotham City. The game features a large ensemble of characters drawn from the history of Batman media. The main playable characters are Batman and his allies: Jim Gordon (resembling the Jeffrey Wright version), Selina Kyle / Catwoman, Dick Grayson / Robin / Nightwing, Barbara Gordon / Batgirl, and Talia al Ghul. Other allies of Batman include Alfred Pennyworth and Lucius Fox. Supervillain members of Batman's rogues gallery include the Joker (including his Jack Napier portrayal from the 1989 Batman film), Penguin, Poison Ivy, Ra's al Ghul, Bane, Two-Face, Mr. Freeze, Firefly, Scarecrow, Deathstroke, Solomon Grundy, Calendar Man, Killer Moth, Mutant Leader, Condiment King, Riddler, Egghead, Kite Man, Carmine Falcone and his daughter Sofia, Cluemaster, Black Mask, Polka-Dot Man, Ratcatcher, and Gentleman Ghost. Additional characters include Bruce's parents Thomas and Martha Wayne, as well as Gillian B. Loeb, Arnold Flass, Harvey Bullock, Renee Montoya, and Aaron Cash. The character Bat-Mite appears as a shop vendor, providing Batman with purchaseable cosmetics such as outfits and Batcave decoration items.

The "Mayhem Mode" DLC features the Joker and Harley Quinn as playable characters, and tells the story of their first meeting and escape from Arkham Asylum, followed by an attempt at taking over Gotham City's North Island.

=== Plot ===
As a child, Bruce Wayne witnesses his parents murdered by Jack Napier, a criminal under the employ of Carmine Falcone. Ten years later, Bruce finds that Gotham is still crime-ridden, with the police and officials in Falcone's payroll. To address the city's crime, he is invited by Ra's al Ghul to join the League of Shadows in Nanda Parbat, where he is trained in ninjutsu alongside Ra's' daughter Talia. After the two uncover that Ra's plans to destroy Gotham upon believing it is beyond saving, Bruce burns down the temple, killing Ra's with Talia's fate left uncertain.

Bruce returns to Gotham and with the help of his butler, Alfred Pennyworth, decides to fight crime as the vigilante Batman. He allies with one of the city's few non-corrupt police officers, Jim Gordon, and they work together to expose Falcone's crimes and have him arrested. Napier attempts to expand his criminal empire by creating the Red Hood Gang and lacing teddy bears with the toxic chemical Smilex. During a confrontation with Batman and Gordon, Napier falls into a vat of chemicals.

Some time later, a gang of mimes target associates of Falcone, including Oswald Cobblepot, who is running for mayor. Batman teams up with expert thief Selina Kyle, operating as Catwoman, to apprehend Cobblepot. The two learn the perpetrator is Napier, who now resembles a clown and calls himself the Joker. The Joker invites the people of Gotham to a parade where he plans to expose them all to Smilex, though he is thwarted by Batman and Catwoman and has his face scarred after falling off a cathedral.

Following this event, Bruce reveals his identity to Selina and the two begin a relationship. The two go on a date to Haly's Circus, which is hijacked by disfigured district attorney Harvey Dent, now known as the criminal Two-Face. Bruce helps young acrobat Dick Grayson prevent Two-Face from blowing up the circus and trains him to become Batman's sidekick, Robin. During their first night on patrol, they discover that botanist Pamela Isley has been transforming plants into carnivorous creatures to protect Robinson Park from being taken over by a new power plant. Isley is exposed to the formula and becomes Poison Ivy, forcing the duo to subdue her. The encounter encourages Bruce to find a cleaner alternative to powering the city.

Years later, Bruce attends a costume charity gala, where Firefly attempts to steal some of the jewels from the event. Gordon's daughter Barbara, who has created her own Batsuit, assists Batman in defeating him. The gala is then invaded by Mr. Freeze, who encases Gordon in ice and steals the jewel. The two collaborate alongside Dick, now known as Nightwing, to stop Freeze from freezing the city at the observatory and create an antidote to unfreeze Gordon. Despite Bruce's hesitance, Barbara is welcomed into the Bat Family as Batgirl.

When Bruce finishes creating the Clean Energy Device to power Gotham, the Joker resurfaces and begins a massive crime spree. He is apprehended by Batman and Talia, who faked her death to track down remnants of the League of Shadows. They discover the League's current leader is Bane, a ruthless mercenary who has been involved with all of Batman's adversaries. As they interrogate the Joker at Arkham Asylum, a breakout ensues. Batman is separated from Talia in the chaos and attacked by numerous foes. After defeating them, he confronts Bane, who reveals his plan to continue Ra's' mission to destroy Gotham by converting the Clean Energy Device into a Dionesium bomb and cripples Batman in combat before leaving him for dead.

Bane has the criminals and League of Shadows take over Gotham as he powers down the city before attempting to detonate the bomb at Wayne Tower. While Nightwing and Batgirl ascend the tower, Catwoman defeats Bane with the help of Alfred donning an armored Batsuit. At the top, they find a recovered Bruce, who reveals that Talia is Ra's' actual successor and wants vengeance on him for his actions in Nanda Parbat. Despite wielding an advanced Batsuit, she is defeated with the combined efforts of Batman, Nightwing, Batgirl, and Commissioner Gordon. After Talia rejects Bruce's offer to reform and escapes, the Bat Family flies off to assist in recovery efforts.

==== Mayhem Mode ====
On her first day working at Arkham Asylum, psychiatrist Harleen Quinzel encounters the Joker and becomes infatuated with him. She later takes the Joker to see the asylum's warden Quincy Sharp, who informs them that the Joker is being transferred to Belle Reve Prison for the Task Force X program, helmed by A.R.G.U.S. director Amanda Waller. Not wishing to let the Joker be taken away, Harleen dresses up in a harlequin outfit, announces herself as Harley Quinn, and breaks the Joker out of Arkham. The two of them later find a hideout in Gotham's North Island, where they begin planning their takeover of the island.

The Joker and Harley proceed with constructing various objects all over Gotham, establishing their territory while evading A.R.G.U.S. troops, Task Force X members, and Batman and Robin. Eventually, the pair attend the "Villy Awards", a ceremony honoring the various villains of Gotham. The ceremony is interrupted and raided by Batman, Robin, Batgirl, and the G.C.P.D, who apprehend the criminals and take them back to Arkham.

== Development ==
In 2023, a job listing from WB Games Montréal revealed they were working on an unannounced DC Comics video game that would be single-player and based in Unreal Engine 5. In February 2025, Bloomberg News reporter Jason Schreier claimed in February 2025 that TT Games was working on a Lego game targeting a 2026 release.

For Lego Star Wars: The Skywalker Saga (2022), TT Games developed their own proprietary NTT engine but it proved difficult to work with. TT Games leadership had debated whether the studio should abandon their proprietary engine and switch to Unreal Engine during The Skywalker Saga's development; following its release, the studio was quick to move to Unreal Engine 5 for the development of Lego Batman: Legacy of the Dark Knight. While TT Games had previously created an open world Gotham in Lego Batman 2: DC Super Heroes (2012), strategic director Jonathan Smith credited advances in technology for enabling "a much more immersive city than [they] were ever able to do before" with the scale of the game being "bigger than the other titles [they]'ve made in the past". Visual fidelity has been increased in Lego Batman: Legacy of the Dark Knight to better represent the features of physical Lego pieces, such as the microscopic imperfections and texture of the plastic in minifigures and the cloth texture of capes. These are intended to add "visual interest" to blocky Lego bricks that are set together with non-Lego elements such as road tarmac.

Matthew Wood served as lead designer on Lego Batman: Legacy of the Dark Knight. The game takes heavy inspiration from the Batman: Arkham series' freeflow combat system, though it has been adapted to be more approachable. Rather than trying to replicate Arkham's technical depth, Legacy of the Dark Knight encourages players to use a combination of abilities and gadgets like batarangs and environmental actions. The decision to feature a smaller roster of seven playable characters compared to previous Lego games was informed by wanting to focus on deeper gameplay systems with each character having their own distinct abilities.

Legacy of the Dark Knight was announced at Gamescom's Opening Night Live on August 19, 2025. On April 30, 2026, TT Games announced that Lego Batman: Legacy of the Dark Knight had "gone gold" as development work had been finished. In the same month, DC Comics announced a "Building Bad" sweepstakes, in which fans can participate and submit designs for a new villain character, who would appear in Legacy of the Dark Knight as well as several DC titles in the future. In July 2026, at San Diego Comic-Con, the winning character was announced as Rhetoric, and the design for the character in the game was also revealed. Rhetoric made his debut as part of the game's post-launch content.

=== Audio ===
Due to the 2024–2025 SAG-AFTRA video game strike, the cast from previous Lego Batman titles as well as the 2018 spin-off, Lego DC Super-Villains, did not return to reprise their roles as they were affiliated with SAG-AFTRA. Notable members of the new voice cast include Shai Matheson as Batman, Colin McFarlane (who previously portrayed Gillian B. Loeb in The Dark Knight trilogy) as Jim Gordon, Rich Keeble as Two-Face, and Matt Berry as Bane.

Archive audio of late Batman actors Adam West and Kevin Conroy were also used.

== Release ==
Lego Batman: Legacy of the Dark Knight was originally scheduled for release on PlayStation 5, Windows, and Xbox Series X/S on May 29, 2026, with the Nintendo Switch 2 version to be launched later. On March 16, 2026, it was announced that the release date was being brought forward a week to May 22. Knowing that the company wanted to target a spring release, TT Games's head of production Jonathan Smith expressed relief over "hav[ing] some space" around the game's release date after Grand Theft Auto VI's delay from May to November. On June 3, 2026, the Nintendo Switch 2 version's September 18 release date was announced, with confirmation that the physical copies would be Game-Key Cards.

A post-launch expansion called "The Mayhem Collection" was released for Deluxe Edition owners on September 18, 2026, which featured a new game mode with the Joker and Harley Quinn as playable characters, alongside additional cosmetic outfits for Batman and other playable characters in the main game.

== Reception ==
=== Critical response ===
Reception

Aggregate scores
Aggregator	Score
Metacritic	(PC): 84/100 (PS5): 83/100 (XSXS): 86/100 (NS2): 80/100
OpenCritic	97% recommend (Note: Based on 74 reviews)

Review scores
Publication	Score
Eurogamer	4/5
Game Informer	8.75/10
GamesRadar+	4/5
IGN	8/10
PC Gamer (US)	83/100
Push Square	8/10
Shacknews	9/10
Video Games Chronicle	4/5

Lego Batman: Legacy of the Dark Knight received "generally favorable" reviews from critics, according to review aggregator website Metacritic, and 97% of critics recommended the game, according to OpenCritic. Christian Donlan in Eurogamer praised Legacy of the Dark Knight's celebration of the Batman franchise with every iteration of the character having "a part to play". IGN's Simon Cardy compared the game's mixing of Batman media to "if several Batman kits were thrown onto the floor and jumbled up."

Game Informer was critical of the game's stealth mechanics for being "either far too simple, with enemies lined up with their backs to you, or simply intended as an entrance move". Jordan Middler of Video Games Chronicle compared the game's abundance of collectibles to a Ubisoft open world map filled with icons with the number of collectibles in Legacy of the Dark Knight feeling "very slightly excessive".

Independent journalist Nat Collazo wrote a review for Newsweek that praised the co-op gameplay, saying, "I'd like to think that if future LEGO games follow in the same footsteps as this one, co-op gaming is in good hands."

=== Awards ===
Year	Award	Category	Result	Ref.
2026	Golden Joystick Awards	Console Game of the Year	Nominated	
2026	The Game Awards 2026	Best Family Game	Pending	
