= Joker (Jack Napier) =

- Tim Burton's Batman character
- Jack Nicholson as the Joker in Batman
- First appearance: Batman (1989)
- Last appearance: Batman (1989)
- Based on: Joker by: Bob Kane; Bill Finger; Jerry Robinson
- Adapted by: Tim Burton; Sam Hamm; Warren Skaaren
- Portrayed by: Jack Nicholson: Hugo Blick (young)
- Voiced by: Ewan Bailey (Lego Batman: Legacy of the Dark Knight)

In-universe information
- Alias: Jack Napier
- Occupation: Mobster; Hitman (formerly)
- Home: Gotham City

Jack Napier, also known as the Joker, is a character and the main antagonist of Tim Burton's 1989 superhero film Batman, in which he is primarily portrayed by Jack Nicholson. Based on the DC Comics supervillain the Joker, this version is notable for being one of the first adaptations of the character to have a distinct alter ego and past. His name is a play on the word Jackanapes, as well as a reference to the names Jack Nicholson and Alan Napier, the latter having portrayed Alfred Pennyworth in the 1960s Batman TV series and died a year prior to the film's release.

Jack Napier is introduced as a psychopathic gangster and the right-hand man of Gotham City crime boss Carl Grissom. During a confrontation with the vigilante Batman, Napier falls into a vat of chemicals that bleaches his skin white, turns his hair green and lips red, and leaves him with a rictus grin; the resulting disfigurement drives him insane. Napier takes the name "Joker", kills Grissom, and begins terrorizing Gotham with "Smylex" — a deadly chemical that causes its victims to die laughing. After learning that Napier is responsible for the murder of his parents years ago, Batman kills Napier by using a grappling hook to attach his leg to a crumbling gargoyle, causing Napier to fall to his death.

Ever since Nicholson's portrayal in the film, the name Jack Napier has been used as an alias by various adaptations of the character, including Batman: The Animated Series and Batwoman, in which he is respectively voiced and portrayed by Mark Hamill and Nathan Dashwood, and the Murphyverse.

== Fictional character biography ==
=== Early life ===
Even as a child, Jack Napier was psychologically unstable, but extremely intelligent, showing an advanced knowledge of chemistry, art and science; he was also in and out of juvenile detention facilities for crimes such as arson, assault, and grand theft auto. Napier was charged with assault with a deadly weapon at age 15.

As a young man, Napier and his accomplice Joe Chill tried to rob Thomas and Martha Wayne in the alleyway behind the Monarch Theatre, and while Chill seeks to steal Martha's pearl necklace with no desire of harming anyone, Napier murders the couple for his sadistic pleasure, leaving their young son Bruce as the only survivor. Napier prepares to kill Bruce as well, saying to the boy, "You ever dance with the devil by the pale moonlight?" – his favorite thing to say with a maniacal grin right before killing someone. Chill entreats him to run before the police arrive, however, so Napier spares Bruce and leaves, saying in passing, "See ya around, kid."

=== Becoming the Joker ===
Years later, Napier moves up in the ranks of the Gotham City mafia, eventually becoming the right-hand-man of crime boss Carl Grissom (Jack Palance). He carries a deck of playing cards pierced from front to back by an earlier gunshot, and often performs sleight-of-hand with them or tosses them into his hat during idle moments. Napier privately dislikes Grissom, dismissing him as a "tired old man", and carries on an affair with his boss' moll Alicia Hunt (Jerry Hall). Grissom finds out about the affair and sets him up to be killed by Lt. Max Eckhardt (William Hootkins), a Gotham City Police Department cop on his payroll. The killing is to occur at Axis Chemicals, one of the mob's front companies, where Grissom sends Napier under the pretense of stealing incriminating documents.

Gotham City Police Commissioner James Gordon (Pat Hingle) and the masked vigilante Batman (Michael Keaton) intervene separately, disrupting the theft. Napier kills Eckhardt and shoots at Batman, who deflects the bullet with one of his gauntlets so that it ricochets back at Napier, wounding him in the face. Reeling from the pain, Napier stumbles and topples over a railing; Batman tries unsuccessfully to pull him up, and he falls into a vat of chemicals. He survives, but the chemicals turn his skin chalk-white, his lips red, and his hair green, while a botched attempt at plastic surgery leaves him with a permanent rictus grin that coincidentally makes him look like the Joker from his cards. Driven insane by his reflection, Napier – now calling himself "Joker" – kills Grissom and takes over his criminal empire.

Napier prior to his disfigurement

Styling himself as "The World’s First Fully-Functioning Homicidal Artist", Joker becomes obsessed with "outdoing" the Dark Knight, whom he believes is stealing the spotlight from him. Aided by his right-hand man Bob (Tracey Walter), Joker massacres the rest of Grissom's associates at a press conference and begins poisoning cosmetic products with "Smylex", a chemical agent that causes its victims to laugh hysterically as they die, leaving their corpses with a permanent smile. He also turns Alicia into one of his "masterpieces" by disfiguring her face and drugging her into submission; she eventually commits suicide, with Joker being unconcerned with her death, instead eyeing Vicki Vale (Kim Basinger).

Joker becomes obsessed with her, and attacks her while she meets with her boyfriend, billionaire Bruce Wayne – Batman's alter ego. Believing Wayne to be harmless, Joker taunts him with his signature line and shoots him. Wayne survives, having been wearing makeshift body armor under his jacket, and recognizes Joker as his parents' killer.

=== Downfall and death ===
Joker announces via television broadcast that he plans to give out $20 million at Gotham City's 200th anniversary parade, and challenges Batman to meet him there. Joker keeps his promise of giving away the money, before releasing an airborne toxic version of Smylex onto the crowd via parade floats, killing dozens of people. Batman arrives in the Batwing and removes the balloons before Joker uses a revolver to shoot the plane out of the sky, causing it to crash on the steps of the Gotham City Cathedral.

Joker kidnaps Vale and takes her to the roof of the cathedral, pursued by Batman. As they fight, each admits that he is responsible for the existence of the other. Batman knocks Joker off the roof, but Joker pulls him and Vale after himself and leaves them dangling from a ledge. As Joker attempts to escape via helicopter, Batman fires a cable that ties a heavy stone gargoyle to his ankle. The gargoyle breaks free of its mounting, dragging Joker off the helicopter rope ladder and causing him to fall to his death. Gordon finds Joker's corpse, with an activated laugh-box in the pocket of his tailcoat.

=== Legacy ===
Though gone, Joker continues to haunt Wayne and appears in his nightmares, particularly different versions of their confrontation in the cathedral where Joker hints that he knows Batman is Wayne. Wayne himself wrestles with the idea of informing Gordon that Napier was the one who killed his parents but decides against it to avoid the risk of exposing his identity as Batman.

As a result of the Joker's rampage, Wayne funds and opens the Smylex Ward of the Gotham General Hospital to treat the damaged survivors, one of which is Karlo Babić, who was affected by Smylex-laced products smuggled from Central City and rendered comatose. When Babić awakens, he discovers that he can alter his face and voice at will to impersonate anyone. The head of the ward, Dr. Hugh Auslander, who is actually Dr. Hugo Strange using an alias, subsequently manipulates Babić into posing as the Joker to cover his actions while digging up and hiding the actual Joker's corpse to make it look as if the Joker has returned from the dead. Batman and Gordon eventually piece the mystery together and realise that the new Joker is Babić, who subsequently betrays Strange and helps Batman foil his plan to unleash his own Hegemon gas on Gotham and hold the city to ransom.

After Strange is incarcerated and Babić turns himself in, the Joker's body is found and reburied. A while later, Wayne finds a letter from Norman Pinkus intended for the police which identified Napier and Chill as Thomas and Martha's killers, which Pinkus had actually deduced shortly after the murders, though Pinkus's mother Martina secretly hid the letter to avoid reprisals against her family. Wayne presents the letter to Gordon, finally closing the case.

== Production ==
=== Casting ===
Several actors were considered for the role of the Joker before Nicholson was cast. Robin Williams, Tim Curry, Willem Dafoe, Ray Liotta, David Bowie, and James Woods were all considered. Burton initially wanted to cast character actor John Glover (who would eventually play other DC characters; voicing Riddler in Batman: The Animated Series, and portraying Lionel Luthor in TV Series Smallville, Dr. Jason Woodrue in 1997 Batman & Robin, and Mr. Sivana in 2019 Shazam!). Burton also considered Brad Dourif; but ultimately the studio insisted on using a bankable movie star. John Lithgow met with Burton about the part, but during their discussion attempted to talk the budding director out of casting him, which would be something he would later regret. Lithgow was also director Joe Dante's first choice for the role of the Joker when he was attached to direct the film in the early 1980s. Jack Nicholson had been the studio's top choice since 1980. Jon Peters approached Nicholson as far back as 1986, during filming of The Witches of Eastwick. Peter Guber took Burton and Nicholson on a horseback riding excursion in Aspen to get the pair acquainted and convince him to take the role. Nicholson's contract featured an "off-the-clock" agreement, specifying the number of hours he could have off, and allowed him to take time off to attend Los Angeles Lakers home games.

Nicholson chose to take a lower fee up front in exchange for a higher percentage of the profits of the film, including toys and merchandise. As a result, instead of the $10 million he would normally have received, he made more than $50 million.

=== Design ===
As a part of Nicholson's contract, he was allowed to have approval over the makeup designer to create the look of the character. Nicholson chose Nick Dudman as his makeup designer. Dudman used an acrylic-based makeup for the bleached white face. Dudman cited the scene in the art gallery where Napier gets splashed with water by Vicki Vale as being the most difficult effect to achieve. To create the smile, Dudman did a regular face cast of Nicholson with a relaxed face, then asked him to do another one while pulling the largest grin he could muster. Dudman attempted to sculpt a smile that was always there but would take full effect when Nicholson smiled in the makeup; he also worked to ensure that the prosthetics wouldn't dilute Nicholson's face.

The character's origin in the film of falling into a vat of chemicals was inspired by the then-recent graphic novel Batman: The Killing Joke, written by Alan Moore. However, certain elements of the character's origin were changed, including making him having been a gangster rather than a failed stand-up comedian, and cutting the Red Hood persona from the character. Napier is seen to have always been a criminal, having been responsible for the deaths of Thomas and Martha Wayne, rather than Joe Chill, who instead serves as his accomplice.

=== Planned return ===
In the cancelled fifth film in the series, titled Batman Unchained, Nicholson was intended to return as the character via hallucinations from Scarecrow's Fear Toxins. The character of Harley Quinn was also rumored to have been involved in the story, and this adaptation was supposed to be the character's daughter, rather than girlfriend, who was seeking revenge on Batman for the death of her father. However, due to the critical and commercial failure of Batman & Robin, the project was scrapped.

The Batman series would be rebooted in 2005 by director Christopher Nolan with Batman Begins. The sequel to the film, The Dark Knight, featured the Joker portrayed by actor Heath Ledger. Ledger died before the film's release, and won the Academy Award for Best Supporting Actor posthumously. Nicholson was among many who praised Ledger's performance.

On April 11, 2024, it was announced that a new novel entitled Batman: Resurrection would be released which would tie-in to the Batman 1989 film. The premise of the novel teased the idea that in the wake of the aftermath of the movie's events, as Batman strove to dismantle the remnants of the Joker's organization, that the Joker himself, might in fact still be alive. However, it is actually Clayface (Basil Karlo) who impersonates the Joker after undergoing horrific mutation after the exposure of the Smylex compound under the manipulation of the novel's chief antagonist Hugo Strange, who is retroactively established as the Joker's scientist at Axis Chemicals, portrayed by Michael Balfour. Strange steals Napier's body so he can start the rumors of the Joker's survival and takes command of the Last Laugh, a criminal gang who modeled themselves after the Joker, by using Karlo. The real Joker had appeared in the novel via flashbacks, including that he had encountered the meek Selina Kyle outside the Flugelheim Museum after Batman's escape with Vicki Vale and was a criminal acquaintance of her employer Max Shreck.

== In other media ==
Since the film's release, many different interpretations of the character of the Joker have featured Jack Napier as his real name.

- Batman: The Animated Series and The New Batman Adventures, which took elements from the 1989 film, implies that Jack Napier could be either an alias or Joker's actual name.
- The design of the character was also used as an inspiration for Jeremiah Valeska, portrayed by Cameron Monaghan on the television series Gotham up until the series finale episode "The Beginning...".
- The Jack Napier version of Joker is featured in the TV series set in the Arrowverse, portrayed by Nathan Dashwood.
  - In the Arrowverse television crossover "Crisis on Infinite Earths", the setting of Batman and its sequel Batman Returns is established to exist on a parallel Earth to the Arrowverse series. During the first part of the crossover, it is stated on the headline of a newspaper read by Alexander Knox that "Batman Captures Joker" despite the latter supposedly having been dead for years since the film's events, implying that someone may have succeeded Napier as the Joker. Arrowverse co-developer Marc Guggenheim stated that this apparent continuity error was intentional by the showrunners, as they imagine that in the interim between the 1989 Batman film and "Crisis on Infinite Earths", Napier was either replaced by an impersonator or somehow was brought back to life.
- In the comic book series Batman: White Knight, the Joker uses the name "Jack Napier" after regaining his sanity.
- The Jack Napier version of Joker, with elements of The Dark Knight and Batman: Arkham versions of the Joker, appears in Lego Batman: Legacy of the Dark Knight, voiced by Ewan Bailey.

== Reception ==
Nicholson's portrayal as the Joker was acclaimed by fans and critics alike. For his performance as the character, Nicholson was nominated for the Golden Globe for Best Actor in a Musical or Comedy, but lost to Morgan Freeman in Driving Miss Daisy. Nicholson was also nominated for the BAFTA Award for Best Actor in a Supporting Role by the British Academy of Film and Television Arts but lost to Ray McAnally in My Left Foot. Nicholson's adaptation of the character was placed as the 45th best movie villain of all time on the American Film Institute's list of 100 Heroes and Villains; Michael Keaton's Batman placed as the 46th greatest hero on the same list.

=== Praises from future successors ===
Heath Ledger, who portrayed the character in Christopher Nolan's 2008 film The Dark Knight, cited Nicholson's portrayal as an influence on his interpretation of the character: "This character was too good to turn down. And yes, it would be a crime to attempt to [step in or to] follow Jack Nicholson's footpath that he so heavily stands into my memory of The Joker. I mean, I adore what he did and him in general." Mark Hamill, who voiced the character in Batman: The Animated Series, as well as in the Batman: Arkham video game series, has also cited Nicholson's adaptation of the character as an influence, but was told by show producers to avoid using Nicholson's Joker as a direct source of inspiration.

=== You ever dance with the devil in the pale moonlight? ===
The character's quote "You ever dance with the devil in the pale moonlight?" has become synonymous with the character as well as one of the character's most iconic phrases. The quote was nominated for the American Film Institute's 100 Movie Quotes list, but did not make the list. The quote was the title track for the unreleased song written by Prince for his soundtrack for the film. The track, titled "Dance with the Devil", was cut by Prince due to the darker tone of the song not fitting in with the rest of the upbeat songs on the soundtrack. It was replaced at the last second with "Batdance". Throughout the music videos for the singles released from the album, Prince was dressed as an amalgam of Nicholson's Joker and Keaton's Batman in a persona he titled Gemini. Nicholson's Joker can be heard in soundbytes during songs like "Batdance" and "Partyman".

== See also ==
- Joker in other media
  - Joker (The Dark Knight)
