= John Jackson Miller =

American writer (born 1968)

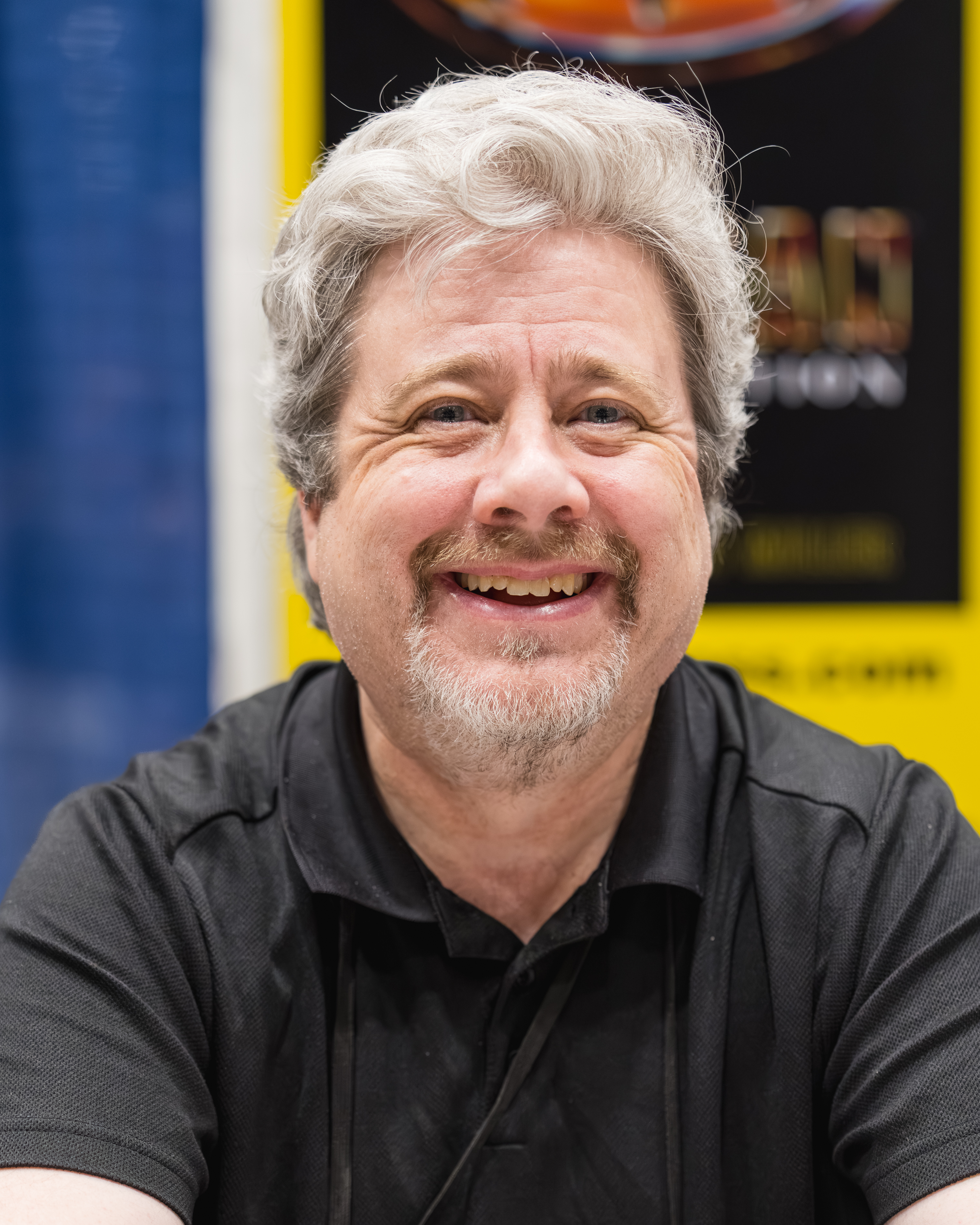
- Miller at GalaxyCon Oklahoma City in 2026
- Born: January 12, 1968 (age 58)
- Area: Writer

John Jackson Miller (born January 12, 1968) is an American science-fiction author, comic book writer, and commentator, known for his work on the Star Wars franchise and his research into comic book circulation history, as presented in the Standard Catalog of Comic Books series and the Comichron website.

== Early life ==
Miller attended high school with Nerdist founder and entertainer Chris Hardwick.

== Career ==
A collector of comics and publisher of mini-comics since childhood, Miller began as editor of the trade magazine Comics Retailer in 1993. Following the introduction of Magic: The Gathering, he added games to its coverage, changing the title to Comics & Games Retailer in 2001. In 1998, Miller was appointed managing editor of Comics Buyer's Guide.

His first professional comics work appeared in 2003 in Crimson Dynamo for Marvel Comics, which led to a run on Iron Man (#73/418 – 85/430). He writes a regular column called Longbox Manifesto for regular comics magazine Comics Buyer's Guide. In 2007, he launched Comichron, a website devoted to comic-book circulation history and research. Miller was hired as a writer for the video game Sword of the New World. In early 2008, he launched a fantasy webcomic with artist Chuck Fiala called Sword & Sarcasm.

In 2008, he wrote the Dark Horse comic-book adaptation of Indiana Jones and the Kingdom of the Crystal Skull. In 2009, he was announced as the scripter for Mass Effect: Redemption, the first comic-book series based on the video game series Mass Effect, launching in January 2010.

In 2013 he wrote his first novel in a non-licensed universe, Overdraft: The Orion Offensive, for 47North. The work was originally released over several weeks as a Kindle Serial.

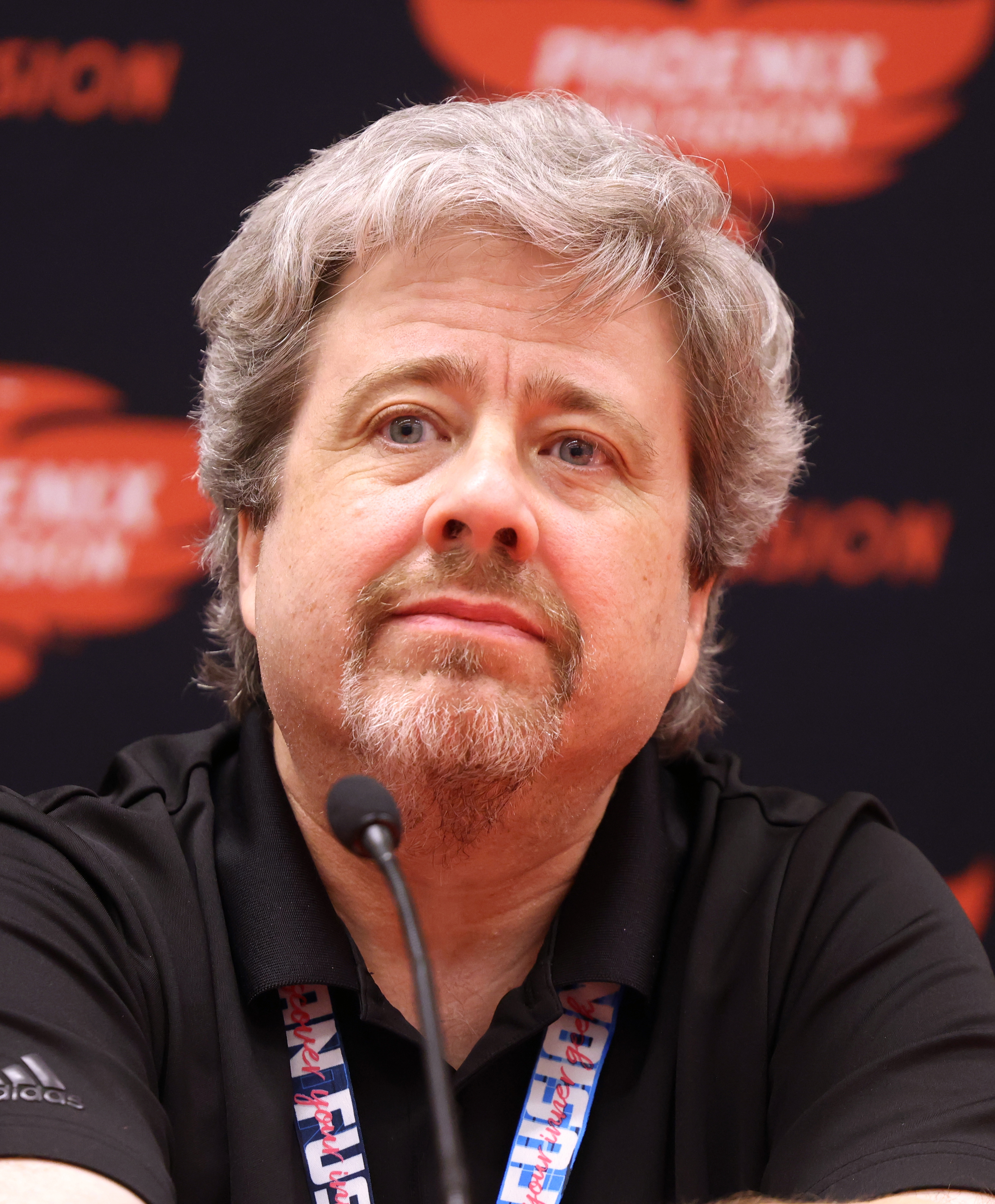
Miller in 2025

On April 11, 2024, it was announced exclusively by the web site Gizmodo that a new novel, Batman: Resurrection, set in the Tim Burton Batman universe would be written by Miller. The book is set in between the events of the Batman (1989) and its sequel, Batman Returns (1992). The book was released October 15, 2024.

On September 23, 2024, During an interview on the Epic Realms Podcast Miller spoke about how he had gotten the go ahead to write the Batman: Resurrection novel from having seen the Burton movie multiple times in the theater upon its release. In October 2024 it was revealed that Batman: Resurrection would be the first of a duology of novels; a sequel, titled Batman: Revolution, was later revealed by Miller and is scheduled to be released October 21, 2025.

=== Star Wars work ===
In 2005, Miller wrote a one-shot issue of Star Wars: Empire for Dark Horse Comics, featuring Darth Vader as the main character. Next year, as part of Dark Horse relaunching their Star Wars comic line, Miller started writing the ongoing Star Wars: Knights of the Old Republic comic series, a spin-off prequel of the video game of the same name. The series proved a major success among fans and lasted for 50 issues, before coming to a conclusion in 2010. In August 2008, Wizards of the Coast released a Knights of the Old Republic guidebook for its Star Wars Roleplaying Game, which Miller co-wrote.

In 2010 Miller began writing the Star Wars: Knight Errant comic series. Following Dark Horse changing the format of their series, it is not ongoing, but instead published as independent story arcs, separated from each other by several months. A Knight Errant novel was released in early 2011 by Del Rey, taking place between the first and second arcs of the comic series – this was Miller's first professional novel.

In October 2012, Del Rey announced that Miller would write Star Wars: Kenobi, a novel about Obi-Wan Kenobi's life on Tatooine. The book was released on August 27, 2013 in hardcover, and debuted at #12 on the New York Times hardcover bestseller list. Miller subsequently wrote Star Wars: A New Dawn, which was published in 2014, a prequel to the animated television series Star Wars Rebels, which premiered on Disney XD in fall the same year. It was the first novel of the new canon that replaced what is now known as Star Wars Legends. Miller also wrote the short story "The Ride", part of the short story collection Canto Bight that was released in December 2017 as part of a marketing program for the movie Star Wars: The Last Jedi. In September 2023, Del Rey revealed that Miller would write Star Wars: The Living Force, a novel focusing on the Jedi Council in the year before Star Wars: The Phantom Menace. The book was released on April 9, 2024.

== Bibliography ==
=== Star Wars ===
==== Novels ====
- Star Wars: Knight Errant (2011)
- Star Wars: Lost Tribe of the Sith: The Collected Stories (2012)
  - Lost Tribe of the Sith: Precipice
  - Lost Tribe of the Sith: Skyborn
  - Lost Tribe of the Sith: Paragon
  - Lost Tribe of the Sith: Savior
  - Lost Tribe of the Sith: Purgatory
  - Lost Tribe of the Sith: Sentinel
  - Lost Tribe of the Sith: Pantheon
  - Lost Tribe of the Sith: Secrets
  - Lost Tribe of the Sith: Pandemonium
- Star Wars: Kenobi (2013)
- Star Wars: A New Dawn (2014)
- Star Wars: The Living Force (2024)

==== Comics ====
- Star Wars: Empire #35
- Star Wars: Knights of the Old Republic #0–50
- Star Wars: Knights of the Old Republic: War #1–5
- Star Wars: Knight Errant: Aflame #1–5
- Star Wars: Knight Errant: Deluge #1–5
- Star Wars: Knight Errant: Escape #1–5
- Star Wars: Lost Tribe of the Sith—Spiral #1–5
- Star Wars Adventures: Annual #1

==== Short stories ====
- Labor Pains (2008)
- Interference (2008)
- The Secret Journal of Doctor Demagol (2010)
- Knight Errant: Influx (2012)
- Incognito (2013)
- Orientation (2015)
- Bottleneck (2015)
- Rites (2017)
- The Ride (2017)
- Lord Vader Will See You Now (2020)

=== Star Trek ===
- Star Trek: Titan: Absent Enemies (2014)
- Star Trek: The Next Generation: Takedown (2015)
- Star Trek: Prey: Hell's Heart (2016)
- Star Trek: Prey: The Jackal's Trick (2016)
- Star Trek: Prey: The Hall of Heroes (2016)
- Star Trek: Discovery: The Enterprise War (2019)
- Star Trek: Discovery: Die Standing (2020)
- Star Trek: Picard: Rogue Elements (2021)
- Star Trek: Strange New Worlds: The High Country (2023)

=== Batman ===
- Batman: Resurrection (2024)
- Batman: Revolution (2025)

=== Original fiction ===
==== Overdraft ====
- Human error (2012)
- Overdraft: The Orion Offensive (2013)
- Burnout (2015)

=== Comics ===
- Battlestar Galactica Classic (vol. 2) #0–5 (October 2018 – May 2019)
- Halo: Rise of Atriox #3, 5
- Indiana Jones and the Kingdom of the Crystal Skull #1–2
- Iron Man #73-85
- Mass Effect: Evolution #1–4
- Mass Effect: Invasion #1–4
- Mass Effect: Redemption #1–4

Preceded by Robin Laws	Iron Man writer 2003–2004	Succeeded by Mark Ricketts
