= Origin of Batman =

Events leading Bruce Wayne to become Batman

The origin of Batman depicts the events that cause a young Bruce Wayne to become Batman. The core event—the murder of Bruce's parents Thomas and Martha Wayne at the hands of Joe Chill—has remained fairly unchanged, but the aftermath and Bruce's journey to become Batman were not detailed until later years. The story first appeared in Detective Comics #33 (November 1939), and was retold in graphic novels such as Batman: Year One.

== Story ==
The character's origin was first depicted in Detective Comics #33 (November 1939), unfolding in a two-page story that establishes the brooding persona of Batman, a character driven by the murder of his parents. Written by Batman co-creator Bill Finger, it depicts a young Bruce Wayne witnessing his parents' murder at the hands of a mugger. Days later, the child vows that "by the spirits of my parents [I will] avenge their deaths by spending the rest of my life warring on all criminals".

Batman's origin is later expanded upon in Batman #47 (July 1948). Bruce Wayne is born to Dr. Thomas Wayne and his wife Martha, two wealthy and charitable Gotham City socialites. Bruce is brought up in Wayne Manor, and leads a happy and privileged existence until the age of eight, when his parents are killed by a small-time criminal named Joe Chill while on their way home from a movie theater. That night, Bruce swears an oath to spend his life fighting crime. He engages in intense intellectual and physical training, but realizes that these skills alone would not be enough. Bruce remarks: "Criminals are a superstitious cowardly lot, so my disguise must be able to strike terror into their hearts. I must be a creature of the night, black, terrible..." As if responding to his desires, a bat suddenly flies through the window, inspiring Bruce to craft the Batman persona.

Batman's origin is expanded upon once again in Detective Comics #235 (June 1956), which recasts the Waynes' murder not as a random mugging, but an assassination. In this story, Batman learns that mob boss Lew Moxon hired Chill to kill the Waynes as revenge for Thomas testifying against him 10 years prior.

== Analysis ==
Media scholars Roberta Pearson and William Uricchio, in their 1991 work The Many Lives of the Batman: Critical Approaches to a Superhero and His Media, wrote about the origin story and such events as the introduction of Robin, "Until recently, the fixed and accruing and hence, canonized, events have been few in number", a situation altered by an increased effort by later Batman editors such as Dennis O'Neil to ensure consistency and continuity between stories. After witnessing the murder of his parents Dr. Thomas Wayne and Martha Wayne as a child, he swore vengeance against criminals, an oath tempered by a sense of justice. Bruce Wayne trains himself physically and intellectually and crafts a bat-inspired persona to fight crime.

The driving force behind Bruce Wayne's character is his parents' murder and their absence. Bob Kane and Bill Finger discussed Batman's background and decided that "there's nothing more traumatic than having your parents murdered before your eyes". Despite his trauma, he sets his mind on studying to become a scientist and to train his body into physical perfection to fight crime in Gotham City as Batman, an inspired idea from Wayne's insight into the criminal mind.

In an interview promoting the release of The Dark Knight Rises, actor Christian Bale described the deaths of Bruce's parents as a source of arrested development: "The thing is, he is still that child, basically. [...] And the eternal problem that Alfred has with watching this guy who has no life. He's put his entire life on hold, because he still does [feel that pain]. He's got such fierceness in his mind and in his emotions that he just will not forget the pain of his parents. With most people it's like time heals all wounds, but I think with him it's like he doesn't want to forget it. He wants to maintain that anger that he felt at that injustice, but equally wants to present this very vacuous, soulless persona to Gotham so that no one will hopefully suspect him. They'll just think he's just a spoiled bastard".

Another of Batman's characterizations is that of a vigilante; in order to stop the evil that started with the death of his parents, he must sometimes break the law himself. Although manifested differently by being re-told by different artists, it is nevertheless that the details and the prime components of Batman's origin have never varied at all in the comic books, the "reiteration of the basic origin events holds together otherwise divergent expressions". The origin is the source of the character's traits and attributes, which play out in many of the character's adventures.

== Alterations ==
Due to the many writers who have worked on Batman stories, and constant references due to the central importance of the murder to the Batman mythos, many of the factors concerning the event have been altered:

- The murderer is consistently identified as Joe Chill, although the mythos alternates between versions where Batman learns the killer's identity, and ones in which he never does. Chill has also alternated between being a mugger who randomly selected the wealthy Waynes, and a hitman who murdered them intentionally (the former is the most common interpretation).
- The reason given for Chill leaving Bruce alive has varied. Sometimes it was because Chill could not bring himself to kill a child, and sometimes because Chill heard a policeman's whistle, police siren, or a rapidly approaching policeman. Often, it is because of the cold, frightening look that Bruce gave Chill as he kneels beside his dead parents; Chill panics and runs away. In the version presented in The Untold Legend of the Batman, Batman theorizes that Chill, a hitman hired by gangster Lew Moxon, deliberately left Bruce alive to report that his parents were killed by a robber.
- The movie that the Waynes went to see has fluctuated between the 1920 version of The Mark of Zorro starring Douglas Fairbanks and the 1940 version starring Tyrone Power and Basil Rathbone. A third version has starred "Tyrone Fairbanks". Tim Burton's Batman has the Waynes leaving The Monarch Theatre having seen Footlight Frenzy. Batman Begins has the Waynes leaving an opera house showing Mefistofele at the time of the murder, which they leave early due to Bruce being frightened by the bat-like costumes, giving Bruce the additional guilt of leading his parents to Chill. In The Dark Knight's Visual Guide it says that Bruce would rather have seen The Mark of Zorro at a movie house. In the 2016 film Batman v Superman: Dawn of Justice, the Wayne's exit a theater with the film Excalibur on the marquee, however a poster in the theater indicates that they may have just viewed The Mark of Zorro and therefore that Excalibur may just be coming soon to the theater.
- Actor Doug Bradley plays Joe Chill in the CW's Gotham Knights. In this version, Chill is set to be executed for the crime, but he claims he is only a patsy and may not be guilty of the crime. The Court of Owls tries to push behind the scenes for his death.

Thomas and Martha Wayne are notable as two comic book characters who have remained dead. Since his death, Thomas has only appeared in the Batman series in flashback and in the occasional out-of-body experience or hallucination. His most significant appearance in this latter category is in the miniseries Batman: Death and the Maidens by Greg Rucka. In this story, Batman ingests an elixir given to him by Ra's al Ghul, and believes he is having a conversation with his dead parents. In Bruce's hallucination, his parents disapprove of his costumed crusade, wishing that he would put their deaths behind him and move on with his life. As she and Thomas depart, they assure Bruce that just because the passing of time has lessened his grief does not mean that he no longer loves them. As a result, Bruce is able to accept that he is Batman because he chooses to be, not because he has to be.

Consistent elements have included Thomas Wayne being murdered by a pistol, and Martha Wayne's pearl necklace being torn, with the pearls falling into the gutter. The murder takes place at 10:47 p.m. Batman accesses the Batcave through Wayne Manor by turning the hands of a grandfather clock to this time. In comic book continuity, the date of the murder has varied, although the 26th of June and September, the current canonical date, are the most significant examples varied.

Batman: Dark Victory depicts the Wayne murders as the main cause of much of the corruption and crime in Gotham City: once it became clear that even wealthy, important people could be murdered so easily, citizens began to lose faith in the police, and the police themselves started to lose faith in their importance, leading to corruption within the force.

Batman #430 includes a scene in which, on the day of his and Martha's murder, Thomas Wayne is having trouble with some investments, and is going to sell short. Bruce thinks that he needs some exercise to take his mind off of it and so offers to play catch with him, but Thomas angrily says no, striking him across the face. A hurt and resentful Bruce declares to his mother that he wishes Thomas was dead. Thomas takes the family to a movie to make it up to his son, and in an ironic twist of fate, Thomas and Martha are murdered that night. Bruce feels guilty for years afterward.

== Alternative versions ==
In the alternate history setting of Superman: Red Son, the unnamed parents of Batman are Soviet dissidents gunned down in front of their son by NKVD commissar Pyotr Roslov. This leads to their son growing up to become Batman, a crusader against the Soviet government and its leader, Superman.

In the crossover story arc Flashpoint, which creates an alternate reality, Bruce Wayne is the only victim of Joe Chill's mugging. Thomas Wayne becomes this reality's Batman, using a gun and killing his opponents. Martha Wayne, driven insane by grief, becomes the Joker. This version of Thomas travels to the prime reality and tries to force Bruce to abandon his life as Batman, but Bruce rejects this attempt; the idea is explored that Thomas and Bruce each ultimately attempted to become Batman as an elaborate suicide attempt, but where Thomas was never able to fully move on from what happened, Bruce has been able to heal by forming a new family from his various allies.

== In other media ==
=== Television ===
- In 1985, the final version of Hanna-Barbera's Super Friends animated television series, The Super Powers Team: Galactic Guardians depicted Batman's origin for the first time in any other media outside the comics. In the episode entitled "The Fear", Gotham City is held in the grip of terror by Scarecrow's arsenal of Fear Transmitters. Scouring Gotham in search of Scarecrow, Batman is paralyzed with fright when he finds himself in the middle of Crime Alley, where his parents Thomas Wayne and Martha Wayne were murdered years prior. Taking advantage of the situation, Scarecrow intends to keep Batman trapped in Crime Alley forever by using a captured Robin and Wonder Woman as bait, forcing the Caped Crusader to purge himself of his lifelong fears once and for all.
- In the DC Animated Universe (DCAU), the death of the Waynes is depicted in flashbacks and hallucinations. Most notably, in the Justice League Unlimited episode "For the Man Who Has Everything", an adaptation of the comic story of the same name, Batman is temporarily put under the effects of the alien plant Black Mercy and hallucinates that their deaths never happened, with Thomas Wayne successfully fighting off Joe Chill. Wonder Woman pulls the Black Mercy off Bruce, forcing him to relive his parents' deaths before being brought back to reality.
- The Batman: The Brave and the Bold episode "Chill of the Night!" loosely adapts The Untold Legend of the Batman, with Joe Chill assassinating Thomas and Martha under orders from Lew Moxon as revenge for Thomas foiling a robbery by Moxon and putting him in prison. Years later, Batman learns Chill's identity from a dying Moxon, who regrets orphaning Bruce, as he only intended for Thomas to die and not Martha. The Phantom Stranger and Spectre make a wager as to how Batman will use this information, with each showing Batman visions of the events leading up to his parents' deaths. Batman eventually finds Chill, now an arms dealer, and beats him before privately revealing his identity. Chill panics and begs for help from other supervillains, but they turn on him for creating Batman. Batman attempts to save him, but Chill is killed by falling rubble in the chaos.
- The 2014 television series Gotham depicts a re-imagining of Batman, featuring a twelve-year-old Bruce Wayne (portrayed by David Mazouz) whose parents are shot while exiting the Monarch Theatre screening of the 1920 version of The Mark of Zorro. This version includes a teenage Selina Kyle (Camren Bicondova) witnessing the crime from a distance. Bruce is assisted by Gotham City Police Department detective James Gordon (Ben McKenzie) in finding the murderer of Bruce's parents. Eventually, Bruce discovers the criminal Patrick "Matches" Malone had murdered the Waynes and was hired by an intermediary contractor known as "The Lady", who put out a hit for Thomas and Martha Wayne on the orders of Hugo Strange. Gordon shuts down The Lady's criminal empire and learns Malone's identity. After being confronted by Bruce, Malone commits suicide. Strange is arrested for his crimes, only to escape federal custody and goes on the run. In the series finale, Bruce becomes a bat-dressed vigilante after leaving Gotham.
- In the Harley Quinn episode "Batman Begins Forever", the murder of Thomas and Martha Wayne is depicted as an infinite loop inside Bruce Wayne's mind as a reversed repressed memory. This is a satirical reference to the infinite amount of times their murder has been portrayed in various media.

=== Film ===
- In Tim Burton's Batman, Joe Chill robs Bruce Wayne's parents before his associate Jack Napier shoots them both. Later in the film, Napier becomes the Joker after his first encounter with Batman; Bruce recalls the memory of Chill's cries and realizes that Napier was the murderer of his parents. The two foes later realize that they "made each other". The fate of Chill in the Burton-verse is unknown.
- In Christopher Nolan's The Dark Knight trilogy, Bruce Wayne's parents Thomas and Martha were murdered by low life mugger Joe Chill, who is arrested soon after. Fourteen years after the murder, Chill is paroled for testifying against his cellmate Carmine Falcone, who has Chill killed. Bruce decides to leave Gotham to train, meeting the League of Shadows, led by Ra's al Ghul. When he refuses to kill a man as his final task, Bruce burns down the League of Shadows headquarters, killing Ra's, and escapes. He returns to Gotham and uses his training to become the vigilante Batman and rid Gotham of its rapid crime. He later learns that his mentor, Henri Ducard, is Ra's al Ghul, and the one in their HQ was a decoy. Bruce soon learns from Ra's that he and the League of Shadows were indirectly responsible for the death of his parents and that they caused a decline of Gotham as they perceived the city as corrupt.
- In Zack Snyder's Batman v Superman: Dawn of Justice, Bruce Wayne's parents Thomas and Martha were murdered by Joe Chill when he was nine years old. While seemingly hesitant, Thomas Wayne threw the first punch, attempting to beat back the mugger, but was quickly shot and mortally wounded. Stunned, his mother joined the fight, attempting to wrestle the gun away, but she was also shot. With his last dying breath, Bruce's father called out his mother's name in a whisper while the mugger ran off into the night. From then on, Bruce was raised by the Wayne family's bodyguard, Alfred Pennyworth. During the funeral of his parents, Bruce, overcome with grief, broke away from the service. As he ran, he stumbled across a decrepit area of the estate and fell into a cavern filled with numerous bats. This would later inspire him to use that fear to battle the criminal elements that took his parents' lives. After Batman defeated Superman in combat, Batman moved to kill him with a kryptonite spear; Superman pleaded with him to "save Martha", causing Batman to pause in confusion and anger. When Lois Lane intervenes and explains that Superman meant his own mother, Batman relents and sets out to rescue Martha Kent.
- In the 2019 film Joker, the Wayne family exits the theatre (which is showing Blow Out and Zorro, The Gay Blade) and are caught in the middle of a riot spurred by the Joker's actions. Thomas Wayne takes Martha and Bruce through an alley for safety, where a rioter shoots him and Martha dead to strike back against the powerful in Gotham. Notably, Thomas is depicted in the film as being indifferent and hostile to those protesting the dismal living conditions in Gotham City, and the question of his paternity over Arthur Fleck (the real name of the man who became the Joker), although since many events are shown through Fleck's eyes the veracity of this is uncertain as Fleck is shown to be delusional at various points in the film, such as hallucinating a false relationship with his neighbour.

== Reception ==
Newsarama places Batman's origin as number two of the greatest origin story in comic books, describing it as "one of the most tragic in all of comic books, [setting] the stage for countless copycats using the trope of a hero who suffers a great injustice, and spends the rest of his life seeking vengeance". Matthew Byrd of Screen Rant placed Batman's origin in the number one spot of greatest comic book origins.

== See also ==
- Origin of Superman

== Sources ==
- Pearson, Roberta E.; Uricchio, William, eds. (1991). The Many Lives of the Batman: Critical Approaches to a Superhero and His Media. New York and London: Routledge and BFI Publishing. ISBN 0415903475.
