= Batman: Three Jokers =

2020 Batman comic book limited series

- Cover art of Batman: Three Jokers (September 2020) featuring The Clown Joker (left), The Criminal Joker (center), and The Comedian Joker (right); art by Jason Fabok and Brad Anderson.

Publication information
- Publisher: DC Comics
- Format: Limited series
- Genre: Superhero fiction
- Publication date: August – October 2020
- No. of issues: 3
- Main character(s): Batman; Joker; Red Hood; Batgirl; Joe Chill

Creative team
- Written by: Geoff Johns
- Artist(s): Jason Fabok; Brad Anderson

Collected editions
- Batman: Three Jokers: ISBN 978-1779500236

Batman: Three Jokers is an American comic book limited series published by DC Comics. It is a spiritual successor to Batman: The Killing Joke and Batman: A Death in the Family. The three-issue storyline was written by Geoff Johns and illustrated by Jason Fabok and Brad Anderson, began in August and concluded in October 2020. In Three Jokers, Batman, Batgirl and Red Hood follow a lead on the Joker, who appears to have been three different men all along.

The Three Jokers storyline was published under DC Black Label, an imprint allowing writers to present unique takes on DC characters for a mature audience.

== Premise ==
Three Jokers follows Batman as he investigates several ongoing crimes by the Joker occurring simultaneously, which may be related to the possibility that there is more than one Joker operating in Gotham City.

The three Jokers in this story are referred to by simple titles:

- The Criminal, the pragmatic, philosophical, surprisingly serious Joker from the Golden Age, who is the most methodical of the trio and is initially implied to be their leader. Claiming that laughing actually hurts him, his personality and demeanor are reminiscent of the Joker's earliest comic book appearances. His ultimate plan is to transform Joe Chill into 'a better Joker' worthy of being Batman's arch-nemesis, given that Chill's act of murdering Bruce Wayne's parents caused the most pain in Batman's life.
- The Clown, the campy, colorful, goofy prankster Joker from the Silver Age, who is the most anarchistic of the trio. He is implied to be the Joker responsible for bludgeoning and killing Jason Todd in Batman: A Death in the Family. He has a sidekick named Gagsworth A. Gagsworthy, and uses elaborate pranks in his crimes with the simple goal of causing chaos.
- The Comedian, the depraved, demented, sadistic psychopath Joker from the Bronze and Modern Age, who is the most cunning and evil of the trio. He is the Joker who shot and paralyzed Barbara Gordon in Batman: The Killing Joke. Behind his warped sense of humor and eerie smile, he is a malicious monster who feels nothing but spite for what he sees as a cruel, irredeemable world. He is implied to be the original Joker, and orchestrates a series of events that allow him to replace Joe Chill as Batman's greatest pain.

== Prelude ==
During the "Darkseid War" storyline, Batman sits on the Mobius Chair (a time-space/dimensional vehicle operated by the New God Metron) with Hal Jordan observing. First, to test the chair, Batman asked it who killed his parents – it answered correctly: "Joe Chill". Next, Batman asked the Mobius Chair what is the Joker's real name, and is shocked by the results. It is later revealed that the Mobius Chair told Batman there were three Jokers, which he later brought up to Hal when he asked about it. Batman states that he is going to have to look into that later.

== Plot ==
Batman sets out to find the Joker when he learns he has killed the last members of the Moxon crime family. Batgirl (Barbara Gordon) joins the pursuit after learning he also killed a famous comedian. Red Hood (Jason Todd) resumes his hunt of the Clown Prince of Crime as well. Batman concludes that the Joker used the murders as a diversion: his real plan was stealing a truck full of his Joker-turning chemicals.

The Joker driving the stolen truck, The Clown, meets with The Comedian and The Criminal to discuss their plan to set up chemical vats and find candidates in order to create a fourth new Joker. Batman, Batgirl, and Red Hood's investigations lead them to an aquarium where they encounter The Clown, whom Batman subdues and leaves for Batgirl and Red Hood to guard while he organizes a transport to Arkham Asylum. Jason kills The Clown after being provoked by him, enraging Barbara.

Batgirl tells Batman about Jason's actions. She wants Bruce to stop him, but Bruce tells her there is nothing they can do: if Jason confesses to the murder, Batgirl would be arrested as an accomplice and unmasked, as she was a witness. They go to Blackgate Penitentiary: at the crime scene of the Joker's murder of a judge, Batman found the fingerprints of one particular criminal: his parents' killer Joe Chill, who has terminal cancer.

Red Hood searches for the Joker at an abandoned sports club. Inside, he finds multiple bodies bathed in a Joker-turning chemicals-filled pool. Jason is captured by the Jokers, who tell him they are searching for someone to turn into a better version of themselves to antagonize Batman. All the victims they killed were tests for their final product, but to them, they were not good enough. The Jokers torture Jason to near death and leave him for Barbara and Bruce to find. Broken and embittered, Jason snaps at Batman, blaming him for all the pain in his life. Barbara takes Jason to her apartment, where they emotionally confide with one another about their similar tragedies. They end up kissing, but Barbara pulls away from him. Elsewhere, The Comedian kidnaps Joe Chill.

Batman analyzes the Jokers, believing that one of these is the original and created the other two. Batman learns of Joe Chill's kidnapping and finds unsent apology letters to Bruce Wayne that the guilt-ridden Chill wrote long before he got sick. Batman, Batgirl, and Red Hood head to the condemned Monarch Theater as inside the letters Batman finds an invitation by the Joker. Inside they face The Criminal, who intends to turn Chill into the new Joker because of his role in the Dark Knight's creation. Batman saves Chill, who has learned his secret identity and thinks he would deserve it if he chose to take his life, but Batman forgives him. The Criminal is then suddenly shot in the head by The Comedian.

Batman escorts the arrested Comedian (the real Joker) to Arkham Asylum. Jason approaches Barbara romantically, but she again rejects him. The Joker reveals he is aware of Batman and his allies' secret identities; he had convinced the other two Jokers that Joe Chill would make a perfect fourth one, understanding he would never be able to commit a crime more tragic than what Chill did to Bruce, and he alone wants to be Bruce's greatest pain until the day they die together, which was accomplished when Bruce forgave Chill.

Jason leaves a letter for Barbara, where he confesses his love for her and is ready to abandon the Red Hood identity for good, if it means having a chance to be with her. Barbara never reads the letter, as it is collected by a janitor outside her apartment. In the aftermath, Bruce comforts Chill at his deathbed. Bruce reveals to Alfred that he has known the Joker's true name all along, discovering it shortly after their first encounter. It is also revealed that the Joker's pregnant wife Jeannie is alive, having faked her death then taken to Alaska where she now lives with her son as part of a witness protection program. Bruce explains that the Joker's name must never be known, because if the world ever found out about his family, it would be national news and they would be targeted, either by the Joker himself or by someone seeking vengeance against the criminal.

== Canonicity ==
Geoff Johns, the writer of the book, stated at DC FanDome in September 2020 that he felt the story was "in continuity". He also debunked a theory that claimed the three Jokers were from different realities.

In the same month, Jason Fabok, the artist of the series, said that the canonicity of the series was subject to interpretation: "I'm not a continuity hound personally. I just want a good story. All my favorite stories are out of continuity so that appeals to me more. If this was in continuity we would have had our hands tied and forced to do certain things".

== Reception ==
On the review aggregator Comic Book Roundup, the series has a score of 8.5 out of 10 based on 61 reviews.
