= Chill of the Night! =

- Batman: The Brave and the Bold episode
- The episode's title card
- Episode no.: Season 2 Episode 11
- Directed by: Michael Chang
- Written by: Paul Dini
- Production code: 211
- Original air date: April 9, 2010

Episode chronology
← Previous "The Power of Shazam!"	Next → "Gorillas in Our Midst!"

"Chill of the Night!" is the eleventh episode of the second season of Batman: The Brave and the Bold, and the 37th episode overall. The plot follows Batman as he comes closer to confronting Joe Chill, the man who killed his parents and unbeknownst to him, his decision on how to handle Chill will not only determine the criminal's fate but his own. This episode is featured as an extra on the "DC Showcase Original Shorts Collection" animated DVD feature, and has been listed as one of Bruce Timm's favorite episodes.

== Background ==
The episode is a re-telling of Batman's origin story. Paul Dini, writer of many of the scripts for Batman: The Animated Series, wrote the script for this episode. Michael Chang directed the episode. The episode first aired on April 9, 2010. People who voiced characters in Batman: The Animated Series and who acted in the 1960s Batman television series returned to voice characters in this episode: Kevin Conroy (the voice of Batman) voices the Phantom Stranger, Mark Hamill (the voice of the Joker) voices Spectre, Richard Moll (the voice of Two-Face) voices Lew Moxon and also reprises his roles of Two-Face in that same episode, Adam West (who played Batman in the 1960s Batman television series and later voiced the Gray Ghost) voices Thomas Wayne, Julie Newmar (who played Catwoman in the 1960s Batman television series) voices Martha Wayne, and Jennifer Hale also reprises her role of Zatanna from Justice League Unlimited (which was in continuity with Batman: The Animated Series). There are more scenes that are in shadows than in previous episodes, and Batman's costume is noticeably darker. The episode has images and sequences that are a homage to Batman: The Animated Series. The comic book limited series Untold Legend of the Batman is the basis for this episode. Before the episode aired, Scott Thill of Wired said that this episode promises a return to Batman's murderous darkness. In a video interview about this episode for Comic Book Movie, producer Michael Jelenic said that Paul Dini will be working on a third episode (the first one featured Bat-Mite).

== Plot ==
In flashbacks, the young Bruce Wayne watches in horror as his parents Thomas and Martha Wayne are murdered by a gunman. That night, he swears to avenge them by spending the rest of his life battling crime. As he grows up, he studies criminology and martial arts, eventually becoming Batman.

In the present, the Spectre and the Phantom Stranger learn Batman will soon encounter his parents' killer and debate what the former will do to him. They eventually make a wager, with the Phantom Stranger believing Batman will uphold justice while the Spectre feels he will give in to vengeance. Meanwhile, Batman disguises himself as a priest and visits Lew Moxon, a dying gangster who ordered the hit on the Waynes, to learn the killer's name. Moxon expresses regret over making their son an orphan as he only meant to have Thomas killed; not Martha. Before he dies, Moxon says "chill". Misinterpreting this, Batman heads to a bar to interrogate other criminals gathering in memory of Moxon, but they claim not to know anything.

After Batman threatens to kill one of them, the Phantom Stranger intervenes; sending Batman back in time to a charity costume party that his parents attended. While there, Batman reunites with them before joining forces with Thomas to stop Moxon's gang from robbing the party. Batman recognizes one of Moxon's thugs as his parents' killer and pursues him. However, the Spectre stops him, wondering what he will do once he identifies the killer. When Batman struggles to answer him, the Spectre shows him a meeting between the thug, "Chill", and an incarcerated Moxon. When Chill offers to seek revenge on the Waynes for him, Moxon casually agrees.

The Spectre returns Batman to the Batcave, where the latter learns further that Joe Chill has become an arms dealer. Batman interrupts his latest sale, fighting off Chill's supervillain clients before privately cornering him and unmasking himself. With Chill at his mercy, the Phantom Stranger persuades Batman to stop since Chill is beaten while the Spectre argues that Chill will expose his secret identity should Batman spare him. Ultimately, Batman does so. Panicked, Chill begs the villains for protection, revealing that he is indirectly responsible for Batman's existence. Upon hearing this, the villains attack him. Though Batman saves Chill from them, the Spectre secretly manipulates the ensuing chaos to ensure that Chill is killed by falling rubble. The Phantom Stranger congratulates Batman on making the right choice before questioning the Spectre's role in Chill's death.

== Voice cast ==
- Diedrich Bader as Bruce Wayne / Batman, Solomon Grundy
  - Zachary Gordon as young Bruce Wayne
- Adam West as Thomas Wayne
- Julie Newmar as Martha Wayne
- Kevin Conroy as Phantom Stranger
- Mark Hamill as Spectre
- Richard Moll as Lew Moxon, Two-Face
- Jennifer Hale as Zatanna, Poison Ivy
- Jeff Bennett as Joker, Abra Kadabra, Mobster
- Peter Onorati as Joe Chill

== Reception ==
The episode received mostly positive reviews and is often regarded as the show's best episode. Joe Oesterle, of Mania, said that this episode ranks among the best of The Brave and the Bold, proving this show is as capable of presenting more than one version of Batman. Dan Phillips, of IGN, said that this episode is the best in the series. The founder of Batman-On-Film praised the episode for its cast.
