= Batman: Holy Terror =

1991 comic

- Cover of Batman - Holy Terror one-shot

Publication information
- Publisher: Elseworlds (DC Comics)
- Publication date: 1991

Creative team
- Written by: Alan Brennert
- Artist: Norm Breyfogle
- Letterer: Bill Oakley
- Colorist: Lovern Kindzierski
- Editor(s): Dennis O'Neil; Kelley Puckett

Batman: Holy Terror is an Elseworlds one-shot comic published by DC Comics in 1991. The story is written by Alan Brennert and illustrated by Norm Breyfogle. The graphic novel is significant in that it was the first to bear the Elseworlds logo.

== Plot summary ==
The story is an alternate history whose point of divergence came in 1658. Oliver Cromwell recovered from sepsis and lived until 1668, consolidating the Protectorate of England and its sister theocracies in the North American colonies. In the late 20th century, the United States of America is a "Commonwealth" run by a corrupt theocratic government. World-building is established in an expository scene narrated by newscaster Victoria Vale. In 1991, the Commonwealth is waging a war of conquest across South America, under the command of General North (possibly Oliver North), and Brazilian President Jorge Amado has committed suicide as his country was being overrun. Back home, industrialist Oliver Queen is hanged for publishing forbidden "pornographic" works by Isaac Bashevis Singer.

Twenty-two years after the death of his parents, Bruce Wayne is planning to join the clergy when he is visited by his friend James Gordon. Gordon was the inquisitor who investigated Thomas and Martha Wayne's murder at the hands of Joe Chill, and has come to tell Bruce the truth about what happened. Their deaths were not a random mugging, but a state-planned execution. Despite Thomas' position as physician to the Commonwealth Privy Council, both were anti-government radicals who ran a clinic for the victims of the government's brutality and brainwashing. Bruce consults his father's coworker Charles McNider, who confirms the truth about his parents, and that of many others killed by the state. McNider, a broken man who lost both his wife and his eyesight, tells Bruce about a government conspiracy called "the Green Man", but warns Bruce that nothing good has come of fighting the system.

Bruce starts a crusade to hunt down those who killed his parents. After his ordination as a priest, Bruce discovers a demon costume his father once wore in a morality play: a garb shaped like a bat. Hacking into government files, he hunts down one of the Privy Council members for information, and learns that the ones who arranged the death sentence were the Star Chamber, the highest court in the government.

Bruce finds the Star Chamber's location, as well as a government facility filled with human test subjects. He helps free a man with super-speed named Barry Allen, and learns that the others are men and women who were unsuccessfully put through the same gene splicing process that gave Barry his speed abilities. Among these is Arthur Curry, who has been rendered nearly catatonic. The two are attacked by a witch converted to the state, a woman who pronounces spells backwards. During the scuffle with this witch, a test subject is killed by collateral damage, and Barry is killed by Saul Erdel, who negates the aura that protects him while he is running. Erdel has another of his agents, Matthew Hagen, capture Bruce and bring him to see "Project Green Man". This was an extraterrestrial child found in a rocket ship found by a "god-fearing" couple in Kansas, who was raised by the state and studied before being killed with an irradiated green rock when he became too difficult to control. Enraged, Bruce breaks free and attacks Erdel. Bruce tricks Hagen into falling into liquid hydrogen, causing him to freeze solid, at which point Bruce smashes Hagen with a hammer. Erdel tries to shoot at Bruce, but the bullets ricochet off the alien's corpse, killing him.

Bruce enters the Star Chamber and confronts its caretaker about his parents. The man tells him that everyone ever sentenced to death by the Chamber has been put to death by secret ballot, with no records kept of each individual vote, as a means of assuring members that the state is the source of their power. Bruce no longer finds a reason to kill the caretaker, because it was the system that was responsible for the deaths of his parents. He vows to bring it down once and for all, no matter how long it will take.

With a new cause, and motivated by God, Bruce continues to serve fight against the government as the Batman, but wonders if everything might have been different if his parents had truly been the victims of a random mugging years ago.

== Characters ==
- Batman: Reverend Bruce Wayne of Gotham, who becomes the Batman to take down the government responsible for murdering his parents.
- James Gordon: An inquisitor who was the investigator for the deaths of Thomas and Martha Wayne. James learned who was responsible, but was threatened by his superiors to overlook it. Twenty years later, James finally told Bruce the truth to ease his guilty conscience.
- Joseph Chill: A convict who was released by the government to kill Thomas and Martha Wayne and make it look like a mugging, he dies in a prison fight after James Gordon finally identifies him.
- Thomas and Martha Wayne: Parents of Bruce Wayne, Thomas worked as personal physician to the Privy Council, but both he and his wife worked against the government in secret.
- Barry Allen: A former forensics expert who gained super-speed abilities in a freak lab accident over a year ago, he is turned over to Saul Erdel as an experiment.
- Saul Erdel: A Jewish scientist who oversaw "Project Green Man", who is portrayed as an amoral and mildly sadistic character. He is indifferent to the suffering of the Jews, whose travel movements and reproductive freedoms are greatly limited.
- The Green Man: An alien man who was a ward of the state for many years, until they finally had to kill him with a green mineral for being too difficult and powerful to handle.
- The Witch: An unnamed witch who spoke spells backwards, she was converted to the state and tried to kill Barry Allen and Bruce.
- Charles McNider: A blind old man who was friends with Thomas and Martha Wayne, Charles was blinded by an agent of the state, and later lost his wife, Myra.
- Alan Scott: A friend of Charles McNider who was executed for running an underground radio station and he does not appear directly.
- Carter and Shiera Hall: Friends of Charles McNider, they were archaeologists who tried to smuggle weapons into the country and were executed for it. Neither appear directly.
- Rex Tyler: Friend of Charles McNider, Tyler was executed for manufacturing drugs for the Waynes' clinic. He does not appear directly.
- Alfred Pennyworth: Former butler to the Waynes, he leaves when Bruce sells Wayne Manor to join the clergy.
- Lemuel Brown: Former member of the Privy council which Thomas Wayne worked for. After Bruce interrogates him, he dresses Lemuel in a maid's uniform to discredit any testimony he might give regarding the Batman's existence.
- Judson Caspian: A bishop who Bruce works with in the clergy, Bruce refers to him as a good and honorable man, and hates having to betray his trust to get information on the state.
- Arthur Curry: One of the many human guinea pigs belonging to the state, Arthur could breathe underwater and had limited telepathic abilities. They succeeded in breaking him, just not in the way they wanted. They even tried mating him with a mermaid named Lori.
- Lori, a mermaid who mated with Arthur in an experiment, and died giving birth, she does not appear directly.
- Unnamed mermaid, daughter of Arthur and Lori, this character is killed by a lightning bolt which the backwards-talking witch aimed at Bruce and Barry.
- Terry, Corinne, Gus, and Joshua: Four prisoners who Erdel subjected to the same chemicals that gave Barry his powers, all four have developed mutated forms of Barry's speedster abilities but are physically or mentally unwell due to disturbing and uncontrollable side effects of their powers.
- Matthew Hagen: Dr. Erdel's mindless servant, he was once a smuggler who was exposed to protoplasm, which turned him into a malleable clay-like being.
- Victoria Vale: An anchorwoman for Newsbreak.
- Oliver Queen: An industrialist who was hanged for sedition and publishing banned books.

== Reception ==
IGN said: "Though there are some interesting points about how the state attempts to mimic God's will, there's far too much exposition and far too little intrigue... While Holy Terror won't go down as the worst Batman Elseworlds tale, it certainly won't be making any "Best" lists. The cover makes for an awesome poster, but the interiors fail to excite the imagination".

== See also ==
- List of Elseworlds publications
