= Batman: Dark Knight Dynasty =

1997 graphic novel

Cover of Batman: Dark Knight Dynasty HC, art by Gerald Brom

Batman: Dark Knight Dynasty is a graphic novel published by DC Comics under the Elseworlds banner in 1997. It is written by Mike W. Barr and illustrated by Scott Hampton, Gary Frank with Cam Smith, and Scott McDaniel with Bill Sienkiewicz.

The story follows a feud between the Wayne family and the immortal Vandal Savage, a feud which starts in the 13th century and ends in the 24th century. The story is split into three parts, Dark Past (illustrated by Hampton) which features a knight named Joshua Wainwright during the Crusades, Dark Present (illustrated by Frank) which features Bruce Wayne in the 20th century as Batman, and Dark Future (illustrated by McDaniel), which features Brenna Wayne as Batwoman.

== Plot summary ==
=== Dark Past ===
Sir Joshua Wainwright, a crusader for the Knights Templar in the year 1222, battles the evil Vandal Savage, who steals a shipment of gold and tries to bring a mysterious meteor crashing to Earth. Savage, an immortal, gained his immortality from the meteor, and is trying to bring it back so he may gain even more power. After stopping Savage in this time period by hurling him into the sphere he was using to draw the meteor to Earth, Joshua swears an oath that he and his family will now and forevermore be sworn enemies of Savage and will prevent his mad schemes to protect the future. Joshua himself is subsequently tried for heresy and burnt at the stake, due to the impossible nature of his story causing the Templar leaders to assume that he stole the gold himself. Savage, in disguise as a Templar leader, personally condemns Joshua and oversees his burning, wistfully commenting that he always wins, and so can take little joy in his victory.

=== Dark Present ===
Bruce Wayne, the son of Thomas and Martha Wayne in the 20th century, is shaken as his parents are killed on his wedding day; the gunman who would have killed them beforehand was scared away by 'Valentin Sinclair', Vandal Savage's modern alias. Discovering that they were murdered after analyzing camera footage of the deaths, but unwilling to risk his wife's life by investigating himself, Bruce, influenced by a painting of his ancestor Joshua Wainwright, creates a costume bearing a bat emblem and becomes the Dark Knight, the Batman, in order to avenge his parents' death. When Savage takes the Wayne Enterprises space shuttle up to acquire the passing meteor, Batman follows him and manages to keep him from acquiring the power source inside. In the ensuing struggle, Savage sends himself and Batman hurtling back into Earth's atmosphere, Bruce dying in the descent while Savage regenerates in the desert after a few days. Bruce's new wife, Julie, is left widowed and pregnant with his child.

=== Dark Future ===
In the year 2500, man now lives side-by-side with intelligent apes, and a vast floating city - New Gotham - floats over the ruins of the original. Wayne Enterprises Vice-President Brenna Wayne, having discovered evidence of an elaborate conspiracy against her family on a disk recorded by Alfred in the last few pages of the last story - thirteen generations of Waynes have all died young in a violent manner after spending their last few days dressed in a bat-like costume - takes up the mantle of Batwoman and faces off against Vandal Savage in one final battle. Discovering that her brother James has betrayed her, Brenna and Savage face off on the meteor as Savage tries to draw it down to Earth, unconcerned about the destruction that this will cause. The battle culminates in Savage being left drifting through space on the meteor, determined to learn the purpose of his life. Unlike her ancestors, Brenna survives the ordeal and returns safely to Earth.

== See also ==
- List of Elseworlds publications
- Superman & Batman: Generations, a story that follows a similar plot of superheroes having families that follow in their footsteps for many generations
