= Batman: The Doom That Came to Gotham (film) =

Animated superhero film

- Official release poster
- Directed by: Christopher Berkeley; Sam Liu
- Written by: Jase Ricci
- Based on: Batman: The Doom That Came to Gotham by: Mike Mignola; Richard Pace
- Produced by: Jim Krieg; Sam Liu; Kimberly S. Moreau; Sam Register; Michael Uslan
- Starring: David Giuntoli; Tati Gabrielle; Navid Negahban; Emily O'Brien
- Music by: Stefan L. Smith
- Production companies: Warner Bros. Animation; DC Entertainment
- Distributed by: Warner Bros. Home Entertainment
- Release date: March 28, 2023
- Running time: 86 minutes
- Country: United States
- Language: English

Batman: The Doom That Came to Gotham is a 2023 American animated superhero film based on the DC Comics character Batman, produced by Warner Bros. Animation and distributed by Warner Bros. Home Entertainment. It is the 52nd installment in the DC Universe Animated Original Movies line.

Inspired by the three-issue comic book miniseries of the same name published from November 2000 to January 2001 under DC Comics' Elseworlds imprint, the film follows an alternate Batman in the 1920s, who is fighting against supernatural forces that are taking Gotham by storm after he accidentally reawakens an entity known as the Lurker on the Threshold. The title alludes to H. P. Lovecraft's short story "The Doom That Came to Sarnath".

== Plot ==
In the 1920s, Bruce Wayne travels abroad for twenty years following the murder of his parents, Thomas Wayne and Martha Wayne, searching for answers behind the criminal mind. While investigating the disappearance of Oswald Cobblepot's expedition crew, Bruce subdues an undead crewman, Grendon, who was freeing an otherworldly creature encased in ice. Bruce, his protégés Kai Li Cain, Dick Grayson, Sanjay "Jay" Tawde, and butler Alfred Pennyworth retrieve Grendon and return to Gotham City, unaware that Grendon was infected with one of the entity's parasites, with Jay staying on the ship to watch over him.

Arriving at Wayne Manor, Bruce and his group are shocked to find the corpse of scientist Kirk Langstrom in the library, as Bruce hallucinates a demon speaking through it with Langstrom's voice. After he disposes of Langstrom's corpse, Bruce is visited by Jason Blood, the host of the demon Etrigan, who informs Bruce of a ritual which must be performed with his death, and the destruction of Gotham.

Bruce, Kai Li, and Dick are later invited for dinner at hunter Oliver Queen's mansion. They also meet Harvey Dent, who tells them about Langstrom's obsession with the bats he had been studying. Donning a bat-themed suit of his making, Bruce (under the alias of Batman) investigates Langstrom's work at Robin's Row, which is related to the Cult of Ghul, a group who worship an ancient demonic deity, with the Testament of Ghul being the tool required for the ritual. Seeking the Testament, he stumbles upon cult member Talia, who steals it to resurrect her father, Ra's al Ghul.

Meanwhile, Grendon manifests ice abilities and escapes, killing Jay, while Dick is killed by Killer Croc. While searching for Talia, Bruce discovers a book detailing a connection between Ra's and Iog-Sotha, an inter-dimensional demon with power over darkness.

Grendon then meets with Talia. It is revealed that the key to Iog-Sotha is the seed with which Grendon was infected. The seed emerges from his body, killing him in the process, and takes the form of a plant-like demoness, who scratches Dent and mutates half of his body into a portal. The demoness and Oliver fight and kill each other, with the latter entrusting holy weapons to Bruce and Kai Li before succumbing.

Bruce is met by detective Jim Gordon, who tells him that his daughter, Barbara, wants to meet with him. Batman goes to Arkham Asylum to see her and meets Thomas Wayne's spirit, who reveals his past. In the 1600s, he, Cobblepot, Langstrom, and Henry Queen established Gotham City, discovered the Testament in a cave, and used its magic to gain longevity and wealth, as well as to bring prosperity to the previously barren land. However, this also awoke Iog-Sotha and brought him to the threshold of their reality. Afterwards, Bruce, through an arcane ritual, communes with the same bat colony that frightened him as a child, who instruct him to travel to the cave where the Testament was discovered.

Bruce takes Oliver's weapons and the bottle housing Etrigan, bids farewell to Alfred, and leaves Kai Li in charge of the Batcave, before leaving to fight Talia. He kills her, but is unable to stop Ra's, who is transformed into a powerful demonic creature. Bruce accepts his prophesied role as the Bat, transforms into a bat-like monster and kills Ra's, but Iog-Sotha has begun to enter.

Seeing the bottle housing Etrigan, Bruce releases him and escapes the caverns as they explode, killing Dent, and Etrigan traps Iog-Sotha within them. Meanwhile, parts of Gotham burn and are destroyed, echoing Jason Blood's prophecy to Bruce.

Sometime later, Gotham slowly rebuilds and Bruce, Oliver, and Harvey are given memorials to honor their dedication and sacrifice to the city. Kai Li inherits Bruce Wayne's estate and fortune and promises to use the resources to help the city rebuild. As Kai Li delivers a speech in Bruce's memory to the public, Bruce — now permanently in his monstrous bat form — rests within Gotham's bell tower with the colony as he watches over the city.

== Voice cast ==
- David Giuntoli as Bruce Wayne / Batman
- Tati Gabrielle as Kai Li Cain
- Christopher Gorham as Oliver Queen
- John DiMaggio as James Gordon
- Patrick Fabian as Harvey Dent / Two-Face
- Brian George as Alfred Pennyworth
- Jason Marsden as Dick Grayson and young Bruce Wayne
- Karan Brar as Sanjay "Jay" Tawde
- David Dastmalchian as Grendon
- Navid Negahban as Ra's al Ghul
- Emily O'Brien as Talia al Ghul and Martha Wayne
- Tim Russ as Lucius Fox
- Matthew Waterson as Jason Blood / Etrigan
- Jeffrey Combs as Kirk Langstrom
- William Salyers as Oswald Cobblepot and Professor Manfurd
- Gideon Adlon as Barbara Gordon / Oracle and Pamela Isley / Poison Ivy
- Darin De Paul as Thomas Wayne

== Production ==
The film was announced at San Diego Comic-Con in July 2022. The voice cast was then revealed in December of that same year. A few actors reprise their roles from other DC media such as David Giuntoli, who reprises his role as Batman from Batman: Soul of the Dragon (2021), Brian George as Alfred Pennyworth from Batman: The Killing Joke and Batman vs. Teenage Mutant Ninja Turtles, both Navid Negahban and Emily O'Brien reprising their roles as Ra's al Ghul and Talia from the then recently released Gotham Knights video game, and William Salyers reprising his role of The Penguin from both Batman: Return of the Caped Crusaders and Batman vs. Two-Face.

On February 2, 2023, James Gunn confirmed that all DC animated films are being released and labeled as DC Elseworlds.

== Release ==
The film was released on home media on Blu-ray, 4K, and video on demand by Warner Bros. Discovery Home Entertainment on March 28, 2023.

== Reception ==
On the review aggregator website Rotten Tomatoes, 77% of 13 critics' reviews are positive, with an average rating of 6.5/10. Writing for Flickering Myth, Hasitha Fernando praised the film as an effective adaption; highlighting the voice acting, horror elements, and the animation, saying the latter was reminiscent of Batman: The Animated Series "with a modern edge." Reviewer Jackson Luken similarly praised the film as an effective adaptation of its unique Lovecraftian elements, but found that the plot was distracted by "cameos" of other DC characters. Brian Costello of Common Sense Media described the film as "another superhero animated movie that's best enjoyed by the fans, who will probably have a lot to argue about with this one."
