= Brigham (film) =

1977 film

- Directed by: Tom McGowan
- Written by: Philip Yordan
- Produced by: Samuel Bronston
- Music by: Lex de Azevedo
- Release date: 1977
- Running time: 132 minutes
- Country: United States

Brigham is a 1977 American film which is a biopic of American religious figure Brigham Young, directed by Tom McGowan and written by Philip Yordan.

The film starred Maurice Grandmaison as Brigham Young, and Richard Moll as Joseph Smith. In a 1988 interview, Yordan recalled he had written the film for the Church of Jesus Christ of Latter-day Saints. In fact, the film was not commissioned or funded by the Church, but produced independently by Church member David Yeaman and released by Sunset Films.

The movie was released in 1977 and was for the most part poorly received. It was re-released as The New Brigham, and again in 1983 as Savage Journey.
