= The Untold Legend of the Batman =

Three-issue Batman comic book miniseries

- Cover of the paperback edition, art by José García-López and Dick Giordano.

Publication information
- Publisher: DC Comics
- Schedule: Monthly
- Format: Limited series
- Publication date: July – September 1980
- No. of issues: 3
- Main character(s): Batman; Robin

Creative team
- Written by: Len Wein
- Penciller(s): John Byrne; Jim Aparo
- Inker: Jim Aparo
- Colorist: Tatjana Wood

Collected editions
- The Untold Legend of the Batman: ISBN 9780812520422

The Untold Legend of the Batman is a three-issue Batman American comic book miniseries published by DC Comics in 1980. It was written by Len Wein. The first issue was penciled by John Byrne and inked by Jim Aparo. The second and third issues were drawn entirely by Aparo. José Luis García-López drew the covers for the entire series. The primary plot elements of the story are retellings of the origins of several Batman characters. It is the second miniseries published by DC Comics as well as the first starring Batman.

In 1989, as a marketing tool, each issue of the series was available in a special "MPI Audio Edition", accompanied by an audio cassette containing a performance of the text of the issue, with musical cues. That same year, the series was reprinted in smaller format as a premium for Batman breakfast cereal. The first issue was later adapted for animation in the Batman: The Brave and the Bold episode "Chill of the Night!"

== Plot ==
=== Issue #1: In the Beginning ===
Batman opens a package to find the shredded remains of a bat costume once worn by his father. He investigates to find the costume missing from its display case in the Batcave, with a threatening note left in its place: THIS IS ONLY THE BEGINNING, BATMAN! BEFORE I'M DONE, I WILL DESTROY YOU!

Batman reminisces about the time when his father, Dr. Thomas Wayne, wore the costume to a charity costume party and was taken hostage by a group of thugs looking for a doctor. He was taken to see their boss, bank robber Lew Moxon, who had been shot and needed the doctor to remove the bullet. Instead, Dr. Wayne attacked the thugs and defeated them. He turned them over to the police, including then-Lieutenant James W. Gordon. Wayne testified against Moxon, who was convicted. Years later, he was released and threatened to have his revenge against Wayne. Several weeks later, Dr. Wayne and his wife Martha were shot dead in front of their son Bruce (Batman) by an apparent mugger named Joe Chill. Batman recalls those who looked after him following his parents' deaths – Leslie Thompkins and Mrs. Chilton, housekeeper of Bruce's uncle, Philip Wayne (who had been appointed Bruce's guardian, but was seldom at home as his work required him to travel a lot). Unbeknownst to him, but known to his butler, Alfred Pennyworth, Mrs. Chilton was Joe Chill's mother.

Young Bruce dedicated his life to bringing his parents' killer to justice and waging war against all criminals. He studied and trained hard, and followed the career of a police detective named Harvey Harris. Bruce created a costume (that of the original Robin) to hide his identity and set out to meet Harris. Bruce happened upon a criminal waiting to attack Harris, and managed to thwart the would-be attacker. To repay him, Harris taught Bruce everything about the art of detecting, and gave him the name "Robin".

Bruce continued training and went on to college to study criminology. A lesson learned in a law class – that the law and justice are not one and the same – dissuaded Bruce from becoming a police officer as he had intended, feeling that he would be too hampered by the law. While trying to decide what kind of symbol to become in order to strike terror into the hearts of criminals, a bat flew through his window of his study, inspiring him to become Batman.

After years of crimefighting and failure to locate his parents' killer, Batman happened upon a smuggling enterprise run through a trucking company owned by Joe Chill. He confronted Chill with his story, and revealed his secret identity to him. Batman let Chill run scared; he ran for help to his henchmen at his garage and told them what had happened. After they learned he was responsible for creating Batman who had plagued them for years, the henchmen shot and killed Chill before he could reveal Batman's secret identity.

Several months later, Bruce happened upon his father's costume and journal. He learned from the journal that Chill had not been a mugger, but was working for Lew Moxon. Moxon had been in a car accident and suffered from amnesia. He did not remember Thomas Wayne or what he had done. With his own costume torn during a fight with Moxon's henchmen, Batman decided to wear his father's costume instead when he confronted Moxon. The costume jogged Moxon's memory, and he ran in fear from Batman right into the path of an oncoming truck, which killed him.

The issue ends with a 3-page feature called "The Secrets Of The Batman", by Joe Staton.

=== Issue #2: "With Friends Like These..." ===
Batman goes to a bar to find someone who can give him information about the package. After he is attacked he almost beats his informant to death, until Robin arrives to bring him back to his senses.

In trying to understand Batman's anger, Robin recalls his own origin. He recalls the night in Newtown where his parents, the Flying Graysons, performed their trapeze act for the final time, as the ropes snapped, sending them plummeting to the ground. Later that night, Dick Grayson (Robin) learned that the trapeze had been rigged by mobsters looking to extort protection money from the owner of the circus. Dick was prepared to go to the police when Batman approached him and told him of "Boss" Zucco, a mobster who controlled the whole town. Bruce Wayne took legal guardianship of Dick, and taught him the arts of crimefighting. He gave Grayson his old Robin costume, and the name to go with it.

They set out on Zucco's trail, and found him throwing one of his henchmen off of a scaffolding. Robin took a photo that led to Zucco's arrest and apparent execution. After that, he became Batman's partner. He found it hard to deal with the taunts of his classmates, but eventually graduated and left Wayne Manor to attend Hudson University. That was when Bruce and Alfred moved to the penthouse atop the Wayne Foundation Building in Gotham City, and built a new Batcave in an abandoned subway tunnel beneath the building to go with it. Robin has returned to Gotham City now at the call of Alfred, who is worried about Batman.

Alfred struggles to understand Batman's painful memories by recalling his own past. He remembers in the closing days of World War II when he helped refugees escape the Nazis, and regrets needing to kill enemy soldiers. After the war, he turned to the London theater as an actor, but as his father lay dying, he swore that he would carry on the family tradition of being a butler. Alfred got on a boat to America and sought out Bruce Wayne, whose father, Thomas Wayne, had employed his own father.

Alfred tended to Bruce and Dick, unaware of their alter egos, until one night when they returned from crimefighting, and Bruce had been injured. Dick needed Alfred's help to attend to him. From that point on, Alfred was entrusted with the duo's secrets.

Meanwhile, sorting through headshots of his rogues gallery, Batman points out that many of his enemies hate him enough to do this to him. He recalls the Joker's origin as an example. In their first meeting, at the Monarch Playing Card Company, the Joker was a masked criminal known as the Red Hood. To escape Batman, he dove into a basin of chemical waste and swam through a drainage pipe out to the river. The special oxygen system in his helmet helped him survive, but the chemicals disfigured him and transformed him into the Joker.

Another villain, Two-Face, was once Harvey Dent, Gotham's youngest District Attorney. During the trial of "Boss" Maroni, who was being charged with the murder of "Bookie" Benson, Batman was testifying. While Dent presented Maroni's lucky piece, a two-headed silver dollar, as evidence, Maroni threw a container of acid at him. Batman dove to block the container, but only deflected it enough for it to hit the left side of Dent's face, disfiguring him and turning him into Two-Face.

Robin suggests that they go see Commissioner Gordon for help, but as he starts the Batmobile, an alarm sounds, indicating that the ignition has been tampered with. Everyone dives safely for cover as a bomb goes off, destroying the car. Another threatening note is discovered in the wreckage: ONE BY ONE, I WILL DESTROY THE THINGS THAT MAKE YOU WHAT YOU ARE—AND THEN I WILL DESTROY YOU!

=== Issue #3: The Man Behind the Mask! ===
Batman goes off on his own to take vengeance on the person behind what is going on. Meanwhile, Robin calls Jack Edison, a stunt driver who has built the latest Batmobile for the Dynamic Duo, and commissions him to build another one at his usual fee with a bonus for the inconvenience. He gladly does so because Batman once saved his life by pulling him from a flaming car wreck.

Batman searches the city, asking every informant he has about the case, but with no luck. He finally goes to see Commissioner Gordon at Gotham City Police H.Q. The Commissioner suggests that Batman does not want to find any clues because the suspect is someone close to him. Batman suddenly leaves Gordon to reminisce about the first time he met Batman; how Batman initially only left scrawled notes on the criminals he tied up and left for the police, until one day he caught a man about to attack Gordon with a knife. Batman quickly left, but later that night, he came to Gordon's office. Gordon pulled a gun and prepared to shoot him, but Batman explained that they were two of a kind, and that he was able to bend the law that Gordon could not in order to achieve justice. Gordon grudgingly accepted Batman.

Gordon recalled how Batman had influenced his daughter, Barbara. She fell madly in love with him at first sight and she began studying martial arts alongside her library science Ph.D. She wore a Batgirl costume one night to a policeman's masquerade ball, but on the way to the ball, she noticed Bruce Wayne being kidnapped by a gang of Killer Moth's henchmen. She promptly attacked the men and freed Bruce, helping to bring Killer Moth to justice and starting her career as Batgirl.

The next morning, Bruce cancels all his appointments. His friend and associate, Lucius Fox, tries to talk to Bruce, but Bruce does not want to talk. Lucius reminds him of their first meeting, back when he was in the Wayne Foundation's finance division, and brought a portfolio suggestion to Bruce, who liked the idea and started Lucius on the path that made his entire career.

Bruce continues to try to figure out who is behind the attacks, until he comes to a realization. He hurries back to Wayne Manor as Batman. He sees visions of himself and his parents when he was a child. He enters the Batcave at Wayne Manor and realizes that the person behind everything is himself: a vision of Bruce Wayne reveals to Batman that he has attempted to destroy Batman because of how it has ruined his life as Wayne. As the walls of the Batcave begin to close in on him, he sees his father in the original bat costume. He explains that a warehouse explosion Batman had recently been caught in has temporarily affected his mind. His father begs Batman to leave the Batcave while he holds the walls apart, but Batman will not let him die again. Batman dives, carrying both himself and his father out of harm's way.

Once they are safe, Bruce's father removes his mask to reveal that he is not, in fact, Thomas Wayne returned from the dead, but Robin, in disguise. Batman reveals that he knew all along, but that the important part is that he has come to his senses. Batman says that he needs to be alone, and heads for a rooftop to look over Gotham City.

== Features of the "Audio Edition" comic books ==
This section describes the Audio Edition books, and does not represent the original issues

In June 1989, the series was reprinted and packaged with an audio cassette tape that included the story. The issues were smaller than standard DC comic books, at nine inches tall and six inches wide. Inside the front and back covers of each issue were black-and-white reprints of classic Batman covers, with a caption of "Great Moments in Batman's History". The covers included Batman #104, 107, 109, 110, 113 and 120. The second and third issues had more of these on the last few pages of the issues, including Batman #9, 11, 20 and Detective Comics #27 and 38.

All issues featured the original theme song "Batman, True Avenger" composed by Scott Thomas Canfield.

Batman/Bruce Wayne was portrayed by Paul Ehlers, who starred as Madman Marz in the 1981 slasher film, Madman.

The first issue contained a section after the main story called "Secrets of the Batman", with a visual tour of the Batcave, Batman's utility belt, and Batman's flying equipment.

== Collected editions ==
The series was also reprinted as a single 160-page mass market paperback (Tor Books, ISBN 9780812520422). It remains unpublished as a trade paperback.

Title	Format	Material collected	Pages	Publication date	ISBN
The Untold Legend of the Batman	Mass market paperback	The Untold Legend of the Batman #1-3	160	June 1, 2004	0812520424; 9780812520422
Tales of the Batman: Len Wein	Hardcover	Detective Comics #408, 444-448, 466, 478-479, 500, 514; Batman #307-310, 312-319, 321-324, 326-327; World's Finest Comics #207, The Untold Legend of the Batman #1-3, DC Retroactive: Batman - The '70s, Batman Black and White vol. 4 #5	640	December 30, 2014	978-1401251543
