= Joe Chill =

- Joe Chill, as appeared in Batman: Three Jokers #2 (September 2020). Art by Jason Fabok (pencils and inks) and Brad Anderson (colors)

Publication information
- Publisher: DC Comics
- First appearance: Detective Comics #33 (November 1939); Named; Batman #47 (June–July 1948)
- Created by: Bill Finger; Bob Kane

In-story information
- Full name: Joseph Chilton

Joe Chill is a fictional character appearing in American comic books published by DC Comics, commonly in association with the superhero Batman. Created by Bill Finger and Bob Kane, the character first appeared in Detective Comics #33 (November 1939). In most adaptations of Batman's origin story, Joe Chill is the mugger who murders young Bruce Wayne's parents, Dr. Thomas Wayne and Martha Wayne. The murder traumatizes Bruce, inspiring his vow to avenge their deaths by fighting crime in Gotham City as the vigilante Batman.

As an integral part of Batman's origin story, Joe Chill has appeared in numerous media adaptations. Richard Brake portrayed the character in Batman Begins, and Doug Bradley played him in Gotham Knights.

== Publication history ==
Joe Chill first appears in Detective Comics #33 and was created by Bill Finger and Bob Kane.

== Fictional character biography ==
Chill is, in most versions of Batman, a petty mugger who kills Bruce's parents Thomas and Martha while trying to take their money and jewelry. When he demands Martha's necklace, Thomas moves to protect his wife and Chill panics and shoots him. He then kills Martha when she screams for help (in later versions up to the 1970s, Martha dies from a heart attack brought on from the shock of seeing her husband murdered). Chill runs away when Bruce begins crying and calling for help – but not before the boy memorizes his features. In at least three versions of the Batman mythos, the Waynes' killer is never identified.

=== Pre-Crisis version ===
Unnamed mugger holding the Wayne family at gunpoint in Detective Comics #33 (November 1939); art by Bob Kane

Batman's origin story is first established in a sequence of panels in Detective Comics #33 (November 1939) that is later reproduced in the comic book Batman #1 (Spring 1940), but the mugger is not given a name until Batman #47 (June–July 1948). In that issue, Batman discovers that Joe Chill, the small-time crime boss he is investigating, is none other than the man who killed his parents. Batman confronts him with the knowledge that Chill killed Thomas and Martha Wayne. Chill accuses him of bluffing, but Batman takes off his cowl and reveals his secret identity: "I know because I am the son of the man you murdered! I am Bruce Wayne!"

Terrified, Chill flees and seeks protection from his henchmen. Once his henchmen learn that Chill's actions led to the hated Batman's existence, however, they turn on their boss and gun him down before suddenly realizing how priceless his knowledge of Batman's true identity is. Before the dying Chill has a chance to reveal Batman's identity, the Dark Knight intervenes and knocks out the goons. Chill dies in Batman's arms, acknowledging that the Dark Knight got his revenge after all. Len Wein and John Byrne add a one-panel coda in their retelling of this scene in the first issue of The Untold Legend of the Batman. Batman stands over Chill's body and says "No, Chill – The Batman didn't finish you... It was Bruce Wayne!"

In Detective Comics #235 (1956), Batman learns that Chill was not a mere mugger, but actually a hitman who murdered the Waynes on orders from mob boss Lew Moxon as revenge for Thomas foiling one of his robberies. Batman deduces that Chill spared his life so he would unwittingly support Moxon's alibi that he had nothing to do with a robbery that was really a planned murder.

In The Brave and the Bold #79 (September 1968), Joe Chill is revealed to have a brother named Max who is also a criminal. Max Chill is suspected of having murdered Boston Brand / Deadman, though the suspicion proves erroneous as Brand was actually killed by Hook. Max is killed when a stack of slot machines falls onto him while he is attacking Batman.

In Batman #208 (January/February 1969), it is revealed that both Joe and Max had changed their name to Chill from Chilton and that their mother was the housekeeper to Bruce Wayne's uncle Philip, who became Bruce's primary guardian after his parents' deaths. As Philip was often away on business, Mrs. Chilton played the primary parental role in Bruce's life. As an adult, Bruce continues to visit her and still calls her "Mom Chilton", unaware of her connection with Joe and Max Chill. For her part, Mrs. Chilton knows Bruce is Batman and is proud of him. She is also aware of what her sons did, but she still mourns their deaths. Alfred Pennyworth, the Wayne family butler, is also secretly aware of Mrs. Chilton's connection to Joe and Max Chill, but he keeps that information from Bruce. He muses that "in her own way, that dear woman more than made up for her son's heinous crime".

=== Post-Crisis version ===
In the 1987 storyline Batman: Year Two, Chill played a key role. Several Gotham City crime bosses hire Chill, an experienced button man, to kill the Reaper, a vigilante serial killer who is murdering their associates. When Batman proposes an alliance with the bosses, they agree that he and Chill will work together – something Batman finds repugnant, but which he nevertheless justifies to himself as necessary to stop the Reaper. He vows to kill Chill afterwards. The crime bosses also secretly commission Chill to kill Batman after he and the Caped Crusader have disposed of the Reaper.

During a major confrontation, the crime bosses are all killed in a shootout at a warehouse, in which the Reaper seemingly also perishes. Chill reasons that he has no reason to fulfill his contract, but Batman takes him to "Crime Alley", the scene of his parents' murder. There he confronts Chill and reveals his identity. Batman has Chill at gunpoint, but the Reaper then appears and guns Chill down. It is left ambiguous as to whether or not Batman would have actually pulled the trigger.

In the 1991 sequel to "Year Two", Batman: Full Circle, Chill's son Joe Chill, Jr. assumes the identity of the Reaper to seek revenge for his father's death. He attempts to drive Batman insane by using hallucinogenic drugs in conjunction with a faked video of the Waynes' murder to trigger Batman's survivor's guilt over his parents' death and thus break his spirit. After the intervention of Robin, Batman frees himself from the drug-induced haze. After the new Reaper is defeated, Batman learns to let go of his hatred of Chill.

In Detective Comics #678, a "Zero Hour" crossover story, Batman finds himself in an alternate timeline where he was killed by a mugger instead of his parents. Investigating the crime, he discovers that Chill, at least in this timeline, did not commit the murder. Once he returns to his own timeline, Bruce Wayne is plagued with doubt; he wonders if there is a possibility that he never actually caught his parents' killer, and if that makes any difference regarding his crimefighting career. Ultimately, he concludes that it does not.

In 2006, Infinite Crisis #6 re-established that Chill was responsible for killing Thomas and Martha Wayne, and that he was later arrested on that same night for their murder.

In the 2008 Grant Morrison story "Joe Chill in Hell" (featured in Batman #673), Chill is reinterpreted as a mid-level crime boss who builds a company called Land, Sea, and Air Transport, which he uses as a front for his other, illegal businesses. He blames his crimes, including murdering the Waynes, on class warfare, claiming that the unequal distribution of wealth in Gotham forced him to commit crimes in order to survive. In this story, Batman has visited and frightened Chill every night for a month. Chill is living as a shut-in, but his guards never see or catch Batman during the visits. On his final visit, Batman gives Chill the gun he used to kill the Waynes, with a single bullet loaded in it. Chill finally realizes who Batman is and fears what his fellow gangsters might do if they found out he was responsible for creating him. It is implied that he uses his gun to commit suicide. Considering the issue consists of Bruce's flashbacks and hallucinations from an experiment he undergoes during his early career, however, it is left ambiguous whether the events of the story are real.

In 2009's Whatever Happened to the Caped Crusader? by Neil Gaiman, Joe Chill is seen as the bartender attending Batman's funeral (the funeral itself being a near death experience). Batman, who is observing the event accompanied by Catwoman, notes that Chill should be dead. Chill notes that he was there at the birth of Batman, so it is only fitting he should be there to witness the end.

=== The New 52 ===
In 2011, DC Comics relaunched its entire line of monthly books, and rebooted the fictional continuity of its books in an initiative called "The New 52". An 18-year-old Bruce Wayne tracks Chill down and holds him at gunpoint, demanding to know who hired him to kill his parents. Chill, an alcoholic ne'er-do-well, responds that he just wanted Martha Wayne's pearls so he could buy alcohol and that he didn't even know who the Waynes were until the next day. Enraged that Chill killed his parents for no reason, Bruce prepares to kill him, but relents at the last minute when he realizes that his father would not have wanted that. After sparing Chill's life, Bruce Wayne leaves Gotham City and begins training to fight crime, vowing that he will stop criminals like Chill from harming anyone else.

=== Post-DC Rebirth ===
In 2016, DC Comics implemented another relaunch of its books called "DC Rebirth", which restored its continuity to a form much as it was prior to "The New 52". In the 2020 miniseries Batman: Three Jokers, a news report about the massacre of the final members of the Moxon Crime Family stated that they were accused of hiring Chill to kill Thomas and Martha Wayne, only for them to be exonerated when Chill confessed that he acted alone. It was also mentioned that Chill is serving a life sentence at Blackgate Penitentiary.

Using the fingerprints from Judge Wade Walls' humanitarian trophy, Batman enters Blackgate Penitentiary to see Chill. After Batman finds that Chill is not in his cell, Batgirl informs him that Chill was moved to the infirmary ward because he has advanced cancer. Two versions of the Joker, Comedian Joker and Criminal Joker, later abduct Chill from the infirmary, where they torture him to get him to explain on camera why he murdered the Waynes.

Batman, Batgirl, and Red Hood arrive at the theater where the two Jokers are holding Chill prisoner as a film plays of Chill confessing that he killed the Waynes because he thought they were rich elitists who did not care about anyone but themselves, only to realize that he was wrong after he saw the young Bruce sobbing over their dead bodies. The Criminal Joker plans to dump Chill in a mixture of the rejuvenating chemicals from Ra's al Ghul's Lazarus Pit and his own Joker Venom in hopes of turning him into the "Ultimate Joker", but Batman saves Chill's life and forgives him for murdering his parents, in the process revealing his secret identity to him. After the death of the Criminal Joker and the surrender of the Comedian Joker, Bruce Wayne visits Chill on his death bed and shakes his hand. Chill dies peacefully, and Bruce finally finds closure over his parents' deaths.

== Other versions ==
- On Earth-Three, Joe Chill was a friend of Thomas Wayne. One night, a police officer wants to bring the elder Wayne in for questioning. When he refuses, the police officer suddenly opens fire, killing this Earth's version of Bruce and Martha Wayne. Chill comes out of an alleyway to discover the dead bodies and the Waynes' younger son Thomas Wayne Jr., leaves with him, blaming his father for his mother and brother's deaths, and seeing Chill as the only father figure he has left.
- In the alternate universe of the 2011 storyline "Flashpoint", Joe Chill shoots and kills the young Bruce Wayne, and Thomas Wayne kills him to avenge his son.
- In Andrew Vachss' novel Batman: The Ultimate Evil, Joe Chill killed Bruce Wayne's parents on the orders of an international ring of pedophiles. They wanted to silence Bruce's mother Martha, who was investigating their network of sexual slavery and child pornography.
- On the alternate world of Earth 2, Joe Chill succeeded in killing Martha Wayne, but Thomas survives and kills Chill in retaliation.

== In other media ==
=== Television ===
- Joe Chill appears in a flashback in The Super Powers Team: Galactic Guardians episode "The Fear", voiced by Michael Rye.
- Joe Chill appears in a fantasy sequence in the Justice League Unlimited episode "For the Man Who Has Everything", voiced by an uncredited Kevin Conroy. After falling victim to a hallucinogenic plant called the Black Mercy, Batman becomes trapped in a fantasy where Thomas Wayne beats and disarms Chill before he can murder him and Martha until Wonder Woman frees him.
- Joe Chill appears in the Batman: The Brave and the Bold episode "Chill of the Night!", voiced by Peter Onorati. This version is a hitman who killed Thomas and Martha Wayne on his boss Lew Moxon's behalf in retaliation for Thomas putting Moxon in jail. In the present, Chill has become an arms dealer selling weapons to supervillains. As part of a bet between the Phantom Stranger and the Spectre over whether Batman would, given the right circumstances, break his vow of never killing anyone, Batman locates and beats Chill before revealing his secret identity to him, but ultimately spares his life. Chill begs his latest clients for protection, but they turn on him upon learning he is indirectly responsible for Batman's existence. Batman saves Chill from them, but it is implied that the Spectre manipulated the events of the fight so that Chill is crushed to death by falling rubble.
- Joe Chill makes a non-speaking cameo appearance in the Beware the Batman episode "Monsters".
- A mental projection of Joe Chill embodying Bruce Wayne's guilt over his parents' deaths appears in the Harley Quinn episode "Batman Begins Forever", voiced by Diedrich Bader.
- Joe Chill appears in the Gotham Knights episode "A Chill in Gotham", portrayed by Doug Bradley. Sometime prior to the series and after murdering Thomas and Martha Wayne, he ended up on death row. On the day of his execution by the electric chair, he requests to speak with Bruce Wayne's adoptive son, Turner Hayes. Upon meeting him, Chill reveals the Court of Owls framed both of them for crimes they did not commit before he is executed.
- Joe Chill makes a non-speaking cameo appearance in the Batman: Caped Crusader episode "Kiss of the Catwoman".

=== Film ===
- In the original script written by Tom Mankiewicz in 1983 for the film that eventually became Batman (1989), crime boss Rupert Thorne hires Joe Chill to murder Thomas Wayne, who is running against Thorne for city council. In Sam Hamm's original drafts, Chill is referred to as "Gunman". In the final version of the film, however, gangster Jack Napier takes Chill's role as Thomas and Martha Wayne's killer while Chill, according to producer Michael Uslan, became one of Napier's men who accompanied him in mugging the Waynes, was credited as "Other Mugger", and portrayed by Clyde Gatell. This change, due to Hamm participating in a screenwriters' strike was reinserted into the script by director Tim Burton and screenwriter Warren Skaaren. After Napier fatally shoots Thomas and Martha, he almost shoots their son Bruce, but Chill advises him to flee before the police arrive.
- Joe Chill appears in Batman Begins, portrayed by Richard Brake. This version claims to have resorted to mugging the Waynes because he was one of millions of Gothamites struggling with poverty amidst an economic depression. After serving 14 years in prison, Chill makes a deal to receive parole in return for testifying against a previous cellmate and mob boss Carmine Falcone. As Chill is escorted out of the courthouse, he is shot and killed by one of Falcone's assassins.
- Joe Chill makes a cameo appearance in Batman v Superman: Dawn of Justice, portrayed by an uncredited Damon Caro.
- Joe Chill appears in a flashback in Justice League Dark: Apokolips War.

=== Video games ===
- Joe Chill, credited as "Wayne family killer", is alluded to in a nightmare sequence in Batman: Arkham Asylum, voiced by Duane Shepherd.
- Joe Chill appears in Batman: The Telltale Series, voiced by Jarion Monroe. This version worked as a hitman for Carmine Falcone and murdered Thomas and Martha Wayne on behalf of Gotham's corrupt mayor and an associate of Falcone's, Hamilton Hill. Chill is later imprisoned for his crime and stabbed to death by a fellow inmate hired by Hill to keep him quiet.
- Joe Chill appears in Batman: Arkham VR, voiced by Glenn Wrage.
- Joe Chill appears in Batman: Arkham Shadow, voiced by Armin Shimerman. This version is an inmate of Blackgate Prison who supplies prisoners and guards alike with contraband and attends therapy sessions with Dr. Harleen Quinzel in an attempt to make peace with his troubled past, which he deeply regrets. During his time at Blackgate, he befriends fellow inmate Irving "Matches" Malone, unaware he is a disguised Batman. Chill is later captured by Harvey Dent in an attempt to execute him and seek vengeance on Bruce Wayne's behalf, but is saved by Batman, who unmasks himself as Bruce before Chill and Dent. After apologizing to Bruce, Chill vows to keep his secret and is allowed to leave, later turning himself in.

=== Miscellaneous ===
- Joe Chill appears in The Batman Adventures #17. This version is Joseph Chiblonski, a career criminal who has lived in fear of Bruce Wayne plotting revenge against him ever since he killed Bruce's parents, to the point where he sees Bruce's face everywhere he looks. After completing a prison sentence for an unrelated crime, his paranoia worsens when he learns the police detective who originally worked on the Waynes' murder has discovered evidence that he was the killer. Chill attempts to murder the detective, only to be confronted by Batman. In the ensuing fight, Chill unmasks Batman, sees Bruce's face, and jumps off a balcony in terror. Batman tries to save Chill, whom he does not recognize, but the latter pushes him away and falls to his death.
- Joe Chill's great-grandnephew Jake Chill appears in Batman Beyond (vol. 2). Similarly to his great-granduncle, Jake indirectly contributed to Terry McGinnis becoming the new Batman after he killed the latter's father Warren McGinnis while working for Derek Powers' "Quiet Squad", a small team of Wayne-Powers security guards who served as Powers' personal assassins. Following Powers' disappearance, the Quiet Squad was fired, which left Jake destitute and stricken with guilt over Warren's murder. Forced to move into Neo-Gotham's slums, he descends into alcoholism and depression until he fends off a gang of thugs attacking his apartment. He finds a new purpose in life and becomes a superhero using his Wayne-Powers security equipment in an attempt to redeem himself. Calling himself the "Vigilante", Jake proves himself a dedicated ally to Batman until he is killed by the Jokerz. Upon learning Jake killed his father, Terry curses his late ally, but eventually comes to appreciate the latter's heroism. However, he also discovers Bruce Wayne knew Jake's secret and withheld it from him, leading to a rift developing between Terry and Wayne.
- Joe Chill appears in Smallville Season 11 as a member of Intergang unconnected to Batman, who is later killed by Mr. Freeze.
- An alternate universe variant of Joe Chill appears in the Justice League: Gods and Monsters prequel comic as Lew Moxon's right hand who becomes a vampire after being bitten by his universe's Batman, who later kills Chill.

== See also ==
- List of Batman family enemies
