= Thomas Wayne =

DC Comics character

- Thomas Wayne, as he appeared on a variant cover of Detective Comics #1050 (January 2022). Art by Jorge Molina.

Publication information
- Publisher: DC Comics
- First appearance: Detective Comics #33 (November 1939)
- Created by: Bill Finger (writer); Gardner Fox (writer); Bob Kane (artist); Jerry Robinson (artist)

In-story information
- Full name: Dr. Thomas Wayne
- Team affiliations: Wayne Enterprises
- Supporting character of: Batman; Flash
- Notable aliases: Dr. Wayne, Batman

Dr. Thomas Wayne, M.D. is a fictional character appearing in American comic books published by DC Comics. He is the father of Bruce Wayne, and husband of Martha Wayne as well as the paternal grandfather of Damian Wayne. Wayne was introduced in Detective Comics #33 (November 1939), the first exposition of Batman's origin story. A gifted surgeon and philanthropist to Gotham City, Wayne inherited the Wayne family fortune after Patrick Wayne. When Wayne and his wife are murdered in a street mugging, Bruce is inspired to fight crime in Gotham as the superhero Batman.

Wayne was revived in Geoff Johns' alternate timeline comic Flashpoint (2011), in which he plays a major role as a hardened, more violent version of Batman, whose son was killed instead of him and his wife, leading both of them to become the altered reality's counterparts of Batman and the Joker respectively, and dies again by the end of the storyline. Dr. Wayne returned to the main DC Universe in DC Rebirth, as a revived amalgamation of his original self killed by Joe Chill and his Flashpoint Batman self killed in "The Button", teaming up with the supervillain Bane to attempt to force his son to retire as Batman.

As a key figure in the origin of Batman, Thomas Wayne has appeared in multiple forms of media. Notable portrayals of the character in live-action films include Linus Roache in Batman Begins (2005), Jeffrey Dean Morgan in Batman v Superman: Dawn of Justice (2016), Brett Cullen in Joker (2019), and Luke Roberts in The Batman (2022). Ben Aldridge also portrays him in the television series Pennyworth (2019).

== Background ==
Thomas Wayne, M.D. is seldom shown outside of Bruce Wayne's and Alfred Pennyworth's memories of him, and Bruce's dreams and nightmares. He is frequently depicted as looking very much like his son, but with a mustache.

A notable occurrence in Thomas’ biography was when Bruce falls through a fissure on the Wayne property, into what would one day become the Batcave (sometimes the fissure is replaced with an abandoned well). Thomas eventually rescues his terrified son from the cave.

Bruce Wayne with a portrait of his deceased parents in Batman vol. 3, #9 (December 2016). Art by Mikel Janín.

Dr. Wayne's role in his son's future vigilante career is expanded upon in "The First Batman", a Silver Age tale from Detective Comics #235, which reveals that Dr. Wayne attacks and defeats hoodlums while dressed like a "Bat-Man" for a masquerade ball. According to the story, Dr. Wayne's actions result in crime boss Lew Moxon being imprisoned; ten years later, Moxon orders Joe Chill to murder Dr. Wayne. Realizing Moxon ordered his parents killed, Batman confronts Moxon, now suffering from amnesia and thus has no memory of Dr. Wayne. When his costume is torn, Batman wears his father's in order to frighten Moxon. Sure enough, the costume restores Moxon's memory; the former crime boss panics, believing that Thomas’ ghost is attacking, and flees into the streets and is struck and killed by a truck. These events were retold in the 1980 miniseries The Untold Legend of the Batman. Following the Crisis on Infinite Earths, Thomas as the "First Batman" was retconned – he instead attends the masquerade ball as Zorro. This was retconned once more in the pages of Superman/Batman, where Superman, hoping to reverse some universe-altering change in the time streams, lands in a version of Gotham City in which Thomas never died, finding him giving out Halloween candy in the original Batman costume.

In many modern interpretations of the character, such as those by Frank Miller and Jeph Loeb, Thomas Wayne is portrayed as having been a somewhat distant, stern father, bestowing more kindness and generosity on his patients than his own son.

In Batman: The Long Halloween, a flashback reveals that Thomas Wayne saved the life of gangster Carmine Falcone. Falcone's father Vincent Falcone came to Wayne Manor and begged Thomas to save his dying son, who had been shot by rival gangster Luigi Maroni. Thomas wanted to take the younger Falcone to the hospital, but Vincent insisted that nobody know about the shooting; the surgery was thus performed in the dining room with Alfred assisting. After saving Carmine's life, he was offered a reward or favor, but refused to accept any form of payment. Unbeknownst to Thomas, young Bruce watched this all in silence from afar. Years later, Bruce contemplates whether Gotham would have been better off had his father let Falcone die; Alfred replies that Thomas would have helped anyone in need.

In Superman/Batman #50, it is revealed that, while on a drive with a pregnant Martha Wayne, Thomas witnesses a strange object fall to Earth. As he inspects it, Thomas' consciousness is transported to Krypton, and presented in a holographic form. There, he encounters Jor-El, wishing to know what kind of a world Earth is, as it is one of many possible candidates for him to send his son Kal-El to. Thomas tells Jor-El that the people of Earth are not perfect, but are essentially a good and kind race, who would raise the child right, convincing Jor-El to send Kal-El there. Upon returning to his body, Thomas uses the technology in the Kryptonian probe to revitalize a failing Wayne Enterprises. Years later, the alien technology would be the basis of much of Batman's crimefighting technology. Thomas recorded his encounter in a diary, which was discovered by Bruce in the present day.

=== Murder ===
Bruce Wayne's family encounters Joe Chill in Detective Comics #33 (November 1939). Art by Bob Kane.

When exiting a movie theater (opera in some versions), Thomas and Martha Wayne are murdered by a mugger in front of their son, Bruce Wayne. This tragedy shocks Gotham and leads to Park Row (the street where it occurred) being labeled Crime Alley. Most importantly, it serves as the motivation for Bruce to become Batman.

=== Alleged double life ===
During Batman R.I.P., it is alleged that Thomas Wayne and Martha Wayne were leading a double life, secretly partaking in criminal endeavors, drug abuse and orgies while presenting a façade of respectability to the outside world. The alleged evidence is revealed to be doctored in the aftermath of the storyline, however.

Doctor Simon Hurt, head of the Black Glove and the mastermind in Batman R.I.P., actually claims to be Thomas Wayne to both Bruce Wayne and Alfred Pennyworth. Although both of them rebuke him without hesitation, Hurt never explicitly drops the claim.

In the ongoing follow-up series, Batman & Robin, it is suggested that some, if not all, of these allegations have begun to circulate around Gotham; Dick Grayson and Damian Wayne attend a high society function where a few party guests vaguely mention the existence of rumors surrounding the family, and Dick tries to tie Bruce's absence from the public eye with being occupied with clearing his family's reputation. Matters come to a head when Hurt returns to the city, claiming to be Thomas Wayne in order to take control of Wayne Manor and establish himself as the new Batman, but Grayson and Damian outsmart him.

It is hinted at during the course of the Batman and Robin series that Simon Hurt's actual identity is Thomas Wayne, albeit one from the 17th century who was a 'black sheep' of the Wayne family and prolongs his life through occult rituals. The Return of Bruce Wayne miniseries and its fallout Bruce Wayne: The Road Home cements Hurt's status as the elder Thomas Wayne from the Puritan Ages, driven insane by his meeting with Barbatos, the Hyper-Adapter sent through time along with Bruce Wayne to ensure the effectiveness of Darkseid's "Omega Sanction".

== Other versions ==
=== Batman: Castle of the Bat ===
An alternate universe version of Thomas Wayne appears in Batman: Castle of the Bat. This version was resurrected as a Frankenstein-like creature after Bruce Wayne discovered his disembodied, preserved brain.

=== Batman: Dark Knight Dynasty ===
An alternate universe version of Thomas Wayne appears in Batman: Dark Knight Dynasty. This version was killed by Vandal Savage.

=== Batman: Holy Terror ===
An alternate universe version of Thomas Wayne appears in Batman: Holy Terror. This version is the chief physician of the Privy Council who opposes Oliver Cromwell's worldwide theocratic government

=== Batman: Earth One ===
Thomas Wayne in Batman: Earth One. Art by Gary Frank and Jon Sibal.

An alternate universe version of Thomas Wayne appears in Batman: Earth One.

=== Flashpoint ===
Batman (left) and the Joker (right) of the Flashpoint universe. Art by Dave Johnson.

An alternate universe version of Thomas Wayne appears in the Flashpoint event. This version became Batman to avenge the death of his son Bruce Wayne, with his wife Martha becoming a version of the Joker. Following his introduction in Flashpoint, Thomas makes subsequent appearances in the events Convergence, The Button, and Flashpoint Beyond.

=== JLA: Earth 2 ===
An alternate universe version of Thomas Wayne appears in JLA: Earth 2. This version became the commissioner of the Gotham City Police Department after the deaths of Martha and Bruce.

=== Superman: Red Son ===
An alternate universe version of Thomas Wayne appears in Superman: Red Son. This version is an anti-communist activist who is later killed by the NKVD under Commissar Pyotr Roslov.

=== The New 52 ===
==== Earth 2 ====
An alternate universe version of Thomas Wayne from Earth-Two who succeeded Bruce as Batman using the Miraclo pill appears in The New 52.

During the Convergence storyline, Thomas is killed while fighting the Club of Villains. He is later succeeded by Dick Grayson.

==== Earth 3 ====
An alternate universe version of Thomas Wayne from Earth-Three appears in The New 52. This version is a sociopathic doctor who is later killed by Alfred Pennyworth.

=== DC Comics Bombshells ===
An alternate universe version of Thomas Wayne appears in DC Comics Bombshells. This version was saved by Batwoman, leading Bruce Wayne to become Batman in the latter's honor.

=== Absolute Universe ===
An alternate universe version of Thomas Wayne appears in Absolute Batman. This version is a school teacher who was killed protecting his students from a shooter.

== In other media ==
=== Television ===
==== Live-action ====
- Thomas Wayne appears in Gotham, portrayed by Grayson McCouch.
  - A young Thomas Wayne appears in Pennyworth, portrayed by Ben Aldridge. This series explores his past as a CIA agent out of Gotham City operating in England to monitor Alfred Pennyworth.
- Thomas Wayne appears in a photograph in Titans.

==== Animation ====
- Thomas Wayne appears in a flashback in The Super Powers Team: Galactic Guardians episode "The Fear", voiced by Paul Kirby.
- Thomas Wayne appears in Batman: The Animated Series, voiced by Richard Moll in "Nothing to Fear", and by an uncredited Kevin Conroy in later appearances. This version was friends with Matthew Thorne, with whom he attended medical school.
- An illusionary version of Thomas Wayne appears in the Justice League Unlimited episode "For the Man Who Has Everything", voiced again by Kevin Conroy.
- Thomas Wayne appears in flashbacks in The Batman (2004), voiced by Jeff Bennett.
- Thomas Wayne appears in Batman: The Brave and the Bold, voiced initially by Corey Burton and later by Adam West.
- Thomas Wayne appears in flashbacks in Beware the Batman, voiced by Anthony Ruivivar.

=== Film ===
==== Live-action ====
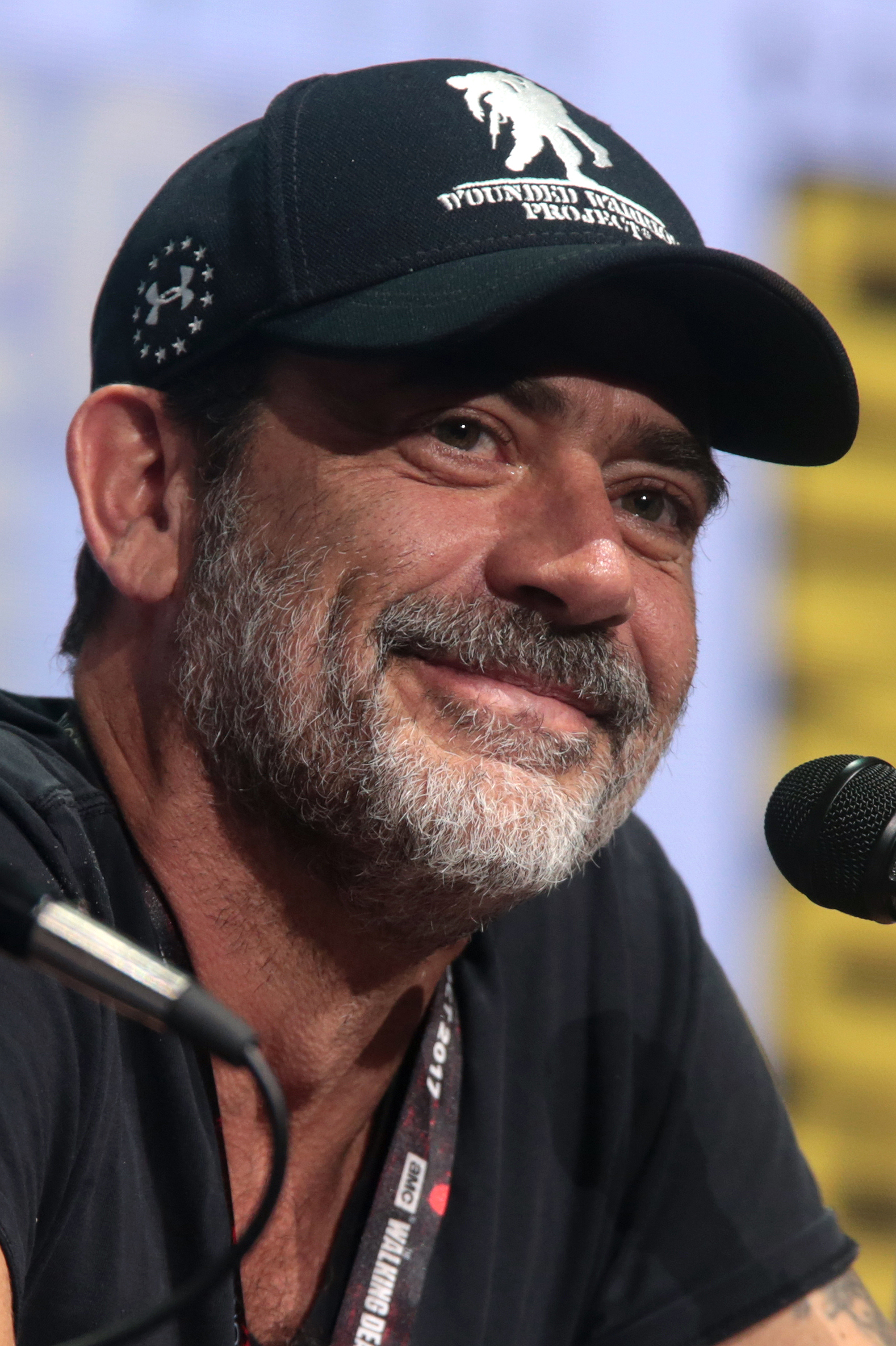
Jeffrey Dean Morgan who portrays Thomas Wayne in Batman v Superman: Dawn of Justice

- Thomas Wayne appears in Batman (1989), portrayed by David Baxt. This version was killed by Jack Napier.
- Thomas Wayne appears in Batman Forever, portrayed by Michael Scranton.
- Thomas Wayne appears in Batman Begins, portrayed by Linus Roache. This version was a surgeon at the Gotham City hospital and the chairman of Wayne Enterprises. Additionally, his and Martha's deaths encouraged Gotham City's elite to bring it back from the brink of ruin, foiling Ra's al Ghul's plan to destroy Gotham's economy.
- A vision of Thomas Wayne appears in The Dark Knight Rises.
- Thomas Wayne appears in Batman v Superman: Dawn of Justice, portrayed by Jeffrey Dean Morgan.
- Thomas Wayne, based on Jeffrey Dean Morgan's likeness, appears in a photograph in Justice League.
- Thomas Wayne appears in Joker, portrayed by Brett Cullen. This version is a businessman who is running to become mayor of Gotham City and displays little sympathy for the lower classes, dismissing them as "clowns" who have no one but themselves to blame for their misfortune.
- Thomas Wayne appears in The Batman (2022), portrayed by Luke Roberts.
- Thomas Wayne, based on David Baxt's likeness, appears in a photograph in The Flash. Additionally, his Batman depiction was planned to appear, but was scrapped and replaced by the 1989 film incarnation of Batman.

==== Animation ====
- Thomas Wayne appears in Batman: Gotham Knight, voiced by Jason Marsden.
- Thomas Wayne appears in Batman: The Dark Knight Returns, voiced by Bruce Timm.
- The Flashpoint incarnation of Batman appears in Justice League: The Flashpoint Paradox, voiced by Kevin McKidd.
- Thomas Wayne makes a non-speaking appearance in a flashback in Son of Batman.
- Thomas Wayne appears in Batman vs. Robin, voiced again by Kevin Conroy.
- Thomas Wayne makes a non-speaking appearance in Batman: Bad Blood.
- Thomas Wayne appears in a photograph in The Lego Batman Movie.
- Thomas Wayne appears in DC Super Heroes vs. Eagle Talon, voiced by Frogman.
- Thomas Wayne makes a non-speaking cameo appearance in Teen Titans Go! To the Movies.
- The Flashpoint incarnation of Batman makes a non-speaking cameo appearance in Suicide Squad: Hell to Pay.
- Thomas Wayne appears in Batman: Death in the Family, voiced by John DiMaggio.
- Thomas Wayne appears in Batman: The Long Halloween, voiced by Robin Atkin Downes.
- An alternate timeline version of Thomas Wayne appears in Batman: The Doom That Came to Gotham, voiced by Darin De Paul. This version founded Gotham City centuries prior alongside Oswald Cobblepot, Kirk Langstrom, and Robert Queen, utilizing dark magic from the Testament to increase his lifespan and the town's prosperity.
- An alternate universe variant of Thomas Wayne named Toltecatzin appears in Aztec Batman: Clash of Empires, voiced by Jorge R. Gutiérrez.

=== Video games ===
- Thomas Wayne makes a cameo appearance in Batman: Rise of Sin Tzu.
- Thomas Wayne appears in Batman: Dark Tomorrow, voiced by Richard Ferrone.
- Thomas Wayne appears in The Dark Knight Rises tie-in game, voiced by Steven French.
- The Flashpoint Batman's outfit appears as a costume for Bruce Wayne / Batman in Injustice: Gods Among Us.
- Thomas Wayne appears in Scribblenauts Unmasked: A DC Comics Adventure.
- Thomas Wayne appears in flashbacks in Batman: The Telltale Series, voiced by Troy Baker. This version was a criminal with ties to Carmine Falcone and Hamilton Hill.
- Thomas Wayne makes a cameo appearance in Lego Batman: Legacy of the Dark Knight.

==== Batman Arkham ====
Thomas Wayne appears in the Batman Arkham series, voiced again by Kevin Conroy.

- A Scarecrow-induced hallucination of Thomas makes a cameo appearance in Batman: Arkham Asylum.
- Thomas Wayne's New 52 Earth-2 Batman costume appears as an alternate outfit in Batman: Arkham Origins.
- Thomas Wayne appears in Batman: Arkham VR.
- The Flashpoint Batman suit and Thomas Wayne's New 52 Earth-2 Batman suit appear as DLC costumes in Batman: Arkham Knight.
- Thomas Wayne appears in Batman: Arkham Shadow, voiced by Andrew Morgado.
