= Richard Moll =

European-American actor (1943–2023)

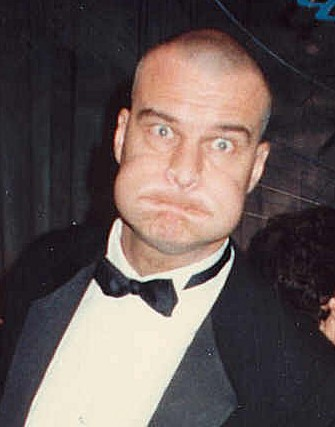
- Moll mugging for the camera, 1987
- Born: Charles Richard Moll; January 13, 1943; Pasadena, California, U.S.
- Died: October 26, 2023 (aged 80); Big Bear Lake, California, U.S.
- Other name: Charles Moll
- Education: University of California, Berkeley (BA)
- Occupation: Actor
- Years active: 1965–2018
- Height: 6 ft 9 in (206 cm)
- Spouses: Laura Class (m. 1989; div. 1992) Susan Brown (m. 1993; div. 2005)
- Children: 2

Charles Richard Moll (January 13, 1943 – October 26, 2023) was an American actor known for playing Aristotle Nostradamus "Bull" Shannon, a bailiff on the NBC sitcom Night Court from 1984 to 1992. Moll also voiced Harvey Dent/Two-Face in the DC Animated Universe series Batman: The Animated Series and The New Batman Adventures, and briefly reprised the role in the Batman: The Brave and the Bold episode "Chill of the Night!" where he also voiced the character Lew Moxon.

== Early life ==
Charles Richard Moll was born January 13, 1943, in Pasadena, California, the son of Violet Anita (née Grill), a nurse, and Harry Findley Moll, a lawyer. He was tall early in his life, reaching 6 feet 1 inch (1.85 m) by age 12, and kept growing until he was about 6 ft 9 in (2.06 m) tall. As a child, he and his family would often visit Jackson Hole, Wyoming. He attended the University of California, Berkeley, and was a member of the Kappa Alpha Order fraternity. During his time at UC Berkeley, Moll performed in works of William Shakespeare.

== Career ==
In the 1977 film Brigham, Moll (credited as Charles Moll) appeared as Joseph Smith, founder of the Latter Day Saint movement. Moll would go on to often portray hulking or imposing characters due to his height and deep voice. In 1979, Moll played the part of Eugene, a gangster on the television series Happy Days in the episode "Fonzie's Funeral". In 1981, Moll co-starred with Jan-Michael Vincent and Kim Basinger in the film Hard Country, and he also played the Abominable Snowman in the comedy feature film Caveman. The same year, he had a small part in the Mork & Mindy episode "Alienation", where he appeared with future fellow Night Court cast member John Larroquette. In 1982, he played the sorcerer Xusia in The Sword and the Sorcerer.

In 1983, Moll shaved his head for the role of Hurok in the science fiction B movie Metalstorm: The Destruction of Jared-Syn. The producers of the TV sitcom Night Court liked the look so much in his audition that they asked him to keep it. He played bailiff Aristotle Nostradamus "Bull" Shannon on Night Court from 1984 to 1992. He also used the Bull persona in commercials for the Washington Lottery.

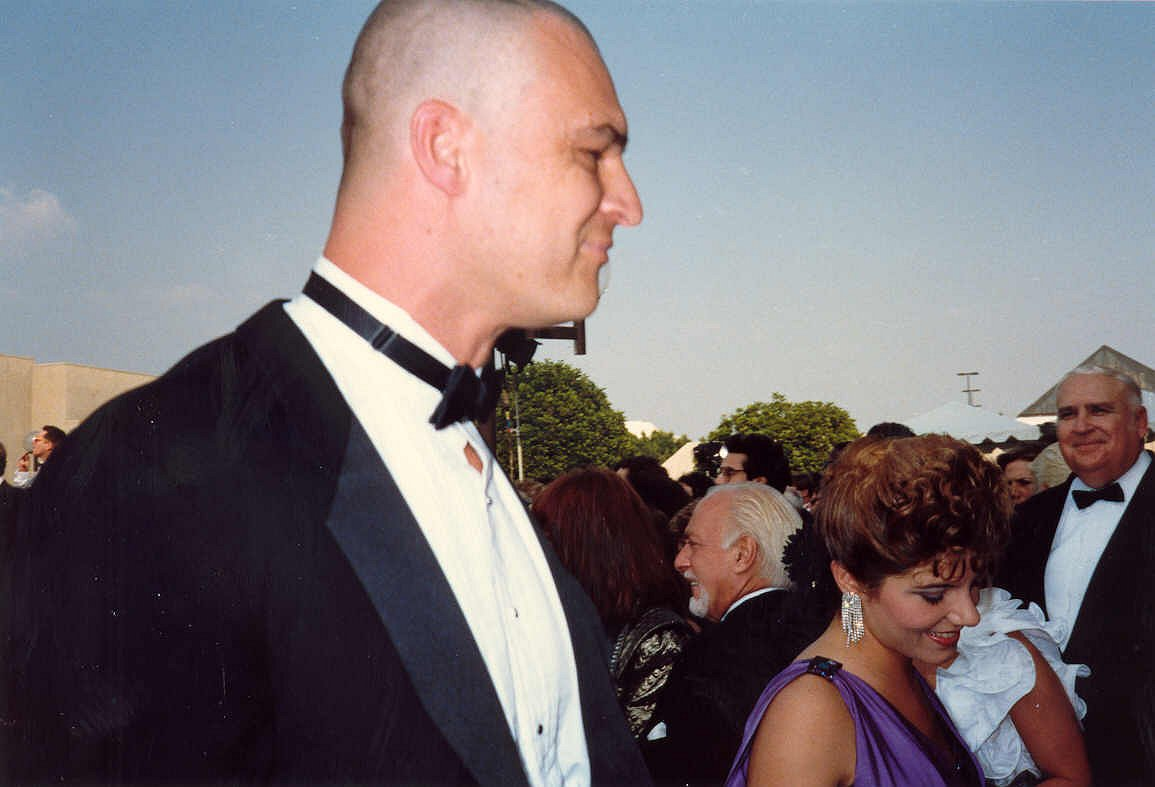
Moll at the 39th Emmy Awards in 1987

=== Voiceover work ===
Moll can be heard in many animated productions, often as a villain with a deep, growling voice. He voiced Norman in Mighty Max and Two-Face in Batman: The Animated Series.

Moll also provided voice work in the Batman: The Brave and the Bold episode "Chill of the Night!" voicing Lew Moxon as well as briefly reprising Two-Face (who was mainly voiced by James Remar). His first role in an animated film was as a beat poet in Ralph Bakshi's American Pop.

== Personal life and death ==
Moll was married twice: he was married to Laura Class from 1989 to 1992 and Susan Brown from 1993 to 2005. He had two children with Brown as well as stepchildren.

Moll was an avid bird watcher who spent his retirement in Big Bear Lake, California.

Moll died at his home in Big Bear Lake on October 26, 2023, at the age of 80.

== Filmography ==
=== Film ===
Year	Title	Role	Notes
1977	Brigham	Joseph Smith	Film debut, credited as Charles Moll
1980	Cataclysm	James Hanson	Credited as Charles Moll
1981	American Pop	Beat poet	
1981	Hard Country	Top Gun	
1981	Caveman	Abominable Snowman	
1981	Evilspeak	Father Esteban	
1982	Liar's Moon	Detective Roy Logan	
1982	The Sword and the Sorcerer	Xusia	
1983	Metalstorm: The Destruction of Jared-Syn	Hurok	
1983	Under Arrest	Patrino	
1984	The Dungeonmaster	Mestema	
1985	Night Train to Terror	Otto, James Hansen	
1985	House	Big Ben	Nominated - Saturn Award for Best Supporting Actor
1987	Survivor	Kragg	
1988	Pulse Pounders	Mestema	
1989	Wicked Stepmother	Nathan Pringle	
1989	Think Big	Thornton	
1989	Murphy's Laws of Golf	Golf Police	Short film
1991	Driving Me Crazy	Buzz	
1992	Sidekicks	Horn	
1992	Marilyn Alive and Behind Bars	Otto	
1992	Let's Kill All the Lawyers	The Centurian	
1993	Loaded Weapon 1	Prison attendant	
1994	The Flintstones	Hoagie	
1994	No Dessert, Dad, Till You Mow the Lawn	Boot Camp Sergeant	
1994	Beanstalk	Richard Leech	
1995	Galaxis	Kyla	
1996	Storybook	Woody	
1996	The Secret Agent Club	Wrecks	
1996	The Glass Cage	Ian Dexter	
1996	Jingle All the Way	Dementor	
1996	The Lawyer	Centurion	
1996	The Elevator	Man Nun	
1997	Living in Peril	Fritz	
1997	Snide and Prejudice	General von Ludendorf	
1997	Little Cobras: Operation Dalmatian	Leader	
1997	Farticus	Hades	
1997	Casper: A Spirited Beginning	Principal Rabie	Direct-to-video
1998	The Survivor	Kyla	
1998	Casper Meets Wendy	Jules	Direct-to-video
1998	Route 66	Unknown	
1998	Monkey Business	Leader	
1999	Foreign Correspondents	Man in Bookstore	
1999	But I'm a Cheerleader	Larry	
2000	Shadow Hours	Homeless man	
2000	Boltneck	Mr. O'Reilly	
2000	That Summer in LA	Hotel Manager	
2000	Flamingo Dreams	Deke	
2001	Spiders II: Breeding Ground	Dr. Grbac	
2001	Evolution	Fire Training Inspector	
2001	Scary Movie 2	Hell House Ghost	
2002	Angel Blade	Carl Shank	
2002	No Place Like Home	Deputy 'Dead Ned' Nussbaun	
2002	The Biggest Fan	Harold Worden	
2003	Dumb Luck	Special Agent Osborne	
2003	The Work and the Story	Oliver Wendelle	
2003	Cast and Mice	Cortez	
2004	Uh Oh!	Diablo	
2005	Diamond Zero	Detective Jackson	
2005	Angels with Angles	Robert the bartender	
2006	Nightmare Man	Captain McCormack	
2007	Headless Horseman	Kolchak Jefferson Stillwall	
2008	A Four Cent Carol	The Ghost of Hollywood Future	Short film
2008	The Kitty Landers Show	Old Man MacGruder	Short film
2008	Thomas Kinkade's Christmas Cottage	Big Jim	
2009	Love at First Hiccup	Store owner	
2011	Hazelwood	Dr. Vulkovich	Short film
2011	Assassins' Code	Ernest Altman	
2012	DisOrientation	Mr. Mackenzie	
2012	Hemingway	The lawyer	
2012	Sorority Party Massacre	Kreeger	
2013	Jurassic: Stone Age	Judge Holt	
2014	BFFs	Ken	
2014	Satan's Pigs & Severed Heads: Making Evilspeak	Himself	Documentary short
2015	Kids vs Monsters	Butler	
2016	High Noon at the End of the Universe: The Making of Metalstorm	Himself	Video documentary short
2017	Razor	Jon Creadon	
2017	For Play	Morty	Short film
2017	Circus Kane	Pale man	
2018	Slay Belles	Officer Green	
TBA	Whispers and Shadows	Simon Blake	Post-production - Posthumous Release
TBA	Celluloid Wizards in the Video Wasteland: The Saga of Empire Pictures	Himself	Post-production - Posthumous Release

=== Television ===
Year	Title	Role	Notes
1978	Welcome Back, Kotter	Big Thug	Episode: "Beau's Jest"
1978	The Rockford Files	Ludes	Episode: "Three Day Affair with a Thirty Day Escrow"
1979	How the West Was Won	Mose	Episode: "The Enemy"
1979	Happy Days	Eugene	2 episodes
1979	The Jericho Mile	Joker Gibb	Television film
1979	Bigfoot and Wildboy	Lohr-Khan One	Episode: "The Secret Invasion"
1979	B.J. and the Bear	Willie	Episode: "Run for the Money"
1979	The Misadventures of Sheriff Lobo	Biker Leader Willie, Rufus	3 episodes
1979	Mark Twain: Beneath the Laughter	Stranger	Television film
1980	Buck Rogers in the 25th Century	Yarat	Episode: "Space Rockers"
1980	The Bad News Bears	Rust	Episode: "Lights Out"
1981	The Archer: Fugitive from the Empire	The Bovum Ferryman	Television film
1981	Best of the West	Prisoner	Episode: "The Prisoner"
1981	Here's Boomer	Harold, the Monster	Episode: "Camityville's Boomer"
1981	Laverne & Shirley	Louis Armstrong, Biker	2 episodes
1981	Bret Maverick	Sloate	2 episodes
1981	Mork & Mindy	Baba Gentle	Episode: "Alienation"
1981	The Time Crystal	Mayhu	Television film
1981	The Fall Guy	Ethan	Episode: "The Human Torch"
1982	T.J. Hooker	Mauler Mort	Episode: "Hooker's War"
1983	Savage Journey	Joseph Smith	Television film, credited as Charles Moll
1983	Remington Steele	Pimp	Episode: "Steele in the News"
1983	Fantasy Island	Omo	Episode: "Love Island/The Sisters"
1983	Alice	Hank	Episode: "Sweet Erasable Mel"
1983	Just Our Luck	Currently Unknown	Episode: "Uncle Harry"
1983	The Dukes of Hazzard	Milo Beaudry	2 episodes
1984	The A-Team	Churlisco	2 episodes
1984	Match Game-Hollywood Squares Hour	Himself - Panelist	Recurring role, 10 episodes
1984–1985	Body Language	Himself	Recurring role, 13 episodes
1984–1987	Super Password	Himself	Recurring role, 35 episodes
1984–1992	Night Court	Aristotle Nostradamus "Bull" Shannon	Main role – 193 episodes
1985	Santa Barbara	Morgan Malone	2 episodes
1985	The $25,000 Pyramid	Himself - Celebrity Contestant	5 episodes
1985	The $10,000 Pyramid	Himself - Celebrity Contestant	5 episodes
1985	The NBC All Star Hour	Himself	Television special
1986	Alvin Goes Back to School	Mr. Conroy	Television film
1986	Combat Academy	Col. Felix Long Sr.	Television film
1987	If It's Tuesday, It Still Must Be Belgium	Currently Unknown	Television film
1987	The Facts of Life	Richard Moll	2 episodes
1987	Sledge Hammer!	Dr. Arthur Deco	Episode: "Hammeroid"
1988–1992	An Evening at the Improv	Himself - Host	2 episodes
1989	My Two Dads	Nostradamus "Bull" Shannon	Episode: "Playing with Fire"
1989	Dream Date	The Man in the Theater	Television film
1989	Class Cruise	Saunders	Television film
1989	Monsters	Arturus	Episode: "The Demons"
1989	Murphy's Laws of Golf	Golf Police	Short film
1989–1990	Out of This World	Skull Basher, Driver License Examiner	2 episodes
1990	227	Burnie	Episode: "Where Do We Go from Here?"
1990	The American Film Institute Presents: TV or Not TV?	Brain on Drugs Breakfast Guy	Television film
1990	The Munsters Today	Gengas Khan	Episode: "It's My Party and I'll Die If I Want To"
1991	The Last Halloween	Hans	Television short
1992	Highlander	Slan Quince	Episode: "The Gathering"
1992	Making of "Highlander: The Series"	Himself - Slan Quince	Television film documentary
1992	Martin	Officer Warren	Episode: "The Great Payne Robbery"
1992	CBS Schoolbreak Special	Coach Hillman	Episode: "Words Up!"
1992–1994	Batman: The Animated Series	Harvey Dent / Two-Face, Batcomputer (voice)	12 episodes
1993–1994	Mighty Max	Norman (voice)	Recurring role
1993–1994	Getting By	Boo	5 episodes
1994	Summertime Switch	Jimmy	Television film
1994	Due South	Zaleb Carney	Episode: "They Eat Horses, Don't They?"
1994–1997	Dr. Quinn, Medicine Woman	John	4 episodes
1995	Hercules: The Legendary Journeys	The Cyclops	Episode: "Eye of the Beholder"
1995	Babylon 5	Max	Episode: "Hunter, Prey"
1995	Baywatch	Trapper	Episode: "Home Is Where the Heat Is"
1995	The Twisted Tales of Felix the Cat	Additional voices	Episode: "Wet Paint/News Blues/Copy Cat"
1996	Adventures of Smoke Bellew	Currently Unknown	Miniseries, 6 episodes
1996	Weird Science	Frankestein's Monster	Episode: "Searching for Boris Karloff"
1996	Married...with Children	Gino	2 episodes
1996	7th Heaven	Mike 'The Mutant' Mitchell	Episode: "Halloween"
1996	Superman: The Animated Series	Emperor Spooj (voice)	Episode: "The Main Man"
1996	Freakazoid!	Vorn the Unspeakable (voice)	Episode: "Statuesque"
1996	Aaahh!!! Real Monsters	Big Bunny, Gangster #1	2 episodes
1996–1997	The Incredible Hulk	Abomination (voice)	Recurring role
1997	The Legend of Calamity Jane	Additional voices	13 episodes
1997	Happily Ever After: Fairy Tales for Every Child	Dinky (voice)	Episode: "The Pied Piper"
1997	Sabrina, the Teenage Witch	Sergeant Slater	Episode: "Sabrina Gets her License (Part 2)"
1997	Spider-Man	Mac Gargan/Scorpion (voice)	Recurring role
1997–1998	The New Batman Adventures	Harvey Dent / Two-Face (voice)	2 episodes
1998	Cow and Chicken	TV Anchor, Chef (voice)	Episode: "Sumo Cow/Comet!"
1998	Oh Yeah! Cartoons	Kenny, Driver	Episode: "Protecto 5000"
1998	The Ransom of Red Chief	Filthy McNasty	Television film
1999	The Parent 'Hood	Sam Bates	Episode: "Front Window"
1999–2002	100 Deeds for Eddie McDowd	Drifter	Recurring role, 25 episodes
1999	The Wacky Adventures of Ronald McDonald	Org's Dad (voice)	Episode: "The Visitors from Outer Space"
2000	Double Dare 2000	Himself - Contestant	Episode: "100 Deeds for Eddie McDowd vs. The Amanda Show"
2001	Call Me Claus	Brooding Claus	Television film
2001	The Defectors	Al	Television film
2002	The Zeta Project	Rodin Krick (voice)	Episode: "Lost and Found"
2002	Justice League	Java (voice)	Episode: "Metamorphosis"
2002	Smallville	Mr. Moore	Episode: "Nocturne"
2005	Game Show Moments Gone Bananas	Himself	1 episode
2007	The Fantastic Two	Duane Torn	Television Miniseries
2008	Whatever Happened To?	Himself	Episode: "TV Giants"
2010	Cold Case	Chuck "French" Jaworski '10	Episode: "The Runaway Bunny"
2010	Batman: The Brave and the Bold	Harvey Dent / Two-Face, Lew Moxon (voice)	Episode: "Chill of the Night!"
2010	The 8th Annual TV Land Awards	Himself	Television special
2010	Scooby-Doo! Curse of the Lake Monster	Elmer Uggins	Television film
2012	Lake Effects	Old Vic	Television film
2013	Anger Management	Carlos	Episode: "Charlie and the Airport Sext"
2013	Ghost Shark	Finch	Television film
2015	Kirby Buckets	Mr. Bostwick	Episode: "The Rise and Fall of 4th Period"
2016	Pub Quiz	Berwick	Television film

=== Video games ===
Year	Title	Role	Notes
1996	The Adventures of Batman & Robin Activity Center	Two-Face	
1997	Fallout: A Post-Nuclear Role-Playing Game	Cabbot	
1997	Outlaws	'Gentleman' Bob Graham	
2005	The Incredible Hulk: Ultimate Destruction	Devil Hulk	
2010	Dante's Inferno	Death / King Minos	
