= Batman's utility belt =

DC Comics equipment

Publication information
- Publisher: DC Comics
- First appearance: Detective Comics #29 (July 1939)
- Created by: Gardner Fox

In story information
- Type: Costume, Equipment
- Element of stories featuring: Batman

Batman's utility belt is a feature of Batman's costume. Similar belts are used by the various Robins, Batgirl, and other members of the Bat-Family.

== History ==
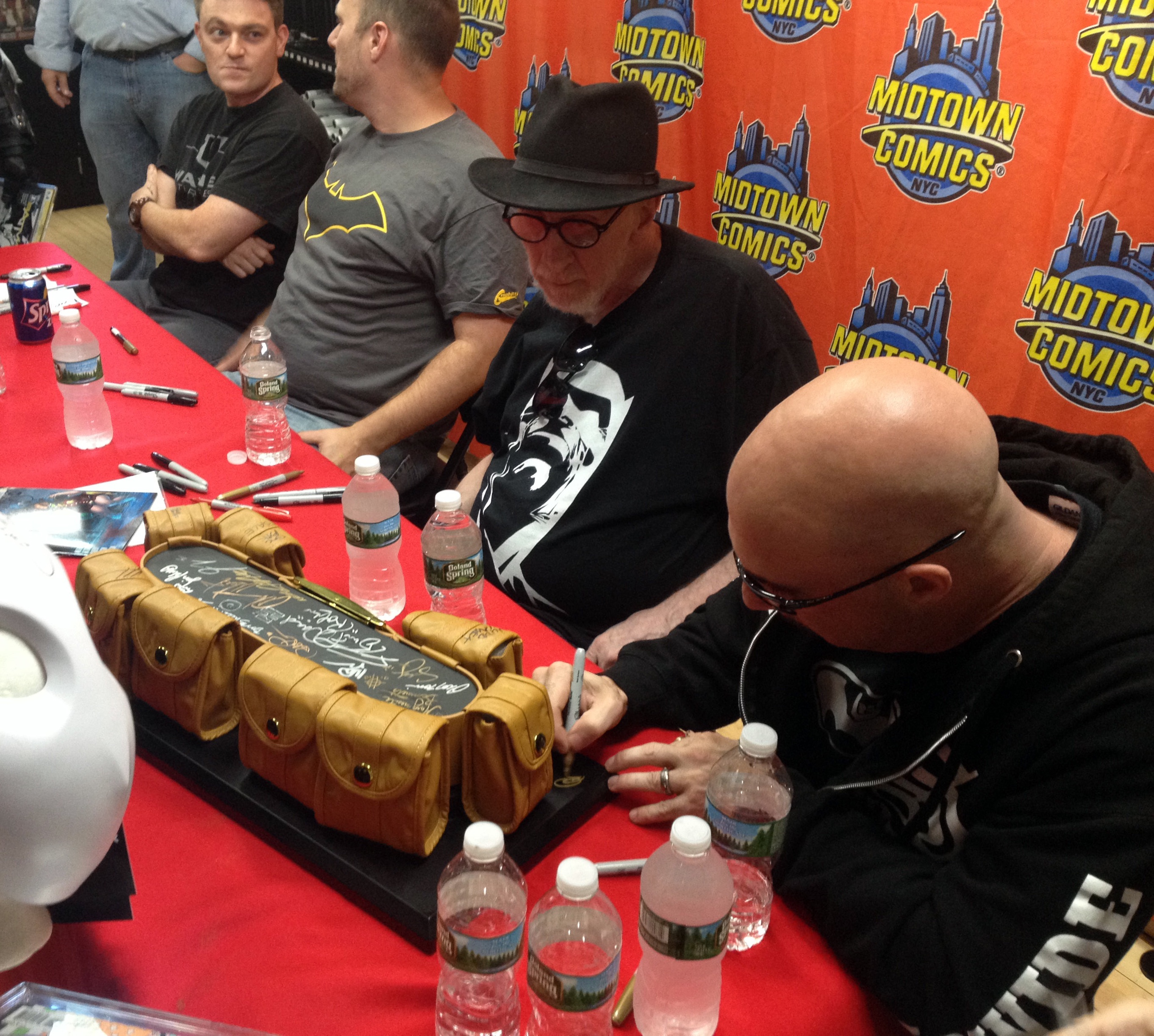
Artist Greg Capullo signs a replica Batman utility belt during an appearance at Midtown Comics in Manhattan. Beside him from left to right are Batman writers Scott Snyder, Tom King, and Frank Miller.

Batman historian Les Daniels credits Gardner Fox, the first writer other than Bill Finger to write the adventures of Batman in Detective Comics, with introducing the utility belt concept in Detective Comics #29 (July 1939).

In its first appearance, Batman's utility belt "contain[ed] choking gas capsules."

Two issues after the utility belt debuted, Fox also wrote the first appearance of a bat-themed weapon, when the batarang debuted in the story "Batman vs. the Vampire" in Detective Comics #31 (Sep 1939).

Up until 1989, most artists drew the utility belt as a simple yellow belt with a buckle and capsules/cylinders around it (except artist Graham Nolan, who included two pouches on the back of the utility belt).

In 1986, Frank Miller drew Batman's utility belt with military-style pouches in the Batman: The Dark Knight Returns limited series. This rendition was used again in Batman: Year One and used by almost every artist in the Batman: Legends of the Dark Knight comics series.

In 2000, the pouches became a standard feature in the depiction of the utility belt.

The grapple gun, which fired the Batline/Bat-rope (it had to be thrown manually prior to that), was first introduced in Tim Burton's live-action film, Batman. One feature added to the utility belt in the film and its sequel Batman Returns, was a small motor which would move items from the back of the belt around to the front allowing Batman easier access to his weaponry and tools.

== Description ==
Although seemingly unremarkable in appearance, the utility belt is one of Batman's most important tools in fighting crime. Consisting primarily of a strap and buckle, the utility belt houses ten pouches or cylindrical cartridges that are attached to the outside of the belt. The buckle itself typically contains a miniature camera and a tape recorder. A secondary compartment behind the length of the belt houses Batman's supply of batarangs.

Each of the ten pouches or cylinders contains various tools integral to Batman's war on crime, with the cylinders being interchangeable with each other. Through the years, Batman has modified the contents of his belt to accommodate various crime-fighting scenarios.

Most versions of the belt contain security features to prevent anyone other than Batman from opening it. The belt is shown to be able to electrocute any villain who even touches it. It can also release stun gas to prevent tampering. The belt's compartments are locked and only Batman knows how to open them.

== Contents ==
Elements of the utility belt at times include, but are not limited to, the following:

=== Batarang ===
Batarangs are customizable throwing weapons, based on shurikens and boomerangs, and are collapsible so that a large number of them can fit inside of Batman's utility belt.

=== Batman's grappling hook ===
Also known as Batline, Batrope, Batclaw and Batgrapple.

A handheld grappling hook that shoots out a claw-shaped projectile on a retractable high-tensile cord, which grabs onto a surface.

Then, this cord pulls Batman to his target. A later boost upgrade launches him high into the air above the target point if he desires, allowing him to glide from there.

The hook can also pull down walls, grab enemies and pull them closer, or pull guns straight out of their hands. The hook is secured to the belt magnetically rather than being contained in the belt.

It has been portrayed as a portable grappling hook line to be manually thrown onto a higher surface or vantage point for him to climb it to the targeted area.

However, in more recent incarnations, his overall grappling gear is composed of a line-launching, gun-like device that shoots the line to pull Batman towards his targeted area or to pull a target towards Batman.

A rifle-like grappling gun first appeared in Frank Miller's Batman: The Dark Knight Returns #1. However, the now standard hand-held version of Batman's grappling gun first appeared in the 1989 Batman film.

It gradually replaced the batarang and a rope in the comics after artist Norm Breyfogle introduced a grapple gun in Batman #458 in January 1991.

The tool became the standard in the subsequent animated series, comics, films, and video games such as Batman: Arkham Asylum and in Batman: Arkham City a more advanced version called the Grapnel was introduced which could be used to launch Batman into the air to glide using kinetic energy.

=== Cryptographic sequencer ===
With this computer-like device, Batman can hack into computer systems, communications frequencies, etc. Seen in the Batman: Arkham video game series.

=== Bolas ===
Thrown around the feet of Batman's enemies to tie them with a composite-nylon cord. Often causes an escaping opponent to trip. With the push of a button in Batman's glove it can deliver an electric shock.

=== Tracers ===
Used to track enemies Batman cannot follow closely. They also function as miniature listening devices to listen in on conversations from afar. Sometimes fired from a modified pistol, as shown in Batman vs Superman.

=== Smoke pellets ===
Large amounts of smoke can be deployed by throwing or breaking open these small hardened-gelatin spheroid capsules.

Often used to quickly provide cover for Batman's stealthy exits and entries. The lenses in Batman's cowl can see perfectly through the smoke.

=== Gas pellets ===
Similar to smoke pellets, gas pellets are used for incapacitating opponents.

Lachrymatory, anesthesia, nerve, and regurgitant agents are deployed by breaking open the capsules. A gas filter in the cowl's nose-piece allows Batman to be around the gas unharmed.

=== Line launcher ===
A device that shoots out a steel line in both directions making a zip line, or a tightrope to walk on.

Seen in Batman, Batman Returns, Batman: Arkham Asylum, Batman: Arkham City and Batman: Arkham Knight.

=== Tranquilliser gun ===
This collapsible gun fires darts that are tipped with fast-acting anaesthesia, paralytic agents, or other chemicals/drugs.

In Batman: Year One, this is replaced (or possibly preceded) by a blowpipe kept in one of the boots.

=== Glue globules ===
Small round globules of concentrated adhesive glue. They are used to encase enemies in a sticky substance.

The globules can be thrown or fired with a small gun. Seen in Superman/Batman: Public Enemies, Batman: Arkham Origins and in the webseries Gotham Girls.

=== Lock pick ===
This gadget is used to escape handcuffs and access locked rooms. It is rarely kept in the utility belt, more often in one of Batman's gloves.

=== Rebreather ===
This cylindrical device allows Batman to breathe underwater or in low oxygen environments. It is very small and compact so it fits easily into the utility belt. The standard rebreather gives 2.5 minutes of oxygen.

=== Acetylene Torch ===
A small blowtorch used as a cutting tool.

=== Pellet grenades ===
These small explosives are often used to knock down walls.

=== Mini Multi-tool ===
This is a miniature multipurpose tool with a pair of small pliers and different screwdrivers used for repairing small things.

=== Explosive gel ===
A gel-like substance which can be remotely detonated for an explosion.

It is contained in a spray device which also acts as a remote detonator. Seen in Batman: Arkham video games.

=== Thermite grenades ===
An incendiary used to burn through obstacles.

The fires produced by these grenades are fueled by thermite, and thus are impossible to extinguish and burn at over three times the temperature of molten magma.

In Batman: Year One, the thermite charge ignites accidentally and destroys the utility belt.

=== Napalm ===
This incendiary gel is kept in delicate packets. Once thrown or broken open, the packets release the napalm gel, which sticks to whatever it comes on contact with and instantly ignites. Seen in the film Batman Returns.

=== Folding water bottles and water filter ===
2 collapsible silicone water bottles for carrying water when needed and a water filter.

=== Remote electric charge ===
This small collapsible gun fires powerful bolts of high current electricity.

It is used to incapacitate enemies at long range or overload electronic devices. Seen in the video games Batman: Vengeance, Batman: Arkham City and Batman: Arkham Knight.

=== Stun pellets ===
Emit bright light and loud sound to completely blind and deafen enemies. The effect wears off in a few minutes, however. Batman is unaffected by these due to his cowl's lenses and sound dampening systems.

=== EMP gun ===
Used to disable any electrical equipment.

=== Disruptor ===
Batman's disruptor can remotely disable firearms and deactivate explosives.

=== Remote claw ===
Confiscated from Deathstroke, this gadget is used to join two objects and pull them together.

It works by firing a projectile out which hooks onto an object. The projectile then launches a rope-attached claw, which attaches to a second object. Once both are connected, they are pulled together.

Batman can use this to knock enemies together, slam heavy objects into foes, or string objects up. Seen in the video game Batman: Arkham Origins.

=== Ultrasonic bat beacon ===
This device emits sonic waves that attract thousands of bats to Batman's location. The bats swarm around him, creating a diversion, as well as sometimes attacking assailants and reinforcing the idea that Batman is a supernatural entity. It is usually kept in the heel of a boot rather than the utility belt. Seen in Batman: Year One and Batman Begins.

=== Sonic devastator ===
This small device, when activated, releases high energy sonic waves that can shatter glass and completely incapacitate enemies, making them writhe in agony.

It has a range of a few hundred feet. Sound dampening systems built into the cowl leave Batman unaffected.

Seen in Batman: The Animated Series and Injustice: Gods Among Us. This device is rarely kept in the utility belt. Rather, it is kept in one of the gloves.

=== Freeze grenades ===
Based on technology created by Mr. Freeze, these grenades encase anything in their blast radius in a block of ice.

They are useful for freezing enemies to incapacitate them, as well as freezing water to create ice platforms to walk on. Seen in the video game Batman: Arkham City and Batman: Arkham Knight.

=== Kryptonite ===
Batman keeps a chunk of kryptonite (in some stories, a ring with a kryptonite gem, implied to have originally belonged to Lex Luthor) in his belt in a lead lined compartment in order to take down any hostile Kryptonians.

In the Justice League TV series Batman calls his kryptonite "insurance", but in some continuities Superman himself gives the kryptonite to him as a sign of trust. By giving Batman the kryptonite, Superman understands Batman's wariness of his power and trusts Batman to subdue him should he go astray.

=== Mini First- Aid Kit ===
A standard medical kit for injuries.
