= Martha Wayne =

DC Comics character

- Martha Wayne in Detective Comics #853 (June 2009). Art by Andy Kubert.

Publication information
- Publisher: DC Comics
- First appearance: Detective Comics #33 (November 1939)
- Created by: Bill Finger (writer); Gardner Fox (writer); Bob Kane (artist); Jerry Robinson (artist)

In-story information
- Full name: Martha Kane
- Supporting character of: Thomas Wayne (husband); Bruce Wayne (son); Damian Wayne (grandson); Helena Wayne (granddaughter); Kate Kane (niece); Jacob Kane (brother)
- Notable aliases: Joker (Flashpoint)

Martha Wayne (née Kane) is a fictional character appearing in American comic books published by DC Comics. She is the mother of Bruce Wayne, and wife of Thomas Wayne as well as the paternal grandmother of Damian Wayne, the fifth Robin. After she and her husband are murdered in a street robbery, her son—orphaned—is inspired to fight crime by adopting the vigilante identity of Batman.

As a key figure in Batman's origin story, Martha Wayne has appeared in multiple forms of media. Notable portrayals of the character in live-action include Sara Stewart in Batman Begins, Lauren Cohan in Batman v Superman: Dawn of Justice, Carrie Louise Putrello in Joker, and Stella Stocker in The Batman. Emma Paetz also portrays her in the television series Pennyworth in a main role.

== Background ==
Martha Wayne first appeared in Detective Comics #33 (November 1939) in a story by Bob Kane and Bill Finger which detailed the origin of Batman. Initially little more than a cipher whose death inspired her heroic son, later comics would expand upon her history.

Born Martha Kane (a maiden name given in homage to co-creator Bob Kane), Martha was the heir to the Kane Chemical fortune and a member of one of Gotham City's wealthiest families. Following the reintroduction of Batwoman (Kate Kane) in the 2000s, it was revealed that she is the sister of Kate's father Jacob Kane Detective Comics #934 and the aunt of Bette Kane (Flamebird) in Batwoman #25, making her and Batman halachically Jewish. Martha had a reputation as a notorious party girl, socialite, and debutante, frequenting all the most prestigious country clubs, night clubs, and soirees. She also had a developed social conscience and often used her family's wealth and status to champion causes and charities.

As revealed in the miniseries Batman: Family by John Francis Moore, Martha's closest friend in those days was the woman Celia Kazantkakis. Both were renowned for their beauty, which caught the attention of a gangster named Denholm. Martha dated Denholm for a time prior to meeting Thomas Wayne, though she was unaware of his true nature at the time. Celia, who had had previous dealings with Denholm, became very protective of her friend and conspired to get this thug out of her life. In the process it came to light why Celia was familiar with him. Celia, it turned out, was a criminal herself and had been embezzling money from an orphanage that was one of Martha's charities. She attempted to hide the evidence of this by setting fire to the building but Martha discovered her duplicity. Before Celia departed for her family's home in Greece, Martha threatened to expose her should she ever return to Gotham. Celia would return to Gotham many years later as "Athena", the leader of a criminal cartel. In this guise, she attempted to stage a coup of Wayne Enterprises, until Batman discovered the true nature of his mother's history with Celia and defeated her.

Shortly after Celia's departure, Martha met and fell in love with prominent physician and philanthropist Dr. Thomas Wayne. They were wed soon after and Martha eventually gave birth to their son Bruce Wayne.

=== Murder ===
The Wayne family encounters Joe Chill, in Detective Comics #33 (November 1939)

When Bruce Wayne was eight years old, his parents took him to a screening of a Zorro movie at a cinema in Gotham's Park Row. Returning to the car through an alley, they were confronted by a lone gunman, who attempted to steal Martha Wayne's pearl necklace, an anniversary gift from Thomas. In the ensuing struggle, the thief shot both the Waynes dead (Later versions of the story claimed that only Thomas was shot; Martha died instead from the "shock" of his murder due to her having a weak heart. This retcon was ultimately undone, with Martha again being gunned down with Thomas.). In the wake of this tragedy, Park Row was given the nickname "Crime Alley".

The identity of the Waynes' killer has varied through different versions of the Batman story. Initially, he was said to be the criminal Joe Chill. Later retellings would claim that Chill had been hired by gangster Lew Moxon, an enemy of Thomas Wayne, and told to make the killings look like a robbery. After DC Comics' history-altering Zero Hour series, this interpretation was abandoned in favor of the Waynes' deaths being a random street crime. The killer was thought to have never been caught, adding to the tragedy and universality of Batman's origin. After the further continuity tweaks of the Infinite Crisis miniseries, DC has once again returned to the Joe Chill interpretation.

Since her death, Martha Wayne has only appeared in the Batman series in flashback and in the occasional out-of-body experience or hallucination. Her most significant appearance in this latter category is in the miniseries Batman: Death and the Maidens by Greg Rucka. In this story, Batman ingests an elixir given to him by his enemy Ra's al Ghul, and believes he is having a conversation with his dead parents. Martha is depicted here as a beautiful woman whose face is marred by a bleeding bullet wound, suggesting that Bruce remembers her this way because he has become 'focused' on her death rather than her life, the wound vanishing after she forces him to acknowledge that issue. Martha strongly disapproves of her son's costumed crusade, fearing he has thrown away his chance for happiness, although her husband notes that they disapprove of what being Batman has cost Bruce rather than disapproving of Batman himself. As she and Thomas depart, they assure Bruce that just because the passing of time has lessened his grief does not mean that he no longer cares for them, and, as a result, Bruce is able to accept that he is Batman because he chooses to be, not because he has to be.

In Jeph Loeb's Batman stories, Bruce feels responsible for his parents' murder because he advised Martha to wear the infamous pearl necklace the night she was murdered. Had she not worn it, the mugger might have not killed them, or even have been attracted to them. In Death and the Maidens she claims that the pearls were fakes, and that she would not have worn real ones simply to go to the theater. As this experience may have been merely a hallucination, it is unknown whether or not this is true.

=== Alleged double life ===
The Batman R.I.P. storyline reveals that the Kanes hired a detective to prowl about the circumstances of her death, suspecting that Thomas Wayne married her for her money.

Many years later, the detective hired by the Kanes presents to Commissioner Gordon a dossier describing Martha as a helpless, frail woman hooked on drugs by an abusive husband, who frequently indulged in orgies and extramarital affairs, taking Alfred Pennyworth as her lover. Simon Hurt, head of the Black Glove cabal, admits that the stories and supposed evidence are clever forgeries designed to break Batman.

=== Streets of Gotham ===
In the series Streets of Gotham, Martha Wayne's history as a young woman was revised and elaborated further.

After her father was tricked into a shady investment deal by a mobster named Judson Pierce, which drained the Kane fortune and made him suffer a fatal heart attack, Martha became involved with charity work focusing on Gotham's poorest citizens. One of her main projects was raising support for the free clinic founded in Gotham's slums by doctor Leslie Thompkins.

During an attempt to solicit support from Gotham's elite, she had her first encounter with Thomas Wayne. Aside from being a well-regarded surgeon, Thomas was also an infamous playboy and party animal. He affirmed this reputation by being extremely drunk in public and vomiting on Martha's shoes, causing her to storm off in disgust despite his apologies.

Leslie's clinic also became a new target for Judson Pierce after he deemed it a key point for taking over the surrounding neighborhood. Pierce attempted to prey on Martha's poverty by offering cash to shut the facility down. Martha accepted Pierce's money, but filed it as a donation to keep the clinic running. Enraged, Pierce arranged to have Martha and Leslie assassinated.

Martha met Thomas Wayne a second time after he had Alfred chauffeur him to the clinic so he could apologize again. That same evening though, Pierce's hitmen also decided to make their move. Alfred was able to subdue the assailants, but not before Leslie suffered a minor gunshot wound. While Leslie recovered from her injury, Thomas volunteered to work in the clinic alongside Martha. Thomas became content with the work there and it was not long before Thomas and Martha became romantically involved. By the time Leslie returned to work, Thomas became an official sponsor of the clinic and used his vast resources to keep it running. Thomas also distanced himself from his hedonistic past, citing Martha as his inspiration to change.

=== The New 52 ===
In September 2011, The New 52 rebooted DC's continuity. In this new timeline, Martha Wayne is seen as a good, strong-willed mother worried about her child's future and the future of Gotham's children as well. It is revealed that when Bruce was three years-old, Martha was pregnant with a second child named Thomas Wayne Jr. Due to an accident orchestrated by the Court of Owls, the child was born prematurely and sent to Willowwood Asylum, although he is officially listed as having died 12 hours after his birth. After the murder of Thomas and Martha, the asylum ceased to receive proper funding and the staff started to abuse the children in their care. The Court of Owls offers to take a child who is possibly Thomas Jr. into their ranks, the child left in care after he was born premature with serious disabilities, and he is reborn as Lincoln March, a Gotham socialite and mayoral candidate. Thomas Jr/Lincoln blames Bruce for their parents' murders and the abuse he suffered, and becomes obsessed with getting revenge against his brother. Whether Lincoln really is Bruce's brother or a ploy set by the Court of Owls in order to enlist him in their ranks is left ambiguous; Bruce acknowledges that the evidence favoring March being Thomas Jr. makes sense, but is certain that his parents would have told him if he had a brother, and observes that every piece of evidence has an alternative explanation, but without a DNA test there is no way to be certain.

== Other versions ==
=== Superman: Red Son ===
An alternate universe version of Martha Wayne from Earth-30 appears in Superman: Red Son. This version is an anti-communist activist who is later killed by the NKVD under Commissar Pyotr Roslov.

=== Batman: Dark Knight Dynasty ===
Thomas and Martha Wayne in Batman: Dark Knight Dynasty (November 1997); art by Scott Hampton

An alternate universe version of Martha Wayne appears in Batman: Dark Knight Dynasty. This version was killed by Vandal Savage.

=== Flashpoint ===
The Joker (right) and Batman (left) of the Flashpoint universe; art by Dave Johnson

The alternate universe Flashpoint version of Martha Wayne is her universe's version of the Joker, and was driven insane after Joe Chill killed her son Bruce.

=== Planetary ===
An alternate universe version of Martha Wayne appears in Planetary. This version is a member of a resistance against the eponymous group before being killed by Elijah Snow.

=== Earth One ===
An alternate universe version of Martha Wayne appears in Batman: Earth One.

=== Holy Terror ===
An alternate universe version of Martha Wayne appears in Batman: Holy Terror. This version works in an underground clinic treating victims of the religious theocracy that rules most of Earth.

=== The New 52: Earth 3 ===
An alternate universe version of Martha Wayne from Earth-Three appears in Forever Evil. This version is a criminal who is later killed by Alfred Pennyworth.

=== DC Comics Bombshells ===
An alternate universe version of Martha Wayne appears in DC Comics Bombshells. This version was saved by Batwoman, leading Bruce Wayne to become Batman in the latter's honor.

=== Absolute Universe ===
An alternate universe version of Martha Wayne appears in Absolute Batman. This version is a social worker, widow of Thomas Wayne, and an active presence in Bruce's life. Additionally, she is a former member of the Court of Owls.

== In other media ==
=== Television ===
==== Live-action ====
- Martha Wayne appears in Gotham, portrayed by Brette Taylor.
  - A young Martha Wayne appears in Pennyworth, portrayed by Emma Paetz. This series explores Martha's past as an agent of the No Name League assisted by Alfred Pennyworth.
- Martha Wayne appears in a photograph in Titans.

==== Animation ====
- Martha Wayne appears in The Super Powers Team: Galactic Guardians episode "The Fear", voiced by Lucy Lee Flippin.
- Martha Wayne appears in Batman: The Animated Series, voiced by Adrienne Barbeau.
- An illusionary version of Martha Wayne appears in Justice League Unlimited episode "For the Man Who Has Everything", voiced by Linda Hamilton.
- Martha Wayne appears in The Batman (2004), voiced by Kath Soucie.
- Martha Wayne appears in Batman: The Brave and the Bold, voiced by Tress MacNeille in the episode "Invasion of the Secret Santas!", Pat Musick in "Dawn of the Deadman!" and by Julie Newmar in "Chill of the Night!".
- Martha Wayne appears in the Beware the Batman episode "Monsters", voiced by Gina Gershon.

=== Film ===
==== Live-action ====
- Martha Wayne appears in Batman (1989), portrayed by Sharon Holm. This version was killed by Jack Napier.
- Martha Wayne appears in Batman Forever, portrayed by Eileen Seeley.
- Martha Wayne appears in Batman Begins, portrayed by Sara Stewart.
- Martha Wayne appears in Batman v Superman: Dawn of Justice, portrayed by Lauren Cohan.
- Martha Wayne appears in Joker, portrayed by Carrie Louise Putrello.
- Martha Wayne appears in The Batman (2022), portrayed by Stella Stocker. Similarly to her portrayal in Batman: Earth One, this version's maiden name is Arkham instead of Kane. Additionally, she came from a wealthy family with a history of mental illness and witnessed her parents die in a murder-suicide as a child before spending years in and out of psychiatric hospitals as a result of the trauma.
- Martha Wayne, based on Sharon Holm's likeness, appears in a photograph in The Flash.

==== Animation ====
- Martha Wayne appears in a portrait depicted in Batman: Mask of the Phantasm.
- Martha Wayne appears in a flashback in Batman: Gotham Knight, voiced by Andrea Romano.
- Martha Wayne makes a non-speaking cameo appearance in Batman: The Dark Knight Returns.
- The Flashpoint incarnation of Martha Wayne / Joker makes a cameo appearance in Justice League: The Flashpoint Paradox, voiced by Grey DeLisle.
- Martha Wayne makes a non-speaking cameo appearance in Batman vs. Robin.
- Martha Wayne makes a non-speaking cameo appearance in Batman: Bad Blood.
- Martha Wayne appears in a photograph depicted in The Lego Batman Movie.
- Martha Wayne makes a non-speaking cameo appearance in Teen Titans Go! To the Movies.
- Martha Wayne appears in DC Super Heroes vs. Eagle Talon, voiced by Asa Ueno.
- Martha Wayne makes a non-speaking cameo appearance in Batman: Death in the Family.
- Martha Wayne appears in a flashback in Justice League Dark: Apokolips War.
- Martha Wayne appears in Batman: The Doom That Came to Gotham, voiced by Emily O'Brien.

=== Video games ===
- Martha Wayne appears in Batman: Dark Tomorrow, voiced by Erin Quinn Purcell.
- Martha Wayne appears in the Batman Arkham series, voiced by Tasia Valenza in Arkham Asylum, Andrea Deck in Arkham VR, and Salli Saffioti in Arkham Shadow.
- Martha Wayne appears in Scribblenauts Unmasked: A DC Comics Adventure.
- Martha Wayne appears in flashbacks in Batman: The Telltale Series, voiced by Lorri Holt.
- Martha Wayne appears in flashbacks in Lego Batman: Legacy of the Dark Knight.

=== Miscellaneous ===
- Martha Wayne appears in Batman: The Ultimate Evil, written by Andrew Vachss. This version headed a covert detective agency that focused on stopping sex trafficking and child sexual abuse with help from Commissioner Gordon and the family butler Alfred Pennyworth. Additionally, her and her husband Thomas Wayne's deaths were orchestrated by a pedophile ring that she was investigating.
- Martha Wayne appears in the Batman Black and White motion comic, voiced by Janyse Jaud.
