= Lew Moxon =

Publication information
- Publisher: DC Comics
- First appearance: Detective Comics #235 (November 1956)
- Created by: Bill Finger (writer); Sheldon Moldoff (artist)

In-story information
- Full name: Lewis Moxon
- Species: Human
- Team affiliations: Moxon Crime Family

Lewis "Lew" Moxon is a character appearing in American comic books published by DC Comics. He is most famous for hiring Joe Chill to murder young Bruce Wayne's parents in early versions of Batman's origin story, thus making him indirectly responsible for Batman's existence.

== Publication history ==
Lew Moxon first appeared in Detective Comics #235 and was created by Bill Finger and Sheldon Moldoff.

== Fictional character biography ==
=== Golden / Silver Age version ===
Roughly 10 years before their murder, Dr. Thomas Wayne and his wife Martha attend a costume party, to which Thomas wears a bat-like costume. Thomas is subsequently taken from the party at gunpoint to meet Lew Moxon, a criminal who forces the doctor to remove a bullet from his shoulder. After completing the operation, Thomas overpowers Moxon and his men and escapes. Moxon is then arrested and sentenced to ten years in prison for armed robbery. As he is taken away, he swears revenge on Thomas.

After being released from prison, Moxon tells Thomas that he will get someone else to exact revenge against him. It is suggested that Moxon ordered Joe Chill to kill the Waynes and make it look like a mugging, but to spare their son Bruce in order to leave a witness who will describe his parents' murder as a robbery gone wrong.

Bruce Wayne does not uncover Moxon's involvement until years later, learning that Moxon has been operating a blimp business and cannot remember hiring Chill due to suffering from amnesia. Determining that Moxon's blimp business is a front for illegal activities, Batman pursues him in Thomas's costume after his own is damaged. Regaining his memories and believing Batman to be Thomas's vengeful ghost, Moxon panics and runs into the street, where he is hit and killed by a truck.

=== Post Zero Hour version ===
Lew Moxon is reintroduced into post-Zero Hour continuity as an aging mob boss with failed political aspirations who returns to Gotham City after years in self-imposed exile. However, his motivations and desire for revenge against Thomas Wayne are largely the same as his previous iteration. Following a failed assassination attempt by Deadshot, Moxon loses his ability to walk and is later killed by his former bodyguard Zeiss during Batman: War Games.

== In other media ==
- Lew Moxon appears in the Batman: The Brave and the Bold episode "Chill of the Night!", voiced by Richard Moll. This version ordered Thomas Wayne's murder and expresses regret over Martha Wayne's death and Bruce Wayne becoming an orphan.
- An alternate universe version of Lew Moxon appears in the Justice League: Gods and Monsters tie-in comic, where he is killed by his universe's Batman.

== See also ==
- List of Batman family enemies
