= Batman (Jace Fox) =

- Jace Fox as Batman, as depicted in I Am Batman #15 (November 2022). Art by Jeff Spokes.

Publication information
- Publisher: DC Comics
- First appearance: As Timothy Fox: Batman #313 (April 1979); As Batman: Dark Nights: Death Metal #7 (January 2021)
- Created by: Len Wein; Irv Novick

In-story information
- Species: Human
- Team affiliations: Terrible Trio; Batman Family; New York City Police Department; Power Company
- Partnerships: Katana; Tiffany Fox; The Signal
- Notable aliases: The Vulture
- Abilities: Genius-level intellect, advanced hand-to-hand combat, marksman, and highly skilled acrobat and gymnast.; Utilizes high-tech equipment and weapons

Timothy "Jace" Fox is a superhero appearing in American comic books published by DC Comics. Created by Len Wein and Irv Novick, he first appeared in Batman #313 (1979) as the son of Lucius Fox, a longtime ally of Batman. After years of absence, the character reemerged during the Infinite Frontier relaunch with a rebooted origin as well as starring in the I Am Batman comic series.

The current version of the character is a former hedonistic playboy whose irresponsible lifestyle led to a hit-and-run killing. When his father uses his wealth to suppress his culpability and ships him to military school, Tim's relationship with his family is strained. After graduating school and becoming an adult, Tim secretly spent his time as a covert mercenary, trained by Katana and other mentors under the name Jace before returning to Gotham, where tensions between himself and his family continue. Learning of his father's involvement with Batman, he adopts the Batman mantle and later begins operating in New York City while reconciling his relationship with his family. As Batman, Jace Fox differs from the original in his more restrained approach to crime-fighting and how his identity as an African-American influences his outlook and perception as a vigilante.

== Publication history ==
Timothy Fox first appeared in Batman #313 in 1979, and was created by writer Len Wein and artist Irv Novick. Initially a minor character, Fox appeared less than ten times prior to his reemergence. In 2020, Fox was reinterpreted under the name Jace Fox and was given a new origin during the Infinite Frontier initiative, appearing as the new Batman in the "Future State" event. In October 2021, Fox starred in the I Am Batman ongoing comic series, following the character adopting the Batman mantle. Fox's status quo being in New York City was announced shortly after, slated to take place in the sixth issue of the series.

== Characterization ==
"Jace’s origin is completely different. He was the one who inflicted damage on a family. He was the one who shattered a family. He was the one who literally ran from responsibility. And he realizes he has a responsibility, not just to fight crime, but to inspire people to do better. To inspire them as a person, certainly to inspire them as a young Black person. To be part of the solution and not just wait for the system, because the system too often fails, but to have a moral compass, because he saw what happens when justice is, in his opinion, perverted by his father, who had all the means in the world to put his thumb on the scales of justice."

— John Ridley

While discussing the character's status quo in relocating to New York City, John Ridley explained the series was intended to focus on a Batman story with a character whose ties were to the Fox family. While Luke Fox's character was considered for the exploration, Ridley believed Tim to be a better fit due to Luke's character being established; it would have required reconceptualizing Luke to fit a new direction. Ridley believed that Jace also represented the discord within the Fox family in the narrative already being estranged from prior stories. He wanted to build off of those previous stories. Ridley intended for Jace's origin and approach to be different from one another. Original Batman operates using fear to make villains feel the same kind of fear he had when witnessing his parents' death. Jace was the individual who caused rifts in his family due to evading responsibility thanks to his father's wealth and influence within the criminal justice system. He seeks to both own up to his faults and ultimately inspire others (including African Americans) to do the right thing rather than wait for the criminal justice system to address moral failings.

Ridley also intended for Jace's methods to include a reluctance in how he uses his wealth to fight crime, the character having witnessed how it can obstruct justice. He also operates with a different level of restraint which makes him more compliant with local law enforcement's methods. In the I am Batman series, the character is deputized as part of local law enforcement by the mayor.

== Fictional character biography ==
=== Pre-Crisis ===
Timothy Fox was the son of Wayne Enterprises CEO Lucius Fox. The two fell out due to Wayne's competitor Gregorian Falstaff, who fabricated evidence that Bruce Wayne was a slumlord. Protesting his father and his business, Tim joined a gang led by his friend Ron Watkins, who was secretly an employee of Falstaff. After learning the truth about Watkins and Falstaff, he left the gang and made up with his father.

Later on, Tim fell in with the criminal group called the Terrible Trio, taking on the identity of Vulture and attempting to rob guests of Bruce Wayne's penthouse, but was subdued and captured by Batman.

=== Infinite Frontier ===
After years of absence, Fox returned under DC's Infinite Frontier relaunch. In his rebooted origin, Tim, due to his family's immense wealth, became a hedonistic playboy, indulging in a jet set life of non-stop partying and promiscuous affairs. On the night before his seventeenth birthday, an angry Tim stormed out of his party after a failed attempt to seduce a girl who had caught his eye. While driving on the phone with another girl, Tim failed to notice a man crossing the street, ramming into him with his car. Tim went to check on the man, who was terribly injured, and, despite the man's pleas, Tim ran away to his father. Lucius hired a team of lawyers and private investigators to protect his son from legal consequences. It was discovered that the victim was an alcoholic domestic abuser, and the team made the case that he was too drunk to notice the traffic light change. When Tim protested his father's actions, he was shipped off to military school.

After a decade abroad being trained by multiple teachers, including that of Katana, Timothy, now known as Jace, returned home as his father inherited the Wayne Family's fortune. His return home briefly upended the family, with his sister Tamara falling into a coma, his brother Luke refusing to acknowledge him, and his sister Tiffany becoming estranged from Luke. Eventually, Jace discovered one of Bruce Wayne's old Batsuits in an abandoned area in Wayne Enterprises.

=== New Batman ===
Jace officially takes up the mantle of Batman, choosing to operate under the premise that both his father and Bruce Wayne represented a corrupt status quo. Following subsequent skirmishes with the Magistrate, Jace reconciles with Lucius and relocates to New York City to oversee his sister Tamara's medical recovery. Upon his arrival, Mayor Villaneuva forces Jace into a reluctant partnership with the NYPD's Special Crimes Unit, colloquially known as "Strike Force Bat". During this period, he faces his first major rogue, Manray; after a humiliating initial retreat, Batman defeats the villain in a subsequent encounter, straining his relationship with the police.

Concurrently, Jon Kent—operating as Superman—approaches Jace to join a new Justice League following the presumed death of the original team, though Jace rebuffs the offer to maintain his independence. Later, Jace teamed up with Renee Montoya (the Question) to investigate the murder of Anarky. The investigation revealed that while a youth named Morris Caulfield had shot Anarky, a radical group called "The Rest of Us" had already inflicted the lethal wounds. Following the case, Montoya passes the Question mantle to Jace's ally, Hadiyah. Meanwhile, Jace's sister, Tiffany Fox, begins operating as a vigilante, drawing the attention of Strike Force Bat. Shortly thereafter, Jace is targeted by Sinestro, who temporarily tricks him into believing he had murdered a police officer.

=== Dark Crisis and aftermath ===
Despite his previous reluctance to join a team, Jace eventually allies with Earth's remaining heroes during the events of Dark Crisis, helping defend the planet against the Dark Army and Deathstroke's forces. Following the resolution of the crisis and the conclusion of his activities with the NYPD Strike Force, Jace's localized series concluded, though the character remained established as the Batman of New York City within the broader DC Universe continuity.

=== I Am Batman ===
Amidst the killing of Tanya Fox's assistant, Lucius Fox comes home to New York City. After a period of turmoil involving his biological mother Elena Aiko being kidnapped, and the circumstances of Jace's birth coming to light, the Fox family is fractured. Despite this, Tiffany becomes an official partner of Batman's, and Hadiyah comes into her own as the hero Nobody.

=== Rise of the Power Company ===
In the midst of facing down a group of thugs in New York City, the Signal jumped into the fight. Unfamiliar to the specific teamwork fighting style that the Bat-Family uses, Batman is annoyed and initially rebuffs Signal's attempted introduction after the fight. However, the two quickly bond over their shared struggles.

After defeating the villain Geppetto and his zombies in New York City, Batman is contacted by the Signal and the Power Company for assistance in finding the murderer of his cousin Aaron. Despite continually refusing the offers to join, Batman conducts his own investigation of the murder. He later coordinates with Vixen and the Signal after they foil the Sons of Liberty's attempt to kidnap Aaron's friend Aki. Finding the killer, Agent Liberty, Batman defeats him alone. Batman resolves to help metahumans, joining with the Power Company in order to protect their communities.

== Powers and abilities ==
Similar to Batman and other human crime-fighters in Gotham, Fox possessed no inherent superpowers. Though he is skilled in hand-to-hand combat due to both his military training and mentorship under Katana. Furthermore, despite the character's view that both Luke and Lucius are geniuses, Jace also possessed a high level of intelligence within his own right. Jace also demonstrated strong willpower, a trait credited to making him worthy of the Batman mantle.

=== Equipment ===
Supplied by his friend Vol, Jace has a Batsuit designed with non-Newtonian fluid, allowing his armor to be powerful but lightweight.

== Other versions ==
A possible future version of Jace Fox / Batman appears in "Future State" as a member of the Justice League.

== In other media ==
Jace Fox / Batman appears in DC Legends.

== Collected editions ==
Title	Material collected	Published date	ISBN
Future State: The Next Batman	Future State: The Next Batman #1-4 and material from Future State: Dark Detective #1-3, Future State: Nightwing #1-2	June 2021	978-1779510648
Batman by John Ridley The Deluxe Edition	Future State: The Next Batman #1-4 and material from Batman Black and White (vol. 5) #1, Batman: The Joker War Zone #1	June 2021	978-1779511263
The Next Batman: Second Son	The Next Batman: Second Son #1-4 (original published online as The Next Batman: Second Son chapters #1-13)	September 2021	978-1779513601
I Am Batman Vol. 1	I Am Batman #0-5	August 2022	978-1779516619
I Am Batman Vol. 2	I Am Batman #6-10	March 2023	978-1779519979
I Am Batman Vol. 3	I Am Batman #11-18	September 2023	978-1779520548
