= Terrible Trio =

Supervillains in DC Comics

- The Terrible Trio as depicted on the cover of Detective Comics #253. Art by Sheldon Moldoff and Ira Schnapp.

Publication information
- Publisher: DC Comics
- First appearance: Detective Comics #253 (March 1958)
- Created by: Dave Wood; Sheldon Moldoff

In-story information
- Base(s): Portsmouth
- Member(s): Fox; Shark; Vulture

The Terrible Trio is a group of supervillains appearing in American comic books published by DC Comics, first appearing in Detective Comics #253 (March 1958). Individually known as Fox, Vulture, and Shark, their respective real names were originally Warren Lawford, Armand Lydecker, and Gunther Hardwick - though these have changed over the decades.

== Publication history ==
The Terrible Trio first appeared in Detective Comics #253 and were created by Dave Wood and Sheldon Moldoff.

== Fictional character history ==
The Terrible Trio are originally three famous inventors in Gotham City named Warren Lawford, Armand Lydecker, and Gunther Hardwick, who sought new challenges by starting a criminal career. As a gimmick, they dress up in business suits while wearing animal masks. From this, they become known as Fox, Shark, and Vulture. Tapping into their respective areas of expertise, they base their technology on their respective animal themes. The Trio are recurrent foes of Batman and Robin, but also battle G'nort and Doctor Mid-Nite.

A second group of Terrible Trio are a group of thugs who take on the identities of Batman's old foes. Batman soon realizes that one of the members is Lucius Fox's son Timothy. He and two other friends co-opt the identities of the original Trio and attempt to rob guests of Bruce Wayne's penthouse before Batman defeats him.

=== Doctor Mid-Nite ===
Art by John K Snyder III

In the Doctor Mid-Nite miniseries, the Trio have moved their operations to Portsmouth and become the industrial leaders Fisk, Shackley, and Volper, heads of the investment firm Praeda Industries. The Trio adopt their guises as part of rituals they perform to bring good fortune to their endeavors, calling upon elemental spirits. The Trio attempt to destroy much of the city, leaving only the property in the worst sections of the city - which they own and can sell for profit. As part of their plan, the Trio also operate as drug lords, selling the steroid A39 to create zombie-like soldiers. When Pieter Cross begins investigating their affairs, they attempt to kill him, but only succeed in blinding him. Doctor Mid-Nite foils the three's plans and they are sentenced to life imprisonment.

=== Detective Comics ===
The presumed-to-be-deceased Shark is named as Sherman Shackley. In this issue, Fox's last name is Fisk and Vulture's last name Volper, though no first names are given for either character. Shark, in an attempt to reinvent himself after suffering a psychotic breakdown, fakes his own death by replacing his teeth with shark teeth and attempts to murder his partners before Batman stops him. The Trio are imprisoned in Arkham Asylum, where Fox and Vulture ally with Great White Shark and the latter replaces Shark in the group.

=== DC Rebirth ===
In 2016, DC Comics implemented a relaunch of its books called "DC Rebirth", which restored its continuity to a form much as it was prior to "The New 52". There are two different versions of the Terrible Trio:

==== Gotham Academy's Terrible Trio ====
A new Terrible Trio is introduced in Gotham Academy: Second Semester. This Trio are three Academy students who are part of a secret society dedicated to the Academy's ghost Amity Arkham. Their leader is Amanda Lydecker (Fox), the descendant of the Dutch architect Ambroos Lydecker, who designed both the Academy and Arkham Asylum to honor Amity and who signed his work "Vos" (the Dutch word for "fox"). The other two members are Wendy Lawford (Shark) and Reiner Hardwick (Raven, rather than Vulture), who both immediately surrender when challenged by the Detective Club.

==== Unidentified Terrible Trio ====
A second Terrible Trio appears in a lead-up to "Year of the Villain", consisting of unknown men operating as Fox and Shark and an unnamed female operating as Vulture, who are all humans with the heads of their namesakes. The Terrible Trio are first seen in the Fat and Flesh Gastropub in Burnside, where they discuss Cormorant's failure in silencing Congresswoman Alejo and Batgirl looking for them. When Batgirl finds where Fox is hiding, she attacks him until Shark comes up from behind her. The Terrible Trio take Batgirl hostage and hold a masked party for the wealthy and wicked to tell them that they are now being blackmailed into giving them a third of their profits. The Terrible Trio attempt to kill Batgirl by drowning her, but she escapes and fights the Terrible Trio. During the fight, the building they are in is set on fire. As the fire rages, Batgirl tries to open the gate to save the patrons only to be attacked by Vulture. With Shark badly beaten, Fox leaves him for dead and knocks out Vulture to guarantee everyone's survival. Batgirl evacuates Vulture and the remaining attendees, but fails to rescue Shark as the building collapses.

Deep in the Blue Ridge Mountains, Fox and Vulture are with another Shark - Fox's second cousin Harry - as they find a robotic Oracle, whose creator previously discarded her. After a brief security error, Oracle persuades the Terrible Trio to take it to Gotham City. Upon arrival, the Terrible Trio learn that Oracle was created by Batgirl and set off an explosion in Burnside to lure her to them. As the Terrible Trio assist Oracle in looking for Batgirl with Jason Bard as their hostage, they confront Batgirl at Burnside Park, only to find dummies in each location. After Batgirl subdues Fox and Shark, she goes to where the hostages are and fights Oracle and Vulture. After Oracle self-destructs upon being defeated by Batgirl, the hostages are saved while Vulture is arrested, claiming that she was the victim.

== Other groups named Terrible Trio ==
There have been other groups that have been called Terrible Trio:

=== Captain Marvel villains ===
An unrelated Terrible Trio appears in Marvel Family #21, consisting of an unnamed satyr, Hydra, and Argus.

=== Superman villains ===
An unrelated Terrible Trio appears in Superman #88, consisting of Lex Luthor, Toyman, and Prankster.

=== Aquaman villains ===
An unrelated Terrible Trio appears in Aquaman #24, consisting of the Fisherman, the Invisible Un-Thing, and Fire-Haired Karla.

== In other media ==
=== Television ===
The Terrible Trio as they appear in The Batman

- The original Terrible Trio appear in a self-titled episode of Batman: The Animated Series, with Warren Lawford / Fox voiced by Bill Mumy, Armand Lydecker / Vulture voiced by David Jolliffe, and Gunther Hardwick / Shark voiced by Peter Scolari. This version of the trio are capitalists who each inherited family fortunes, with Lawford's coming from oil, Lydecker an aerodynamics firm, and Hardwick's shipping magnate father. Out of boredom, they turn to crime using the elements that gave them their fortunes as inspiration before they are eventually defeated by Batman and Robin and arrested.
- An original incarnation of the Terrible Trio appear in The Batman episode "Attack of the Terrible Trio", consisting of David / Fox (voiced by David Faustino), Justin / Shark (voiced by Googy Gress), and Amber / Vulture (voiced by Grey DeLisle), This version of the group are university students and social outcasts who utilize a modified version of Kirk Langstrom's formula to mutate themselves into humanoid animals and commit crimes for amusement and vindication. While transforming their bullies and fellow students against their will, their classmate Barbara Gordon / Batgirl alerts Batman to their activities. Using an antidote provided by Langstrom, they succeed in curing Amber and Justin. Though David is accidentally covered in mutagenic fluid meant for several other students and transforms into a chimeric griffin-like monster, he is ultimately defeated, cured, and sent to prison along with Justin and Amber.
- The Terrible Trio appear in the Batman: The Brave and the Bold episode "Return of the Fearsome Fangs!", with Fox voiced by Phil Morris, Vulture voiced by Edoardo Ballerini, and Shark having no dialogue. This version of the group are bored, unnamed millionaires and members of the Shadow Clan who become martial artists and wear masks of their totem animals while studying at the Wudang Temple alongside Batman and Bronze Tiger. The trio plot to steal the Wudang Totem, using its power to transform into monstrous versions of their totem animals, and take over Hong Kong until they are defeated by a totem-empowered Batman and Bronze Tiger.
- The Terrible Trio appear in promotional artwork released for Harley Quinn, but never appeared in the series.
- The Terrible Trio appear in the My Adventures with Superman episode "Party Animals", with Fox voiced by Andromeda Dunker, Vulture voiced by Vincent Tong, and Shark voiced by Ishmel Sahid. This version are the elite henchmen of Doctor Poison.
- The Terrible Trio appear in the Batman: Caped Crusader episode "Rocket's Red Glare", with Warren Lawford voiced by Bruce Thomas, Armand Lydecker voiced by Todd Haberkorn, and Gunther Hardwicke voiced by Darien Sills-Evans. This version are members of Triad Industries, with Lawford being the CEO, Lydecker being the head scientist, and Hardwicke being the security chief.

=== Miscellaneous ===
The Terrible Trio appear in Batman: The Brave and the Bold #11.

== See also ==
- List of Batman family enemies
