= Graham Nolan =

American comic book artist

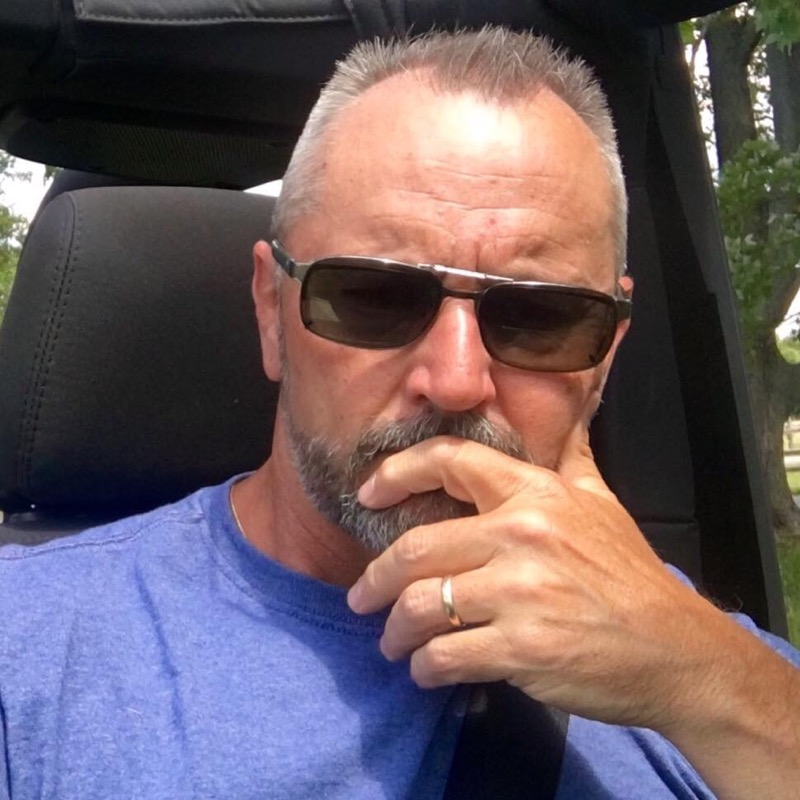
- Graham Nolan
- Born: March 12, 1962 (age 64) Long Beach, New York, U.S.
- Areas: Penciller, Inker
- Notable works: Batman, Detective Comics with Chuck Dixon, The Phantom
- Awards: Inkpot Award 2014

Graham Nolan (born March 12, 1962) is an American comic book artist, best known for work for DC Comics on Batman-related titles in the 1990s and his work on The Phantom Sunday strip. He frequently collaborates with writer Chuck Dixon.

== Biography ==
Nolan's first comics credit came in April 1985, when his work appeared in DC Comics' Talent Showcase #16, alongside Eric Shanower and Stan Woch (among others). Moving on to an issue of the Marvel Transformers comic, in 1988 he started a 12-issue run on DC's Power of the Atom comic. In June 1990, he launched John Ostrander and Tim Truman's Hawkworld comic, pencilling and inking it for 26 issues until late 1992. In 1992 he designed and co-created the Batman villain Bane. He also worked on many issues of Detective Comics, illustrating key parts of the KnightFall and KnightsEnd sagas featuring Azrael and Batman.

Graham Nolan also did freelance work for the Dungeons & Dragons game, including The Mines of Bloodstone (1986), Egg of the Phoenix (1987), The Endless Stair (1987), and The Complete Book of Villains (1994).

In 1998 he created and published his own comic book, Monster Island. Nolan tried to get a reformatted version into newspaper syndication but was told they no longer were buying adventure or "continuity" strips. King Features, instead offered him the art duties on their existing long-running medical soap opera strip, Rex Morgan, M.D. A couple months later he was offered the Sunday Phantom strip as well.

He left the Phantom strip in 2006 to work on other projects. He left Rex Morgan in 2013.

Since then Nolan has been busy writing and illustrating creator-owned projects like Joe Frankenstein for IDW, and Return to Monster Island for Ominous Press, as well as returning to Bane with Chuck Dixon for the 12-part series, Bane: Conquest.

In 2009, he created the webcomic Sunshine State.

The Phantom – The Graham Nolan Sundays Vol. 1

== Bibliography ==
=== Moonstone Books ===
- The Phantom: The Graham Nolan Sundays Vol. 1
- The Phantom: The Graham Nolan Sundays Vol. 2
- The Phantom Annual #1

=== DC Comics ===
- Astro City #12 (2014)
- Bane: Conquest #1–12 (2017–2018)
- Batman vol. 1 Annual #23 (1999)
- Batman vol. 2 #23.4, 36 (2013–2015)
- Batman 80-Page Giant #3 (2000)
- Batman and Superman: World's Finest #9 (1999)
- Batman: Bane of the Demon (1998)
- Batman: Brotherhood of the Bat (1995)
- The Batman Chronicles #8, 17, 19 (1997–1999)
- Batman Secret Files and Origins (1997)
- Batman & Spider-Man: New Age Dawning (1997)
- Batman: Vengeance of Bane (1993)
- Batman: Vengeance of Bane II The Redemption (1995)
- Batman Villains Secret Files and Origins (1998)
- Blackhawks #1–4 (2011–2012)
- Celebrate the Century Super Heroes Stamp Album #2 (1998)
- Countdown #7 (2008)
- DC Universe Holiday Bash #1 (1997)
- Detective Comics #0, 650–653, 661–669, 671–678, 680–684, 687–688, 696–715, 717–718, 720–721 (1992–1998)
- Doom Patrol #16–18 (1988–1989)
- Elvira's House of Mystery #9 (1986)
- Green Lantern 80-Page Giant #3 (2000)
- Hawkworld #1–19, 21–26 (1990–1992)
- JLA Versus Predator (2001)
- The Joker: Devil's Advocate (1996)
- Justice League Dark #14 (2013)
- Metamorpho #1–4 (1993)
- Ms. Tree Quarterly #1–3 (1990–1991)
- New Talent Showcase #14 (1985)
- Power of the Atom #7–18 (1988–1989)
- Sgt. Rock Special #2 (1994)
- Suicide Squad Annual #1 (1988)
- Superman: The Odyssey (1999)
- Talent Showcase #16 (1985)
- Talon #9 (2013)
- War That Time Forgot #10–11 (2009)

=== Eclipse Comics ===
- Airboy #25–26, 29–33 (1987)
- Airboy Meets the Prowler (1987)
- Alien Encounters #13–14 (1987)
- Prowler #2–4 (1987)
- Prowler in White Zombie (inks over Gerald Forton) (1988)
- Revenge of the Prowler (1988)
- Tales of Terror #13 (1987)

=== Compass Comics ===
- Alien Alamo (2021)
- Monster Island (1998)
- The Chenoo (2020)

=== Marvel Comics ===
- Amazing Spider-Man #647 (2010)
- Captain America: Hail Hydra #5 (2011)
- Heroic Age: One Month to Live #4 (2010)
- Marvel Adventures Fantastic Four #38 (2008)
- Marvel Adventures Iron Man #7, 9–10 (2008)
- The New Avengers #2 (2005)
- Peter Parker: Spider-Man #18 (2000)
- Psi-Force #23, 25–26 (1988)
- Spider-Woman #8–9, 14 (2000)
- Transformers #16 (1986)
- Uncanny X-Men #378 (2000)
- War of Kings: Savage World of Skaar (2009)
- Web-Spinners: Tales of Spider-Man #13–14 (2000)
- What if ? #1 (2011)
- Wolverine #149 (2000)
- X-Men Forever #16–17, 19–20 (2010)
