= Batsuit =

Suit worn by Batman

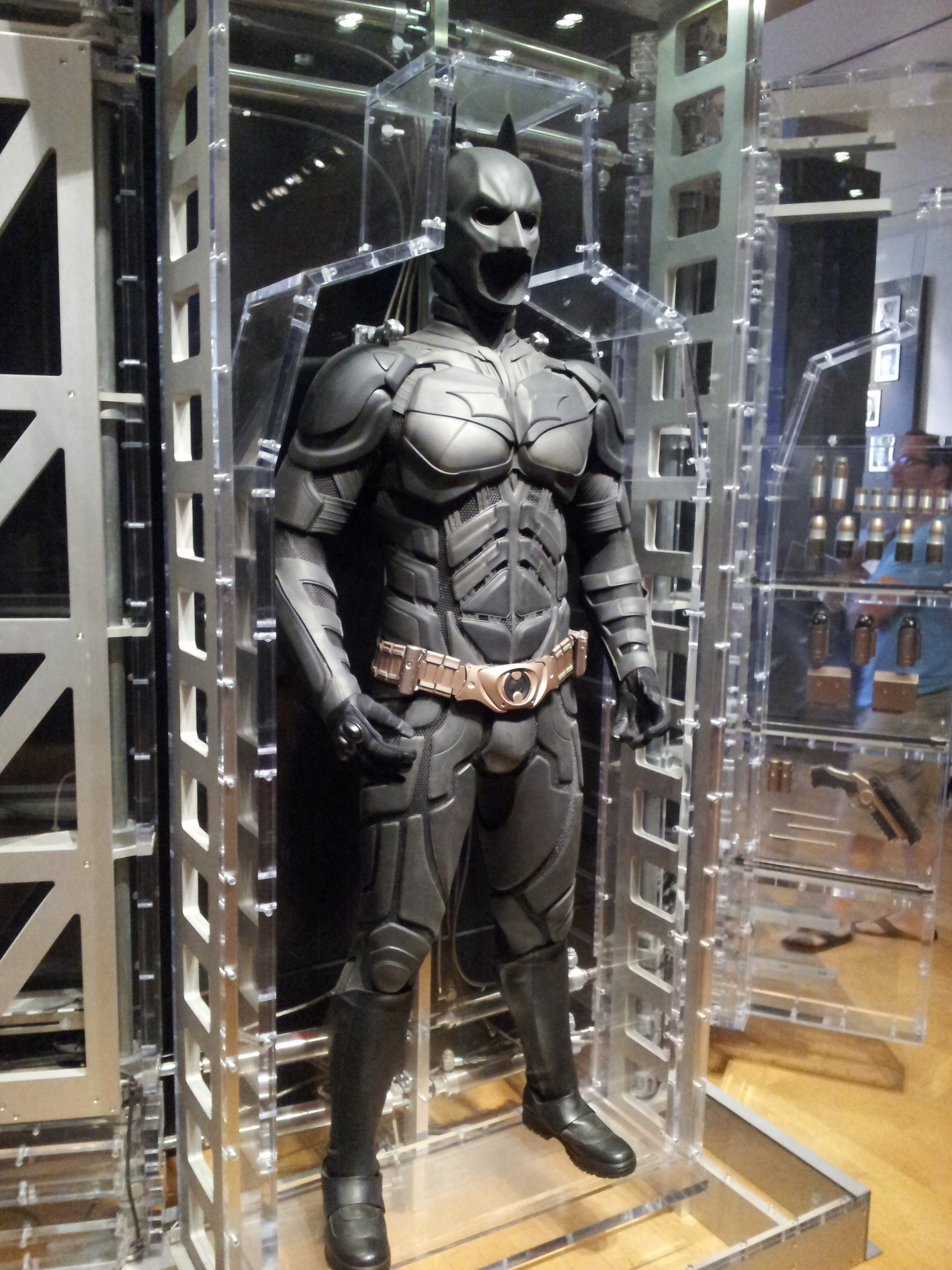
- Batman's suit from The Dark Knight Rises (2012)

Publication information
- Publisher: DC Comics
- First appearance: Detective Comics #27 (May 1939)
- Created by: Bill Finger; Bob Kane

In story information
- Type: Costume
- Element of stories featuring: Batman; Robin

The Batsuit (or Bat-Suit) is a fictional tactical costume worn by the superhero Batman, which appears in American comic books published by DC Comics, and related media. The suit has been depicted in various artistic iterations, and the stories themselves have described Batman as modifying the details of his costume from time to time. These iterations typically use military and SWAT standards materials and technology that evolved into an advanced combat suit. The Batsuit usually consists of a gray body suit, the chest emblazoned with a stylized black bat either with or without a yellow ellipse around it, and blue-black accessories: a wide scalloped cape, gloves with a series of fin-like projections, trunks, boots, and a close-fitting cowl (covering his head) with ear-like projections to suggest a bat's head; and a yellow utility belt containing a variety of gadgets.

== Origin and development ==
=== In-universe origin ===
While brooding in his study over how to be a more effective crime fighter, Bruce Wayne saw a bat come through his window. Reflecting that "criminals are a cowardly and superstitious lot," Bruce adopts the persona of a bat in order to conceal his identity and strike fear into his adversaries. In the later elaborations on the origin, Bruce is terrified by bats as a child, and in the Silver Age story The First Batman (later retold in the 1980 miniseries The Untold Legend of the Batman) the inspiration for the batsuit comes in part from a bat costume worn to a costume ball by his father Thomas Wayne.

=== Color scheme ===
Batman's cape, cowl, gloves, briefs, and boots are usually either black or dark blue with the body of the costume being grey. Originally the suit was conceived as being black and grey, but due to coloring schemes of early comic books, the black was highlighted with blue. Hence, over the years the black cape and cowl appeared as dark blue.

The bat symbol on the chest has also alternated from a simple black bat, to a bat design on a yellow ellipse. The yellow ellipse was introduced in 1964 as part of the "New Look" Batman stories. In Batman: The Dark Knight Returns, the yellow ellipse design was explained as being a heavily armored, intentional target, to draw enemy fire away from his unarmored head and body. A subsequent issue of Shadow of the Bat re-established the concept. The yellow ellipse was eventually removed in 2000 after a 36-year run and replaced by a larger stylized black bat-emblem, which resembles the one from the Golden Age comics. The ellipse made a comeback in 2021.

Other elements, such as the utility belt and the length of the cowl's ears, have been changed by various artistic teams.

=== Basic suit ===
Bob Kane's original sketch of the character was different from the Batman known today. Kane showed the first drawing of a character he had first named the Bat, then Bat-Man, to Bill Finger who was the writer he hired to write the first Batman stories. Finger thought that the character looked too much like Superman, so he suggested major changes that would prove to be everlasting to the character's legacy. Finger decided to make Batman's suit grey, conceptualized Batman's chest emblem, and gave Batman a cape rather than true wings.

The post-Crisis version of the bodysuit is made from durable materials that gives it resistance to tearing and has various defense and protection mechanisms layered into the suit's fabric. Batman utilizes many different body armor designs, some of which are constructed into his Batsuits, and others which are separate. In its most basic version, the suit is bulletproof around the upper torso and back. Other versions are entirely bulletproof to small arms fire, and have advanced flexible armor plating.

Batman intimidates a mugger with his oversized cape displaying its scalloped edges like wings, looking like a winged creature. Art by Gary Frank (penciller), Mark Farmer (inker), and Danny Zozzo (colorist).

=== Cape ===
The scalloped cape resembling the edges of a bat's wings are one of the two most instantly recognizable parts of Batman's silhouette along with the pointed ears on his head. As different artists have taken over the responsibility of drawing the costume, the nature of the cape have changed considerably. The first version of the cape was a wing-like structure that was suspended in the air rather than draping down. This was Bruce Wayne's homage a ballroom costume worn by his father Thomas Wayne. This eventually evolved into a more cape-like design of varying length. Modern writers have made the pointed edges of the cape into practical weapon. The material of the cape has varied with different writers, sometimes being depicted as bulletproof and fire resistant, and other times being made of simple fabric that tears easily and is continuously replaced.

Batman's usage of the cape as a mode of transportation differed over the years. Originally, Batman did not use the cape to glide. After Dick Grayson took over the identity of Batman, he and Damian Wayne developed a "para-cape" for their costumes which gives them an ability to glide.

In the 2010 comic book mini-series Batman Beyond, Grayson explains that there is also a tactical reason for adding a cape to the costume: misdirection. It "hides the body, makes it difficult to know where to strike" when Batman moves, with the result that villains attacking him at long range cannot determine whether they are shooting at Batman's body or just the cape.

=== Cowl ===
Batman's cowl taken from a variant cover of Detective Comics #1050 (January 2022). Art by Dan Mora.

The cowl mainly conceals Batman's features and contributes to his imposing appearance. In almost all comic book depictions, the eyeballs are not visible through the cowl. This was suggested by Batman co-creator Bill Finger during the character's creation to give him a more mysterious look. Instead, the eyes appear white without any visible eyeballs. This motif of white eyes behind a mask has been replicated in nearly every masked superhero following Batman's debut in 1939.

Occasionally, the cowl is depicted as having defense mechanisms such as electric shock or stun gas in order to prevent unauthorized removal. Batman also lines the cowl with lead to protect his identity from superhumans with the ability to see through his cowl. The cowl's lenses incorporate multiple vision modes like infrared vision (heat sensors), night vision, and ultraviolet vision, and a digital camera for obtaining evidence.

One of the cowl's ears carries a high-gain antenna for an internal communication device on the left side of the mask, allowing Batman to stay in contact with his allies. This communication device is capable of scanning police radios and other communication frequencies. It also carries an inertial navigation unit to keep him in balance when facing foes such as the Scarecrow or Count Vertigo.

In Batman: Cacophony, during Batman's hunt with the masked serial killer Onomatopoeia, he reinforced one of his masks with a secondary armor beneath its kevlar headpiece with bloodpack lining in anticipation of being shot in the skull, to create an opportunity to fake his own death to get himself closer to the villain.

=== Gloves ===
One of Batman's gloves as they appear in Batman vol. 2,#23 (August 2013). Art by Greg Capullo.

Batman is often depicted as wearing dark-colored gloves which extend to cover most of his forearms. In the earliest Batman stories of Detective Comics, the costume featured a few curiosities before it evolved in to its standard style. The first gloves were purple in color, ordinary looking, and lacked any sort of scalloped fins or other stylings, and only came to the wrists. The second Batman adventure depicted the character wearing no gloves at all. A few issues later the gloves became longer, and by 1940 the familiar fins were added. In early stories, these fins originally resembled miniature, scalloped bat wings, but eventually became three triangular fins.

In some later incarnations, the scallops are attached to a separated bracer worn below the glove around the wrist. Additionally, Batman hides a few pieces of his arsenal in his gloves, such as a lock pick and miniaturized batarangs. The knuckles of each glove have been depicted as containing a small amount of lead shot to increase the force of his blows.

=== Boots ===
In Batman: Year One, it is depicted that Batman hid a few pieces of his arsenal in his boots, such as a blowpipe (its length made it impossible to fit in Batman's belt compartment) with fast-acting anesthetic darts and (in the heel) an ultrasonic signalling device capable of calling live bats to it as a distraction and protective cover. The basic design of the boots are modeled on tactical boots, but they are made from lightweight rubbers and are much more flexible to allow for full extension when kicking. The bottom is a flexible split sole design and is textured for a variety of surfaces. The boots also have steel toes, making them much more effective when on the offensive.

=== Armor ===
The Batsuit has been repeatedly updated to reflect advances in technology. Originally the costume was a simple jumpsuit which contained no protective armor: however, the real world advent of various forms of personal protective materials like Kevlar and the realization that being shot while wearing such protection should still be avoided, has led to the costume being re-imagined with varying forms of bulletproof protection which employs the aforementioned use of the suit's chest symbol as a bull's-eye to lure shots at the armor's strongest point. Despite the armor, Batman almost always evades gunfire and is very rarely actually shot. Following the storyline "Batman: Knightfall", in which Batman had his back broken by Bane, Batman reinforced the armor with a spinal brace and a material to protect him from severe attacks.

During The Resurrection of Ra's al Ghul, Batman acquired an ancient suit of armor from Talia al Ghul, the Suit of Sorrows. According to its legends, it can impart strength and speed to its wearer but also would completely corrupt anyone whose heart and soul are not pure. At first, Batman was dubious of the legend, but eventually experienced aggressive behavior while wearing the armor during patrols. Batman later learns from a member of the Order of the Pure that the armor once belonged to a knight named Geoffrey de Cantonna, who massacred hundreds of people in an alpine valley in 1190. The Suit of Sorrows becomes one of the trophy displays within the Batcave, to remind Batman that he must be ever vigilant not only in his crusade against crime, but also himself. The new Azrael takes up wearing the suit eventually.

In all eight one-shots of Bruce Wayne: The Road Home, which sets after the events of Batman: The Return of Bruce Wayne, show that Batman, acting as "The Insider", has developed an exosuit mimicking Amazo's capability of copying metahuman powers. There is a design flaw on this suit: it uses too much power to keep it functioning. Thus, Batman must only use it for a limited amount of time. Lucius Fox also supplies Bruce Wayne and his son Damian a pair of experimental jetsuit prototypes. They can provide artificially enhanced strength and endurance as well as short-range flight capability. The prototypes are considered too risky and expensive for operational military use, allowing the Waynes to utilize them for the family's Batman Inc. project.

=== Utility belt and other equipment ===
Batman's utility belt is his most characteristic prop. The exact contents of this belt are not known because Batman usually changes it to suit his needs. Batman's enemies are especially interested in the utility belt as they believe it will give them an advantage over him, but the belt's compartments are locked and only Batman knows how to open them. The utility belt is depicted as having defense mechanisms such as electric shock, locks, marker paint, or stun gas in order to prevent tampering. The belt is almost always yellow in color, and the look of the belt is usually depicted as having either capsule-like cylinders or military style pouches to store his equipment in. Following DC's 2016 initiative DC Rebirth, Batman's utility belt is depicted as being a black and yellow flat, compartmentalized belt.

The array of devices Batman carries have become more complex over time. The simple coiled rope and batarang scaling equipment became a rocket-powered (or compressed-air-powered) grapple gun. The suit has also carried on different occasions a re-breather device, flash and gas grenades, explosives and a detonator, lockpicks, a signaling device for the Batmobile, electronic surveillance equipment (including video camera and monitor), a forensic kit for gathering crime scene evidence, a medical kit, a small toolkit, a homing device, a cache of money and, in early incarnations, a pistol in a holster. On any occasion where Batman anticipates encountering Superman, he has also carried (in a lead case) a kryptonite ring given to him by Superman himself as a weapon of last resort.

In The Batman, released in March 2022, the bat symbol on Batman's chest is bladed, allowing it to serve as both an emblem as well as a functional tool and weapon. To be more plausible, the bat symbol was made of metal instead of leather.

== Variants in publication ==
Batman keeps variant costumes for dealing with extraordinary situations; for example, he has been shown in a SCUBA variant of his costume, a fireproof version for fighting his enemy Firefly, a thermal insulated version for fighting Mr. Freeze, as well as others. Many versions of the hero, including those shown in Batman: The Dark Knight Returns, Kingdom Come, Batman Beyond and Batman Versus Predator, show him swapping his cloth costume for a suit of powered armor, either to cope with particularly physically powerful foes or to compensate for his own aging body. In the Batman Versus Predator series, Batman adopts a suit of armor to cope with serious physical injuries inflicted by the Predator in the first volume, and the third sees him using a new suit of armor designed to minimize his external body temperature to hide him from the Predator's infrared vision. However, in the second volume he merely uses a scrambler gauntlet to disrupt the Predator's cloaking device, openly stating that he prefers his usual stealth methods over the powerful but cumbersome armour.

=== Jean-Paul Valley ===
Jean-Paul Valley in his Batman armor. Art by the character's co-creator Joe Quesada.

In the Knightfall story arc (1993–1994), Jean-Paul Valley redesigned the Batsuit during his tenure as Batman. Rather than appearing as a new costume, Valley developed it over time. Valley created an armored suit that contained more gadgets, including a shuriken launcher, flamethrower and other, more lethal weapons. This version of the suit did away with the traditional cape and cowl, and essentially an amalgam of Bruce Wayne's costume and Valley's Azrael armor. It featured armored and bladed wings and was highly bulletproof, capable of sustaining direct machine gun barrages as well as enduring the explosions from grenades and high intensity fire. The suit also featured an underwater rebreather. A circular ammo feeder affixed to the back of the suit provided Valley with continuous bat-shaped shuriken. It was then made to be more high tech, with the eyes appearing more as goggles, different color scheme, and more armor. After being caught in an explosion during his fight with the former Batman at the time, Bruce Wayne, the main color scheme turns into red-and-gold; the same colors of Azrael's armor. While the suit bears immense power, it also slows its user's speed and limits movement capacity.

In the end, the suit became Valley's vulnerable point, as Bruce realized that his replacement had become too reliant upon the suit's gadgetry. In their final confrontation, Bruce, in his traditional bat costume, tricked Valley into discarding the armor. Valley's gauntlets were later used by Kate Spencer.

=== Dick Grayson ===
In Batman: Prodigal after Bruce steps down as Batman after his recovery from his attack from Bane and the defeat of Jean-Paul Valley, Dick takes over the role of Batman and wears an exact duplicate of Bruce's Batsuit that fits his size.

Rejected concept art by Tony Daniel showcased an outfit that was visually similar to the costume of Earth-Two's Dick Grayson. Another concept sketch by Frank Quitely depicted a plated design that heavily resembled the Batsuit worn by Bruce Wayne in the film The Dark Knight.

=== Troika ===
Batman's alternate costume in "Troika". Art by Graham Nolan.

Though Batman rejects Jean-Paul Valley's armor, he agrees that it is time to update his own Batsuit. While no different in terms of gadgets, the Batsuit that Batman wears, first in the Troika storyline, is noticeably not navy blue and grey like his last costume, looking very similar to the suits worn in the film Batman (1989) and its sequel, Batman Returns. The costume is also much sturdier than his previous costumes, as it is made of Kevlar and Nomex. Batman designs it with his encounter with Bane and his experiences with his rogues' gallery after the mass breakout at Arkham Asylum in mind and thus is a prototype for additional protection against critical physical injuries such as spinal trauma, along with standard firearms and intense heat, in addition to countering his rogues' tactics. It is not, however, able to withstand armor-piercing shells. Its matte black color scheme camouflages Batman against the city's environment at night. The gauntlets and boots for this Batsuit are also one-piece, seamlessly connected to the arms and legs. Later, Batman replaces the original gloves and boots with more protective ones, citing his encounter with the Russian Troika. Next, artists (such as Phil Jimenez) have drawn Batman's cape recreating Valley's costume's silhouette throughout the 1990s, despite nothing stating that Batman attempted to strike fear into the city's element based on the reputation accrued from Valley's tenure, mainly for their preferences, styles, and attempts to make Batman look intimidating due to Valley's costume's fearsome visage. Later in No Man's Land, Batman replaces the utility belt, which uses capsules, with one with the standard military-style pouches.

=== Batman, Inc. ===
Batman's suit when starting Batman Inc. Art by David Finch.

After Bruce Wayne returns from his journey through time, he designs another Batsuit that differentiates from Dick Grayson's (concept drawings by artist David Finch) and adds further upgrades. It is notably similar to the Troika outfit, but it is an amalgam of Batman's previous costumes including that suit, for him to utilize some of their advantages with modifications, including a full set of electronics, including a heating and cooling system, secure broadband communications, and can emit an electromagnetic pulse, which disrupts electronic devices around him (such as rooftop security cameras). For combat efficiency, Batman added projectiles on the gauntlets to incapacitate opponents, and retractable knives on the boots' soles.

The shield is not just a bat-themed insignia adorned on the chest area. It can be used as a wide-beam flashlight and intimidating opponents, therefore could be "powered down to black or gray so that it camouflages itself when necessary."

== The New 52 ==
In September 2011, The New 52 rebooted DC's continuity. In this new timeline, Batman wore another version of the Batsuit designed by artist Cully Hamner. This Batsuit was made of hardened plates on titanium-dipped tri-weave fibers and was broken into multiple pieces of armor over a more flexible bodysuit for greater mobility. The gloves were made of a dense but malleable leather with ribbing on the palm side of the fingers, raised piping, and convex metal knuckles on the topside. Mesh detail appeared just beneath the palm and inside the three recessed louver-like shapes located on both topside. The blades on the sides of Batman's gauntlets were retractable and capable of firing outward projectiles. The utility belt was a convex metal ampules form, and its buckle was made of beveled metal platelets. The back of the belt had an intricate containment device and could be detached to be used as a tool. Batman also adapted a para-cape that aerodynamically supported himself for gliding.

=== Justice Buster ===
When the Joker used a variation on his Joker toxin to turn the Justice League against Batman in Batman: Endgame, Batman fought against them using a suit of armor described (by the Joker-like Superman) as the "Justice Buster" suit, created specifically for Batman to wage war against the most powerful beings on the planet. It allegedly cost more to create the suit than sixty percent of the world's nations put into their respective militaries, with a sizable portion of that budget going towards giving the suit the processing power necessary for it to outpace the Flash and anticipate where he would run so that it could immobilize him. Its armory includes an artifact called the "Bind of Veils", which is an inverted version of the Lasso of Truth that took Batman two years to acquire on the supernatural black market; contact with it traps Wonder Woman in a dream causing her to think she has killed Batman. More conventional weapons in the suit's arsenal include a foam-gun that sprayed powered magnesium carbonate to trap and drain Aquaman of all moisture, an electromagnetic nerve tree to stop Cyborg, a citrine neurotoxin for Green Lantern, plasma shields to deflect heat vision, dwarf red suns in the gauntlets to weaken Superman, and a small pellet of kryptonite gum if Superman got past the suit. Despite the amount of time he put into creating the suit, Batman acknowledges that it would never be able to stop Superman if he was genuinely trying to kill Batman, only winning the fight with the Joker-like Superman through the use of the kryptonite gum.

=== James Gordon ===
When James Gordon is 'promoted' to become a GCPD-sponsored Batman after the disappearance of the original, he wore two variations of the Batsuit, designed by the Powers Corporation. When he was in the field, he commonly wore a large high-tech suit of armor that included shoulder-mounted weapons, a large handheld gun, various electromagnetic generators, full-spectrum visual capabilities, and large bat-like wings to act as a bomb shield and refine its 'flight' mode – although this was commonly used when falling from the GCPD 'Bat-Blimp' rather than full solo flight – composed of nano-carbons that could even change color if the user wanted. When inside buildings, he wore a simple all-black bodysuit with a yellow bat outline on his chest while carrying a gun on a basic utility belt, lacking the usual cape, although the suit possessed a personal cloaking device that could turn Gordon totally invisible and was made of a material that could withstand the temperature of an incinerator long enough for Gordon to break out. When Gordon was acting alone, the robot Batsuit could run a 'nimble auto program' that would allow Gordon's home base to set a target and allow the suit to calculate how to reach that target, using basic contextual materials to act on its own accord. The suit proved powerful as a combat asset, and Powers Corp had plans to create a whole series of suits to be put into action across the country, but after the original sustained serious damage in battle with new villain Mr Bloom, who proceeded to take over all the other suits via remote control just before the original Batman returned, Gordon stepped back and returned to his role as Commissioner as Powers Corp abandoned the Batman program due to public loss of confidence, feeling that only the true Dark Knight could be Batman.

== DC Rebirth ==
Greg Capullo's original DC Rebirth design sketch and to the right a comic panel penciled by Mikel Janín and colored by June Chung.

In the 2016 DC Comics relaunch, DC Rebirth, Batman's latest suit is similar to the New 52 suit but with two major distinctions the bat across his chest is now outlined with an orange/dark gold color and the interior of the cape is purple, which instantly sets it apart from every other costume that came before. The gauntlets and boots are still armored, but the utility belt is now black with colored outlining to match the chest emblem. Greg Capullo created the original design sketch for the Rebirth Batsuit which indicates the cape, cowl boots and cloves are jet black. Whether the black parts of the costume come off as black or navy blue seems to depend on the colorist of any given story.

== Elseworlds ==
In The Dark Knight Returns, Batman initially goes into action wearing the standard Batsuit, but he dons a suit of powered armour when facing Superman. Features of this suit include an ultrasonic gun- along with sonic dampeners to prevent Batman being damaged by the same weapon- and the ability to plug directly into Gotham's power grid by connecting the suit to a lamp in Crime Alley. When plugged into the power grid, the suit was powerful enough to do some damage to Superman in a fight, but this required Batman to confront Superman at night after he had been hit with various other weapons, such as missiles from the Batmobile and an arrow of synthetic kryptonite. Three years later (The Dark Knight Strikes Again), Batman has returned to his original suit with a completely black cape and cowl, the cape's edges being so sharp that he is able to use them to carve a 'Z' onto Lex Luthor's face. During his initial rematch with Superman, after the Man of Steel had been worn down by various other attacks, Batman beat Superman into submission with a large pair of Kryptonian gauntlets.

In Batman: In Darkest Knight, where Bruce Wayne is chosen as the Green Lantern instead of Hal Jordan, he mostly wears the standard Green Lantern uniform, but his attire includes a cape and cowl similar to what he would wear as Batman, although it lacks the "bat ears" of the traditional cowl.

In Batman: Holy Terror, Bruce Wayne's costume is specifically stated as having originally been worn by his father when he portrayed a demon in a play. The general look is still the same as Batman's familiar attire, but the belt is almost triangular in design, the 'ears' on the cowl are wider without being a simple single point, and the bat-like symbol on the chest is more triangular, with a white patch at the top leading to a thin white line directly over the throat under the chin, possibly a reference to Bruce Wayne's civilian role as a priest.

In Robin 3000, the Batman of this time period wears an outfit similar to the standard batsuit; the only clear difference is an artificial left eye, similar in design to Deadshot's familiar cybernetic substitute.

In Batman/Houdini: The Devil's Workshop, most of Batman's attire is concealed under a long thick coat, the exact costume not entirely visible in the dark of the night, although his cowl is the familiar style apart from notably thinner 'ears' than usual.

In Batman: Dark Knight of the Round Table, after Bruce of Waynesmoor has spent years living in Avalon before being trained by Merlin, he is granted a suit of armour that Merlin describes as having been forged by the power of the dragon, the metals forged by the dragon's fiery breath before being cooled in its blood, granting the wearer control over the forces of nature itself. While wearing this armour, Bruce also used his father's old sword.

In Batman: Gotham by Gaslight and its sequel, the Batman outfit is presented with buccaneer-style gloves and boots and a floor-length cape with an upturned collar, along with a simple cloth cowl. The utility belt is shown with two short daggers and various pouches with unidentified contents.

In Batman: Castle of the Bat, depicting Bruce Wayne as a Frankenstein-esque doctor while the Bat-Man is his reanimated father, the Bat-Man's initial attire is intended to aid in his father's altered awareness of his new senses and mask some of the necessary scarring, with the familiar cowl accompanied by a short cloak around the shoulders and upper arms. As the Bat-Man 'evolves,' he discards the cowl and his head becomes bat-like.

In Kingdom Come and its sequel The Kingdom, an older Bruce wears a bracing powered exoskeleton due to his long career as Batman putting his body under serious strain, and then a complete armor when in action as Batman. Comic book artist Alex Ross drew inspiration from RoboCop when designing the armor.

In the Vampire Batman trilogy, Batman wears the familiar Batsuit even after he becomes a vampire. However, he wields silver batarangs in the first novel in the trilogy in his final confrontation with Dracula and, in the second novel, uses cross-shaped throwing daggers made of wood with silver in the interior; these weapons are specifically designed to help him kill the other vampires. After his surrender to his vampire side and several months decaying in a coffin, Batman occasionally transforms into a twisted giant bat form when flying and hunting his enemies, but he retains the usual suit in his human form.

In Batman: Brotherhood of the Bat, some years after Bruce Wayne's death and humanity's decimation by a virus unleashed by Ra's al Ghul, Ra's takes control of the Batcave and uses some of Bruce's sketches of possible costumes to create an army of Bat-men based on Bruce's rejected costume designs. These costumes reflect darker or more heavily armoured styles that Bruce considered using before he decided to go with a simple design that could be adapted for multiple situations, feeling that others suffered such problems as impractically large capes, excess padding providing enhanced protection at the cost of mobility, or looking too demonic for his goal of becoming part of the darkness without appearing too intimidating for the people he was trying to protect. Later in the storyline, Talia is able to direct her son, Tallant, to oppose his grandfather, with Tallant donning his father's own Batsuit to infiltrate Ra's's plans and destroy his grandfather's army.

In Elseworld's Finest—retelling the origins of Superman and Batman in the style of pulp fiction narratives in the 1930s—Bruce Wayne is a former playboy turned impoverished archaeologist. During a confrontation with Ra's al Ghul's men on a quest for the lost city of Argos, Wayne is badly injured by a poisoned sword, but is confronted by the spirit of the ancient warrior-wizard Kha. who offers Bruce life and himself redemption if Bruce will take on his mantle. Kha's armour consists of a black bodysuit with golden gauntlets and boots, as well as a golden necklace in the style of a bat and a golden helm that resembles a twisted bat.

In League of Justice, depicting DC heroes in a fairy-tale realm, the 'Bat-Mancer' goes into action wearing armour underneath the head and wings of a giant bat.

In Superman: Speeding Bullets, depicting a world where Kal-El was taken in by the Waynes and raised as Bruce, he initially goes into action wearing what appears to be the standard Batsuit, albeit with the mouth covered as well and visible padding around the edges of the arms and legs. After Lois Lane convinces him that he would have more power as a symbol in the daylight, he adopts a new Superman-style costume, albeit without the red 'trunks' and with headgear that encircles his ears and chin while leaving his face exposed.

In Elseworld's Finest: Supergirl & Batgirl, where Barbara Gordon is Batgirl after her father was killed saving the Waynes and Bruce is essentially her Alfred rather than Batman, she initially wore the standard Batgirl costume from the comics. By the time of the storyline, she has adopted a darker costume, including metallic gauntlets on her forearms and wrists, shoulders, and exterior ankles, with the main suit consisting of nanites extending out from the belt to cover her body.

In Batman: Dark Knight Dynasty, Bruce Wayne's distant ancestor Joshua initially acts as a member of the Knights Templar, but when faced with a raid on Vandal Savage's compound after the rest of his group have been slain by Savage's minions, he dons his old family armour, which includes a bat-like crest and a helmet in the style of the usual Bat-cowl, including small points and a visor that shields his eyes, although his equipment consists only of a sword and a short iron knife. In the present day, after Savage kills his parents on his wedding night, Bruce adopts the familiar Batman costume to hunt their killer, later adapting it into a spacesuit with its own air supply and the cowl now an actual helmet when he confronts Vandal on a space shuttle. In the twenty-fifth century, Brenna Wayne devises three bat-themed costumes to track the source of the conspiracy against her family, with two being high-tech black-and-orange suits with such advanced weaponry as flamethrowers in the cape/wings, and the third a simpler black suit with gold trim.

In Superman & Batman: Generations, depicting Superman and Batman 'aging' in real-time from their debuts in 1939 onwards, Bruce Wayne is shown wearing the standard Batsuit of each era, including wearing a Robin outfit in a story set in 1929 and wearing a fox-mask with an orange cape and purple shirt during an adventure when he was a child in 1919. Dick Grayson takes on the role of Batman between 1959 and 1969, again wearing a Batsuit similar to what was worn in the comics at this time, with this suit being worn by Bruce's son, Bruce Wayne Junior, when he takes over as Batman in 1969 after Grayson is killed by a trap set by the Joker, Bruce Junior switching costumes with Grayson to create the illusion that the Joker killed Robin rather than Batman. Between 1979 and 1986, after the death of his wife on their wedding day, Bruce Junior adopts an armoured Batsuit with a covered facial mask as his new costume. He wears this costume until 1999, when he rediscovers his long-missing father- Bruce Wayne having become immortal and young in 1979 after a confrontation with Ra's al Ghul- with Bruce adopting a new Batsuit in darker colours after his return to the role.

== In other media ==
=== Animation ===
==== Filmation and Hanna-Barbera ====
In the various superhero animated series produced by Filmation and Hanna-Barbera, including The Adventures of Batman (1968–1977), Super Friends (1973–1986) and The New Adventures of Batman (1977), Batman has been consistently depicted with the blue and gray Batsuit of the Silver Age comics from the 1950s and 1960s, with the chest emblem and utility belt from the "New Look" version.

==== DC animated universe ====
Batman's various costumes in animated adaptations.

Batman wears various Batsuits throughout the DC Animated Universe (DCAU):

Batman: The Animated Series

The Batsuit in Batman: The Animated Series (1992–1995) features a chest emblem and utility belt similar to the "New Look" version, and the emblem's design itself typically resembles the yellow-ellipsed bat symbol that was used in comics from the early 1970s through the late 1990s, but the cape and cowl noticeably feature Bob Kane and Bill Finger's original color scheme of black with blue highlights. This design was re-used in the feature films Batman: Mask of the Phantasm (1993) and Batman & Mr. Freeze: SubZero (1998).

The New Batman Adventures

Batman's physical appearance was revamped in The New Batman Adventures (1997–1999) with his second major Batsuit's colors darker overall and the utility belt here uses light brown pouches. His gloves also have extended scallops and retractable claws, and his chest emblem was changed into a complete bat without the yellow ellipse. There were fewer highlights on the cape and cowl that were now dark gray and the cape itself was redesigned to always reach over his shoulders, even when it is not covering his entire body below the head and the tights were also changed to a dark gray. This suit is equipped with a parachute in preparation of Batman is unable to use his grapnel when falling. This design was re-used in the crossovers with Superman: The Animated Series and Static Shock, as well as the feature film Batman: Mystery of the Batwoman (2003) and the flashback sequence in Batman Beyond: Return of the Joker (2000).

Justice League and Justice League Unlimited

Batman was again redesigned in Justice League (2001–2004) with his third major Batsuit as a mixture appearance of the previous two designs; the costume itself is the same one from The New Batman Adventures, but has the original color scheme from Batman: The Animated Series. Additionally, the artists added certain modifications to foreshadow the futuristic costume from Batman Beyond such as the lengthening of the "ears" on the cowl and the addition of heels on the boots.

This design was re-used in the Static Shock two-part episode "A League of Their Own", as well as the follow-up series, Justice League Unlimited (2004–2006). It was eventually re-used again for the feature film Justice League vs. the Fatal Five (2019).

Batman Beyond

An extremely different variant of the Batsuit is featured in Batman Beyond (1999–2001) which does away with the traditional individual articles of clothing and appears to be a simple black bodysuit with a bright red chest emblem and the cowl also covers the entire face: however, this version is a form-fitting "power suit" with cutting-edge technology. New additions to the belt include capsules that release fire-extinguishing agents when Batman throws them, and a retractable, whirling blade for cutting. Designed by Bruce Wayne twenty years before the series began, this fourth major Batsuit was built to compensate for his aging body and failing health. However, the suit strained his weak heart during use and proved insufficient for his physical limitations. After Bruce retired, Terry McGinnis ultimately became its primary wearer. Terry McGinnis ultimately inherited the suit after Bruce Wayne's retirement. Engineered to support Bruce’s aging body, this advanced Batsuit featured built-in countermeasures from his past battles, perfectly equipping Terry to face Neo-Gotham's rogues gallery. It amplifies Terry's strength and agility and is equipped with built-in gadgets, most prominently retractable glider wings and jet boots which together allow for limited flight, an active camouflage system which renders him nearly invisible, and a two-way radio and video link system that allows Bruce to see and hear everything Terry does and give advice and communicate. A kill switch is also present on the Batcomputer, allowing Bruce to shut it down remotely in emergencies or other necessary situations.

Other DCAU costumes

Flashbacks from the Batman: The Animated Series episodes "Robin's Reckoning" and "The Mechanic" as well as Batman: Mask of the Phantasm (1993) show Batman's earliest costume that (according to the reference book Batman Animated) was based on the Batsuit from Batman: Year One with elements from Bob Kane's original Batsuit (which was also similar to how his basic costume would be designed in all further subsequent DCAU appearances). Batman also has an alternative suit of black armor in The New Batman Adventures episode "Torch Song" capable to withstand extreme heat and flame (such as Firefly's attacks) due to platings similar to ceramic matrix composite (CMC) and expanded graphite. During the alternative timeline created by Vandal Savage's disruptions of World War II in the Justice League episode "The Savage Time", Batman's Batsuit has rigid armor and a visor that covers his eyes. Another alternative-universe version of the Batsuit worn by the Justice Lords incarnation of Batman in the Justice League episode "A Better World" featured lighter gray colors on the cape, cowl and chest, and jet black on the rest of the bodysuit, seemingly inspired by the Phantasm costume worn by Andrea Beaumont.

==== The Batman ====
In The Batman (2004–2008), the Batsuit looks very similar to the costume from Batman: The Animated Series, but has shorter 'ears' on the cowl to make the Batman look more like a "boxer", claws on the fingertips of the gloves, a slightly redesigned yellow-ellipse bat emblem on his chest, a more high-tech computerized utility belt linking to the Batcave's computer system called the "Batwave"; The belt's buckle can be removed and used for several purposes, such as for a tracking device, for controlling the Batmobile, the Batbot, or fly remote-controlled batarangs. It also has a longer cape that, just like the DCAU costumes, sometimes covers his entire body below the head. In addition, Batman uses some other variations of the Batsuit as well in the series to tackle certain situations and villains.

- In the episode "Traction", the Batman is badly injured by Bane, due to which he is forced to build a prototype exo-skeleton called the "Batbot" to battle the villain. The Batbot is controlled by Bruce Wayne while sitting inside its cockpit. It is shown to possess superhuman strength to match that of Bane, along with enhanced levels of agility and endurance. It has two turbo retro-thrusters for flight on its back as well. The Batbot is also shown to be controlled via the Batman's utility belt.
- In the episodes "The Big Chill" and "Fire and Ice", Batman uses a Batsuit specialized for cold environments that can withstand sub-zero temperatures and camouflage in snow. In addition, the Batsuit is equipped with retractable ice skates and two flamethrowers.
- In the episode "Swamped", Batman uses a waterproof Batsuit to battle Killer Croc.
- In the film The Batman vs. Dracula (2005), Batman upgrades his utility belt to carry anti-vampire weaponry.
- In the episode "White Heat", Batman uses a black NBC suit to combat Firefly after the latter's transformation into Phosphorus.
- In the episode "Artifacts", it is shown that, decades into the future, an elder Batman would adapt a simpler Batsuit resembling the Batsuit of Batman: The Dark Knight Returns.

==== Batman: Gotham Knight ====
In Batman: Gotham Knight (2008), a DC Universe Animated Original Movie set between Batman Begins and The Dark Knight, details of the Batsuit are shown. The suit has many characteristics of the Batman Begins suit, but in the segment "Field Test", Batman upgrades the suit with an advanced motion scanner that has an electromagnetic gyro attached, which produces a magnetic shield capable of deflecting small-arms fire. He uses this for a short time before abandoning it, due to the danger to bystanders. During "In Darkness Dwells", it is shown that there is an infrared scope built within the cowl, along with a rebreather that can be folded within it. In addition, there is a wireless relay communicator built in the cowl.

==== Batman: The Brave and the Bold ====
In Batman: The Brave and the Bold (2008–2011), Batman wears a slightly modified version of the blue and gray suit worn during the Silver Age comics from the 1960s and 1970s. The Batsuit also resembles the "New Look" costume. According to the show's creators, this was deliberately done to invoke a less dark and violent depiction of Batman following the release of The Dark Knight. Though similar in appearance to the older costumes, this Batsuit has a much larger amount of gadgetry than any other costume shown to date.

==== Young Justice ====
The Batsuit worn by Batman in Young Justice (2010–2013) is largely similar to the ones seen in The New Batman Adventures, Justice League, and Justice League Unlimited, as well as the comic books prior to Batman Incorporated. The only major visual difference stems from the detailing on the suit, which highlights the padding and armored plates, in contrast to the more minimalist take drawn by Bruce Timm and other artists.

==== Beware the Batman ====
Taking advantage of the computer generated imagery used to create the show, the Batsuit worn in Beware the Batman is more detailed than previous versions. Like the suits seen in most of the live-action films, the new Batsuit is entirely black and sports a raised bat-emblem on the chest without the yellow-ellipse, as well as a more helmet-like cowl, and it is very similar to the outfits from The New Batman Adventures, Justice League and Justice League Unlimited. The suit's utility belt was also redesigned for the show, and an actual model was built by Glen Murakami in order to make it as realistic and practical as possible.

==== The Lego Movie ====
In The Lego Movie (2014), the Batsuit Batman wears resembles the one from Tim Burton's live action movies as well as the Batman comics from the 1990s.

==== The Lego Batman Movie ====
In The Lego Batman Movie (2017), Batman wears the same Batsuit from the previous movie but now has a new belt piece and has glowing eyes like they did in Dawn of Justice. Batman also owns hundreds of types of Batsuits such as the ones seen from his first appearance in the comics, the 1960s version, the armored version from Dawn of Justice, the 1943 serial and Batman Beyond. Other Batsuits are briefly seen such as Suba Bat, Glam Bat, Regge Man (which becomes the Robin costume), Nightwing, Com-Bat, St Batricks, etc.

==== Batman: The Killing Joke ====
In Batman: The Killing Joke (2016), Batman's Batsuit resembles the one used in Batman: Year One and its comic counterpart.

==== Batwheels: The Series ====
In the preschool animated series, Batwheels, Batman's Batsuit is black and dark gray, and is very body armor-like, with the yellow-ellipse bat emblem on his chest; much like the character’s bulkier build in this series, the suit is also very resemblant to his appearance from The Dark Knight Returns, as well as Ben Affleck's portrayal of the character in the live-action DC Extended Universe films.

=== Live-action ===
==== 1940s movie serials ====
The movie serials of the 1940s featured a black and gray version of the Batsuit and it resembles the one from the early Batman comics.

==== 1960s TV series ====
The Batsuit of the 1960s Batman TV show, worn by Adam West

The live-action Batman television series of the 1960s, starring Adam West, featured a blue-purple and gray version of the Batsuit with the cape shortened (to avoid West and stunt doubles getting tripped up) and smaller ears on the cowl (for closer shots during filming). There were also light blue eyebrows painted on the navy blue face plate, along with a light blue-line on the nose. The rest of the cowl was blue satin fabric that would turn purple after hours of filming under the hot studio lights.

==== 1989–1997 film series ====
Batman (1989 film)

Tim Burton's Batman films feature a matte-black Batsuit with the yellow-ellipsed bat emblem, brass utility belt, and heavy armor placed on the chest, forearms and boots, with the chest plate sculpted to look like a well developed upper body. This becomes the basic template on which all subsequent live-action Batsuits are based. On several occasions in the live-action films, Bruce Wayne's appearance in this Batsuit template has been likened to that of "a giant bat", especially when his cape is spread wide in front of terrified criminals.

The Batsuit of the 1989 Batman film, worn by Michael Keaton

In Batman (1989), the basic design of the suit, by Bob Ringwood, is essentially the Neal Adams version of the costume, which was still in vogue in the comics during the 1980s. This movie suit was notable for its introduction of the grapple gun with a motorized reel (which was later adopted by the comics), for the black eye makeup worn under the mask (which has been used in every live-action Batman film since), and for the construction of the cowl (which made it nearly impossible for Michael Keaton to turn his head while wearing it). The costume was constructed of black kevlar-like material over metal plating (layers of foam-latex over a Neoprene bodysuit in reality, hi-tech body armor in the context of the film), instead of the light-gray spandex seen in the comics and in the 1966 live-action Batman television series. Keaton was told not to put on too much muscle in preparation for the role, as there was uncertainty to how it would effect the costume they were sculpting on bodycasts made during the filming of The Dream Team. Keaton's lean build proved helpful when adding layers of armor to his silhouette with the bodysuit.

Batman Returns

In Batman Returns (1992), Bruce is seen choosing his Batsuit and accessories out of many spares from a large walk-in closet carved into a wall of the Batcave. The suit used in this film differs slightly from the previous version, being that it was made out of a thinner, slightly more flexible foam latex material and featured more angular shapes in its representation of anatomy. The overall design of the suit was meant to reminiscent of art deco and industrial design like the rest of his retro-futuristic gadgetry. It also features a chest emblem more similar to a traditional bat symbol seen in the comics and in Batman: The Animated Series, than the previous film's costume. At one point in the film, Batman's cape is shown to be able to change, through use of a fold-out spring-loaded framework, into a glider that allows him to glide through the sky. Christopher Nolan would use a similar approach with the cape in his Batman films. Michael Keaton insisted on making the costume's groin area easily allow him to urinate between takes, which resulted in new seam lines running down the leg and a groin flap hiding a zipper on the slacks.

Batman Forever

Joel Schumacher's Batman films are known for their addition of rubber nipples to the Batman and Robin costumes (on the DVD commentary, Schumacher claimed they were inspired by statues of the Greek gods), though they are noticeably absent from the secondary suits Batman wears during the climaxes of both films.

In Batman Forever (1995), the Batsuit is similar to the previous two films' costumes, except for the focus on a more anatomical design overall and a black utility belt instead of a yellow one. The "ears" on the cowl are also longer. One notable feature of the costume is a button on the utility belt which causes a fireproof coating to excrete from and cover the cape, allowing Batman to wrap it around himself as a shield from extreme fires, and a more 3-D bat emblem on his chest, but resembles the chest symbol from Batman Returns. Also like in Batman Returns, Bruce has numerous spares which he keeps in a large dome-like structure in the Batcave of this film. Dr. Chase Meridian, the film's love interest for Batman, mentions the appeal of Batman's suit as she runs her fingers across the chest section. After all of the regular Batsuits are destroyed by the Riddler, Bruce wears a prototype "Sonar Suit", which is an iridescent silvery-black and more armor-like. This new Batsuit utilizes lenses that slide automatically over the cowl's eyeholes to display a sonar-generated image of Batman's surroundings to him, allowing him to see with more accuracy in extreme darkness or glare. The use of this suit in the climax of the film, allows Batman to smash the Riddler's Box-device and save both Robin and Dr Meridian, which otherwise would have been impossible with the standard Batsuit. The Batsuits in this film were created from a less dense mixture of foam rubber, which resulted in much lighter suits and allowed more flexibility for Val Kilmer and the various stunt doubles, while increasing durability. More than 100 Batman and Robin costumes were created to allow for the range of stunts, from underwater scenes to scenes involving fire and extreme fighting. The "sonar" Batsuit was subsequently used by Christopher Nolan when auditioning actors for the lead role in Batman Begins, and was worn by Christian Bale and Cillian Murphy among others.

Batman & Robin

In Batman & Robin (1997), Batman produces a bat-credit card from his utility belt which has an expiration date of "Forever". This film also added pop-out ice skates to the costume's boots. The basic Batsuit of this film is also noticeably more blue than black in color tone, including the ellipse around the bat symbol instead of the yellow ellipsed bat symbol from the last three films. A second, more elaborately detailed costume (a silvery Arctic version) is worn by "Batman" during the film's climax against Mr. Freeze, which is identical to the prototype "Sonar Suit" from Batman Forever, but in blue with silver accents. As in Batman Forever, the basic Batsuit of this film also features nipples and an enlarged codpiece. While Bruce is giving Alfred his medicine, he wears the same prototype "Sonar Suit" from Batman Forever, minus the cowl and gloves.

==== The Dark Knight Trilogy (2005–2012) ====
Batman Begins

The Batsuit in the reboot Batman Begins (2005) is given the most complete description ever seen in a Batman film and the comic books. Derived from the Research and Development Program within Wayne Enterprises' Applied Sciences Division, the suit is described by Lucius Fox as a Nomex survival suit originally intended for advanced military use but was considered to be too expensive for the United States Army and military in general. Based on an advanced infantry armor system constructed from Nomex, the first layer of protection is an undersuit with built-in temperature regulators designed to keep the wearer at a comfortable temperature in almost any condition. The second layer of protection consists of armor built over the chest, calves, thighs, arms and back. This armor features a kevlar bi-weave that can stop slashing weapons and can also deflect any bullet short of a straight shot impact, and reinforced joints that supposedly allow maximum flexibility and mobility, which Batman finds still hinders his movements due to its weight. The armor is then coated with a matte-black latex material for camouflage and to dampen Bruce's heat signature, making him difficult to detect with night-vision equipment. Made of a graphite material, the cowl acts as a protective helmet. The cowl's Kevlar lining is supposed to be bulletproof. A manufacturing defect in the graphite used in the production of the first shipment of the cowl's components made its outer shell incapable of withstanding blunt trauma (a flaw Alfred demonstrates to Bruce using a baseball bat). The second shipment (not shown) was supposed to fix this problem. An advanced eavesdropping device is concealed within the cowl's right ear and enables Batman to listen in on conversations from a distance.

The utility belt is a modified climbing harness in bronze with the chest and shoulder straps removed for ease of movement. It features magnetized impact-resistant pouches and canisters attached to the belt at ergonomic points for ease of reach. It carries a magnetic gas-powered grapple gun, an encrypted cell phone, bat-shaped shuriken, a medical kit, smoke bombs, mini explosives, periscope, remote control for the Tumbler, mini-cam, money and other unspecified equipment.

Batman's cape is made of "memory cloth" also developed by Fox. It is essentially flexible in its normal state, but becomes semi-rigid in a fixed form (Batman's wings) when an electric current is passed through it from the microcircuits in the palms of his gloves.

Bruce also adds metal gauntlets with scallops on the forearms, an innovation derived from his experience as a pupil of Ra's al Ghul's League of Shadows. Mainly used to block against knives or other stabbing weapons, Bruce managed to surprise Ra's by breaking the blade of his ninjatō in multiple places with the gauntlets.

The left boot heel contains a high-frequency sonic "sounder" which can summon bats (first seen in Batman: Year One).

Prior to the latest upgrade to the Batsuit in the next film, Batman still uses the original less flexible Nomex-based suit. Interrupting a drug transaction between Scarecrow and Chechen, he uses a pneumatic mangler that allows him to bend a gun barrel and tear through the sheet metal of a van while chasing after Scarecrow.

The Dark Knight

Batman's Batsuit is changed in The Dark Knight (2008) due to Bruce Wayne's growing frustration over his overall lack of mobility (leading to an incident where he gets mauled by Rottweilers while breaking up a drug deal). In this new design, the bodysuit is made of hardened kevlar plates on titanium-dipped tri-weave fibers and is broken into multiple pieces of armor over a more flexible bodysuit for greater mobility. But as a trade-off, the flexible armor leaves Batman more vulnerable to injury from knives and gunfire in favor of increased flexibility and lighter weight. While the cowl of the Batsuit in previous film incarnations has been attached to the shoulder and neck, the Batsuit's cowl is now a separate component inspired by the design of motorcycle helmets, allowing the wearer to freely swivel and move his neck without moving the rest of his upper torso (by Bruce's personal request to Fox as 'it would make backing out of the driveway easier') as was characteristic in all the previous cinematic versions of the Batsuit. Also, a strong electric current runs through it that prevents anyone except Batman from removing it, to further protect his identity.

In this Batsuit, the blades on the sides of Batman's gauntlets are now retractable and are capable of firing outwards as projectiles. The bat emblem is smaller than the previous one and it bears a greater resemblance to the Batman logo that has been associated with Nolan's films.

The suit again has an external 'memory cloth' cape, but, now has the ability to fold into a backpack shape as seen during the scene in which Batman performs a base-jump off a Hong Kong skyscraper. It was not made clear whether it can fold back into the backpack shape automatically after being used in glider mode. According to costume designer Linda Hemming, Nolan requested this design as a contingency in the event that the cape got caught up in the rear wheel of the Batpod while in motion.

The Batsuit also has "sonar-vision", where signals emitted by mobile phones are converted into images in a similar way to echolocation, in which bats use sound to see. In order to view the images, lenses fold down from Batman's cowl to cover his eyes. Aesthetically this gives Batman, for the first time on film, the "white-eyed" appearance he is always depicted within the comic books and various animated films/TV series.

The Dark Knight Rises

This exact same costume is re-used in The Dark Knight Rises (2012). Batman initially also makes use of a motorized brace to support his damaged knee after injuries he sustained in The Dark Knight. During Batman's first fight with Bane, the costume is initially damaged when Bane severely beats Batman and tears off part of the cowl after cracking the graphite. The rest of the costume is disposed of by Bane's henchmen after carrying off Bruce's badly injured body, as he is shown wearing ordinary rags when imprisoned in the Pit. After he escapes from the prison, Batman is able to acquire an identical Batsuit from the underground bunker.

==== DC Extended Universe ====
Batman v Superman: Dawn of Justice

Concept art of the Batman's exoskeleton in Batman v Superman: Dawn of Justice

Michael Wilkinson designed the costumes for Batman in Batman v Superman: Dawn of Justice (2016). It is influenced by the Batsuit seen in The Dark Knight Returns, and is noted by Bruce and Alfred to include additional armor to compensate for Bruce's greater age, as well as a device in the cowl to alter Bruce's voice when in the suit, both to make his voice impossible to identify as well as add an extra level of intimidation. The Batsuit is made of a Kevlar-titanium weave, is highly durable, making it resistant to knives and low-caliber firearms, the cowl and neck area of the suit consists of fabric-coated titanium alloy plating, protecting his neck and head from blade injuries and small-caliber firearms (a man using a knife could only cause sparks to fly when trying to stab Batman in the back of the neck). Not even bullets can pierce the suit at point-blank range, but some areas are somewhat vulnerable as a thug is successfully able to stab Batman with a knife in the upper arm. The cape also provided for gliding capabilities, although Batman rarely uses this, relying on the Grapple Gun instead. Unlike the Batsuits in the Tim Burton, Joel Schumacher and Christopher Nolan films this suit is black and grey as opposed to all-black or all-blue. An early scene in the film depicts Alfred conducting maintenance on a high-tech helmet with the leather mask laying next to it, implying that the Batsuit is worn overtop of armor. Multiple variants of the chest insignia were created, with the final design chosen because of the manner in which it emphasized Affleck's pectoral muscles.

A second Batsuit was unveiled at ComicCon 2014, and unlike the first which is made of cloth, it is armored and features illuminated white eyes. In the film, Batman's armor is a powered exoskeleton built by him and Alfred Pennyworth to counter Superman's strength as well as to protect Batman from Superman's attacks. It is also armed with a grenade launcher to fire kryptonite gas grenades and a kryptonite spear, both of which are necessary to weaken Superman to the point where Batman can fight him directly.

Suicide Squad

In Suicide Squad (2016), Bruce wore the Batsuit again twice in the film where he captured Deadshot and Harley Quinn.

Justice League

In Justice League (2017), the Batsuit has several additional pieces of armor, most notably on the arm and biceps. The cowl is more elongated, and the suit overall is lighter in texture. In the final battle at the climax, Bruce dons the Tactical Batsuit. This Batsuit consists of titanium armoured plates over a fireproof skin suit. The cowl also features small armoured plates on the ears, and Bruce also wears goggles, similar to Nite Owl from the Watchmen franchise.

Zack Snyder's Justice League (2021), a director's cut restoring the eponymous director's intended vision for the film, also features a reprisal of Batman's Knightmare outfit from Dawn of Justice during the film's epilogue sequence, which depicted another premonition of Wayne recruiting Joker into his insurgency opposed to the corrupted Superman. In addition, Bruce and Alfred add energy dissipating gauntlets to the primary suit, which are implied to have been inspired by Wonder Woman's metal bracelets.

==== The Batman franchise ====
In The Batman (2022), the Batsuit is worn during Bruce's second year in his campaign as Batman. Sporting a homemade aesthetic, the Batsuit has armor plating to protect against gunfire while retaining mobility, and his signature utility belt to house gadgets. Also, the insides of the Batsuit's gauntlets have built-in retractable grappling guns that Batman can use instantly and have inbuilt winches that can support his weight as they pull him upward. Additionally, the Bat symbol on his chest is detachable and can be used as a blade, sharp enough to cut a high-tension wire.

Batman's cowl is made of leather but its interior is reinforced to protect against blunt force trauma, explosions, and gunfire. Unlike previous Batsuits with the cowl and cape as one piece, the cowl is separate and allows for head and neck mobility. The cape is attached to a collar that wraps around the cowl and is shorter in length than the previous capes. The suit also contains a wire trigger that folds the cape into a wingsuit that allows Batman to glide, such as when he evades the police from the top of the Gotham PD building. Furthermore, the suit contains a small slot for injecting adrenaline into his body, as shown when he uses it to get up and tackle the thug trying to strangle Selina Kyle, after being knocked down by a shotgun to the chest at close range.

When Bruce is undercover during most of the film, he appears to store his gloves and gauntlets, cowl, and cape inside his backpack, while wearing a hoodie with a ball cap as well as a mask covering the lower half of his face, and a helmet for when he is riding his bike, though he abandons these at the end of the film in favor of his regular Batsuit.

Aside from his grappling guns and wingsuit, Batman's other gadgets feature electric discharge gloves that Batman can use to incapacitate enemies, small charges that allow him to blow up objects or structures, and contact lenses that he wears that record video for analysis as well as live streaming for the Batcave. The contacts also allow for Batman's detective vision which enables him to use facial recognition to find people, though it takes time. Batman also carries a laptop in a protective case he keeps in the Batmobile, possibly containing other crimefighting gadgets.

In a first for live-action portrayals of Batman, the black eye makeup that most Batman actors have used behind the scenes when wearing their cowls is featured prominently in the film as a plot device, showing Bruce actually applying the makeup before putting on the cowl, as well as keep the eyeliner on even when he has removed his cowl.

==== Gotham TV series ====
In this prequel series Bruce Wayne's transformation into Batman begins at the end of season 3, when he saves a nuclear family from the armed robber. His first "proto-Batsuit", shown in this episode, consists of black coat, black sweater, black gloves and simple robber-like black mask with triangle-shaped eyes.

At the start of season 4 Bruce uses the same suit, but with slightly different mask and a hood added to the coat. But at the end of this episode Lucius Fox represents Bruce a new bulletproof suit with a plastic mask, which looks like a cut-off facial part of Batman's cowl. Bruce continues to use this suit throughout this and next season, while Fox invents new gadgets for him to use in combat.

The only actual batsuit appeared in the final episode, based heavily on Christian Bale's suit, barring a rougher formed version of the cowl and 3D version of the Bat-symbol (similar to the costume from Batman Forever).

==== Titans ====
The Batsuit appears in the season finale of Titans, titled "Dick Grayson", in a dream world created by Trigon.

==== Batwoman ====
In the television series Batwoman, the Batsuit is shown in the Batcave at Wayne Tower and it was later used by Kate Kane as Batwoman. A key element in some later episodes focuses on the strength of the Batsuit, which is capable of enduring weapons fire from most standard weapons without any damage, to the extent that Bruce Wayne and Lucius Fox designed a gun specifically capable of penetrating the suit in the event of it being stolen. Fox's journal is an encoded book containing secrets, such as a fail-safe in the Batsuit that would kill the wearer. Season 1, Episode 19 "A Secret Kept From All the Rest" shows one excerpt which information that was copied from the Batsuit page on Wikipedia, with slight grammatical changes.

=== Video games ===
==== Batman: Arkham ====
Batman's armored costume unlocked for challenge mode in Batman: Arkham Asylum

In Batman: Arkham Asylum and its subsequent sequel Arkham City the Batsuit appears more akin to that of the cloth versions often seen in the comics. But underneath the aesthetic layer was a series of armor to protect against ballistic damage. Throughout the course of the games the suit takes on more and more progressive damage. The mask contains a "Detective Mode" visor to allow Batman to investigate crime scenes, see through walls, track enemies, collect data, navigate and locate signals. The gauntlets contain not only Batman's signature spiked blades but also a hardened mini computer and remote for his vehicles. His cape is similar to the one in the Nolanverse films which permits him to glide across vast distances. His utility belt contains an array of gadgets, some of which he builds or receives over the course of the games. The suit itself is also upgradable via perks the player can purchase throughout the games.

Utility Belt Arsenal

- Introduced in Arkham Asylum:
  - Grapple Gun - for ascension of buildings at high speeds, to boost gliding ability, disarming criminals from a distance and opening up heavy doors.
  - Line Launcher - Fires a parallel line in opposite directions to accelerate over distant obstacles or tightrope walk across silently.
  - Batarang - for disabling thugs, opening doors or destroying things, with sonic versions that distract and then disable enemies with high frequency sound and a remote-controlled version that can navigate around and through obstacles.
  - Cryptographic Sequencer - Computer and communicator allowing Batman to hack into various systems and open various electronically locked doors; in Arkham Knight, it is upgraded to a remote hacking device and can overtake drone controls and use digitally-controlled mechanisms to distract.
  - Explosive gel - Allows Batman to spray stable explosive and demolish obstacles and walls and destroy hazardous materials.
  - Smoke pellets - create a cloud of smoke when thrown to mask Batman's presence to sneak up on armed opponents or to escape dangerous situations.
- Introduced in Arkham City:
  - Freeze Grenades - disables thugs by freezing them in place or creating floating ice for Batman to safely navigate bodies of water; in the prequel Arkham Origins, this is initially a "glue grenade".
  - Disruptor - Disables mines, weapons crates, and various firearms; in the prequel Arkham Origins and the final sequel Batman: Arkham Knight, the disruptor takes the form of a gun and in the latter game can also make mines, weapons, and gadgetry backfire on the enemies using them.
  - Remote Electric Charge (REC) gun - shoots a burst of electricity that can shock people and power up generators.

In the prequel Arkham Origins the Batsuit takes on a more heavily protected armor look, more akin to the Nolan version in The Dark Knight: the ears are shorter and the cowl looks less like a mask and more like a combat helmet; and because of the added armor, only the cape gets progressively damaged, while the suit itself gets only scratched. Alfred constructs a concussion detonator (which attaches an orb of light that stuns enemies caught in the blast) for Batman, who also appropriates Deathstroke's remote claw gun (which fires a grappling claw that itself can shoot a grapple line to another object and pull it back to where it was fired) after defeating him; and after the death of Electrocutioner, Batman takes Electrocutioner's taser gloves, using them for the rest of the game. In the DLC content "Cold, Cold Heart", when facing Mister Freeze, Batman adopts a prototype Extreme Environment suit to cope with severe winter conditions. The suit adapts the taser gloves as Thermal Gloves to melt large quantities of ice, and is equipped with thermal batarangs that are heated to destroy icicles and other objects. The suit protects Batman from cold and cryo-vapor, and its honeycomb structure avoids any significant increase in weight despite its new bulk.

In the final sequel Arkham Knight the Batsuit takes on its most advanced and detailed look ever seen. The suit consists of two parts: a skintight MR fluid bodysuit with hard points made of titanium-dipped tri-weave (a la The Dark Knight), and armor plating more akin to that of an armored knight of Medieval Europe. The armor panels are highly articulated as seen in the trailer where Bruce is suiting up, and able to expand and contract with the form of the wearer—the chest armor is motorized and has high tensile wire to hold the pieces in place as he breathes and moves—giving the suit a far less bulky appearance than other previous versions and allowing it to compress around wounds caused by anything that gets past the armor's defenses. Arkham Knight also introduces to the utility belt arsenal the voice synthesizer, a gadget that allows Batman to digitally recreate the voice of someone else should that voice be needed to command enemies or digital systems.

The Arkham Knight wears a highly military-inspired Batsuit and an Arkham symbol on his chest. His mask is a helmet that not only conceals his identity but features a heads-up display to keep track of his troops and drones deployed throughout Gotham City. The mask also shows a map of Gotham City, seen on numerous occasions when he fights Batman. The ears on the mask serve two purposes, one to transmit commands to his troops and drones and second as psychological intimidation and mockery to the Batman. The Arkham Knight knows the influence of symbols and has adopted the Arkham Institution logo as his own in place of the bat emblem. He wears a red urban warfare style camouflage and a low slung utility belt akin to that of paratroopers. Beneath the cowl is another mask, known as a Tactical Visor.

==== Batman: The Telltale Series ====
The Batsuit (known as the "Batsuit Mark I") in the first season of Batman: The Telltale Series draws on comparisons from the suit in Arkham Origins. Built by Lucius Fox (along with all of Batman's tech), the cowl features short ears and the following functions: thermal vision, the ability to distort Batman's voice, a VR function for planned attacks and investigating crime scenes, and the ability to view reflected images, which comes in handy when a kidnapped Alfred adjusts his glasses to send images via a video Lady Arkham sends to Bruce Wayne in Episode 5. The gauntlets contain a 3D computer-like terminal whenever Batman needs to activate certain gadgets or his drones, and they allow him to scan evidence without ever touching anything; they also allow him to overhear conversations when he presses his fingers to a wall or window.

Towards the end of Episode 4, the player has the choice to oust Penguin as CEO of Wayne Enterprises and protect Batman's tech, or to oust Two-Face as mayor of Gotham and protect Wayne Manor from being burnt down. If they choose to take on Penguin and protect Batman's tech, Fox will give Wayne the Batsuit Mark II when he goes to rescue Alfred and face Lady Arkham. The Mark II's main body is light grey with an armored frame similar to the Exoframe Batsuit from The Dark Knight Returns, with the gloves (which feature no bracers), boots, cape, and cowl remaining all black. The cowl's ears are longer, and the yellow accents on the utility belt are predominant to show the suit's upgraded tech.

If the player takes on Two-Face at the cost of Batman's tech, the Mark I is rendered useless by a disruptor when Batman takes on the Children of Arkham in a hostage situation at the start of Episode 5. As a result, Wayne is forced to use a prototype Batsuit for the ending of the game. The suit is similar to the New 52 suit and is little more than a skin tight suit with basic cowl functions, which forces Batman to use basic detective skills to deduce where Alfred has been taken. The utility belt has fewer yellow accents as a result of the limited tech Batman has at his disposal. Due to the low protection, the suit is heavily damaged while fighting Lady Arkham.

For the second season, The Enemy Within, Batman utilizes a new suit similar to the kevlar-plated suit from The Dark Knight trilogy (known as the "Batsuit Mark III"). This all-black suit functions like all the other suits, is additionally heat-resistant, can also seal itself over wounds to prevent blood loss, and has varying other features (such as a gas mask). The gauntlets can also launch Bat-Anchors, grapple lines which behave like those from the remote claw gun from Batman: Arkham Origins. The Mark I suit and whichever suit the player used at the end of the first game are featured on display in the Batcave.

At the beginning of each game, the player can choose one of four colors for Batman's tech and the Batcomputer: blue, red, yellow, and purple. This choice does not affect either game much (in season 2, the player can also change the color at any point from the game's main menu), though this is played with in first game: each color will have a different hidden message left by the kidnapped Alfred for Batman to find him; and if the player has Fox working directly in the Batcave and checks on the color via the Batcomputer's spacebar before making the antidote for Lady Arkham's drugs, Fox will make a comment that references a Batsuit from different Batman media (i.e. choosing red, Fox will comment giving the suit a red Bat symbol, to which Wayne replies, "Maybe in the future," a reference to the suit from Batman Beyond).
