= Batplane =

Fictional aircraft for the comic book superhero Batman

- Batman and his Batwing (Batplane) as they appeared on the variant cover of Detective Comics #989 (September 2018). Art by Mark Brooks.

Publication information
- Publisher: DC Comics
- First appearance: Detective Comics #31 (September 1939)

In story information
- Element of stories featuring: Batman; Robin

The Batplane, Batwing, Batjet or Batgyro is the fictional aircraft for the DC Comics superhero Batman. The vehicle was introduced in "Batman Versus The Vampire, I", published in Detective Comics #31 in 1939, a story which saw Batman travel to continental Europe. In this issue it was referred to as the "Batgyro", and according to Les Daniels was "apparently inspired by Igor Sikorsky's first successful helicopter flight" of the same year. Initially based upon either an autogyro or helicopter, with a rotor, the Batgyro featured a bat motif at the front. The writers gave the Batgyro the ability to be "parked" in the air by Batman, hovering in such a way as to maintain its position and allow Batman to return.

The Batgyro was soon replaced by the Batplane, which debuted in Batman #1, and initially featured a machine gun. The vehicle was now based on a fixed wing airplane rather than a helicopter, with a propeller at the front, although a bat motif was still attached to the nose-cone. The Batplane has undergone constant revision since its first appearance, and has even been depicted as having the capability to traverse underwater. With the launch of the Tim Burton directed Batman film of 1989, the Batplane became known as the Batwing, a name which was carried over into the comics. Previously in Batman #300 the name Batwing was used in reference to a spacecraft. The 2012 film The Dark Knight Rises also adapted the Batplane to film, however, this time the vehicle was referred to as The Bat.

A sentient version of the Batwing, nicknamed "Wing", appears in Batwheels, voiced by Lilimar Hernandez.

== Background ==
The Bat-gyro as it appeared in Detective Comics No. 31 (September 1939).

Batman once maintained aircraft in his original Batcave. However, launching these planes so close to Wayne Manor's neighboring estates threatened to compromise Batman's secret identity. The Caped Crusader now "borrows" specially-modified jets and helicopters from Wayne Aerospace's business and military contracts.

Batplane I and the Bat-Rocket favored Batman's signature look over sleek aerodynamics.

The origin of Batplane II

Batplane II was a retooled needle-nosed Wayne Aerospace W4 Wraith fighter that married style with substance. In terms of design, it shares features with the Grumman F9F Cougar and McDonnell F-101 Voodoo. When the Batplane is stolen and triplicated by smugglers in Batman #61, Batman and Robin upgrade the Batplane to jet propulsion, adding at least "100 miles per hour" to its maximum speed.

Batplane III is a modified Wayne Aerospace SlipStream ($46 million sans "extras"). It is detailed to resemble a standard mid-size corporate jet during take-offs and landings. Some of its features and capabilities are as follows:

- At cruising altitude (35,000-45,000 ft.), telescoping wings retract. Exterior sections of tail and nose-cone envelop cockpit and cabin fuselage for higher altitude pressurization.
- Gaining further altitude (45,000-55,000 ft.) delta fins in the tail and snub winglets elongate to increase efficiency and stability as speeds approach supersonic.
- At ceiling altitudes (55,000-60,000 ft.) "smart" paint on exterior radar-shielding ceramics responds to dropping air pressure and temperature, thus camouflaging the Batplane's exterior to stealthy black.
- Avionics include ergonomic "at-a-glance" viewing levels for all electronics and multifunction displays. The breakaway canopy allows for pilot/co-pilot emergency ejection. The reinforced acrylic glass canopy windows polarize at stealth altitude.

=== Technical specifications ===
The aircraft's specifications are:

Height: 14.5 ft.
Length: 57.7 ft.
Wingspan: 47.6 ft. - The wings are protected by a bleed-air anti-icing system.
Altitude Ceiling: 60,000 ft.
Maximum Speed: 4,400 mph
Range: 2,486 n m
Take-Off Distance: 5,230 ft.
Landing Distance: 2,984 ft.
Payload: 2,670 lb.
Refueling Time: 7.8 minutes

== In other media ==
=== Live-action films ===
==== Batman ('89) and Batman Forever ====
The Batwing appears in Batman (1989) and Batman Forever. It is destroyed in the former film, but rebuilt and upgraded. Both models of the plane were created with miniature effects.

In Batman, the Batwing was designed by Anton Furst and Julian Caldow and constructed by the John Evans special effects team at Pinewood Studios. Five models were created, with only one in full-scale. A full-size segment of the cockpit was created in front of a blue-screen set for close-up shots of Michael Keaton piloting the craft. The Batplane's redesign in Forever was devised by Barbara Ling and Matt Codd and has a ribbed body and tail fin similar to the Batmobile.

This version of Batplane also makes an appearance in The Flash. In this movie, the Batplane has seen some improvements after its destruction by the Joker, including folding wings and rear seats with built-in parachutes.

==== The Dark Knight Trilogy ====
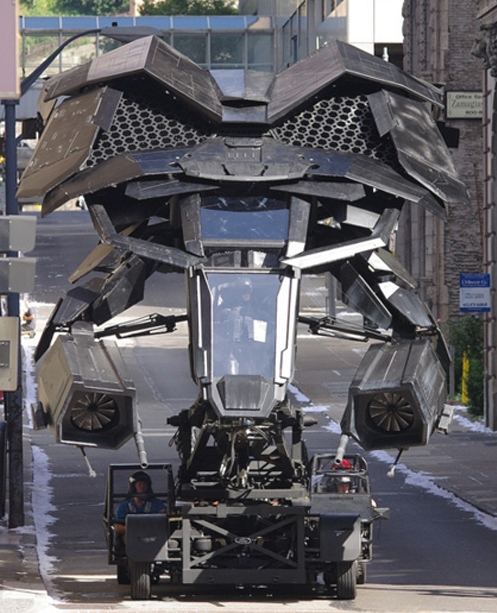
"The Bat" in the set of The Dark Knight Rises in June 2011

An entirely new version of the Batwing appears in the film The Dark Knight Rises, referred to simply as the Bat. It is an unconventional, lightweight VTOL aircraft with a ventrally mounted rotor. Developed by Lucius Fox, the Bat was originally intended for close-quarters urban military operations but instead becomes Batman's new primary vehicle.

The Bat was designed by Nathan Crowley, who based it on the Harrier jump jet, Bell Boeing V-22 Osprey, and Boeing AH-64 Apache. Chris Corbould described the Bat's size and shape as presenting a major challenge for filming due to Christopher Nolan's emphasis on practical effects over computer-generated imagery. The Bat was variously supported by wires and mounted on a purpose-built vehicle with hydraulic controls to simulate movement.

==== DC Extended Universe ====
The Batplane appears in the 2016 film Batman v Superman: Dawn of Justice. Here it is shown as a lightweight VTOL aircraft armed with machine guns and missiles, with a function that allows Alfred to remotely assume control.

The Batplane was largely rendered via CGI by Scanline VFX, with only its cockpit being physical. It was modeled after the Northrop Grumman X-47B and the Lockheed Martin F-35 Lightning II.

This design of the Batplane also makes a cameo appearance in Justice League.

=== Animation ===
- The Batplane, referred to as the Batjet, appears in Super Friends.
- The Batplane, referred to as the Batwing, appears in series set in the DC Animated Universe (DCAU).
- The Batplane appears in Batman: The Brave and the Bold.
- The Batplane appears in The Batman.
- The Batplane appears in Young Justice.
- The Batplane appears in Harley Quinn.
- Wing, a sentient version of the Batplane, appears in Batwheels, voiced by Lilimar Hernandez. Wing is loosely based on the 1989 Batman's Batwing

=== Video games ===
- The Batplane appears in the Batman: Arkham series.
- The Batplane appears in Lego Dimensions as part of The Lego Batman Movie DLC.

=== Other appearances ===
==== Lego Batman ====
Lego's Lego Batman line includes one set which features an incarnation of the Batplane, though it goes by the name of "The Batwing" (7782 The Batwing: The Joker's Aerial Assault). The set is featured alongside the Joker's helicopter. Lego also made another set named (6863 Batwing battle over Gotham City) with the similar type of vehicles. In 2020, Lego produced the set 1989 Batwing, re-creating the vehicle from the 1989 film.

==== Six Flags Over Texas ====
The Gotham City section of Six Flags Over Texas includes a child-focused ride called "Batwing", which consists of two passenger seats that go in circles while moving up and down.

== See also ==
- Batboat
- Batcopter
- Batcycle
- Batmobile
