= Batcave =

Secret headquarters of the DC Comics superhero Batman

- Concept art of the Batcave featuring its iconic trophies, including the Giant Penny, mechanical T-Rex, and Joker playing card.
- First appearance: "The Electrical Brain", Batman film serial, 1943
- Created by: Harry L. Fraser
- Genre: Superhero comics

In-universe information
- Type: Underground base of operations
- Locations: Wayne Manor
- Characters: Batman; Robin (various); Alfred Pennyworth; Harold Allnut; Ace the Bat-Hound; Barbara Gordon; Cassandra Cain; Huntress (Helena Bertinelli); Stephanie Brown; Dick Grayson; Jason Todd; Tim Drake; Damian Wayne; Duke Thomas; The Outsiders
- Publisher: DC Comics

The Batcave is a fictional subterranean cave appearing in the Batman franchise, first created for the 1943 Batman film serial. It is the headquarters of the superhero Batman and his partners, and located beneath Wayne Manor, personal residence of Batman's secret identity Bruce Wayne.

The Batcave first appeared in the Batman film serial chapter entitled "The Electrical Brain". Bob Kane, who was on the film set, then portrayed the cave in the Batman dailies on October 29, 1943, in a strip entitled "The Bat Cave!" The Batcave made its comic book debut in Detective Comics #83 in January 1944. Over the decades, the cave has been expanded to include a vast trophy room, supercomputer, and forensics lab. There has been little consistency as to the floor plan of the Batcave or its contents. The design has varied from artist to artist and it is not unusual for the same artist to draw the cave layout differently in various issues.

The Batcave has also appeared in the film serial Batman and Robin (1949), Batman television series (1966–1968), films Batman (1966), Batman (1989), Batman Returns (1992), Batman Forever (1995), Batman and Robin (1997), The Dark Knight Trilogy (2005–2012), DC Extended Universe films (2016–2023), as well as The Batman (2022).

== Creation ==
The Batcave first became part of the Batman mythos in the 1943 15-chapter serial Batman starring Lewis Wilson. In this version, as later in the comics, it is a small cave with a desk and rock walls lit up by candles. Behind the desk is a large black bat symbol. The cave is connected to a crime lab. Bats were depicted as flying around the cave, although only their shadows are visible. Batman uses these bats as a scare tactic to make an apprehended enemy reveal information. To prevent the enemy from escaping, an iron door covers the exit.

The comics originally only portrayed a secret tunnel that ran underground between Wayne Manor and a dusty old barn where the Batmobile was kept. Later, in Batman #12 (August–September 1942), Bill Finger mentioned "secret underground hangars". In 1943, the writers of the first Batman film serial gave Batman a complete underground crime lab and introduced it in the second chapter, entitled "The Bat's Cave". The entrance was via a secret passage through a grandfather clock and included bats flying around.

Bob Kane, who was on the film set, mentioned this to Finger who was going to be the initial scripter on the Batman daily newspaper strip. Finger included with his script a clipping from Popular Mechanics that featured a detailed cross-section of underground hangars. Kane used this clipping as a guide, adding a study, crime lab, workshop, hangar and garage. This illustration appeared in the Batman "dailies" on October 29, 1943, in a strip entitled "The Bat Cave!".

In this early version, the cave was described as Batman's underground study and, like the other rooms, was just a small alcove with a desk and filing cabinets. Like in the film serial, Batman's symbol was carved into the rock behind the desk and had a candle in the middle of it. The entrance was via a bookcase which led to a secret elevator.

The Batcave was also featured and expanded on in the 1949 serial Batman and Robin. In this serial, there are filing cabinets and the cave now has a crime lab built in. The cave also contains the first incarnation of a batphone.

The Batcave made its comic book debut in Detective Comics #83 in January 1944.

== Comics ==
=== Fictional history ===
The Batcave in Justice #5 (June 2006). Art by Alex Ross.

The cave was discovered and used long before by Bruce Wayne's ancestors as a storehouse as well as a means of transporting escaped slaves during the Civil War era. Bruce rediscovered the caves as a boy when he fell through a dilapidated well on his estate, but did not consider it as a potential base of operations until returning to Gotham to become Batman. In earlier versions of the story, Bruce discovered the cave as an adult.

Upon his initial foray into crime-fighting, Bruce used the caves as a sanctum and to store his then-minimal equipment. As time went on, Bruce found the place ideal to create a stronghold for his war against crime, and has incorporated a plethora of equipment as well as expanding the cave for specific uses.

=== Access ===
The cave is accessible in several ways. It can be reached through a secret door in Wayne Manor itself, which is almost always depicted as in the main study, often behind a grandfather clock which unlocks when the hands are set to the time that Bruce Wayne's parents were murdered, 10:48 pm. In Batman (1966), the cave entrance is behind a bookcase that hides firepoles which was opened when Bruce Wayne activated a control switch hidden in a bust of William Shakespeare, while Wayne's butler, Alfred Pennyworth uses a separate service elevator. An entrance under Bruce Wayne's chair in his office in Wayne Enterprises, as shown in Batman Forever, connects to a mile-long tunnel that Bruce travels through in a high-speed personal transportation capsule. In Batman Begins and The Dark Knight Rises, the cave is accessible through a secret door disguised as part of a large display case and is unlocked by pressing a sequence of keys on the nearby grand piano.

Another secret entrance, covered by a waterfall, pond, hologram, or a camouflaged door, allows access to a service road for the Batmobile. Another alternate entrance is the dry well where Bruce originally discovered the Batcave, highlighted especially during the Knightfall comic book storyline. At one point, Dick Grayson and Tim Drake use the dry well to get into the cave, which they had been locked out of by Azrael during his time as Batman, and Bruce Wayne used it to infiltrate the cave and confront the insane Valley in the final battle between the two men for the title of the Batman. Lured into the narrow tunnel, Valley was forced to remove the massive Bat-armor he had developed, thus allowing Wayne to force Valley to remit his claim to the title.

=== Functions ===
The Batcave serves as Batman's secret headquarters and the command center, where he monitors all crisis points in Gotham City, as well as the rest of the world.

The cave's centerpiece is a supercomputer whose specs are on par with any of those used by leading national security agencies; it permits global surveillance and also connects to a massive information network as well as storing vast amounts of information. A series of satellite link-ups allows easy access to Batman's information network anywhere around the globe. The systems are protected against unauthorized access, and any attempt to breach their security immediately sends an alert to Batman or Oracle.

The partially destroyed Batcave. Cover to Batman: Shadow of the Bat #79 (1998). Art by Glen Orbik.

Additionally, the cave features state-of-the-art facilities such as a crime lab, various specialized laboratories, mechanized workshops, personal gymnasium, parking, docking and hangar space for his vehicles as well as separate exits for each type, memorabilia of past campaigns, a vast library, a large bat colony, and a Justice League teleporter. It also has medical facilities as well as various areas used in training exercises for Batman and his allies.

The cave houses Batman's vast array of specialized vehicles, foremost being the Batmobile in all its incarnations. Other vehicles within the complex include various motorcycles, air- and watercraft such as the Batplane, a single-occupant supersonic jet, and the Subway Rocket.

During the Cataclysm storyline, the cave is seriously damaged in an earthquake, with the Bat-family relocating most of the trophies and equipment in the cave to offsite storage to conceal Batman's identity. During the later reconstruction, Wayne Manor incorporates additional safeguards against future quakes and even a potential nuclear catastrophe, outfitting the cave as a virtual bomb shelter or an enhanced panic room. The city's earthquake alters the caverns of the Batcave, with eight new levels now making up Batman's secret refuge of high-tech laboratory, library, training areas, storage areas, and vehicle accesses. It also includes an "island" computer platform with seven linked Cray T932 mainframes and a state-of-the-art hologram projector. There is also a selection of retractable glass maps within the computer platform. Kevlar shieldings are prepared to protect the cave's computer systems from seismic activity. With the cave's various facilities spread amid limestone stalactites and stalagmites, Batman builds retractable multi-walkway bridges, stairs, elevators, and poles to access its facilities.

The Batcave is rigged with a sophisticated security system to prevent all measure of infiltration. The security measures include motion sensors, silent alarms, steel and lead mechanical doors which could lock a person in or out, and a security mode which is specifically designed to stop if not eliminate all Justice League members in the event that any of them go rogue.

=== Memorabilia ===
The Batcave in Forever Evil #4 (Feb. 2014). The animatronic Tyrannosaurus Rex, giant Lincoln penny, and oversized Joker playing card are seen on the right. Art by David Finch

The cave stores unique memorabilia items collected from the various cases Batman has worked on over the years. Originally, these were stored in a room designed just for them; it was explained that Batman and Robin took one memento from each case. Later, the trophies were shown to be in the large main area of the cave, residing among the rest of the Batcave's furnishings.

The most regularly featured trophies are a full-size animatronic Tyrannosaurus rex, a giant replica of a Lincoln penny, and an oversized Joker playing card. The T. Rex comes from an adventure on "Dinosaur Island" (Batman #35 1946); the penny was originally a trophy from Batman's encounter with a penny-obsessed villain named the Penny Plunderer (World's Finest Comics #30 1947), but was later retconned into being from an encounter with Two-Face. Other "keepsakes" in the cave come from "The Thousand and One Trophies of Batman!" (Detective Comics #158, 1950). These three stories were reprinted in Batman #256.

There is also a glass case display of Jason Todd's Robin costume as a memorial to him, with the epitaph "A Good Soldier", which remains even after Todd's resurrection. Barbara Gordon's Batgirl costume also remains on display.

After the Flashpoint comic book storyline, a letter written by a Thomas Wayne from an alternate timeline addressed to Bruce Wayne has lain in a display case, as a reminder of Thomas's love for his son and encouraging him to move on from his past. The letter was destroyed by the reborn Eobard Thawne as a way to hurt Bruce for Thomas's attempt to kill him.

=== "Batcave" safehouses ===
The "bat bunker" in Batman and Robin #1 (August 2009). Art by Frank Quitely

When Jean-Paul Valley takes over the role of Batman, Tim Drake uses an abandoned barn nearby Wayne Manor and his own house to hide his own land vehicle, the Red Bird, and in time it becomes his own safe house after he adds his computer and portable equipment. After Bane's attack during the Knightfall story arc, Bruce Wayne swore that he would never be caught unprepared to defend Gotham City ever again. When Dick Grayson became Batman during the Prodigal storyline, Bruce established satellite Batcaves throughout the city to act as safehouses.

Four Satellite Batcaves used during No Man's Land. Clockwise from top left: Central Batcave, Batcave South, Northwest Batcave, and Batcave East. Art by Stan Boch

Other satellite Batcaves, introduced during No Man's Land, include Batcave Central, located fifty feet below the bottom of Robinson Park Reservoir and accessible through a secret entrance at the foot of one of the Twelve Caesars statues at the north of the park; Batcave South, a boiler room of a derelict shipping yard on the docks across from Paris Island that is accessible through a number of false manholes planted throughout Old Gotham streets; Batcave South-Central, a four-block stretch of track sealed in 1896 and forgotten in the Old Gotham prototype subway station; Batcave Northwest, located in the subbasement of Arkham Asylum, stocked with emergency rations, all-terrain vehicles, and battery-powered communication equipment; and Batcave East, an abandoned oil refinery once used by Wayne Enterprises.

== In other media ==
=== Feature films ===
==== Batman (1966) ====
The Batcave from the 1966 television series was portrayed in the corresponding film released after the first television season.

==== Tim Burton/Joel Schumacher films ====
- In Tim Burton's 1989 Batman feature film, the cave is shown to house the Batmobile, which is parked on a turntable-like platform at the edge of a large chasm filled with pipes. The Batmoblie enters the cave from a rock cliff/door. The cave also features the Batcomputer, which is on a metal platform. There is also an office-like workstation, unspecified machinery, and a large vault for Batman's costume.
- The cave is once again seen in Batman Returns, and Bruce gains access to it via a tube/elevator like passage from Wayne Manor, the entrance to which is hidden in an iron maiden, and is activated by flipping a small switch. The cave has a forensics lab, a computer, unspecified machines, a closet for the costumes, the Batmobile, and its repair tools.
- In Batman Forever, the Batcave is accessed through a rotating shelf which led to a staircase in Wayne Manor's silver closet, the only room in the mansion that is kept locked. The cave can also be reached via a secret tunnel system from Bruce Wayne's office at Wayne Enterprises, through which he rides down in a capsule. The capsule has a communication device Bruce used to communicate with Alfred. The cave features the main computer, as well as a crime lab and canal, the latter of which provides sea access. The cave also includes a tunnel used to launch the Batwing, a rotating turntable that houses the Batmobile, and a large dome-like structure where Bruce's Batsuit and gadgets are stored.
- The incarnation of the cave in Batman & Robin features a multitude of flashing lights, mostly in neon. On the whole, this Batcave is similar to that in Batman Forever, only more garish in its decoration. A capsule containing Robin's Redbird motorcycle rises out of the floor, and a long tunnel lined with neon lights leads out of the cave. The turntable holding the batmobile returns, but in a more elaborate fashion. The cave features the area used to store Batman's costume and a place to store Robin's.

==== The Dark Knight Trilogy ====
- In Batman Begins, the cave is still unfurnished, and the only things inside are a small workshop and a storage space for the Batsuit and its accessories, a medical area, and the Batmobile. The entrance and exit for the Batmobile are on a cliff, behind a waterfall. Alfred reveals to Bruce that during the Civil War, the Waynes used the vast cavern system as part of the Underground Railroad: after initially abseiling down a well to get into the cave, they discover a hidden Civil War-era mechanical elevator which is still functional and leads to a hidden entrance in the mansion, which they then use as the primary means of entrance to the cave. The elevator is accessed by tapping three keys on a piano.
- As Wayne Manor is still under construction in The Dark Knight, Batman's base of operations has been relocated to a large bunker beneath a shipping yard. One access point shown is through a shipping container which houses a secret hydraulic lift. The "Bat-bunker" also contains a wire mesh cage for the Batsuit, along with the associated weapons and tools, toolbox, and spare equipment for the Batmobile.
- The Batcave reappears in The Dark Knight Rises in full working condition. To access the cave, a similar way to Batman Begins, tapping three keys on the piano will reveal a now modernly built elevator which takes the passenger straight to the cave. The newest addition to the cave is "The Bat", a flying tank aircraft built by Wayne Enterprises, and a Batcomputer as well as numerous landing pads and a locking case which contains the Batsuit. Added features included that the bridges used to gain access to different sections can be submerged as well as the platforms as a form of security measures in case anyone gains unauthorized access to the cave. While submerged the only visible object is a Batcomputer terminal which can only be accessed by either Bruce or Alfred's fingerprints and an access code. The cave from The Dark Knight appears as well, which contains weapons, supplies, and a back-up Batsuit.

==== DC Extended Universe ====
- In Batman v Superman: Dawn of Justice, the Batcave is not located directly underneath Wayne Manor, but was originally in the woods on the manor's outskirts, with Bruce discovering the cave when he fell into them after running away during his parents' funeral. After Wayne Manor was destroyed in a fire, Bruce and Alfred relocated to a glass house built above the Batcave. The upper level includes the Batcomputer and a workshop where Bruce and Alfred can work on Batman's various weapons, including the synthesiser used to distort his voice in the regular suit and the armour he uses to fight Superman.
- In Justice League, following Superman's death, Bruce continues to operate out of the Batcave, which it is revealed also includes a large hangar where he has been working on a secret troop transport for the team he has been planning to create following Superman's death. As he works on the transport, he is visited by Diana, and notes that the cave's security cost him millions of dollars. Once the team of himself, Diana, Barry Allen, Victor Stone and Arthur Curry have come together for the first time to confront Steppenwolf, Bruce takes them to the Batcave to plan their next move, with Barry running all around the cave in seconds upon arrival.
- In The Flash (2023), the Batcave set was designed to be an exact replica of the one from the 1989 Batman film, which deeply affected Michael Keaton, as he was "emotional" upon seeing it. This was the largest Batcave set ever constructed for a film production, reflecting the significance of the Burtonverse in the film. The set was built entirely on the studio lot, offering a full, immersive experience for the actors and crew. It included the original 1989 Batmobile and other key elements from the Burton films.

==== The Batman (2022) ====
A new version of the Batcave appears in The Batman. The Batcave is an old Wayne Terminus railway station into his hidden headquarters, accessed through a series of secret tunnels underneath Wayne Tower.

==== The Lego Batman Movie ====
The Batcave is featured in The Lego Batman Movie. This version of the Batcave is larger and contains many versions of the Batmobile, Bat-themed vehicles and Batsuits. It is controlled by Batman's sentient, HAL-9000-like, Batcomputer (voiced by Siri), nicknamed 'Puter'.

=== Television ===
==== Batman ====
The 1960s live-action Batman TV series featured the Batcave extensively, and portrayed it as a large but well-lit cavern containing an atomic power generator, a chemistry lab, punch-card computers, and other electronic crime-fighting devices, almost always prominently labeled with their function. In this incarnation, it primarily served as a crime lab and garage for the Batmobile. In this version, the Batcave is accessed from Wayne Manor via two Bat-Poles, which are hidden behind a bookcase that can be opened by turning a switch hidden inside a bust of Shakespeare. When Bruce and Dick slide down these Bat-Poles, they are instantly outfitted in their costumes before reaching the landing pads at the bottom. The Bat-Poles can also be used to lift Bruce and Dick up from the Batcave to Wayne Manor by use of the steamjet-propelled landing pads. The Batcave is also accessible via a service elevator used by Alfred.

==== Early animation ====
The Bat-Cave was first seen in animation in episodes of The Batman/Superman Hour, Super Friends, and The New Adventures of Batman. In these cartoons, the Batcomputer is present as usual. The voice of the Batcomputer was done by Lou Scheimer in The New Adventures of Batman.

==== DC Animated Universe ====
In the Batman: The Animated Series episode "Beware the Gray Ghost", the Batcave is revealed to be a replica of the lair used by the Gray Ghost, a film character and Bruce's idol. Bats are seen flying freely in the cave, with large naturally elevated platforms on which Robin practices balance. Batman's numerous crime-fighting vehicles are seen parked in an adjacent compartment to the Batcave, with an adjoining subterranean garage which stores Bruce Wayne's car collection.

The future Batcave of Batman Beyond houses replicas of Batman's enemies (both as wax dummies and robot combat trainers), and a display case with the many permutations of costumes of Robin, Batgirl, Nightwing, and Batman himself.

In Batman Beyond 2.0, Terry McGinnis no longer uses the Batcave following an argument with Bruce. After arriving in the universe controlled by the Justice Lords, Terry encounters his alternate universe counterpart, T, who is a member of the Jokerz. Terry and T arrive at Wayne Manor to find that it had been destroyed by the Justice Lords. Following the defeat of Lord Superman, T and Dick Grayson of the Justice Lords universe begin rebuilding the Batcave.

==== The Batman ====
The Batman features a much more high-tech Batcave, with large computer displays and flashing blue lights. Among these displays are the "Bat-Wave" warning signals, an alternate way of calling upon the Caped Crusader before the Bat-Signal went into service. As a throwback to the 1960s Batman series, the cave has assorted 'Bat-poles' for Batman and Robin which allow them to traverse faster. The episode "Joker's Express" reveals that the Batcave is connected to some old mines beneath the city that were created during its past as a coal-mining town in the late 1800s. Unlike many other incarnations of the Batcave which only have one exit/entrance, the Batmobile and other vehicles exit the cave through a variety of concealed dead-ends and disguised construction sites scattered around Gotham City. Batman also established a series of satellite Batcaves across Gotham.

==== Batman: The Brave and the Bold ====
The Batcave appears in Batman: The Brave and the Bold. This version displays numerous trophies that reference the 1960s Batman series, namely a giant clam and slot machine-themed electric chair. A future version appears in "Last Bat on Earth!", where it is inhabited by a group of humanoid "Man-Bats".

==== Teen Titans ====
The Batcave makes a minor appearance in the Teen Titans episode "Haunted".

==== Young Justice ====
The Batcave appears in the Young Justice episode "Downtime".

==== Beware the Batman ====
In Beware the Batman, similarly to other versions, the Batcave is located underneath Wayne Manor; in this continuity, however, the entrance is hidden behind a large fireplace in Bruce Wayne's trophy room. Batman brings unconscious guests, such as Man-Bat and Manhunter, to the cave for questioning. In the series finale, Deathstroke infiltrates the Batcave and attempts to destroy it until Batman stops him.

==== Teen Titans Go! ====
The Batcave appears in the Teen Titans Go! episode, "Sidekick", where Robin is tasked with watching over the cave while Batman is away, only for the other Teen Titans to show up and mess with Batman's various gadgets, costumes, and trophies. The Batcave makes continuous appearances in later episodes.

==== Batwoman ====
In the TV series Batwoman, Bruce has a Batcave in Wayne Towers which is used by his cousin Kate, Luke Fox and later Ryan Wilder when she takes over the Batwoman position. It was later revealed that a Batmobile was stored behind a hidden wall, which Ryan used during her tenure as Batwoman.

==== Titans ====
The Batcave appears in Titans.

==== Batwheels ====
The Batcave appears in Batwheels. It is overseen by the Batcomputer (voiced by Kimberly Brooks) and original character M.O.E. (voiced by Mick Wingert).

=== Video games ===
The Batcave appears as a level in Mortal Kombat vs. DC Universe.

In Gotham Knights, the Batcave makes an appearance during the opening scene of the game, being the site of Batman's final confrontation with Ra's al Ghul. After being mortally wounded, Batman activates the cave's self-destruct protocol, killing himself and Ra's.

==== Injustice ====
In the video game Injustice: Gods Among Us, the Batcave is one of the many levels included, where the fighters can use Batman's various weapons and vehicles to damage their opponent. In the story campaign, Green Arrow faces a villainous Wonder Woman and Black Adam in the Batcave while attempting to acquire a kryptonite weapon to defeat the corrupted Superman of an alternate reality. The 'true' Batman also fights his alternate counterpart in the Batcave to convince him to go along with the plan of summoning the Superman of his world to defeat the villainous alternate Superman.

A new version of the Batcave appears as a level in Injustice 2. This version was originally the Gotham Underground Subway built by Bruce's great-grandfather. It is also where Bruce keeps his communications and surveillance hub, Brother Eye.

==== Lego Batman ====
The Batcave is featured as one of the two main hubs, alongside Arkham Asylum, in Lego Batman: The Videogame. It is accessed through an elevator inside Wayne Manor and can be used to start each hero level, as well as view unlockables and purchase additional characters via the Batcomputer.

The Batcave appears in Lego Batman 2: DC Super Heroes. It features three parking 'areas' for land, sea, and air-based vehicles and their appropriate exits from the cave. It also includes the Batcomputer, used to replay past levels and 'warp' to various landmarks around Gotham, and other elements shown in Batman media, such as a waterfall, a Lincoln penny, and an animatronic T-Rex.

The Batcave returns in Lego Batman 3: Beyond Gotham as one of the hub areas and the main setting for the second level of the game, "Breaking BATS!" The cave is also featured in Lego Batman: Legacy of the Dark Knight.

==== Batman: Arkham ====
In the 2009 video game Batman: Arkham Asylum, Batman can access an auxiliary Batcave hidden within the cave system beneath Arkham Island after the Joker takes control of the asylum. This Batcave is small and fairly spartan compared to its comic counterpart, containing only two small platforms, a Batcomputer, and one of Batman's Batwing planes. Near the end of the game, this cave is partially destroyed by Poison Ivy.

Although not featured in the main story, the Batcave does appear as a downloadable challenge map in Batman: Arkham City. During the main story, Batman is able to access the Batcomputer's database via his batsuit and can upload data to Alfred, who analyzes it using the Batcomputer back at the Batcave.

The Batcave is accessible in the main campaign of Batman: Arkham Origins. From the cave, the player can use the Batwing fast travel system, switch to alternate costumes, and access challenge map rooms (which was done from the main menu in the previous two games).

Although the Batcave is not accessible in Batman: Arkham Knight, Alfred coordinates all activity from it. He also activates the Knightfall Protocol from within the cave using Bruce's voice authorization password, "Martha". After Wayne Manor is destroyed when Bruce activates the protocol, the fate of the Batcave is left unclear.

While the Batcave is not accessible in Batman: Arkham Shadow, similarly to Batman: Arkham Asylum, a backup Batcave built underneath Blackgate Penitentiary can be used during the main story. It features a spare Batcomputer, a training station for accessing challenges, and an area that allows players to return to Gotham City. It also has an entrance/exit that players can use to switch between Matches Malone and Batman. Additionally, the cave is where messages and voicemails left by other characters can be accessed, including Vicki Vale, Lucius Fox, Harvey Dent, Selina Kyle, Andrea Beaumont, and an Arkham Asylum C.A.A.R.E. Representative.
