= The Joker: Devil's Advocate =

American one-shot superhero comic book

- Cover to The Joker: Devil's Advocate. Art by Graham Nolan.

Publication information
- Publisher: DC Comics
- Format: One-shot
- Genre: Superhero, crime
- Publication date: 1996
- No. of issues: 1
- Main character: The Joker; Batman; Robin; James Gordon

Creative team
- Created by: Chuck Dixon; Graham Nolan
- Written by: Chuck Dixon
- Artist: Graham Nolan
- Inker: Scott Hanna
- Letterer: John Constanza
- Colorist: Pat Garrahy
- Editor: Scott Peterson

Collected editions
- The Joker: Devil's Advocate: ISBN 1-56389-240-5

The Joker: Devil's Advocate is an American one-shot superhero comic book written by Chuck Dixon and drawn by Graham Nolan, published by DC Comics in 1996. Several recurring characters of the Batman family appear in the story, such as Robin, James Gordon, Barbara Gordon, and Alfred Pennyworth.

== Synopsis ==
The post office puts out a new set of postage stamps commemorating famous comedians, but some of the sets have Joker venom on the back; people who lick them die grinning. The Joker, who is angry about not having his own stamp, takes hostages at the post office, and is captured by Batman. The DA decides to try Joker for murder, and he's found guilty and sentenced to death. Batman, however, believes that Joker was not the one who poisoned the stamps, and he sets out to find the real killer, even though doing so would save the Joker's life.

== Characters ==
- Batman
- Robin
- The Joker
- James Gordon
- Alfred Pennyworth
- Barbara Gordon
- Harvey Bullock
- Renee Montoya
- Billy Pettit
- Sarah Essen
- Stan Kitch
