= Lucius Fox =

Fictional character

- Lucius Fox as depicted in Batman #307 (January 1979); Art by John Calnan and Dick Giordano

Publication information
- Publisher: DC Comics
- First appearance: Batman #307 (January 1979)
- Created by: Len Wein (writer); John Calnan (artist)

In-story information
- Full name: Lucius Fox
- Team affiliations: Wayne Enterprises
- Supporting character of: Batman (Bruce Wayne); Batman (Jace Fox); Batwing (Luke Fox); Batgirl (Tiffany Fox); Robin (various)

Lucius Fox is a character appearing in American comic books published by DC Comics, commonly in association with the superhero Batman. He is Wayne's business manager at Wayne Enterprises who runs the business interests that supply his equipment needs as well as financing his operations, and is the father of Luke Fox / Batwing, Tiffany Fox / Batgirl, and Jace Fox / Batman.

Lucius Fox has been featured in various media adaptations. The character was voiced by Brock Peters in Batman: The Animated Series, Mel Winkler in The New Batman Adventures, Louis Gossett Jr. in The Batman, Phil LaMarr in DC Super Hero Girls, and Dave Fennoy in the video game Batman: Arkham Knight. Lucius Fox made his live-action debut in The Dark Knight Trilogy, portrayed by Morgan Freeman, with Chris Chalk portraying him in the television series Gotham, and Simon Manyonda portraying a young version of Chalk's Lucius Fox in the second and third seasons of the television series Pennyworth. Hugh Maguire portrays an Irish Catholic substitute of the character named Jack Fox O'Dwyer in the DC Extended Universe (DCEU) film Batman v Superman: Dawn of Justice.

== Publication history ==
Lucius Fox was created by writer Len Wein and penciller John Calnan and first appeared in Batman #307 (January 1979).

== Fictional character biography ==
As CEO and President of Wayne Enterprises, Lucius Fox is one of Bruce Wayne's closest allies. He is an experienced businessman, entrepreneur, and inventor who runs the business interests that supply weapons, gadgets, vehicles, and armor for Bruce Wayne to use when he fights crime as the vigilante Batman. The character is depicted as being aware that Bruce Wayne is Batman, having replaced Alfred Pennyworth in cave operations after Alfred's death at the hands of Bane.

=== Business career ===
Lucius Fox is regarded as having the "Midas Touch", an ability to turn failing businesses into successful conglomerates, and is consequently a highly sought-after businessman throughout the corporate world. Fox is called in to the failing Wayne Enterprises and brings balance to both Bruce Wayne's private and business finances. In Batman Confidential, he is shown heading the project that produced the prototype that would become the Batwing. He also manages the particulars of the Wayne Foundation while Bruce dictates the organization's general policies. Since then, Fox has been approached repeatedly by other companies seeking his expertise. After overcoming the original challenge of returning Wayne Enterprises to its former glory, Fox has elected to stay, having been given an unparalleled freedom in the company.

In Batman: Haunted Knight, it is explained that a young Bruce Wayne rescued Lucius Fox from muggers in Paris. Later, Fox asked him if he wants to start a foundation for charity, to which Bruce agrees many years later, deciding that not all of his money has to go to crime fighting.

Bruce Wayne, as Batman, originally forms the Outsiders to rescue Fox from Baron Bedlam. When Fox later suffers a stroke, Bruce makes sure that Fox gets the best care possible and supports him and his family.

After Bruce Wayne announces his public support for Batman Inc., Fox becomes active supplying him with the company's resources and research prototypes.

=== Family life ===
With his wife Tanya, Lucius has several children, all introduced in the comics at different stages over the years. His youngest daughter, Tiffany, was first shown in Batman #308 (1979), but was not substantially explored until 2011's The New 52 reboot of DC's continuity, which reintroduced her along with her siblings in Batwing #22. The alternative future story shown in Batgirl: Futures End (2014) shows Tiffany grows up to be a gifted protege of Barbara Gordon, becoming one of several women to use the Batgirl moniker, with a pink-accented Batsuit.

Fox's daughter Tam is introduced in Red Robin. Her father sends her to personally locate Tim Drake, only to discover his secret identity as Red Robin and become involved in his conflicts with the League of Assassins. For a time it was believed Fox was dead, but this was a ruse to help combat his enemies. It is believed that learning Drake's secrets has led Tam Fox to realize that Bruce Wayne is Batman. However, she apparently did not report her findings to her father.

Prior to The New 52, Lucius had a son named Timothy whose occasional delinquency embarrassed his father. Tim, now calling himself 'Jace', returns in the Infinite Frontier miniseries The Next Batman: Second Son.

Lucius also has a son named Lucas "Luke" Fox, introduced in the New 52 continuity, who is an intellectual prodigy and mixed martial artist and who, unbeknownst to his father, was selected and trained by Bruce Wayne to become the vigilante known as Batwing using a high-tech Batsuit designed by his father. Both Luke and his predecessor as Batwing, David Zavimbe, are agents of the international crime-fighting organization Batman Incorporated.

== Alternative versions ==
- An alternate universe version of Lucius Fox from Earth-3 appears in JLA. This version is a Caucasian gang boss and ally of the Crime Syndicate of America.
- An alternate universe version of Lucius Fox appears in Batman: Earth One. This version is an intern at Wayne Medical who becomes Wayne Enterprises' head of research and development after deducing Batman's secret identity.
- The pre-Crisis incarnation of Lucius Fox appears in Convergence.

== In other media ==
=== Television ===
==== Animation ====
- Lucius Fox appears in series set in the DC Animated Universe (DCAU).
  - Introduced in Batman: The Animated Series, voiced by Brock Peters, this version is unaware of Bruce Wayne's secret identity.
  - Fox appears in The New Batman Adventures, voiced by Mel Winkler.

Lucius Fox as depicted in The Batman.

- Lucius Fox appears in The Batman, voiced by Louis Gossett Jr. This version is based on the version from Christopher Nolan's Dark Knight trilogy, being an old friend of Bruce Wayne's father who is aware of Bruce's secret identity as Batman and helped design most of his arsenal and construct the Batcave.
- Lucius Fox appears in DC Super Hero Girls, voiced by Phil LaMarr. This version is a teacher at Super Hero High.
- Lucius Fox appears in Harley Quinn, voiced again by Phil LaMarr.
- Lucius Fox appears in Batman: Caped Crusader, voiced by Bumper Robinson. This version is Bruce Wayne's lawyer who is depicted as around the same age as him.

==== Live-action ====
- A young Lucius Fox appears in Gotham, portrayed by Chris Chalk. This version is initially an employee of Wayne Enterprises before leaving to join the Gotham City Police Department as a scientific specialist in the third season.
  - Fox appears in the prequel series Pennyworth, portrayed by Simon Manyonda. Introduced in the second season as a scientist affiliate of Thomas Wayne's who works for the CIA to infiltrate the Raven Union, he later becomes a member of the English League.
- Lucius Fox appears in Batwoman, portrayed by Domonique Adam. This version was killed by former police officer turned Crows agent Miguel Robles three years prior to the series. Additionally, an A.I. based on Fox (voiced by Donny Lucas) created to assist Luke Fox appears as well.

=== Film ===
==== Live-action ====
Morgan Freeman as Lucius Fox in Batman Begins (2005)

- Lucius Fox appears in the Dark Knight Trilogy, portrayed by Morgan Freeman.
  - Introduced in Batman Begins, this version is a research head for Wayne Enterprises and friend of Thomas Wayne who is demoted to the Applied Sciences division, which involves overseeing the supplies of aborted research projects and prototypes. At the end of the film, Bruce Wayne fires Wayne Enterprises' CEO William Earle and appoints Fox as his successor.
  - In The Dark Knight, Fox assists Bruce by designing a new Batsuit and locating the Joker.
  - In The Dark Knight Rises, Fox has become the president of a nearly bankrupt Wayne Enterprises, with Wayne Enterprises board member Miranda Tate taking over the role of chairman and CEO.
- Lucius Fox was intended to appear in Batman v Superman: Dawn of Justice, before being replaced with original character Jack Fox O'Dwyer (portrayed by Hugh Maguire).

==== Animation ====
- Lucius Fox appears in the Batman: Gotham Knight segment "Field Test", voiced by Kevin Michael Richardson.
- Lucius Fox appears in Batman: Bad Blood, voiced by Ernie Hudson.
- Lucius Fox makes a non-speaking cameo appearance in Batman: Hush.
- An alternate universe version of Lucius Fox appears in Batman: The Doom That Came to Gotham, voiced by Tim Russ.

=== Video games ===
- Lucius Fox appears in the Batman Begins tie-in game, voiced by Morgan Freeman.
- Lucius Fox appears in DC Universe Online, voiced by Leif Anders.
- Lucius Fox appears as a playable character in the Nintendo DS version of Lego Batman: The Videogame.
- Lucius Fox appears in The Dark Knight Rises tie-in game, voiced by Ezra Knight.
- Lucius Fox appears in Scribblenauts Unmasked: A DC Comics Adventure.
- Lucius Fox appears in Batman: Arkham Knight, voiced by Dave Fennoy. Following the alleged death of Bruce Wayne, he assumes full ownership of Wayne Enterprises.
- Lucius Fox appears in Batman: The Telltale Series, voiced again by Dave Fennoy.
- Lucius Fox appears in Injustice 2, voiced again by Phil LaMarr.
- Lucius Fox appears in Batman: The Enemy Within, voiced again by Dave Fennoy.
- Lucius Fox appears in Gotham Knights, voiced by Peter Jay Fernandez. This version left Wayne Enterprises to start his own company, Foxteca.
- Lucius Fox appears in Batman: Arkham Shadow, voiced again by Dave Fennoy.
- Lucius Fox appears in Lego Batman: Legacy of the Dark Knight, voiced by Bruce Lester Johnson.

=== Podcasts ===
- Wayne Brady appears as Lucius Fox on WHO ME?, a Batman podcast hosted by Bobby Moynihan.

=== Miscellaneous ===
Lucius Fox appears in the Injustice 2 prequel comic.
