= Tamara Fox =

Tam Fox
- Tamara "Tam" Fox, as depicted in Red Robin #12 (May 2010). Art by Marcus To.

Publication information
- Publisher: DC Comics
- First appearance: Batman: Family #1 (December 2002)
- Created by: John Francis Moore (writer); Ramon Bachs (artist)

In-story information
- Full name: Tamara Fox
- Species: Human
- Supporting character of: Tim Drake
- Notable aliases: Foxy Lady

Tamara "Tam" Fox is a fictional character in the DC Comics Universe, specifically a supporting character in the Batman franchise. She first appeared in Batman: Family #1 (December 2002) and was created by John Francis Moore and Stefano Gaudiano.

== Publication history ==
The character first appeared as a teenager in Batman: Family #1 (December 2002), but made no further appearances for many years. The character was reintroduced in Red Robin, becoming a major supporting character in the title. Since her debut, she has also appeared in the main Batman title as well.

== Fictional character biography ==
The daughter of Bruce Wayne's close friend and business partner Lucius Fox, Tam first appeared at the start of the Batman: Reborn event, where she was tasked by her father with tracking down Bruce Wayne's adopted son Tim Drake. Shortly after locating Tim, Tam is abducted by members of the League of Assassins, and learns that Tim is secretly the vigilante Red Robin.

Upon returning to Gotham City with Drake in tow, Tam ends up being interviewed by Vicki Vale, a reporter who suspects that Tim is secretly Red Robin. During the interview, Tam attempts to throw off Vale's suspicions by claiming that she and Tim are engaged. Before the interview can conclude, both Tam and Vicki are attacked by the League of Assassins, who seek to kill Drake's friends and family. Both women are ultimately rescued by Batgirl. Following this, Tam's false engagement is published in the local paper, leading to much of Gotham to believe that Tam and Tim are a couple.

After this, Tam begins travelling across the globe with Tim in an effort to help establish a foundation called the Neon Knights, which exists to help at-risk teens. During a stop in Russia, Tam, Tim and a female vigilante named Promise end up trapped inside the Unternet, a virtual reality world created by the Secret Society of Super Villains. Inside the Unternet, Tam is transformed into an infant, but eventually learns to use the system to her advantage by turning herself into a blaxploitation-style heroine dubbed Foxy Lady, who helps Tim and the others escape.

Once back in the real world, Tam is shown bound and gagged by thugs working for the Sensei. Sensei threatens to kill Tam if Lucius does not agree to work with him, and fearing for his daughter's life, Lucius agrees. After Lucius gives up the information, Sensei orders his men to tie up Tam, her father and Batman, and then throw them into a river. Before they can drown, Batman frees himself and rescues the hostages.

Lucius is eventually killed by an Egyptian hitwoman known as the Scarab, leaving Tam distraught. After Tim reveals that Lucius' death was a ruse designed to allow Red Robin and Blackbat to defeat the group of assassins Scarab belonged to, Tam angrily breaks up with him.
