= Talon (comics) =

Comics character name

Talon, in comics, may refer to:

- Talon (Marvel Comics), a Marvel Comics character and member of the Guardians of the Galaxy of the Earth-691
- Talon (DC Comics), a DC Comics superhero and Earth-3 equivalent of Robin
- Talon, an assassin of the Court of Owls in DC Comics

It may also refer to:

- Black Talon (comics), a number of Marvel Comics characters

== See also ==
- Talon (disambiguation)
