= The Complete Book of Villains =

Dungeons & Dragons accessory

- Genre: Role-playing games
- Publisher: TSR

The Complete Book of Villains is an accessory for the 2nd edition of the Advanced Dungeons & Dragons fantasy role-playing game.

== Contents ==
The Complete Book of Villains covers villainous organizations, the role of henchmen, and the construction of intelligent adventures.

== Publication history ==
The Complete Book of Villains was written by Kirk Botula, and published by TSR, Inc.

== Reception ==
Rick Swan reviewed The Complete Book of Villains for Dragon magazine #213 (January 1995). He commented that: "Rather than serve up a collection of pre-rolled NPCs, this engaging source book shows how to create believable bad guys from the ground up." He complimented Botula on writing using "clear language and with plenty of examples". Swan concluded by saying: "Botula correctly asserts that motivations and objectives are more important than Strength scores and armor classes; in fact, the near-absence of statistics makes this an excellent reference for all fantasy RPGs, not just the AD&D game."

== Reviews ==
- Coleção Dragão Brasil
