= Clayface =

Fictional characters appearing in DC Comics

- Five of the then-six versions of Clayface, (Note: Missing Cassius "Clay" Payne, the child of Sondra and Preston, introduced in May 1994) as depicted in Batman Villains Secret Files & Origins #1 (October 1998). From top to bottom: Sondra Fuller, Matt Hagen, Peter Malley, Preston Payne, and Basil Karlo.

Publication information
- Publisher: DC Comics
- First appearance: (Karlo); Detective Comics #40 (June 1940) (Hagen); Detective Comics #298 (December 1961) (Preston Payne); Detective Comics #478 (August 1978) (Fuller); The Outsiders #21 (July 1987) (Cassius Payne); Batman: Shadow of the Bat #27 (May 1994) (Malley); Batman #550 (June 1997) (Russell); Catwoman #1 (July 2001) (Williams); Batman: Gotham Knights #60 (September 2004)
- Created by: (Karlo); Bill Finger; Bob Kane (Hagen); Bill Finger; Sheldon Moldoff (Preston Payne); Len Wein; Marshall Rogers (Fuller); Mike W. Barr; Jim Aparo (Cassius Payne); Alan Grant; Bret Blevins (Malley); Doug Moench; Kelley Jones (Russell); Ed Brubaker; Darwyn Cooke (Williams); A. J. Lieberman; Javier Pina

In-story information
- Alter ego: Basil "Baz" Karlo; Matthew "Matt" Hagen; Preston Payne; Sondra Fuller; Cassius "Clay" Payne; Peter Malley "Todd Russell"; Johnny Williams Annie Hagen; Chris Cassius; Ethan Bennett; Tanner Freyr; Virginia Devereaux
- Species: Metahuman
- Team affiliations: (Karlo); Secret Society of Super Villains; Injustice League; Batman Family (Hagen); Anti-Justice League (Fuller); Strike Force Kobra (All); Mud Pack
- Notable aliases: (Karlo); Ultimate Clayface; Clayface-Prime (Fuller); Lady Clay (Malley); Dr. Peter Malley; Clay-Thing
- Abilities: (All): Shapeshifting; Regeneration; Superhuman strength, stamina, and durability; (Karlo, Hagen, & Fuller): Power replication; (Preston Payne): Fatal touch; Genius-level intellect; Powered armor; (Cassius Payne): Bio-fission; (Malley): Death glare

Clayface is an alias used by several characters appearing in American comic books published by DC Comics. Most incarnations of the character possess clay-like bodies and shapeshifting abilities, and almost all of them are adversaries of the superhero Batman. In 2009, Clayface was ranked as IGN's 73rd-greatest comic book villain of all time.

Both a prominent enemy and ally of Batman, Clayface has appeared in various forms of non-comics media. In live-action, an unnamed version of the character appeared in the television series Birds of Prey, played by Kirk Baltz, the Basil Karlo version of the character appeared in Gotham, played by Brian McManamon, and an original version of the character named Virginia Devereaux appeared in Pennyworth, played by Lorraine Burroughs. The Matt Hagen incarnation of Clayface is the titular character of the 2026 DC Universe self-titled film, played by Tom Rhys Harries.

== Publication history ==
Created by Bill Finger and Bob Kane, the original Clayface, Basil Karlo, appeared in Detective Comics #40 (June 1940) as a B-list actor who began a life of crime using the identity of a villain that he had portrayed in a horror film. Kane stated that the character was partially inspired by the 1925 Lon Chaney version of Erik from The Phantom of the Opera and that the name Basil Karlo was derived from Boris Karloff and Basil Rathbone. The character only appeared twice in the Golden Age, but was the inspiration for the shapeshifting Silver Age version.

In the late 1950s, Batman began facing a series of science fiction-inspired foes, including Matthew Hagen, a treasure hunter who was given vast shapeshifting powers and resiliency by exposure to a pool of radioactive protoplasm and became the second Clayface. He retained the title for the next several decades of comic book history.

In the late 1970s, Preston Payne became the third Clayface. A scientist suffering from hyperpituitarism, Preston Payne used the second Clayface's blood to create a cure for his condition. While the shapeshifting was brief tenure, he then became a clay-like creature that needed to pass his new condition on to others to survive with his melting touch.

Sondra Fuller of Strike Force Kobra used the terrorist group's technology to become the fourth Clayface, also known as Lady Clay. She formed the Mud Pack with the original and third Clayfaces. During this era, the original Clayface used the DNA of Payne and Fuller to become the Ultimate Clayface (as he now called himself).

Sometime after the Mud Pack event, Payne and Fuller had a son named Cassius "Clay" Payne, who, as the fifth Clayface, also had metahuman shapeshifting powers.

In a 1997 storyline, Dr. Peter Malley later uses a sample of Cassius Payne's skin to become Clay-Thing.

The Todd Russell version of Clayface was introduced in Catwoman (vol. 3) #4 (July 2001), and the Johnny Williams version of Clayface was introduced in Batman: Gotham Knights #60 (September 2004).

== Fictional character biography ==
=== Basil Karlo ===
==== Golden Age ====
The original version of Clayface, Basil Karlo, first appeared in Detective Comics #40 (June 1940). He is a B-list actor who is driven insane when he hears that a remake of the classic horror film he had starred in, Dread Castle, would be shot without him acting in the film. Donning the costume of Clayface, a villain he once played in a different movie, he begins killing the actors playing characters he killed in the order and way they die in the film, along with someone who knew his identity. Last, he plans to murder the actor playing the Clayface killer. He is foiled by Batman and Robin.

He reappears after the prison ambulance he is riding in plunges off a cliff. He once again dons the mask of Clayface and targets Bruce Wayne's fiancée, Julie Madison. Once again, the Dynamic Duo foil his plans.

==== Silver Age ====
While Earth-One's version of Clayface has a similar history, he was only seen in a flashback as Alice Chilton reminiscences about Bruce Wayne's growth from when her son Joe Chill shot Thomas Wayne and Martha Wayne to his path to becoming Batman.

Clayface was killed by John Carlinger during his attack on Carlinger's yacht.

==== Post-Crisis ====
In post-Crisis continuity, Karlo languishes in a prison hospital, when the current Clayface (Sondra Fuller) visits him out of curiosity. Karlo proposes an alliance between all living Clayfaces to kill Batman and did an attempt to resurrect Matt Hagen. He even arranges for a small piece of the remains of Matt Hagen to be gathered to make him a post-mortem member of the "Mud Pack" as the group called itself. Even though the "Mud Pack" is defeated, Karlo injects himself with blood samples from Preston Payne and Sondra Fuller, gaining the abilities to shapeshift and melt with a touch; he becomes the self-declared "Ultimate Clayface". He is defeated by the combined efforts of Batman and Looker of the Outsiders by overloading his abilities, making him melt into the ground. He literally sinks into the Earth's crust when he loses control of his powers; he survives, however, and now his body sports crystals similar to quartz that endow him with greater power. Karlo escapes his underground prison when Gotham City is struck by a great cataclysm. He captures Batman and is about to kill him, but he gets into a feud with Mr. Freeze about who has a right to kill Batman. Using that distraction, Batman soundly defeats both of them.

In the 1999 "Batman: No Man's Land" storyline, Karlo holds Poison Ivy prisoner in Robinson Park. After she is freed from her prison by Batman, Ivy battles and defeats Karlo, sinking him deep into the ground. Clayface is apparently destroyed in this battle.

Later, he seeks to increase his already formidable powers by absorbing Wonder Woman (a clay construct similar to him), giving him an amount of powers that border on invulnerability. While he is successful in absorbing some of the heroine's powers, causing her to regress to a teenage appearance resembling Donna Troy, he is ultimately returned to normal when Wonder Woman and Donna trick Clayface into entering a train carriage with Wonder Woman while she was disguised as Donna, Donna subsequently using the Lasso of Truth to swing the carriage around and turn it into a mystical centrifuge, causing the clay Clayface had taken from Wonder Woman to split away from him and re-merge with Wonder Woman due to the differences between the two types of clay.

==== The New 52 ====
In 2011, DC rebooted its entirely monthly line of books, in an initiative called The New 52. Clayface's origin is retold in the Batman: The Dark Knight storyline "Clay". As a child, Basil Karlo came from a poor family. Hungry for fame and wealth, he studied acting but was never able to get anything better than low-profile roles and bit parts. Learning from a fellow actor that Penguin had access to a chemical formula that would make anyone a great actor, Karlo sought out the criminal and asked him for the formula; Penguin handed it over willingly as he had no use for it. Karlo discovered that he could effortlessly change his physical features with the formula, becoming whatever a role demanded, and very quickly attained a high level of success and fame.

Penguin was losing money due to a gang war and stole the formula back to sell it. Karlo eventually fell into a life of crime and slowly lost his sanity. When he tried at a comeback, he lashed out at a cast member and was fired. With his career over and reputation ruined, Karlo realized he had swapped DNA too much to hold his general form together, and gradually transformed into a massive clay creature, able to imitate any and all features except his own.

As a part of 2012's "Death of the Family" storyline, Poison Ivy breaks Karlo out of Arkham Asylum, claiming she wants to marry him. This turns out to be a ruse, however; Ivy is using him as part of a larger scheme. Upon realizing this, he seeks revenge. Karlo later returns with a new plan: to use his DNA-duplication abilities to impersonate Bruce Wayne and take control of Wayne Enterprises. He even guesses that Wayne is Batman's true identity. However, Batman plants false evidence to suggest that he anticipated Karlo's attempt to take his DNA and tricked him into taking a fake sample. Batman eventually stops Karlo by trapping him in a special cell that can only be unlocked with Karlo's original DNA, reasoning that he has changed too much for his original DNA to still exist.

==== DC Rebirth ====
In 2016, DC Comics implemented a relaunch of its books called DC Rebirth, which restored its continuity to a form much as it was prior to The New 52. Basil Karlo was reintroduced with an origin similar to that of Clayface's DC Animated Universe incarnation: a handsome young actor who was disfigured in a car accident. In a desperate bid to salvage his career, he begins abusing an industrial make-up chemical known as "Re-Nu" which, when combined with clay and putty, warps flesh into new shapes and forms; a secret he discovered from his father Vincent Karlo, a former special effects artist. However, the chemical is long out of production, and Karlo resorts to theft when he can no longer purchase it legally. Batman apprehends him during one such robbery, which reveals his secret to the world. Karlo's career is ruined, and his girlfriend Glory Griffin dumps him.

Batman attempts to get Karlo to testify against the creator of Re-Nu, Roland Daggett, but he refuses. Instead, he attempts to break into the warehouse where the police are holding his stolen stash of Re-Nu and absorbs too much of it through his skin, causing his flesh to become deformed and malleable with a clay-like consistency. Driven mad, he rampages on the set of the film he was fired from. Batman attempts to evacuate the set, but Clayface flings him off into the distance and begins massacring everyone in sight. As an added bit of revenge, Clayface disfigures Glory, who is working on the film as a production assistant, before Batman apprehends him. This incident leads Glory to become Mudface of the Victim Syndicate.

In the 2016 Batman story arc "Night of the Monster Men", the villainous Professor Hugo Strange uses a serum to transform living and dead human beings into monsters. Batman initially suspects Karlo, who has broken out of Arkham Asylum. Realizing Karlo needs treatment more than imprisonment, Batman asks him to join his team. Karlo agrees, and working with Batman, Nightwing, Batwoman, Orphan, and Spoiler helps to defeat Strange's monsters. The government agency A.R.G.U.S. creates a quarantine zone encompassing the neighborhood where the creature died, nicknaming it "Monstertown". A.R.G.U.S. consultant Victoria October, takes charge of "Monstertown", the area of Gotham City affected by Strange's serum. Clayface patrols the sewers beneath Monstertown, retrieving monsters who were created by leaking serum.

October offers to work on a means of returning Clayface to human form permanently. She asks him to stay in his monstrous form for as long as possible so she can chart the mental degradation he undergoes the longer he remains nonhuman. She also acts as his counselor when he despairs of a cure. October calls the Clayface persona a "fear response" that occurs when Karlo's mind abandons empathy and embraces anger. Batman has Clayface wear a high-technology forearm device (later replaced with a smaller wristband with a longer-lasting power source) that enables him to regain human form without using his powers—reducing the psychotic effect being Clayface has on Karlo. The device is not a cure, as the Clayface DNA consumes Karlo's human DNA whenever he is locked into human form. October gives him a "placebo" bracelet with messages from his close friend Cassandra Cain (Orphan), which helps him focus on retaining his sanity. After pushing past the twelve-hour mark, Clayface loses his sanity and attacks October. Orphan intervenes, saving her life by putting the real bracelet back on.

Victoria cares deeply for Karlo, and later calls him a "great friend". October expresses a desire to test her cure on a less serious case, and Karlo tells her of Glory Griffin. Karlo also tells Glory about the potential cure, although she refuses to forgive him for what he did to her. Later, with the cure close to being finished, Clayface is captured by Glory when the villain First Victim takes over Arkham Asylum and releases her. Glory removes Clayface's wrist controller, and he goes insane. (Note: Clayface himself destroys the device later in the same issue.) As Clayface rampages through Gotham to confront Batman, Batwoman obtains a weapon which can destabilize Karlo's molecular structure, killing him. During his attack on Old Wayne Tower, Karlo is accidentally doused with hundreds of gallons of psychoactive mud, worsening his insanity. (Note: Readers learn from a flashback featuring Tim Drake that Wayne Chemicals had collected hundreds of gallons of material from Clayface over the years. Drake placed this "mud" into a "mudroom", where the Batcomputer could cause it to take any form. The "mudroom" was used for battle training by Batman and his associates.) October attempts to cure Karlo, but the effect is only temporary, and Batwoman kills Karlo. Three days later, October cures Glory Griffin, saying she did so only for the sake of Basil Karlo.

Clayface did not die, however. Seven issues later, in Detective Comics #981, it is revealed that Karlo is still alive and retains his powers to some degree. For reasons unstated, October conspired with him to fake his death. Karlo leaves a message for Cassandra Cain and then allows October to take him out of Gotham City. (Note: Ian Cardona, writing for the website CBR, argues that Dr. October either found a way to resurrect Karlo, or lied about his death so that Karlo could avoid being returned to Arkham Asylum and find his way in the world without the Clayface emotional baggage following him.)

==== Infinite Frontier ====
Karlo puts together a Clayface gathering called the Fraternity of Mud at the restaurant Synesthesia. The gathering is accidentally crashed by Harley Quinn. When Karlo and the other Clayfaces swarm over Harley Quinn, they fall through the floor into a laboratory. When Harley Quinn uses formaldehyde on Clownface, the Clayfaces stop their attack.

=== Matt Hagen ===
Matt Hagen as Clayface on the cover of Detective Comics #298 (December 1961)

The second version of Clayface, Matthew "Matt" Hagen, first appeared in Detective Comics #298. A treasure hunter, Hagen finds a mysterious radioactive pool of protoplasm in a cave. Immersing himself in it by accident, he is transformed into a malleable clay-like form which could be shaped into almost anything he desires. This is only a temporary effect, however, requiring him to return to the pool periodically to maintain use of his powers. His criminal activities attract the attention of Batman and Robin. Batman discovers Clayface's weakness and defeats him.

Hagen later escapes from prison and decided to investigate the protoplasmic substance that turned him into Clayface so that he can find a way to prolong his powers. Clayface poses as wealthy civilians of Gotham to learn more about his criminal activities. Batman and Robin later confront Clayface at his hideout, using a combination of a freeze gun and the protoplasmic substance to defeat Clayface and return him to prison.

Hagen eventually breaks out of prison and uses the protoplasmic pool to become Clayface again. This time, Batman defeats Clayface by immersing himself in the protoplasm, with the resulting battle causing Batman to destroy the cave that contained the protoplasmic pool.

Clayface later appears as a member of Queen Bee's Anti-Justice League to capture the Justice League. They are defeated by the Justice League.

During the "Crisis on Infinite Earths" storyline, Matt Hagen is killed by one of the Anti-Monitor's Shadow Demons.

Hagen returned in the 2021 relaunch Infinite Frontier, where he is first seen escaping from Arkham Asylum until he is caught by Batman.

Hagen participates in Basil Karlo's Fraternity of Mud gathering and attacks Harley Quinn when she crashes the gathering.

=== Preston Payne ===
The third version of Clayface, Preston Payne, first appeared at the end of Detective Comics #477 before making his first full appearance in Detective Comics #478–479. Suffering from hyperpituitarism, Payne works at S.T.A.R. Labs-Gotham division searching for a cure. He obtains a sample of Matt Hagen's blood, and isolates an enzyme which he introduces into his own bloodstream. Although he is briefly able to shape his own appearance, this effect is short-lived: while on a date, his flesh begins to melt, and when he grabs his horrified girlfriend's arm, she completely dissolves into protoplasm. Payne builds an exoskeleton to support his body and contain his contagion, but he soon learns that he needs to transmit this dissolving contagion onto others to survive by touching them. During this time, his mental health starts to slip as he falls in love with a wax mannequin he names "Helena", thinking that she is the only woman who is immune to his touch.

During the "Mud Pack" storyline, Sondra Fuller, the fourth Clayface, begins masquerading as the superheroine Looker and visits Payne at Arkham. That same night, he gets into an argument with Helena and unintentionally knocks her head off. Believing that he has killed her, Payne goes on a rampage until he is subdued by guards. Fuller, who is still using Looker's appearance and powers, rescues him and influences him to follow Basil Karlo's commands. Karlo ultimately betrays Payne and Fuller and takes samples of both their blood to inject into himself. Payne finally breaks free of Fuller's control and is about to kill her when she admits how sorry she is for using him. The two, after escaping, fall in love and go on to live together while on the run, leading to Fuller becoming pregnant with their child, Cassius.

Payne next appears in the Justice League: Cry for Justice miniseries, having been coerced into working for Prometheus, who had threatened the life of his son. Prometheus had further mutated Payne, giving him back his old shapeshifting abilities, curing him of his contagion, and had him act as a decoy for the Justice League. When the ruse was discovered, an explosive device planted inside Payne's body detonates, killing him.

Following The New 52 reboot and the DC Rebirth relaunch, Payne is reintroduced in Infinite Frontier. He first appears where Nightwing and Red Hood find him impersonating Red Hood and Batman. Red Hood subdued Clayface with a freeze gun. Later at the kitchen at Lineker's restaurant, Nightwing and Red Hood use a freezer to interrogate him on why he impersonated Red Hood. Clayface states that Red Hood is the most violent of the Batman family. Red Hood intimidates Clayface on who hired him to impersonate Red Hood. Clayface states it was a dealer named Wolfgang Bylsma who already planning to depart on an airplane to the Maldives. After freezing and shattering Clayface, Red Hood asks Nightwing to help pick up the pieces so that the feds can retrieve him.

Payne participates in Basil Karlo's Fraternity of Mud gathering and attacks Harley Quinn when she crashes the gathering. The Clayfaces stop their attack when she uses formaldehyde on Clownface.

=== Sondra Fuller ===
The fourth version of Clayface, Sondra Fuller (also known as Lady Clay), first appeared in Outsiders #21. She is a member of Strike Force Kobra who is transformed into a shapeshifter by her employer Kobra's technologies. She agreed to going through with the process because she hates her own face. The process works and she becomes a member of Strike Force Kobra. Clayface possesses identical abilities to those of Matt Hagen, but they are permanent without the requirement for exposure to a source of protoplasm. She can additionally copy any special powers of the being she is mimicking. Clayface is defeated by the Outsiders, but got away.

Later, after the Mud Pack forms and battles Batman, Fuller falls in love with Preston Payne. After Clayface-Prime (Karlo) is defeated, Preston Payne and Sondra Fuller escape and get married while on the run, and they have a child named Cassius "Clay" Payne, a play on boxer Muhammad Ali's birth name. After Abattoir kidnaps the child, the couple get into a fight involving Azrael/Batman. Batman eventually defeated them both, and Fuller was put into custody.

Fuller appears in Doomsday Clock, where she claims that Kobra was not the person who gave her the powers of shapeshifting after all. Instead, she claims that her powers were the result of a government conspiracy to create superpowered beings. Her proclamation further adds to the global scandal known as the Supermen Theory, which suggests that the United States has been secretly creating superheroes and supervillains for an unknown/unstated purpose. Fuller accompanies Black Adam in his attack on the White House.

Fuller participates in Basil Karlo's Fraternity of Mud gathering and attacks Harley Quinn when she crashes the gathering. The Clayfaces stop their attack when she uses formaldehyde on Clownface. It is mentioned that she and Payne have separated.

=== Cassius "Clay" Payne ===
After the Mud Pack incident, Payne and Fuller escape and fall in love while on the run. They eventually have a child together named Cassius "Clay" Payne, who becomes the fifth version of Clayface and debuted in Batman #550. The boy is separated from his parents and held in a government laboratory. The name "Cassius" is a pun on "Cassius Clay", the birth name of boxer Muhammad Ali.

If a piece of him is separated from his body, it can grow a mind of its own, but it mostly thinks in an unstable form of what Cassius wants. If bonded with another human, it becomes a Clay-Thing; the piece can give that human Clayface-like abilities, such as becoming soft and malleable, being able to withstand bullets and other forms of harm, and could also manifest Payne's ability to melt objects; all this person would have to do to perform such an action is to think about it. Cassius finds it very painful and distressing to have pieces of himself taken, and will go to crazed lengths to recover them.

During the 2005–2006 miniseries Infinite Crisis, Cassius Payne resurfaces and joins Alexander Luthor Jr.'s Secret Society of Super Villains.

When Thomas Elliot attempted to give himself the shapeshifting abilities of the Clayfaces, he determined that Cassius is the only 'pure' Clayface in existence, as all others retain fragments of their former human DNA where Cassius is the only Clayface who was never human.

In an issue of Batman: Gotham Knights, Cassius is depicted as having the clay-like appearance of his mother and father, but can only stay in this form while awake.

Payne is among the members of the Injustice League and is among the villains seen in Salvation Run.

In Final Crisis, Clayface joins Libra's Secret Society of Super Villains. He triggers an explosion at the Daily Planet under Libra's orders when Lex Luthor orders Libra to do something that will draw Superman to them.

Following the "Final Crisis" storyline, Cassius attacks the National Guard on the roadblock, but when he was approached by General Immortus's team, he is able to recognize one of the team, Human Flame. Cassius attacks and blames him for Libra enslaving Earth. The Justice League arrives to end the fight as Human Flame and Immortus's team teleport away, leaving Cassius to be captured. After the League interrogates him, he is taken to some FBI vehicles, but the measures to contain him prove to be useless; Cassius escapes into the desert.

Cassius participates in Basil Karlo's Fraternity of Mud gathering and attacks Harley Quinn when she crashes the gathering. The Clayfaces stop their attack when she uses formaldehyde on Clownface.

=== Peter "Clay-Thing" Malley ===
The sixth version of Clayface, known as the Clay-Thing, also debuted in Batman #550. Clay-Thing is created when a skin sample from Cassius Payne comes to life and merges with D.E.O. scientist Peter Malley. He has the ability to melt objects simply by looking at them. Clay-Thing is destroyed when Cameron Chase turns his own powers against him, and his remains are stored at the D.E.O. headquarters.

=== "Todd Russell" ===
The seventh version of Clayface debuted in Catwoman (vol. 3) #1 (July 2001), but is not actually shown until Catwoman (vol. 3) #3 (August 2001). This character does not remember his true identity, but it is said that he resembles actor Todd Russell. Struggling with his memory loss, he used aliases such as Brian, Greg, and Todd. Having the power to change into virtually any shape and size, he preys upon prostitutes in Gotham's East End until Catwoman is able to contain his severed head inside of a freezer. There are very few background details given about this character's past. He was in the Army, suffered injuries, and was subsequently experimented on before losing most of his memory and discovering his new powers. After his capture, he is held captive and further experimented upon for almost two years at S.T.A.R. Labs in Gotham before being freed by Catwoman.

Russell participates in Basil Karlo's Fraternity of Mud gathering and attacks Harley Quinn when she crashes the gathering. The Clayfaces stop their attack when she uses formaldehyde on Clownface.

=== Johnny Williams ===
Johnny Williams as Clayface on the cover of Batman: Gotham Knights #69 (November 2005). Art by Claudio Castellini

The eighth version of Clayface, Johnny Williams, debuted in Batman: Gotham Knights #60 (September 2004). Williams is a former firefighter who is transformed into a clay-based creature after an explosion in a chemical plant. He first discovers his transformation after he accidentally kills a prostitute; horrified and stricken with guilt, he plans to commit suicide.

Before he can do so, he is approached by Hush and the Riddler, who tell him that the chemicals turned him into the latest Clayface. They begin to manipulate Williams, promising a cure if he does their bidding. This includes pretending to be Tommy Elliot (Hush's true identity) and Jason Todd to hurt Bruce Wayne.

Elliot also takes some samples from Williams to try and determine how he can duplicate the shapeshifting aspects of Clayface without losing his original form, also using these samples to infect Batman's ally Alfred Pennyworth with a virus that allows Hush to exert some degree of control over Alfred, forcing him to commit murder. Eventually, Williams realizes he is being manipulated and Hush will never help him after Hush tries to steal a sample of Cassius.

Knowing that he is going to die, Williams offers Batman assistance against Hush in exchange for protecting his family. He redeems himself by providing Batman with a sample of himself so that Batman can find a cure for the virus infecting Alfred. As he dies, he takes care to assume a final form whose fingerprints are an exceptionally close match to Alfred's, allowing Batman to clear Alfred of murder by making it appear that the forensics team made a mistake.

== Powers and abilities ==
Each of the Clayfaces have different powers, but they all share the ability to shapeshift.

- In his earliest appearances, Basil Karlo had no superpowers, but wore a clay mask. In later comics, his body is made out of mud upon taking the cell samples from Preston Payne and Sondra Fuller, thus enabling him to gain their powers combined. In The New 52, these are improved to a level, in which he can mimic the DNA of others.
- Matt Hagen has temporary shapeshifting, voice mimicry, and a malleable clay-like body, which allows him to manipulate his physical features at will. He must reimmerse himself in a pool of protoplasm that gave him his powers to recharge them every 48 hours or else he would regress back into his human form. Hagen later duplicated the protoplasm by scientific means, but only for five hours before needing to be renewed.
- Preston Payne originally had an amorphous physiology, yet ended up gaining the ability to melt people with his touch. He has immense strength from his anti-melting exoskeleton. Preston's metamorphic abilities were later restored by Prometheus.
- Sondra Fuller has powers identical to Hagen, but retains them permanently.
- Cassius "Clay" Payne possesses the combined powers of both his parents. If a piece of him is separated from his mass, it can develop its own consciousness and even "bond" with human hosts to transform them into "Clay-Things". Hush has noted that Cassius is essentially the only "pure" Clayface as the only one who was never human to begin with, all other Clayfaces retaining some aspect of their human DNA that prevents others simply taking samples to imitate their transformations.
- Peter Malley gained similar abilities to Payne, but is capable of dissolving people via eye contact.
- Both "Todd Russell" and Johnny Williams have shape-changing capabilities.

== Other characters named Clayface ==
=== John Carlinger ===
John Carlinger was a renowned actor and director who held a film exhibition aboard the yacht Varania III. Basil Karlo, the original Clayface, assaulted Carlinger with murderous intent because Carlinger neglected to "invite" him to the event, but Carlinger killed Karlo instead. Feeling threatened by a few actors attending the exhibition who were rumored to be demanding an audit of his production company's finances, Carlinger used Karlo's alter ego to mask his true identity and intentions when he gunned these actors down in cold blood. Batman deduced "Clayface's" true identity by the water-solubility of his makeup, revealing it to be a type of makeup used by modern actors instead of the greasepaint Karlo was more likely to use. Batman punched Carlinger's lights out and exposed his murder scheme.

Carlinger participates in Basil Karlo's Fraternity of Mud gathering and attacks Harley Quinn when she crashes the gathering. The Clayfaces stop their attack when she uses formaldehyde on Clownface.

=== The Clayface of Japan ===
The ninth version of Clayface, the Clayface of Japan, debuted in Batman Incorporated #6 (June 2011) as part of The New 52. Batman tasks Batman Japan (Jiro Osamu) to fight the Clayface of Japan about 2 1/2 months into his Batman Incorporated venture. Not much is known about this Clayface, except that he resembles all of the previous Clayfaces and seems to have their same set of powers. Presumably, this Clayface, as a rival to Osamu, is a native of Japan. Batman states that this Clayface is a newcomer, a samurai, and operates in or around Hokkaido.

=== Clayface clones ===
In The New 52, a villain named Jeffrey Bode makes several short-lived clones of Clayface.

=== Clownface ===
The being known as Clownface began as a stray piece of Clayface's body that became unattached and gained enough sentience to morph itself into a mute old man. This man was found and taken to Arkham Manor because of his unresponsiveness. Later, the Joker infected this portion of Clayface with Joker venom, transforming it into a separate entity dubbed Clownface.

Clownface participates in Basil Karlo's Fraternity of Mud gathering and attacks Harley Quinn when she crashes the gathering. The Clayfaces stop their attack when she uses formaldehyde on Clownface.

== Alternative versions ==
=== Absolute Batman ===
An alternate universe version of Basil Karlo / Clayface appears in Absolute Batman. This version is an experiment from Ark M, created by the Joker.

=== Batman: Earth One ===
An original, unidentified incarnation of Clayface appears in Batman: Earth One.

=== Batman: White Knight ===
An unidentified, alternate universe version of Clayface appears in Batman: White Knight.

=== Batman/Teenage Mutant Ninja Turtles ===
The Basil Karlo incarnation of Clayface, amalgamated with Rocksteady, makes a cameo appearance in Batman/Teenage Mutant Ninja Turtles.

=== Earth-9 ===
An alternate universe version of Clayface from Earth-9 appears in Tangent: Superman's Reign.

=== Flashpoint ===
An alternate universe version of Basil Karlo / Clayface appears in Flashpoint as a member of Deathstroke's pirate crew.

=== Gotham by Gaslight ===
A Gotham by Gaslight-inspired incarnation of Clayface appears in Convergence: Shazam! #2.

=== New Suicide Squad ===
An unidentified Clayface appears on an alternate cover for New Suicide Squad #10.

=== Super Powers! ===
The Matthew Hagen incarnation of Clayface appears in Super Powers! (vol. 4) #6.

== In other media ==
=== Television ===
==== Live-action ====
Clayface as he appears in Birds of Prey

- The Matt Hagen incarnation of Clayface appears in the opening credits of Batman, but was replaced in the show with False-Face (portrayed by Malachi Throne), who in the comic-book continuation Batman '66 is revealed to be Basil Karlo, who later becomes Clayface.
- The Cassius Clay Payne incarnation of Clayface appears in the Birds of Prey episode "Feat of Clay", portrayed by Kirk Baltz. This version is a sculptor who is inspired by other people's pain and gains his powers from a special formula created specifically for him by a crooked scientist. Sometime prior to the series, Payne was hired by the Joker to kill Catwoman, but was defeated and imprisoned in Arkham Asylum. In the present, his son Chris Cassius (portrayed by Ian Reed Kesler) takes the formula for himself and gains the ability to turn people into clay. Upon learning of what happened, Payne breaks out of Arkham to stop him despite running afoul of the Birds of Prey. Chris is eventually defeated by Helena Kyle while Payne turns himself in. Unlike the comic book version, Clay is part of his actual name instead of a nickname.
- The Basil Karlo incarnation of Clayface appears in Gotham, portrayed by Brian McManamon. This version is a deceased actor who was revived by Hugo Strange and Ethel Peabody using octopus DNA, which gave him the ability to alter his face to resemble anyone he wants.
- An original incarnation of Clayface appears in the third season of Pennyworth, portrayed by Lorraine Burroughs. This version is a P.W.E., an enhanced being who can alter her appearance to perfectly mimic someone else's, who poses as Virginia Devereaux, a high-ranking CIA official who travels with Patrick Wayne to England. Throughout her appearances, she has assumed the identities of Mary Pennyworth (portrayed by Dorothy Atkinson) and Martha Wayne (portrayed by Emma Paetz).

==== Animation ====
- The Matt Hagen incarnation of Clayface appears in The New Adventures of Batman, voiced by Lou Scheimer. This version takes a special potion that expires at midnight in order to shapeshift.
- Two incarnations of Clayface appear in The Batman.
  - Series original character Ethan Bennett (voiced by Steve Harris) is a GCPD detective partnered with Ellen Yin and was Bruce Wayne's best friend until being mutated by the Joker's mutagenic Joker Putty driving him crazy. Bennett battles Batman several times, gradually gaining control over his powers, before eventually choosing to reform and turn himself in. After learning Basil Karlo became his own version of Clayface, Bennett joins forces with Batman and Robin to defeat him, with Bennett restraining Karlo so Batman can administer an antidote to them. Re-imprisoned in Arkham, a cured Bennett plans on finishing his sentence and focusing on reforming himself. In a potential future depicted in the episode "Artifacts", Bennett is reinstated into the GCPD and becomes its Chief of Police.
  - Basil Karlo (voiced by Wallace Langham in "Clayfaces" and Lex Lang in "The Batman/Superman Story") is an untalented actor who breaks into Wayne Enterprises and drinks a refined Joker Putty sample. After being rejected once more, Karlo snaps and uses his new powers to attack the people who rejected him, realizing that becoming a supervillain will increase his popularity.
- A portrait of the Preston Payne incarnation of Clayface appears in the Batman: The Brave and the Bold episode "Joker: The Vile and the Villainous!".
- The Matt Hagen incarnation of Clayface appears in Young Justice, voiced by Nolan North. In the fourth season, Young Justice: Phantoms, Superman and Black Lightning consider him, among others, for reserve membership in the Justice League.
- The Matt Hagen incarnation of Clayface appears in Teen Titans Go!, voiced by Fred Tatasciore.
- The Basil Karlo incarnation of Clayface appears in Harley Quinn, voiced by Alan Tudyk, while Jonah Platt provides his singing voice. This version is stated to be a classically trained yet terrible actor who gained his abilities from a "terrible pottery accident" and is considered one of Gotham City's lesser villains. Additionally, his body parts can develop sentience if separated from him. Introduced in the episode "So, You Need a Crew?", Clayface works as a bartender until he is recruited into Harley Quinn's crew. As of the fourth season, he left the crew to become a Las Vegas performer.
  - Basil Karlo / Clayface appears in the Kite Man: Hell Yeah! episode "Sexiest Villain Alive, Hell Yeah!", voiced again by Tudyk.
- The Basil Karlo incarnation of Clayface appears in Suicide Squad Isekai, voiced by Jun Fukuyama in Japanese and Brandon Hearnsberger in English. This version is a member of the eponymous Suicide Squad whose human form resembles Michael Jackson.
- The Basil Karlo incarnation of Clayface appears in the Batman: Caped Crusader episode "...And Be a Villain", voiced by Dan Donohue. This version was typecast as villains due to his unique appearance, leading him to use an experimental serum to alter his face. After being rejected by fellow actor Yvonne Francis, he adopts a disfigured appearance and murders his co-stars along with the serum's creator until he is defeated by Batman; although defeated, Clayface escapes.
- The Matt Hagen incarnation of Clayface appears in the Batwheels episode "Clay Date", voiced by Chad Kroeger.
- The "Todd Russell" incarnation of Clayface appears in Bat-Fam, voiced by Kevin Michael Richardson. This version is African-American and used to work with Volcana.

===== DC Animated Universe =====
The Matt Hagen incarnation of Clayface, with elements of Basil Karlo, appears in series set in the DC Animated Universe (DCAU), voiced by Ron Perlman.

- First appearing in the Batman: The Animated Series two-part episode "Feat of Clay", this version is an actor who was previously disfigured in a horrible car accident. Corrupt businessman Roland Daggett gives him Renuyu, a beauty cream that restores his face and enables him to change it to that of another person's, but its effects prove temporary and addictive. Daggett hires Hagen to aid him in his criminal activities in exchange for more Renuyu, but Hagen eventually refuses to cooperate after a close call with Batman, leading to Daggett's men force-feeding him a large quantity of Renuyu that transforms him into Clayface. Following a failed attempt on Daggett's life and being defeated by Batman, Hagen goes into hiding. In the episode "Mudslide", Hagen steals an isotope from Wayne Biomedical Labs to stabilize himself when his body begins to deteriorate before seeing Stella Bates, a former medical adviser on one of his films who fell in love with him. Hagen is nearly restored, but Batman finds them and aborts the treatment. In the ensuing fight, Clayface falls off a cliff and into the ocean where he dissolves and is presumed dead.
- Hagen returns in The New Batman Adventures. Following a minor appearance in the pilot episode "Holiday Knights", the episode "Growing Pains" reveals that after falling into the ocean, his remains drifted near a pipe leaking chemicals into the ocean, restoring some of his strength. While recovering, he sent a portion of himself out as a scout in the form of a little girl named Annie Hagen (voiced by Francesca Marie Smith) away to see if it was safe for him to resurface, but she develops her own personality and encounters Robin, who falls in love with her. Hagen eventually poses as Annie's abusive father while committing robberies to make a living before recovering and cornering Robin and Annie, with the latter allowing herself to be reabsorbed to save him. An enraged Robin nearly kills Hagen, but Batman intervenes and Hagen is subsequently arrested and imprisoned in Arkham Asylum, charged with his daughter's murder.
- Hagen appears in the Justice League two-part episode "Secret Society". Sometime prior to the series, Morgan Edge captured Hagen until Gorilla Grodd's Secret Society frees him and adds him to their ranks. Having grown less aggressive and sociopathic, he is initially reluctant to join them until Grodd promises to help Hagen restore his human form while maintaining his shapeshifting powers. However, he and the Society are defeated by the Justice League.

=== Film ===
- The unidentified Flashpoint incarnation of Clayface appears in Justice League: The Flashpoint Paradox. Similarly to his comics counterpart, he is a member of Deathstroke's pirate crew who fights Aquaman's army until he is killed by Ocean Master.
- The Basil Karlo incarnation of Clayface appears in the Batman Unlimited series of films, voiced by Dave B. Mitchell.
  - First appearing in Batman Unlimited: Monster Mayhem, Clayface joins the Joker's gang of monsters to wreak havoc on Gotham City.
  - In Batman Unlimited: Mechs vs. Mutants, Mr. Freeze and the Penguin free Clayface, among other supervillains, from Arkham Asylum before the Penguin tasks Clayface with helping him betray Freeze and injects him with a serum that turns him into a lava monster. Freeze, Robin, the Flash, Man-Bat, and Nightwing subdue Clayface, but he is accidentally freed by a group of children and, having reverted to his original form, escapes into the sewers.
- The Basil Karlo incarnation of Clayface appears in The Lego Batman Movie, voiced by Kate Micucci.
- The Basil Karlo incarnation of Clayface appears in Scooby-Doo! & Batman: The Brave and the Bold, voiced by Kevin Michael Richardson. Sometime prior to the film, Clayface picked up a corrosive strain of bacteria that makes it harder for him to hold his shape and is offered a cure by the Riddler. In return, Clayface creates a clay decoy to impersonate the Riddler while he is disguised as the Question, and takes the form of the Crimson Cloak, the supposed ghost of scientist Leo Scarlett who wants revenge on Batman for failing to save him. As the Crimson Cloak, Clayface steals isotopes to recreate Professor Milo's teleportation device, which both Scarlett and the Riddler worked on, while also framing Batman and Mystery Inc. for the crimes to keep them distracted. Ultimately, Mystery Inc. deduce Crimson Cloak's identity and defeat Clayface.
- The Basil Karlo incarnation of Clayface appears in Batman: Hush. While operating as Hush, the Riddler brainwashes Clayface and has him impersonate his original identity. After Batman exposes him, Clayface attacks him, but is defeated by Batman and Commissioner Gordon.
- The Basil Karlo incarnation of Clayface makes a non-speaking cameo appearance in Injustice.

=== DC Universe ===
The Matt Hagen incarnation of Clayface appears in the DC Universe franchise.

- Hagen is introduced in the first season of Creature Commandos, voiced again by Alan Tudyk. He ambushes Rick Flag Sr. and Eric Frankenstein in Aisla MacPherson's house after posing as her on Princess Ilana Rostovic's behalf. Clayface was defeated by Eric using an electrical wire.
- Tom Rhys Harries portrayed Hagen in a self-titled film. This version is an actor whose face is disfigured by crime boss Markos Szabo for sleeping with his girlfriend. After undergoing an experimental nanite treatment under Dr. Caitlyn Corr that was intended to restore his face, Hagen gains the ability to alter his appearance and later shapeshift. He decides to seek revenge against Szabo and anyone else who ruining his life and career.

=== Video games ===
Clayface as he appears in The Adventures of Batman & Robin

- The Matt Hagen incarnation of Clayface appears in The Adventures of Batman & Robin, voiced again by Ron Perlman. In the Sega CD version, he serves as the final boss, takes on Rupert Thorne's likeness, and hires other villains to distract Batman and Robin from his operations. Once the Dynamic Duo discover Clayface, they fight and defeat him, after which Clayface falls into a river and dissolves. In the SNES version, Clayface appears in the final level and joins several supervillains in an attempt to defeat Batman.
- The Matt Hagen incarnation of Clayface appears as a boss in Batman: Rise of Sin Tzu, voiced again by Ron Perlman.
- The Basil Karlo incarnation of Clayface appears in DC Universe Online, voiced by Benjamin Jansen.
- The Basil Karlo, Matt Hagen, Preston Payne, and Sondra Fuller incarnations of Clayface appear as character summons in Scribblenauts Unmasked: A DC Comics Adventure.
- The Basil Karlo incarnation of Clayface appears as a boss in Gotham Knights, voiced by Brian Keane.
- The Matt Hagen incarnation of Clayface appears in Justice League: Cosmic Chaos, voiced again by Nolan North.

==== Lego Batman ====
The Basil Karlo incarnation of Clayface appears in the Lego Batman series.

- Karlo appears as the first boss of and a playable character in Lego Batman: The Videogame, voiced by Ogie Banks. This version is a lieutenant of the Riddler who resembles the DC Animated Universe incarnation of Matt Hagen / Clayface, who appears in the Nintendo DS version in place of Karlo.
- Karlo appears as a boss and unlockable playable character in Lego Batman 2: DC Super Heroes, voiced by Fred Tatasciore.
- Karlo appears as a boss in Lego Dimensions via The Lego Batman Movie DLC pack.
- Karlo appears as a playable character in Lego DC Super-Villains, voiced again by Fred Tatasciore. This version's design is inspired by the New 52 incarnation.

==== Batman: Arkham ====
The Basil Karlo incarnation of Clayface appears in the Batman: Arkham franchise, voiced by Rick D. Wasserman.

- In Batman: Arkham Asylum, he is imprisoned in the eponymous asylum within a reinforced glass cell and takes on various likenesses in an unsuccessful attempt at tricking Batman into freeing him.
- Clayface appears as the final boss of Batman: Arkham City. In-between games, he escaped Arkham Asylum by posing as asylum director Quincy Sharp and went on the run from Hugo Strange. Karlo was later found by the Joker, who hired the former to pose as him. Throughout the game, Karlo uses the Joker's likeness to distract Batman from the Joker's attempts to acquire a cure for the Titan formula, which is slowly killing the latter, before Karlo eventually reveals himself to fight Batman. Their fight takes them to a Lazarus chamber, where Batman pushes Clayface into a Lazarus Pit to prevent the Joker from using it to gain immortality.

=== Miscellaneous ===
- The DC Animated Universe incarnation of Matt Hagen / Clayface appears in The Batman Adventures.
- The Batman (1966) incarnation of False-Face appears in Batman '66 #23, in which his real name is revealed to be Basil Karlo and he obtains a shapeshifting formula that transforms him into Clayface.
- The Matt Hagen incarnation of Clayface appears in All-New Batman: The Brave and the Bold.
- The Young Justice incarnation of Matt Hagen / Clayface appears in the series' self-titled tie-in comic book series. In issue #12, it is revealed that this version was a member of the League of Shadows who romanced Talia al Ghul to gain access to a Lazarus Pit and heal his cancer. After learning of this, Talia takes revenge on him by locking him in it for months, which mutates him into Clayface. He attacks Talia, but is subdued by Ra's al Ghul and Sensei. Ra's then has Sensei take Clayface to Gotham to attack Batman, leading into his appearance in the animated series episode "Downtime".
  - The Young Justice incarnation of Matt Hagen / Clayface appears in the tie-in audio play "The Prize", which is set between the third and fourth seasons. By this time, he has reformed, changed his name to "Harlan Matthews", and become an employee at Will Harper's company, Bowhunter Security. While guarding a WayneTech shipment, Clayface is kidnapped by Task Force X, who attempt to bring him to Amanda Waller. Clayface is rescued by the Team and offered a spot in the Justice League by Aquaman, which he turns down in favor of continuing to work for Harper.
- The Basil Karlo incarnation of Clayface appears in the Injustice: Gods Among Us prequel comic.
- An original, female incarnation of Clayface named Mrs. Clayface appears in DC Super Hero Girls, voiced by Kevin Michael Richardson. She is married to an unidentified Clayface.
- The Batman: Arkham incarnation of Basil Karlo / Clayface appears in the Batman: Arkham Knight prequel comic. Following the events of Arkham City, Karlo was taken in by the GCPD, though he is unable to retake his original form due to his body being exposed to Lazarus particles. Additionally, samples of Karlo are used by several parties for their own ends, such as Simon Stagg for "Project: Meta" and Hush to hide his cosmetic surgery scars.
- An original incarnation of Clayface appears in the first issue of the Arrowverse comic miniseries Earth-Prime. A teenager named Tanner Freyr was pushed into mud containing a sample of Basil Karlo / Clayface by bullies, which transformed him into a new Clayface. Freyr takes revenge on his bullies until Batwoman defeats him using Mr. Freeze's liquid nitrogen. After being incarcerated in Arkham Asylum under heavy guard, Freyr is contacted by Magog, who breaks him out in exchange for an opportunity to take revenge on Batwoman.
- An unidentified Clayface makes a cameo appearance in DC Super Friends #15.
- Clayface appears as one of the main antagonists of the novel Batman: Resurrection which is set between the events of the two films Batman and Batman Returns. This version is Karlo Babić, is a struggling actor who goes by the stage name Basil Karlo and becomes deformed after being exposed to remnants of the Joker's Smylex chemicals.

== See also ==
- List of Batman family enemies
