= The Haunting of Molly Hartley =

- Theatrical release poster
- Directed by: Mickey Liddell
- Written by: Rebecca Sonnenshine; John Travis
- Produced by: Jennifer Hilton; Jerry P. Jacobs
- Starring: Haley Bennett; Chace Crawford; AnnaLynne McCord; Shannon Woodward; Shanna Collins; Ron Canada; Jake Weber
- Cinematography: Sharone Meir
- Edited by: Zene Baker
- Music by: James T. Sale
- Production company: Liddell Entertainment
- Distributed by: Freestyle Releasing
- Release date: October 31, 2008
- Running time: 85 minutes
- Country: United States
- Language: English
- Box office: $15.4 million

The Haunting of Molly Hartley is a 2008 American supernatural horror film written by John Travis and Rebecca Sonnenshine and directed by Mickey Liddell. It stars Haley Bennett, Chace Crawford, AnnaLynne McCord, and Jake Weber. The film received negative reviews and grossed $15.4 million.

== Plot ==
The film begins in 1997 with a teenage girl, Laurel Miller, going into the woods to meet her boyfriend Michael. He gives her an early birthday present, but her father shows up and demands she leave with him. As they drive home, Laurel tells him she will be marrying Michael as soon as she turns eighteen. He breaks down and apologizes to her, telling her he cannot let her turn 18, then purposely crashes their car. Seeing that she is not dead, he kills her with a broken piece of mirror, saying he could not let the darkness take her.

In the present day, 17-year-old Molly Hartley is stabbed in the chest by her deranged mother Jane with a pair of scissors. Although she survives, she is haunted in her dreams by the experience. She lives with her father Robert, and her mother is locked up in a mental ward. Her father enrolls Molly in a new school to help with the trauma and start a new life. However, as her eighteenth birthday approaches, Molly has continuing nightmares of her mother's attack. Joseph Young, one of her classmates, attempts to help her; however, she begins to display symptoms of the same psychosis that took control of her mother's life. Molly attends a party at Joseph's house, where his jealous ex-girlfriend tries to attack her. She breaks the girl's arm and leaves the party. She has another hallucination of her mother attacking her and has a panic attack. The next morning she apologizes to Joseph's ex, who says she knows what Molly is.

At home, Molly is cornered by her mother and discovers that she and others want to kill her in order to save her from a preordained life as a servant to Satan. It is revealed that Molly had died as the result of a miscarriage and her parents made a pact with the Devil to save her life. The terms of the agreement were such that the Hartleys would only have Molly until her eighteenth birthday, then she would belong to the Devil. After Jane is accidentally killed, and upon knocking her father out, Molly runs to seek salvation by accepting a baptism by Alexis, who tries to drown her. Alexis accidentally is knocked on her head, which kills her and Molly turns to Joseph for help, only to discover that he is one of them and has set her up.

Dr. Emerson arrives at Joseph's house and tells Molly she is also to be a servant of the devil. She says Molly can either kill her father to break the pact or submit. She tries to let her father live and avoid her fate by attempting suicide with a kitchen knife. This attempt is in vain because the clock has already struck midnight.

The film switches to a mental institution, where a doctor is talking to a woman dressed in black, later revealed to be a cold-hearted Molly. Molly's father has now been admitted to the institution; Molly smiles and says she will not speak to him, choosing to move on. She becomes valedictorian of her high school and dates Joseph. She is seen leaving her high school graduation with Joseph in a limousine, after being told by Dr. Emerson (disguised as the school guidance counselor) that they will "see her soon."

== Cast ==
- Haley Bennett as Molly Hartley
- Jake Weber as Robert Hartley
- Chace Crawford as Joseph Young
- Shannon Woodward as Leah
- Shanna Collins as Alexis White
- AnnaLynne McCord as Suzie Woods
- Marin Hinkle as Jane Hartley
- Nina Siemaszko as Dr. Amelia Emerson
- Josh Stewart as Mr. Draper
- Jessica Lowndes as Laurel Miller
- Randy Wayne as Michael
- Jamie McShane as Mr. Miller
- Ron Canada as Mr. Bennett
- Kevin Cooney as Dr. Donaldson
- Ross Thomas as Jock
- Charles Chun as Doctor
- John Newton as Mr. Young

== Soundtrack ==
Although a formal soundtrack was never released, the following songs were used in the film:

- "Preparedness" by The Bird and the Bee
- "I Don't Wanna" by Anna Waronker
- "Rain" by Bishop Allen
- "Post Man" by The Sammies
- "17" by X-Press 2
- "Falling Out" by The Sammies
- "U a Freak (Nasty Girl)" by Chingy
- "Mad Scientist" by Madison
- "Untouched and Intact" by The Honorary Title
- "Overwhelmed" by Keren DeBerg

== Release ==
The film was not screened for critics.

=== Home media ===
Originally independently released by Freestyle Releasing, all ancillary rights reverted to 20th Century Fox upon its DVD release on February 24, 2009, via Fox's home video division, since Fox holds rights to release Freestyle films on DVD. The film was released in Mexico on June 4, 2010, via Quality Films. The UK DVD was released on June 14, 2010.

== Reception ==
=== Box office ===
The Haunting of Molly Hartley opened theatrically on October 31, 2008, in 2,652 venues, earning $5,423,315 in its opening weekend, ranking number five and second among the weekend's new releases. The film ended its run on February 5, 2009, having grossed $13,559,812 in the domestic box office and $1,858,937 overseas for a worldwide total of $15,418,749.

=== Critical response ===
On the review aggregator website Rotten Tomatoes, 3% of 38 critics' reviews are positive, with an average rating of 3.1/10. The website's consensus reads: "The Haunting of Molly Hartley is a rather lifeless horror endeavor, with a pedestrian plot and few scares." Metacritic, which uses a weighted average, assigned the film a score of 28 out of 100, based on 10 critics, indicating "generally unfavorable" reviews.

Frank Scheck of The Hollywood Reporter called the film "a teen-oriented horror opus that wouldn't pass muster on the CW network." Keith Phipps of The A.V. Club gave the film a D+ and said, "It's a horror film better suited for skittish cats than humans." Nick Schager of Slant Magazine wrote, "Despite the suggestion of its title, Mickey Liddell's affront to scary cinema has not a single goosebump-worthy moment, but more egregious and infuriating is that it barely even strives to unnerve, save for a scant few jolting loud noises and the insufferable hushed chit-chat that plagues teenager Molly as she attempts to deal with the fact that her mother recently tried to stab her to death with a pair of scissors."

Claire Spellberg of Decider, reviewing the film in 2018, said, "The Haunting of Molly Hartley is the kind of movie you put on when you're in the mood to watch hot teenagers do batshit stuff and laugh openly about their ridiculous behavior. I would argue that that's the best kind of horror film — the kind that you half-watch with a group of people who truly appreciate the bizarre shit happening on the TV."

== Sequel ==
A sequel, The Exorcism of Molly Hartley, was released direct-to-DVD on October 9, 2015. The film, directed by Steven R. Monroe, stars Sarah Lind as Molly with a supporting cast of Devon Sawa, Gina Holden, and Peter MacNeill.
