= Hainsley Lloyd Bennett =

British actor

- Born: 31 May 1980 (age 46); Hammersmith, London, England
- Years active: 2008–present

Hainsley Lloyd Bennett (born 31 May 1980) is an English actor. He is best known for his role as Bazza in the Epix series Pennyworth (2019–2021).

== Early life ==
Bennett was born in Hammersmith, West London to Caribbean parents and grew up in Wembley, North West London. He attended Hammersmith College. He studied English and Psychology and then trained at the Questors Theatre.

== Career ==
Bennett made his television and feature film debuts with small roles in the BBC One medical soap opera Casualty in 2008 and the film London Boulevard in 2010, respectively. He played the titular Othello at the Drayton Arms in 2014, as well as the titular Evan Smith in the 2016 web series Kingdom of Evan. He also gained acclaim for his powerful performance in short film White Awake. He had a small recurring role as Dr Michael Osoba in the BBC One soap opera EastEnders. In 2018, Bennett appeared in the films CTRL and King of Crime, the latter of which had a theatrical release.

In 2019, Bennett began starring in the DC Universe series Pennyworth on Epix as posh Bajan playboy Deon "Bazza" Bashford, a main role Bennett played until the character's death in the second season. Bennett portrayed William Lee in the 2020 History Channel miniseries Washington. As of 2023 he has a role in the forthcoming season three of the Apple TV+ series Tehran as well as appearing in Idris Elba thriller Hijack for the same streaming service.

== Filmography ==
=== Film ===
Year	Title	Role	Notes
2009	Keep Up If You Can	Pete	Short film
2010	London Boulevard	Student	
2012	Ill Manors	Policeman	
2015	White Awake	Joshua	Short film
2018	This Sceptred Isle	Sgt Phillips	
2018	CTRL	Dru	
2018	King of Crime	Anthony Tully	Also known as Milk and Honey

=== Television ===
Year	Title	Role	Notes
2008, 2018	Casualty	Officer / Sal Faulks	3 episodes
2008	My Holiday Hostage Hell	Yudas	Episode: "West Papau"
2015–2017	EastEnders	Dr Michael Osoba	3 episodes
2016	Kingdom of Evan	Evan Smith	Web; lead role
2019	Catastrophe	Instructor	1 episode
2019–2021	Pennyworth	Deon "Bazza" Bashford	Main role (seasons 1–2)
2020	Washington	William Lee	Miniseries
2022	Get Ahead	Hamish Herrera	Miniseries
2023	Hijack	Police Constable	Episode: "Brace Brace Brace"
2026	VisionQuest	Tattooed Man	Episode: "Theseus"
TBA	Tehran	Nyakane	

=== Music videos ===
Song	Year	Artist	Notes
"Get to You"	2008	James Morrison	
"Every Now and Then"	2009	Noisettes	
"Noella (Be Nice)"	2018	Nat Ya	
