= A Desert =

2024 film directed by Joshua Erkman

- Film poster
- Directed by: Joshua Erkman
- Written by: Joshua Erkman; Bossi Baker
- Produced by: Yellow Veil Pictures
- Starring: David Yow; Kai Lennox; Sarah Lind
- Distributed by: Dark Sky Films
- Release date: June 7, 2024
- Running time: 103 minutes
- Country: United States
- Language: English

A Desert is a 2024 psychological horror film directed by Joshua Erkman (in his directorial debut), starring David Yow, Sarah Lind, and Kai Lennox.

== Premise ==
Alex, an itinerant photographer, drives through ghost towns, cemeteries, and motels throughout the Southwestern United States. He soon encounters two menacing strangers, Renny and Susie Q, after hearing them fighting in the motel room next to his.

== Cast ==
- David Yow as Harold Palladino
- Kai Lennox as Alex Clark
- Sarah Lind as Sam Clark
- Zachary Ray Sherman as Renny
- Ashley Smith as Susie Q
- Rob Zabrecky as The Director
- S.A. Griffin as Detective Simon
- Bill J. Stevens as Gus Jessop
- William Bookston as Motel Clerk
- Alexandra Ryan as Marianne

== Release ==
A Desert was released on June 7, 2024 as part of the Tribeca Festival.

=== Critical reception ===
On the review aggregator website Rotten Tomatoes, 83% of 40 critics' reviews are positive. The website's consensus reads: "A metatextual meditation on cinema made with inventive style, A Desert's cerebral frights are enough to satisfy anyone parched for thoughtful horror." On Metacritic, the film has a weighted average score of 64 out of 100 based on 11 critics, which the site labels as "generally favorable" reviews.

Bobby LePire of Film Threat praised the film's direction and cinematography, calling it "a solid neo-noir with excellent visuals, good characterizations, and fantastic acting." Leslie Felperin of The Guardian gave a mostly positive review, calling it "impressively creepy" with a "swoony and most bewitching" visual style. Simon Abrams, writing for RogerEbert.com, was less positive, commenting that "director Joshua Erkman shows promise throughout A Desert [...] but his movie’s unyielding scenario [...] makes it hard to want to hang around while thinly drawn characters vaguely establish the movie’s themes."
