= Sarah Lind =

Canadian actress (born 1982)

- Born: July 22, 1982 (age 44); Regina, Saskatchewan, Canada
- Occupation: Actress
- Years active: 1997–present
- Spouse: Tygh Runyan (m. 2008; div. 2020)

Sarah Lind (born July 22, 1982) is a Canadian actress. She is known for her starring roles on the television series Mentors, Edgemont, and True Justice.

== Early life ==
Lind was born in Regina, Saskatchewan to Jacqueline Rooney (née Clelland, previously Lind), a casting director.

== Career ==
Lind's first major role was as Dee Sampson on the 1998 Canadian teen fantasy television series Mentors, which aired on Family Channel. After Mentors she was cast as Jen MacMahon, one of the lead roles, on the 2000 CBC teen drama series Edgemont, a role which she played through all five seasons of the show.

In 2005, Lind appeared in the title role of Cody in the Canadian film Fetching Cody opposite Jay Baruchel, and played the lead, Rita, in the Canadian horror film Severed (also known as Severed: Forest of the Dead). The same year she appeared in the Canadian film A Simple Curve, and the television film Selling Innocence.

In 2011, Lind starred opposite Steven Seagal in the scripted crime television series True Justice, playing the role of Sarah Montgomery; she appeared in both seasons of the show. In 2015 she portrayed the title role of Molly Hartley in the direct-to-video sequel The Exorcism of Molly Hartley, taking over the role from Haley Bennett in the original film. In 2016, Lind played the lead in the television film Hidden Truth. In 2018 she appeared in the film Last Night (also known as Shattered Memories). In 2020 Lind began playing Zee Madieras, a doctor and medical examiner, in the Hallmark Movies & Mysteries series The Martha's Vineyard Mysteries based on the novels by Philip R. Craig.

== Personal life ==
Lind married Tygh Runyan in 2008. They divorced in 2020.

== Filmography ==
=== Film ===
Year	Title	Role	Notes
2002	Punch	Liz	
2003	A Problem with Fear	Nerd Girl	
2005	A Simple Curve	Erika	
2005	Fetching Cody	Cody	
2005	Severed	Rita	also known as Severed: Forest of the Dead
2007	The Assassination of Jesse James by the Coward Robert Ford	Bob's Girlfriend	
2008	Boot Camp	Girl	
2008	Mothers & Daughters	Store Clerk	
2008	Personal Effects	Annie	
2009	What Goes Up	Peggy Popoladopolous	
2009	A Gun to the Head	Audrey	
2010	A Night for Dying Tigers	Amanda	
2012	In No Particular Order	Ally	
2014	WolfCop	Jessica	
2015	Blackburn	Jade	
2015	The Exorcism of Molly Hartley	Molly Hartley	Direct-to-video film
2018	The Humanity Bureau	Rachel Weller	
2019	Cold Blood	Melody	also known as Cold Blood Legacy
2022	A Wounded Fawn	Meredith Tanning	
2024	The Curse of the Necklace	Laura Davis	
2024	A Desert	Sam Clark	
2025	Die My Love	Cheryl	

=== Television ===
Year	Title	Role	Notes
1997	The Lost Daughter	Young Laurie 14 years	Television film
1998	Honey, I Shrunk the Kids: The TV Show	Teen Mrs. McGann	Episode: "Honey, We're Young at Heart"
1998–2000	Mentors	Dee Sampson	Main role (seasons 1–2)
1999	First Wave	Dawn	Episode: "Playland"
2000	Incredible Story Studios	Story Actor	Episode: "The Grass Is Always Greener"
2001–2005	Edgemont	Jen MacMahon	Main role
2001	Wolf Lake	Sarah Hollander	Episode: "The Changing"
2002	The Dead Zone	Tammy Moe	Episode: "Enemy Mind"
2003	Dead Like Me	Stephanie	Episode: "The Bicycle Thief"
2004	Human Cargo	Edith	Television miniseries
2005	Five Days to Midnight	Art Major	Television miniseries
2005	Selling Innocence	Mia Sampson	Television film
2006	Smallville	Deputy Harris	Episode: "Lockdown"
2006	Blade: The Series	Isabella Van Sciver	Episode: "Angels & Demons"
2008	Psych	Ada	Episode: "Rob-a-Bye Baby"
2008	Reaper	Madame Ozera / Noreen	Episode: "Cancun"
2010–2012	True Justice	Detective Sarah Montgomery	Main role
2012	Arctic Air	Trudy	Episode: "Northern Lights"
2015	Mythos	Fairy Queen	Web series; episode: "Danse Macabre"
2015	Fargo	Marie	Episode: "Loplop"
2016	Hidden Truth	Jamie	Television film
2018	Taken	Nancy Clarke	Episode: "OPSEC"
2018	Shattered Memories	Joanna	Television film; also known as Last Night
2019	Fatal Friend Request	Taryn	Television film; also known as Recipe for Danger
2020	A Beautiful Place to Die: A Martha's Vineyard Mystery	Zee	Television film
2020	Riddled with Deceit: A Martha's Vineyard Mystery	Zee	Television film
2021	Ships in the Night: A Martha's Vineyard Mystery	Zee	Television film
2021	Poisoned in Paradise: A Martha's Vineyard Mystery	Zee	Television film
2021	The Great Christmas Switch	Kaelynn / Sophia	Television film
