= Ryan Fletcher =

Scottish actor (born 1983)

- Born: 1983 (age 42–43); Scotland
- Occupation: Actor

Ryan Fletcher (born 1983) is a Scottish actor.

== Early life ==
Fletcher grew up in Blantyre, born to Stevie and Lorna Fletcher.

== Career ==
Fletcher appeared in the stage show Black Watch for the National Theatre of Scotland (2007-8) and had a leading role in the show The Infamous Brothers Davenport. In 2015 he played Bill in Laurie Sansom's adaptation of Muriel Spark's novella The Driver's Seat for the stage. He has appeared on television in River City, Taggart, and Limmy's Show. He plays "Dave Boy" in the television production, Pennyworth, which premiered 28 July 2019, on Epix.
