= Selling Innocence =

2005 American television film

- Teleplay by: John Moffatt
- Story by: John Moffatt
- Directed by: Pierre Gang
- Starring: Mimi Rogers; J. R. Bourne; Sarah Lind; Tamara Hope
- Countries of origin: United States; Canada
- Original language: English

Production
- Running time: 88 min

Original release
- Network: CTV; Lifetime
- Release: July 2, 2005

Selling Innocence is a 2005 television film depicting the exploitation of teenagers on the internet. The film was a co-production among the Edmonton-based television production company ImagiNation, Montreal's Cite-Amerique, and CTV, for CTV's line of television films collectively known as the CTV Signature Series. The film's broadcast premiere was July 2, 2005, on CTV in Canada, and on Lifetime in the United States.

== Plot ==
Mia Sampson (Sarah Lind), an unpopular girl, is approached at the mall one day to become a model. Even though she thinks modeling is shallow, she thinks it will be a better way to earn money than working for a sushi restaurant and goes to the agency. She poses for photographs which are to be displayed on an Internet website for "members only," supposedly so she can be scouted for other modeling jobs. As Mia's membership begins to go up, she begins feeling uncomfortable and also receives disturbing messages from a subscriber known as Gabriel. However, she continues to take shots and even participates in live video chats with the gentlemen of the site. Too late, Mia realizes that she is working for a pornography site and goes to a group called webwatch to uncover the operation. However, since the agency isn't doing anything illegal, the police can't do anything.

Mia is disgusted and even though she has earned over 30,000 dollars, she quits, after finding out that a girl younger than her has been hired. Her boss, however, still has full legal rights to her photos and tells her he will keep the website up, as she is the site's most popular "model." He does offer, though, to take down the site if Mia will do a 15-minute live web show whose clients have offered a lot of money to see. Mia accepts, as a man at the webwatch station has told her that it will be the evidence the police need to take down the operation. Mia begins the show, but when the police don't show up she cannot bear to finish the show and runs to the webwatch station. The man at the webwatch station is enraged that she didn't finish; he is Gabriel. He tries to force her to finish the show for him privately while he records it, but Mia tries to escape. Luckily, Mia's mom and boyfriend show up as he is attacking her.

The film ends with Mia working at a fast food restaurant, her safety restored, the "agency" shut down, and Gabriel behind bars. However, the ending shot shows a teenage boy going through old photos that Mia had done that are still online – proving what her boss stated earlier in the film to her that, whether she quits or not, the girl she became will always be out there.

== Cast ==
- Mimi Rogers – Abby Sampson
- J. R. Bourne – Malcolm Lowe
- Sarah Lind – Mia Sampson
- Tamara Hope – Chelsea Burns
- Mike Lobel – Justin Johnson
- Joanne Kelly – Simone
- Fred Ewanuick – James
- Charisse Baker – Jen Wilson
- Alexz Johnson – Angel DeSousa
- Emma Paetz – Stephanie Walker
- Margherita Donato – Bridget
- Nicky Pugh – Naomi
- Patrick Gilmore – Karl
- Jonathan Lachlan-Stewart – Jock in Cafeteria
