= Pennyworth (TV series) =

American crime drama television series

- Also known as: Pennyworth: The Origin of Batman's Butler (season 3)
- Genre: Action; Crime drama; Thriller
- Based on: Alfred Pennyworth by Bill Finger & Jerry Robinson
- Developed by: Bruno Heller; Danny Cannon
- Showrunners: Bruno Heller; Danny Cannon
- Starring: Jack Bannon; Ben Aldridge; Hainsley Lloyd Bennett; Ryan Fletcher; Dorothy Atkinson; Ian Puleston-Davies; Paloma Faith; Jason Flemyng; Polly Walker; Emma Paetz; Ramon Tikaram; Harriet Slater; Edward Hogg; Jessye Romeo; James Purefoy; Simon Manyonda
- Composers: David E. Russo; Lorne Balfe
- Country of origin: United States
- Original language: English
- No. of seasons: 3
- No. of episodes: 30

Production
- Executive producers: Bruno Heller; Danny Cannon
- Running time: 47–71 minutes
- Production companies: Primrose Hill Productions; DC Entertainment; Warner Horizon Television (season 1); Warner Bros. Television (seasons 2–3)

Original release
- Network: Epix
- Release: July 28, 2019 – April 11, 2021
- Network: HBO Max
- Release: October 6 – November 24, 2022

Related
- Gotham

Pennyworth, marketed as Pennyworth: The Origin of Batman's Butler for its third season, is an American television series developed by Bruno Heller and Danny Cannon for Epix, based on the DC Comics character Alfred Pennyworth. Jack Bannon stars as Pennyworth, a younger version of the iteration of the character previously portrayed by Sean Pertwee in Heller's and Cannon's Fox series Gotham (2014–2019), with the series serving as a prequel to both Gotham and V for Vendetta, by Alan Moore, David Lloyd, and Tony Weare. Ben Aldridge, Hainsley Lloyd Bennett, Ryan Fletcher, Dorothy Atkinson, Emma Paetz, Paloma Faith, Polly Walker, James Purefoy, and Jason Flemyng also star.

The first season premiered on July 28, 2019 on Epix. The second season began filming in January 2020, but the filming was paused in March due to the COVID-19 pandemic. The second season premiered on December 13, 2020. In October 2021, it was announced that the series would premiere on HBO Max for its third season, although it would still continue to air on Epix in addition. The third season premiered on October 6, 2022, and concluded on November 24, 2022. In February 2023, the series was canceled after three seasons.

== Premise ==
Pennyworth explores the early life of the titular Wayne family butler, Alfred Pennyworth, a former British soldier of the Special Air Service (SAS), years before the events of Gotham. He forms his own security company in an alternate history London, which combines aspects of the mid-1960s with invented events and practices inspired by V for Vendetta, such as a modern civil war and televised public executions.

In the first two seasons, Alfred becomes a target of the fascist Raven Society, a group conspiring to take over the British government, working against them with American agents of the CIA-affiliated No Name League, Thomas Wayne and Martha Kane, the future parents of Bruce Wayne, to whom is born his older future-long-lost sister, Samantha Thomas Wayne, in the second-season finale.

== Cast and characters ==
=== Main ===
- Jack Bannon as Alfred Pennyworth, a former British SAS soldier who worked as a bouncer at an exclusive London club while starting up his own security firm, Pennyworth Security, and later runs his own club, The Delaney. The character was specifically developed from Michael Caine's portrayal of the character in The Dark Knight trilogy, directed by Christopher Nolan. Caine's portrayal includes a previous background as a member of the British SAS. Despite this, the character is a younger version of the iteration previously portrayed by Sean Pertwee in Gotham.
- Ben Aldridge as Thomas Wayne, a wealthy young American forensic accountant and doctor from Gotham City who is impressed with Alfred's skills and later hires him. Wayne was secretly an agent of the CIA, working undercover in the No Name League before returning to being a doctor. The character is a younger version of the iteration previously portrayed by Grayson McCouch in Gotham.
- Hainsley Lloyd Bennett as Deon "Bazza" Bashford (seasons 1–2), a playboy and longtime friend of Alfred who served with him in the army.
- Ryan Fletcher as Wallace "Daveboy" MacDougal, another longtime friend of Alfred who has a drinking problem and served with him in the army.
- Dorothy Atkinson as Mary Pennyworth, Alfred's mother who supports her son in his pursuits whilst remaining concerned for his safety.
  - Atkinson also portrays Virginia Devereaux (season 3), who uses Mary's appearance to trick the Waynes.
- Ian Puleston-Davies as Arthur Pennyworth (seasons 1–2), Alfred's father, who works as a butler. After his presumed death during an assassination attempt on the Queen, he is kept alive by a life-support wheelchair built by the Raven Union.
- Paloma Faith as Bet Sykes, a sadistic sociopath who initially works as an enforcer for the Raven Society and later a captain in the Raven Union. She becomes attached to Alfred's girlfriend Esme while holding her hostage. She eventually dies and becomes a P.W.E. (person with enhancements) when she is resurrected, giving her enhanced physical strength.
- Jason Flemyng as Lord James Harwood (seasons 1–2), the former leader of the Raven Society and later its successor the Raven Union, who is conspiring to take control of the British government.
- Polly Walker as Margaret "Peggy" Sykes, Bet's sister who is the matriarch of the Sykes family and one of Lancashire's most successful dominatrixes. She is also an enforcer for the Raven Society.
- Emma Paetz as Martha Wayne (née Kane), an American agent for the No Name League, and later its successor the English League, who hires Alfred to assist her on dangerous missions. She develops a crush on Alfred during their missions and a budding friendship with Thomas, later leading to a relationship with the latter and eventual marriage. She later gives birth to a daughter, Samantha Thomas Wayne, the future-long-lost sister of Bruce Wayne. The character is a younger version of the iteration previously portrayed by Brette Taylor in Gotham.
  - Paetz also portrays Virginia Devereaux (season 3), who uses Martha's appearance to trick Thomas and Alfred.
- Ramon Tikaram as Detective Inspector / Prime Minister Victor Aziz (seasons 2–3; recurring season 1), a high-ranking detective in the London Metropolitan Police, who later becomes the prime minister of the United Kingdom.
- Harriet Slater as Sandra Onslow (seasons 2–3; recurring season 1), the daughter of Sid Onslow and a bartender who is romantically interested in Alfred. She later becomes a professional singer at Alfred's club and is pregnant with his child.
- Edward Hogg as Colonel John Salt (seasons 2–3), a high-ranking officer in the Raven Union who develops the experimental chemical weapon, Stormcloud. He later becomes a P.W.E. after replacing parts of his body with cybernetic ones to keep himself alive.
- Jessye Romeo as Katie Browning (season 2), an art student whose life is changed by the Raven Union, who later develops a close relationship with Bet Sykes.
- James Purefoy as Captain Gulliver "Gully" Troy / Captain Blighty (seasons 2–3), Alfred's former SAS captain and the leader of a crew of criminals consisting of former soldiers. He later becomes the first P.W.E. and serves the government as the enhanced super-soldier Captain Blighty after consuming and merging with Stormcloud. Purefoy is billed as "special guest star" for the second season.
- Simon Manyonda as Lucius Fox (season 3; recurring season 2), a young scientist who works for the CIA to infiltrate the Raven Union, later becoming a member of the English League. The character is a younger version of the iteration previously portrayed by Chris Chalk in Gotham.

=== Recurring ===
- Emma Corrin as Esme Winikus (season 1), a nightclub dancer and aspiring actress who falls in love with Alfred.
- Richard Clothier as the Prime Minister of the United Kingdom (season 1), the Head of Government for the UK who works to keep the No Name League and the Raven Society in check.
- Ben Wiggins as "Spanish" (season 1), a SAS officer and friend of Alfred who died in combat. He appears to Alfred in flashbacks and hallucinations.
- Jessica Ellerby as the Queen of England (seasons 1–2), the head of state for England and later the leader of the English League.
- Saikat Ahamed as Mr. Chadley, the manager for Pennyworth Security and later Alfred's club.
- Danny Webb as John Ripper / The Ripper (seasons 1–2), a local crime lord based in Whitechapel and descendant of Jack the Ripper, who kills people for sport.
- Freddy Carter as Jason Ripper (season 1), John Ripper's nephew who works for his uncle's crime syndicate.
- Simon Day as Sid Onslow (seasons 1–2), Sandra Onslow's father and the landlord of the Severed Arms, a local pub frequented by Alfred, Daveboy, and Bazza.
- Jennie Goossens as Mrs. Spicer (season 1), Mr. Spicer's wife who serves Peggy Sykes.
- Steve Edwin as Mr. Spicer (season 1), Mrs. Spicer's husband who serves Peggy Sykes.
- Charlie Woodward as Captain John Curzon (season 1), a retired military Captain who has a personal vendetta against Alfred.
- Anna Chancellor as Dr. Frances Gaunt (seasons 1–2; guest season 3), a physician and the new leader of the Raven Society and later a high-ranking member of its successor, the Raven Union.
- Sarah Alexander as Undine Thwaite (season 1), the new leader of the No Name League.
- Jessica Claire as Vikki Dufrench (season 2), John Salt's mistress and a famous actress.
- Sharon Ballard as Ruby Carmichael (season 2), a high-ranking member of The English League.
- Sally Tatum as Miss Dixon (season 2; guest season 3), the secretary for the Raven Union. She later has a young daughter, Julie, who is "adopted" by Bet Sykes.
- Jessica De Gouw as Melanie Troy (season 2), Gulliver Troy's estranged wife who takes a liking to Alfred.
- Suzanne Boreel as Rita (season 2), a member of Gulliver's Troy's crew of criminals.
- Faisal Mohammed as Monty (season 2), a member of Troy's crew.
- Tristram Wymark as General Nelson Thursday (seasons 2–3), the commander-in-chief of the British Army and the Field Marshal for the Raven Union. He later becomes the leader of Level-7, a secret government operation that works to create and control P.W.E. in London.
- Lorraine Burroughs as Virginia Devereaux (season 3), a high-ranking CIA official who travels with Patrick Wayne to England. She is later revealed to be a P.W.E who can alter her appearance to copy someone else.
- Richard Dillane as Patrick Wayne (season 3), Thomas Wayne's father and the CEO of Wayne Enterprises.
- Paul Brightwell as Dr. Robert Glubb (season 3), a former employee of Wayne Enterprises and the creator of the psycho-kinetic drug, Lullaby State.
- Jayda Eyles as Samantha Thomas Wayne (season 3), the young daughter of Thomas and Martha Wayne. She is often cared for by Mary Pennyworth, who acts as her nanny.
- Tachia Newall as Jez (season 3), a P.W.E. who has a cybernetic arm with a mind of its own.
- Loreece Harrison as Celia (season 3), a P.W.E. whose eyes force others into a hypnotic trance, so she's forced to wear a pair of cybernetic goggles.
- Claudia Jolly as Sally Prufrock (season 3), a rich socialite who befriends Daveboy and is one of Francis' followers.
- Paul Kaye as Francis Foulkes (season 3), a flamboyant artist hoping to change the world by using the mind control drug Lullaby State in an attempt to control the minds of his followers, and later the population of London. A predecessor to V, he and his followers hide their identities behind Guy Fawkes masks.
- Oliver Ryan as Roger Hammond (season 3), a kind divorcee who meets Mary through a "Lonely Hearts" newspaper advert.

=== Guest ===
- Salóme Gunnarsdóttir as Patricia Wayne, Thomas Wayne's sister and an American socialite.
- Melissa Knatchbull as Clarissa Harwood (season 1), James Harwood's wife.
- Peter Guinness as General Malcolm (season 1), an honourable high-ranking officer in the British Army.
- Jonjo O'Neill as Aleister Crowley (seasons 1–2), a Satanist who hosts lavish parties for London's elite.
- Rosa Coduri as Sheri (season 2), a waitress at Alfred's club.
- Gretchen Egolf as Dallas (season 2), Thomas Wayne's superior in the CIA.
- Lee McQueen as Vic Dobson (season 2), a funfair traveller who frequents Alfred's club.
- Ed Sayer as Banjo (season 2), a member of Troy's crew.
- Amanda Dahl as Jessica Thistle (season 3), the missing daughter of Lord and Lady Thistle who is affected by the Lullaby State drug.
- Jing Lusi as Zahra Khin (season 3), the daughter of a prominent politician from the fictional island nation of Kalpoor and the leader of the separatist movement, the Kalpoor Freedom Party,
- David Yip as Zeya Khin (season 3), Zahra's father and a former politician from Kalpoor.
- Liran Nathan as Win (season 3), Head of Security to the Khins and member of the Kalpoor Freedom Party.
- Chi Lewis-Parry as Kevin / Blue Raven (season 3), a P.W.E. who is the Raven Union's attempt to create an enhanced super-soldier like Captain Blighty, and exhibits similar abilities.
- Alexis Rodney as Darren Thompson (season 3), a P.W.E. with electrokinesis powers.

== Episodes ==
Season	Episodes		Originally released		
Season	Episodes		First released	Last released	Network
1	10		July 28, 2019	September 29, 2019	Epix
2	10	4	December 13, 2020	December 27, 2020	Epix
2	10	6	March 7, 2021	April 11, 2021	Epix
3	10		October 6, 2022	November 24, 2022	HBO Max

=== Season 1 (2019) ===
No. overall	No. in season	Title	Directed by	Written by	Original release date
1	1	"Pilot"	Danny Cannon	Bruno Heller	July 28, 2019 (Note: The first episode was made available on July 21, 2019, to subscribers of Epix Now, and the second and third episodes on July 28, 2019.)
Former British SAS soldier Alfred Pennyworth becomes caught up in the conflict between American agent Thomas Wayne and the shadowy Raven Society.
2	2	"The Landlord's Daughter"	Danny Cannon	Bruno Heller	August 4, 2019
Alfred's side job as a security consultant brings him to the attention of local crime lord John Ripper.
3	3	"Martha Kane"	Bill Eagles	Bruno Heller	August 11, 2019
American No Name League agent Martha Kane hires Alfred to assist her on a dangerous mission.
4	4	"Lady Penelope"	China Moo-Young	Bruno Heller	August 11, 2019
Martha enlists Alfred to help get the name of the new leader of the Raven Society. The episode title refers to British mid-1960s Thunderbirds television series character Lady Penelope Creighton-Ward.
5	5	"Shirley Bassey"	Rob Bailey	Bruno Heller	August 18, 2019
In the wake of Esme's murder, Alfred is slowly pulled out of his depression by Ripper, who insists that an enemy of Alfred killed her. The episode title refers to 1960s British singer Shirley Bassey.
6	6	"Cilla Black"	Bill Eagles	Bruno Heller	August 25, 2019
Ripper sends Alfred to a witch who gives him clues to find Esme's killer. Lord Harwood's memory returns. The episode title refers to 1960s British singer Cilla Black.
7	7	"Julie Christie"	Clare Kilner	Seth Sinclair	September 8, 2019
While Thomas and Martha visit Crowley's mansion seeking Patricia, Alfred closes in on Esme's killer, Captain Curzon. Arthur Pennyworth actively participates at a Raven Society meeting. The episode title refers to 1960s British actress Julie Christie.
8	8	"Sandie Shaw"	Jon East	Danny Cannon	September 15, 2019
As Alfred hunts down Curzon with help from Bet, Lord Harwood plots his return to power. The episode title refers to 1960s British singer Sandie Shaw.
9	9	"Alma Cogan"	Rob Bailey	Bruno Heller	September 22, 2019
Alfred is offered a way out of prison as the Prime Minister plots against both the Raven Society and the No Name League. The episode title refers to 1960s British singer Alma Cogan.
10	10	"Marianne Faithfull"	Danny Cannon	Bruno Heller	September 29, 2019
While Lord Harwood stages a coup, Alfred, Bazza, and Dave Boy help Thomas and Martha rescue the Queen from the Sykes sisters. Lord Harwood, Francis Gaunt, and the Sykes are arrested. Alfred is pardoned, but finds himself trying to stop his father from assassinating the Queen and Prime Minister. The episode title refers to 1960s British singer Marianne Faithfull.

=== Season 2 (2020–21) ===
No. overall	No. in season	Title	Directed by	Written by	Original release date
Part 1
11	1	"The Heavy Crown"	Danny Cannon	Bruno Heller	December 13, 2020
Several months passed since the last season. Lord Harwood escaped and his Raven Union has the British Army's backing, having taken over most of the UK. The Queen and what remain of the League are besieged in London. Alfred runs a bar and does side jobs for both sides, being paid by Aziz — now a League council member — to kidnap Salt, a supposedly minor Raven Union functionary. He is collecting money to leave the country for the US. Meanwhile, Martha Kane has risen to lieutenant position in the League, and meets with a returning Thomas Wayne, now named CIA section leader, who tells her that the US will remain neutral in the conflict, and that he is engaged to be married. Bet Sykes now works as a captain in an interrogation center of the Raven Union, and unhappy with her job, kills her superior and escapes with an art student prisoner. Salt is sprung from Aziz's team by Gully, Alfred's old SAS captain, and is revealed to have been working with him. It is also shown that Salt is working on project Stormcloud, a poison gas weapon.
12	2	"The Burning Bridge"	Danny Cannon	Bruno Heller	December 20, 2020
The CIA tasks Thomas Wayne to find dirt on Archbishop Potter, as he is an open opponent of nuclear warfare. He meets with Aleister Crowley who agrees to ruin the Archbishop's reputation for a kiss. Alfred and his friends get ready to leave the country with the money they accumulated. Alfie feels conflicted over leaving Sandra behind and gets into arguments with his mum, who wants to stay. Mrs. Gaunt learns about Stormcloud and seemingly talks Harwood out of using the poison gas. Amateur criminals kidnap Alfred's mother on the behest of a masked "Mr X" in return for the money, but it is revealed it was Lt. Aziz who set up the whole thing and shows up as Alfred frees his mum, resulting in the kidnappers getting away with the money. Meanwhile, Bet and Katie stay in hiding as Bet realizes she cannot contact Lord Harwood.
13	3	"The Belt and Welt"	Rob Bailey	Jimmy Dowdall	December 27, 2020
Alfred starts thinking that it was Captain Gully who stole their money. He confronts Gully, who swears that it was not him. Meanwhile, Crowley seduces the Archbishop to the ways of the flesh and releases photos of him involved in an orgy, which causes Potter to resign and commit suicide. Martha realizes that it was Thomas who hired Crowley. Bet and Katie take refuge at the home of a teacher of the latter, and Bet talks to Lord Harwood. Harwood orders Salt to bring back Bet alive, but Salt's policemen open fire at the house. Daveboy realizes that he once drunkenly bragged to someone about the money. Alfred notices a 500£ ring on the finger of one of his waitresses, Sheri. Vic Dobson, a small time crook, gave her the ring. They track Vic to his home at the carnival caravan, and he and Alfred fight. Alfred mortally wounds him in self defense. Sheri grabs the money and tries to escape in a car, but drives into fuel barrels, with the explosion killing her and destroying the money. Mortally wounded by the explosion, Bazza makes Alfred and Daveboy swear to not give up and reach America.
14	4	"The Hunted Fox"	Rob Bailey	Seth Sinclair	December 27, 2020
At Bazza's funeral, Gully Troy convinces Alfred to do a robbery with him. Thomas asks for Martha's help as his sister Patricia is attracted to a seductive fashion designer, who proposes to her at a party. Meanwhile, Bet Sykes and Katie smuggle themselves into London and find Bet's sister, who runs an S&M sex toy shop. Aziz gets elected as prime minister. Alfred and Troy rob hidden gold from the Lord Mayor's coach. Alfred later sees Troy abuse his wife and confronts him, but then agrees to do one last job with him. Alfred secretly kisses Mrs. Troy. Thomas and Martha prove to Patricia the designer's infidelity, and Patricia terminates the engagement. Thomas and Martha reconcile and have sex. Lord Harwood shows signs of mental imbalance, starting to consider using the poison gas, and is shown to be medicated by Salt. Salt suggests to Mrs. Gaunt to try to begin peace talks with Aziz. At a demonstration of Stormcloud, The Raven leadership is shown how capable it is of killing prisoners. Unknowingly, they are being filmed by Lucius Fox.
Part 2
15	5	"The Bleeding Heart"	Jon East	Hannah Boschi	March 7, 2021
Mrs. Gaunt meets with Prime Minister Aziz and warns him in vain to surrender or risk Stormcloud being deployed in London. Salt tells Lord Harwood about Gaunt's secret meeting, who, no longer trusting her, has her imprisoned. Martha and Thomas deepen their relationship, while Thomas receives a message from Lucius Fox asking to be extracted. Katie learns all the terrible things Bet has done, but still decides to stick by her and try to help her change. Alfred learns from Thomas that the tickets to America cost more than he assumed, making it necessary for them to work with Gully Troy again. They plan to rob a fixed wrestling match and make off with the winnings, however due to the fighters getting into a squabble, the match ends sooner than expected. An unmasked Banjo, one of Gully's men, kills several civilians in the chaos following the explosion heard from the safe being blown up. Alfred's mother realizes where he got the money from and expels him from her house. Alfred gives in to the advances of Gully's wife, Melanie, and they have sex. Meanwhile, Gully takes Banjo to the woods and executes him.
16	6	"The Rose and Thorn"	Jon East	Bruno Heller	March 14, 2021
Alfred buys three tickets to America from the money gained in the robbery and breaks up with Sandra. Prime Minister Aziz and the Queen recruit him for one last job against his will by blackmailing him with their knowledge that he had a fling with Melanie (Mrs. Gully). Alfred, Daveboy and Martha spring Lucius Fox from the Raven Union. Alfred's mum reconciles with him and agrees to accompany him to America, if he abstains from further violence there. Lucius tells Thomas that Stormcloud is ready within a week and could kill everyone in London via a fear-induced chemical attack. Thomas warns CIA upper management. Meanwhile, Aziz manipulates Ripper (who wants his position) and Aleister Crowley against each other. Ripper eventually confronts Crowley to threaten him, but ends up being drugged and institutionalized as he has hallucinations and cannot tell fantasy from reality. In the Raven Union, Salt manipulates an eager young lieutenant to speak up for Mrs. Gaunt, while also further drugging and manipulating Harwood, who makes him a baronet and names him chief advisor. Harwood eventually has a mental breakdown, beats the lieutenant to death, and is locked up, allowing Salt to take over.
17	7	"The Bloody Mary"	Catherine Morshead	Jimmy Dowdall	March 21, 2021
The CIA forbids Thomas and Lucius to alert the League about Stormcloud — as long as the US government does not know about a chemical weapon, they will not intervene and they want the conflict resolved quickly. Against their orders, they go to Martha and give the footage to Aziz, both of them deciding to stay in England. Thomas decides to go to medical school. Meanwhile, Alfred is approached by Gully with a job offer, but declines. Gully, suspicious of him, attacks Melanie and tries to kill her, but she wounds him and escapes to Alfred. He buys her a ticket as well, but in the end decides to stay in England and fight, his mother and Daveboy staying with him. Melanie boards the plane to America with Patricia Wayne. In Harwood manor, Bet and Peg Sykes overpower the guards and try to rescue Lord Harwood, but get surrounded by the army. Realizing that with him dead, Salt will not have the legitimacy to lead the Raven Union, Lord Harwood pretends he wants to surrender to Salt directly, but then draws his weapon on him calling him a traitor and gets shot dead, distracting the army for the Sykes sisters to escape.
18	8	"The Hangman's Noose"	Catherine Morshead	Seth Sinclair	March 28, 2021
After Lord Harwood's funeral in London, Salt demands the unconditional surrender of the Queen, threatening to unleash Stormcloud. Martha tells Thomas that she is pregnant with his child, but refuses when he wishes to marry her. Bet and Peg kidnap Vikki, Salt's mistress, but Katie talks Bet out of hurting her. Alfred goes to visit Gully and resolve things, but his gang ambushes him. Gully leads Alfred to the woods, stabs him then hunts him. While wounded, Alfred gets the upper hand after creating a trap from branches, however he refuses to kill Gully. Delirious from his wound, he swears to an apparition of Bazza that he wants to make a difference and serve a higher purpose. Daveboy and Mrs. Pennyworth arrive and save Alfred. Meanwhile, the Raven Union high council elects Salt as Chancellor, and it is revealed that Alfred's father is alive, bound to a life-support wheelchair.
19	9	"Paradise Lost"	Rob Bailey	Hannah Boschi	April 4, 2021
Thomas, Martha and Lucius approach Alfred for assistance in breaking into the Raven Union to steal Stormcloud much to Mrs. Pennyworth's disapproval. Alfred finds Sandra and makes love with her before embarking on the mission. Martha seemingly agrees to Thomas's proposal of marriage. Bet and Peg force Vikki to arrange a meeting with Salt. Alfred manages to secure Stormcloud and escape but not before Salt captures them. Salt sends Mr. Pennyworth to talk with Alfred to his disbelief. Alfred refuses his offer to join the Raven Union. Meanwhile, Bet and Peg locate and free Mrs. Gaunt. While escaping, Bet runs into Alfred and releases them before parting ways. Alfred and the team fail to escape and get trapped again. Salt grants Mr. Pennyworth another chance to persuade Alfred to join the Union. Mr. Pennyworth betrays the Union as Alfred kills the guards and they steal Stormcloud before leaving the Raven Union compound. On the way out, Alfred calls Aziz to inform him about their success.
20	10	"The Lion and Lamb"	Rob Bailey	Bruno Heller	April 11, 2021
Mrs. Pennyworth learns her husband is still alive. While everyone celebrates at the League HQ, Gully storms in looking for Alfred and accidentally breaks the capsule, revealing it to be inactive. Salt reveals Stormcloud is already in London and arrests General Thursday, intending to detonate it despite the League's surrender. Martha says yes to Thomas and Aziz marries them on the spot. Having second thoughts about letting his family die for his cause, Mr Pennyworth tells Alfred Stormcloud was smuggled into London inside Lord Harwood's coffin. Alfred and Daveboy locate the bomb and Lucius tries to deactivate it. Meanwhile, Salt is attacked by the Sykes sisters in his penthouse and beaten up, but manages to get the detonator and trigger it. Alfred offers to swallow the capsule, but Gully volunteers — the detonation is averted, but he turns blue and dies. Mr Pennyworth says goodbye to his wife and then unplugs his life support to pass away. Six months later, the New Raven Alliance, led by Frances Gaunt, assaults London, while Martha gives birth to a baby girl. Alfred leads the counterattack with Daveboy, Bet and Katie, and are joined by a revived Gully, who now has life-draining powers.

=== Season 3 (2022) ===
No. overall	No. in season	Title	Directed by	Written by	Original release date
21	1	"Well to Do"	Rob Bailey	Bruno Heller	October 6, 2022
With the powers of Gully, now called Captain Blighty, the League wins the civil war. Five years later, Alfred's security agency has expanded (including Daveboy and Bet Sykes), and new people with powers emerge, whom they capture for MI5 Science branch. Samantha, Thomas and Martha's 5-year old daughter, is babysat by Mrs. Pennyworth. A nuclear crisis between Russia and the US has just been averted (where Kyiv and Miami have been destroyed). Aziz is still prime minister of England. A doctor slashes the throat of a man with a scalpel and flees. MI5 identifies the man as a CIA agent, but the Americans do not come forward. Jessica Thistle, a young woman, runs away from home, and her nanny hires Alfred to look for her. In the ashram of drug dealer Sister Susie, they find Jessica and return her to her parents. Meanwhile, Patrick Wayne, Thomas's father, whom he has not seen in years, shows up to reconnect with his family, alongside his girlfriend Virginia Devereaux. Bet Sykes is still on the trail of John Salt, who escaped from prison and is missing. She tracks down a former Raven leader and takes her and her husband hostage in their home. When they resist, she kills them and takes their baby, also finding a ledger with coded messages. The next day, Patrick asks for Thomas' help in locating Doctor Glubb, a Waynetech employee who ran away with priceless company secrets. Patrick asks for Martha's help, revealing to Thomas that she is on active MI5 duty. Virginia chastises Patrick and threatens him to use more direct methods. When receiving a call that "the girl is in position", she gives the order to go ahead. The next morning, Jessica kills her parents with a knife, then in a daze, walks to Alfred's home and collapses in the door. The episode title refers to the thoroughbred racehorse Well To Do.
22	2	"Many Clouds"	Rob Bailey	John Stephens	October 6, 2022
Aziz questions Alfred about the murder, and it is revealed the nanny who hired him was a fake. Thomas asks Alfred to work for Patrick and find Glubb. Glubb created psychotropic drugs for the CIA as part of Operation Lullaby State, which is developing mind control. While watching over the comatose Jessica in the hospital, Daveboy confronts and kills a CIA agent who was trying to kidnap her. The fake nanny, a hired actress, visits Alfred's agency, having been stabbed en route, revealing that Americans hired her. Alfred and Daveboy move Jessica to the penthouse of Sandra, who is now a famous pop singer, for safekeeping. Mrs. P. answers an advertisement in the papers seeking companionship, but leaves insulted when the man suggests that they go to a hotel to have sex. Following up a clue about incense on the dead CIA agent's clothes, Martha infiltrates Sister Susie's ashram and questions her. Sister Susie says that the CIA paid her to help run drug tests on her commune, but never saw any results. CIA agents show up and kill Sister Susie, but Alfred and Daveboy shoot them before they can kill Martha, who finds a hidden Waynetech camera. Martha and Alfred realize that Jessica killed her parents under the influence of Glubb's drugs, and something was used to trigger her. Meanwhile, when one of Sandra's songs is played at her flat, Jessica goes into a trance and starts to kill the partying people with a knife. Before she can kill Sandra, Daveboy shoots Jessica. The episode title refers to the thoroughbred racehorse Many Clouds.
23	3	"Comply or Die"	Jon East	Robert Hull	October 6, 2022
Lucius Fox, now working for MI5's science branch, visits the people with special abilities kept below the fake MI5 front. Gully escapes using Fox to open the elevator for him with the retinal scanner. MI5 contacts Alfred to bring him back. Thomas talks to Patrick, who is alerted to Martha knowing about the CIA's involvement in Operation Lullaby State. Feeling responsible for Jessica's death, Daveboy attends her funeral, causing a scene when trying to make a speech while drunk, but impressing an attending Sally Prufrock. Alfred finds Gully in a betting shop, mollifies him and disables him with a killswitch on the back of his armor. However, the patrons, angry at losing a bet, attack them to try and sell Gully's armor. Lucius arrives, giving Alfred the time to disarm them. Gully reveals that he is still in love with Melanie, and wants to escape and find her. Alfred finds out that his mum lied to him and went on a date. While at a playground with Mrs. P. and Samantha, Martha is approached by Glubb. Glubb says that he wants to work for MI5 in return for money and protection from the Americans. He tried to make the same deal with the Thistles, who were murdered before he could complete it. Before leaving to escape the CIA, he warns Martha that Patrick is not the one she should worry about. Virginia, revealed to be a CIA agent, sees Martha leaving and authorizes an operation to tie up loose ends. She drugs Thomas, whom operatives carry away, to the impotent protests of Patrick. Alfred visits Sandra and comforts her. Thomas returns seemingly unaware of anything happening, however during dinner he gets a call that starts playing Sandra's song to him. Thomas hallucinates that Martha is a sadistic prison warden, and stabs her. Before he can kill her, Mrs. P. knocks him out . The episode title refers to the thoroughbred racehorse Comply or Die.
24	4	"Silver Birch"	Jon East	Hannah Boschi	October 13, 2022
Thomas is arrested and imprisoned in the Tower of London, while Martha undergoes surgery to save her life. Patrick hires Alfred to break Thomas out and send him back to the US, without Virginia's knowledge, offering to pay a million pounds. Glubb, unable to make contact with Martha, is offered a deal by someone via a phone booth. Using a grappling hook gun and automatic lockpick developed by Lucius, Alfred and Daveboy break Thomas out of the Tower, becoming fugitives, but Aziz intercedes so that no charges are pressed. Daveboy attends a gallery exhibition at Sally's request, with whom he had sex, meeting artist Francis Foulkes. Alfred takes Thomas to his home, disrupting a date his mum was having. As Thomas refuses to leave the country without his family, Alfred confronts Patrick, finding out when Thomas bursts in that Virginia is his CIA handler, a rogue agent wanting to develop the mind control drugs further. She pulls a gun on them and Patrick reveals that Virginia sent agents to kill Martha, but then the police burst in to arrest everyone, as Alfred called them in advance. The CIA agents find Aziz and the police waiting for them at the hospital, where Martha has pulled through the operation. Alfred is released and goes to his office, finding Sandra there, and they end up having sex. Meanwhile, a tied up Glubb meets his mysterious ally, a man wearing a Guy Fawkes mask. The episode title refers to the thoroughbred racehorse Silver Birch.
25	5	"Rhyme 'n' Reason"	Jill Robertson	Robert Hull	October 20, 2022
Thomas' and Martha's relationship is strained due to the mind control assassination attempt, and they sleep in separate rooms. Patricia, Thomas' sister, arrives unexpectedly, lodging up with the Waynes. Thomas mentions how he feels about Patrick's behavior, and this gives him the impetus to leave for Gotham to confront him, taking his gun. Prime Minister Aziz hires Alfred to act as security for Zahra Khin, the rebel leader of the former British colony Kalpoor. Khin is in London for the summit but is not backed officially by the British government. After thwarting an assassination attempt on her life, Alfred takes her to his bar, where they unveil that her head of security was a traitor and deliver him bound and gagged to the Kalpoor president. Bet Sykes tracks down Mrs. Gaunt, now working as a doctor. Gaunt tries to dissuade Bet from revenge, and offers to take the baby from her, but Bet refuses. Mrs. Gaunt reveals where she can find John Salt, but asks her to minimize the bloodshed. Daveboy attends an art exhibition event at Sally's request, organized by Francis, where paint is poured on empty canvases and the guests. Sally convinces Daveboy to take a drug with her that she says will "link their dreams". It is revealed that Glubb works for Foulkes, the man in the V mask, and gave out the Lullaby State drug to select guests at the party. Without giving the subjects concrete instructions, it is not known how the drug will take effect, which is something that Foulkes wants. Alfred accompanies Zahra to her hotel room, and they have sex. Zahra is in London because she received information that her father who was supposedly assassinated ten years before is still alive. At the pub, Alfred tells a still hallucinating Daveboy that it was them who kidnapped Zahra's father. Meanwhile, Bet Sykes tracks down and repeatedly shoots an unfazed Salt, who rises back again, revealing that he is now a cyborg. Bet is taken captive. The episode title refers to the thoroughbred racehorse Rhyme 'n' Reason.
26	6	"Hedgehunter"	Jill Robertson	John Stephens	October 27, 2022
Ten years before, Zahra's father was kidnapped, with a close friend of his betraying him to Alfred. In the present, Alfred and Zahra prepare to meet with the man who offers information about her father's whereabouts. Alfred confronts Aziz, aware that ten years before they kidnapped Zahra's father for MI6, and thus British intelligence would have him today, but Aziz denies knowing about any plot. Alfred threatens to break ties with him after this last job. Meanwhile, Bet is interrogated by Salt, who developed a supersoldier like Captain Blighty. After threatening the baby, he learns that Francis Gaunt betrayed him, and orders Bet executed, but she escapes. Daveboy, still hallucinating, eats a letter Sandra gave him to deliver to Alfred. Alfred goes home for his spare gun. After finding a room full of babies all belonging to Salt, Bet finds her baby, but is stabbed in the back by Salt. She triggers his extending spike implant through his heart, seemingly killing him. Alfred and Zahra meet with the contact, who says that her father is on a secret island prison at the Hebrides. If she gives the name of all her major supporters to the Kalpoor president, the British government would release him. The contact also and tells Zahra how it was Alfred who kidnapped her father, something Alfred admits. Zahra shoots the contact and then breaks up with Alfred. A dying Bet leaves the baby on a bus to be sent to her sister Peggy. As the drug wears off, Daveboy realizes that he cannot remember the last two days' events, as Alfred says that they will go to the Hebrides to perform a prison break. In Gotham, Patrick leaves a bar, and a masked figure shoots him dead in an alley. The figure is Thomas. The episode title refers to the thoroughbred racehorse Hedgehunter.
27	7	"Don't Push It"	Danny Cannon	John Stephens	November 3, 2022
The episode title refers to the thoroughbred racehorse Don't Push It.
28	8	"Red Marauder"	Sheree Folkson	Hannah Boschi	November 10, 2022
The episode title refers to the thoroughbred racehorse Red Marauder.
29	9	"Rag Trade"	Rob Bailey	Robert Hull	November 17, 2022
The episode title refers to the thoroughbred racehorse Rag Trade.
30	10	"Highland Wedding"	Rob Bailey	Bruno Heller	November 24, 2022
The episode title refers to the thoroughbred racehorse Highland Wedding.

== Production ==
Jack Bannon as a young Alfred Pennyworth

=== Development ===
Epix gave the production a series order for the first season consisting of ten episodes in May 2018, a prequel to the Fox series Gotham. The pilot episode was written by Bruno Heller and directed by Danny Cannon, both of whom are also showrunners and executive producers. Production companies involved with the series include Warner Horizon Television. At the 2019 Television Critics Association's annual winter press tour held in February, the series was confirmed to premiere in June 2019. The premiere date was revised to July 28, 2019, on Epix. The day following the series premiere, on July 29, 2019, Cannon confirmed that Pennyworth would serve as a loose prequel to V for Vendetta as well as a direct prequel to Gotham, with the British Civil War depicted in the series' first season eventually leading to the formation of the Norsefire government of V for Vendetta. Characters wearing V's Guy Fawkes mask were later introduced in the series' third season, set five years after the first two seasons, with Heller confirming a direct crossover would take place in October 2022.

Season two began filming in January 2020; it premiered December 13, 2020. On February 1, 2023, HBO Max canceled the series after three seasons.

=== Casting ===
Jack Bannon, Ben Aldridge, Ryan Fletcher, Hainsley Lloyd Bennett, Paloma Faith, and Jason Flemyng had been cast in series regular roles in October 2018, with Bannon starring as the lead title character. Polly Walker had joined the cast in a recurring capacity in December.

Emma Paetz and Jessica Ellerby were cast in the series as Martha Kane and The Queen, respectively in March 2019. James Purefoy, who was previously cast (and replaced) as V in V for Vendetta (2005), was later cast in the second and third seasons of the series as Captain Gulliver "Gully" Troy / Captain Blighty.

=== Filming ===
Principal photography for the series commenced on October 22, 2018, at Warner Bros. Studios, Leavesden in Leavesden, Hertfordshire, England. Additionally, a number of shots were taken in London, including selecting the landmark building Florin Court as the home and neighbourhood of one of the series lead characters. Various scenes were filmed at Chatham Dockyard in Kent, where the streets stood in for East London in the 1960s. Principal photography for the series wrapped on May 24, 2019.

== Reception ==
On Rotten Tomatoes, the first season has an approval rating of 73% based on 30 reviews, with an average rating of 7.30/10. The website's critical consensus reads: "While intriguing characters and impressive set-pieces make for an engaging spy-thriller, Pennyworth doesn't add much to the greater Batman mythos." On Metacritic the series has a weighted average score of 60 out of 100 based on reviews from nine critics, indicating "mixed or average reviews".

Writing for The A.V. Club, Sam Barsanti gives the program a C, noting: "[Pennyworth] would almost be more entertaining if you changed some of the names and jettisoned the comic book connection entirely—at least then there'd be no distracting questions about why Thomas Wayne has a sister and why he's secretly working for the government instead of becoming a rich doctor back home. As it stands, though, the show is as entertaining as it is frustrating, feeling sort of like an adaptation of a comic based on Guy Ritchie's Sherlock Holmes movies (with all of the Britishness that implies)."

On Rotten Tomatoes, the second season has an approval rating of 60% based on 5 reviews.

== Broadcast ==
In the United States, the series premiered on July 28, 2019, on Epix. In Canada, the series premiered on Showcase on September 4, six weeks behind the Epix schedule. Pennyworth season one received its UK premiere on StarzPlay on Friday, October 25. Starting with its third season, the series would move to HBO Max with Epix receiving a second-run window. The third season, subtitled The Origin of Batman's Butler, and loosely adapting V for Vendetta, premiered on October 6, 2022, on HBO Max.

== Tie-in comic ==
A tie-in comic of the titular character, set after the events of the third season during the Cold War, was released in August 2021. The story is written by Scott Bryan Wilson with interior art duties handled by Juan Gedeon.
