= The Exorcism of Molly Hartley =

- DVD cover
- Directed by: Steven R. Monroe
- Written by: Matt Venne
- Produced by: Mike Elliot; Justin Bursch; Greg Holstein
- Starring: Sarah Lind; Devon Sawa; Gina Holden; Peter MacNeill
- Cinematography: Jonathan Cliff
- Edited by: Kristina Hamilton-Grobler
- Music by: Corey Allen Jackson
- Production company: Capital Arts Entertainment
- Distributed by: 20th Century Fox Home Entertainment
- Release date: October 9, 2015
- Running time: 96 minutes
- Country: United States
- Language: English

The Exorcism of Molly Hartley is a 2015 American supernatural horror film written by Matt Venne and directed by Steven R. Monroe. The film is a sequel to the 2008 film The Haunting of Molly Hartley. It was released on Digital HD on October 9, 2015, and on Blu-ray on October 20, 2015.

== Plot ==
After causing a botched exorcism that resulted in the death of a fellow priest, Father James (Tom McLaren) and a pregnant woman, Father John Barrow (Devon Sawa) is committed to a Catholic mental asylum. Chaplain Henry Davies (Peter MacNeill) informs him that the Vatican has revoked his status as a priest. Meanwhile, Molly Hartley (Sarah Lind) is arrested after police find the corpses of the two friends she engaged in a threesome with the night before. While interrogating Molly, she hears strange noises before she begins to have a deeper voice and refers to herself as "we". She is sent to the same mental asylum for psychiatric evaluation under Dr. Laurie Hawthorn (Gina Holden), but her condition worsens after an insect-like creature enters her body.

Hawthorn looks through Molly's past records and diagnoses Molly's symptoms as her subconscious fulfilling a claim she told her high school guidance counselor, Dr. Emerson, that she was claimed by the devil on her eighteenth birthday and describes it as an incubation or pregnancy for six years, six months, and six days, involving that Dr. Emerson and Molly’s ex-boyfriend Joseph Young were both killed in a double suicide, after Molly went off to Michigan. However, after supernatural occurrences happen around Molly, Dr. Hawthorn begins to believe in demonic possession. With limited options, she asks Barrow to perform the exorcism in exchange for signing his release forms. Though he initially refuses, after the suicide of an asylum employee, supernatural occurrences, and seeing Molly for himself, he visits Davies, who encourages him to help Molly, handing him his clerical attire and the items he needs to perform the exorcism. Barrow manages to perform the exorcism, trapping several insects that come out of Molly's mouth in a special box, which he keeps in a container filled with holy water.

Barrow returns the container to Davies, who places it in his basement for safekeeping. Barrow notices Davies' book on Satanism and how the letters on the cover match the letters on Molly's forehead during the exorcism. Davies explains this is "Leviathan", the fourth book of the Satanic Bible that explains the Antichrist will be born after the worst sin committed, Matricide, is committed on the "mother of the devil" or the person whose body was used to incubate the devil. Barrow demands to see the box, but upon opening the container, he finds that the box has been replaced with a large stone. Davies hits Barrow, knocking him out.

Barrow wakes up in a locked room in the asylum where he witnesses a patient commit suicide in the room next to him filled with other dead patients. An orderly comes brandishing a gun and orders him to come with him. Barrow and the orderly arrive at the underground room, where Davies takes part in a ritual to sacrifice Molly to bring forth the Antichrist and Barrow, the father of the devil since he was the one who extracted the devil through an unholy ritual. Before he can kill Molly, Dr. Hawthorn stabs Davies through the abdomen, dropping the box and releasing the insects, providing a distraction as Molly stabs Davies. Barrow, Dr. Hawthorn, and Molly escape while several of the participants are killed by the insects. Barrow assures Molly she is safe as she is driven away in an ambulance. Meanwhile, one of the insects flies into a moving school bus, where it approaches an outcast girl at the back of the bus. It inches toward her ear as the screen goes black.

== Cast ==
- Sarah Lind as Molly Hartley
- Devon Sawa as Father John Barrow
- Gina Holden as Dr. Laurie Hawthorn
- Peter MacNeill as Chaplain Henry Davies
- Daina Leitold as Janet Jones
- Julia Arkos as Beatrice White
- Tom McLaren as Father James
- Bradley Sawatzky as Orderly #1
- Steve Weller as Orderly #2
- John Cor as Daryl

== Reception ==
Trace Thurman of Bloody Disgusting gave the film a negative review, noting that "No one (and we mean no one) was asking for a sequel to the 2008 PG-13 horror film The Haunting of Molly Hartley." Adam Lee Price of Fangoria was more mixed in his review, stating that "the film did have its moments" while remarking that it was "an in-title-only sequel" to The Haunting of Molly Hartley.
