= Victoria October =

Fictional character in the Batman universe

Dr. Victoria October
- Dr. Victoria October makes her first appearance in Detective Comics #948

Publication information
- Publisher: DC Comics
- First appearance: Detective Comics #948 (March 2017)
- Created by: James Tynion IV (writer); Marguerite Bennett (writer); Ben Oliver (penciller and inker)

In-story information
- Species: Human
- Team affiliations: A.R.G.U.S.
- Abilities: World's foremost expert on human bioweaponry

Doctor October (Victoria October) is a fictional character in the Batman comic books, created by writers James Tynion IV and Marguerite Bennett and by penciller and inker Ben Oliver. A transgender bioweapons expert and physician, she first appeared as an ally to Batman in March 2017 in Detective Comics, published by DC Comics. The character has generated positive critical commentary and academic interest.

== Publication history ==
Victoria October / Doctor October first appeared in Detective Comics #948, cover dated March 2017.

== Fictional character biography ==
Victoria October is a trans woman. By her own assessment, she is the planet's foremost expert in "post-human bioweaponry", and has performed surgery on several bioengineered beings throughout her career. She and Batman knew each other for many years, even before October transitioned from male to female. Before transitioning, she suffered from severe depression and crippling self-doubt and had a "prickly" personality. She believed transitioning would solve her problems. (Note: Batman sent her a card congratulating her on her transition.) Although her new gender did not solve these issues, October gained emotional and moral strength from the knowledge that she finally knew who she was as a person and could no longer blame her gender misalignment on them. Shortly after its completion, Batman provides her with access to the Belfry, his high-technology headquarters atop Old Wayne Tower in downtown Gotham City. (Note: The Belfry was named and designed by Tim Drake (the hero Red Robin), who had an unlimited budget provided by Bruce Wayne's vast fortune. It occupies the top of Old Wayne Tower in downtown Gotham in a former headquarters of the Court of Owls. It is linked to the Batcave and most of Gotham City by sewers, the abandoned original Gotham Subway, and new tunnels dug by tunneling machines. Drake builds a high-speed "bullet" rail system in the subway and other tunnels to provide rapid access to points in the city.) (Note: Dr. October gives no indication that her visit to the Belfry in Detective Comics #959 is her first, which implies she has been there before.)

=== A.R.G.U.S. and Monstertown ===
In the 2016 Batman story arc "Night of the Monster Men", Hugo Strange uses a serum to transform living and dead human beings into horrific monsters. Four of the monsters merge into a composite monster, which is defeated by Batman, Nightwing, Batwoman, Orphan, Spoiler, and Clayface (Basil Karlo). The government agency A.R.G.U.S. creates a quarantine zone encompassing the neighborhood where the creature died, nicknaming it "Monstertown".

As a consultant for A.R.G.U.S., October is in charge of Monstertown, ensuring that no one harvests the bodies to obtain the serum and that animals (such as rats or seagulls) which eat the bodies and become monstrous are contained.

=== Curing Clayface ===
October makes her second appearance in Detective Comics #959 during the "Gotham Knights/Batman Eternal" story arc. At the Belfry, she performs surgery on the bioengineered "dwarfling" Nomoz after he is injured battling the villain Ascalon. At that time, she offers to work on a means of returning Clayface to human form permanently. Batman has Clayface wear a wristband that enables him to regain human form without using his powers—reducing the psychotic effect being Clayface has on Karlo. (Note: Batman asked Basil Karlo/Clayface to join his Gotham Knights group in an attempt to redeem the criminal.) (Note: Dr. October calls the Clayface persona a "fear response" that occurs when Karlo's mind abandons empathy and embraces anger.) The device is not a cure, as the Clayface DNA consumes Karlo's human DNA whenever he is locked into human form. October gives Karlo a "placebo" bracelet with messages from his friend Cassandra Cain (Orphan), which helps him focus on retaining his sanity. After pushing past the twelve-hour mark, Karlo loses his sanity and attacks October. Orphan intervenes, saving her life by putting the real bracelet back on.

October expresses a desire to test her cure serum on a less serious case, and Karlo told her of Glory Griffin (the villain Mudface), who was doused in the same chemicals that made Clayface what he is. (Note: As revealed in Detective Comics Annual 2018, Karlo was a movie star who was horrifically maimed in an automobile accident. Daggett Industries made a solvent which, when mixed with modelling clay, could mold a human face into any shape for a few hours. Banned for 20 years due to its toxic properties, Karlo sought out the last remaining supplies of Renu. He was doused with a large amount of the chemical when Gotham Police fired wildly at him as he tried to raid a Daggett Industries warehouse—turning him into the violent, psychotic Clayface. Karlo then attacked Griffin, the woman who ended their romantic relationship after his car crash. Griffin became deformed and although her body and skin were pliable like Karlo's, she lacked control over this power. Karlo repeatedly breaks into Arkham Asylum to talk to Glory and express his remorse for what he did.) Karlo also tells Glory about the potential cure, although she refuses to forgive him for what he did to her. Later, with the cure close to being finished, Clayface is captured by Glory when the villain First Victim takes over Arkham Asylum and releases her. Glory removes Clayface's wrist controller, and he goes insane. (Note: Clayface himself destroys the device later in the same issue.)

As Clayface races to confront Batman at the Belfry, Jacob Kane (Note: He is Batwoman's father. He is a former United States Army officer who now works for The Colony, a high-tech anti-terrorism unit funded by the U.S. government.) gives Batwoman a weapon whose ammunition will destabilize Clayface's molecular structure and kill him. Clayface arrives at Old Wayne Tower, doing significant damage to it. When confronted by Cassandra Cain, Clayface shows empathy and momentarily returns to human form. The Belfry's mudroom collapses, however, dousing him with psychoactive mud and driving him insane once more. (Note: Readers learn from a flashback featuring Tim Drake that Wayne Chemicals had collected hundreds of gallons of material from Clayface over the years. Drake placed this "mud" into a "mudroom", where the Batcomputer could cause it to take any form. The "mudroom" was used for battle training by Batman and his associates.) Batman sends Red Robin and Orphan to Monstertown to alert October to get Karlo's cure ready. She warns the heroes that although the cure will shock Clayface's system and turn him back into Basil Karlo, the effect will only be temporarily due to the massive amounts of psychoactive mud in his system.

Orphan manages to inject the cure into Clayface. Her love for him helps Karlo maintain his human form only momentarily. As he assumes his Clayface form, Batwoman shoots him in the head. October rushes to the site of Karlo's death, and confirms that the psychoactive clay is now inactive and Karlo is dead. Three days later, October cures Glory Griffin. She accuses Glory of "taking a repentant man on the brink of salvation and throwing him back into hell", and says she gave Glory the cure for Karlo's sake.

It is later revealed that Karlo survived and retains his Clayface powers to some degree. For reasons unstated, October conspired with him to fake his death. Karlo watches as Cassandra Cain takes up residence at a health clinic run by Leslie Thompkins. He leaves a message for her, and then October drives him out of Gotham City. (Note: Ian Cardona, writing for the web site CBR, argues that Dr. October either found a way to resurrect Karlo, or lied about his death so that Karlo could avoid being returned to Arkham Asylum and find his way in the world without the Clayface baggage following him.)

== Other versions ==
An alternate universe variant of Victoria October named Viktoria October appears in DC Comics Bombshells. (Note: Each issue of DC Comics Bombshells and, later, Bombshells United, was released in one or more parts digitally, and then in collected print format several months later. This article uses the digital (rather than print) release date and numbering in citations.) This version is a Russian scientist who worked with Ipati Dugan on a secret cosmonaut program funded by Lex Luthor in the years following the Russian Revolution. October and Dugan successfully send Lena Luthor into space, but Lena is lost in time and Lex demands that the Soviet authorities arrest October and Dugan. Dugan is seized and sent into exile, but October escapes. She continues to work as an agent of the Soviet government and becomes a pioneer in biomechanics and bioweaponry.

== Cultural importance ==
Some readers, Screengeek.net said, felt October's transgender status should have been more prominently mentioned and Batman's acceptance made more vocal. But Kelsey Loiselle, reviewing October's early appearances in Detective Comics, argued that writers James Tynion IV and Marguerite Bennett worked hard to ensure that October's appearances did not "us[e] transgender conversation to bolster...sales" but rather used them to discuss the meaning of identity and what it means for superheroes and readers.

Reviewer Andrew Dyce called October's introduction one of "beauty, elegance, and dignity", rather than a "reveal" meant to grab headlines and get attention. He praised October's first two appearances, arguing "it isn't Detective Comics' goal to simply acknowledge transgender individuals' existence. It's to help every reader understand what gender identity can mean to those outside of the crowd—and just as importantly, what it might not". He was particularly impressed with the "power of pronouns" dialogue in Detective Comics #959, when. October asks the bioengineered being Nomoz for preferred name, pronoun, and species identification. Dyce also pointed to October's conversation with Basil Karlo about whether a cure will get rid of his violence, lack of control, and guilt. The discussion reflects October's own gender transition, yet shows that this has meaning for non-transgender individuals (and the reader).

Reporter Marissa Higgins, writing for web site The Daily Dot, noted "how important it is for people to have representation that feels real". Dialogue in Detective Comics makes October a "real" transgender person by addressing issues fundamental to transgender people: choosing a new name, deadnaming, and revealing that one is transgender. Higgins applauded how the comic provided these details as character history and avoided making transgender identity "the all-consuming present and future" of October.

The manner in which Batman affirms his respect for October and her gender transition has also drawn positive attention. Andrew Dyce observed that Batman sends October a card after her gender reassignment—as Batman, not as Bruce Wayne. This puts the imprimatur of the widely loved superhero on gender reassignment. As the "model of ideal masculinity", author Jeffrey A. Brown writes, Batman's action enables readers (especially men) to see gender transition as appropriate behavior and transgender individuals as "perfectly normal" and worthy of respect.
