= Fetching Cody =

- Directed by: David Ray
- Written by: David Ray
- Produced by: Carolyn Allain; Christina Bulbrook
- Starring: Jay Baruchel; Sarah Lind
- Cinematography: Paul Mitchnick
- Edited by: Karen Porter
- Music by: Phillip Western
- Production companies: Cheap and Dirty Productions
- Distributed by: Panorama Entertainment
- Release date: 2005
- Running time: 87 minutes (Toronto International Film Festival)
- Country: Canada
- Language: English

Fetching Cody is a 2005 Canadian drama/science-fiction film, written and directed by David Ray. The film is set in Vancouver's Downtown Eastside and features local drag queen Robert Kaiser in a supporting role.

== Plot ==
The film follows the story of Art Frankel (played by Jay Baruchel), as he desperately tries to save his girlfriend Cody Wesson (Sarah Lind), who is in the hospital after an overdose on drugs.

Art discovers a time machine, and decides to use it to save Cody, by attempting to rewrite her past.

== Cast ==
- Jay Baruchel as Art
- Sarah Lind as Cody
- Jim Byrnes as Harvey
- Lucas Blaney as Holden Wesson
- Neil Denis as Sudden
- Liam McGuigan as David "Helmut" Yar
- Chilton Crane as Mrs. Wesson
- Nicole Muñoz as Young Cody
- Robert Kaiser as Sabrina
- Barclay Hope as Mr. Wesson
- Angela Moore as Sam
- Jessica McLeod as Rose
- Kyla Wise as Chara (credited as Kyla Anderson)
- Peter Hanlon as School Principal
- Dog Messer as Himself

== Reception ==
The movie received negative reviews.

- On review aggregator Rotten Tomatoes, the film holds a 0% rating score on five critical reviews.
- Joe Leydon of Variety described it as an "Ungainly mix of gritty street-life drama, perky teen romance, and seriocomic sci-fi time-tripping never jells."
