= Gina Holden =

Canadian actress (born 1975)

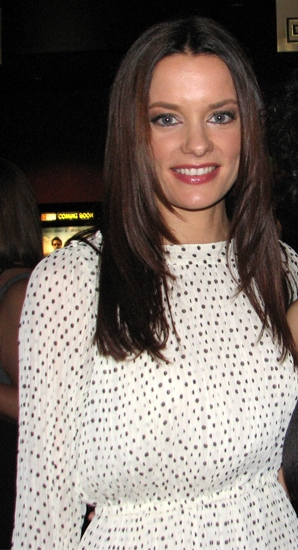
- Holden in October 2010.
- Born: March 17, 1975 (age 51); Smithers, British Columbia, Canada
- Occupation: Actress
- Years active: 2001–present
- Children: 1

Gina Holden (born March 17, 1975) is a Canadian actress. She is known for her roles as Coreen Fennel in Blood Ties, Dale Arden in Flash Gordon, Monica Eaton in Suits and Shea Allen in Harper's Island.

== Early life ==
Gina Holden was born on March 17, 1975, in Smithers, British Columbia, Canada. She has done modeling and lived in Japan.

== Career ==
Holden starred as Dale Arden in the Flash Gordon series, as Coreen Fennel in Blood Ties, and as Shea Allen in the CBS thriller series Harper's Island. She has also guest starred in shows including The CW series Life Unexpected and “Smallville”. Aside from appearing in Final Destination 3 and Aliens vs. Predator: Requiem, Holden portrayed Joyce Dagen in 2010's Saw 3D and appeared on Legend of the Seeker as Lucinda Amnell.

== Personal life ==
Holden has a son, born in 2017.

== Filmography ==
=== Film ===
List of films and roles
Year	Title	Role	Notes
2001	Rat Race	Cocktail Waitress	Uncredited
2002	Cover Story	Receptionist	Uncredited
2005	Fantastic Four	LV Receptionist	
2005	LTD.	Sam	
2006	Final Destination 3	Carrie Dreyer	
2006	Man About Town	Pretty Young Assistant	
2006	The Butterfly Effect 2	Amanda	
2007	Code Name: The Cleaner	Young Assistant	
2007	Battle in Seattle	Protester #4	
2007	Aliens vs. Predator: Requiem	Carrie Adams	
2008	Christmas Cottage	Hope Eastbrook	
2009	Screamers: The Hunting	Lieutenant Victoria Bronte	
2009	The Listener	Bridget	
2010	Saw 3D	Joyce Dagen	
2010	Messages Deleted	Millie Councel	
2011	Sand Sharks	Amanda Gore	Also co-producer
2012	Mysterious Island	Julia Fogg	
2013	Sink Hole	Joan Conroy	
2013	Dracano	Diana Fankhauser	Also co-producer
2015	L.A. Apocalypse	Ashley Wilkins	
2015	The Exorcism of Molly Hartley	Dr. Laurie Hawthorne	
2015	Dead Lines	Laura Cartwright	Short film
2016	Password Deals	Showtime Anytime Girl	Short film
2017	Taken Heart	Kate Johnson	
2017	Cop and a Half: New Recruit	Sarah Foley	
2021	Assault on VA-33	Jennifer Hill	

=== Television ===
List of television appearances and roles
Year	Title	Role	Notes
2002	Roughing It	Louise	Television film
2004	Perfect Romance	Nervous Student	Television film
2004–2005	The L Word	New Girl At 'Milk' / Twink	2 episodes
2005	The Dead Zone	Aubrey Henderson / Chrystal	Episode: "The Last Goodbye"
2005	Supernatural	Haley Collins	Episode: "Wendigo"
2005	Killer Instinct	Angela Wilkins	Episode: "Die Like an Egyptian"
2005	Reunion	Rachel Scofield	5 episodes
2005–2006	Da Vinci's City Hall	Claire	12 episodes
2006	Psych	Bethany Cadman	Episode: "Speak Now or Forever Hold Your Piece"
2006	Murder on Spec	Diana Coles	Television film; also known as Trophy Wife
2007	Blood Ties	Coreen Fennel	Main role (21 episodes)
2007–2008	Flash Gordon	Dale Arden	Main role (21 episodes)
2008	Smallville	Patricia Swann	2 episodes
2009	Harper's Island	Shea Allen	Main role (13 episodes)
2009	Flashpoint	Rachel Simpson	Episode: "The Farm"
2010	Legend of the Seeker	Lucinda Amnell	Episode: "Resurrection"
2010	A Family Thanksgiving	Jen	Television film
2010–2011	Life Unexpected	Trina Campbell	3 episodes
2011	Dear Santa	Jillian	Television film
2011	Christmas Comes Home to Canaan	Briony Adair	Television film
2011–2012	The Haunting Hour: The Series	Anna Coleman / Gresilda	2 episodes
2012	Fringe	Kate Hicks	Episode: "Nothing as It Seems"
2012	How to Fall in Love	Julie Owens	Television film
2012	The Philadelphia Experiment	Kathryn Moore	Television film
2012–2013	Suits	Monica Eton	2 episodes
2013	The Listener	Bridget Connoly	Episode: "The Long Con"
2014	Avalanche Sharks	Nurse	Television film; uncredited
2014	Teen Wolf	Claudia Stilinski	Episode: "Echo House"; scenes deleted
2014	CSI: Crime Scene Investigation	Karen Bishop	Episode: "Dead in His Tracks"
2015	Days of Our Lives	Paloma	2 episodes
2016	Cradle of Lies	Heather Ward	Television film; also known as Where's My Baby?
2016	Murder Unresolved	Carmen Campbell	Television film; also known as I Didn't Kill My Sister
2016	Secrets in the Attic	Rachel Davis	Television film; also known as Boy in the Attic
2017	Bad Date Chronicles	Allison Richards	Television film
2018	A Woman's Nightmare	Stephanie Peterson	Television film; also known as The Wrong Affair, One Nightmare Stand
2018	Christmas on Holly Lane	Cat	Television film
2019	Stressed to Death	Maggie Hart	Television film
2019	Sleeping with My Student	Kathy Sullivan	Television film; also known as Deadly Vengeance
2019	His Deadly Affair	Victoria Hart	Television film; also known as Swipe Right, Run Left
2020	Kidnapped to the Island	Michelle	Television film; also known as Fame at a Deadly Cost, No Good Deed Goes Unpunished
2023	Catfish Murder	Helen Parker	Television film
