= Emma Paetz =

Canadian actress

- Born: Emma May Ruth Paetz; Edmonton, Alberta, Canada
- Education: Guildhall School of Music and Drama
- Years active: 2005; 2015–present

Emma May Ruth Paetz is a Canadian actress. She is best known for her role as Martha Kane in the DC Universe series Pennyworth (2019–2022).

== Early life and education ==
Paetz was born in Edmonton, Alberta. She moved to Vancouver as an adult and worked as an au pair in Paris. She studied at the Guildhall School of Music and Drama in London, graduating in 2016.

== Career ==
Paetz began her career as a child actress when she appeared in the 2005 CTV Network television film Selling Innocence as Stephanie Walker. A decade later, she made her feature film debut as Jennifer in the 2015 action horror film Final Girl.

After graduating from drama school, Paetz made her professional London stage debut in 2017 when she starred in You're Human Like the Rest of Them at the Finborough Theatre and opposite Ruth Gemmell in No Place for a Woman at Theatre 503. She returned to television in 2018 with guest appearances in the Hulu and BBC One series The Looming Tower and Press respectively, and voiced Grace in the film Juliet, Naked.

In 2019, Paetz had a recurring role as Catherine Rawson in the first series of the BBC One historical drama Gentleman Jack and began starring as Martha Kane (later Wayne), Batman's mother, in the DC Universe series Pennyworth on Epix. She would reprise her role as Martha in the second and third seasons, the latter of which was released in 2022 on HBO Max. In the meantime, Paetz appeared in 8 Hotel with Ben Cura and the Minerva Theatre as well as the 2020 Irish vampire comedy film Boys from County Hell.

== Filmography ==
=== Film ===
Year	Title	Role	Notes
2015	Final Girl	Jennifer	
2018	Juliet, Naked	Grace	Voice role
2020	Boys from County Hell	Michelle	
TBA	Worry Time	Annette	

=== Television ===
Year	Title	Role	Notes
2005	Selling Innocence	Stephanie Walker	Television film
2018	The Looming Tower	Mother	Episode: "A Very Special Relationship"
2018	Press	Rachel Gilmour	Episode: "Don't Take My Heart, Don't Break My Heart"
2019	Gentleman Jack	Catherine Rawson	3 episodes
2019–2022	Pennyworth	Martha Kane	Main role
2024	The Famous Five	Dr Graves	1 episode

== Stage ==
Year	Title	Role	Notes
2017	You're Human Like the Rest of Them	Rosa / Miss Hammond	Finborough Theatre, London
2017	No Place for a Woman	Isabella	Theatre503, London
2019	8 Hotels	Uta Hagen	Minerva Theatre, Chichester
