= Craigslist =

Classified advertisements website

Craigslist Inc.
- Logo used since 1995

- Screenshot of the main page on January 26, 2008
- Company type: Private
- Website type: Classifieds, forums
- Available in: English, French, German, Dutch, Spanish, Italian, Portuguese
- Founded: March 1, 1995; 31 years ago (incorporated 1999)
- Headquarters: San Francisco, California, U.S.
- Area served: 570 cities in 70 countries
- Founder: Craig Newmark
- Key people: Jim Buckmaster (CEO)
- Services: Web communications
- Revenue: US$660M
- Employees: 50 (2017)
- Website: www.craigslist.org
- Advertising: None
- Registration: Optional
- Launched: 1995; 31 years ago
- Current status: Active
- Written in: Perl

Craigslist (stylized as craigslist) is a classified advertisements website owned by a privately held American company of the same name. The website has sections devoted to jobs, housing, for sale, items wanted, services, community service, gigs, résumés, and discussion forums.

Craig Newmark began the service in 1995 as an email distribution list to friends, featuring local events in the San Francisco Bay Area. It became a web-based service in 1996 and expanded into other classified categories. It started expanding to other U.S. and Canadian cities in 2000. In 2023, Craigslist listed seven hundred cities in 70 countries on its website and generated 560 million visits per month. Around 90% of the website's visitors are from the United States. According to Alexa, Craigslist was the 19th most visited website in the United States in 2022 and 16th worldwide in 2023.

== History ==
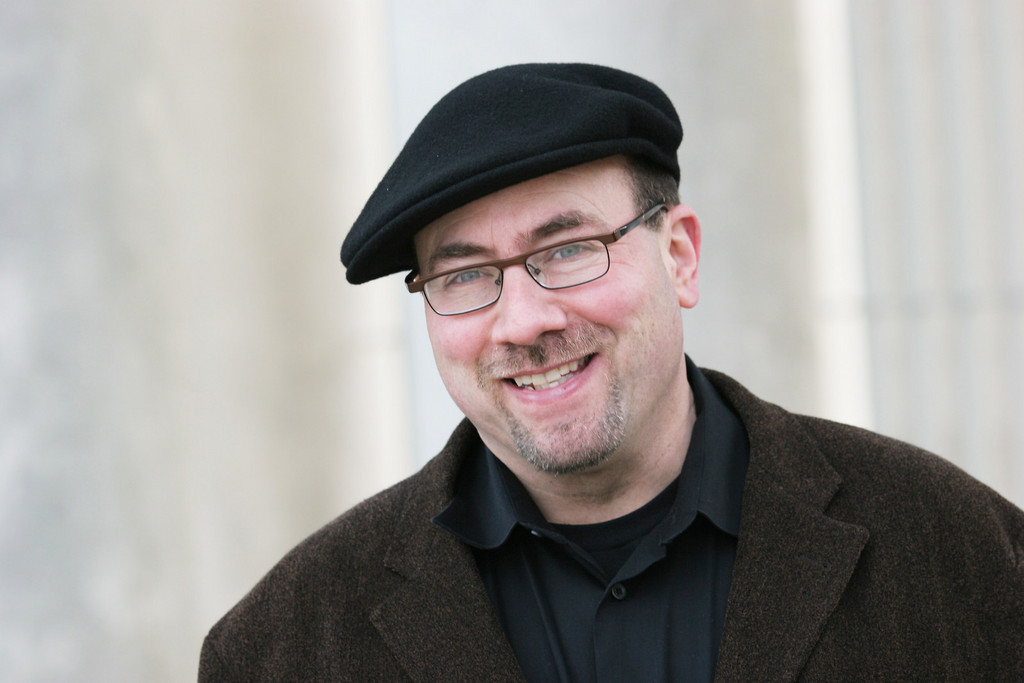
Craig Newmark, the founder of Craigslist, in 2006

According to founder Craig Newmark, he was influenced by the community-oriented interactions he had observed on early Internet services such as the WELL, MindVox and Usenet, and, as a relative newcomer to San Francisco, decided to create a similar service for local events. In early 1995, he began an email distribution list to friends. Most of the early postings were submitted by Newmark and were notices of social events of interest to software and Internet developers living and working in the San Francisco Bay Area.

The number of subscribers and postings grew rapidly via manual advertising. There was no moderation and Newmark was surprised when people started using the mailing list for non-event postings. People trying to get technical positions filled found that the list was a way to reach people with the skills they were looking for. This led to the addition of a jobs category. User demand for more categories caused the list of categories to grow. The initial technology encountered some limits, so by June 1995 Majordomo had been installed, and the mailing list "Craigslist" resumed operations. Community members started asking for a web interface. Newmark registered "craigslist.org", and the website went live in 1996.

In the fall of 1998, the name "List Foundation" was introduced, and Craigslist started transitioning to the use of this name. In April 1999, when Newmark learned of other organizations called "List Foundation", the use of this name was dropped. Craigslist was incorporated as a private for-profit company in 1999. Around this time, Newmark quit his job to work on Craigslist full-time. By April 2000, nine employees were working out of Newmark's San Francisco apartment.

In January 2000, current CEO Jim Buckmaster joined the company as lead programmer and CTO. Buckmaster worked on the site's multi-city architecture, search engine, discussion forums, flagging system, self-posting process, homepage design, personals categories, and best-of-Craigslist feature. He was promoted to CEO in November 2000.

The website expanded into nine more U.S. cities in 2000, four in 2001 and 2002, and 14 in 2003. On August 1, 2004, Craigslist began charging $25 to post job openings on the New York and Los Angeles pages. On the same day, a new section called "Gigs" was added, where low-cost and unpaid jobs can be posted for free.

In March 2008, Spanish, French, Italian, German, and Portuguese became the first non-English languages Craigslist supported. As of August 9, 2012, over 700 cities and areas in 70 countries had Craigslist sites. Some Craigslist sites cover large regions instead of individual metropolitan areas—for example, the U.S. states of Delaware and Wyoming, the Colorado Western Slope, the California Gold Country, and the Upper Peninsula of Michigan. Craigslist sites for some large cities, such as Los Angeles, also include the ability for the user to focus on a specific area of a city (such as central Los Angeles).

== Operations ==
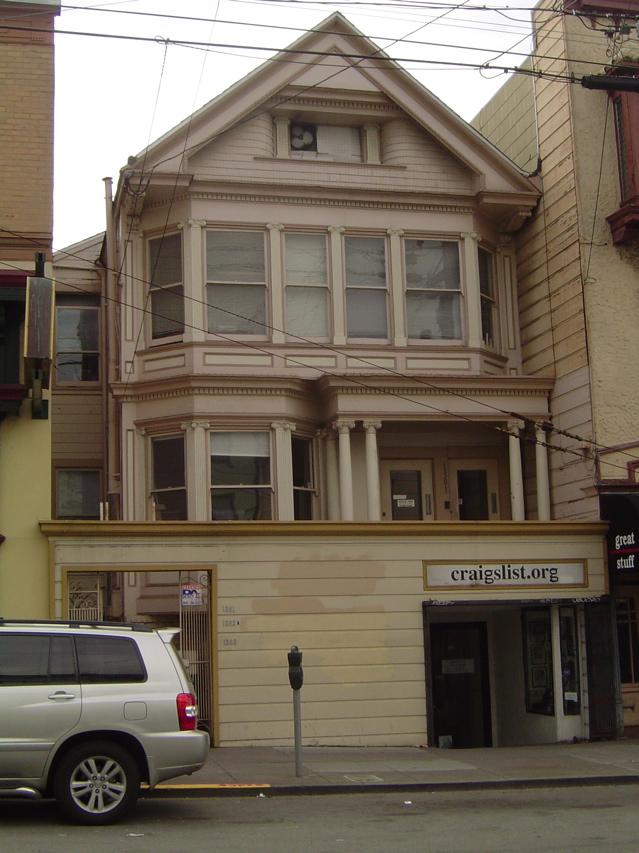
Craigslist headquarters in the Inner Sunset District of San Francisco prior to 2010

As of 2025, the site receives 142.7 million global monthly visitors and 339,000 global monthly app downloads. In terms of global rank for internet traffic, Craigslist ranks 106th. The majority of users are from the United States. When users were grouped into age ranges, the 45-54 age group was most likely to visit the website.

In 2009, the site received more than 2 million new job listings each month. The 23 largest U.S. cities listed on the Craigslist home page collectively received about 300,000 postings per day in the "for sale" and "housing" sections as of October 2011. The classified advertisements range from traditional buy/sell ads and community announcements to personal ads.

In 2009, Craigslist operated with a staff of 28 people. By 2019 this number grew to 50 people. In that year the company was estimated to have made around $1 billion in revenue.

Since around 2018, Craigslist has experienced a steady decline in traffic and revenue, with a reported revenue of $302 million in 2025, down from $1.04 billion in 2018. Some analysts have attributed this decline to increased competition from similar services such as Facebook Marketplace, OfferUp, and Mercari.

=== Financials and ownership ===
In December 2006, at the UBS Global Media Conference in New York, Craigslist CEO Jim Buckmaster claimed that Craigslist had little interest in maximizing profit, and instead preferred to help users find cars, apartments, jobs, and dates. In 2019, Craigslist generated about $1 billion in revenue, while employing only 50 people.

Craigslist's main source of revenue is paid job ads in select American cities. The company does not formally disclose financial or ownership information. Analysts and commentators have reported varying figures for its annual revenue, ranging from $10 million in 2004, $20 million in 2005, and $25 million in 2006 to possibly $150 million in 2007.

On August 13, 2004, Newmark announced on his blog that auction giant eBay had purchased a 25% stake in the company from a former employee.

The company was believed to be owned principally by Newmark, Buckmaster, and eBay (the three board members). eBay owned approximately 25%, and Newmark is believed to own the largest stake.

In April 2008, eBay announced it was suing Craigslist to "safeguard its four-year financial investment". eBay claimed that in January 2008, Craigslist executives took actions that "unfairly diluted eBay's economic interest by more than 10%". Craigslist filed a counter-suit in May 2008 to "remedy the substantial and ongoing harm to fair competition" that Craigslist claimed was constituted by eBay's actions as Craigslist shareholders; the company claimed that eBay had used its minority stake to gain access to confidential information, which it then used as part of its competing service Kijiji.

On June 19, 2015, eBay Inc. announced that it would divest its stake back to Craigslist for an undisclosed amount, and settle its litigation with the company. The move came shortly before eBay's planned spin-off of PayPal, and an effort to divest other units to focus on its core business.

In 2012, Craigslist sued the Swedish luxury marketplace website Jameslist.com, filing suit on July 11, 2012, seeking unspecified damages and a complete shutdown of Jameslist.com. As a result of the litigation, the company renamed itself JamesEdition.

=== Content policies ===
As of 2012, mashup sites such as padmapper.com and housingmaps.com were overlaying Craigslist data with Google Maps and adding their own search filters. In June 2012, Craigslist changed its terms of service to disallow the practice. In July 2012, Craigslist filed a lawsuit against padmapper.com. The lawsuit drew criticism from some commentators, including law professor Eric Goldman, who characterized it as anti-consumer and argued it threatened established Internet law.

=== App ===
In December 2019, Craigslist introduced a platform for iOS and a beta version on Android.

== Site characteristics ==
Craigslist is famous for its repeated refusal to update its website appearance. In 2026 it still features a 1995 "barebones" design, which became its most recognizable feature.

=== Personals ===
Over the years Craigslist had become a very popular online destination for arranging for dates and sex. The personals section allows for postings that are for "strictly platonic", "dating/romance", and "casual encounters".

The site was considered particularly useful by lesbians and gay men seeking to make connections, because of the service's free and open nature and because of the difficulty of otherwise finding each other in more conservative areas.

In 2005, San Francisco Craigslist's men seeking men section was attributed to facilitating sexual encounters and was the second most common correlation to syphilis infections. The company has been pressured by San Francisco Department of Public Health officials, prompting Jim Buckmaster to state that the site has a very small staff and that the public "must police themselves". The site has, however, added links to San Francisco City Clinic and STD forums.

On March 22, 2018, Craigslist discontinued its "Personals" section in the United States in response to the passing of the Stop Enabling Sex Traffickers Act (SESTA), which removes Section 230 safe harbours for interactive services knowingly involved in illegal sex trafficking. The service stated that

US Congress just passed HR 1865, 'FOSTA', seeking to subject websites to criminal and civil liability when third parties (users) misuse online personals unlawfully. Any tool or service can be misused. We can't take such risk without jeopardizing all our other services, so we are regretfully taking craigslist personals offline. To the millions of spouses, partners, and couples who met through craigslist, we wish you every happiness!

=== Adult services controversy ===
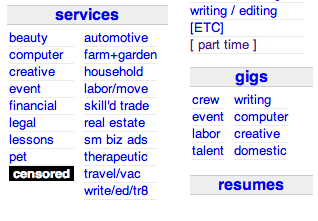
Craigslist website as it appeared on September 4, 2010, with black censored box in place of Adult Services

Advertisements for "adult" (previously "erotic") services were initially given special treatment, then closed entirely on September 4, 2010, following a controversy over claims by state attorneys general that the advertisements promoted prostitution.

In 2002, a disclaimer was put on the "men seeking men", "casual encounters", "erotic services", and "rants and raves" boards to ensure that those who clicked on these sections were over the age of 18, but no disclaimer was put on the "men seeking women", "women seeking men" or "women seeking women" boards. As a response to charges of sex discrimination and negative stereotyping, Buckmaster explained that the company's policy is a response to user feedback requesting the warning on the more sexually explicit sections, including "men seeking men".

On May 13, 2009, Craigslist announced that it would close the erotic services section, replacing it with an adult services section to be reviewed by Craigslist employees. This decision came after allegations by several U.S. states that the erotic services ads were being used for prostitution.

On September 4, 2010, Craigslist closed the adult services section of its website in the United States. The site initially replaced the adult services page link with the word "censored" in white-on-black text. The site received criticism and complaints from attorneys general that the section's ads were facilitating prostitution and child sex trafficking.

The adult services section link was still active in countries outside of the U.S. Matt Zimmerman, senior staff attorney for the Electronic Frontier Foundation, said, "Craigslist isn't legally culpable for these posts, but the public pressure has increased and Craigslist is a small company." Brian Carver, attorney and assistant professor at UC Berkeley, said that legal threats could have a chilling effect on online expression. "If you impose liability on Craigslist, YouTube and Facebook for anything their users do, then they're not going to take chances. It would likely result in the takedown of what might otherwise be perfectly legitimate free expression."

On September 8, 2010, the "censored" label and its dead link to adult services were completely removed.

Craigslist announced on September 15, 2010, that it had closed its adult services in the United States; however, it defended its right to carry such ads. Free speech and some sex crime victim advocates criticized the removal of the section, saying that it threatened free speech and that it diminished law enforcement's ability to track criminals. However, the removal was applauded by many state attorneys general and some other groups fighting sex crimes. Craigslist said that there is some indication that those who posted ads in the adult services section are posting elsewhere. Sex ads had cost $10 initially and it was estimated they would have brought in $44 million in 2010 had they continued. In the four months following the closure, monthly revenue from sex ads on six other sites (primarily Backpage) increased from $2.1 to $3.1 million, partly due to price increases.

The company has tried to fight prostitution and sex trafficking, and in 2015, Craig Newmark received an award from the FBI for cooperation with law enforcement to fight human trafficking.

On December 19, 2010, after pressure from Ottawa and several provinces, Craigslist closed 'Erotic Services' and 'Adult Gigs' from its Canadian website, even though prostitution was not itself illegal in Canada at the time.

When the Fight Online Sex Trafficking Act was signed into law on April 11, 2018, Craigslist chose to close its "Personals" section within all US domains to avoid civil lawsuits. About their decision, Craigslist stated "Any tool or service can be misused. We can't take such risk without jeopardizing all our other services."

=== Flagging ===
Craigslist has a user flagging system to report illegal and inappropriate postings.

Flagging does not require account login or registration, and can be done anonymously by anyone. Postings are subject to automated removal when a certain number of users flag them. The number of flags required for a posting's removal is dynamically variable and remains unknown to all but Craigslist staff. Some users allege that flagging may also occur as acts of vandalism by groups of individuals at different ISPs, but no evidence of this has ever been shown. Flagging can also alert Craigslist staff to blocks of ads requiring manual oversight or removal.

Flagging is also done by Craigslist itself (Craigslist's automated systems) and the posts will never appear on the search results.

=== Bartering ===
Craigslist includes a barter option in its "for sale" section. This growing trade economy has been documented on the television program Barter Kings and the blog one red paperclip.

== Criticism ==
From its earliest days, Craigslist faced criticism for allowing illegal or unethical activities and for poor protection of buyers and sellers. Some well-recognized types of illegal activities comprise: counterfeit goods, advanced fee fraud and buyer-seller collusion. In the "counterfeit goods" scam, the seller uses a marketplace to sell illegal or counterfeit products, while misrepresenting them as legitimate goods. In "advanced fee fraud," the seller tricks the buyer into making an unsecured (i.e. not via a credit card or another legitimate escrow service) payment before receiving the product/service. In "buyer-seller collusion," a fraudulent buyer uses the victim's payment information (such as a credit card number) to buy fake goods from a colluding fake seller, thus getting the money from the victim and evading the traditional credit card safeguard practices.

In its defense, Craigslist successfully used Section 230 of the US Communications Decency Act (CDA), which states that websites cannot be held liable for the actions of their users. Craigslist also successfully challenged a 2017 FOSTA amendment to the CDA, which created an exception allowing legal actions against a platform, if its users violate federal sex-trafficking laws (see Dart v. Craigslist, Inc.).

In July 2005, the San Francisco Chronicle criticized Craigslist for allowing ads from dog breeders, stating that this could encourage the over-breeding and irresponsible selling of pit bulls in the Bay Area. According to Craigslist's terms of service, the sale of pets is prohibited, though re-homing with small adoption fees is acceptable.

In addition to allowing illegal activities and to poor customer protection, Craigslist has been accused of unfair competition numerous times. For example, in January 2006, the San Francisco Bay Guardian published an editorial claiming that Craigslist could threaten the business of local alternative newspapers.

L. Gordon Crovitz, writing for The Wall Street Journal, criticized the company for using lawsuits "to prevent anyone from doing to it what it did to newspapers," contrary to the spirit of the website, which describes itself as a "noncommercial nature, public service mission, and noncorporate culture". This article was a reaction to lawsuits from Craigslist, which Crovitz says were intended to prevent competition. Craigslist filed a trademark lawsuit against the Swedish luxury marketplace website, Jameslist.com, on July 11, 2012, forcing the company to rename it JamesEdition.

In 2012, Craigslist sued PadMapper, a site that hoped to improve the user interface for browsing housing ads, and 3Taps, a company that helped PadMapper obtain data from Craigslist, in Craigslist v. 3Taps. This led users to criticize Craigslist for trying to shut down a service that was useful to them.

== Nonprofit foundation ==
In 2001, the company started the Craigslist Foundation, a § 501(c)(3) nonprofit organization that offered free and low-cost events and online resources to promote community building at all levels. It accepted charitable donations, and rather than directly funding organizations, it produced "face-to-face events and offers online resources to help grassroots organizations get off the ground and contribute real value to the community".

In 2012, the Craigslist Foundation closed, with charity work moving to support other charitable funds.

== In popular culture ==
=== Films ===
- 24 Hours on Craigslist (2005), an American feature-length documentary that captures the people and stories behind a single day's posts on Craigslist
- Due Date shows one of the lead characters, Ethan (Zach Galifianakis), buying marijuana from a dealer through the site.
- The Craigslist Killer (January 3, 2011), a Lifetime made-for-TV movie featuring the story of Philip Markoff, who was accused of robbing and/or murdering several prostitutes he met through Craigslist's adult services section.
- Craigslist Joe (August 2012), a documentary featuring a 29-year-old man living for 31 days solely from donations of food, shelter, and transportation throughout the U.S., found via Craigslist
- Mike and Dave Need Wedding Dates (2016), a comedy based on a real Craigslist ad placed by two brothers who wanted dates for their cousin's wedding that went viral in February 2013, which they then turned into a book, Mike and Dave Need Wedding Dates: And a Thousand Cocktails.
- Creep (2014) and its sequels Creep 2 (2017) and The Creep Tapes (2024-present) were inspired by Mark Duplass' experiences with strange ads on the site.

=== Television ===
- The American comedy series Bored to Death revolves around a fictional Jonathan Ames (played by Jason Schwartzman) who posts an ad on Craigslist advertising himself as an unlicensed private detective.
- The premise of the sitcom New Girl centers around a girl (Zooey Deschanel) who looks on Craigslist to find new roommates. She misunderstands one of the listings and ends up moving in with three men when she had intended to find female roommates.
- The American television mockumentary comedy sitcom Modern Family in the 10th episode of the third season "Express Christmas" mentions Craigslist when Phil Dunphy played by Ty Burrell buys a signed Joe Dimaggio card for his father-in-law Jay played by Ed ONeill.

=== Theatre ===
- In November 2007, Ryan J. Davis directed Jeffery Self's solo show My Life on the Craigslist at off-Broadway's New World Stages. The show focuses on a young man's sexual experiences on Craigslist and was so successful that it returned to New York by popular demand in February 2008.

=== Songs ===
- In June 2009, "Weird Al" Yankovic released a song entitled "Craigslist", which parodied the types of ads one might see on the site. The song was a style parody of The Doors and featured Doors member Ray Manzarek on the keyboards.
- In 2006, composer Gabriel Kahane released an album of his satirical art songs for voice and piano, entitled Craigslistlieder, using excerpts from real Craigslist ads as text.

=== Media ===
- Craigslist received attention in the media in 2011 and 2014 when it was reported that convicted murderers had used the platform to lure their victims.
- The site has been described by Martin Sorrell as "socialistic anarchist".

== See also ==
- List of online marketplaces
