= 24 Hours on Craigslist =

2004 American documentary film

- Cover
- Directed by: Michael Ferris Gibson
- Produced by: Michael Ferris Gibson
- Edited by: Jennifer Leo Russ
- Release date: March 2004 (SXSW)
- Running time: 82 minutes
- Country: United States
- Language: English

24 Hours on Craigslist is a 2004 American documentary film that captures the people and stories behind a single day's posts on the classified ad website Craigslist. The film, made with the approval of Craigslist's founder Craig Newmark, is woven from interviews with the site's users, all of whom opted in to be contacted by the production when they submitted their posts on August 4, 2003. The documentary screened in nine film festivals during 2004 and 2005, winning a 'best feature documentary', and played in a limited, self-distributed, theatrical release in 2005 and 2006. The film was released on DVD on April 25, 2006.

== Synopsis ==
24 Hours on Craigslist tells the story of 121 people who used Craigslist on August 4, 2003.

== Production ==
Michael Ferris Gibson, an independent filmmaker, was inspired one night in early 2003 to surf every category of Craigslist's San Francisco. Three hours later he had the inspiration for 24 Hours on Craigslist. After spending five more hours drafting a treatment, he contacted Craig Newmark about the idea. Two days later Michael met with Jim Buckmaster, Craigslist's CEO, and Craig Newmark to discuss the film concept: creating a documentary entirely 'from' Craigslist; crew, cast, and music would all be sourced from the site.

Newmark picked the chosen day out of a hat from which to generate the user posts that were used in the film. The production filmed the individuals and followed their stories and interactions with other users over the next three months.

== Film festivals ==
Several different versions of 24 Hours on Craigslist screened in nine different film festivals around the world. In addition, the film was selected to screen in Toronto, Ontario, Canada, in April 2005 by HotDocs for its monthly screening series Doc Soup.

2004

- South by Southwest
- International Documentary Film Festival – Amsterdam

2005

- San Francisco Independent Film Festival
- Against Gravity Film Festival (Poland)
- Newport Beach Film Festival
- Idaho Film Festival
- Vail Film Festival
- DeadCENTER Film Festival
- Toofy Film Festival (Winner Best Feature Documentary)

== Awards ==
- Best Documentary Feature - Toofy Film Fest 2005
- Best Local Film - East Bay Express Readers' Choice Awards 2006

== Commercial distribution ==
The director and producer of the film distributed 24 Hours on Craigslist theatrically in the United States and Canada under the distribution label of Zealot Pictures. Heretic Films released the film on DVD on April 25, 2006.
