= Craigslist Joe =

- Directed by: Joseph Garner
- Produced by: Eve Marson Singbiel, Joseph Garner, Angelique Sheppard
- Starring: Joseph Garner
- Cinematography: Kevin Flint
- Edited by: Drew Kilcoin
- Music by: David G. Garner
- Release date: August 3, 2012
- Running time: 90 min.
- Country: United States
- Language: English

Craigslist Joe is a 2012 documentary film that follows Joseph Garner for a month of travel across the United States, solely supporting himself by contacting people on the website Craigslist. He spent the month without using any form of currency and without contacting people he already knew, relying on Craigslist users' "kindness and generosity".

== History ==
Garner came up with the concept for the documentary during the Great Recession in 2008, while working as the assistant director for The Hangover:

The country was falling apart around me, people losing their homes, people just out on their own. So I got to thinking: If I lost everything, what would happen? I'd probably be OK, because I have great friends and family. But what if I didn't?

Another theme Garner hoped to explore in the film was the effect of social media and other technology on social interactions.

He hired a cameraman, Kevin Flint, via Craigslist a week before beginning his travels in Los Angeles. Flint received a food stipend, so was not completely dependent on Craigslist users. Garner's only possessions during the 31-day experiment were "a laptop, a new cell phone with a new number he hadn't shared with anyone, a new email address, a passport, toothbrush and the clothes on his back". All meals, shelter, and transportation would be acquired solely from connections he made on Craigslist.

Garner and Flint journeyed across America, visiting many major cities, including New York, Chicago, Tallahassee, New Orleans, Portland, and San Francisco (where he met Craigslist's founder, Craig Newmark). Garner also visited Mexico with one of the connections he made.

Flint recorded 80 hours of footage in their 31 days of travels. The original rough cut of the documentary was 12 hours long, according to Garner.

Upon returning home, Garner was greeted by his parents and closest friends. When asked by his mother how to describe the experience, he can only come up with the word "inspiring". "The generosity, and the stories that they share, and the connections that I've made in one month is so deep."

== Reception ==
Craigslist Joe elicited mixed reactions. Drew Prindle, for Digital Trends, wrote, "The doc definitely has a few flaws, but they are mostly overshadowed by its numerous strengths." Variety's Dennis Harvey opined that the movie was shallow and bland.

Several critics, including The Hollywood Reporter's John DeFore, Slant Magazine's Diego Costa, and Village Voice's Ernest Hardy, have pointed out that Garner's "experiment" is somewhat "limited", since Garner, "a young, middle-class white man", enjoys social privileges that many impoverished people lack.
