= JamesEdition =

Online luxury marketplace

- JamesEdition logo
- Company type: Private company
- Website type: Classifieds, luxury, media
- Available in: English
- Founded: 2008; 18 years ago (as JamesList)
- Headquarters: Amsterdam, Netherlands
- Owner: JamesEdition B.V.
- Key people: Noam Perski (CEO JamesList 2009–2011); Johan Bengtsson (CEO 2011-2016); Roman Bach (CEO 2016–2017); Eric Finnas Dahlstrom (CEO)
- Website: www.jamesedition.com
- Commercial: Yes
- Launched: 2008; 18 years ago (as JamesList)
- Current status: Active
- Written in: Ruby on Rails

JamesEdition is a global online luxury marketplace with headquarters in Amsterdam, Netherlands. The website has 15 different categories. These are: real estate, cars, jewellery, jets, helicopters, watches, yachts, extraordinaire, motorcycles, lifestyle & collectibles, residential developments, experiences, yachts and vacation rentals.

Sellers can post their offers to JamesEdition and will be published after editorial review. It is an upmarket form of a classified advertising portal. The strict curation of all listings have resulted in several media coverages. Some listings have been posted to Top Gear and The Guardian websites. It has been referred to by some as Craigslist for the rich or even "Craigslist for billionaires". The advertised goods are so rare that the website has received regular coverage by other websites, print magazines and TV stations.

== History ==
The company was founded 2008. It changed its name from JamesList to JamesEdition in February 2013, after becoming the defendant in a lawsuit by Craigslist in June 2012. In 2016 the company changed its shareholders structure, appointed a new CEO and moved the company from Sweden to the Netherlands.

In 2017, it was reported that JamesEdition would expand its business model beyond classifieds.

== Most famous items for sale ==
Although JamesEdition is famous for continuously offering a broad selection of supercars and other luxury items or estates.

- August 2017: The first ever built Ferrari Sergio to come on the market in Ensloo, Netherlands for a total amount of US$5 million.
- July 2017: the most expensive property in Baja California Norte, Mexico for US$634 million.
- June 2017: "The LAMBOAT", a Lamborghini Aventador with a matching Speedboat in Miami, US, for US$2.2 million
- Dec 2016: The only Ferrari LaFerrari Aperta available of all 200 produced for sale. Quotation from Dortmund, Germany for highest bid
- August 2016: The first GTA Spano ever to appear on the market. One of only 99 produced cars is offered in Marbella, Spain for EUR 1.5 million
- July 2016: 1966 Batmobile #5 by George Barris in Philadelphia, USA, Price not disclosed
- May 2016: Neverland Ranch from Michael Jackson Estate in California, USA, For Sale at 100 million US$
- May 2016: Thriller Villa from Michael Jackson Estate in Las Vegas, USA, For Sale at 9.5 million US$
- June 2015: The Formula 1 car Ayrton Senna drove during The Monaco Grand Prix in 1984, For Sale at £1 million.
- March 2014: The Tumbler Batmobile replica from The Dark Knight, For Sale at 1 million US$ and has attracted buyers from around the world, according to the seller.
- October 2013: Swiss bank-vault filled with coins worth 8 million Swiss Francs, located in Basel, Switzerland, For Auction
- April 2010: Ferrari 250 GT Berlinetta from Steve McQueen pre-owned by Herbert von Karajan, For Sale at 1.6 million US$
- March 2010: 1949 ZIL ZIS-110 Limousine from Joseph Stalin in Finland, Price not disclosed
- September 2009: Most expensive car ever sold in an auction: "Star of India" 1934 Rolls-Royce Phantom II convertible from collector Hans-Gunther Zach in Germany, Auctioned for US$13 million
