= Batmobile =

Fictional automobile in Batman comics

- A Batmobile from the variant cover of Detective Comics #986 (August 2018). Art by Mark Brooks.

Publication information
- Publisher: DC Comics
- First appearance: Detective Comics #27 (May 1939)
- Created by: Bill Finger

In story information
- Type: Vehicle
- Element of stories featuring: Batman

The Batmobile is the fictional automobile driven by the superhero Batman, used both to patrol Gotham City for crime and to engage in car chases or vehicular combat with the city's criminal underworld. The Batmobile is part of a suite of highly advanced equipment at Batman's disposal in the Batcave, which the vehicle accesses through a hidden entrance.

The concept of a dedicated automobile for the superhero originates in Detective Comics issue #27 (May 1939), with the name being coined in issue #48. Its appearance has varied but, since early appearances, the Batmobile has had a prominent bat motif, typically including wing-shaped tailfins. Customized in the early stages of Batman's career, each incarnation has reflected evolving car technologies. It has been portrayed as having many uses, such as vehicular pursuit, prisoner transportation, anti-tank warfare, riot control, and as a mobile crime lab. In some depictions, the Batmobile has individually articulated wheel mounts and is able to be remotely operated. It has appeared in various media outside comics including television, films, and video games, and has since become part of popular culture.

In the Batwheels animated TV series, the Batmobile is voiced by Jacob Bertrand.

== Comic book publication history ==
=== DC Universe ===
==== 20th century ====
===== Golden Age of Comic Books =====
An early Batmobile design from Batman #5 (March 1941). Art by Bob Kane and Jerry Robinson.

Batman is shown driving a red car in his debut story in Detective Comics #27. The red car was never mentioned by name as the Batmobile. Although the Batplane was introduced in Detective Comics #31, the name "Batmobile" was not applied to Batman's automobile until Detective Comics #48 (February 1941). The car's design evolved in early Batman stories. It became a "specially built high-powered auto" by Detective Comics #30. Batman #5 (March 1941) introduced a long, powerful, streamlined Batmobile with a tall scalloped fin and an intimidating bat head on the front. Three pages after its introduction, it was forced off a cliff by the Joker and crashed in the ravine below. An identical Batmobile appeared in the next story printed in the same issue. The predominant designs settled on a large, dark-colored body and bat-like accessories such as large tailfins scalloped to resemble a bat's wings.

Other bat-vehicles soon followed, including the Batcycle, Batboat, and Robin's Redbird.

===== Silver Age of Comic Books =====
The 1966–1968 television series Batman was so popular that its campy humor and its version of Batmobile were imported into Batman's comics. The iconic television Batmobile was a superficially modified concept car, the decade-old Lincoln Futura, owned by auto customizer George Barris, whose shop did the work. When the series was canceled in 1968, the comic books became darker and more serious. The comics' version of Batman abandoned that version of the Batmobile. Its replacement was a simpler model with a stylized bat's head silhouette decal on the hood being the only decoration of note. The 1960s TV style Batmobile still appears from time to time in the comic books, most recently in Detective Comics #850 and in Batman Confidential.

===== Bronze Age of Comic Books =====
In the Bronze Age of Comic Books, the source of the cars was explained in The Untold Legend of the Batman as the work of stunt driver Jack Edison. Edison had volunteered to personally construct Batmobiles for Batman after being rescued from a burning wreck.

In mid-1985, a special variation of the Super Powers toyline Batmobile appeared in both Batman and Detective Comics. This design had a full set of front and rear canopies, "Coke-bottle" sides, integrated fins, and generally rounder features, just like the toy. The only difference between this car and its toy counterpart is the nose, which was sometimes drawn as longer and more pointed.

===== Modern Age of Comic Books =====
Beginning in the 1990s, the number of comics featuring Batman mushroomed with spin-off titles, limited series, and graphic novels. At the same time, there was considerable experimentation with styles of illustration. With different illustration styles in so many different books, there was naturally a corresponding diversity of designs for the Batmobile. This has continued with designs for the Batmobile ranging from conservative and practical to highly stylized to outlandish.

During the "Cataclysm" storyline, it is revealed that Batman has hidden a number of spare vehicles across the city just in case. A Humvee serves as a primary mean of transportation to cross the earthquake-ravaged city during the Aftershock storyline, as the primary Batmobile is wrecked by the quake. These vehicles are not as sophisticated or as fast as the Batmobiles, but some of them are armed with non-lethal riot control and combat artilleries and armored to withstand ammunition mounted on military automobile prototypes.

==== 21st century ====
===== 2000s =====
In the "Batman: Hush" storyline, a double-page spread by Jim Lee shows various Batmobiles (from comics, films, and all TV series) in storage in the Batcave, reveals that Batman now has more than one of his iconic ground vehicles. In addition, some incarnations of the character, such as Batman: The Animated Series, establish that Batman has a large ground vehicle fleet of various makes and models as well as utility vehicles to use when the Batmobile would be too conspicuous. In issue 9 of the third volume of Teen Titans, Robin and his friends use a Batmobile that he shipped out to San Francisco, hiding the expense "in the Batarang budget".

The 2008 book Batmobile Owner's Manual, gives theoretical specifications of the car as if it were a real car. The book states that the Batmobile's five-cylinder engine is more powerful than turbine jet engines, and capable of achieving up to 10,000 horsepower (7,500 kW).

In the 2009 series Batman and Robin, a new Batmobile is unveiled. This model is capable of flight, although is not as maneuverable as the Batwing. It can fire 19 types of projectiles, one of which is a flame retardant non-toxic foam, and features a concussive sonic blast device. This Batmobile was designed and constructed by Bruce Wayne. However, its construction was the source of great frustration to him, as mentioned by Alfred Pennyworth, and thus not finished. In Batman and Robin #1 it is revealed that Bruce's son, Damian Wayne, solved the problem of its inability to fly and completed it.

===== 2010s =====
Batmobile in Batman Annual (vol. 3) #1 (January 2017). Art by David Finch.

The Batmobile was redesigned in 2011 when DC Comics relaunched its entire line of comic books, with the Batmobile being given new aesthetics.

In 2016, DC Comics relaunched its comic books once again in DC Rebirth and opted to rebrand the continuity to "DC Universe" in December 2017. While many different models of the Batmobile are seen within the Batcave, the model that is primarily used in DC Universe is a revised version with a more rectangular design and an armored appearance. However, this is not always the case, such as in Batman (vol. 3) #4, and #5. In the future neo-Gotham, a sleek, flying car version of the Batmobile is primarily used instead.

=== Elseworlds and Alternate Universes ===
In Batman: Holy Terror, the Batmobile is depicted on a two-page spread at the end of the story, with Bruce musing that it was provided to him by the remaining members of the underground movement against the religious dictatorship that rules the world in this timeline.

In Batman & Dracula: Red Rain, the Batmobile is presented as a basic open-topped car with a single bat-wing at its rear, similar in design to the original Batmobile in the comics. Batman was forced to abandon the Batmobile after the destruction of Wayne Manor to stop Dracula's vampire 'family' deprived him of a suitable place to keep the car, although Bruce reflects that he no longer needs the car after his transformation into a vampire grants him bat-like wings. However, it is revealed in Crimson Mist – the third novel in the trilogy – that the Batmobile survives in the remains of the Batcave, with Alfred briefly hiding behind it to escape Killer Croc during a chase through the cave.

In Batman: The Dark Knight Returns, the Batmobile has been modified into a tank-like armored riot control vehicle, complete with machine guns shooting rubber bullets, a large cannon mounted on the front, and large tank treads in place of tires. According to Batman's narration, the only thing that can penetrate its armor "isn't from this planet" with the "damnedest alloy surface". Batman also mentions that it was Dick Grayson who came up with the name. The tank-like vehicle appears to take up two lanes of traffic on a normal road, evidenced when returning from Batman's initial fight with the leader of the Mutants, and thus is too big for normal land travel around Gotham. In the scenes prior to Batman's last stand with the Joker, Batman uses a motorcycle to traverse the city, using the tank again after the attempted nuclear strike and fires in Gotham, although it is torn apart during Batman's battle with Superman. This Batmobile reappeared in All Star Batman and Robin the Boy Wonder #4, which shows its construction by robots in the Batcave.

In Frank Miller's sequel to The Dark Knight Returns, The Dark Knight Strikes Again, the batmobile is drawn with the same design and art style as Batman #5.

In Frank Miller's All Star Batman and Robin the Boy Wonder, the car can convert into a harrier jet and a submarine. Dick Grayson comments that the name Batmobile is "totally queer". However, in Batman: The Dark Knight Returns, which exists in the same continuity, Grayson was stated as the one who coined the name.

In Absolute Batman, the Batmobile is reimagined as gigantic, modified dump truck. As Bruce Wayne is a working class engineer in this universe, everything about it is homemade and built by himself. It is two stories tall, has external stairs that led to a gangway to access the cockpit from the outside, and is equipped with non-lethal turret rounds that fire tiny bat-projectiles. The vehicle is capable of collapsing its roof for better speed along with homemade jet engines and can seal off all windows and vents to function underwater. It was introduced in issue #2, where Batman uses it escape from the authorities and the Party Animals along with Alfred Pennyworth. Its origin is revealed in the Absolute Batman 2025 Annual where Batman stole the original dump truck from a construction site in Slaughter Swamp, which he used to break into the hideout of a white supremacist gang.

== Animated appearances ==
=== Television ===
The Batmobile made a brief cameo at the end of the Looney Tunes Show episode "Reunion". Bugs Bunny drove off in it after seeing the Bat-Signal because, in that show, he is secretly Batman. This Batmobile slightly resembles the Golden Age version.

==== The Batman/Superman Hour ====
According to the site BatmobileHistory.com, the Batmobile created for the 1968–1969 Filmation Associates TV series was not strongly based on its immediate predecessor (except for sharing dual rear cockpit canopies with the Barris/Futura Batmobile) or any version in DC Comics publications of the time. Furthermore, Filmation's Batmobile featured a long, black body with what is described as a "Coke bottle" profile, with a large, light blue bat emblem set across the hood, which, when a dashboard control was activated, the metal bat symbol folded its "wings" up at its center, forming a barricade/chain cutter. There were no door-mounted bat symbols.

Another departure from the Barris Batmobile was a single windshield and large, elevated bat-fins. Curiously, the car's underside was colored light blue, and it appeared to conceal the car's chassis except for a motorized panel, from which devices such as the Bat-winch would emerge. It is assumed Filmation's Batmobile used this light blue underside color to make the panel and devices easier to see. Additionally, the cockpit seating was a vibrant red, with a dashboard panel using bat accents around an inset monitor screen, among other details. Filmation's Batmobile used parachutes, inflatable pontoons, and, in case of damaged tires, vertical and rear-mounted jets to lift and propel the car—which then essentially caused it to function as a high-powered hovercraft. The Filmation Batmobile from The Batman/Superman Hour was one of the few Batmobiles not to see adaptations to any DC Comics publications or have any commercially available replicas (toys, diecast cars, plastic model kits, etc.).

==== Super Friends ====
The Batmobile was seen in the early episodes of Super Friends was based on the Lincoln Futura design in the live-action TV series starring Adam West. The main difference with the Super Friends version was that the car's lines were modified substantially for use in animation. The most obvious change was to the car's nose, where the hood received a "V" depression that echoed the lower fascia. This was also the first Batmobile (of any medium) to feature yellow bat emblems on the doors. This particular feature would be quickly adopted by the comics.

Beginning with the Challenge of the Superfriends in 1978, the Batmobile got revamped. This new version was developed to have a more aerodynamic, hard-edged style. In addition, this Batmobile was smaller than its predecessor. It had a sloped nose and flying buttress B-pillars. Features that were carried over from the original Super Friends Batmobile were the Bat-mask, low horizontal fins, twin bubble windshields, and blue coloring scheme.

In 1984, Super Friends revamped its format (first as Super Friends: The Legendary Super Powers Show and then as The Super Powers Team: Galactic Guardians) to serve as a tie-in to Kenner's Super Powers Collection.

==== DC animated universe ====
The Batmobiles throughout the DC animated universe

The Batmobile made appearances in the various series of the DC animated universe.

===== Batman: The Animated Series =====
The Batmobile in Batman: The Animated Series combined style elements from various eras to produce a long, low vehicle with square lines, long fins, and a blunt nose with a massive chrome grille that could have been from any time from the 1930s to the 1990s. This version of the Batmobile also vaguely resembled the Batmobile from the first two Tim Burton films. Despite the obvious presence of the jet exhaust, the show frequently used sound effects from a reciprocating engine for the Batmobile's driving scenes. This, plus direct views of the engine (as seen in the episode "The Mechanic"), suggests that the car used a large piston engine for primary power and an auxiliary jet or nitro engine for high-speed acceleration. It also had an armored stationary mode to prevent people from tampering with the car when it was left unattended, though this was not as overt as the "shields" used in the 1989 film Batmobile. The original Batmobile design had many design variants as well as Bruce Wayne's limousine, as seen in Batman Beyond, which the producers referred to as "an upside-down Batmobile". It also made a cameo in the episode "The Call, Part 1", of the third season of Batman Beyond.

====== Features ======
Among the features of the Batmobile were the following:

- smoke and oil dispensers
- wheel slasher hubs
- missile rack
- tear gas dispensers
- ejection seats
- titanium alloy wheels and body panels
- reversible jet exhausts
- shield platings

====== Replicas ======
Massimo Tonoi is the owner of a Batman: The Animated Series Batmobile real-life replica.

===== The New Batman Adventures =====
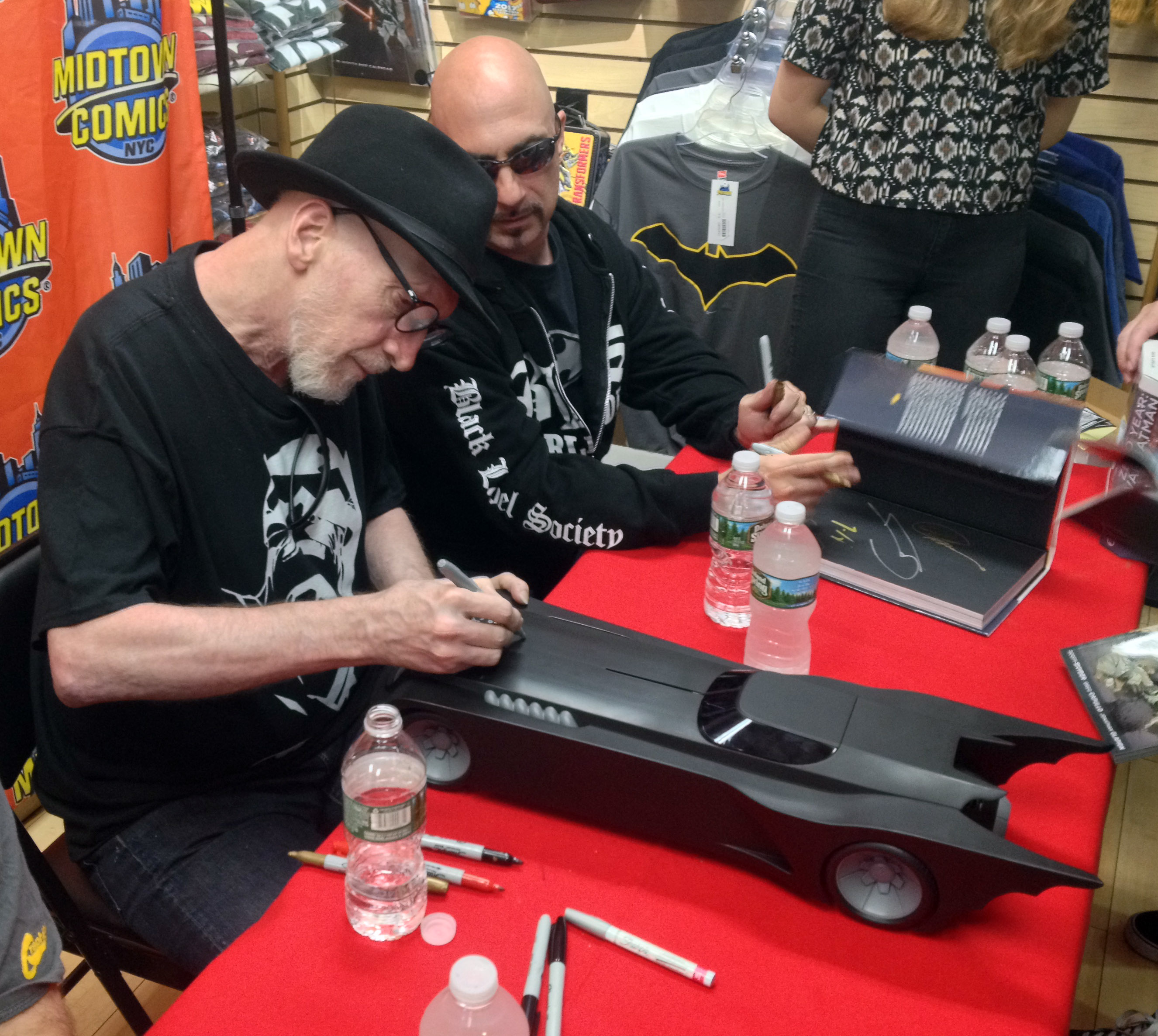
Comics creators Frank Miller and Greg Capullo sign a toy Batmobile based on the animated series during an appearance at Midtown Comics.

The Batmobile was redesigned in The New Batman Adventures with its jet engine being most notably absent. This Batmobile design is re-used in Justice League, and Justice League Unlimited, though it appears somewhat more blue than black in paint color. The vehicle possessed bullet-resistant cockpit windows. If the tire were shredded a replacement tire immediately takes over after discarding the previous.

===== Batman Beyond =====
A new flying Batmobile design appears in Batman Beyond used by the new Batman (Terry McGinnis). This version of the vehicle made multiple appearances in the future of the DC Universe as flying cars were shown as commonplace technology in this future. This design is a radical departure from the usual style of Batmobiles, as they usually have a bat motif, from a bat faceplate on the grille to tail fins resembling bat wings.

This version of the Batmobile is a simple sleek pod with sharp angles and rounded sides. Its interior is a red illuminated single-person cockpit, with computer circuitry and displays visible all around. It is armed with guided immobilizer missiles and grappling cables. Being a "single-seat" by design, it was never meant to carry two people, as shown when Terry's friend Maxine was once sitting behind the seat to great discomfort. According to Bruce, the vehicle's top speed is Mach 3; however, Terry has never piloted the vehicle at those speeds through Gotham City. It features a drop-down hatch; this allows Terry swift exit/entrance from underneath without having to park the vehicle and get out, allowing him to literally get the drop on his opponents. Like Terry's batsuit the Batmobile features a camouflage system rendering it invisible; a holographic projector can disguise it as an ordinary car to keep away prying eyes and potential vandals. The vehicle has built-in digital recorders and cameras for collecting audio and visual evidence.

==== The Batman ====
In the animated series The Batman, the Batmobile resembled a sports coupe with multiple jet exhaust slits protruding from the back bumper. In the third season episode "RPM", this Batmobile was wrecked beyond repair, and Batman completed a prototype design that included a Wayne Industries 'EXP' power generator. This Batmobile was longer and had a lower profile with only one triangular jet exhaust coming from the rear of the car resembling the one from Batman: The Animated Series. At the end of the episode, Batman remarks that due to the Batmobile EXP's success, it is a 'keeper'. In the fourth season, the episode "Artifacts" explores Gotham City in the year 2027, looking back from 3027, complete with a new tank-like Batmobile reminiscent of Frank Miller's design for the Batmobile in The Dark Knight Returns.

==== Scooby Doo and Guess Who? ====
The Batmobile appears in the episode "What a Night, for a Dark Knight!". It is based on the first live-action television series from 1966 to 1968.

==== Batman: Gotham Knight ====
In the straight-to-DVD animated shorts collection Gotham Knight, the Batmobile makes an appearance in the feature entitled "Field Test". While set in the same continuity as Christopher Nolan's films, it is based on a pastiche of the Batmobile as it has appeared in various films. Also, the Batmobile appears in the feature entitled "Working Through Pain"; wherein Alfred arrives to pick up Batman. The Batmobile appearing in this scene seems to be inspired by its appearance in the 1989 live-action film.

==== Batman: The Brave and The Bold ====
The Batmobile in Batman: The Brave and the Bold takes design elements from the Golden Age Batmobiles and the Lincoln Futura. This Batmobile has the ability to transform into other vehicles. The tie in toyline's Batmobile shares this feature, transforming from car to jet. On at least one occasion, it has converted into a mecha similar to the Bat-Bots seen in Kingdom Come. In the episode "Game Over for Owlman!", Batman uses a backup Batmobile which resembles a Studebaker.

==== Beware the Batman ====
The Batmobile in "Beware the Batman" is a low and flat F1-like car with a single seated cockpit and pointed nose. The car has horizontal fins flanking a pair of jet engines, large wheels with low-profile tires, as well as a sharply angled canopy. This version, as is common with Batmobiles, seems very durable, with low profile armoring, as throughout the show it has taken shots from rocket launchers without any noticeable damage, stood up to high powered demolition machinery without any visible markings to the point of breaking said machinery, etc. The interior features a voice command system, a video link system, and more, directly routed to the Batcomputer.

==== Titans ====
The Batmobile appears via a static visual effect in the live-action series Titans. In the episode "Jason Todd" during a flashback to Dick Grayson's time as Robin, the Batmobile is shown very briefly, parked inside the Batcave. It was realised without a physical car, but instead one of more than 30 designs provided by concept artist John Gallagher to the visual effects company Encore VFX. This Batmobile is later seen in greater detail during the season finale when the Gotham City Police Department launches an assault on the Batcave.

==== Batwheels ====
The Batmobile appears as the main protagonist in the Batwheels animated TV series, with an artificial intelligence voiced by Jacob Bertrand. The character is nicknamed "Bam" by the Batcomputer, and is the leader of a team of vehicles.

The 32nd episode of the series, titled "To the Batmobile!", features Bam's predecessor in the form of the “Awesomely Dynamic Automobile” (A.D.A.M.), based on the Batmobile from the 1966 series. A.D.A.M. is named after Adam West, with archival voice recordings of West being used for A.D.A.M.'s dialogue.

=== Film ===
==== The Lego Movie ====
In The Lego Movie a large six-wheeled version of the Batmobile (which is actually the Batwing transformed by Batman) appears equipped with sub-woofers. It is destroyed during the attack on Cloud Cuckoo Land.

==== The Lego Batman Movie ====
In The Lego Batman Movie, multiple versions of the Batmobile from different Batman adaptations appear. In the film, Batman drives the "SpeedWagon" Batmobile, which appears to take inspiration from previous Batmobiles. This Batmobile also uses "atomic batteries", a feature seen in 1960s depictions. Other Batmobiles appear briefly, including the one from the 1960s television series, Tim Burton films, Batman Forever, the Golden Age, Frank Miller's The Dark Knight Returns, The Dark Knight trilogy, and Batman: The Animated Series.

The Speedwagon was fault-driven by "Nightwing" (alter-ego of Robin when Batman is missing in the world) combined with the novice skills of Nightwing caused the speedwagon's destruction, but at the climax of the film, Batman, his Bat-family, and former Joker henchmen make a new Batmobile with four detachable vehicles (Bat-Plane for Batgirl, Bat-Assault Vehicle for Bat-Alfred, Bat-Cycle (inspired by The Dark Knight) for Robin and a proper Batmobile for Batman).

==== Ready Player One ====
The 1960s TV series Batmobile appears in the Steven Spielberg 2018 film Ready Player One, based on the novel of the same name by Ernest Cline. It was portrayed using computer-generated imagery. Appearing as part of a race alongside many famous vehicles from pop culture, the Batmobile is destroyed when it is struck by another vehicle and explodes. As it skids out, the skidding sound effect is the same cadence as the theme from the opening credits of the Batman TV series.

=== Video games ===
- In the Sega CD adaptation of Batman Returns, the Batmobile was controlled during the time bonus stages after missions were completed.
- There are two Batmobile levels in the 2005 video game adaptation of Batman Begins. Electronic Arts used the Burnout 3: Takedown engine for these levels. Batman has to ram enemy cars off the road which results in a "Takedown" while picking up Nitro boosts along the way that float on the road in holographic bubbles. Xbox World Australia called these sequences the highlight of the game. Cheatcc.com called them "by far the best Batmobile levels ever featured in a game".
- In the PlayStation game Batman: Gotham City Racer, the player gets the full independence to drive the Batmobile.
- In DC Universe Online, during the "Batcave: Inner Sanctum" alert/raid, the Batmobile is destroyed by the Armored Robotic Custodian, a sentinel robot that has been taken over by Brainiac.
- In Injustice: Gods Among Us, Batmobile appears at the end of Batman's Super Move, ramming his opponent.
  - In the mobile version, in addition to its appearance in the Super Move, the Batmobile (and the evolved form, Militarized Batmobile) can be obtained as a gear card, granting its user increased health; if equipped by a Batman character, it additionally grants his Super Move increased damage, area effect damage, and invulnerability after using it.
- The 2013 Batman arcade game is based around the Batmobile, with players controlling it in vehicular combat missions. Ten different Batmobile designs are available for play, including the designs from the 1960s television series, The Animated Series, The Brave and the Bold, Arkham Asylum, and every Batman film up to and including The Dark Knight Rises.
- On February 25, 2016, it was confirmed via Twitter that the 2015 game Rocket League would be receiving a Batmobile car pack on March 8, 2016, to coincide with the release of Batman v Superman: Dawn of Justice.

==== Batman: Arkham series ====
In Batman: Arkham Asylum, a version of the Batmobile appears with a design heavily influenced by the one used in the 1989 Batman film and Batman: The Animated Series. In the game, it is vandalized by Harley Quinn and the Blackgate Penitentiary prisoners. Batman later controls the Batmobile remotely using his utility belt to take Bane into the sea along with it. In Batman: Arkham City, the Batmobile appears in the Batcave Predator Challenge Map under re-construction following its tussle with Bane, thus explaining its absence in the rest of the game. In Batman: Arkham Origins, a prototype of the Batmobile is seen in the Batcave under construction by Batman, under the working title "Urban Assault Vehicle"; when scanned in Detective Mode its description reads: "Armored to resist direct collisions and small arms fire. Multiple LTL armaments. Shield tracking profiles reduced thermal/radar footprint. 1.200BHP. 7MPG. Status: Under Maintenance." After Bane destroyed the Batcave, the prototype fell off the ledge, destroyed, with Alfred under the rubble. The destroyed remains of that early Batmobile could still be seen on the ledge.

In Batman: Arkham Knight, a different version of the Batmobile—Urban Assault Vehicle—retains its classic shape and designs, but is heavily influenced by the ones used in The Dark Knight Trilogy. The car is an off-road vehicle, highly maneuverable, possessing numerous non-lethal deterrents, heavier than a light tank; the ability to absorb impact makes it nearly indestructible and affects anything it collides with in a similar fashion. It can be called to Batman instantly with the press of a button and can eject Batman hundreds of feet in the air to instantly begin gliding. Batman can also control the Batmobile remotely using his Batmobile Remote gadget and it can even support Batman while he is fighting free-flow combat via a Batmobile assisted Special Takedown. Like the Batsuit and gadgets, the Batmobile can be upgraded and even has its own alternate skins (such as one based on the Batmobile from the 1960s TV series). The game also features Batmobiles from other Batman media that appear as DLC and are used in the main game upon the main story's completion as well as in special Racing AR Challenges.

===== Technical specifications =====
The Arkham Knight Batmobile—Urban Assault Vehicle—has a "Reconfigurable Embedded System", featuring two modes between which it can transform: pursuit mode and battle mode.

Pursuit Mode is the default Pursuit and Capture form used for driving around the city and tackling race tracks that the Riddler has set up. It contains boost and jump mechanisms, non-lethal missiles used to immobilize getaway vehicles and an EMP taser unit to stun criminals and enemy vehicles.

Overview

- Manufacturer: Wayne Enterprises Applied Sciences Division
- Production: 2 built
- Designer: German automaker Zimmer

Body and chassis

- Class: Reconfigurable Embedded System / Urban Assault Vehicle / Multiple LTL armaments
- Body style: 1-door sliding canopy
- Layout: Mid-engine, all-wheel-drive
- Stealth: Shield tracking profiles reduced thermal/radar footprint

Powertrain

- Hybrid: Turbocharged Combustion Engine / Honeywell AGT1500C multi-fuel jet turbine
- Engine: 8.0 L (488 cu in) quad-turbocharged
- Torque: 1750 lbf.ft at 98.7% ROS
- Power output: 895 kW (1,217 PS; 1,200 hp)
- Operational range: 426 km (265 miles)–724 km (450 miles)
- Fuel efficiency: 205 mpg (energy equivalency)
- Transmission: 7-speed dual-clutch 0.4 km (0.25 mi) in 9.7 seconds @ over 300 km/h (190 mph)

Dimensions

- Wheelbase diameter: 1.40 m (55 in)
- Ground clearance: 0.43 m (17 in)
- Length: 4.62 metres (182 in)
- Width: 3.7 metres (150 in) [widened profile in combat mode]
- Height: 1.2 metres (47 in) [raised profile in combat mode]
- Curb weight: 2.5 short tons (2.3 t)

Performance

- Acceleration: 0.0 to 96.6 km/h (0.0 to 60.0 mph) in 2.7 seconds;
- Top speed: 336.5 km/h (209.1 mph) [without afterburner]
- Turn speed: 72 kilometres per hour (45 mph)
- Jump distance: 860.14 metres (2,822.0 ft)

Afterburner

- Top speed: raises maximum speed threshold(s) by 30%
- Fuel type: Nitro methane
- Temperature at vent: 1100 °C

Cockpit

- Driver: Electromagnetic ejector seat
- Batcomputer: Enhanced intelligence and reconnaissance capabilities
- Navigation: Artificial intelligence and remote guidance systems

Containment unit

- Purpose: Passenger transport
- Space: 3 seats
- Blast resistance: Resistant to kinetic forces exceeding 4,500 lb/sq in

Steering and braking system

- Air brakes: Regenerative energy mechanism
- Materials: Graphene composite
- Actuator: High speed hydraulic cylinder
- Stopping distance reduction: 78%

Battle Mode transforms the Batmobile's appearance into an off-road tank-like armored Tactical Assault form capable of raising/lowering/widening its suspension, wheelbase and axle track, depending on its combat or navigational situations. This provides a wider, more stable footprint and increased maneuverability thanks to individually articulated wheels with 360° of lateral spin. Its LED headlights alternate from blue to red. In battle mode a remote-controlled turret rises from the top of the vehicle with an array of weapons for anti-armor, anti-air and non-lethal anti-personnel.

Armor plating

- Thickness: 120mm at thickest point; Explosive reactive armor around the cockpit
- Material: Carbon nanotube aggregate
- Blast resistance: 10 tons per square inch of force
- Purpose: Resistance direct collisions and small arms fire

M61 Vulcan close-in weapon system

- Rotary cannon: six-barrel, air-cooled, electrically fired Gatling-style
- Ammunition gauge: 25mm caliber
- Fire rate: 6,000 rounds per minute
- Length: 1.8 meters
- Purpose: Anti-tank, anti-missile, and surface to air combat

60mm direct-fire cannon

- Ammunition type: 60 mm high explosive anti-tank penetrator shells
- Muzzle velocity: 1,680 meters per second
- Armor penetration: Estimated to penetrate 820 mm of steel armor at point-blank range

Riot suppressor

- Ammunition: Non-lethal slam rounds
- Slam rounds: Flexible plastic casing filled with 50 grams of rubber pellets
- Purpose: Designed to deliver minimum long-term trauma and render combatant immobile

Electroshock defense

- Voltage: 200–300 kV range
- Delivery: Front and rear conductor rods
- Purpose: Propel combatant and disabled vehicles

Gyroscopic wheels

- Suspension: Hydraulic arm-mounted wheel hub motor
- Powertrain: H-drive capable of 360 lateral spins for combat maneuvering
- Material: Advanced bullet-resistant synthetic fiber composite tweel
- Purpose: Synthetic composite all-terrain traction technology

Winch

- Purpose: Multipurpose grapple claw
- Range: 60 m
- Weight supported: 2.2 t

Immobilizer missiles

- Payload: 5gm high explosive cl-20/HMX cocrystal
- Warhead: 2.75 in (70 mm)
- Guidance: Laser/infrared homing

===== Features =====
The driver is positioned centered—faced down; this position offers greater protection to the driver during combat, while reducing any chance of injury whenever Batman uses the ejection seat. The bulletproof Batmobile can be summoned to the player's location while on foot or, if the player is airborne, sent to meet Batman as he lands. The vehicle features the ability to perform jumps, speed boosts, rotate on the spot, smash through objects like barricades and trees, and fire missiles that can immobilize enemy vehicles. Batman can eject from the Batmobile and immediately begin gliding around Gotham City.

Some enemies will run away at the sight of the vehicle, eliminating the need for Batman to fight them, and enemies attacking the car can be subdued by its automated taser defenses. Like Batman, the Batmobile can be upgraded with new abilities. The Batwing is used in conjunction with the Batmobile to deliver upgrades, while providing real-time surveillance and close air support. Riddler challenges also feature objectives requiring the Batmobile, such as timed races in tunnels beneath Gotham City, where the environmental obstacles change during each lap, and invisible question marks that must be revealed using the Batmobile's scanner.

The Batmobile has two modes, which can be switched at any time: Pursuit and Battle. Pursuit is for moving from area to area and completing specific driving challenges. In Battle mode, the Batmobile becomes more tank than car, allowing a full 360-degree range of movement, including strafing in any direction, while revealing the multiple weapon systems on board, including a Vulcan chain gun for quick damage, a 60 mm hypervelocity cannon for fire support, anti-tank guided missiles for wide-ranging damage against multiple targets, and a non-lethal riot suppressor.

Additional upgrades to the vehicle include an EMP device, which releases an electric pulse used to temporarily stun enemy drones; and the "drone virus", which allows the player to override the weapon systems of enemy vehicles and cause them to attack each other. The Batmobile can also be controlled remotely, driven in indoor locations, and used in solving the game's puzzles, such as lowering an inaccessible elevator with its attached winch.

== Live-action appearances ==
=== Batman (1943 serial) ===
In the 1943 serial film Batman, a black 1939 Cadillac Series 75 convertible was used by Bruce Wayne and Dick Grayson, as well as their secret identities Batman and Robin. (It was driven with the top down as Bruce and Dick, and with the top up when they were in disguise.) Alfred chauffeured the Dynamic Duo in both identities.

=== Batman and Robin (1949 serial) ===
In Batman and Robin, the 1949 successor to the original serial, the duo drive around in a 1949 Mercury.

=== 1963 promotional tours ===
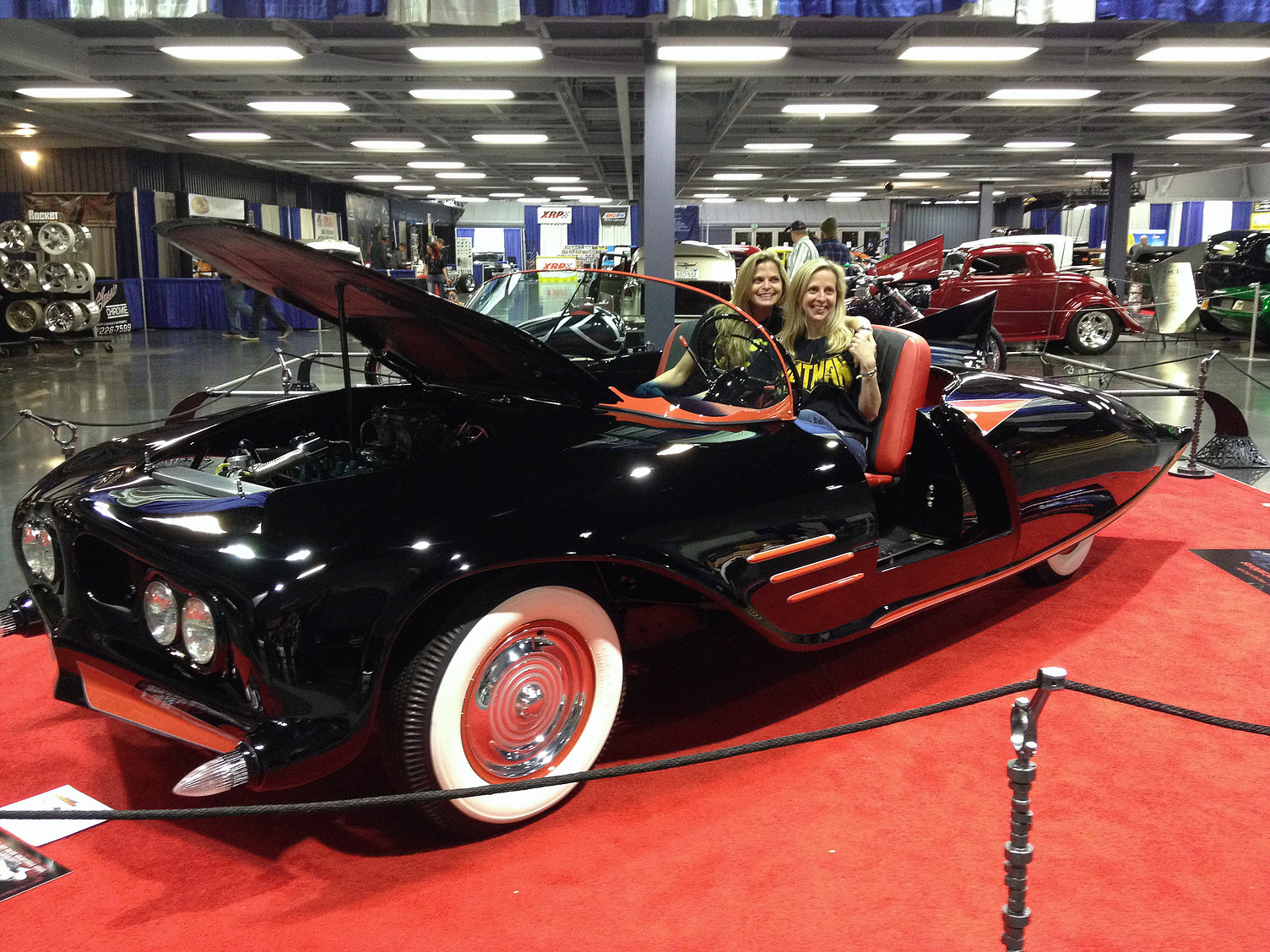
1963 Batmobile exhibited February 2014 shortly after restoration with original builder's daughters Karen and Darlene Robinson.

The first car ever publicly toured as a Batmobile was built several years before the Barris Batmobile of the TV series. It was inspired by DC Comics and was created in 1960 and finished in 1963 by Forrest Robinson of Westmoreland, New Hampshire, using a 1956 Oldsmobile Rocket 88 chassis powered by an Oldsmobile Rocket 324 cubic inch engine and building a handmade custom body.

The car was initially used unpainted for a short time as a daily driver and then later leased by a DC Comic licensee (National Periodical publications then owner of DC Comics licensed the use of Batman characters including the Batmobile to various companies), painted in Batman Colors replete with official Batman decals, and toured as "Batman's Batmobile" in several small towns on the East coast of the United States. It was used as part of an advertising program for All-Star Dairy Products which had a Batman dessert product line.

After the TV Batmobile by George Barris was created and replicas were made available for promotional events in late 1966, the first Batmobile was returned to Robinson. Robinson then removed the official Batman decals, repainted it in silver, and again used it as a daily driver for a short time and then sold it. After lying in a field in New Hampshire for almost five decades the very poorly preserved car was sold in 2008 and after going unrestored through a few owners was sold in February 2013.

After a year of work in 2013, the car was restored by expert car restorer Mario Borbon of Borbon Fabrications in Sacramento, California.

=== Batman (1960s film/television series) ===
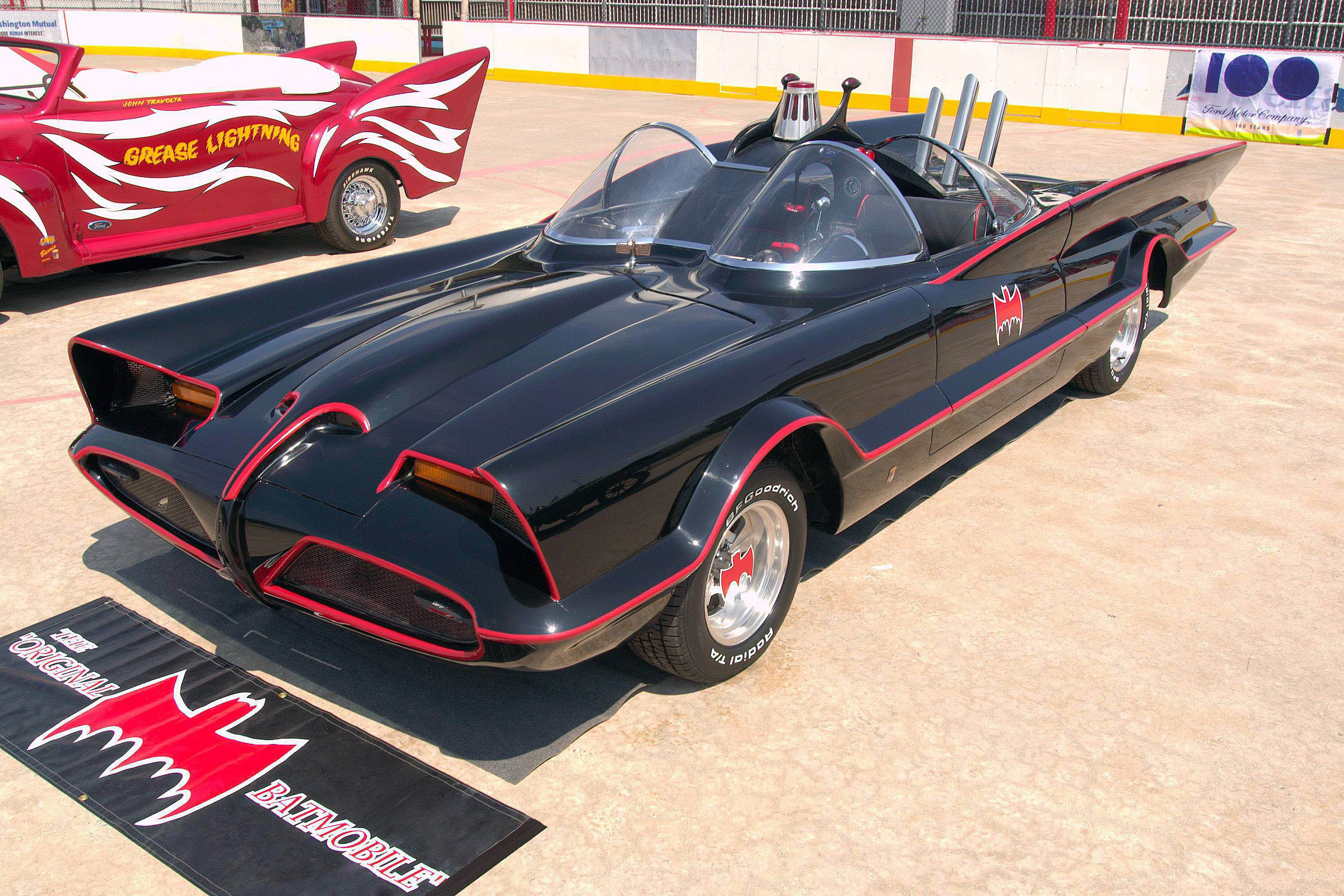
The Lincoln Futura-based Batmobile as seen in the 1960s Batman TV series

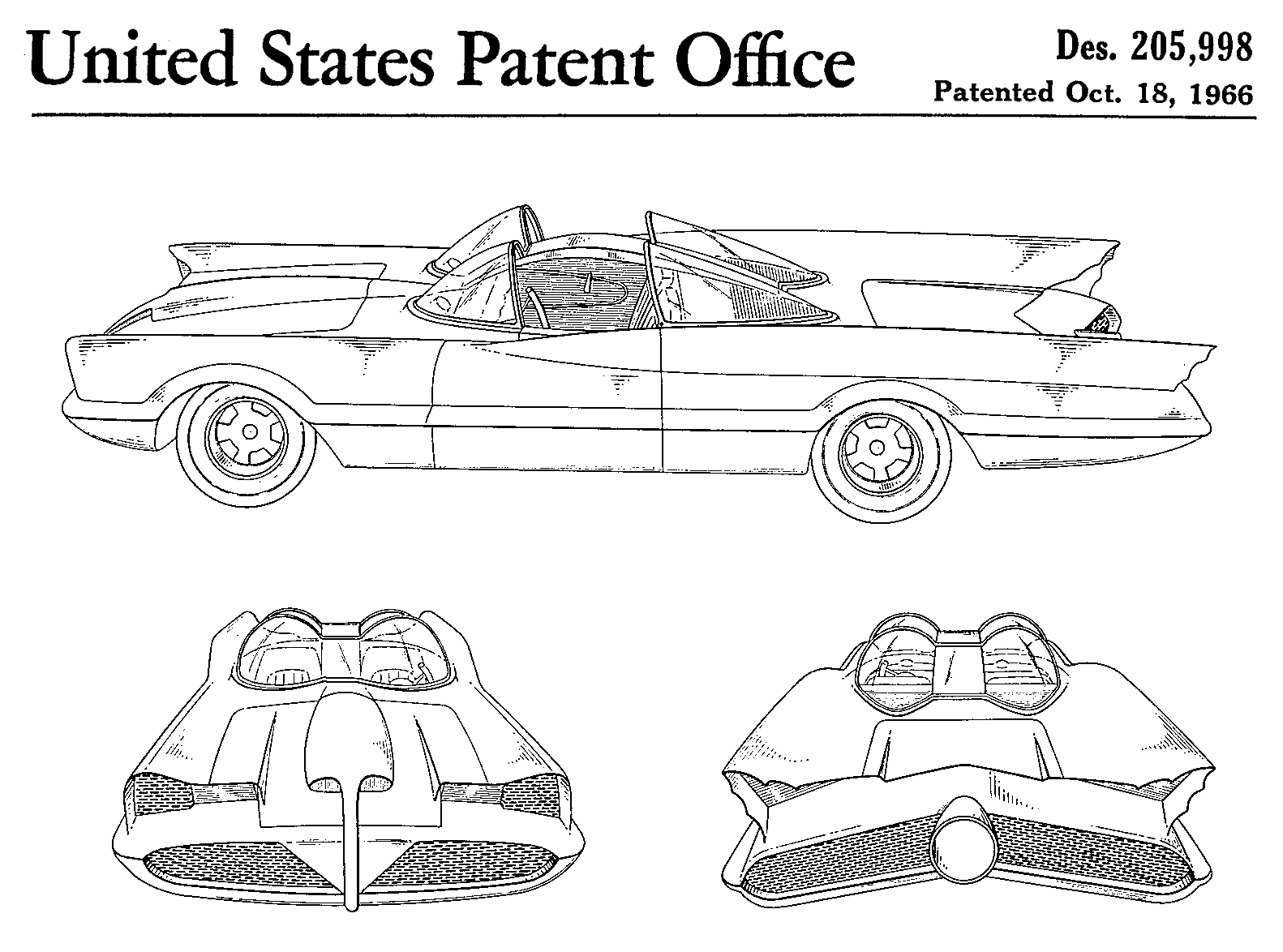
The patent for the 1966 television Batmobile, built by George Barris from a Lincoln Futura concept car

In late 1965 20th Century Fox Television and William Dozier's Greenway Productions contracted renowned Hollywood car customizer Dean Jeffries to design and build a "Batmobile" for their upcoming Batman TV series. He started customizing a 1959 Cadillac, but when the studio wanted the program on the air in January 1966, and therefore filming sooner than he could provide the car, Jeffries was paid off, and the project went to George Barris.

What became the iconic Batmobile used in the 1966–1968 live action television show and its film adaptation was a customized vehicle that originated as a one-off 1955 Lincoln Futura concept car, created by Ford Motor Company lead stylists Bill Schmidt, Doug Poole Sr., and John Najjar and their design team at the Lincoln Styling Department.

In 1954, the Futura prototype was built entirely by hand by the Ghia Body Works in Turin, Italy, at a reported cost of US$250,000—the equivalent of approximately US$2.5 million in 2021. The chassis was an early prototype Y-shaped backbone perimeter frame that would go into production on the 1956–1957 Contential Mk II. It made its debut in pearlescent Frost-Blue white paint on January 8, 1955, at the Chicago Auto Show. In 1959, sporting a fresh red paint job, the Futura was featured in the film It Started with a Kiss, starring Debbie Reynolds and Glenn Ford.

Barris was trying to get Hollywood's attention with the Futura, which he had purchased from Ford for the nominal sum of $1.00 and "other valuable consideration", but aside from its film appearance, the Futura had been languishing in his Hollywood shop for several years. With only three weeks to finish the Batmobile (although in recent years Jeffries says that his car was dropped because he was told it was needed in "a week and a half", he was quoted in 1988 as saying "three weeks" as well), Barris decided that, rather than building a car from scratch, it would be relatively easy to transform the distinctive Futura into the famous crime-fighting vehicle. Design work was conducted by Herb Grasse, working as an associate designer for Barris.

Barris hired Bill Cushenbery to do the metal modifications to the car and its conversion into the Batmobile was completed in just three weeks, at a reported cost of US$30,000. They used the primer-painted, white-striped car in October 1965, for a network presentation reel. Shortly afterward, the car was painted gloss black with "fluorescent cerise" stripes. Barris retained ownership of the car, estimated to be worth $125,000 in 1966 dollars, leasing it to 20th Century Fox and Greenway Productions for use in the series.

When filming for the series began, several problems arose due to the car's age: it overheated, the battery died, and the expensive Mickey Thompson tires repeatedly failed. By mid-season, the engine and transmission were replaced with those of a Ford Galaxie. The most frequent visual influence of this car is that later Batmobiles usually have a rear rocket thruster that fires as the car starts up.

In November 2012 Barris Kustom and George Barris announced the sale of the Batmobile at the Barrett-Jackson car show and auction held in Scottsdale, Arizona. The vehicle fetched $4.2 million on January 19, 2013.

The car was resold for an undisclosed amount and as of August 2016, Dave Anderson in Fairfax, Virginia owns the #1 made from the Futura Concept Car and he also owns the #2 car (the first replica that Barris built).

==== Technical specifications ====
- Curb weight: 5,500 pounds (2.5 t)
- Wheelbase: 126 inches (3.2 m)
- Length: 226 inches (5.7 m)
- Width: 90 inches (2.3 m)
- Height: 48 inches (1.2 m)
- Fins: 84 inches (2.1 m)
- Engine: 390 cubic inches (6.4 L) Ford FE V-8
- Transmission: B&M C-6 Automatic (2nd transmission)

==== Features ====
This Batmobile's gadgets include a nose-mounted aluminum Cable Cutter Blade, Bat Ray Projector, Anti-Theft Device, Detect-a-scope, Batscope, Bat Eye Switch, Antenna Activator, Police Band Cut-In Switch, Automatic Tire Inflation Device, Remote Batcomputer—radio linked to the main Batcomputer in the Batcave, the Batphone, Emergency Bat Turn Lever, Anti-Fire Activator, Bat Smoke, Bat Photoscope, and many other Bat gadgets. If needed, the Batmobile is capable of a quick 180° "bat-turn" thanks to two rear-mounted ten-foot Deist parachutes. To answer viewer complaints about the parachutes being jettisoned on to the street as litter after deployment, the producers included a parachute pickup crew that is on standby to recover them, completed with a van so labelled. The main license plate seen throughout the series was 2F-3567 (1966). Some changes were made during the run of the series, including different license plates (TP-3567; BT-1 and BAT-1), removal of the Futura steering wheel and substitution with a 1958 Edsel steering wheel, and the addition of extra gadgets such as a net in the trunk, remote-controlled driving, a rear-facing camera under the turbine exhaust port, and the Bat Ram.

==== Exhibition ====
Barris built two fiberglass copies of the original Batmobile for exhibition on the car show circuit and a third for exhibition drag racing. Eventually, the three copies (and the screen-used metal Futura Batmobile) were covered with a black velvet "fuzz" paint, presumably to hide stress cracks in the fiberglass bodies. Later, all three were restored to their gloss black paint job. The three replicas are all based on a 1965–1966 Ford Galaxie. The #1 Barris-built Batmobile sold at Barrett-Jackson Auctions on January 19, 2013, for $4,620,000,. The three Barris copies all reside in private collections, including the exhibition drag racing version driven by wheelstanding driver Wild Bill Shrewsberry. This car was built with a dual-quad Holman Moody Ford 427 V8 engine, Art Carr-prepared Ford C6 automatic transmission and 5.14 gears in the rear end. Quarter-mile times were in the mid-12 second range, primarily because Shrewsberry would launch the car in second gear and smoke the overinflated rear tires for show down most of the strip. The "rocket exhaust" was made functional via a tank filled with either gasoline or kerosene which was pumped out the exhaust port and ignited electrically.

- The #1 Barris-built Batmobile, built from the original 1955 Lincoln Futura concept car, was purchased by Richard Champagne of Ahwatukee, Arizona at the Barrett-Jackson Auction in January 2013 for $4,620,000. It was subsequently purchased privately by Dr. David Anderson, owner of Batmobile #2, for an undisclosed sum.
- The #2 Barris-built Batmobile is owned by Dr. David Anderson of Virginia, and has not been repaired or restored. Original purchase price was $225,000.
- The #3 Barris-built Batmobile was purchased and restored by Dennis M. Danzik of Paradise Valley, Arizona. It was reportedly purchased for $600,000. Danzik also owns the majority of the Warner Brothers 1989 Batmobile.
- The #4 Barris-built Batmobile is owned by Doug Jackson, and is located in Southern California.
- The so-called #5 Batmobile, originally built by Jim Sermersheim (on a 1958 Thunderbird chassis) was owned by George Barris until 1989. It went for sale on JamesEdition in June 2017 for an asking price of $250,000.

==== Replicas ====
In October 2010, DC Comics authorized Fiberglass Freaks in Logansport, Indiana, to build officially licensed 1966 Batmobile replicas. These replicas have been sold to customers in England, Italy, Canada, and across the U.S. One of Fiberglass Freaks' 1966 Batmobile replicas sold at an RM auction for $216,000. Fiberglass Freaks' owner Mark Racop has been a 1966 Batman fan since he was two years old, and he built his first 1966 Batmobile replica when he was seventeen.

A replica of the Barris-built, TV Batmobile was displayed alongside two of the later film versions of the Batmobile at the Cars of the Stars Motor Museum in Keswick, Cumbria, England for several years. When the museum owner, a Keswick dentist, took delivery of the original car, he drove it through the streets of the town where it was promptly seized by the police. A hilarious newspaper photo showed the Batmobile being driven away by a uniformed, British 'bobby.' In 2011 the entire collection was sold to the American collector Michael Dezer for his Miami Auto Museum.

- A replica Batmobile was sold at the Coys Spring Classic Cars Auction on February 27, 2007, at the Royal Horticultural Hall in London. Coys Auctions had said it expected the car to fetch more than £75,000 – the final and closing bid was £119,000, equivalent to US$233,000 at the time.
- A replica of the Barris-built Batmobile is owned by Andreas Ugland. He bought the Batmobile at a London car auction in 2007. Both Batmobile and Batcycle at the London car auction were replicas. It is displayed at the Cayman Motor Museum.
- Hobbyists have built a number of duplicates of the TV Batmobile, sharing sources for parts and assembly kits.
- A functional replica of the Batmobile was finished in 2010 in Arboga, Sweden, for a reality show to be shot in the United States. In 2011, the vehicle, valued to 4 million SEK (more than US$600,000) was reported stolen, and is currently (March 2013) unlocated.

==== Other appearances ====
- In the 1980 low budget science fiction comedy Galaxina, the Batmobile is seen parked on the street of a western styled town on an alien planet with unusual daylight effects.
- In the film Rock Star, Mark Wahlberg's character is given to extravagant spending; one of his first purchases is the original Batmobile from the TV series.
- The episode "Mr. Plow" of The Simpsons guest-starred Adam West with the Batmobile at an auto show, with West later driving the car. The later episode "Beyond Blunderdome" featured the Batmobile in a museum of famous cars next to Herbie the Love Bug and a car from Mad Max. The latter episode featured a live Batman and Robin in the vehicle, who had both tried poorly to conceal the fact that they were not dummies.
- On an episode of The Man Show, a guest won a ride in the Batmobile with Adam West in the "Wheel of Destiny" segment.
- The Lincoln Futura version of the Batmobile appears in The Benchwarmers.
- The Batmobile appears as an Easter Egg in the video game King's Quest II: Romancing the Throne, accompanied by a version of the 1966 TV theme.
- In 2003, Adam West and Burt Ward reunited for a tongue-in-cheek telefilm titled Return to the Batcave: The Misadventures of Adam and Burt which combined dramatized recreations of the filming of the original series (with younger actors standing in for the stars), with modern-day footage of West and Ward searching for a stolen Batmobile.
- In issue 9 of the comic series Justice (February 2007), Batman dons a suit of armor visually influenced by the original Batmobile from the TV series.

=== 1966 promotional tours ===
When the TV spin-off film Batman was released in 1966, the studio decided to recreate the Batmobile for promotional purposes in the UK. For this purpose, a 1958 Chevrolet Bel Air, Impala, four-door sedan had its roof completely removed and replaced with the iconic double-bubble top. The rear doors were sealed, the remaining small front doors making it difficult to get in and out. Body modifications were quickly carried out by riveting aluminum additions over the original bodywork. Black and orange paint, plus decals, completed a passable replica that was street-legal on UK roads. Once its use for promotional purposes was complete, the car was delivered to a scrapyard.

=== Batman (1989 film) and Batman Returns ===
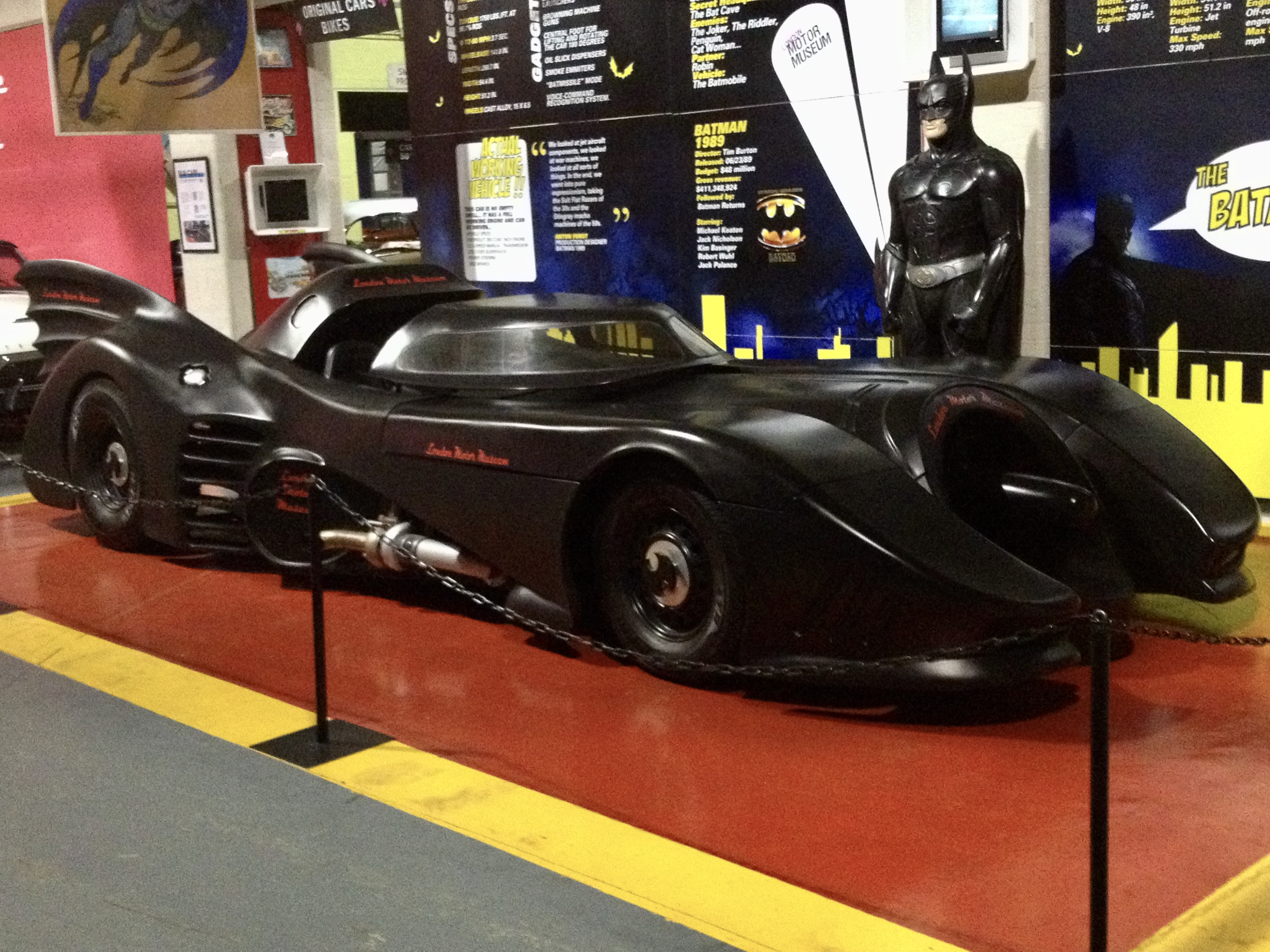
Fan made replica exhibited at an event.

Tim Burton's live-action films Batman (1989) and Batman Returns (1992) presented a different version of the Batmobile, which reflected those films' Art Deco version of Gotham City. The car was designed by conceptual illustrator Julian Caldow and built by John Evans special effects team at Pinewood Studios in England. The body of the car was sculpted out of foam by Keith Short in collaboration with Eddie Butler and the fiberglass work being done by John Lovell. It was long, low, and sleek, and was built on a Chevrolet Impala chassis. Two cars in total were built for the film. The back of the Batmobile resembles the back of the Fiat Turbina, which was a gas-turbine concept from the 1950s. For Batman Returns in 1992, Carl Casper and Tom Oberhaus of Hollywood Productions were contracted to build 3 Batmobiles for principal photography. Carl Casper retained the number 1 hero car until recently (2021). That car is now in a private collection in California. The number 2 car was last known to be in a private collection in Japan since 1992. The number 3 car is owned by comedian Jeff Dunham.

==== Technical specifications ====
- Length: 260.7 inches (6.62 m)
- Width: 94.4 inches (2.40 m)
- Height: 51.2 inches (1.30 m)
- Wheelbase: 141.0 inches (3.58 m)
- Wheels: Cast alloy, 15 in × 6.5 in
- Tires: High aspect L60-15
- Acceleration: 0–60 mph in 3.7 seconds
- Maximum Top Speed: 330 miles per hour (530 km/h) with jet booster
- Maximum Turn Speed: 45 miles per hour (72 km/h) with grappling hook
- Maximum Jump Distance: 7,270 feet (2,220 m)
- Engine: 10,000 horsepower (7,500 kW) Jet Turbine
- Fuel: High octane; 97% special (gasoline paraffin mixture)
- Torque: 1,750 pound force-feet (2,370 N⋅m) at 98.7% ROS
- Launchers: Side-mounted grappling hook
- Carjack: Central "foot" capable of lifting the car and rotating it 180°.

==== Features ====
Spherical bombs could be deployed from its sides. An afterburner was housed in the back. Two M1919 Browning machine guns were hidden behind flaps in each fender. Its grappling hook, once hooked on a structure, serves as an anchor to allow the batmobile to make an extremely sharp turn at high speed that its pursuers typically cannot duplicate. It had super hydraulic for course changes, and a Batdisc ejector (side-mounted) that could fire precisely 15 Batdiscs in the 1-second pulse. Other gadgets included chassis-mounted shinbreakers, oil slick dispensers and smoke emitters. Inside, the two-seat cockpit featured aircraft-like instrumentation, a passenger's side monitor, self-diagnostics system, CD recorder, and voice-command recognition system. In Batman Returns it is shown to have a secondary mode referred to as the "Batmissile", where the wheels would retract inward and the sides of the vehicle would break off, converting the car into a thin bullet train-like form capable of squeezing through tight alleyways. Obviously, this secondary mode would require the car to be reassembled and significantly repaired.

The Batmobile's shields are made of ceramic fractal armor panels. They explode outward when struck by projectiles, deflecting injurious force away from the car and its occupants. If Batman must leave the Batmobile for an extended period of time, he can, through a voice command spoken into a wrist device (specifically, the word "shields"), activate the Batmobile's shielding system. This prevents anyone from tampering with the vehicle while it is left unattended. Bulletproof and fireproof steel armor plates envelop the body and cockpit entirely. While this armor is in place, the vehicle cannot be driven. In Batman the shields were not fully functioning. In reality, a life-size model was built, and the shield activation sequence was created with stop motion animation technology. In Batman Returns, the shields held the same characteristics. However, the design was slimmer and the special effects were provided by computer-generated imagery. In shield mode, a small but powerful bomb can be deployed.

==== Other appearances ====
- A series of Onstar TV advertisements featured this particular Batmobile being equipped with the system. OnStar allowed Batman to call various Gotham characters, summon police, remotely unlock the vehicle's doors and find the nearest jet fuel station.
- This version of the Batmobile was later seen in the Lois & Clark: The New Adventures of Superman episode called "Don't Tug on Superman's Cape", an episode which shows that some collectors had apparently stolen the Batmobile.
- In the film Looney Tunes: Back in Action, Daffy Duck drives the Tim Burton version of the Batmobile into the water tower on the Warner Bros. studio lot, causing it to fall over and nearly crush Jenna Elfman's character.
- On the TV series Animaniacs, the Tim Burton version of the Batmobile approaches the WB studios front gates, the guard at the door greets the driver by saying "Good afternoon Mr. Keaton". Another Animaniacs cartoon features a parody of the poem 'Twas the Night Before Christmas. As the WB studios empty out for the Christmas break, the Tim Burton version of the Batmobile pulls up to the gate, and Ralph the Guard waves it through, saying, "Goodnight, Mr. Keaton, that's a lovely sedan". In a third Animaniacs appearance, Dot Warner's interpretation of a Puck soliloquy from A Midsummer Night's Dream renders the line, "And Robin shall make amends ere long" as "And the Boy Wonder will save us". The Tim Burton version of the Batmobile then drives up to the Warner siblings and opens its canopy; Robin pulls the trio into the car, which departs, saving them from an angry fairy.
- In the "RPM" episode of the animated series The Batman, one of Bruce Wayne's Batmobile prototypes is the Batmobile from the Tim Burton films.
- In the animated film Batman: Gotham Knight segment "Working Through Pain", Alfred uses the 1989 Batmobile to pull the sewer gate to rescue Batman trapped underneath.
- In the Arrowverse crossover event "Crisis on Infinite Earths", the Tim Burton version of the Batmobile makes a brief appearance in the Earth-99 Batcave.
- The 1992 Tim Burton "hero car" is now owned and held in a private collection in Southern California. This is the "Movie Car-1. Previously this car was in the builders' private collection.
- The vehicle had a cameo appearance in the 2023 film The Flash.
- In the Batwheels kids tv show, the main character is based on Tim Burtons's Batmobile, with some small differences.
- This version of the Batmobile (as well as the Batplane from the 89 Batman's film) appears in Teen Titans Go!.
- The film DC League of Super-Pets features a Batmobile clearly inspired by Tim Burton's version.
- Also featured in Lego Masters S5 E6 – Batman driven by Will Arnett.

==== Replicas ====
- The only actual turbine-powered Batmobile in existence is a replica of the 1989 film car. It is powered by a military Boeing turboshaft engine driving the rear wheels through a 4 speed semi-automatic transmission and is street registered. This car was designed and constructed by Casey Putsch of Putsch Racing in 2011.
- In Pune, India, a replica of the car was spotted in June 2015.
- Replicas of the Tim Burton-era Batmobiles are on display in front of several Batman: The Ride roller coasters and also in the street near Batman Adventure – The Ride 2 at Warner Bros. Movie World in Australia.
- Historic auto attractions in Roscoe, Illinois displays a replica Batmobile from Batman Returns as well as the "Batmissile" in addition to a replica of the Batmobile from the 1960s television series.
- A replica was spotted at the Al Barsha area of Dubai, the United Arab Emirates in October 2020.

=== Batman Forever ===
The Batmobile from Batman Forever (1995)

As the Batman films were handed over to director Joel Schumacher from Tim Burton, the design for the Batmobile was updated. Tim Flattery drew the winning design. Decorative lighting was added to the vehicle's rims, sides, and front edge, and the wing-shaped fins reached further into the air. The car had a few unique features, such as being able to rotate its wheels through 90 degrees so that it could move in a perpendicular direction, a grappling hook allowing the Batmobile to drive up walls, and the speed to perform large jumps from surface to surface during chases across Gotham City's elevated freeways and gigantic statues.

The Batman Forever Batmobile's ability to drive up walls was displayed as Batman eludes a dead-end provided by Two-Face and his henchmen. Later in the film, Dick Grayson takes the Batmobile for a joy ride without Batman's permission or awareness. Ultimately, it was destroyed when the Riddler deposited a sack full of explosives in the cockpit.

The design of the Batmobiles of the Schumacher films have garnered criticism for allegedly resembling giant phalli.

==== Technical specifications ====
The Batman Forever Batmobile had a Chevrolet 350 ZZ3 high-performance motor. The body is made from a high-temperature epoxy-fiberglass laminate. The wheelbase is 118 in. (118 inches (3.0 m)), the average car wheelbase measures around 103 (USDOT Data 1980–2000) inches. In all, its size was 300 in long and 126 in high. Carbon fiber was used to build the body of this particular Batmobile. The specifications for the Batmobile in this film are:

- Length: 300 in (7.62 m)
- Width: 94.4 in
- Height: 126 in (3.20 m)
- Maximum speed: 330 mph with booster
- Engine: 350 hp (est.), 350 cu in ZZ3 Chevrolet V8 engine, automatic transmission, custom front and rear suspension.
- Wheelbase: 118 in
- Tires: pivotable

==== Features ====
The Batmobile depicted in Batman Forever (1995) sought to accentuate its intricate lines. To do this, the filmmakers equipped it with engine panels, wheels, and undercarriage that were indirectly lit so that they appeared to glow blue. The Batman Forever car also had a split cockpit canopy, separate fenders, and jet exhaust. The roof fin could be opened into a "V" shape for a more contemporary look, though the only time this was shown is during the scene when Dick Grayson is taking the car out for a joyride through the city. The wheels were made to keep the bat emblems upright when the wheels are turning. The bat-emblem on the hubcaps was a counter-rotating gear that transferred into a stationary point. The two-seat cockpit featured a rear-view monitor, system diagnostics display, and custom gauge cluster. H. R. Giger was chosen to design the Batmobile in the very early stages of production. Schumacher's crew was unable to understand how they could construct a functional version. Only two sketches and an early blueprint were completed.

There were two primary avoidance/defense features on the Batman Forever version. First, it had the ability to lock all four wheels perpendicular to its centerline, to allow for quick sideways movement. Second, for more dire circumstances, the Batmobile could reroute the jet exhaust to under its front end and launch grappling cables at overhead anchors. With the nose up and the lines in place, the car could climb sheer vertical surfaces like building walls as if it were driving on flat ground.

==== Other appearances ====
- In episode 53 of the TV series The Drew Carey Show, Drew Carey won the Batman Forever version of the Batmobile as a prize. Lewis and Oswald take it on a joyride dressed as Batman and Robin without Drew's permission. Diedrich Bader, who portrayed Oswald, would later go on to voice Batman in Batman: The Brave and the Bold.
- In The New Batman Adventures episode "Legends of the Dark Knight", three teenagers discuss their ideas about what Batman is really like. They briefly meet a boy named Joel, whose idea of Batman consists mainly of a fascination with the tight rubber suits and a Batmobile that can drive up walls (as seen in Batman Forever). The other three children treat Joel's ideas with disdain.
- In the 2011 remake of the comedy film Arthur, Arthur drives the Batman Forever version of the Batmobile.

=== Batman & Robin (1997 film) ===
A new Batmobile is seen in the 1997 film Batman & Robin. The last Batmobile to appear in the motion picture series, was designed by Harald Belker. It is prominently featured in one scene in which, as Batman and Robin are in pursuit, Mr. Freeze shoots the underside of the car for several seconds with a freeze-gun, before the car crash-lands. In the next scene in the Batcave, the Batmobile appears undamaged.

==== Technical specifications ====
In Batman & Robin, the aerodynamic chassis design and "T" axis wheelbase provided the Batmobile counterbalance gyrometric stability, allowing for high velocity 90-degree turns at speeds greater than 70 mph without losing momentum. Initial plans had the Batmobile being able to transform into the "Bathammer" vehicle seen in this film, but were abandoned. The specifications for the Batmobile in this film are as follows:

- Length: 396 in (33 feet (10 m)) long. The six flame columns formed a V-shaped output of 71 in (1.80 m) length.
- Height: 59.05 in (1.5 m)
- Maximum Speed: 230 mph on open road, 350 mph with afterburner thrust; TFX road tested the Batmobile at 140 mph. 350 km/h and the additional jet propulsion brings the cars to 530 km/h.
- Engine: Chevy 350 ZZ3 (off-road racing motor). Instead of a single jet exhaust, this Batmobile had a "boattail" rear flanked by separate fenders, each with three smaller exhaust nozzles.
- Axle Base: 388 in
- Tires: It rode on custom 22" wheels with prototype, 55 in GoodYear tires with Batsymbols in the treads.

==== Features ====
The second Schumacher era Batmobile featured neither a passenger seat nor a canopy. Like the Batman Forever car, this Batmobile (which was designed by Harald Belker) featured light-up wheels and engine panels. The displays were much more involved with this car, however, with red, orange, yellow, and blue lights, as well as special pulsating lights in the counter-rotating turbine intake.

The nozzles were canted away from the centerline of the car slightly, so the final effect was that the six exhausts made a "V" pattern to keep the car pointed straight ahead. A bat mask was incorporated onto the nose of the car, although the sculpted lines made it somewhat difficult to make out at first. The fins were unmistakable and remain as the largest set ever built into a real-world Batmobile. On the Batman & Robin version the arsenal of weaponry and gadgets is controlled by an onboard voice-activated computer that surrounds the single-seat cockpit. From behind the wheel, the driver has access to a multifunctioning key command response system that delivers immediate weapon activation during an attack and defensive procedures. The Batman & Robin version of the Batmobile was equipped with dual-mount, sub carriage rocket launchers, front and rear grappling hooks, multipoint infrared and laser scan tracking units, anterior/posterior wheel-based axle bombs, catapult ejection seat, and disguised central carriage, which detaches to become an emergency road vehicle. The single-seat cockpit featured a two-way video conferencing screen, radar unit, and Redbird communication switch.

=== The Dark Knight trilogy ===
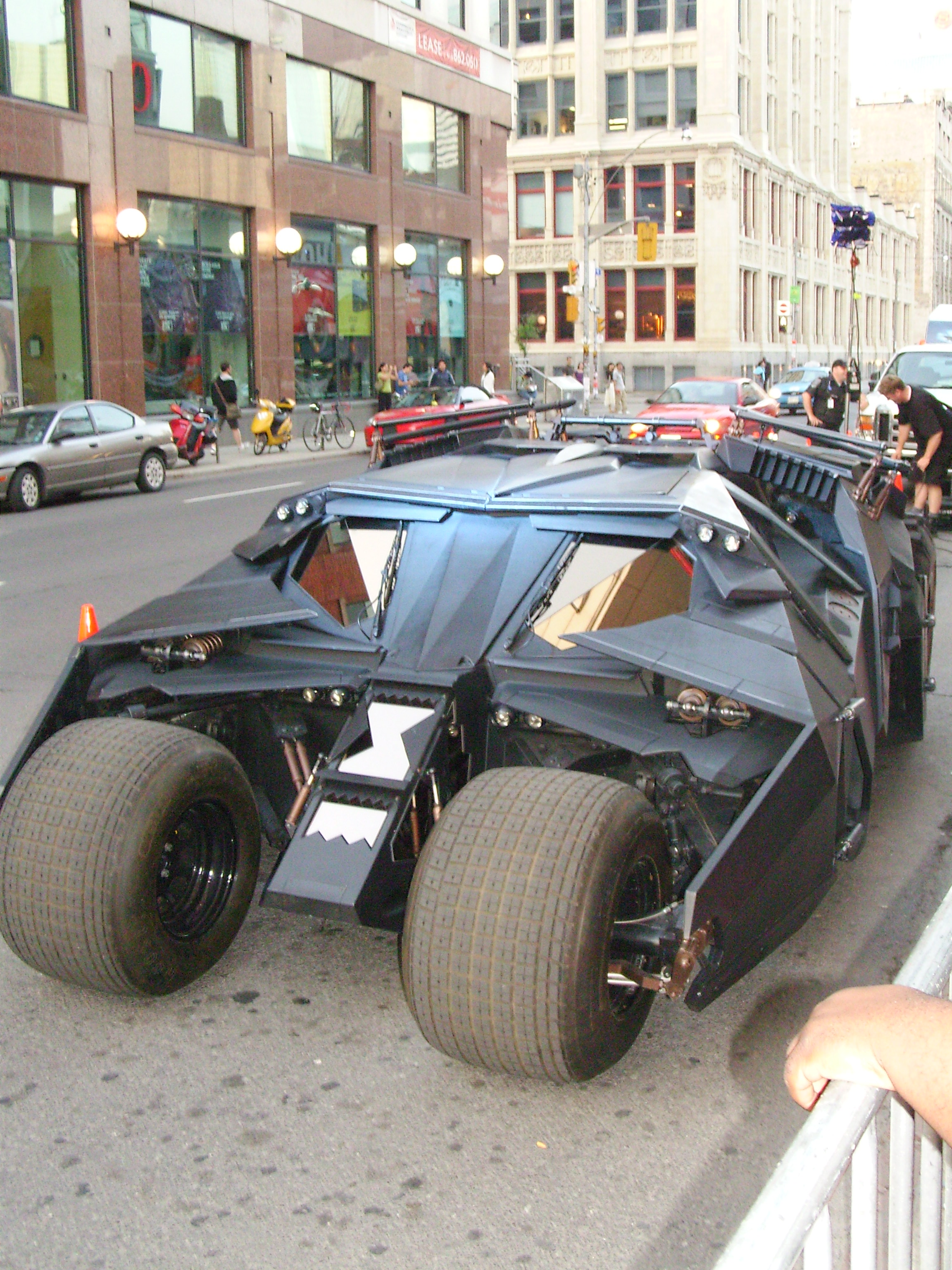
The "Tumbler" Batmobile from The Dark Knight Trilogy

The Batmobile depicted in Christopher Nolan's trilogy of Batman films owes much to the tank-like vehicle from Frank Miller's Batman: The Dark Knight Returns; it has a more "workhorse" appearance than the sleek automobiles seen in previous incarnations, designed for functionality and intimidation. While the films never refer to the vehicle as the "Batmobile", it is still referred to as such in the scripts. The film's production designer described the machine as a cross between a Lamborghini and a tank.

In Batman Begins (2005), Bruce Wayne utilizes the prototype vehicle known as the Tumbler designed by Wayne Enterprises' Applied Sciences Division as a bridging vehicle for the military. It includes weaponry and the ability to boost into a rampless jump. The Tumbler's armor is strong enough to break through concrete barriers without sustaining significant damage. Two full-sized driving versions were used in exterior shots while another full-sized model with hydraulic enhancements was used in jump sequences. A further full-sized, functional version carried propane tanks to fuel the rocket blast out of the rear nozzle. A radio controlled, 1/3-scale electric model also performed stunts in the film including the rooftop chase sequence. Six vehicles were built for the production of the film.

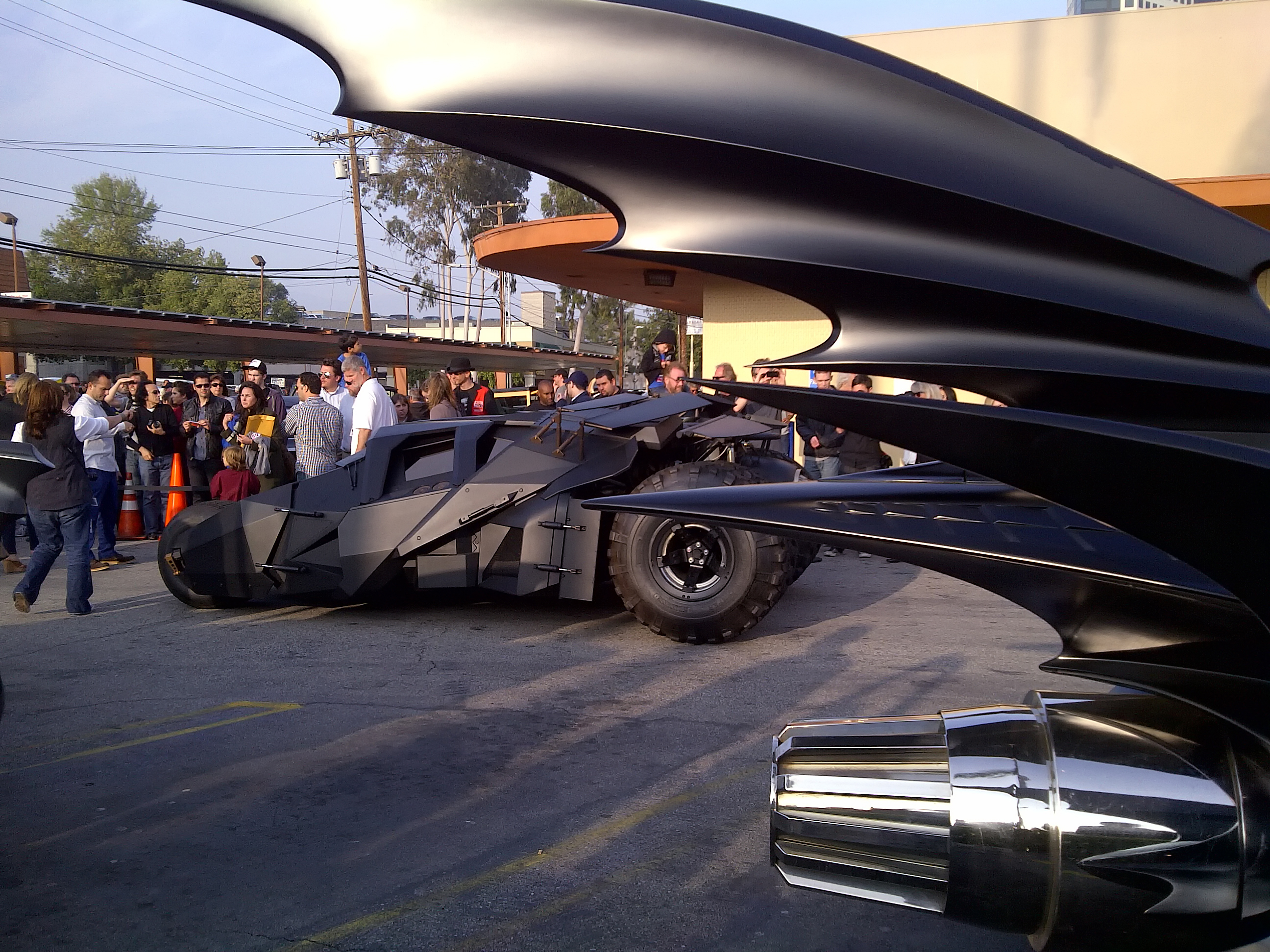
Schumacher with the Batmobile from the Dark Knight Trilogy, near Warners

In The Dark Knight (2008), the Tumbler returns and appears twice in the film: where Batman captures the Scarecrow, and in a chase where it is damaged by an RPG fired by the Joker in an attempt to kill Harvey Dent. This causes the Tumbler to crash and Batman to eject from it in the Batpod (a motorcycle formed by the front wheels and struts of the Tumbler) as part of a self-destruct sequence that sees the remainder of the vehicle explode. The Tumbler is also seen in the trailers in a deleted scene, exiting the improvised Batcave.

The Dark Knight Rises (2012) reveals a further complement of the unmodified Tumbler prototypes sequestered underneath Wayne Enterprises, which are commandeered by Bane's League of Shadows to terrorize Gotham after Batman's defeat. One of the Tumblers fires at a crowd of police before their battle with Bane, only for the Bat to intercept the shot. A trio of Tumblers continuously escorts the neutron bomb used to hold the city hostage, but are destroyed by Batman using the Bat and Selina Kyle using the Batpod.

==== Technical specifications ====
Overview

- Length: 15 feet 2 inches (4.62 m)
- Width: 9 feet 2 inches (2.79 m)
- Height: 4 feet 11 inches (1.50 m)
- Weight: 2.5 short tons (2.3 t)
- Acceleration: 0–60 mph (0-96.6 km/h) in 5.6 seconds.
- Maximum top speed: 160 miles per hour (260 km/h)
- Maximum turn speed: 19 miles per hour (31 km/h)
- Maximum jump distance: 1,719 feet (524 m)
- Engine: 5.7 litre GM V8 engine capable of 500 horsepower (370 kW).
- Fuel: The "jet engine" on the back of the car was fed by propane tanks.
- Tires: 4 Interco "Super Swamper TSL" tires standing 44/18.5-16.5 in the rear, and two 94.0/15.0-15 Hoosier Checkerboard dirt tires on the front, with superior grip.

==== Features ====
The Christopher Nolan version of the Batmobile has a pair of autocannons mounted in the nose of the car between the front wheels. In "Attack" mode, the driver's seat moves to the center of the car, and the driver is repositioned to lie face-down with his head in the center section between the front wheels. This serves two main purposes: first, it provides more substantial protection with the driver shielded by multiple layers of armor plating. Second, the low-down, centralized driving position makes extreme precision maneuvers easier to perform, while lying prone reduces the risk of injury a driver faces when making these maneuvers. Other devices included:

- Rear flaps to assist brakes
- Dual front autocannons
- Rocket launcher
- Landing hook to sprung landing stabilization
- Integrated fire-extinguishing system
- Integrated safety connection to gasoline control
- Jet engine (with afterburners) on back of vehicle for quick boosts/"rampless" jumps
- Stealth mode avoids detection using a variety of stealth technologies that reduce reflection/emission of radar, infrared, visible light, radio-frequency (RF) spectrum, and audio; the car's lights and main engine are deactivated; the vehicle is powered by an auxiliary electric motor. This makes the car very hard to find at night or in dark places, and as demonstrated by the car chase in Batman Begins, can easily throw off pursuers.
- Explosive caltrops are deployed from the rear of the vehicle, which can impair any vehicles that make contact with them.
- The front of the car is heavily armored, so the car can ram as a practical offensive attack, and also protects the driver while in the prone driving position/"Attack" mode
- Both front wheels can eject when the vehicle is damaged to form the Batpod, a motorcycle-like vehicle (the rest self-destructs).
- The new Tumblers are modified with experimental weapons:
  - A set of missile launchers
  - A retractable artillery cannon on a turret

==== Production process ====
The new incarnation of the Tumbler was proposed by Nolan after he built a proof-of-concept model design out of Play-Doh – a model he admitted looked "very very crude, more like a croissant than a car". Nathan Crowley, one of the production designers for Batman Begins, then started the process of designing the Tumbler for the film by model bashing based on that shape. One of the parts that Crowley used to create the vehicle was the nose cone of a P-38 Lightning model to serve as the chassis for the car's jet engine. Six models of the Tumbler were built to 1:12 scale in the course of four months. Following the scale model creation, a crew of over 30 people, including Crowley and engineers Chris Culvert and Andy Smith, carved a full-size replica of the vehicle out of a large block of Styrofoam, which was a process that lasted two months.

The Styrofoam model was used to create a steel "test frame", which had to stand up to several standards: have a speed of over 100 mph, go from 0 to 60 mph (97 km/h) in 5 seconds, possess a steering system to make sharp turns at city corners, and to withstand a self-propelled launch of up to 30 feet (9.1 m). On the first jump test, the Tumbler's front end collapsed and had to be completely rebuilt. The basic configuration of the newly designed vehicle included a 5.7-liter Chevy V8 engine, a truck axle for the rear axle, front racing tires by Hoosier, rear 4×4 mud tires by Interco and the suspension system of Baja racing trucks. The design and development process took nine months and cost several million dollars.

With the design process completed, four street-ready cars were constructed. Each vehicle possessed 65 carbon fiber panels and cost $250,000 to build. Two of the four cars were specialized versions. One version was the flap version, which had hydraulics and flaps to detail the close-up shots where the vehicle propelled itself through the air. The other version was the jet version, in which an actual jet engine was mounted onto the vehicle, fueled by six propane tanks. Due to the poor visibility inside the vehicle by the driver, monitors were connected to cameras on the vehicle body. The professional drivers for the Tumblers practiced driving the vehicles for six months before they drove on the streets of Chicago for the film's scenes.

The interior was an immobile studio set and not actually the interior of a street-capable version. The cockpit was oversized to fit cameras for scenes filmed in the Tumbler interior. In addition, another version of the car was a miniature model that was 1:3 scale of the full-sized one. This miniature model had an electric motor and was used to show it flying across ravines and between buildings. However, a full-size car was used for the waterfall sequence. The scale model scenes were filmed on a massive set built on a stage at Shepperton Studios in England over the course of nine weeks. The full-sized vehicles were driven and filmed on the streets of Chicago. In The Dark Knight, the Batpod ejects from the Tumbler, with the Tumbler's front wheels as the Batpod's wheels; this was rendered using computer-generated imagery when attempts to achieve the separation through practical effects proved impossible.

=== DC Extended Universe ===
The Batmobile in Batman v Superman: Dawn of Justice (2016)

According to the Warner Bros. Studios lot, the Batman v Superman: Dawn of Justice Batmobile combined inspiration from both the sleek, streamlined design of classic Batmobiles and the high-suspension, military build from the more recent Tumbler from The Dark Knight Trilogy. They were also inspired by the 1989 Batmobile. Designed by production designer Patrick Tatopoulos and Dennis McCarthy, the Batmobile is about 20 feet long and 12 feet wide. Unlike previous Batmobiles, it has a Gatling gun sitting on the front and the back tires are shaved down tractor tires. The Batmobile elevates itself for scenes depicting it going into battle or when performing jumps and lowers to the ground when cruising through the streets. The Batmobile appears in a flashback for Suicide Squad, when Batman was pursuing the Joker and Harley Quinn before their car crashed into the river, the Joker escaping while Harley was captured.

In the 2017 film Justice League and its 2021 director's cut, Batman owns a new four-legged tank-vehicle called the "Knightcrawler", which was designed by his father during World War II. The Crawler is used in the fight against Steppenwolf to rescue S.T.A.R. Labs scientists (including Cyborg's father Silas Stone) underneath an abandoned Gotham Harbor. Near the end, the new team board the portable troop carrier aka "Flying Fox" carrying the new armored Batmobile to battle Steppenwolf in Pozharnov, Russia.

The 2019 DCEU film Shazam! features an animated end credits sequence in which Bruce Wayne was shown changing into his Batman costume in Wayne Manor, before breaking through a window and chasing after the Batmobile, which was stolen by Shazam.

==== Technical specifications ====
Overview

- Length: 240 inches (6.1 m)
- Width: 144 inches (3.7 m)
- Height: 48 inches (1.2 m)
- Weight: 7,000 lbs
- Acceleration: Unknown
- Top speed: 205 miles per hour (330 km/h)
- Maximum turn speed: 19 miles per hour (31 km/h)
- Maximum jump distance: 2,822 feet (860 m)
- Engine: Unknown
- Fuel: Unknown
- Tires: 500lbsx4
- Suspension: One-off airbag over a bypass shock system

Arsenal

- Grappling hook, countermeasures, machine gun
- Twin .50 caliber machine guns
- Fully armored
- Stealth-capable
- Active protection systems / anti-ballistics
- 8500 lbs
- BVS-20418-CC 900 55e9de20f38270.44527475

Defense systems

- Electrified skin deterrent
- Concealment smoke grenade launcher system
- Antiroll system
- Shield generator housing
- Jamming signals system
- Sensor assembly
- Laser tracking assembly
- Ballistic missile defense system
- Electromagnetic pulse protection
- Grapple hook compartment
- Canopy

Modifications

- Vaporized kryptonite
- Infused kryptonite skin coating
- Direct kryptonite vapor trajectory system
- Kryptonite transit wave emitter
- Class 4 cell krip (modified secondary weapons bay)

Armament systems

- Heat ray crowd control dispersal cannon
- Main weapons bay
- Sound compliance non-lethal system
- Xenon stun/spot searchlights
- Secondary weapons bay
- 12.7 × 108 mm anti-material weapon
- Anti-material missile weapon
- 19 Cowcatcher

Miscellaneous component and systems

- Thrust vent (forward)
- Electronic stabilization
- Nitro-methane tank
- Immobilizer
- Muffler bearings
- Turbo-thrust kinetic ion pulse drives
- Turbine
- Dogleg gearbox
- Secondary nitro-methane tank
- Helicopter lifting hooks
- Exhaust ports
- Air-to-ground refueling (AGR)
- Gyro stabilization assembly (for the .50 caliber machine gun)

Tires

- Front: 400/55-225 (tractor tires). Kevlar reinforced belted type IV armor
- Rear: 700/50-225 (tractor tires). Kevlar reinforced belted type IV armor

==== Features ====
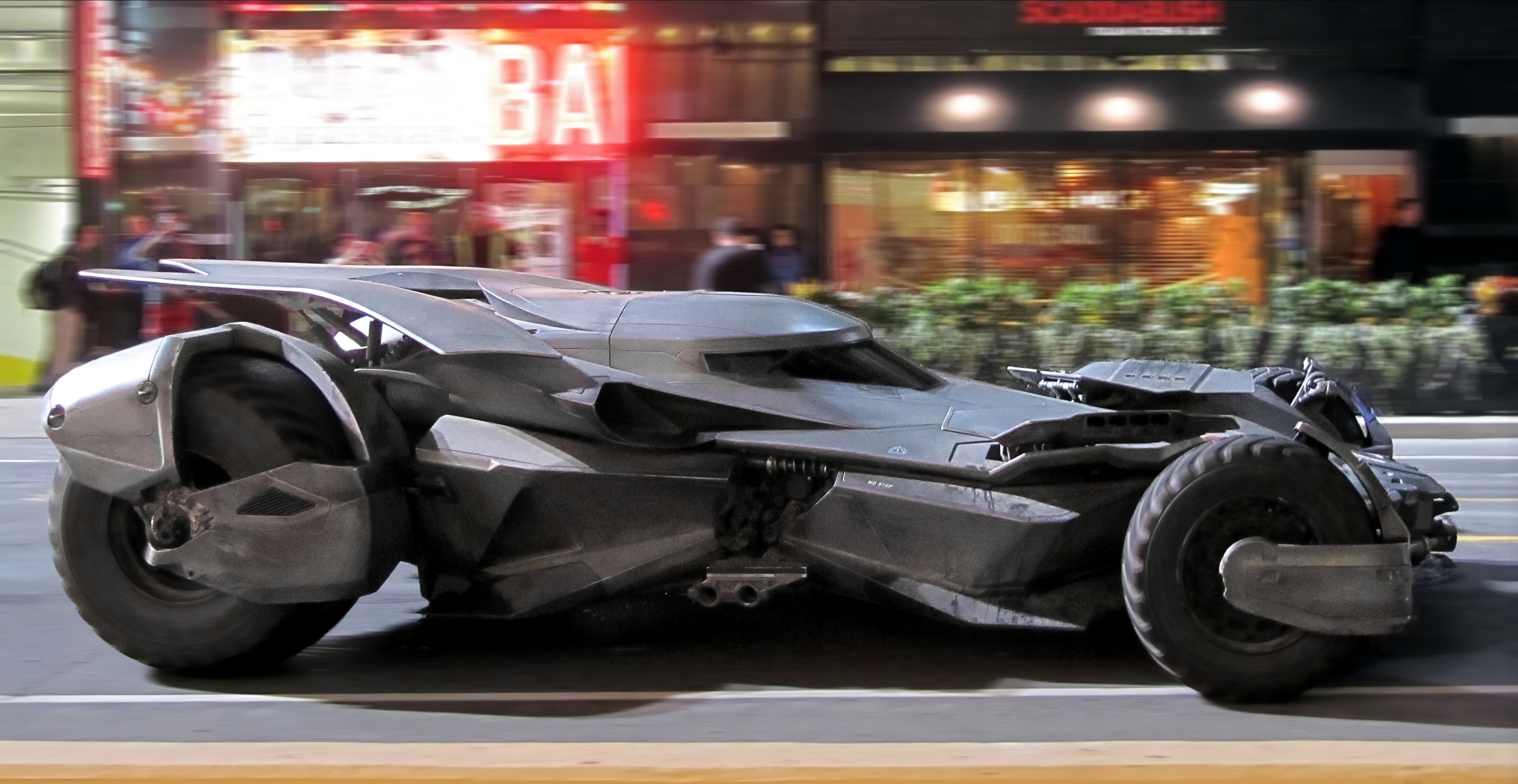
The Batmobile in Suicide Squad (2016)

In the DC Extended Universe, the Batmobile is depicted as a heavily armored assault vehicle, designed to emphasize Batman's militarized approach and the franchise's grounded visual style. The film portrays the car as capable of adjusting its suspension for different kinds of action sequences, including raised configurations for combat scenes and lowered positions for high-speed driving. Visual effects and practical design elements present the vehicle with a rear jet-style booster, used on screen to enhance the sense of rapid acceleration during pursuits and jumps. The exterior is shown as resistant to sustained gunfire, reinforcing the filmmakers’ intention to portray a machine built for front-line confrontation rather than stealth alone.

Production materials and promotional guides list approximate dimensions of 20 ft (6.1 m) in length and 12 ft (3.7 m) in width, with an estimated fictional top speed of 205 mph (330 km/h). These figures reflect the design team's efforts to create a Batmobile that combines elements of military prototypes with high-performance automotive styling. The on-screen version is described as weighing roughly 7,000 lb (3,200 kg), aligning with the vehicle's appearance as a hybrid between an armored car and a concept super-vehicle.

The vehicle's interior is styled after a fighter aircraft cockpit, consistent with the production team's utilitarian design philosophy. The cockpit layout features an array of switches, screens, and controls used to operate the fictional systems. Set decorators and prop designers also equipped the passenger side with a compartment resembling a compact armory, allowing Batman to access signature items such as Batarangs, grapple guns, and smoke grenades during key sequences.

For action scenes, the Batmobile is shown using a front-mounted, gimbal-style machine gun and a rear harpoon launcher, the latter featured pulling or disabling other vehicles on screen. Additional systems, including missile racks, flare countermeasures, and electrical deterrents along the exterior plating, were incorporated to expand the vehicle's tactical presence within the narrative. The films also depict the Batmobile as capable of limited autonomous operation, a cinematic device used to emphasize Bruce Wayne's access to advanced technology through Wayne Enterprises.

=== The Batman (2022) ===
The Batman's director Matt Reeves tweeted photos of the Batmobile for the film as a muscle car. With the bodywork of the car appearing to be a 1968 or 1970s Dodge Charger, the car is meant to be a pursuit and capture vehicle built entirely by Bruce in the Batcave under Wayne Tower.

At the start of the film, the car appears in the Batcave covered, while Bruce is working on assembling the car. In an interview with Empire magazine, Reeves also drew inspiration from the 1983 John Carpenter film Christine to give the Batmobile a horror-like presence.

The Batmobile has recesses on its hood which earlier were thought to be for machine guns, but are actually vents for the flame exhausts. These coupled with the exhaust pipes on the sides, and the hood which lights up as Batman is revving the car, give an intimidating appearance to onlookers and enemies alike. The car also has a jet afterburner built into the back, which apart from giving Batman a boost, also emits an unearthly shriek during its startup which Batman uses to intimidate his foes, as he does to the Penguin. The only flaw to this setup is that the back of the car housing the jet afterburner engine is exposed due to Bruce using the half-finished car later in the film. However the rest of the car, including the windows is heavily armored to the extent that bullets bounce off it, as shown when Penguin empties a magazine into the car but does not do any damage. The Batmobile also has four massive racing tires allowing for all terrain weather and driving conditions. The car is also shown to be durable enough to smash through wooden pallets and concrete cylinders without any damage, as well as being able to violently flip cars with its ram-like bumper, as done to the Penguin. Additionally, unlike the previous iterations of the Batmobile, and also owing to the half-finished nature of the car, this is the only Batmobile since the 1940s to not feature any gadgets beyond the armor, except for a customized car phone to make calls.

Four units were built for the film. The primary driving unit is powered by a V8 engine that generates 650 horsepower. Another unit was built on a Tesla chassis for indoor or night shots.

=== Gotham ===
At the beginning of the Season Four episode "A Dark Knight: That's Entertainment", Alfred takes Bruce to the garage at Wayne Manor on his seventeenth birthday to present him with his gift: a heavily fortified matte-black Ford Mustang that functions as a proto-Batmobile, the choice of make being a reference to the original Batmobile which was a modified Lincoln Futura and manufactured by Ford.

=== Batwoman ===
In the second season of Batwoman, Ryan Wilder, the new Batwoman, drives the Batmobile as her vehicle of choice.

== Popular culture ==
=== Copyright status ===
The Batmobile is copyrighted under United States law by DC Comics, a status often thought to usually be reserved to sentient fictional characters. This was established in court when a mechanic making Batmobile replicas roughly based on the 1960s Adam West version of the Batmobile was sued by DC Comics in 2011 in the case DC Comics v Mark Towle. The mechanic had argued that the Batmobile was a "functional" element of the show and thus ineligible for copyright; however, the court ruled that the Batmobile was an "automotive character" with its own style, backstory, and theme that remained consistent across versions: a "bat-like appearance" and "always contains the most up-to-date weaponry and technology". In addition, builder George Barris applied for and received a US Design Patent for the car in 1966. Although the patent expired in 1980, during its lifetime it served as the basis for Barris' successfully claiming ownership of the Jim Sermersheim "No. 5" Batmobile replica.

=== Toys ===
- Hot Wheels released a version of the 1960s Batman TV show's Batmobile, as well as the Batmobile from Batman and Batman Returns, the Tumbler from Nolan's Batman films, and the ones from Batman Forever, Batman & Robin, Batman: The Brave and the Bold, The Batman, Batman: The Animated Series, Arkham Asylum, Arkham Knight, Batman Live and some original Hot Wheels' Batmobiles.
- Corgi Toys of England has produced a wide range of Batmobiles ranging from the original sedan to the latest film Batmobiles. They also have produced a Batboat, Red Bird & Jokermobile for their diecast toy lines.
- Mego produced the Batmobile for its World's Greatest Superhero line in the 1970s. It could seat two 8 inch action figures. Figures Toy Company later produced a remake in the 2010s for their "World's Greatest Heroes" line.
- The Batmobile that was produced for Kenner's Super Powers Collection toyline allowed two figures to sit in it, had a battering ram grille, and trapping claw in the back.
- Eaglemoss released a magazine, 'Batman Automobilia' featuring models of most Batmobiles.
- Fanhome released a 1:8 scale partwork model of the 1966 Batmobile from the television show.
- Jada Toys released a 1:24 die-cast model kit of the Batmobile from the 2016 film Batman v Superman: Dawn of Justice, as well as the Batmobile from Batman TV show's, the Batmobile from Burton's Batman films and the Tumbler from Nolan's Batman films.
- Kinder Surprise released contemporary versions of Batmobile from comics in 2007 and 2014.
- Chupa Chups released Batmobile and Batwing from Batman v Superman film in 2016.
- Hot Toys has released multiple variations of the Batmobile from various live-action films and TV series. Currently, they are working on the Batman v Superman version, which is armed with various accessories and can fit up to two Hot Toys 1/6 scale figures at any given time.
- Plastic models of various Batmobiles, mostly in the 1/25th scale have been released by AMT (currently owned by Round 2) since the Adam West TV show. These include but are not limited to the 1960s TV show Batmobile (based on the Futura), the 1989 Tim Burton Batmobile, and the variation, the Batmissile. You can see most of these at Round 2 main home page or Home. Meanwhile, Moebius releases the Tumbler and the Batman v Superman Batmobile, also on a 1/25th scale.
- The Batmobile was released as part of the original Lego Batman toy line and its DC Universe Superheroes remake, with both sets featuring Two-Face and his armored truck. A Nolan-style Tumbler set—with 1869 pieces—was also released to tie in with The Dark Knight. This set included the Heath Ledger Joker.

=== Monster Jam ===
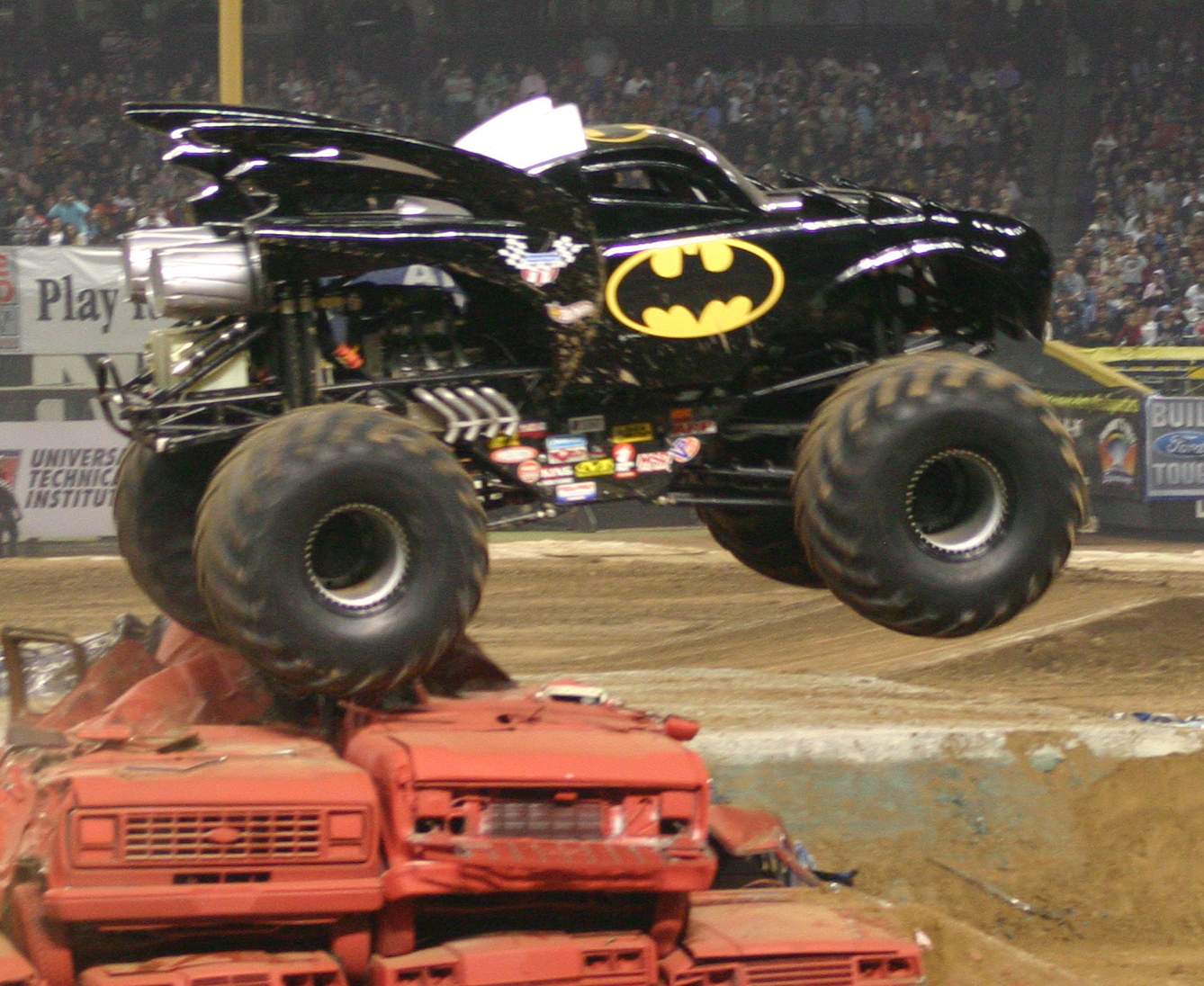
The Batman monster truck, competing in Phoenix, Arizona in 2006

In 2006, a Batman monster truck made its debut at Charlotte, 2006. This truck was designed after the Batmobile, with a pair of wings and afterburners in the back. It was a major competitor in the Monster Jam live tour, leading driver John Seasock to two consecutive racing wins at the 2007 and 2008 Monster Jam World Finals. In 2013, the truck's design was changed, with smaller wings, and the afterburners replaced with a large Bat-logo. The truck was retired in late 2014 after the DC license expired.

=== Kiddie rides ===
Kiddie's Manufacturing of Puerto Rico released a kiddie ride based on the Batman Forever Batmobile in 1995, for use in shopping malls and arcades. To this day, it is still a popular kiddie ride.

A later Batmobile kiddie ride, based on the one seen in Batman: The Brave and The Bold, was released in the late 2000s/early 2010s. This ride included Batman sitting in it.

== See also ==
- Batcycle
- BMW 3.0CSL – "Batmobile"
- Car body style
- George Barris
- Munster Koach

== Notes ==
In Batman & Robin, Batman uses the "Bathammer" to battle Mr. Freeze and his henchmen through the frozen streets of Gotham City. The Bathammer is, in essence, a Batmobile for travelling on icy surfaces. It is 33 feet (10 m) long and 6 feet (1.8 m) high. The top speed is 100 mph on ice. The Bathammer can move over enormous skids underneath. It also carries vertical stabilizers (3 m long) that can be directed upward in an emergency and used as shield.
