= Jim Buckmaster =

American businessman

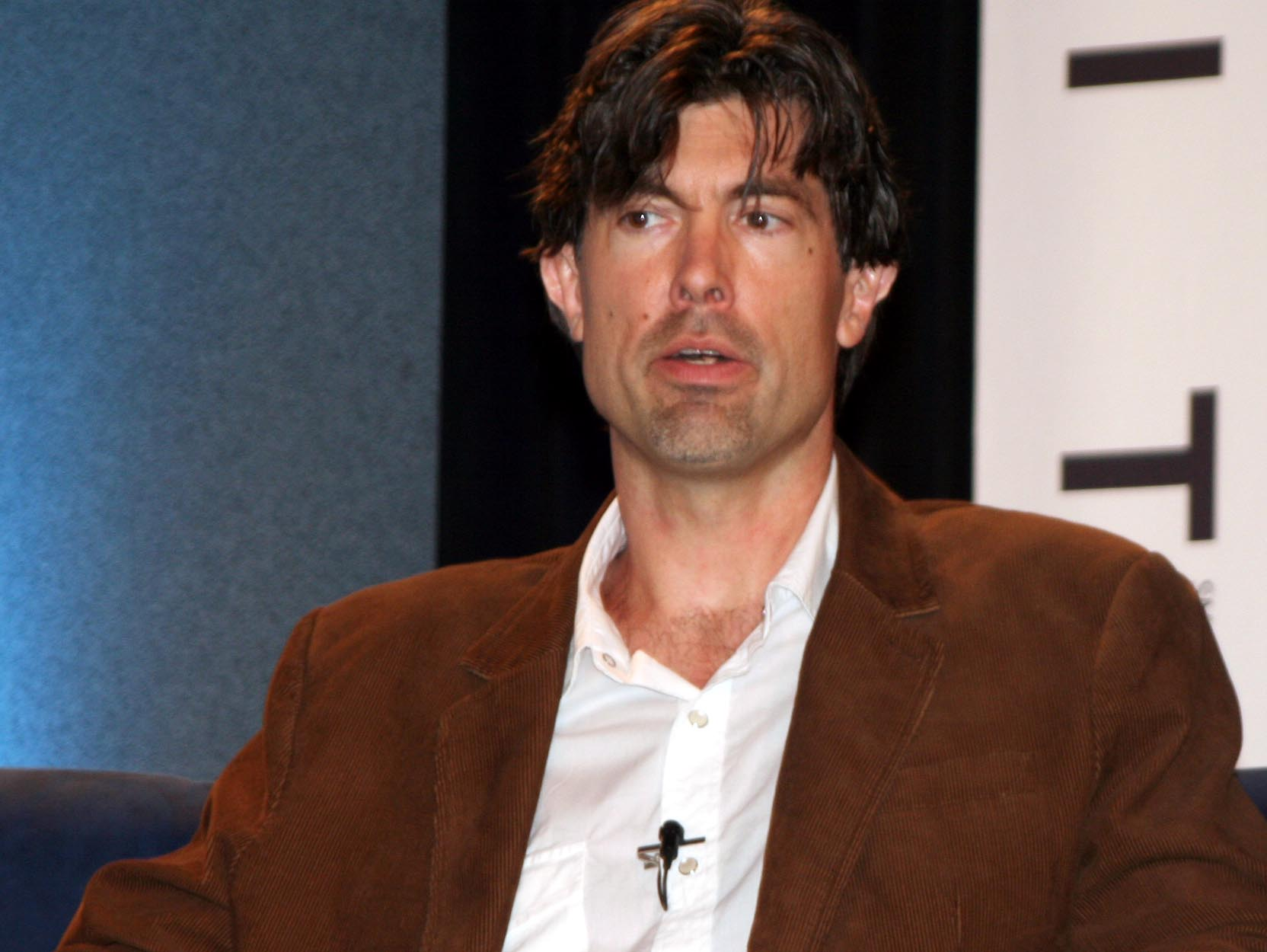
- Buckmaster at Web 2.0 Conference 2006
- Born: August 14, 1962 (age 64); Ann Arbor, Michigan, U.S.
- Education: Virginia Tech (BS); University of Michigan (no degree)
- Occupations: Computer programmer, CEO of craigslist
- Years active: 2000-present

Jim Buckmaster (born August 14, 1962) is an American computer programmer who has been the CEO of Craigslist since 2000.

== Early life ==
Buckmaster was born in Ann Arbor, Michigan. He graduated with a bachelor's degree from Virginia Tech and attended medical school at the University of Michigan. However, he dropped out in 1986, citing a lack of interest. He remained a student for the next ten years by taking at least one class for credit, therefore maintaining certain student privileges like gym access. During this time, he audited classics courses, did data entry, and eventually taught himself how to code.

In the early 1990s, he worked as a programmer for the Inter-university Consortium for Political and Social Research, where he designed the organization's web interface. Buckmaster later got a job in San Jose, California, and moved to San Francisco, where he commuted 5 hours roundtrip to work. During the dot-com bubble, he worked as a webmaster for a short-lived tech company, Creditland, in San Francisco.

== Craigslist ==
In late 1999, Buckmaster posted his resume onto Craigslist, where he was recruited by Craig Newmark, the founder of the website. As lead programmer, he contributed to the site's multi-city architecture, search engine, discussion forums, flagging system, self-posting process, homepage design, personals categories, and best-of-craigslist. In November 2000, he was promoted to the post of CEO.

Buckmaster wrote a series of haiku that appear in lieu of error messages on craigslist:

"The little poems — he has written appear on the screen at times when users might expect a helpful message from the staff. They function as a gnomic clue that what you are seeing is intentional, while discouraging further conversation or inquiry. For instance, start too many conversations in the forums and your new threads may fail to show up. Instead, you will see this:

'Frogs croak and gulls cry
silently a river floods
a red leaf floats by.'"

Referring to the purple peace sign he created that serves as craigslist's symbol and favicon:

"The only topic he can remember their disagreeing about is the peace sign that adorns the craigslist Web address. "Craig thought it was associated with the hippies and that hippies were discredited," Buckmaster says. "Whereas I think peace is among the most desirable things you can have."

On the topic of craigslist's company culture:

"The long-running tech-industry war between engineers and marketers has been ended at craigslist by the simple expedient of having no marketers. Only programmers, customer service reps, and accounting staff work at craigslist. There is no business development, no human resources, no sales. As a result, there are no meetings. The staff communicates by email and IM. This is a nice environment for employees of a certain temperament. "Not that we're a Shangri-La or anything," Buckmaster says, "but no technical people have ever left the company of their own accord."

Buckmaster also manages the Craigslist Charitable Fund and serves as executive producer for craigslist TV.

== Personal life ==
A fan of Noam Chomsky, Buckmaster has been accused of being "anti-capitalistic", which Buckmaster claims is an inaccurate characterization:

"We are not so much anti-capitalist (...) We're fortunate enough to have built a very healthy business, even though we haven't attempted to. All we have done is stop short of trying to become insanely wealthy. We have met billionaires and it sounds funny but it's not necessarily a bed of roses to have that kind of money. (...) Their life becomes about figuring out how to employ all that money either by philanthropy or other means. So we don't consider it that revolutionary to have stopped short of that."

"Companies looking to maximize revenue need to throw as many revenue-generating opportunities at users as they will tolerate," Buckmaster says. "We have absolutely no interest in doing that, which I think has been instrumental to the success of craigslist."

Buckmaster was once denounced on Fox News by Reverend Jerry Falwell.
