= Batman in film =

Film adaptations of the DC superhero

Adaptations of Batman in other media
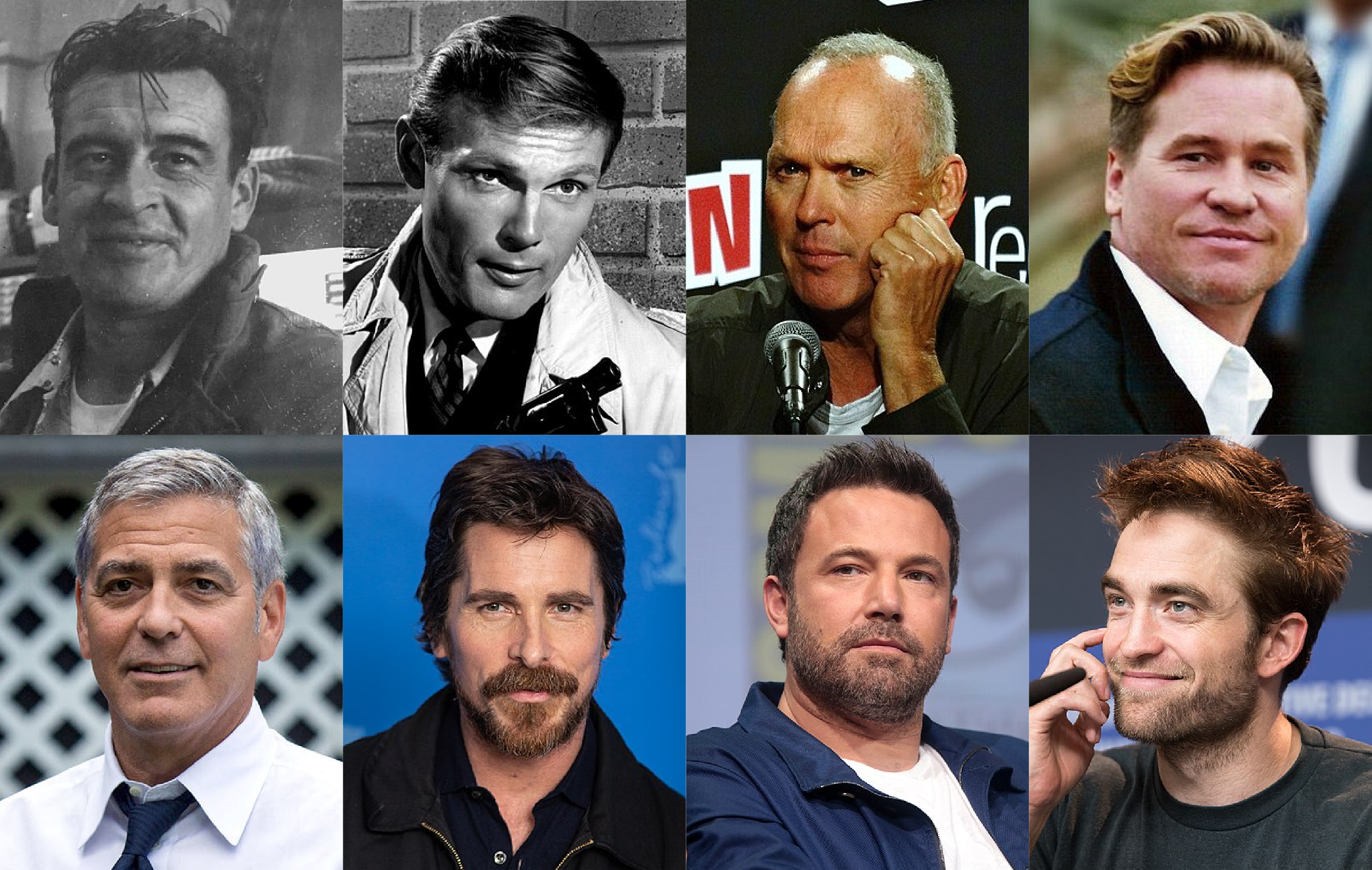
- Batman actors since 1943. Top to bottom, left to right: Lewis Wilson, Adam West, Michael Keaton, Val Kilmer, George Clooney, Christian Bale, Ben Affleck, Robert Pattinson.
- Original source: Comics published by DC Comics
- First appearance: Detective Comics #27 (1939)

Films and television
- Film(s): Serials: Batman (1943); Batman and Robin (1949); ABC spin-off: Batman (1966); Original film series: Batman (1989); Batman Returns (1992); Batman Forever (1995); Batman & Robin (1997); The Dark Knight trilogy: Batman Begins (2005); The Dark Knight (2008); The Dark Knight Rises (2012); DCEU: Batman v Superman: Dawn of Justice (2016); Suicide Squad (2016); Justice League (2017); Zack Snyder's Justice League (2021); The Flash (2023) (Note: Features different versions of the Bruce Wayne/Batman character: the DCEU version played by Ben Affleck, the 1989 series version played by Michael Keaton, the Batman & Robin version played by George Clooney, and the 1960s version in archival footage of Adam West); The Batman series: The Batman (2022); The Batman: Part II (2028); DCU: The Brave and the Bold (TBA); Miscellaneous: Batman: Mask of the Phantasm (1993); The Lego Batman Movie (2017); Joker (2019); Joker: Folie à Deux (2024)

Batman, a superhero created by Bob Kane and Bill Finger for comic books published by DC Comics, has appeared in nearly every form of media, including film since the 1940s. Columbia Pictures supervised the first film adaptations with Batman (1943) and Batman and Robin (1949), which deviated significantly from the source material. 20th Century Fox then released Batman (1966) as the theatrical spinoff to the American Broadcasting Company's (ABC) live-action TV program, also titled Batman (1966–1968), starring Adam West. After several years in limbo, Warner Bros. Pictures purchased the copyrights and developed a succession of Batman films in the late twentieth century, two directed by Tim Burton and another pair by Joel Schumacher. Michael Keaton portrays Batman in the Burton films, while Val Kilmer and George Clooney feature in said role in the Schumacher films.

Warner Bros. spent the turn of the millennium again in protracted development over a reboot, leading to the production of a trilogy of films starring Christian Bale: Batman Begins (2005), The Dark Knight (2008), and The Dark Knight Rises (2012). Another reboot followed with the creation of the DC Extended Universe (DCEU), in which Ben Affleck features as Batman beginning with Batman v Superman: Dawn of Justice (2016). The Batman (2022) and The Brave and the Bold will revamp the established continuity of the live-action films with incarnations of Batman played by Robert Pattinson and another actor. Joker (2019) features a depiction of the character as a civilian, predating his transformation into a vigilante. Numerous actors voice Batman in animated film.

The Batman films are generally successful and comprise the tenth highest grossing film franchise of all time, grossing over $6.76 billion globally. Critical opinion of films vary substantially. Rotten Tomatoes and Metacritic report a spectrum of aggregated scores between the best-received film, The Dark Knight, and the worst, Batman & Robin (1997). Occasionally, Batman films attract Academy Award recognition for acting and technical achievement.

== Initial adaptations ==
=== Early films ===
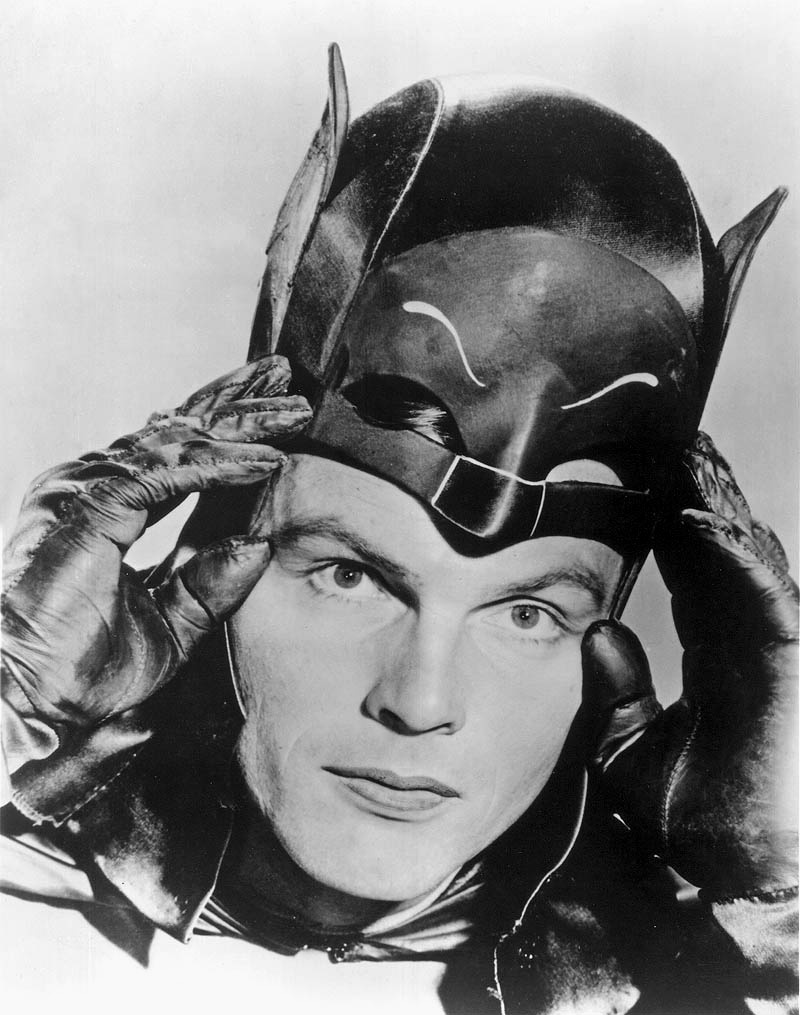
Publicity shot of Adam West in costume, 1966

Batman is the superhero persona of industrialist Bruce Wayne, a character created by Bob Kane and Bill Finger for comic books published by DC Comics (Note: At the time, DC was known as Detective Comics, one of at least two imprints of National Comics Publications.) in 1939. On the strength of the earliest comics, three major Hollywood studios approached DC to purchase the film rights in the early 1940s. Columbia Pictures bought the rights shortly afterward, and, in 1943, released a fifteen-chapter serial film directed by Lambert Hillyer and starring Lewis Wilson as Batman. The story follows Batman and Robin's attempts to sabotage a Japanese spy's plot to aid Axis conquest of the United States by producing a super weapon. Elements of Batman deviate from the source material in significant respects, most notably the addition of a Japanese villain, underscoring the film's propaganda function. Conceived eighteen months after Japan's attack on Pearl Harbor in December 1941, Batman reflected a wider cultural shift to arouse mass support for US intervention in World War II. Nevertheless, the serial introduced the Batcave and the Wayne Manor's secret grandfather clock entrance in Batman mythology. It was re-released in theaters in 1965 under the title An Evening with Batman and Robin.

In 1949, Columbia developed another fifteen-part serial, Batman and Robin, as the sequel to Batman, compelled by the success of Superman the previous year. Robert Lowery was Wilson's replacement as Batman, leading a new ensemble of actors opposite Johnny Duncan as Robin. Batman and Robin details the duo's retrieval of a stolen remote control machine from criminal mastermind Wizard, whose schemes threaten to disrupt Gotham City's transportation networks. Producer Sam Katzman sought to keep the cost of filming low, and the diminished budget led to further changes to the onscreen world. As a consequence, Batman and Robin fared poorly in reviews from the press.

The American Broadcasting Company's (ABC) creation of Batman, a live-action TV adaptation running in the mid-1960s, resurrected the character's popularity. 20th Century Fox released a theatrical film, also titled Batman, intended to be a precursor to the show in 1966. Featuring Adam West as the superhero, author Matthew J. Smith viewed the projects as campy, yet more faithful interpretations of the comics than the serials. West stated he was hesitant to consider the part because he feared being typecast, but was convinced by his agent. In the film, Batman and Robin (Burt Ward) confront the main antagonists of the series: the Joker (Cesar Romero), the Penguin (Burgess Meredith), the Riddler (Frank Gorshin), and Catwoman (Lee Meriwether).

=== Limbo ===
ABC's cancellation of Batman decreased Hollywood interest in further film adaptations. A concerted effort to produce another film did not begin until a year after the release of Superman (1978). Producers Michael Uslan and Benjamin Melniker purchased the rights with the aim of conceiving a more faithful adaptation of the comics. Superman was another catalyst for Uslan and Melniker's vision of a Batman film. Uslan pitched to multiple studios unsuccessfully, including Columbia and United Artists, prompting him to devise an outline, Return of the Batman, to better articulate his idea.

By November 1979, Uslan and Melniker obtained funding through a joint venture with Peter Guber, chairman of the film division of Casablanca Records. Under the arrangement, the producers were entitled to 40 percent of profits yielded by Casablanca. They commissioned a Batman film with a $15 million budget in 1981, but a series of corporate acquisitions prolonged negotiations over the film's distribution, stalling development. Casablanca's preexisting distribution agreement with Universal Pictures dissolved after the company was acquired by PolyGram Pictures. By this point, PolyGram faced bankruptcy after investing $80 million to increase their rate of output, and Guber brokered an agreement to transfer ownership of the Batman film rights to him and associate Jon Peters. Another associate pitched the project to Warner Bros. Pictures executive Frank Wells, and Peters then signed a deal with studio president Terry Semel which overlapped with the Casablanca contract. Since Uslan and Melniker were unaware of the dealings, they sued Warner Bros. in 1992 claiming a breach of contract on grounds of coercion and fraud.

Screenwriter Tom Mankiewicz completed the project's first draft in June 1983, titled The Batman. The draft focused on an origin story chronicling Wayne's transformation into Batman. Moreover, Mankiewicz developed the story to indicate a sequel following Batman and Dick Grayson as a crimefighting duo. Mankiewicz took inspiration from Batman: Strange Apparitions, a multi-issue limited series by Steve Englehart and Marshall Rogers. Though The Batman was announced with a mid-1985 release date, revisions to the script impeded progress on the film. In total, the script underwent ten rewrites from ten screenwriters at the behest of several different directors.

== Original film series ==
=== Batman (1989) ===
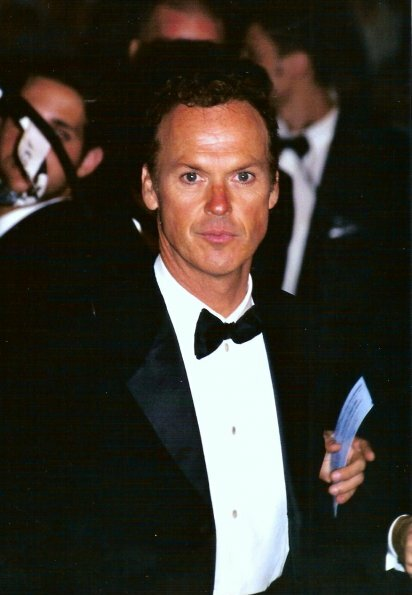
Michael Keaton in 2002

Warner Bros. appointed Tim Burton as Batman director in 1988. The studio approached Burton as early as 1985, but had no formalized deal until a week after Beetlejuice opened in theaters. Burton discarded Mankiewicz's screenplay as he found the tone too similar to Superman. Englehart and Julie Hickson prepared film treatments which Sam Hamm reworked into the script. Frank Miller's The Dark Knight Returns (1986) guided Hamm's script, reflecting a darker approach than previous interpretations to that point. When the 1988 Writers Guild of America strike forced Hamm to resign, Warner Bros. engaged Warren Skaaren, Charles McKeown and Jonathan Gems for additional rewrites to lighten the tone.

Burton chose Michael Keaton among a number of leading men as Wayne, despite resistance from studio executives. Keaton was a controversial casting choice; he had been mainly known as a comedic actor and was not perceived to fit the Batman archetype. Jack Nicholson stars opposite Keaton as the Joker, earning as much as $50–$90 million for his work. Principal photography occurred from October 1988 to January 1989 on constructed sets at the backlot of Pinewood Studios in London. After its June 1989 release, Batman received mostly positive reviews and finished the theatrical run as the year's second highest-grossing film, with a box office take of $400 million. At the 62nd Academy Awards, the film won Best Art Direction.

=== Batman Returns (1992) ===
Studio executives prioritized a sequel to Batman beginning in late-1989. Warner Bros. secured Burton's commitment as director for Batman Returns in 1991. Burton was reluctant to return for another film because he was cynical about sequels. He had also been frustrated with the authority Guber and Peters exerted over the original film, agreeing to Batman Returns only on the condition of greater independence. Daniel Waters replaced Hamm as screenwriter based on Burton's preference for a writer that had no involvement with Batman. Waters developed the script with greater emphasis on the villains—including Catwoman (Michelle Pfeiffer) and the Penguin (Danny DeVito). Burton brought on Wesley Strick for an uncredited rewrite before assigning Waters further script editing duties. Keaton reprised his role for a $10 million salary. Filmmakers shot Batman Returns from September 1991 to February 1992, and the film was released in theaters that June. Batman Returns polarized critics and saw diminished returns at the box office.

=== Batman Forever (1995) ===
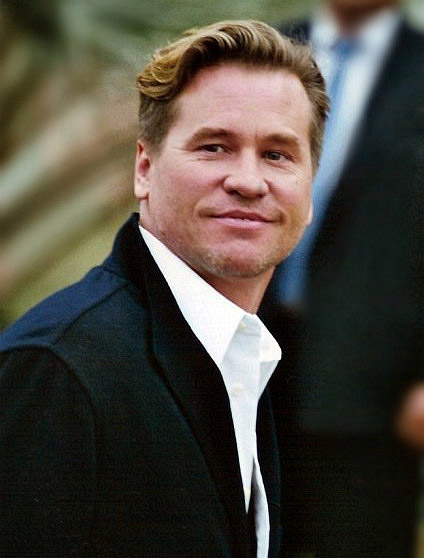
Val Kilmer in 2005

To improve their profit-making potential, Warner Bros. developed Batman Forever with a more family-friendly tone. The studio did not want to continue the series with Burton and encouraged the filmmaker to seek other projects, though Burton remained involved as an executive producer. They hired Joel Schumacher as Burton's replacement, believing he could better realize a film conducive to advertising toys. The screenplay was conceived by Lee and Janet Scott-Batchler, a husband-and-wife writing team, and Akiva Goldsman. Keaton at first supported the changes but in time dropped out, objecting to the script.

Ethan Hawke, Daniel Day-Lewis, Ralph Fiennes, and Kurt Russell were among those considered to play Batman, which eventually went to Val Kilmer. Kilmer came to Schumacher's attention for his work in the Western film Tombstone (1993). Shooting took place from September 1994 to March 1995, followed by the theatrical rollout in June 1995. Batman Forever finished the year as the sixth highest-grossing film by amassing $350 million globally, but drew a tepid critical response. Nonetheless, the film received three nominations at the 68th Academy Awards.

=== Batman & Robin (1997) ===
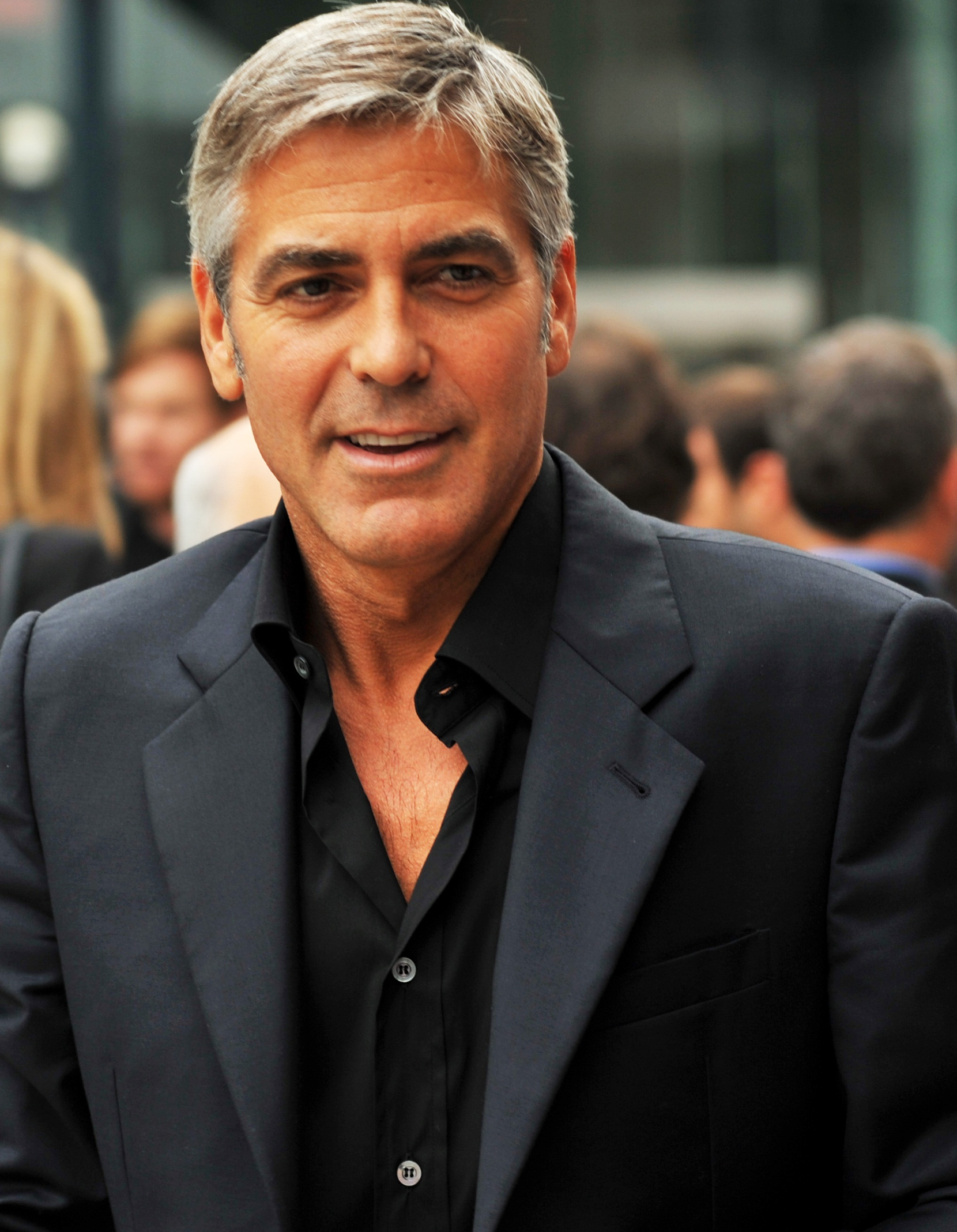
George Clooney in 2009

Schumacher was signed as director of Batman & Robin while Batman Forever ran in theaters. Goldman and Chris O'Donnell returned, the former as the film's sole screenwriter. Kilmer did not reappear, and reports give conflicting accounts about the circumstance of the actor's departure. Schumacher maintained in a 1996 interview that producers "sort of fired" Kilmer because he was volatile on the set of Batman Forever. On the other hand, Kilmer cited scheduling conflicts that arose as a result of prior commitments to Heat (1995) and The Saint (1997). In his documentary film Val (2021), the actor clarified further that the experience working in the Batsuit, which he found cumbersome, influenced his decision to leave.

Executive Bob Daly mentioned George Clooney in casting discussions, leading to Clooney's hiring based on his performance in From Dusk till Dawn (1996) and his likeness to Batman's comic book counterpart. Filming for Batman & Robin began in September 1996 and finished two weeks ahead of schedule in January 1997, and the theatrical release was scheduled in June 1997. Batman & Robin was a critical and commercial failure and is cited as one of the worst blockbuster films ever made.

=== Unrealized proposals ===
Warner Bros. initiated plans to expand the franchise with several films, including a third Schumacher Batman film commissioned as Batman & Robin was in production. The studio announced the project with Mark Protosevich as screenwriter. Schumacher said he planned to revisit a darker storytelling approach, contradicting a Los Angeles Times piece that claimed he would continue the direction of his other Batman films. Protosevich's treatment, a 150-page script named Batman Unchained, revolves around Wayne's efforts to confront figures of his turmoiled past, chiefly the Scarecrow, Harley Quinn, and, ultimately, the Joker through a drug-induced hallucination. In the film's final scene, Wayne is besieged by a swarm of bats as a symbol of triumph over his fears. Warner Bros. cast Coolio to play Scarecrow, introducing the character in a cameo in Batman & Robin. Sequel development collapsed after the failure of Batman & Robin.

Around the same time, another project titled Batman: DarKnight was approved by Warner Bros., from a script conceived by novice writers Lee Shapiro and Stephen Wise. Shapiro and Wise pitched to the studio on learning that they were contemplating a new direction for Batman. Their story was inspired by The Dark Knight Returns, featuring Wayne, disillusioned by crimefighting, retreating from the public, and encouraging Grayson to pursue college. Grayson has an adversarial relationship with professor Jonathan Crane, civilian persona of Scarecrow, who kidnaps and tortures Grayson in psychological experiments in Arkham Asylum. Man-Bat features in DarKnight as a secondary villain whose crimes are erroneously blamed on Batman, luring Wayne out of hiding. By 2001, Warner Bros. brought on Jeff Robinov to commence plans for a reboot, ending all active development of their original Batman series.

== Planned relaunch ==
At the turn of the millennium, Warner Bros. entered a protracted development period over a Batman film. Three reboot proposals emerged during this time, the earliest being an adaptation of Miller's comic book story arc Batman: Year One (1987). Schumacher made the suggestion to Warner Bros. in 1998, and within a year, the studio solicited the then-relatively unknown filmmaker Darren Aronofsky for ideas to approach a remake. According to Aronofsky, the studio was receptive after he quipped, "I'd cast Clint Eastwood as the Dark Knight, and shoot it in Tokyo, doubling for Gotham City." He joined as director in 2000. Aronofsky worked with Miller to write the Batman: Year One script in their second collaboration; their first work together was an undeveloped screenplay of Miller's multi-issue series Ronin. Their script re-conceptualized Batman with working class origins and placed greater emphasis on the character's psychological profile. Christian Bale and Freddie Prinze, Jr. were discussed to star, and Aronofsky campaigned to hire Joaquin Phoenix against studio intent, but Batman: Year One never went into production. Owing to creative disagreements with Aronofsky and Miller, Warner Bros. abandoned efforts on the project.

Alan Horn succeeded Terry Semel and Bob Daly as COO and president of Warner Bros. in 1999. There he implemented plans to relaunch the Batman and Superman franchises as part of a broader measure to increase the studio's output of blockbuster films. The efforts may have been shaped in part by a corporate merger between parent company Time Warner and AOL in 2001. Although the idea of a crossover film portraying Batman and Superman as foes long circulated in the press, it was screenwriter Andrew Kevin Walker who first brought forward the concept in earnest in August 2001. Warner Bros. engaged Wolfgang Petersen to direct Batman Vs. Superman, who then secured Walker's services to prepare a draft. Goldman was brought on for a rewrite when the studio rejected Walker's draft, but the successive script drew mixed reactions. Thereafter Petersen left to make another Warner project, the historical drama Troy (2004), and Horn clashed with producer Lorenzo di Bonaventura because they had competing visions for the franchises. Ultimately, the studio proceeded with plans for solo films and development of Batman Vs. Superman unraveled.

In 2000, Warner Bros. oversaw a live-action adaptation of their animated TV program Batman Beyond. They commissioned Boaz Yakin and Batman Beyond creators Paul Dini and Alan Burnett to write a draft, but found the direction unsatisfactory and severed further commitment. Little else is known about the project and filmmakers involved seldom discuss information in interviews with the media.

A younger Wayne played by Armie Hammer was a subject of a Justice League film known as Justice League: Mortal, which was meant to launch a franchise independent of the mainline Batman films in the late 2000s. Several problems beset the production. Warner Bros. suspended filming in the wake of an industrywide labor strike by the Writers Guild of America and again over disputes concerning the studio's request for tax subsidies from the government of Australia, which was denied by the Australian Film Commission. In turn, Warner Bros. relocated the film's administrative operations to Canada, before cancelling production to mandate solo films of the DC characters, enacted after the release of The Dark Knight (2008).

== The Dark Knight trilogy ==
=== Batman Begins (2005) ===
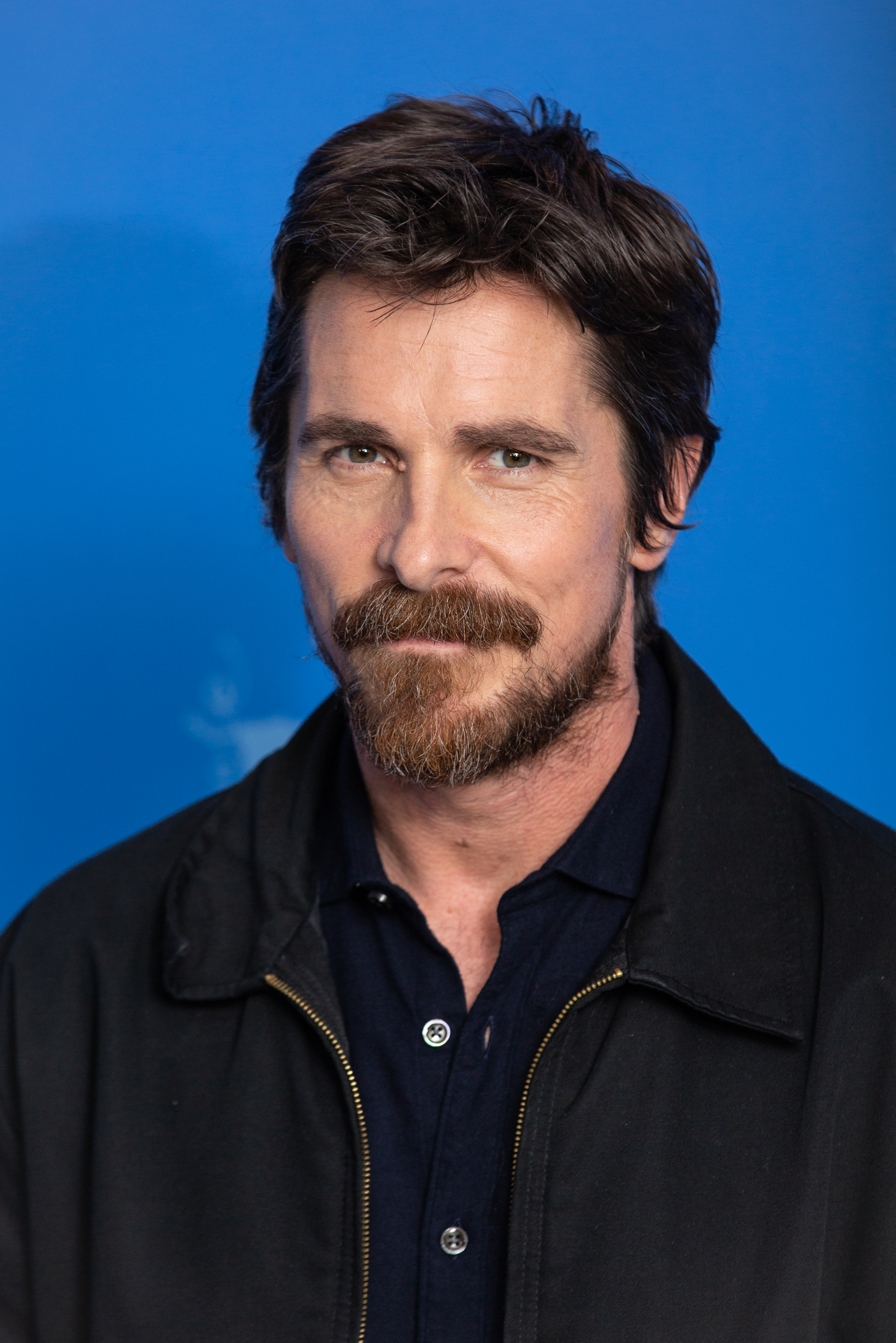
Christian Bale in 2019

Christopher Nolan was signed to a pay-or-play contract as director of Batman Begins in early 2003, after approaching Warner Bros. with the idea of making a Batman film centered on the character's origins. At the time, the studio wanted to reconcile relations with the filmmaker after Petersen took his place as Troy director. Nolan said he aimed to develop a more realistic, grittier film setting to differentiate Batman Begins from Warner's original Batman movies. This encompassed the creation of an updated Batmobile and an all-black Batsuit designed for more agile movement.

Nolan and David S. Goyer produced the film's completed script. Management cast Bale, under Nolan's belief that he exuded "exactly the balance of darkness and light" they desired for the character. To prepare for the role, Bale was given martial arts training, regained the weight he lost for The Machinist (2004), and increased his muscle mass, weighing about 220 pounds (100 kg). The filmmaking crew spent 2004 shooting Batman Begins in Iceland, the United Kingdom and Chicago, the lattermost within a three-week period. They relied on miniature effects and traditional stunts during the production, using computer-generated imagery (CGI) only sparingly. Despite a poor box office prognosis, the film was released in June 2005 to improved results, grossing $375.4 million worldwide. Reviews from critics were very positive, and Batman Begins became a candidate for Best Cinematography at the 78th Academy Awards.

=== The Dark Knight (2008) ===
Nolan did not plan to make a sequel, but nevertheless brainstormed ideas with Goyer during the filming of Batman Begins. The men worked together to outline The Dark Knight's essential plot points for three months. Nolan next assisted his brother Jonathan with development of the script, starting with a draft screenplay finished in six months. The brothers spent another six months collaborating on the final script. Filmmakers again redesigned the Batsuit to make it more comfortable to wear. Bale reprised his role as Batman, performing many of his own stunts. The film story sees Batman battling his arch-nemesis the Joker (Heath Ledger), who obstructs efforts to control organized crime by his newly-forged alliance with district attorney Harvey Dent (Aaron Eckhart) and police lieutenant James Gordon (Gary Oldman).

The Dark Knight was shot on a 127-day schedule from April to November 2007, and opened to widespread critical acclaim in July 2008. It broke numerous box office records, becoming the highest-grossing film of 2008 and exceeding $1 billion by February 2009. Near the end of its global rollout, the film entered the 81st Academy Awards season as a frontrunner with eight nominations, winning two. Ledger's posthumous win for Best Supporting Actor made The Dark Knight the first comic book film to win an Academy Award for acting. In 2020, the United States Library of Congress selected the film for preservation in the National Film Registry.

=== The Dark Knight Rises (2012) ===
After initial hesitation, Nolan returned to direct The Dark Knight Rises, and, with his brother and Goyer, conceived a story he believed would conclude the trilogy on a satisfying note. He contemplated story and character ideas with Goyer before tasking Jonathan with the scriptwriting. Warner Bros. proposed a character similar to Ledger's Joker as the film's primary villain, but Nolan picked Bane (Tom Hardy), favoring a physically imposing figure as antagonist. The director cited Metropolis (1927), Doctor Zhivago (1965), The Battle of Algiers (1966), Prince of the City (1981), and Blade Runner (1982) as major influences on The Dark Knight Rises's artistic direction. One of Nolan's main goals was to shoot the film with IMAX cameras as he wanted visual uniformity between The Dark Knight projects. Production lasted from May to November 2011, and The Dark Knight Rises debuted in North American theaters in July 2012. The film eventually surpassed The Dark Knight's box office gross and drew highly positive reviews from critics.

== DC Extended Universe ==
=== Title roles ===
==== Batman v Superman: Dawn of Justice (2016) ====
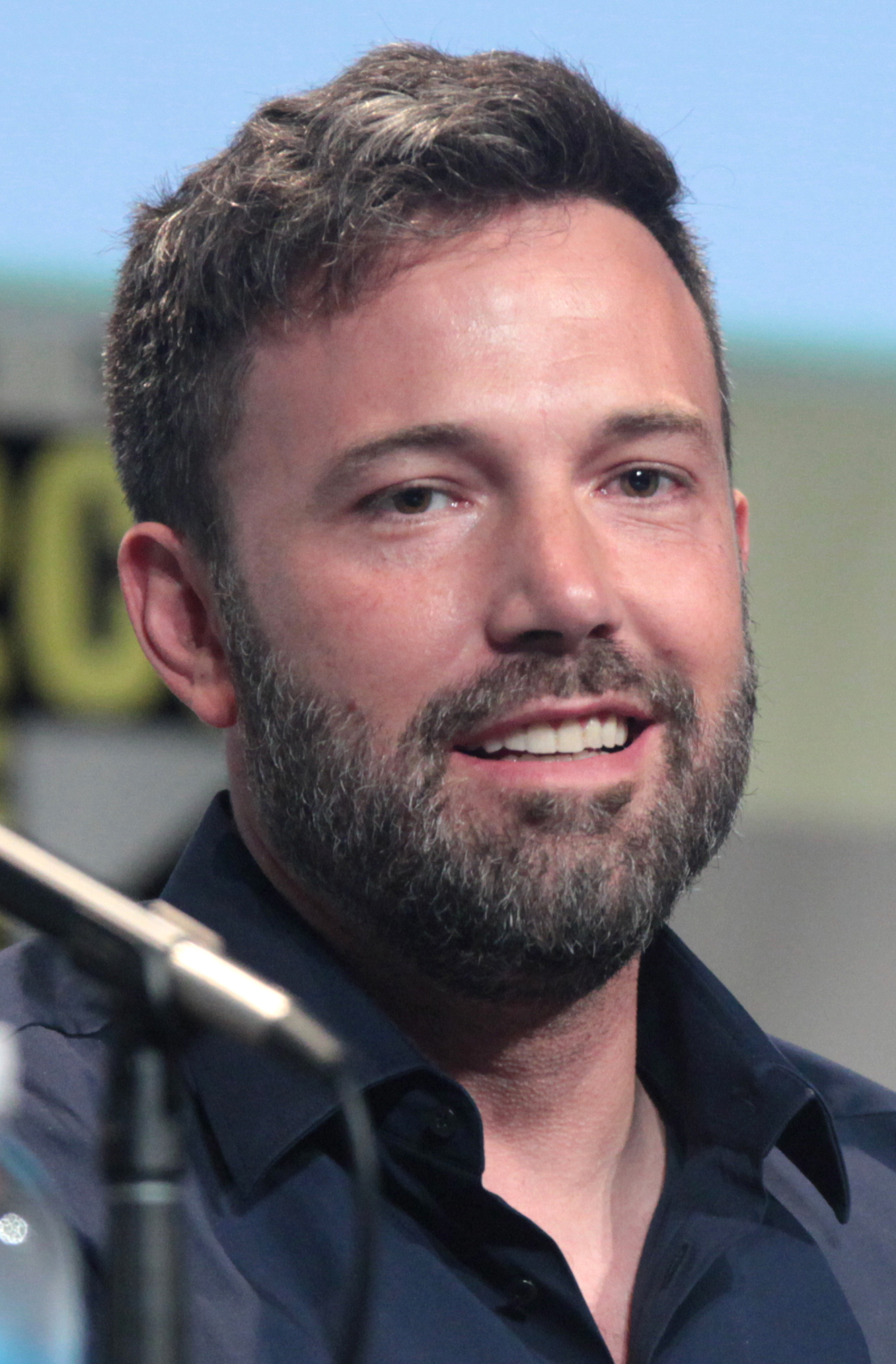
Ben Affleck in 2015

Press speculation about a sequel to Man of Steel (2013) preceded the 46th San Diego Comic-Con. At that event, director Zack Snyder announced Batman v Superman: Dawn of Justice as Man of Steel's follow-up, based on a narrative inspired by The Dark Knight Returns. Goyer returned to develop a screenplay that was rewritten at least three times, including once by Chris Terrio, because he was working concurrently on other projects of the DC Extended Universe (DCEU). Terrio's script was influenced by The Dark Knight films, philosopher Umberto Eco's "The Myth of Superman" essay, and "Musée des Beaux Arts", an allegorical poem by English poet W. H. Auden.

Nolan worked as an executive producer, albeit in an advisory role, but Warner Bros. did not approach Bale to reprise Batman. Ben Affleck stars in said role in Dawn of Justice, news of which was confirmed in August 2013. The casting choice was contingent on studio demands for an older Batman to contrast with a younger Superman (Henry Cavill). Filming occurred in 2014, and following multiples changes in the exhibition schedule, Warner Bros. released the film in March 2016. Dawn of Justice was derided in professional reviews, while the film fared better with audiences. At the box office, it emerged as the seventh highest-grossing film of 2016 with $874 million.

=== Ensemble roles ===
==== Justice League (2017) ====
Warner Bros. filed a lawsuit against the estate of Joe Shuster over the execution of a termination clause barring the disposition of the estate's share of the copyrights to Superman. The US Court of Appeals for the Ninth Circuit ruled in favor of Warner Bros. in October 2012, and the studio immediately moved forward with plans to create a Justice League film. They hired Will Beall to conceive the initial draft, which was replaced when Goyer took over as the scriptwriter the following year. Goyer's work was discarded for a rewritten script completed by Terrio in July 2015.

Afterwards, Justice League fell into a drawn-out development phase involving a succession of rewrites and a dispute concerning the budget, delaying the film's production. Affleck returned as Batman, and Snyder continued his duties as director until his departure due to his daughter's death in 2017. His replacement, Joss Whedon, made substantial changes to the script and supervised reshoots, though only Snyder is billed as Justice League director. The film was shot from April to October 2016, and was released in November 2017 to largely negative reviews. It was also a box office disappointment by failing to recoup enough money to break-even. After Justice League's release, Whedon was criticized for his treatment of the actors, and Terrio disavowed the film, citing studio interference.

==== Zack Snyder's Justice League (2021) ====
Given the negative reaction to Justice League, a fan campaign went viral on social media under the hashtag "#ReleaseTheSnyderCut", calling for the release of Snyder's version of the film. Snyder had an unedited cut of this film version saved on his laptop around the time of his departure, which was presented to Warner Bros. executives in February 2020 in an event he organized with his wife Deborah. That May, it was announced as an official project, a director's cut titled Zack Snyder's Justice League; the film premiered on HBO Max in March 2021. Warner Bros. allocated a $70 million budget to complete work related mostly to visual effects. The film does not share continuity with the DCEU. Zack Snyder's Justice League features a newly filmed scene with Affleck's Batman.

==== Other DCEU films ====
In Suicide Squad (2016), Affleck features in flashback scenes depicting the arrests of Floyd Lawton / Deadshot (Will Smith) and Harley Quinn (Margot Robbie). Keaton and Clooney's Batmen appear in supporting roles in The Flash (2023). Both actors play alternate versions of DCEU's main continuity Batman (Affleck). West makes a posthumous cameo appearance in a multiverse sequence developed with a combination of archival footage, deepfake effects, and artificial intelligence. Keaton was set to return to the DCEU in an expanded capacity in Batgirl until the film's cancellation in August 2022.

== The Batman Epic Crime Saga ==
=== The Batman (2022) ===
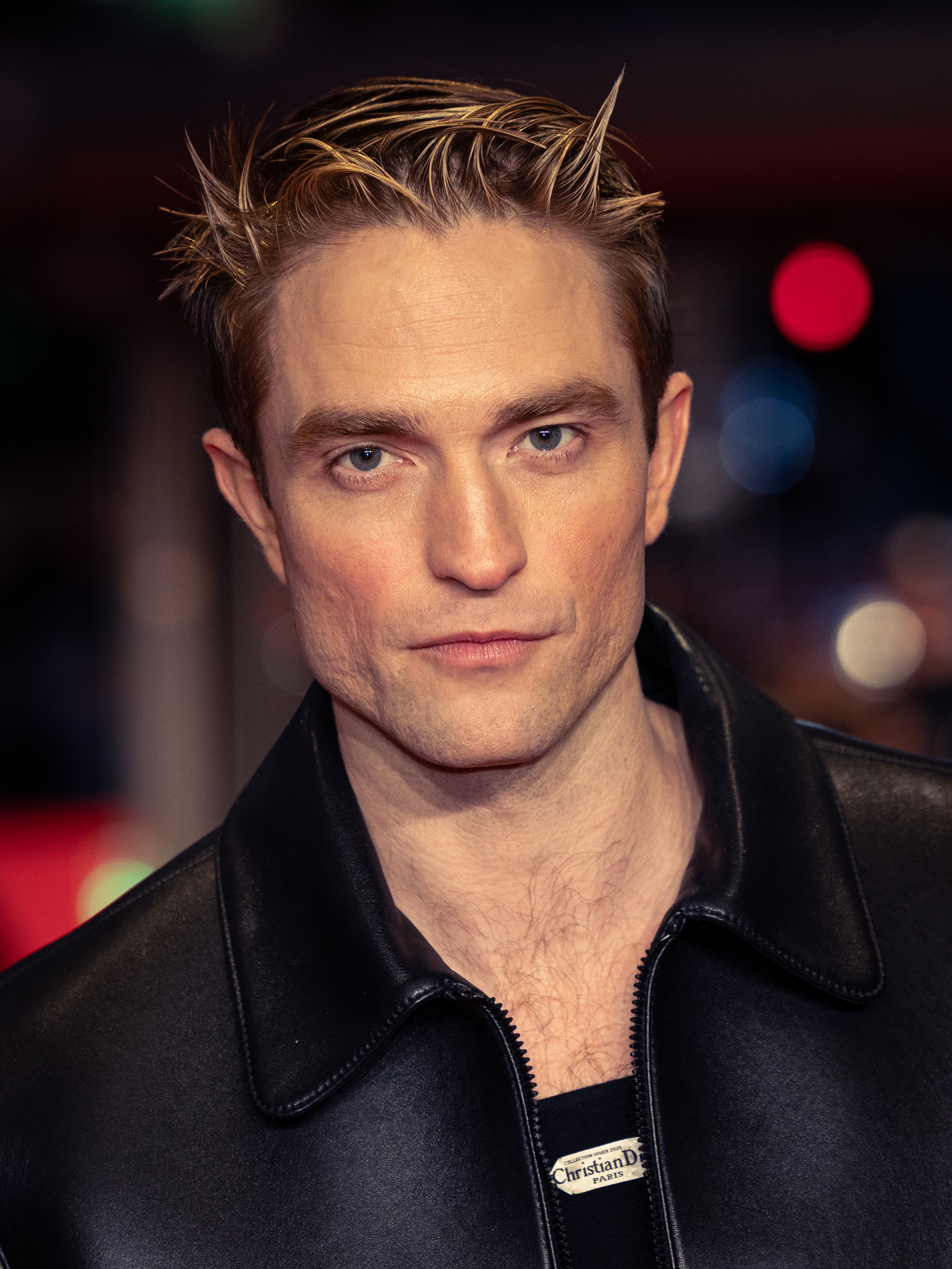
Robert Pattinson in 2025

Work on a standalone Batman film was well underway once Warner Bros. cast Affleck in 2014. He was signed as director, writer, and the film's starring actor, but stepped down amidst various personal and professional struggles. Matt Reeves replaced Affleck as director and writer, creating the story anew with Mattson Tomlin and Peter Craig. Reeves focused on a younger Batman, borrowing from the tradition of a detective story, and expunged connections to the DCEU in the script. To conceptualize the film world, and to further develop the plot, the director sought inspiration from an array of Batman comics and New Hollywood era films. (Note: Attributed to multiple sources:) The Batman universe is separate from the DC Universe (DCU), and hence will exist simultaneously with a DCU Batman within the continuity of a multiverse.

The search for an actor to play Batman was described as "intense", but unusually quick for a superhero film. Speculation in the media favored Robert Pattinson, and Warner Bros. signed the actor in May 2019, prompting backlash from some fans. Reeves said he wrote the character with Pattinson in mind, having been impressed with his performances in Good Time (2017) and High Life (2018). Pattinson received a $3 million salary for his work. Filmmakers spent over a year shooting The Batman thanks to the COVID-19 pandemic, which halted production for five-and-a-half months. Postponed twice, Warner Bros. released the film in March 2022.

=== The Batman: Part II (2028) ===
A sequel, The Batman: Part II, was announced in April 2022; Reeves, Tomlin, and Pattinson will reprise their respective roles. The production was delayed to accommodate changes in the writing, and a completed script was submitted in June 2025. Part II is slated to be released on February 18, 2028.

== DC Universe ==
=== The Brave and the Bold ===
In October 2022, Warner Bros. Discovery formed DC Studios, with filmmakers James Gunn and Peter Safran as its co-chairmen and CEOs, to facilitate development of film and TV adaptations within the context of a new shared universe, the DCU. A Batman film gleaning comic books by Grant Morrison, titled The Brave and the Bold, was confirmed as one of the DCU projects in active development in January 2023. The story will concentrate on Wayne and his relationship with his teenage son Damian. Warner Bros. enlisted Andy Muschietti as the film's director, with his sister Barbara set to produce through their production company Double Dream, alongside Gunn and Safran. Work on The Brave and the Bold, according to Gunn, remains underway as of 2026, despite reports claiming the film was delayed by Paramount Skydance's acquisition of Warner Bros.

== Joker films ==
Beginning in 2019, Warner Bros. distributed two standalone films based on the Joker, directed by Todd Phillips. Both films predate Wayne's transformation into Batman. Joker depicts an origin story about a failed comedian's (Phoenix) descent into madness, culminating in the murders of Wayne's parents by a masked rioter. The film portrays Wayne as a young child (played by Dante Pereira-Olson).

== Animated films ==
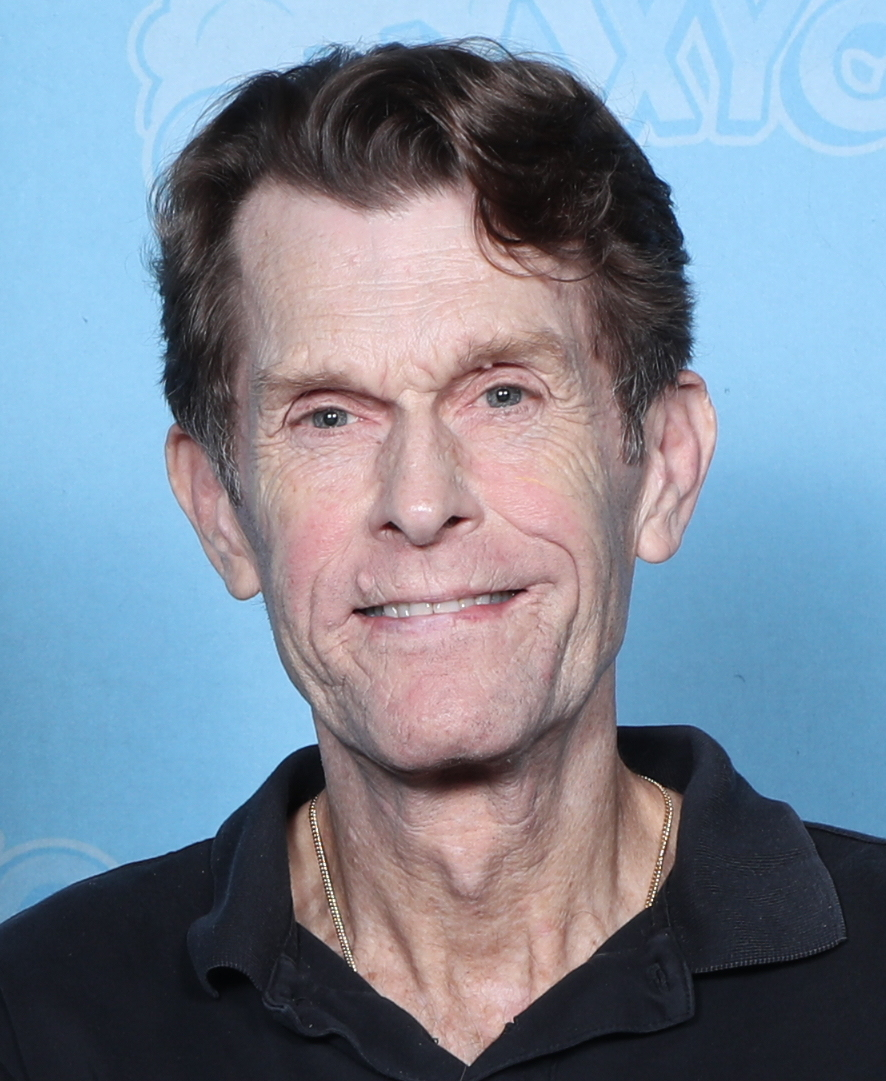
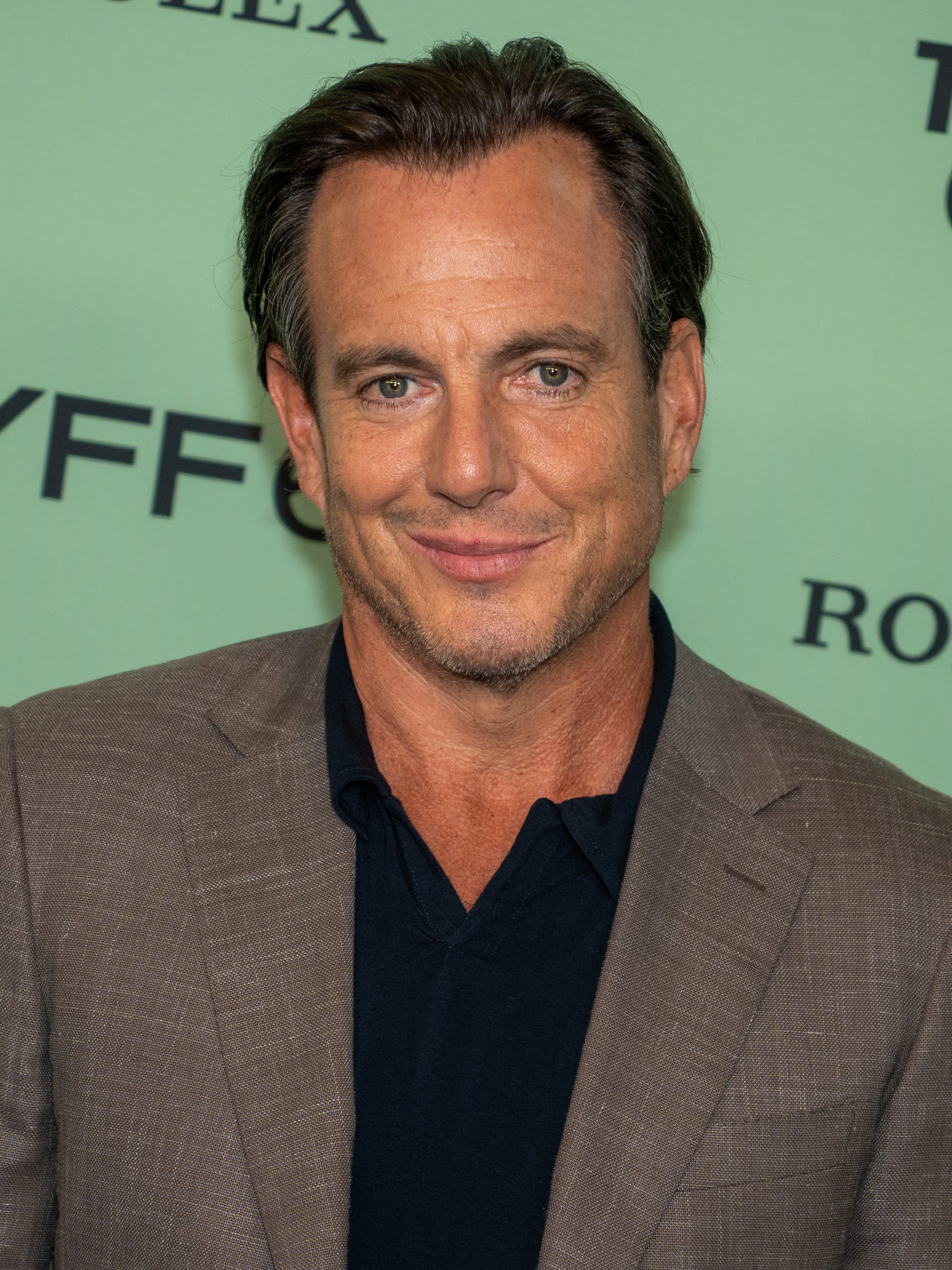
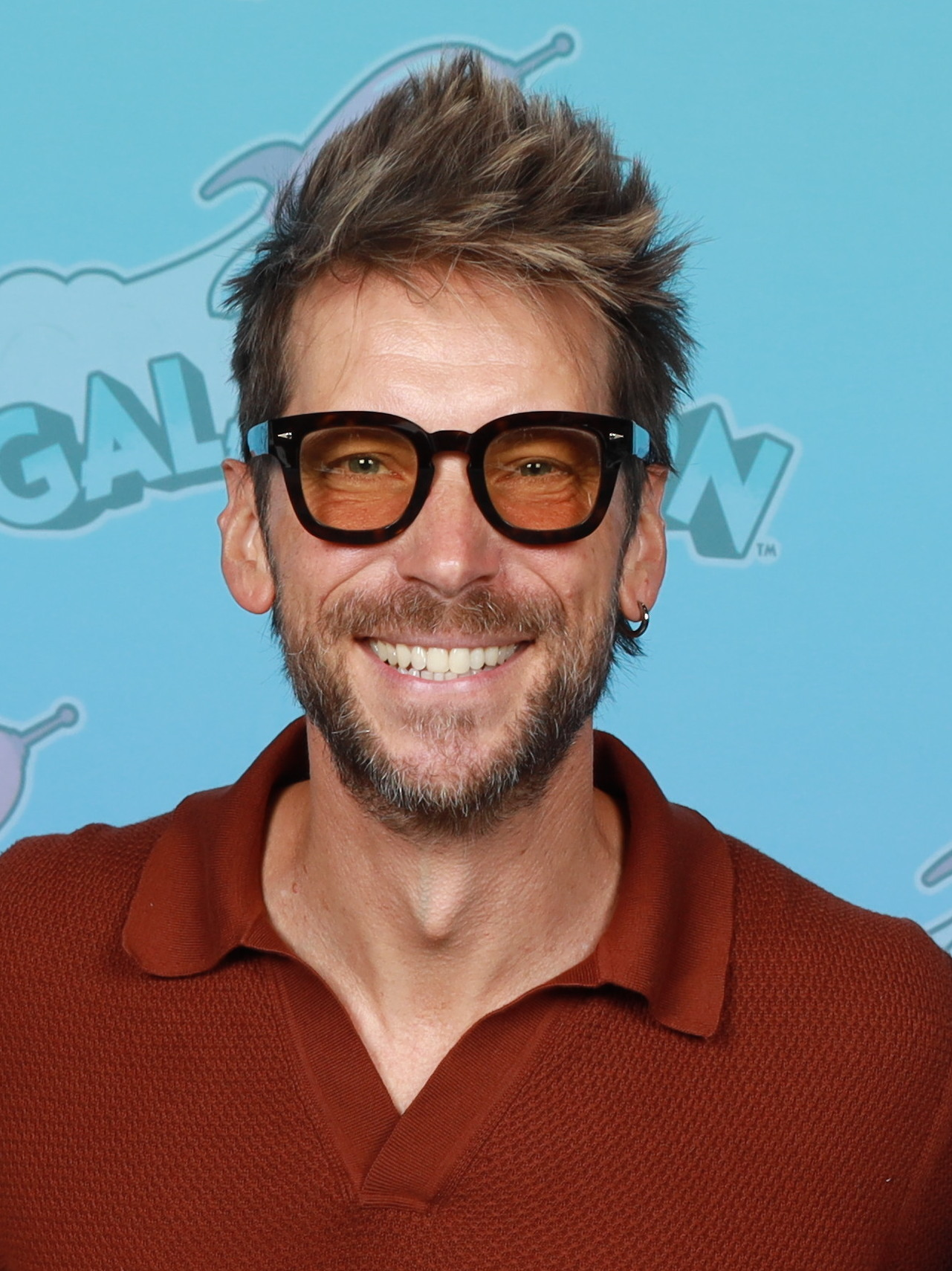
Numerous actors voice Batman in animated film, including Kevin Conroy (pictured in 2021), Will Arnett, and Troy Baker (both 2025)

Batman has appeared in a variety of animated films since the early 1990s. His first appearance was in Batman: Mask of the Phantasm (1993), voiced by Kevin Conroy. It originated as a direct-to-video release, following the breakout success of Fox's TV adaptation of the character, Batman: The Animated Series, itself influenced by the live-action Burton films. Mask of Phantasm received notice for its subject matter, animation style, and music. Conroy continued voicing the character in various productions up to his death in 2022.

Batman is the titular lead in 39 films and features in another 35 in a supporting capacity, generally as part of the Justice League. Warner Bros. occasionally produces theatrical features, as is the case with Batman: The Killing Joke (2016) and films of The Lego Movie franchise, in which Will Arnett portrays the character. Numerous actors have voiced Batman, including Jensen Ackles, Michael C. Hall, Roger Craig Smith, and Troy Baker. Further development of animated Batman films is ongoing as of 2026.

== Recurring cast and characters ==
List indicators

This section includes characters who will appear or have appeared in multiple Batman or Batman-centered films that received a wide theatrical release.

- An empty grey cell indicates the character was not in the film, or that the character's official presence has not yet been confirmed.
- ^{A} indicates an appearance through archival footage or audio.
- ^{C} indicates a cameo role.
- ^{P} indicates an appearance in onscreen photographs.
- ^{S} indicates an appearance through use of special effects.
- ^{U} indicates an uncredited appearance.
- ^{V} indicates a voice-only role.
- ^{Y} indicates a younger version of the character.
- ^{L} indicates the actor or actress lent only their likeness for the film.

Character	Serial films	Batman	Tim Burton / Joel Schumacher films	Batman: Mask of the Phantasm	The Dark Knight trilogy	Batman: The Killing Joke	DC Extended Universe films	The Lego Batman Movie	Joker films	The Batman films
Character	1943, 1949	1966	1989–1997	1993	2005–2012	2016	2016–2023	2017	2019, 2024	2022, 2028
Batman	Lewis Wilson Robert Lowery	Adam West	Michael Keaton; Charles Roskilly^{Y} Val Kilmer; Ramsey Ellis^{Y} George Clooney; Eric Lloyd^{Y}	Kevin Conroy^{V}	Christian Bale; Gus Lewis^{Y}	Kevin Conroy^{V}	Ben Affleck; Brandon Spink^{Y} Michael Keaton (Note: Version from Tim Burton / Joel Schumacher films continuity.) George Clooney Adam West^{L} (Note: Version from 1966 film continuity.)	Will Arnett^{V} Adam West^{A}	Dante Pereira-Olson (Note: This version of the character does not appear as Batman.)	Robert Pattinson; Oscar Novak^{Y}
Alfred Pennyworth	William Austin^{U} Eric Wilton^{U}	Alan Napier	Michael Gough; Jon Simmons^{Y}	Efrem Zimbalist, Jr.^{V}	Michael Caine	Brian George^{V}	Jeremy Irons	Ralph Fiennes^{V}	Douglas Hodge	Andy Serkis
James "Jim" Gordon	Lyle Talbot	Neil Hamilton	Pat Hingle	Bob Hastings^{V}	Gary Oldman	Ray Wise^{V}	J. K. Simmons	Héctor Elizondo^{V}		Jeffrey Wright
Robin	Douglas Croft Johnny Duncan	Burt Ward	Chris O'Donnell		Joseph Gordon-Levitt (Note: In The Dark Knight Rises, Gordon-Levitt portrays "Robin John Blake", a detective working for the GCPD whom Bruce Wayne deems an ally and entrusts the Batcave to.)		Burt Ward^{L}	Michael Cera^{V}		
Vicki Vale	Jane Adams		Kim Basinger					Appeared		
Joker		Cesar Romero	Jack Nicholson (Note: In the Tim Burton / Joel Schumacher continuity, the character's real name is Jack Napier.); Hugo E. Blick^{Y} David U. Hodges^{U}^{Y}	Mark Hamill^{V}	Heath Ledger	Mark Hamill^{V}	Jared Leto Jack Nicholson^{L} Cesar Romero^{L}	Zach Galifianakis^{V}	Joaquin Phoenix (Note: In the Joker film continuity, the character's real name is Arthur Fleck.) Connor Storrie (Note: Joker: Folie à Deux implies that Storrie's character is the real Joker.)	Barry Keoghan (Note: Credited as "Unseen Arkham Prisoner".)
Catwoman		Lee Meriwether	Michelle Pfeiffer		Anne Hathaway		Eartha Kitt^{L}	Zoë Kravitz^{V}		Zoë Kravitz
Penguin		Burgess Meredith	Danny DeVito					John Venzon^{V}		Colin Farrell
Riddler		Frank Gorshin	Jim Carrey					Conan O'Brien^{V}		Paul Dano; Joseph Walker^{Y}
Two-Face			Billy Dee Williams (Note: Two-Face identity not used.) Tommy Lee Jones		Aaron Eckhart			Billy Dee Williams^{V}	Harry Lawtey	Sebastian Stan
Thomas Wayne			David Baxt Michael Scranton^{C}		Linus Roache		Jeffrey Dean Morgan	^{P}	Brett Cullen	Luke Roberts
Martha Wayne			Sharon Holm Eileen Seeley^{C}		Sara Stewart		Lauren Cohan	^{P}	Carrie Louise Putrello	Stella Stocker
Joe Chill			Clyde Gatell (Note: Credited as "Other Mugger".)		Richard Brake		Damon Caro^{U}		^{U}	
Sal Maroni			Dennis Paladino^{C}		Eric Roberts	Rick D. Wasserman^{V}				
Mr. Freeze			Arnold Schwarzenegger					David Burrows^{V}		
Poison Ivy			Uma Thurman					Riki Lindhome^{V}		
Batgirl			Alicia Silverstone (Note: This version of the character appears using the name Barbara Wilson.)		Hannah Gunn (Note: Credited as "Gordon's daughter")	Tara Strong^{V}		Rosario Dawson^{V}		
Bane			Robert Swenson; Michael Reid MacKay (Note: MacKay portrays Antonio Diego, an Arkham Asylum inmate who is transformed into Bane.)		Tom Hardy			Doug Benson^{V}		
Harvey Bullock				Robert Costanzo^{V}		Robin Atkin Downes^{V}				
Scarecrow					Cillian Murphy			Jason Mantzoukas^{V}		
Carmine Falcone					Tom Wilkinson					John Turturro
Victor Zsasz					Tim Booth					TBA
Superman							Henry Cavill	Channing Tatum^{V}		
The Flash							Ezra Miller	Adam Devine^{V}		
Harley Quinn							Margot Robbie	Jenny Slate^{V}	Lady Gaga (Note: Harley Quinn alias not used.)	
Killer Croc							Adewale Akinnuoye-Agbaje	Matt Villa^{V}		

== Reception ==
=== Box office performance ===
Film	Release date	Box office revenue			All-time ranking		Budget	Ref.
Film	Release date	North America	Other territories	Worldwide	U.S. and Canada	Worldwide	Budget	Ref.
Batman (1966)	July 30, 1966	$1,700,000	—N/a	$1,700,000	—N/a	—N/a	$1.5 million	
Batman (1989)	June 23, 1989	$251,409,241	$160,160,000	$411,569,241	#131	#308	$35 million	
Batman Returns	June 19, 1992	$162,924,631	$103,990,656	$266,915,287	#334	#592	$80 million	
Batman: Mask of the Phantasm	December 25, 1993	$5,635,204	—N/a	$5,635,204	#6,208	#9,093	—N/a	
Batman Forever	June 16, 1995	$184,069,126	$152,498,032	$336,567,158	#253	#438	$100 million	
Batman & Robin	June 20, 1997	$107,353,792	$130,881,927	$238,235,719	#681	#685	$125 million	
Batman Begins	June 15, 2005	$206,863,479	$166,809,514	$373,672,993	#206	#363	$150 million	
The Dark Knight	July 18, 2008	$534,987,076	$471,115,201	$1,006,102,277	#13 #33^{(A)}	#49	$185 million	
The Dark Knight Rises	July 20, 2012	$448,149,584	$633,003,513	$1,081,153,097	#22 #73^{(A)}	#32	$250 million	
Batman v Superman: Dawn of Justice	March 25, 2016	$330,360,194	$543,277,334	$873,637,528	#71 #212^{(A)}	#73	$250 million	
Batman: The Killing Joke	July 25, 2016	$3,775,000	$687,034	$4,462,034	—N/a	—N/a	$3.5 million	
The Lego Batman Movie	February 10, 2017	$175,936,671	$136,200,000	$312,136,671	#287	#489	$80 million	
Joker	October 4, 2019	$335,477,657	$738,968,073	$1,074,445,730	#65	#33	$55 million	
The Batman	March 4, 2022	$369,313,618	$401,000,000	$770,313,618	#50	#106	$200 million	
Total		$3,117,955,273	$3,798,799,766	$6,756,546,557	#5 #4^{(A)}	#10	$1.915 billion	
List indicator^{(A)} indicates the adjusted totals based on current ticket prices (calculated by Box Office Mojo).; Batman Begins and The Dark Knight gross includes 2012 re-releases.

=== Critical and public response ===
Film	Critical		Public
Film	Rotten Tomatoes	Metacritic	CinemaScore
Batman: The Movie	80% (35 reviews)	71 (4 reviews)	—N/a
Batman	77% (142 reviews)	69 (21 reviews)	A
Batman Returns	81% (95 reviews)	68 (23 reviews)	B
Batman: Mask of the Phantasm	83% (58 reviews)	—N/a	—N/a
Batman Forever	41% (73 reviews)	51 (23 reviews)	A−
Batman & Robin	11% (95 reviews)	28 (21 reviews)	C+
Batman Begins	85% (285 reviews)	70 (41 reviews)	A
The Dark Knight	94% (339 reviews)	84 (39 reviews)	A
The Dark Knight Rises	87% (376 reviews)	78 (45 reviews)	A
Batman v Superman: Dawn of Justice	28% (436 reviews)	44 (51 reviews)	B
Batman: The Killing Joke	35% (46 reviews)	—N/a	—N/a
The Lego Batman Movie	89% (313 reviews)	75 (48 reviews)	A−
Justice League	39% (411 reviews)	45 (52 reviews)	B+
Joker	68% (598 reviews)	59 (60 reviews)	B+
Zack Snyder's Justice League	71% (313 reviews)	54 (45 reviews)	—N/a
The Batman	85% (526 reviews)	72 (68 reviews)	A–

=== Accolades ===
==== Academy Awards ====
Award	Batman: The Motion Picture Anthology				The Dark Knight trilogy			DC Extended Universe		Joker films	The Batman films
Award	Batman	Batman Returns	Batman Forever	Batman & Robin	Batman Begins	The Dark Knight	The Dark Knight Rises	Batman v Superman: Dawn of Justice	Justice League	Joker	The Batman
Picture										Nominated	
Director										Nominated	
Actor										Won	
Supporting Actor						Won					
Adapted Screenplay										Nominated	
Cinematography			Nominated		Nominated	Nominated				Nominated	
Costume Design										Nominated	
Film Editing						Nominated				Nominated	
Makeup		Nominated				Nominated				Nominated	Nominated
Original Score										Won	
Production Design	Won					Nominated					
Sound (Note: Starting with the 93rd Academy Awards (2021), the Best Sound Mixing and Best Sound Editing categories were consolidated into a single Best Sound category.)			Nominated			Nominated				Nominated	Nominated
Sound Editing			Nominated			Won				Nominated	Nominated
Visual Effects		Nominated				Nominated					Nominated

==== British Academy Film Awards ====
Award	Batman: The Motion Picture Anthology				The Dark Knight trilogy			DC Extended Universe		Joker films	The Batman films
Award	Batman	Batman Returns	Batman Forever	Batman & Robin	Batman Begins	The Dark Knight	The Dark Knight Rises	Batman v Superman: Dawn of Justice	Justice League	Joker	The Batman
Film										Nominated	
Direction										Nominated	
Actor in a Leading Role										Won	
Supporting Actor	Nominated					Won					
Adapted Screenplay										Nominated	
Casting										Won	
Cinematography						Nominated				Nominated	Nominated
Costume Design	Nominated					Nominated					
Editing						Nominated				Nominated	
Makeup and Hair	Nominated	Nominated				Nominated				Nominated	Nominated
Original Music						Nominated				Won	
Production Design	Nominated				Nominated	Nominated				Nominated	Nominated
Sound	Nominated				Nominated	Nominated				Nominated	
Visual Effects	Nominated	Nominated			Nominated	Nominated	Nominated				Nominated

==== Saturn Awards ====
Award	Batman: The Motion Picture Anthology				The Dark Knight trilogy			DC Extended Universe		Joker films	The Batman films
Award	Batman	Batman Returns	Batman Forever	Batman & Robin	Batman Begins	The Dark Knight	The Dark Knight Rises	Batman v Superman: Dawn of Justice	Justice League	Joker	The Batman
Fantasy Film	Nominated	Nominated	Nominated	Nominated	Won						
Action / Adventure / Thriller Film						Won	Nominated				
Comic-to-Film Motion Picture								Nominated		Won	Nominated
Director		Nominated			Nominated	Nominated	Nominated				Won
Actor	Nominated				Won	Nominated	Nominated			Nominated	Nominated
Actress						Nominated					
Supporting Actor		Nominated			Nominated	Won (Note: Received one award out of two nominations in this category.)	Nominated				Nominated (Note: Received two nominations in this category.)
Supporting Actress	Nominated				Nominated		Won			Nominated	
Writing					Won	Won				Nominated	Nominated
Costume Design	Nominated	Nominated	Nominated	Nominated	Nominated	Nominated					Won
Editing											Nominated
Make-up	Nominated	Won	Nominated	Nominated		Nominated					Nominated
Music					Nominated	Won	Nominated				Nominated
Production Design										Nominated	Nominated
Special Effects			Nominated		Nominated	Won					

== See also ==
- Batman franchise media
- Category:Fan films based on Batman
- Superman in film
- Catwoman (film)
