= Michael G. Wilson =

American-British screenwriter and film producer

Michael G. Wilson CBE
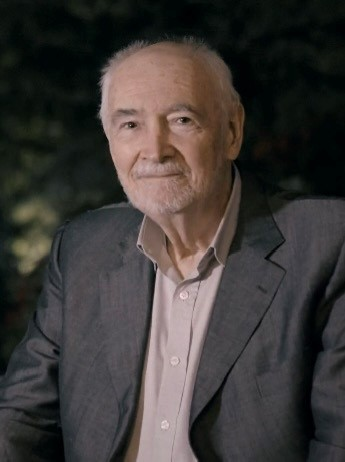
- Wilson in 2023
- Born: January 21, 1942 (age 84); New York City, U.S.
- Education: Harvey Mudd College (1963)
- Occupations: Screenwriter; film producer
- Years active: 1972–present
- Children: 2, including David G. Wilson
- Parent(s): Lewis Wilson; Dana Natol
- Relatives: Barbara Broccoli (half-sister); Albert R. Broccoli (step-father)
- Website: www.eon.co.uk

Michael Gregg Wilson, CBE (born January 21, 1942) is an American-British screenwriter and film producer, best known for his association with the James Bond film series.

== Background ==
Wilson was born in New York City, the son of Dana (née Natol) and actor Lewis Wilson. His father was the first actor to play the DC Comics character Batman in live action, which he did in the 1943 film serial Batman. He is the stepson of the James Bond producer Albert R. Broccoli and half-brother to Bond co-producer Barbara Broccoli. Wilson graduated from Harvey Mudd College in 1963 as an electrical engineer. He later studied law at Stanford University. After graduating, Wilson worked for the United States government and later a firm located in Washington, D.C. that specialized in international law.

Wilson was appointed Officer of the Order of the British Empire (OBE) in the 2008 New Year Honours and Commander of the Order of the British Empire (CBE) in the 2022 New Year Honours for services to film, drama, philanthropy and skills, both alongside Barbara Broccoli. Wilson was awarded the British Film Institute Fellowship in 2022. Wilson and Barbara Broccoli are founders of the London Screen Academy.

In 2010, Wilson was given The Royal Photographic Society's award for Outstanding Service to Photography, which carries with it an Honorary Fellowship of The Society. in 1998 Wilson and his wife Jane founded the Wilson Centre of Photography, a facility for research on the history, aesthetics and preservation of photographs. The Centre has an active programme that includes exhibition collaborations and loans for international museums and galleries.

Wilson is Honorary Vice President of the Science Museum Foundation, Fellow of the Science Museum London, as well as Trustee for the Carnegie Institution for Science and Harvey Mudd College.

== James Bond franchise ==
In 1972, Wilson joined Danjaq and Eon Productions, the companies responsible for the James Bond film series dating back to 1962, beginning with his stepfather Albert R. 'Cubby' Broccoli and Harry Saltzman. Wilson specifically worked in the legal department until taking on a more active role as an assistant to Cubby Broccoli for the film The Spy Who Loved Me (1977). In 1979 Wilson became executive producer of the film Moonraker and since has been an executive producer or producer in every James Bond film, currently co-producing with his half-sister Barbara Broccoli.

Wilson collaborated five times with veteran Bond screenwriter Richard Maibaum, starting in 1981 with For Your Eyes Only. In 1989, Wilson was forced to finish the screenplay to Licence to Kill alone due to a strike by the Writers Guild of America West which prevented Maibaum from having any further involvement. For both, this was their final James Bond script, as Maibaum died in 1991 and Wilson ceased writing, although he outlined a never-produced film in the series with writer Alfonse Ruggiero, scrapped due to internal legal issues between Eon and MGM (the following film, GoldenEye, being a completely different story written by Michael France).

In addition to his production duties, Wilson has also made many cameo appearances (speaking and non-speaking) in the Bond films. His first appearance, long before becoming a producer, was in Goldfinger in which he appeared as a soldier. Wilson has made cameo appearances in every Eon-produced Bond film since 1977. In February 2025, Wilson and Broccoli announced that they would be ceding creative control of the Bond franchise to Amazon MGM Studios for a reported $1 billion, forming "a new joint venture to house the James Bond intellectual property rights".

== Personal life ==
Wilson and his wife Jane have two sons: A younger son, Gregg Wilson, and an older son, David G. Wilson, both of whom work at Eon Productions.

== Filmography ==
=== Executive producer ===
- Moonraker (1979)
- For Your Eyes Only (1981)
- Octopussy (1983)
- Film Stars Don't Die in Liverpool (2017)

=== Producer with Albert R. Broccoli ===
- A View to a Kill (1985)
- The Living Daylights (1987)
- Licence to Kill (1989)

=== Producer with Barbara Broccoli ===
- GoldenEye (1995)
- Tomorrow Never Dies (1997)
- The World Is Not Enough (1999)
- Die Another Day (2002)
- Casino Royale (2006)
- Quantum of Solace (2008)
- Skyfall (2012)
- Spectre (2015)
- The Rhythm Section (2020)
- No Time to Die (2021)

=== Screenwriter (with Richard Maibaum) ===
- For Your Eyes Only (1981)
- Octopussy (1983)
- A View to a Kill (1985)
- The Living Daylights (1987)
- Licence to Kill (1989)

== Awards and nominations ==
Year	Association	Category	Work	Result	Ref.
2013	BAFTA	Outstanding British Film	Skyfall	Won	
2013	Producers Guild of America	David O. Selznick Achievement Award in Theatrical Motion Pictures		Honored	
2022	Will Rogers Motion Picture Pioneers Foundation	Pioneers of the Year Award		Honored	
2025	Academy Awards	Irving G. Thalberg Memorial Award		Honored	
