= Wayne Manor =

Fictional home of Batman

Wayne Manor Estate
- Batman location
- Wayne Manor in Batman vol. 3 #16 (April 2017); Art by David Finch
- First appearance: Detective Comics #28; June 1939
- Created by: Bob Kane; Bill Finger
- Genre: Superhero comics

In-universe information
- Type: Mansion
- Locations: Gotham City
- Characters: Bruce Wayne; Thomas Wayne; Martha Wayne; Alfred Pennyworth; Dick Grayson; Lance Bruner; Barbara Gordon; Jason Todd; Tim Drake; Stephanie Brown; Damian Wayne; Duke Thomas; Cassandra Cain; Claire Clover; Julia Pennyworth
- Publisher: DC Comics

Wayne Manor is a fictional mansion appearing in American comic books published by DC Comics. It is the home of Bruce Wayne, owner of Wayne Enterprises, who is also the superhero Batman.

The house is depicted as a large mansion on the outskirts of Gotham City and is maintained by the Wayne family's butler, Alfred Pennyworth. While the earliest stories showed Bruce Wayne buying the house himself, by the 1950s at the latest, retroactive continuity established that the manor had belonged to the Wayne family for several generations. Along with serving as a personal residence, the mansion sits above the Batcave, which Batman uses as his secret headquarters. The vast majority of DC Comics references place Wayne Manor just outside of Gotham City in the state of New Jersey.

The manor, indicative of Wayne's ancestral wealth, is designed in a Gothic Revival architectural style, matching the Gothic architecture present in Gotham. For live-action films, English country house locations in Nottinghamshire, Hertfordshire, and Buckinghamshire, as well as Stevenson Taylor Hall in New York, have been used to depict Wayne Manor.

Wayne Manor appears in the 1960s Batman television series and in films Batman (1989), Batman Returns (1992), Batman Forever (1995), Batman & Robin (1997), in The Dark Knight Trilogy (2005–2012), in the DC Extended Universe (2016–2023) and The Batman (2022).

== Depiction ==
=== Mansion grounds ===
Wayne Manor with Gotham City in the distance from Detective Comics #967 (December 2017). Art by Álvaro Martínez and Raúl Fernández.

Wayne Manor is depicted in earlier comics as being on the outskirts of Gotham City in the state of New Jersey. Comic book portrayals place the mansion within driving distance of Gotham City, close enough that the Bat-Signal can be seen from Wayne Manor alerting Batman of distress in the city.

Wayne Manor's grounds include a surrounding gate around the perimeter with a larger front gate at the main entrance. Batman's subterranean headquarters, the Batcave, is located beneath the mansion.

The grounds also includes a large hill that was partially hollowed out for Batman's aerial vehicles, with the most prominent being the Batcave, and there is also an underground river system that is large enough to accommodate docking space for the Batboat and has a large opening for said vehicle. Counter-intelligence satellites conceal the departure and entrance of the Bat-Vehicles from the Manor grounds.

==== Batman: The Return of Bruce Wayne ====
In Batman: The Return of Bruce Wayne, it is revealed that Wayne Manor was designed by Nathan Van Derm for Darius Wayne, forming a stylized "W". The gardens that existed when the manor was built added to the shape of the building, creating an image of a bat.

==== Following the events of Cataclysm ====
During the events of Batman: Cataclysm a massive earthquake struck Gotham City, the epicenter of which was less than a mile from Wayne Manor. The mansion was seriously damaged, as was the cave network beneath. The ground beneath the mansion shifted significantly, and actually revealed the Batcave below, although the Bat-family were able to relocate all of Batman's equipment before official rescue came to the manor so that nobody would learn Bruce Wayne's secrets. The original Manor was damaged beyond repair, forcing Bruce Wayne to redesign the Manor along with the Batcave. The new Manor is a veritable fortress, a pastiche of Gothic architecture combined with features of castellated architecture. Solar panels are installed in the new Manor, providing sustainable and environmentally-friendly electricity generation for the complex. It also includes a heliport for commercial helicopters.

==== Batman Eternal/Arkham Manor ====
During Batman Eternal, Hush's machinations result in Wayne Enterprises being ruined and Bruce Wayne essentially bankrupt after the villain detonates various weapons caches Batman had concealed around Gotham. As part of this bankruptcy, Wayne Manor is repossessed by the city and turned into the new Arkham Asylum following the destruction of the original, but Bruce decides to accept this new status quo, reasoning that he can at least make sure that his enemies remain contained in the new manor given his intimate knowledge of its entrances and exits.

The manor is eventually reclaimed by Bruce's lawyers, but it is temporarily left empty due to Bruce's death and amnesic resurrection as Alfred wanted to give Bruce a chance to have a life without Batman. However, Bruce returns to the manor when he realizes who he used to be.

==== Gotham War ====
In Gotham War, Batman loses most of his money to the Joker. Afterward, Vandal Savage buys Wayne Manor and the Batcave.

=== Access to the Batcave ===
Wayne Manor with its surrounding gate in Batman vol. 3, #42 (May 2017). Art by Mikel Janín.

The manor grounds include the Batcave, an extensive cave system that Bruce Wayne discovered as a boy and uses as his base of operations. Its method of access has varied, though it is typically accessible from a hidden door behind a grandfather clock.

=== The Wayne Foundation Penthouse ===
While these grounds are the regular home of Bruce Wayne, he temporarily vacated it in the stories from the late 1960s to the early 1980s, preferring to live in a penthouse apartment on top of the Wayne Foundation building in the city, which also included a secret sub-basement acting as a Batcave.

Wayne came to this decision when Dick Grayson went off to college, which led him to decide that the mansion was now impractical with only one resident and one servant. Furthermore, Wayne decided he wanted to be closer to his main field of operations in Gotham City than a home situated outside the main urban area would allow. However, by the early 1980s, Wayne came to reconsider that purpose and decided that being less accessible to the public was more advantageous for his Batman activities and returned to Wayne Manor.

== Other versions ==
Wayne Manor in Batman and the Outsiders vol. 2, #13 (Jan. 2009). Art by Fernando Dagnino.

=== Vampire Batman ===
In Batman & Dracula: Red Rain, Wayne Manor is destroyed as part of a plan to destroy Dracula's vampire family; after Batman attacked the vampires in the sewers and provoked them into chasing him back to the Batcave, he set off a series of pre-planted explosives to expose the cave's interior just as the sun rose. Although the manor collapses into the cavern system after a second series of bombs are set off, thus concealing Bruce Wayne's secret, Batman and Alfred relocate to a brownstone in the center of town, the now-vampiric Batman residing in a mausoleum in the basement while Alfred prepares his equipment in the main house. Although Alfred and Gordon stake Batman at the conclusion of Batman: Bloodstorm after he succumbs to his vampire instincts and drinks the Joker's blood, he is restored to life after Alfred removes the stake in Crimson Mist, subsequently relocating to the catacombs underneath the remains of Wayne Manor. The manor's remains are finally destroyed for good when Gordon, Alfred, Two-Face, Killer Croc, and Two-Face's gang plant bombs on the cave roof, exposing the interior to sunlight and ending Batman's reign of terror once and for all.

=== Kingdom Come ===
In Kingdom Come, the Manor was mostly destroyed by Two-Face and Bane after Batman's true identity was exposed; the Batcave, however, remained relatively untouched. By the end of the graphic novel, the Manor has been rebuilt as a hospital/hospice for Gulag battle victims.

== In other media ==
=== Television ===
==== Live-action television series ====
- Wayne Manor appears in Batman (1966). The exteriors of the manor were shot at 380 South San Rafael Avenue in Pasadena, California. The Batcave's exterior was filmed in Bronson Canyon, while the interiors were shot at various soundstages.
- Wayne Manor appears in Gotham and Pennyworth, portrayed by the Stevenson Taylor Hall in the Webb Institute. In the former series, it is destroyed in the fifth season before being rebuilt.
- Wayne Manor appears in Titans, portrayed by Casa Loma (which has also depicted the X-Mansion.

==== Animated television series ====
- Wayne Manor appears in the DC Animated Universe series Batman: The Animated Series, The New Batman Adventures, Batman Beyond, Justice League, and Justice League Unlimited. Its design is similar to previous versions, but includes an art deco aesthetic.
- Wayne Manor appears in The Batman. The Batcave's entrance is initially hidden behind a video game machine before being replaced with the traditional grandfather clock.
- Wayne Manor appears in the Batman: The Brave and the Bold episode "The Color of Revenge!".
- Wayne Manor appears in the DC Super Hero Girls episode "#TweenTitans".
- Wayne Manor appears in the Scooby-Doo and Guess Who? episode "What a Night, for a Dark Knight!".

=== Film ===
==== Live-action films ====
- Wayne Manor appears in the Batman (1943) and Batman and Robin serials. The former originated the use of a grandfather clock as an entrance to the Batcave.
- Wayne Manor appears in Batman (1989) portrayed by Knebworth House for its exterior and Hatfield House for its interior. In Batman Returns, an original scale model was used for the exteriors of Wayne Manor. In the sequel, the passageway to the Batcave is uncovered by turning on the lights of an ornament in a nearby aquarium and dropping through a false floor in an iron maiden, although Alfred does quip that he'll "take the stairs".
- Wayne Manor appears in Batman Forever, Batman & Robin and Joker, portrayed by The Braes.
- Wayne Manor appears in The Dark Knight trilogy, portrayed initially by Mentmore Towers and later by Wollaton Hall. It is destroyed by Ra's al Ghul in Batman Begins before being rebuilt by the time of The Dark Knight Rises.
- Wayne Manor appears in films set in the DC Extended Universe, initially portrayed via CGI and modeled after Sutton Scarsdale Hall and later portrayed by Burghley House. It is destroyed in a fire prior to the events of Batman v Superman: Dawn of Justice before being rebuilt by the events of The Flash.
- In The Batman (2022), Wayne resides in an urban tower inspired by Liverpool and Glasgow architecture, rather than a suburban manor.

==== Gallery ====
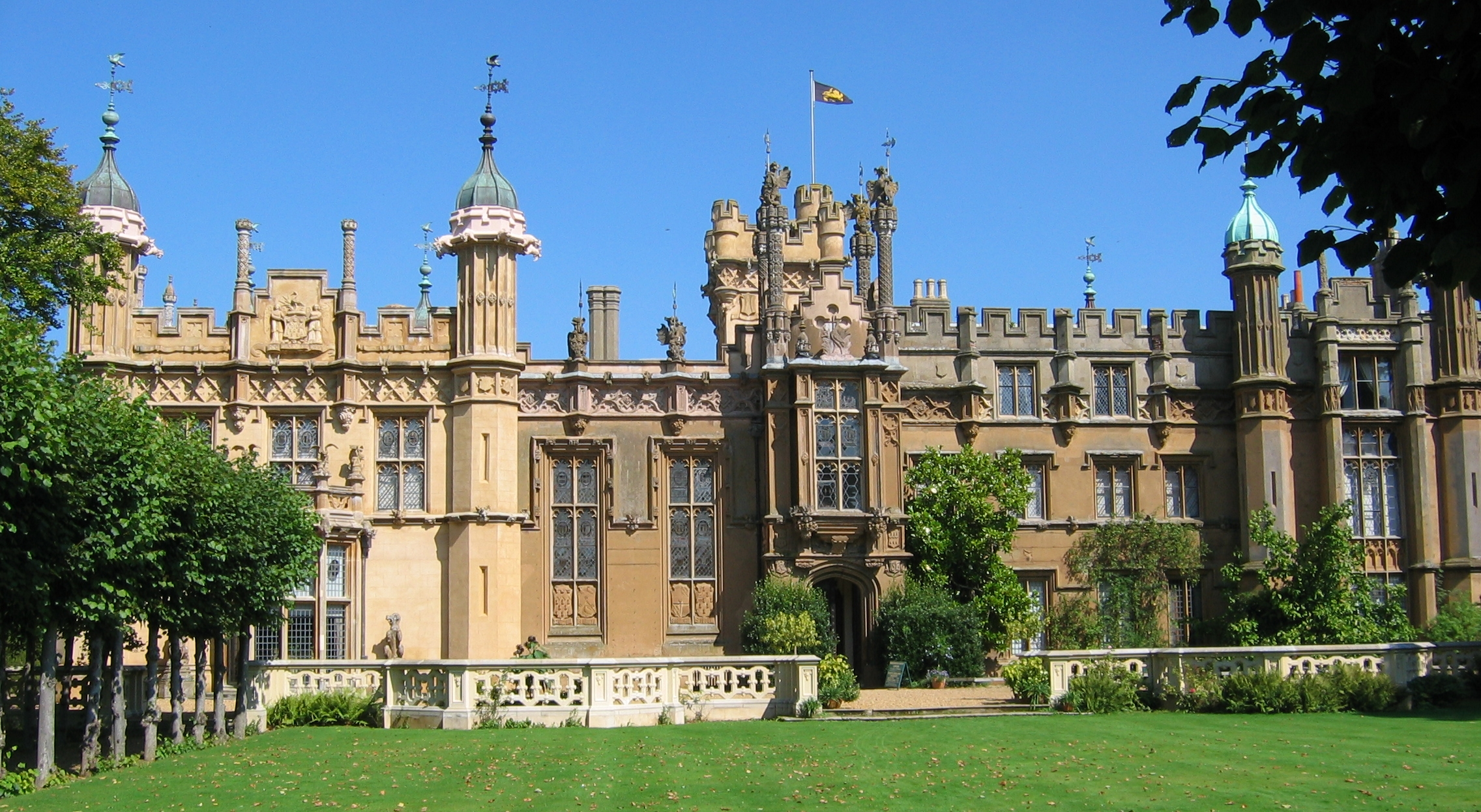
Knebworth House was used for the exterior of the 1989 Batman film.

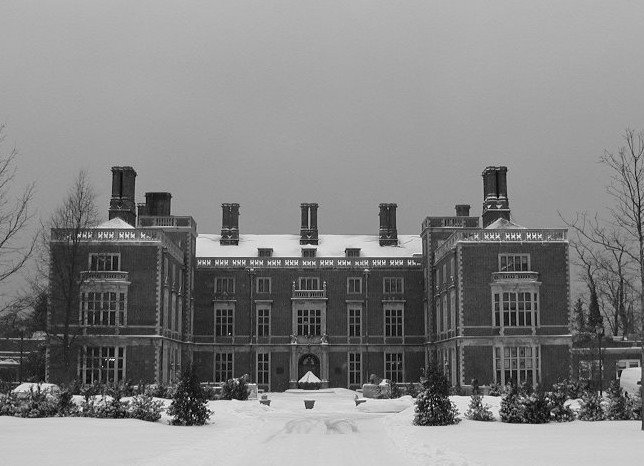
Stevenson Taylor Hall, Webb Institute in Glen Cove, New York, was used as Wayne Manor in Batman Forever, Batman & Robin, Joker 2019 film and TV series Gotham, and Pennyworth.

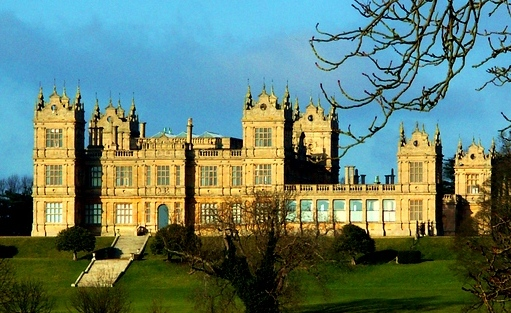
Mentmore Towers was used for exterior shots in Batman Begins.

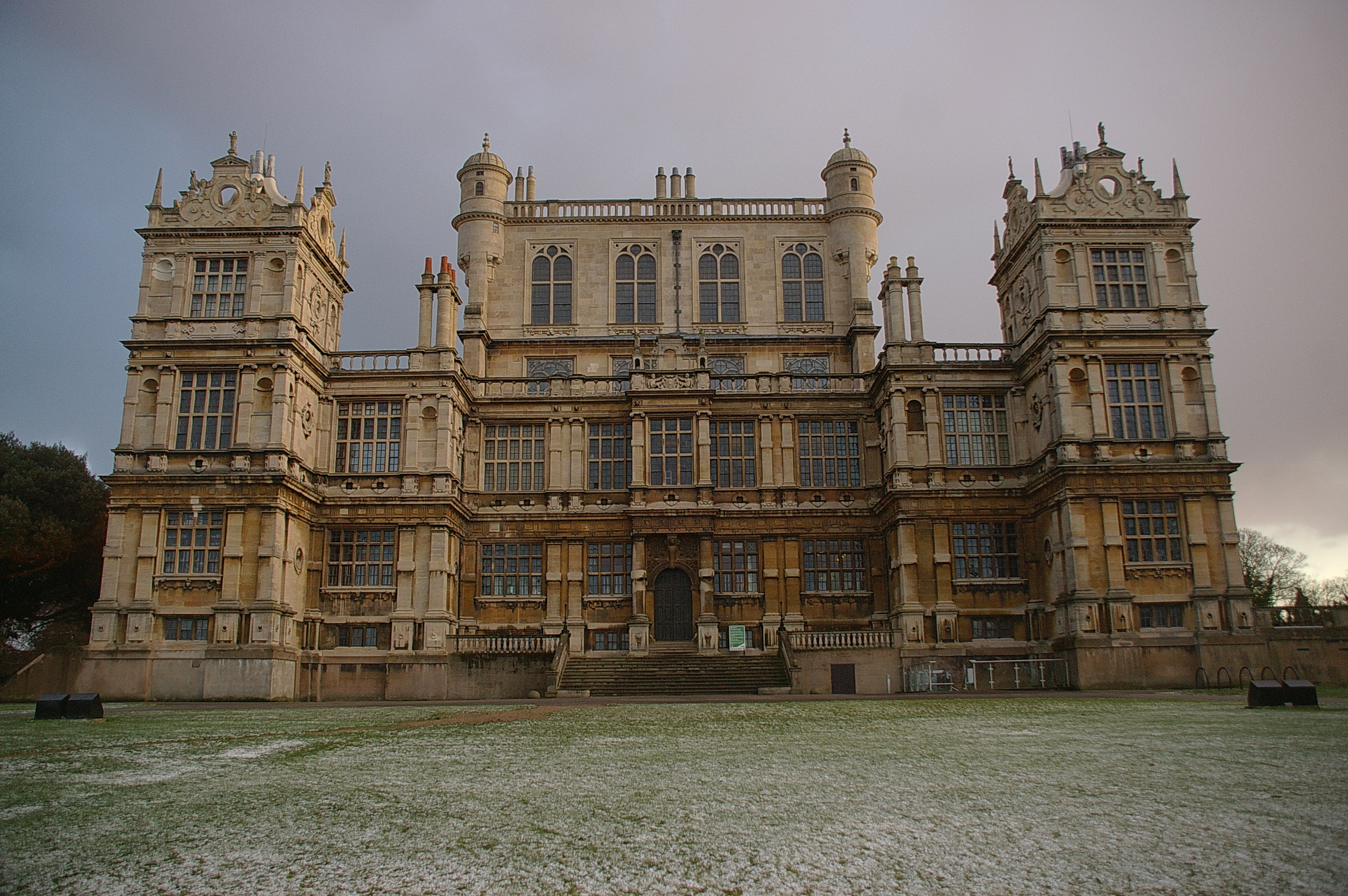
Wollaton Hall was used as Wayne Manor in The Dark Knight Rises.

==== Animated films ====
- Wayne Manor makes a minor appearance in Batman: Under the Red Hood.
- Wayne Manor, based on its depiction in Batman: Year One, appears in the comic's film adaptation.
- Wayne Manor appears in Batman: The Dark Knight Returns. It is destroyed during Batman's battle with Superman in Gotham City after Alfred activates a self-destruct sequence.
- An alternate timeline variant of Wayne Manor appears in Justice League: The Flashpoint Paradox.
- Wayne Manor appears in The Lego Batman Movie.

=== Video games ===
- An alternate universe variant of Wayne Manor appears in Injustice: Gods Among Us.
- Wayne Manor appears in the Batman: Arkham series. In Batman: Arkham Knight, it is destroyed when Batman activates the Knightfall Protocol after Scarecrow exposes his secret identity.

=== Miscellaneous ===
The lyrics to the song "She Looks Like Fun" on the album Tranquility Base Hotel and Casino by Arctic Monkeys mention Wayne Manor.
