= Wild Women (1951 film) =

1951 American film

- Release poster under the film's alternative title
- Directed by: Norman Dawn
- Written by: Norman Dawn
- Produced by: Morris M. Landres; Harold Rosemont
- Starring: Lewis Wilson; Dana Broccoli; Mort Thompson; Clarence Brooks
- Cinematography: Norman Dawn
- Edited by: Guido L. Redaelli
- Music by: Gordon Zahler
- Production company: Norman Dawn Productions
- Distributed by: Continental Pictures
- Release date: September 23, 1951
- Running time: 62 minutes
- Country: United States
- Language: English

Wild Women is a 1951 American adventure film directed by Norman Dawn and starring Lewis Wilson, Dana Broccoli, Mort Thompson and Clarence Brooks. A low-budget production which utilized stock footage, it is also known by the alternative titles of Bowanga Bowanga and White Sirens of Africa.

== Plot ==
An American big game hunter named Trent and his friend an Italian count are on safari in Africa. They encounter a tribe of amazons, fearsome female warriors that bring back memories of Trent's living in the area as a boy.

== Cast ==
- Lewis Wilson as Trent
- Dana Broccoli as Queen
- Mort Thompson as Kirby
- Don Orlando as Count Sparafucile
- Clarence Brooks as Sungu
- Charlene Hawks as Owoona
- Frances Dubay as High Priestess
- Leah Wakefield as Head Conspirator
- Zona Siggins as Ulama Girl
- Devvy Davenport as Ulama Girl
- Mary Brandon as Ulama Girl
- Mary Lou Miner as Ulama Girl
- Barbara Reynolds as Ulama Girl
- Joyce Nevins as Ulama Girl
