= Chubby Johnson =

American character actor and journalist

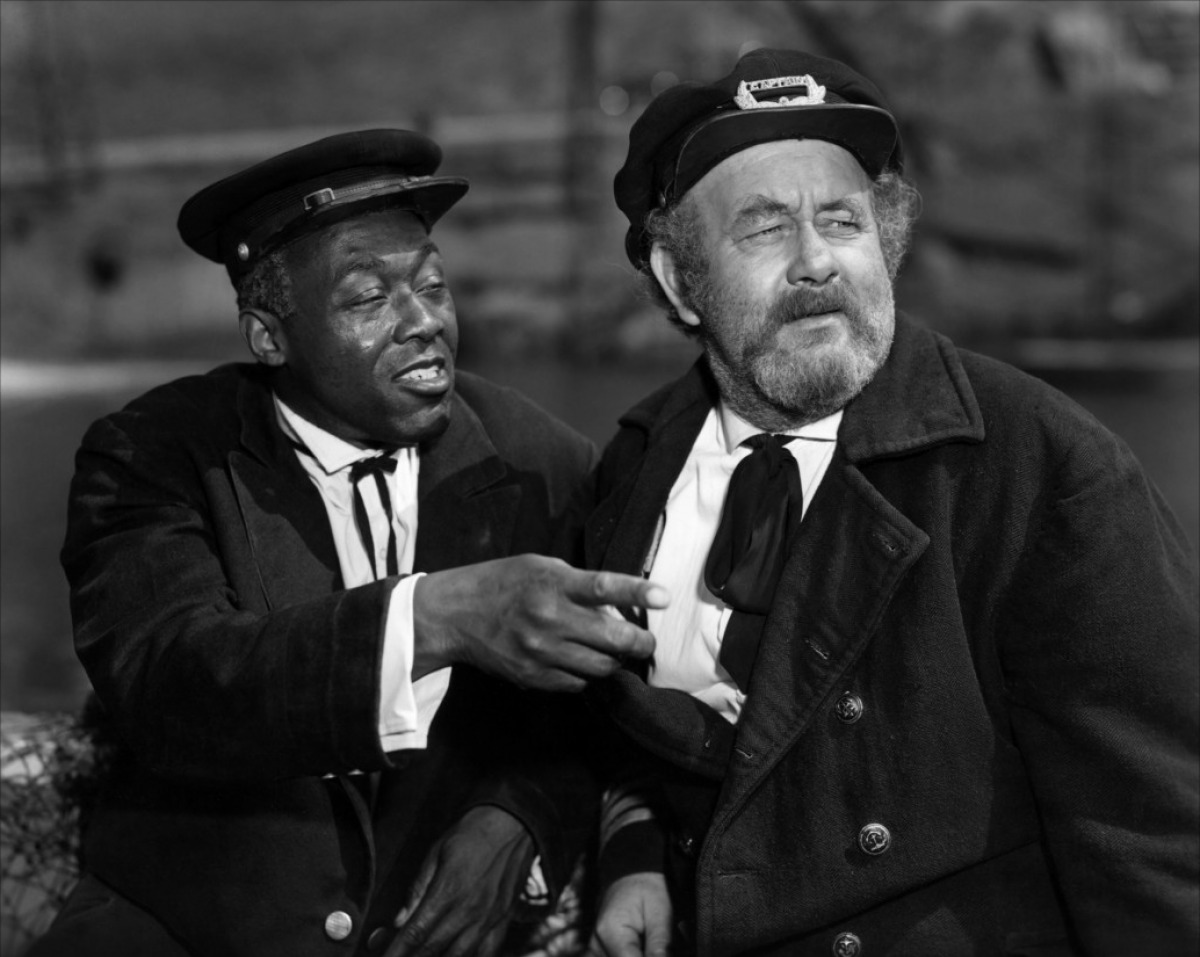
- Stepin Fetchit and Chubby Johnson (right)
- Born: Charles Randolph Johnson; August 13, 1903; Terre Haute, Indiana, U.S.
- Died: October 31, 1974 (aged 71); Hollywood, California, U.S.
- Occupations: Actor, journalist
- Years active: 1946-1972

Charles Randolph "Chubby" Johnson (August 13, 1903 – October 31, 1974) was an American film and television supporting character actor with a genial demeanor and warm, country-accented voice.

== Early years ==
Johnson was the son of entertainers. His father was a comedian in vaudeville, and his mother was a concert pianist. As a child, Johnson performed with his father in vaudeville.

== Career ==
Before he became an actor, Johnson was a journalist whose employers included the Las Vegas Sun. He also acted on stage, including a five-year span during which he appeared in a new play each week at the Warner Egyptian Theater in Pasadena.

Beginning with the Randolph Scott Western Abilene Town, in which he had an uncredited part as a homesteader, Johnson made more than 80 screen appearances between 1946 and 1972.

Johnson appeared in eight roles between 1957 and 1961 in the ABC/Warner Bros. television series Maverick, usually playing a stagecoach driver or deputy. His Maverick episodes were Louis L'Amour's "Stage West" (with James Garner) as a stagecoach depot manager, "The Strange Journey of Jenny Hill" (with Garner) as a drunken messenger in an alley, "Pappy" (with Garner and Jack Kelly) as a whiskey-serving storekeeper, "The Sheriff of Duck 'n' Shoot" (with Garner and Kelly) as a comically loquacious deputy, "The Misfortune Teller" (with Garner) as a different deputy, "The Maverick Line" (with Garner and Kelly) as an obstreperous stagecoach driver, "Destination Devil's Flat" (with Kelly) as another deputy, and "The Cactus Switch" (with Kelly and Roger Moore) as another stagecoach driver.

In 1959, Johnson was cast as Sheriff Ed Wilson in the episode "The Twisted Road" of the syndicated Western series, Frontier Doctor. That same year, he played the stagecoach driver first suspected as a fraud in the episode "The Avengers" (May 12, 1959) of the ABC/Warner Bros. Western series Sugarfoot starring Will Hutchins.

In 1960, Johnson portrayed Jessie Turnbull in the episode "The Last Days of Jessie Turnbull" in the ABC Western/Detective drama titled The Man from Blackhawk starring Robert Rockwell. Johnson appeared that same year as Charlie Pringle in an episode of Boris Karloff's anthology television series Thriller titled "The Big Blackout". He performed in 1960 as well on The Andy Griffith Show in the episode "A Feud is a Feud". As he sometimes did, especially in some of his roles in Westerns, Johnson portrayed his character in this episode with his lower dental bridge removed, giving him a snaggletoothed appearance and enhancing the authenticity of his persona as a mountain man.

From 1962 to 1972, he appeared eight times on NBC's Bonanza. In the 1960s, Johnson appeared four times on CBS's Gunsmoke, three times on ABC's The Guns of Will Sonnett starring Walter Brennan, and three times on ABC's The Rifleman, first in 1960 as Kansas Sawyer in the episode "The Horse Trader", then in 1960 as Mr. Avery in "The Spoiler", and again in 1962 in "Guilty Conscience" as the old man.

Johnson guest-starred three times as Buzz, the salvage man, on the CBS children's sitcom, Dennis the Menace. Johnson's episodes are "The School Play" and "Dennis and the Pee Wee League" (both 1961), and "The Treasure Chest" (1962).

In the 1950s Western-themed adventure series Sky King, Johnson played Jim Bell, the ranch foreman. In 1963, he was cast as Concho in several episodes of NBC's Temple Houston. Late in his career, he appeared twice on the syndicated Western anthology series, Death Valley Days.

== Later years ==
Johnson lived in the Tarzana neighborhood of Los Angeles. As honorary mayor of Tarzana, he participated in numerous activities of the chamber of commerce, which resulted in his receiving the group's top recognition for community service.

== Death ==
On October 31, 1974, Johnson died of unknown causes at Cedars of Lebanon Hospital at age 71.

== Partial filmography ==
- Abilene Town (1946) - Homesteader (uncredited)
- Rocky Mountain (1950) (with Errol Flynn) - Gil Craigie - Stage Driver
- Frenchie (1950) - Miner (uncredited)
- Night Riders of Montana (1951) - Sheriff Skeeter Davis
- The Scarf (1951) - Feed Store Manager (uncredited)
- Wells Fargo Gunmaster (1951) - Skeeter Davis
- Fort Worth (1951) (with Randolph Scott) - Sheriff
- Lost Continent (1951) - Bunker 'Suit' (uncredited)
- Fort Dodge Stampede (1951) - Skeeter Davis
- The Raging Tide (1951) (with Shelley Winters) - 'General' Ball
- Westward the Women (1951) - Jim Stacey - Awaiting Groom (uncredited)
- Here Come the Nelsons (1952) (with Ozzie and Harriet) - Tex, Man at Fair
- Bend of the River (1952) (with James Stewart) - Cap'n Mello
- The Treasure of Lost Canyon (1952) (with William Powell) - Baltimore Dan
- Apache War Smoke (1952) - Juke (uncredited)
- High Noon (1952) - Old Timer on Hotel Porch (uncredited)
- Sky Full of Moon (1952) - Powder Horn Stationmaster (uncredited)
- Last of the Comanches (1953) (with Broderick Crawford) - Henry Ruppert
- Gunsmoke (1953) (with Audie Murphy) - Doc Farrell
- Law and Order (1953) (with Ronald Reagan, Dorothy Malone, and Preston Foster) - Denver Cahoon
- Calamity Jane (1953) (with Doris Day) - Rattlesnake
- Back to God's Country (1953) (with Rock Hudson) - Shorter
- Overland Pacific (1954) (with Jock Mahoney) - Sheriff Blaney
- The Far Country (1954) (with James Stewart and Walter Brennan) - Dusty
- The Human Jungle (1954) - Greenie
- Cattle Queen of Montana (1954) (with Barbara Stanwyck and Ronald Reagan) - Nat Collins
- Rage at Dawn (1955) - Hyronemus (uncredited)
- Headline Hunters (1955) - Ned Powers
- Tennessee's Partner (1955) - Grubstake McNiven
- Tribute to a Bad Man (1956; with James Cagney) - Baldy
- The Rawhide Years (1956) - Gif Lessing
- The Fastest Gun Alive (1956) - Frank Stringer
- The First Texan (1956) (with Joel McCrea and Felicia Farr) - Deaf Smith
- The Young Guns (1956) - Rongo Jones / Grandpa
- Drango (1957) (with Jeff Chandler and Joanne Dru) - Zeb
- The True Story of Jesse James (1957) - Arkew
- The River's Edge (1957) (with Ray Milland and Anthony Quinn) - Whiskers
- Gunfire at Indian Gap (1957) - Samuel
- Maverick (1960, TV Series) - Stagecoach driver
- The Firebrand (1962) - Tampico
- Twilight of Honor (1963) - Gannon, Jailer (uncredited)
- 7 Faces of Dr. Lao (1964) - Fat Cowboy
- Cyborg 2087 (1966) (with Michael Rennie) - Uncle Pete
- The Adventures of Bullwhip Griffin (1967) - First Haircut Man (uncredited)
- The Wild Wild West (1967, TV Series) - Sherriff / desert rat prospector
- Support Your Local Sheriff! (1969) (with James Garner and Walter Brennan) - Brady (scenes deleted)
- Sam Whiskey (1969) (with Burt Reynolds) - Blacksmith
- Bonanza (1962–1972, TV Series) - Old Man / John Baines / Cash / Clyde / Abner Ledbetter / Sam Sneden / Sam / Toby Barker (8 episodes) (final appearance)
