= Night Riders of Montana =

1951 film by Fred C. Brannon

- Theatrical release poster
- Directed by: Fred C. Brannon
- Screenplay by: M. Coates Webster
- Produced by: Gordon Kay
- Starring: Allan Lane; Chubby Johnson; Roy Barcroft; Claudia Barrett; Arthur Space; Myron Healey
- Cinematography: John MacBurnie
- Edited by: Irving M. Schoenberg
- Music by: Stanley Wilson
- Production company: Republic Pictures
- Distributed by: Republic Pictures
- Release date: February 28, 1951
- Running time: 60 minutes
- Country: United States
- Language: English
- Budget: $55,200

Night Riders of Montana is a 1951 American Western film directed by Fred C. Brannon, written by M. Coates Webster and starring Allan Lane, Chubby Johnson, Roy Barcroft, Claudia Barrett, Arthur Space and Myron Healey. The film was released on February 28, 1951 by Republic Pictures.

== Cast ==
- Allan Lane as Rocky Lane
- Black Jack as Black Jack
- Chubby Johnson as Sheriff Skeeter Davis
- Roy Barcroft as Henchman Brink
- Claudia Barrett as Julie Bauer
- Arthur Space as Roger Brandon
- Myron Healey as Steve Bauer
- Mort Thompson as Jim Foster
- Marshall Bradford as Sam Foster
- Lester Dorr as Drummer
- Ted Adams as Henchman Connors
- George Chesebro as Hank Jamison
- Don C. Harvey as Henchman Janney
- Zon Murray as Joe
