= Dana Broccoli =

American actress (1922–2004)

- Born: Dana Natol; January 3, 1922; New York City, U.S.
- Died: February 29, 2004 (aged 82); Beverly Hills, California, U.S.
- Other names: Dana Wilson
- Occupation: Actress
- Spouses: Lewis Wilson (divorced) Albert R. Broccoli (m. 1959; died 1996)
- Children: 4, including Michael G. Wilson and Barbara Broccoli
- Relatives: David G. Wilson (grandson)

Dana Broccoli (née Natol, formerly Wilson; January 3, 1922 – February 29, 2004) was an American actress and novelist.

== Biography ==
Dana Natol was born on January 3, 1922, in New York City. She studied acting at Cecil Clovelly's Academy of Dramatic Arts at Carnegie Hall and worked on stage in New York and Boston. She married Batman actor Lewis Wilson, whom she had met when they were both students at the American Academy of Dramatic Arts, and they had a son, Michael G. Wilson. However, they separated after his service in the Army during World War II. After their divorce, she moved to Beverly Hills.

She worked as a screenwriter and had a number of small parts in films. There she met film producer Albert R. Broccoli. They married and Dana moved to London with him. There she worked with him behind the scenes on his production of the James Bond film series. With Broccoli she had a daughter, Barbara. She became the adoptive mother of her husband's two children by a previous marriage. She is credited as having recommended Sean Connery to her husband for the role. In the aftermath of her husband's death in 1996, Dana Broccoli became chairman of the company.

Broccoli also wrote the novels, Make with the Brains, Pierre (1946), issued in Britain as Scenario for Murder (1949) and Florinda (1977), the latter was adapted into the West End theatre musical, La Cava in 2000. Broccoli died in Beverly Hills, California on February 29, 2004, aged 82, of cancer.
