= Lewis Wilson =

American actor (1920–2000)

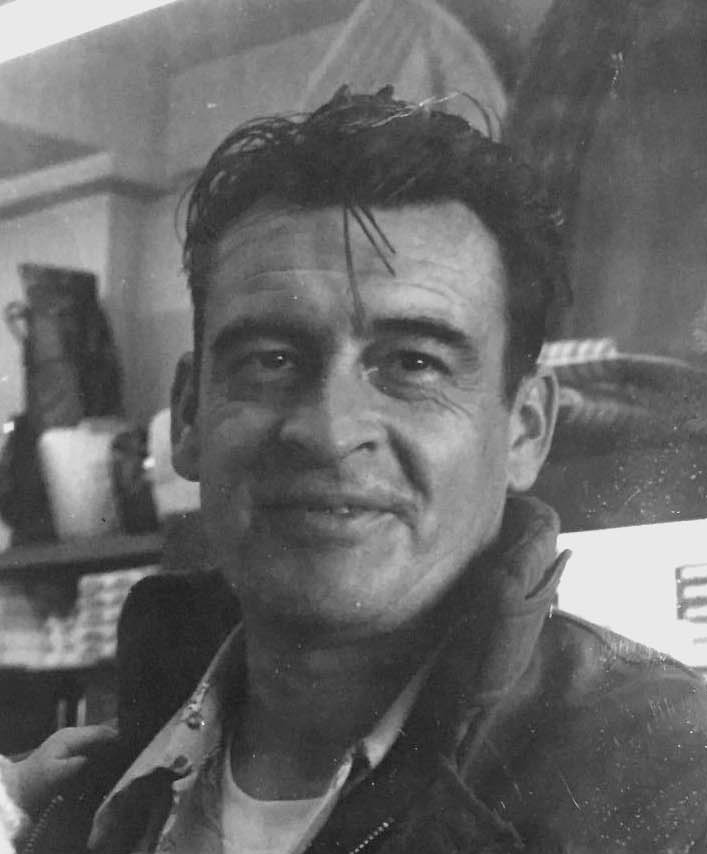
- Born: Lewis Gilbert Wilson; January 28, 1920; Framingham, Massachusetts, U.S.
- Died: August 9, 2000 (aged 80); San Francisco, California, U.S.
- Education: Worcester Academy
- Occupation: Actor
- Years active: 1943–1973
- Spouse: Dana Natol (divorced)
- Children: Michael G. Wilson
- Relatives: David G. Wilson (grandson)

Lewis Gilbert Wilson (January 28, 1920 – August 9, 2000) was an American actor. He was most famous for being the first actor to play DC Comics character Batman on screen in the 1943 film serial Batman.

== Life and career ==
Wilson was born January 28, 1920, in Framingham, Massachusetts, the son of Lucile (née Gregg) and John Henry Wilson. He grew up in Littleton, Massachusetts, where his father was minister of the First Unitarian Church from 1927 to 1945. Wilson graduated from Worcester Academy in Worcester, Massachusetts in 1939.

Following the entry of the United States into World War II, Columbia Pictures created the first Batman live action series in 1943, simply called Batman. Wilson was cast as the title character in the 15-episode serial against J. Carrol Naish who portrayed a Japanese spy named Dr. Daka. It was Wilson's screen debut at the age of 23. A sequel to the serial was made in 1949, but Robert Lowery replaced Wilson as Batman.

After the war concluded, Wilson and his family moved to California, and he and his wife joined the Pasadena Playhouse. His final film was Naked Alibi in 1954. He then left show business and worked for General Foods.

Wilson married novelist and actress Dana Natol, and they had a son, Michael G. Wilson. They met while attending the Academy of Dramatic Arts at Carnegie Hall in New York, but separated and divorced after moving to California.

After retiring from acting, Wilson lived in North Hollywood, California.

== Death ==
Wilson died on August 9, 2000, in San Francisco, California, at age 80. His death was not widely reported. Wilson is survived by his wife Jane and their two sons, both of whom work at Eon Productions.

== Filmography ==
=== Film ===
Year	Title	Role	Notes
1943	Redhead from Manhattan	Paul	
1943	Good Luck, Mr. Yates	Parkhurst	Uncredited
1943	Batman	Bruce Wayne / Batman	Serial
1943	First Comes Courage	Dr. Kleinich	Uncredited
1943	My Kingdom for a Cook	Reporter	Uncredited
1943	There's Something About a Soldier	Thomas Bolivar Jefferson	
1943	Klondike Kate	George Graham	Uncredited
1944	The Racket Man	Captain Anderson	Uncredited
1944	Beautiful But Broke	Pilot	Uncredited
1944	Sailor's Holiday	Jerome 'Iron Man' Collins	
1944	Once Upon a Time	Man	Uncredited
1951	Wild Women	Trent	
1954	Naked Alibi	Border Patrol Officer	Uncredited

=== Television ===
Year	Title	Role	Notes
1952	Craig Kennedy, Criminologist	Walt Jameson	26 episodes
1973	Orson Welles' Great Mysteries	Police Sergeant	Episode: "Unseen Alibi"
