= Mort Thompson =

American actor (1903–1976)

- Born: Morton Clarkson Thompson; October 25, 1920; Eagle Rock, Los Angeles, California, U.S.
- Died: March 3, 2000 (aged 79)
- Education: Eagle Rock High School; Occidental College
- Occupations: Actor, stunt performer
- Years active: 1949–1973
- Spouse: Marjorie Van Dyke

Morton Clarkson Thompson (October 25, 1920 – March 3, 2000) was an American film and television actor and stuntman, perhaps best known as Capt. Charlie Kyser in Retreat, Hell!, and Kirby, the safari leader in Wild Women.

== Early life and career ==
Born in Imperial, California and raised in Eagle Rock, Thompson—along with sisters Cornelia and Kathleen, and younger brothers Dudley and Graham–was the second of five children born to Reuben Frank Thompson and Cornelia Elizabeth Shepherd. In 1939, he graduated from Eagle Rock High School, where he had excelled in both football and swimming, and served as Student Body President. Thompson continued his athletic endeavors at Occidental College—most notably with the school's diving team—while also making a mark in theatre, portraying Jack 'Ernest' Worthing in a production of Oscar Wilde's The Importance of Being Earnest.

In 1942, Thompson joined the United States Marines. Attending two years of officer training school and ultimately reaching the rank of Captain, he served in China and later Japan, at the Battle of Okinawa.

After the war, he returned to Occidental College, majoring in speech and serving as president of the Occidental Players. Prior to his graduation in 1947, Thompson portrayed Mortimer Brewster in Joseph Kesselring's Arsenic and Old Lace.

In November 1948, Thompson was signed by Paramount Pictures. Two months later, the Los Angeles Times reported that he was one of several actors—including Shelley Winters, William Phipps, and James Anderson—selected to participate in the Shakespearean repertory group led by Charles Laughton. However, despite rumors of an imminent Twelfth Night "holiday debut," the group did not in fact make its debut until the spring of 1950—and then not with Shakespeare, but rather Chekhov's The Cherry Orchard. By that point, however, it appears that conflicting commitments had compelled all but Phipps to abandon the project. For Thompson, these commitments included both an uncredited turn in Nicholas Ray's Flying Leathernecks and his first credited screen appearance, as Francis I. du Pont in The Du Pont Story.

On May 28, 1952, United World Films, a subsidiary of Universal Pictures, became front page news as The Hollywood Reporter broke the story of UWF's impending episodic television debut. Starring Thompson and veteran supporting player Cliff Clark, the series was entitled Fighting Man; it was to be directed by George Blair and supervised by Malcolm Boylan, with filming set to start, June 2. Yet despite subsequent trade paper reports echoing THR (including followups from Boxoffice, Broadcasting Telecasting, and Ross Reports on Television, confirming that filming had indeed begun with the personnel previously cited), no further update was ever published, nor does it appear that any portion of this projected series ever aired.

In October 1953, Thompson became the peculiarly conspicuous co-star of a Patrick Peyton/Family Theater Productions project entitled Inspiration, Please, a series of 12 one-minute TV spots debuting the following month. (Note: This series bears no relation to the like-named, religious-themed 1995 quiz show) Cast as himself (drawing on his own wartime experience at Okinawa), Thompson was the sole contemporary presenter amidst a roster otherwise composed solely of actors impersonating historical figures such as Ben Franklin, Abe Lincoln, Queen Victoria, Alexis Carrel, Patrick Henry, Louis Pasteur, Marconi, Marx, Jefferson, Joseph Haydn, Francis of Assisi, and Mother Teresa. Each of these figures—Thompson, included—was there to address the meaning of prayer and faith in one's life. Underwritten by Joseph P. Kennedy and scripted by Fred Niblo Jr. and John T. Kelley, the series was later awarded the Freedoms Foundation's George Washington Honor Medal for "outstanding achievement in helping to bring about a better understanding of the American Way of Life during 1953," at which time—March 1954—it was also reported that "more than 250 television stations in the country are telecasting this series daily."

Thompson's final credited screen appearance came on October 2, 1973, in "The Manhunter", the series premiere of Bill Bixby's The Magician.

== Personal life and death ==
On September 24, 1950, Thompson married actress Marjorie Van Dyke, a fellow Occidental College alumnus.

In 1965, it was reported that Thompson had recently converted to Nichiren Buddhism, joining the newly founded Soka Gakkai of America. When queried as to whether the religion's growth might not presage a revival of Japanese militarism and aggression, Thompson countered quickly.

I wouldn't be in it, if it did. Rather it is the antithesis of militarism. It is pacifistic. We've tried all other ways and they haven't worked. Maybe this movement will give the world peace. At least, I'm going to give it a try.

On March 3, 2000, Thompson died of undisclosed causes, survived by his brother Dudley.

== Selected filmography ==
- Samson and Delilah (1949) – Spectator
- Flying Leathernecks (1950) – 5th Pilot Replacement (uncredited)
- The Du Pont Story (1950) – Francis I. du Pont
- The Lone Ranger (1951) Season 2 Episode 24 "The Hooded Men" – Bill
- Night Riders of Montana (1951) – Jim Foster
- Starlift (1951) – Collins-First Sentry (uncredited)
- Father Takes the Air (1951) – Control Tower Operator (uncredited)
- Wild Women (1951) - Kirby
- Retreat, Hell! (1952) - Capt. Kyser
- The War of the Worlds (1953) – Reporter (uncredited)
- Inspiration, Please (1953) Season 1 Episode 12 – Himself
- This Is My Love (1954) – Dark-haired flirtatious lunch counter customer, first cafeteria scene (uncredited)
- Star Tonight (1955) Season Episode "Flame and Ice"
- Kraft Theatre (1956) Season 9 Episode 31 "A Night to Remember" – Other Passenger - Titanic
- Flight (1958) Season 1 Episode 19 "Japanese Code"
- Border Patrol (1959) Season 1 Episode 16 "Love, Death and Diamonds" – Bob Jamieson
- Loretta Young Show (1959) Season 7 Episode 7 "A New Step" – Nurse (uncredited)
- The Aquanauts (1960) Season 1 Episode 7 "Disaster Below"
- Hennesey (1962) Season 3 Episode 28 "The Best Man" – Aide
- Mutiny on the Bounty (1962) – Pirate (uncredited)
- The Travels of Jamie McPheeters
  - Season 1 Episode 13 "The Day of the Misfits" (1963) – Jakins
  - Season 1 Episode 21 "The Day of the Lame Duck" (1964) – Sergeant
- The Man from U.N.C.L.E. (1967) Season 4 Episode 4 "The Prince of Darkness: Part I" – Kharmusi's Henchman
- The Smith Family (1971) Season 2 Episode 9 "Ambush" – Second Detective
- What's Up, Doc? (1972) - Airport cab driver
- The Magician (1973) Season 1 Episode 1 "The Manhunters" - Driscoll
