= Batman (serial) =

1943 film serial directed by Lambert Hillyer

- Theatrical release poster
- Directed by: Lambert Hillyer
- Written by: Victor McLeod; Leslie Swabacker; Harry L. Fraser
- Based on: Batman by: Bill Finger; Bob Kane
- Produced by: Rudolph C. Flothow
- Starring: Lewis Wilson; Douglas Croft; J. Carrol Naish; Shirley Patterson
- Cinematography: James S. Brown Jr.
- Edited by: Dwight Caldwell; Earl Turner
- Music by: Lee Zahler
- Color process: Black and white
- Distributed by: Columbia Pictures
- Release date: July 16, 1943
- Running time: 15 chapters (260 minutes)
- Country: United States
- Language: English

Batman is a 1943 American 15-chapter theatrical serial from Columbia Pictures, produced by Rudolph C. Flothow, directed by Lambert Hillyer, that stars Lewis Wilson as Batman and Douglas Croft as his sidekick Robin. The serial is based on the DC Comics character Batman, who first appeared in Detective Comics #27 in May 1939. The villain is an original character named Dr. Daka, a secret agent of the Japanese Imperial government, played by J. Carrol Naish. Rounding out the cast are Shirley Patterson as Linda Page, Bruce Wayne's love interest, and William Austin as Alfred, the Wayne Manor butler.

The serial's storyline involves Batman, a secret U.S. government agent, attempting to defeat the schemes of Japanese agent Dr. Daka operating in Gotham City at the height of World War II. Serving Daka are his American henchmen.

Batman is notable for being the first appearance on film of Batman, and for introducing story elements that quickly became permanent parts of the Batman character's mythos, such as the Batcave and its secret entrance through a grandfather clock inside Wayne Manor. The serial also changed the course of how Alfred's physical appearance was depicted in future Batman stories. At the time Batman was released in theaters, Alfred was drawn as a portly gentleman in the comics. Subsequent issues suddenly depicted Alfred as slim and sporting a thin moustache, following actor William Austin's appearance.

The serial was commercially successful and in 1949 spawned another Columbia serial, Batman and Robin. The entire 1943 Batman serial was re-released to theaters three times: in 1954, 1962, and 1965. The latter reissue, now titled An Evening with Batman and Robin with all the chapters shown consecutively, proved very popular. Some theaters showed the 15 chapters as a weekend matinée, seven chapters on Saturday, and the remaining eight on Sunday. Its success inspired the action-comedy series Batman (and its 1966 theatrical feature film spin-off) starring Adam West and Burt Ward.

== Plot ==
The Batman / Bruce Wayne and his ward, Robin / Dick Grayson, secret government agents following the Japanese attack on Pearl Harbor, become aware of a Japanese sabotage ring operating in Gotham City. Bruce's girlfriend, Linda Page, asks for his help in finding her uncle, Martin Warren, who was abducted by the ring after he was released from prison.

Dr. Tito Daka, the Japanese leader of the ring, plans to steal the city's radium supply to power his invention, a hand-held raygun that can dissolve anything hit by its powerful beam. He forces Warren to reveal the location of the vault where the radium is stored. Daka sends his American henchmen, along with a zombie that he controls by microphone via an electronic brain implant, to steal the precious metal. Batman discovers the plot and eventually routs the gang after a battle.

In his secret Bat's Cave, the Batman interrogates one of Daka's henchmen, who reveals the radium was to have been taken to The House of the Open Door, located in the mostly deserted "Little Tokyo" section of Gotham City. Batman and Robin infiltrate the gang's lair (also Dr. Daka's laboratory), hidden inside a still-open business, a Fun House ride. There, they find Linda bound, gagged, and unconscious. After she is rescued by the Dynamic Duo, Daka transforms her uncle Warren into a zombie and plots the derailment of a heavily laden supply train. Once again, Dr. Daka's sabotage efforts are stopped by Batman and Robin.

Traps and counter-traps follow in the succeeding chapters, as the Dynamic Duo continue to thwart the plans of the Japanese agent and his henchmen. Batman and Robin finally prevail, overseeing the capture of Daka's men and finally the death of the Japanese agent as he tries to escape.

== Chapter titles ==
Chapter	Title	Release #	Release date	Length (feet)	Running time
1	The Electrical Brain	5120	July 16, 1943	2423′	26.9 minutes
2	The Bat's Cave	5121	July 23, 1943	1606′	17.8 minutes
3	The Mark of the Zombies	5122	July 30, 1943	1638′	18.2 minutes
4	Slaves of the Rising Sun	5123	August 6, 1943	1664′	18.5 minutes
5	The Living Corpse	5124	August 13, 1943	1565′	17.4 minutes
6	Poison Peril	5125	August 20, 1943	1538′	17.1 minutes
7	The Phoney Doctor	5126	August 27, 1943	1467′	16.3 minutes
8	Lured by Radium	5127	September 3, 1943	1525′	16.9 minutes
9	The Sign of the Sphinx	5218	September 10, 1943	1500′	16.7 minutes
10	Flying Spies	5129	September 17, 1943	1618′	18 minutes
11	A Nipponese Trap	5130	September 24, 1943	1447′	16.1 minutes
12	Embers of Evil	5131	October 1, 1943	1333′	14.8 minutes
13	Eight Steps Down	5132	October 8, 1943	1322′	14.7 minutes
14	The Executioner Strikes	5133	October 15, 1943	1441′	16 minutes
15	The Doom of the Rising Sun	5134	October 22, 1943	1840′	20.4 minutes

_{Source:}

== Cast ==
- Lewis Wilson as Bruce Wayne / Batman
- Douglas Croft as Richard "Dick" Grayson / Robin
- J. Carrol Naish as Dr. Tito Daka/Prince Daka
- Shirley Patterson as Linda Page
- William Austin as Alfred (uncredited)
- Robert Fiske as Foster (uncredited)
- Gus Glassmire as Martin Warren (uncredited)
- Karl Hackett as Wallace (uncredited)
- Tom London as Andrews (uncredited)
- Charles Middleton as Ken Colton (Episodes #6-#8) (uncredited)
- Harry Tenbrook as Bartender (uncredited)
- Charles C. Wilson as Police Captain Arnold (uncredited)

== Production ==
The serial was made at the height of World War II and, like numerous works of popular American fiction of the time, contains anti-Axis powers sentiments and dialogue reflecting anti-Japanese sentiment. Early narration in the first chapter (at minute 9:20–9:30) references the U.S. government policy of Japanese American internment to explain the abandoned neighborhood where Daka's headquarters are located in Little Tokyo in Gotham.

Just like many other contemporary serials, Batman also suffered from a low budget. No attempt was made to create the Batmobile, so a black 1939 Cadillac Series 61 convertible was used, chauffeured by Alfred when Bruce Wayne and Dick Grayson were either in their civilian or Batman and Robin identities. It is driven "top-up" when it is the Batmobile, and "top-down" when it is Bruce Wayne's car. Batman's hometown of Gotham City, analogous to New York in the comics, becomes analogous to Los Angeles in the film.

While many serials made changes as part of their adaptation, Batman fared better than most, with only minor changes. In this serial, special utility belts were worn but never used, the villain was not taken from the comics' stories, there was no Batmobile, and Batman was a secret government agent instead of an independent, crime-fighting vigilante. This last change was due to the time period's film censors, who would not allow the hero to be seen taking the law into his own hands. Naish was originally cast as The Joker, but the character was changed to a Japanese supervillain that was suitable to the patriotic wartime plotline.

Several continuity errors occur, such as Batman losing his cape in a fight but wearing it again after the film only briefly cuts away. The opening narration in chapter 1 states that Wayne Manor is in the fictional Gotham City, but his mail in chapter 5 is addressed to Los Angeles. In the first chapter, Batman, when hearing the name of Dr. Daka, asks, "Who is that?" Then, in the last chapter, Batman tells Daka he and other enforcers have been looking for Daka since he killed two agents trying to deport him—an element never mentioned in any earlier chapter. In the transition between chapters 5 and 6, it is unclear how Batman survived the plane crash, which killed two villains who were on the plane with him.

Press releases announced Batman as a "Super Serial", and it was Columbia's largest-scale serial production to date. The studio gave it a publicity campaign equivalent to a feature film.

== Release ==
=== Theatrical releases ===
Batman was first released to theaters one chapter per week, beginning on July 16, 1943. Columbia re-released it to theaters in 1954 and 1962.

In 1964, film buff Hugh Hefner screened all 15 chapters of the serial at the Playboy Mansion. The trendy event received much notice in the press, prompting Columbia to offer the unedited serial to theaters in 1965 as An Evening with Batman and Robin in one long, marathon showing. This re-release was successful enough to inspire the development, by Lorenzo Semple Jr., under the auspices of producers William Dozier and Howie Horwitz, of the 1960s television series Batman. The series starred Adam West as Batman and Burt Ward as Robin, the Boy Wonder, and was produced as a lampoon, being driven by guest-star villains, flamboyant action, and tongue-in-cheek comedy.

=== Home media ===
DVD cover

A silent abridged version was released in 8 mm and Super 8 formats during the 1960s, with the complete serial edited into six chapters running 10 minutes each. Four three-minute reels with action scenes were also issued.

In the 1970s, the complete 15-chapter serial in its original unaltered format was released in a Super-8 Sound edition.

In the wake of the success of Tim Burton's Batman, the serial was released as a two-part VHS series in 1990 by GoodTimes Entertainment in a heavily modified form that dubbed over most of the original, racist dialogue. Dan Scapperotti of Cinefantastique commented that he was not surprised by those revisions as Columbia came at the time under the ownership of Japan's Sony corporation. Alterations made by Sony were limited to the soundtrack itself, and no frames or scenes were cut. Radio and TV announcer Gary Owens provided a new narration track, while additional lines of a racist nature were replaced by voice actors bearing little similarity to the original voices.

In October 2005, Sony Pictures Home Entertainment unveiled a two-disc DVD of the serial. This release restored the original, vintage-1943 dialogue but is missing the last minute of Chapter Two. The cliffhanger is intact, but the "teaser" for the next chapter is missing, as is the original end title. In the new video version, the cliffhanger fades out, followed by a silent Columbia logo.

In February 2014, Mill Creek Entertainment released Gotham City Serials, a two-disc DVD set with both the 1943 serial and the 1949 Batman and Robin serial.

=== Television ===
In 1989, the cable network The Comedy Channel aired the Batman serial uncut and uncensored. The cable network American Movie Classics did the same in the early 1990s on Saturday mornings. Turner Classic Movies began airing the serial every Saturday morning beginning in March 2015. Following the conclusion of the last episode, the channel continued the weekly slot with the 1949 Batman and Robin follow-up serial that, following an August hiatus, concluded in November the same year. In June 2021, Turner Classic Movies started airing Batman with one chapter every Saturday morning.

== Film elements ==
The first chapter of Batman no longer exists in pristine form. The original 35mm negative has either worn out from being consulted too often for reprints or has been lost to nitrate decomposition. For more than 50 years, Columbia has had to copy an older reference print of Chapter One, which shows a noticeable loss of detail and clarity. This was first discovered when Columbia included Chapter One of Batman in The Three Stooges Follies (1974), a theatrical release of old short subjects.

== Critical reception ==
Trade papers of 1943 sampled the first chapter for their reviews. The Exhibitor gave it a "good" rating: "This starts as if it will rate with the better serial entrants." Motion Picture Daily simply recapped the plot, adding, "This one is based on the Batman of the comic magazines. Its story and action are just as fantastic." Film Daily classed it as a juvenile adventure: "If this serial keeps up the pace set in the initial chapter, it should have no trouble satisfying the youngsters. The first chapter opens with a bang and never stops the fireworks until the fadeout. The action is utterly fantastic and can be taken seriously only by the young. The older fans are prone to laughing at the wrong time. Lambert Hillyer's direction is breathless."

Reappraisals since the Batman TV series have been less charitable to its serial predecessor. Author Raymond William Stedman described it in 1971 as an unintentional farce. Jim Harmon and Donald F. Glut describe Batman as "one of the most ludicrous serials ever made" despite its "forthright" simplicity.

The casting of Lewis Wilson as Batman and Douglas Croft as Robin has also been criticized. Some critics felt that the actors and their stunt doubles lacked the "style and grace" of their comic-book characters. Critics found Wilson's physique to be unathletic and "thick about the middle", and his voice was both too high-pitched and had a Boston accent. Croft was considered too old to play Robin and looked older still when doubled by a "hairy-legged" stuntman.

Also, the costumes were criticized as unconvincing in execution, and although the Batman costume was based on his original appearance, it drew special criticism for being too baggy and topped by a pair of "devil" horns.

Will Brooker remarked in the 2001 Batman Unmasked: Analyzing a Cultural Icon that, although he feels that the depiction of the Japanese characters is racist, Batman has little direct contact with them, but when Batman does, in fact, finally meet Daka in the final chapter, he immediately exclaims "Oh, a Jap!" He soon calls Daka "Jap murderer" and "Jap devil" and finally discusses a "Jap spy ring". Brooker surmises that these elements are likely to have been added as an afterthought to make the film more appealing to audiences of the time and that creating a nationalistic, patriotic film was not the filmmakers' original intent.

== Influence ==
An Evening with Batman and Robin was especially popular in college towns, where theaters were booked solid. Contemporary viewers found the extreme action scenes amusing, turning the film into an audience-participation show. Time Magazine commented:

Some oldsters come because "I saw one episode when I was 11 and wanted to know how it came out"; the majority are meeting the movie Batman for the first time. In either case, the reaction varies in pitch from light snickers to Neanderthal roars. Audiences giggle at veteran overactor J. Carroll Naish's portrait of Dr. Daka, boo the opening episode's racist slurs: "A wise government rounded up the shifty-eyed Japs." But by the time Batman lies trapped in a pit with knife blades converging on him, the audience stops laughing, starts chanting: "Kill! Kill! Kill!"... Wilson and Croft prompt more laughter than any other pair since Laurel and Hardy.

The success of this re-release led to the creation of the TV series Batman. The breathless opening and closing narration of each chapter in this and other Columbia serials (spoken by radio veteran Knox Manning) was, to some extent, the model that was parodied in the mid-1960s series.

The success of both the re-release and the subsequent TV series prompted the production of The Green Hornet. Originally a radio action crime drama series from 1936 to 1953, it was also the basis of two Universal Pictures movie serials in 1940. The 1966-67 TV show was played as a straight superhero action mystery series, and was also very popular with audiences, but lasted only one season, owing to significantly higher production costs. The failure of The Green Hornet led to the belief that similar revivals of serial properties were not possible in the television market of the time, and no further series were produced.

At DC Comics, Prince Daka appeared in All-Star Squadron #42-43 (February–March 1985) as the leader of several Japanese super-operatives. Since the #42-43 storyline occurred in 1942, it depicts Daka's activities before the events of the 1943 serial, as noted by writer Roy Thomas in a letter column.

From 2016 to 2019, Big John Creations produced a web series called Mystery of the Bat-Man as an homage to the original serial. Six chapters have been released under the guise of a "lost" serial from the late 1930s, complete with fictional backstory.

Daka also appeared in DC's Crimes of Passion #1.

Preceded by The Valley of Vanishing Men (1942)	Columbia serial Batman (1943)	Succeeded by The Phantom (1943)
