= Batman and Robin (serial) =

1949 film serial

- Directed by: Spencer Gordon Bennet
- Written by: George H. Plympton; Joseph F. Poland; Royal K. Cole
- Based on: Batman by: Bob Kane; Bill Finger; Robin by: Bob Kane; Bill Finger; Jerry Robinson
- Produced by: Sam Katzman
- Starring: Robert Lowery; Johnny Duncan; Jane Adams; Lyle Talbot; Ralph Graves; Don C. Harvey; William Fawcett; Leonard Penn
- Cinematography: Ira H. Morgan
- Edited by: Dwight Caldwell; Earl Turner
- Music by: Mischa Bakaleinikoff
- Color process: Black and white
- Distributed by: Columbia Pictures
- Release date: May 26, 1949 (United States)
- Running time: 15 chapters (17-26 mins) (total: 264 minutes)
- Country: United States
- Language: English

New Adventures of Batman and Robin, the Boy Wonder, also known as simply Batman and Robin, is a 15-chapter serial released in 1949 by Columbia Pictures. It is a sequel to the 1943 serial Batman, although with different actors. Robert Lowery plays Batman, while Johnny Duncan plays Robin. Supporting actors include Jane Adams as Vicki Vale and veteran character actor Lyle Talbot as Commissioner Gordon.

The serials were re-released as Video On Demand titles by RiffTrax, the alumni project of former Mystery Science Theater 3000 members Michael J. Nelson, Kevin Murphy, and Bill Corbett. As of September 2014, the entire serial has been released. Turner Classic Movies has broadcast the film serial from June to November 2015 and from October 2021 to January 2022 in a weekly half-hour slot on Saturday mornings.

== Plot ==
The dynamic duo faces off against the Wizard, a hooded villain with an electronic device that remotely controls vehicles and a compulsion to set challenges for Batman and Robin. The Wizard's identity remains a mystery to the Caped Crusaders until the end.

== Cast ==
- Robert Lowery as Bruce Wayne / Batman
- Johnny Duncan as Dick Grayson / Robin
- Jane Adams as Vicki Vale
- Lyle Talbot as Commissioner Jim Gordon
- Ralph Graves as Winslow Harrison
- Don C. Harvey as Nolan, a henchman
- William Fawcett as Professor Hammil
- Leonard Penn as Carter, Hammil's valet, and The Wizard, Carter's evil twin
- Rick Vallin as Barry Brown, a tabloid radio gossip
- Michael Whalen as Dunne, a private investigator
- Lee Roberts as Neal, a henchman (uncredited)
- Greg McClure as Evans, a henchman
- House Peters Jr. as Earl, a henchman
- Jim Diehl as Jason, a henchman
- Rusty Wescoatt as Ives, a henchman
- Eric Wilton as Alfred Pennyworth (uncredited)
- George Offerman Jr. as Jimmie Vale, Vicki's brother and henchman (uncredited)

== Production ==
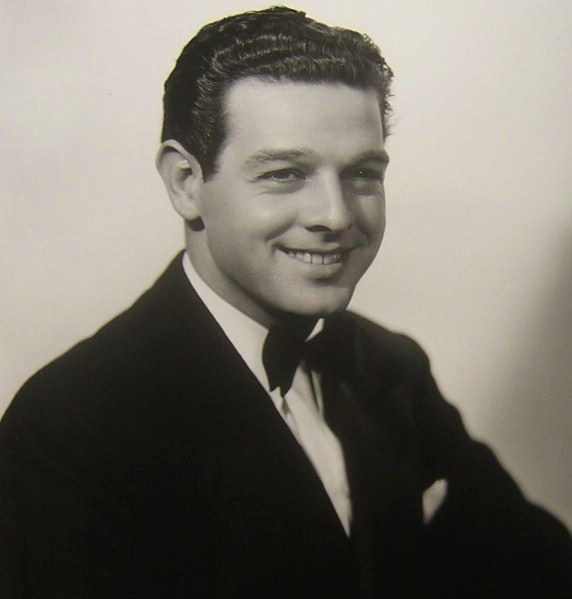
Robert Lowery

Batman and Robin is, according to historians Jim Harmon and Donald Glut, one of several Katzman productions that involved money-saving measures. The Batman costume had a poorly fitting cowl, and the Robin costume added pink tights to cover the "hairy legs" of both the actor and the stuntman. The Batmobile is again excluded, but instead of a limousine as in the first serial, the duo drive around in a 1949 Mercury.

Several mistakes and failures of logic occur in the serial. One example is that the film shows the Bat-Signal working in broad daylight. Another occurs when, even though the heroes' utility belts had been replaced by normal belts with no pockets or pouches for this serial, to escape from a vault, Batman pulls the nozzle and hose of an oxy-acetylene torch from his belt to cut through a steel door (the tanks for the torch are not shown); to compound this mistake, it is a full-sized oxy-acetylene torch that would have been impossible to carry unseen on his person. Harmon and Glut suggest that this was probably scripted to be a miniaturised 3-inch torch, as used in the comics, but the filmmakers improvised in following the directions for a "blowtorch".

== Release ==
DVD cover

In the wake of the success of Tim Burton's Batman in 1989, GoodTimes Entertainment released the serial on VHS, splitting the entire serial into two separate, budget-priced tapes recorded in LP mode. The GoodTimes edition was slightly edited, as well, with several minutes of the opening chapter mysteriously cut. In 1997, Columbia TriStar Home Video re-released the uncut serial (in SP mode) as a complete 2-tape VHS set. Sony Pictures Home Entertainment released the serial on DVD in 2005, timed to coincide with the theatrical release of Batman Begins. Unlike its predecessor, Batman and Robin: The Complete 1949 Movie Serial Collection has been given a restoration. In February 2014, Mill Creek Entertainment released Gotham City Serials, a two-disc DVD set that includes both the 1943 Batman serial and the 1949 Batman and Robin serial. RiffTrax released a Video On Demand of the first installment of the short on July 16, 2013, featuring a running mocking commentary from Michael J. Nelson, Kevin Murphy, and Bill Corbett of Mystery Science Theater 3000 fame. The final episode, "Batman Victorious", was released with commentary on September 19, 2014.

== Chapter titles ==
Chapter	Title	Release date
1	Batman Takes Over	May 26, 1949
2	Tunnel of Terror	June 2, 1949
3	Robin's Wild Ride	June 9, 1949
4	Batman Trapped	June 16, 1949
5	Robin Rescues Batman	June 23, 1949
6	Target - Robin!	June 30, 1949
7	The Fatal Blast	July 7, 1949
8	Robin Meets the Wizard	July 14, 1949
9	The Wizard Strikes Back	July 21, 1949
10	Batman's Last Chance	July 28, 1949
11	Robin's Ruse	August 4, 1949
12	Robin Rides the Wind	August 11, 1949
13	The Wizard's Challenge	August 18, 1949
14	Batman vs. Wizard	August 25, 1949
15	Batman Victorious	September 1, 1949

_{Source:}

== See also ==
- List of film serials
- List of film serials by studio
- List of films based on English-language comics

Preceded by Bruce Gentry (1949)	Columbia Serial; Batman and Robin (1949)	Succeeded by Adventures of Sir Galahad (1949)
