= List of The Batman (TV series) characters =

The following is a list of characters that have appeared in the television series The Batman, which ran from September 11, 2004, to March 22, 2008, as well as the show's tie-in comic called The Batman Strikes!. The animation style bears a strong resemblance to that of Jackie Chan Adventures, since Jeff Matsuda was the chief character designer for both shows. Many of the supervillains who appear in the series, like the Joker, Penguin and Riddler, are very different from their comic counterparts, and notable foes of Batman such as Two-Face, Scarecrow, Ra's al Ghul, and Mad Hatter are absent from the series altogether, though Scarecrow had early concept art made for him before he was barred from appearing, and Two-Face was planned to make an appearance in the tie-in comic book series, before it was cancelled by issue #50 in October 2008. Other characters that were planned to appear in the tie-in comic (but ultimately did not) were Wonder Woman, Bizarro, (who both had concept art made for them), Vigilante and Owlman.

== Main characters ==
- Batman / Bruce Wayne (voiced by Rino Romano) is a billionaire playboy and philanthropist who secretly operates as a vigilante. The character is based on the comic book character of the same name and follows the same premise and origin, in which his parents are murdered in front of him at a young age and swears vengeance on criminals. The show follows Batman early in his career. Batman goes on to join the Justice League in the fifth season.
- Robin / Dick Grayson (voiced by Eve Sabara (Note: Originally credited as Evan Sabara; Eve came out as a trans woman in 2020.)) is a 12-year-old former circus performer who Batman adopts after Tony Zucco murders his parents, the Flying Graysons. His origin in "A Matter of Family" follows Dick Grayson from the comic books with the exception of his being Batman's second sidekick after Batgirl. Dick appears as Nightwing in flashbacks depicted in the episode "Artifacts", voiced by Jerry O'Connell.
- Batgirl / Barbara Gordon (voiced by Danielle Judovits) is Jim Gordon's 16-year old daughter, who becomes a vigilante after being inspired by Batman. Her origin in the two-part "Batgirl Begins" deviates slightly from the comics in her acting as Batman's first sidekick prior to the introduction of Robin. "Artifacts" included sections set in the year 2027 with the character appearing as Oracle (voiced by Kellie Martin).
- Alfred Pennyworth (voiced by Alastair Duncan) is Batman's butler and surrogate father.

== Supporting characters ==
- The Gotham City Police Department is the police department who was at odds with Batman's vigilante work until Commissioner Gordon came into view.
  - Clayface / Ethan Bennett (voiced by Steve Harris) is a police detective and childhood friend of Batman. Bennett was created specifically for the series as one of three recurring police officers to interact with Batman. He is a supporter of Batman and is Bruce Wayne's high school friend within the Gotham City Police Department. At the end of the first season, Bennett is transformed into Clayface after being exposed to Joker Putty. Bennett remains Clayface until the fourth season episode "Clayfaces", where he is cured and restored to his human form. In a future depicted in the episode "Artifacts", Bennett is mentioned as having become Gotham City Chief of Police, replacing Angel Rojas.
  - Jim Gordon (voiced by Mitch Pileggi) is the commissioner of the Gotham City Police Department. He would later ally with Batman after he managed to apprehend Joker, Penguin, and Riddler.
  - Angel Rojas (voiced by Edward James Olmos in the first appearance, Jesse Corti in later appearances) was created specifically for the show as one of three recurring police officers to interact with Batman. He is the head of the precinct where Ellen Yin and Ethan Bennett work. He believes Batman is the worst aspect of the criminal element and makes capturing him a priority.
  - Ellen Yin (voiced by Ming-Na Wen) was created specifically for the show as one of three recurring police officers to interact with Batman, though her name and character arc are reminiscent of the character Ellen Yindel from The Dark Knight Returns. Yin is a new transfer to the Gotham City Police Department who does things by the book. She initially opposes Batman and aspires to capture and unmask him. Later in the series, Yin develops a grudging respect for Batman and eventually becomes his ally. In "Artifacts", Yin is mentioned as the future Police Commissioner of Gotham City, replacing a retired Jim Gordon.
  - Cash Tankinson (voiced by Patrick Warburton) is a police officer in the Gotham City Police Department. He was first seen when paired up with Ellen Yin as a brief replacement for Ethan Bennett. In his second appearance, Cash was assigned by Commissioner Gordon to protect Bruce Wayne from Cosmo Krank.
- Marion Grange (voiced by Adam West) is the mayor of Gotham City for the first four seasons of the series.
- Lucius Fox (voiced by Louis Gossett Jr.), based on the version from Christopher Nolan's Dark Knight Trilogy, is an employee at Wayne Enterprises, an old friend of Bruce Wayne's father, and knowing Bruce's secret identity as Batman. Though he only briefly appears at the end of season 4 and early in season 5, it is revealed he knows Bruce's secret identity and has been helping him behind the scenes for most of the series: having helped him design most of his arsenal, along with the construction of the Batcave.

== Antagonists ==
Various villains as depicted in the episode "Rumors". From left to right are: Riddler, Bane, Poison Ivy, a Riddleman, Black Mask, Man-Bat, Mister Freeze, Temblor, Spellbinder, Firefly, Ragdoll, Killer Croc, Joker, Harley Quinn (visible behind the Joker), Henchman, Penguin, Kabuki Twins, and Cluemaster.

- Bane (voiced by Joaquim de Almeida in "Traction", Ron Perlman in "Team Penguin", Clancy Brown in "The Batman/Superman Story") is a South American mercenary who derives superhuman strength from the Venom steroid.
- Black Mask (voiced by James Remar) is a meticulous and ruthless crime lord. He has no fingerprints or distinguishing features, making him difficult to identify. Black Mask is the head of a criminal organization which he runs through a second-in-command known as "Number One".
  - Number One is the name of several top henchmen who serve Black Mask. When a Number One disappoints Black Mask, he either demotes that person or disposes of them, followed by a random minion becoming the new Number One.
    - The first Number One (voiced by Diedrich Bader) is a silver-haired man who sports tactical goggles.
    - The second Number One is dressed as a basic Black Mask thug. This Number One's status was unknown.
    - The third Number One (voiced by John Mariano) has black hair and tactical goggles. After Number One disapproves of his plan, Black Mask disposes of him by exposing him to Nth Metal, causing him to fly away into the atmosphere.
    - The fourth Number One is an eyepatch-wearing woman.
  - The Black Mask Thugs are the basic minions of Black Mask.
- Catwoman / Selina Kyle (voiced by Gina Gershon) is a professional cat burglar and activist. Catwoman is the only recurring villain in the series who's never arrested and never unmasked by Batman, leaving it unlikely he even knows her true identity.
- Clayface / Basil Karlo (voiced by Wallace Langham in "Clayfaces", Lex Lang in "The Batman/Superman Story") is a failed actor who steals a sample of Joker Putty and gains superpowers. He operates as the second Clayface in a bid to gain attention.
- Cluemaster / Arthur Brown (voiced by Glenn Shadix as an adult, Kath Soucie as a child) is a former game show contestant who seeks revenge on those he believes rigged the show and cost him his title as champion. Though he became obese while living in his mother's basement, he built up the strength to support his body weight and is shown to make use of this strength when he fought Batman.
  - Cluemaster's Minions are the dwarfish servants of Cluemaster who wear full masks. They are implied to be members of Cluemaster's former baseball team.
- Captain Slash (voiced by Diedrich Bader) is a villain from an in-universe video game played by Robin and Marty Slack.
- Count Dracula (voiced by Peter Stormare) is based on the traditional character of the same name, adapted for The Batman vs. Dracula. Dracula's corpse was sent from Transylvania to Gotham City after he was staked. Penguin accidentally revives him when blood from a cut falls on Dracula's heart. He began feeding on the people of Gotham, turning them into his minions nicknamed the Lost Ones and allowing the Batman to be blamed. Posing as cultural anthropologist Dr. Alucard, Dracula attempts to seduce Vicky Vale to use her soul to revive his immolated bride Carmela Karnstein. However, Batman manages to find a cure for all of the Lost Ones, returning them to humans. Dracula is disintegrated after Batman lures him to a device that generates sunlight.
- Count Vertigo (voiced by Greg Ellis) is a former employee of Queen Industries who uses an eyepiece to induce vertigo.
- Everywhere Man / John Marlowe (voiced by Brandon Routh) was created specifically for the show. He is presented as an art collector and scientist specializing in quantum physics who is friends with Bruce Wayne. He creates a device called the Quantex which can duplicate matter, and uses it to duplicate himself. However, the duplicate has a slightly darker personality and eventually locks the original up, takes his place, and begins using other duplicates to commit theft.
- Firefly / Garfield Lynns / Phosphorus (voiced by Jason Marsden) is an arsonist who wields a bug-like suit. Late in the series, he steals a phosphorus isotope and is accidentally transformed into a metahuman with innate fire abilities.
  - Dr. Jane "Blaze" Blaisedale (voiced by Rachael MacFarlane) is a nuclear physicist who is fired after conducting unsafe experiments, later allying with Firefly.
- Gearhead / Nathaniel Finch (voiced by Will Friedle) is a criminal racer who can hack into vehicles using cybernetic implants in his arms and possesses retractable claws. The Batman Strikes! reveals him to be a former underground racing celebrity who was injured in an accident and rendered quadriplegic before an unknown doctor gave him cybernetic implants.
- Francis Grey (voiced by Dave Foley) is a clockmaker and thief who stole a pocket watch which led to his arrest after he bumped into a police officer and sent a hot dog cart into traffic causing a power outage, a four car pileup, and a tanker truck exploding. After being imprisoned for years, Grey develops the ability to rewind time for a specific amount of seconds and battles Batman. After his son was killed in a poison bomb that was meant to take out Gotham City, Grey rewinds time to the day he stole the pocket watch. He decides not to steal the watch, causing the timeline to change. In the present, he now runs a clock repair company with his son.
- The Joining is an extraterrestrial technology-based collective entity intent on absorbing Earth. They battle Batman in the fourth and fifth season finales, "The Joining" and "Lost Heroes", with "The Joining" seeing Batman form the Justice League to combat them.
- Joker (voiced by Kevin Michael Richardson) is Batman's maniacal nemesis, bent on causing chaos and making people laugh. While this version of Joker has green dreadlocks and is shown to be barefoot, he does wear spats-like coverings when he later wears his traditional suit. He wields various gadgets, but is equally skilled in combat, using his feet as dexterously as his hands to increase his mobility.
  - Harley Quinn / Harleen Quinzel (voiced by Hynden Walch) is initially a psychiatrist who works on a talk show. The Joker, being a fan of her show, decides to take Harley on a night on the town to help her get over being fired for trying to humiliate Bruce Wayne on television.
  - Punch and Judy (voiced by an uncredited Rino Romano when impersonated by Clayface) are the Joker's henchmen.
  - Prank / Donnie (voiced by Michael Reisz) is a classmate of Barbara Gordon who the Joker temporarily recruits as his sidekick. Donnie joins the Joker in an attempt to become funnier, but quickly regrets it after Joker tried to push him into a chemical vat, leading to Batman and Batgirl rescuing him.
  - Marty Slack (voiced by Patton Oswalt) is a technician and gamer who works for Joker.
  - Joker 2.0 (voiced by Kevin Michael Richardson) is a copy of Joker's mind who gained a digital clone body following an accident with a special helmet that Marty Slack invented. The character appears in the episode "The Metal Face of Comedy".
- Hideo Katsu (voiced by Keone Young) is the head of a Yakuza crime syndicate.
  - The Dragon's Fangs are a group of ninjas who Katsu summoned to deal with Catwoman.
- Killer Croc (voiced by Ron Perlman) is a crocodile-like criminal and crime boss. He rarely works on his own, tending to work with other villains.
  - Vic (voiced by Jim Cummings), Freddy (voiced by Jim Cummings), and unnamed man are three robbers who were recruited by Killer Croc to serve him.
- Killer Moth (voiced by Jeff Bennett) is a low-tier member of Team Penguin. He later transforms into a monstrous moth-like creature after being exposed to radiation. Killer Moth remains loyal to Penguin, using his new appearance to intimidate the other villains into obeying.
- Cosmo Krank (voiced by Patton Oswalt) is a toymaker who produces dangerous toys and seeks revenge on Bruce Wayne for shutting down his company. Krank also appears in Gotham, portrayed by Chris Perfetti, where he is depicted as the son of Griffin Krank. Shops bearing his name appear in the Batman: Arkham series.
- Lex Luthor (voiced by Clancy Brown) is a businessman and enemy of Superman. The character is based on the comic book character of the same name and is presented as a business magnate with immense wealth. Luthor attempts to gain control over Superman using spores from Poison Ivy laced with kryptonite.
  - Mercy Graves (voiced by Gwendoline Yeo) is Lex Luthor's bodyguard.
- Dr. Kirk Langstrom / Man-Bat (voiced by Peter MacNicol) is a scientist who created a serum that mutates him into a giant bat-like creature. Langstrom remains in Arkham until he finally gets over the obsession of wanting to be feared like Batman. He is later called upon by Batman to make an antidote to his serum, which college students were using to get revenge on bullies.
- Metallo (voiced by Lex Lang) is a Kryptonite-powered cyborg and enemy of Superman.
- Dr. Sam Scudder / Mirror Master (voiced by John Larroquette) is a mirror-themed villain and enemy of the Flash.
  - Smoke (voiced by Amanda Anka) is the Mirror Master's henchwoman.
- Victor Fries / Mister Freeze (voiced by Clancy Brown) is a professional diamond thief who was trapped in a cryonic freezer during a prior encounter with Batman. Instead of being killed, the accident drastically lowers his body temperature and grants him the ability to freeze things through touch. In a possible future depicted in the episode "Artifacts", Freeze's body deteriorates and he begins using mechanical spider-like legs.
- Oswald Cobblepot / The Penguin (voiced by Tom Kenny) is an aristocratic member of the Cobblepot family who turned to crime to rebuild his family's reputation and wealth.
  - The Kabuki Twins are Penguin's silent Asian henchwomen.
- Pamela Isley / Poison Ivy (voiced by Piera Coppola) is introduced as a school friend of Barbara Gordon and a passionate eco-rights activist. When her plan to use the freelance criminal Temblor goes bad, Isley is exposed to a plant-based compound. This gives her the ability to produce mind-controlling spores and to rapidly grow and control plants.
- Rag Doll (voiced by Jeff Bennett) is a thief and contortionist who can bend his body to great lengths. He is triple-jointed, allowing him easy access to areas too difficult to move in by normal people; he can even hide in Penguin's hat.
- Edward Nygma / Riddler (voiced by Robert Englund) is a university scientist who worked on methods to enhance human memory. When his breakthrough prototype is sabotaged on its demonstration for investors, Nygma is fired from the university and seeks revenge on the person he believes is responsible for the sabotage.
  - The Riddlemen are the Riddler's henchmen.
- Mario / Rumor (voiced by Ron Perlman) is a vigilante who seeks to kill all of Gotham's villains. He is an original character created for the series and was intended as a stand-in for Hush, who could not be used in the series.
- Shadow Thief (voiced by Diedrich Bader) is a thief who can transform into shadows and an enemy of Hawkman.
- Sinestro (voiced by Miguel Ferrer) is a Yellow Lantern with fear-based abilities and an enemy of the Green Lantern Corps.
- Solomon Grundy (voiced by Kevin Grevioux) is a swamp zombie residing in Slaughter Swamp and the subject of an urban legend stating that he was created to get revenge on Gotham's founders for polluting the environment. Ethan Bennett impersonates Grundy in the episode "Grundy's Night" while the real Grundy appears in The Batman Strikes!.
- Spellbinder (voiced by Michael Massee) is a mystic with a third eye that allows him to create illusions and control the minds of others.
- Hugo Strange (voiced initially by Frank Gorshin and subsequently by Richard Green following Gorshin's death) is the head psychiatrist of Arkham Asylum. He is more interested in discovering how the criminal mind works than helping to cure the inmates. After encountering the Joining, Strange asks them to give him ultimate knowledge, which leaves him catatonic.
  - D.A.V.E. (voiced by Jeff Bennett) is a robot created by Hugo Strange and programmed with the personalities and knowledge of several of Batman's adversaries.
- Temblor (voiced by Jim Cummings) is a mercenary who wields armored gauntlets that emit sonic blasts.
- The Terrible Trio are university students who use variants of Kirk Langstrom's formula to transform into animal-like forms and terrorize their classmates. They consist of David / Fox (voiced by David Faustino), Justin / Shark (voiced by Googy Gress), and Amber / Vulture (voiced by Grey DeLisle).
- Rupert Thorne (voiced by Victor Brandt) is an aging crime boss who Batman defeats at the beginning of the series. Thorne later appears in The Batman Strikes!, where he forms an army of enhanced criminals based on Bane, Man-Bat, Firefly, Gearhead, and Temblor.
- Toyman (voiced by Richard Green) is an evil toymaker and enemy of Superman.
- Arnold Wesker / Ventriloquist and Scarface (both voiced by Dan Castellaneta) is a former ventriloquist who snapped and became a criminal after being booed off stage.
  - Rhino and Mugsy (both voiced by John DiMaggio) are the Ventriloquist's henchmen.
- William Mallory / Wrath (voiced by Christopher Gorham) is the older son of a pair of jewel thieves who were arrested and jailed around the same time Bruce Wayne's parents were killed. He and his younger brother Andy / Scorn become criminals to help other criminals, believing that they have a right to profit as much as heroes and civilians.
  - Andy Mallory / Scorn (voiced by Daryl Sabara) is the younger brother and sidekick of William Mallory / Wrath.
- Maxie Zeus (voiced by Phil LaMarr) is an eccentric billionaire and former mayoral candidate who is obsessed with Greek mythology and culture.
- Tony Zucco (voiced by Mark Hamill) is a crime boss and former circus performer who killed the Flying Graysons after threatening their circus for protection money and one of his brothers being apprehended by Batman during the confrontation. He used to be part of a knife throwing act with his father, who he accidentally killed during a performance.
  - Bruiser (voiced by Maurice LaMarche) is the strongman brother of Tony Zucco. He was apprehended by Batman sometime after the Flying Graysons' murder.
  - "Juggler" is the juggling brother of Tony Zucco. He was apprehended by Batman sometime after the Flying Graysons' murder.
  - "Lion Tamer" is the whip-wielding brother of Tony Zucco. It is Batman's apprehension of this brother of Tony Zucco that led to Tony Zucco sabotaging the Flying Graysons' trapeze act.

== Justice League ==
The Justice League is a superhero group that was formed following the invasion of the Joining.

- The Flash (voiced by Charlie Schlatter) is a superhero from Central City who possesses superhuman speed. His identity is not stated in the series, but producer Alan Burnett states him to be the Barry Allen incarnation of the character.
- Oliver Queen / Green Arrow (voiced by Chris Hardwick) is a master archer and vigilante from Star City.
- Hal Jordan / Green Lantern (voiced by Dermot Mulroney) is a member of the Green Lantern Corps, an intergalactic police force. He can fly and generate energy constructs using his ring.
- Hawkman (voiced by Robert Patrick) is a Thanagarian police officer who wields an Nth Metal mace. Like with Flash, his real name, Katar Hol, is never mentioned in the series.
- Martian Manhunter / Detective John Jones (voiced by Dorian Harewood) is a Martian superhero with various abilities, namely telepathy and shapeshifting. He invites Batman into the Justice League after defeating the Joining.
- Clark Kent / Superman (voiced by George Newbern) is an alien superhero from the planet Krypton who is based in Metropolis. In a reversal from their usual portrayals, Superman was more of a loner, standoffish and was the one who was reluctant to join the Justice League with Batman being the more friendly one.

== Other characters ==
- Bruno Mannheim is a crime boss, the leader or Intergang and an enemy of Superman. He exclusively appears in The Batman Strikes! #44, in which he works with Rupert Thorne and Dr. Lopez to create an army of super-villains and turns himself into a second version of Metallo only to be defeated by Batman and Superman.
- Cat Grant, Ron Troupe and Steve Lombard, are employees of the Daily Planet who exclusively appear in a brief cameo The Batman Strikes! #44. They appear with Lois Lane, Perry White, Bruce Wayne and Clark Kent for a photograph taken outside the Daily Planet by Jimmy Olsen.
- Clea (voiced by Allison Mack) is a museum curator who is John Marlowe's love interest. After the clone of John Marlowe was defeated, Marlowe donated his art to Clea's museum as he begins a love relationship with her.
- The Demons Three are a trio of demons and former enemies of Etrigan. They exclusively appear in The Batman Strikes!.
- Etrigan is a demon who is bound to the human Jason Blood, through which he is influenced to do good. He exclusively appears in The Batman Strikes!.
- Hamilton Hill (voiced by Lex Lang) briefly appears in the two-part episode "The Batman/Superman Story", as the new mayor of Gotham City after Marion Grange's apparent resignation. Unlike his comics counterpart, this version is African-American and does not appear to be corrupt. He would make one further cameo appearance in The Batman Strikes! #47.
- Harvey Bullock and Renee Montoya make a brief cameo The Batman Strikes! #47, where they were seen in the briefing room listening to Commissioner Gordon during one of Black Mask's crime spree. Bullock and Montoya's designs are based on their DC Animated Universe counterparts.
- Hotwire / Yvette Brawner is a new young electrokinetic heroine from Gotham City, an original character created for the series, who only appears in The Batman Strikes! #42. Hoping to prove herself a hero, she investigates a rumor about a shade deal by Rupert Thorne, not realizing Batman and Robin are there as well. After defeating Thorne's thugs, Hotwire accidentally sets off a fuel storage and causes a large explosion. Batman berates her for ruining his own investigation, before Thorne's hired muscle, Bane, reveals himself. After Robin is taken out, Hotwire charges Bane with her powers, impressing Batman. Still considering her a liability due to her inexperience, he sends her to Martian Manhunter for further training.
- Jimmy Olsen (voiced by Jack DeSena) is a young employee at the Daily Planet and a friend of Superman.
- Lois Lane (voiced by Dana Delany) is a reporter for the Daily Planet and a friend of Superman.
- Dr. Lopez is a South-American scientist working deep in the Amazon. He only appears in The Batman Strikes! #12, where it was revealed he was responsible for the creation of the villain Bane. Lopez allies with Rupert Thorne, who uses his research to create an army of supervillains.
- Martha Wayne (voiced by Kath Soucie) is the mother of Batman.
- Perry White is the editor-in-chief of the Daily Planet. Though Lois is heard speaking to him on the phone, he remains unseen and exclusively appears in The Batman Strikes! #44.
- Dr. Thomas Wayne (voiced by Jeff Bennett) is the father of Batman.
- Vicki Vale (voiced by Tara Strong) is a television reporter whom Dracula attempts to use to resurrect his bride Carmilla.
