= Batman Live =

2011 touring stage show

- Original language: English
- Characters: Batman; Robin; Alfred Pennyworth; Commissioner Gordon; Joker; Harley Quinn; Catwoman; Penguin; Riddler; Poison Ivy; Two-Face; Scarecrow

Premiere
- Date: 19 July 2011; Manchester Evening News Arena
- Place: Britain

Batman Live is a touring stage show, including theatrical, circus and stage-magic elements, that focuses on the DC Comics superhero Batman. It debuted on July 19, 2011 at the Manchester Evening News Arena, with two and a half years in the making at a reported cost of about £7.5 million.

== History ==
Producer Nick Grace conceived the idea of "Batman Live" following his successful animatronic project of Walking With Dinosaurs − The Arena Spectacular. The story was written by Stan Berkowitz, Alan Burnett, and Allan Heinberg.

The show began its tour in the UK in Manchester in summer 2011. The British Isles part of the tour includes venues in England, Scotland, Northern Ireland and the Republic of Ireland. It then launched in North America in Summer 2012, and ceased touring in December 2012 in Dallas, Texas. In September 2012, "Batman Live" began touring America, starting in Anaheim, California at the Honda Center.

== Cast and crew ==
The production was mounted by acclaimed professionals, and was co-directed by James Powell, who has worked on Les Miserables and Dirty Dancing. The crew included Anthony Van Laast, widely known for his work on Mamma Mia!, as the creative director, and renowned car designer Prof.Gordon Murray, who crafted the Batmobile especially for the show, as well as composer James Seymour Brett, who created and arranged the music, Es Devlin as the production designer, Luke Halls and Sam Pattinson as the video designers and Patrick Woodroffe as the lighting designer. The crew also included Jack Galloway as costume designer, Jake Berry as technical director and Simon Baker as sound designer. The circus sequences were created and managed by Bryan Donaldson and Juliette Hardy-Donaldson.

The Cast included Nick Court and Sam Heughan as Batman/Bruce Wayne, Emma Clifford as Catwoman and Martha Wayne, Kamran Darabi-Ford and Michael Pickering as Robin/Dick Grayson, Mark Frost as the Joker, Alex Giannini as Commissioner Gordon and The Penguin, John Conroy as Alfred Pennyworth, Poppy Tierney as Harley Quinn and Mary Grayson, Christopher Price as John Grayson, Joe Chill and The Riddler, Garry Lake as Ringmaster and Two-Face (also portrayed by Christopher D Hunt), Jack Walker as Tony Zucco, Darrell Brockis as Dr. Thomas Wayne, Valerie Murzak as Poison Ivy, Benos Noble and Ian Henderson as The Scarecrow and Erin Anna Jameson as young Bruce Wayne.

The rest of the cast included: Marina Abdeen, Michelle Antrobus, Alice Capitani, Darryl Carrington, Sam Cater, Danny Chase, Beth Coleman, Stephan Dermendjiev, Sammy Dinneen, Liam Durbidge, Jono Fee, Ben Habgood, Maria Hippolyte, Jack Jefferson, Lee Matthews, Gemma Michael, Tamzen Molding, Valérie Murzak, Danuta Ramos, Kate Sanderson, Jessica Sherman, Antony Somers, Océane Sunniva, George Turvey, Mike Zwahlen.

== Plot summary ==
The plot concerns the origin of Robin and of the Batman and Robin team. It begins with the murder of Bruce Wayne's parents in the past and then shows how in the present day he has become the masked vigilante, Batman, as a result. After the circus acrobat parents of Dick Grayson are murdered by Tony Zucco during a performance in Gotham City, the orphan is put into the care of Bruce Wayne and his faithful butler Alfred by Commissioner Gordon. As the various villains of Gotham team up to defeat their nemesis, Wayne reveals his identity to Grayson and eventually teaches him properly to channel his anger—to seek justice, not revenge. The new pairing is sorely tested when the Joker reveals his master plan to release the inmates of Arkham Asylum into Gotham, and to use Grayson as bait in a final deadly trap for Batman. With the Riddler, the Penguin, Poison Ivy, Two-Face, the Scarecrow, Harley Quinn and even Batman's potential love, the thief Catwoman, all ranged against them as well, the new 'Dynamic Duo' faces the ultimate showdown.
