= List of The Batman episodes =

The following is an episode list for the Kids' WB and Cartoon Network animated television series The Batman, starring the titular character. The series premiered on September 11, 2004, and ended on March 8, 2008, with a total of 65 episodes being produced and aired over the series' three-and-a-half-year run; each season comprised 13 episodes.

All five seasons are available on DVD. A direct-to-DVD film titled The Batman vs. Dracula, based on the series, was released in on October 18, 2005, and made its television debut on Cartoon Network's Toonami block on October 22, 2005. There is also a spin-off comic book series, The Batman Strikes!, published by DC Comics which is set in the same continuity and style of The Batman.

== Series overview ==
Season	Episodes	Originally released		
Season	Episodes	First released	Last released	Network
1	13	September 11, 2004	May 7, 2005	Cartoon Network/Kids' WB
2	13	May 14, 2005	September 10, 2005	Cartoon Network/Kids' WB
Movie		October 18, 2005		Cartoon Network
3	13	September 17, 2005	May 13, 2006	Kids' WB
4	13	September 23, 2006	May 5, 2007	Kids' WB
5	13	September 22, 2007	March 8, 2008	Kids' WB

== Episodes ==
=== Season 1 (2004–05) ===
No. overall	No. in season	Title	Villain(s)	Directed by	Written by	Original release date	Prod. code	K9–14 viewers (in millions)	K6–11 rating/share
1	1	"The Bat in the Belfry"	Joker & Rupert Thorne	Seung Eun Kim	Duane Capizzi	September 11, 2004	257–421	0.97	3.7/15 (Note: This episode also received: a 7.0/31 share with male tweens 9–14; a 4.0/17 share among all tweens aged 9–14; "The Batman outperformed the broadcast competition to rank #1 in its time slot among kids 2-11, kids 6-11, boys 2-11, boys 6-11, tweens 9-14 and male tweens 9-14, Kids WB says. The new series was also Kids WB's best ever 10:30am debut among tweens 9-14 and male tweens 9-14. The series tied with Pokémon Advanced Challenge to rank as the #2 overall program among male tweens 9-14 (7.0/31) and tied with Xiaolin Showdown to rank #6 among tweens 9-14 (4.0/17).")
Masked vigilante The Batman, alias billionaire industrialist Bruce Wayne, is publicly acknowledged as a menace by Chief of Police, Angel Rojas despite his work to combat crime over the past three years, who assigns Detective Ethan Bennett and his new partner Ellen Yin to capture him. At the same time, a break-out of inmates at Arkham Asylum leads Batman to discovering that the culprit is a crazed clown criminal calling himself The Joker, who has a gas that cause victims to be left paralyzed and have a fixed, yellow-toothed smile. Batman quickly discovers that The Joker plans to use the gas on Gotham City and attempts to stop him, with Yin and Bennett eager to do the same.
2	2	"Call of the Cobblepot"	Penguin & Kabuki Twins	Brandon Vietti	Steven Melching	September 18, 2004	257–423	1.03	3.5/15
A spate of thefts involving vultures, owls and crows that steal jewels, leaves Batman determined to discover who the culprit is. At the same time, Bruce finds his latest party at Wayne Manor gatecrashed by slobbish socialite Oswald Cobblepot, whose family Alfred Pennyworth's grandfather worked for. Bruce soon realizes Oswald, going under the name the Penguin, is responsible for the thefts, and soon has to stop him when Alfred is captured by him when trying to get back a serving tray he stole.
3	3	"Traction"	Bane & Mob Bosses #1–#3	Sam Liu	Adam Beechen	September 25, 2004	257–422	0.86	2.3
Seeking revenge on Batman for ruining their criminal operations, three mob bosses meet together and hire a mysterious villain named Bane to finish him off, once and for all. Batman quickly discovers that Bane is no ordinary criminal, as he can gain superhuman strength through a special serum called venom that can be pumped into his body by a unique infusion system. Badly injured when confronting him, Bruce is forced to find a means to put a stop to Bane as he begins to terrorise the city.
4	4	"The Cat and the Bat"	Catwoman & Hideto Katsu	Sam Liu	Adam Beechen	October 2, 2004	257–426	0.92	3.7
Batman encounters a new foe in the form of a skilled thief Selina Kyle, who operates under the alias of Catwoman. After thwarting her attempt to steal a figurine from its mysterious owner, Batman loses his utility belt to her in the process. Not only does he face problems when she messes with it, he also discovers she might use some of his gadgets to make a second attempt on the figurine. He also fears Catwoman has underestimated who its owner really is.
5	5	"The Man Who Would Be Bat"	Man-Bat	Seung Eun Kim	Thomas Pugsley & Greg Klein	October 30, 2004	257–424	N/A	N/A
At Wayne Industries, Bruce becomes suspicious when Dr. Kirk Langstrom's work draws the attention of Yin and Bennett to Wayne Industries while pursuing his alter ego. Although Langstrom claims he is working on a cure for deafness, Bruce soon discovers him to actually working on a mutagenic serum that can allow him to transform into a giant beast dubbed "Man-Bat". Batman soon must put a stop to him, when he learns he must feed on blood and may soon attack humans for sustenance.
6	6	"The Big Chill"	Mister Freeze	Brandon Vietti	Greg Weisman	November 6, 2004	257–425	N/A	N/A
Batman investigates a recent jewellery robbery from a yacht in Gotham Bay, and discover it to the work of a villain called Mr. Freeze, who use cryogenic powers. To his horror, Batman discovers he was once an ordinary thief named Victor Fries - an individual he had thought dead after pursuing him for the theft of diamonds, until a sequence of events caused him to crash into a cryogenics lab, where he later suffered a freak accident that mutated his body and made him dependent on a cryogenic suit to survive. Knowing he must stop him, Batman is forced to find a way to combat his new powers and confront his actions.
7	7	"The Big Heat"	Firefly	Seung Eun Kim	Christopher Yost & J.D. Murray	November 13, 2004	257–427	N/A	N/A
Bruce is concerned when Marion Grange, the mayor of Gotham City, informs him that a contract for work on the children's hospital may be awarded to GothCorp, a company with a rather dubious reputation, rather than Wayne Industries, despite the charity work of Bruce's late father. At the same time, Batman confronts a new villain, the jet-pack and fire-armed Firefly, while investigating a number of break-ins at tech firms around the city. When his effort to sway the city council fails, Bruce becomes suspicious of GothCorp's bid, and soon finds a connection between them, Firefly and the break-ins.
8	8	"Q&A"	Cluemaster	Brandon Vietti	Steven Melching	November 20, 2004	257–428	N/A	N/A
Batman investigates this sudden abduction of two people named Ross Daren and Herbert Ziegler from separate public events that occurred within during same day, shortly after each victim was publicly humiliated. He soon realizes that this culprit is Arthur Brown, an overweight manchild and former whiz kid who appeared on a children's quiz show called Think, Thank, Thunk, which both victims were hosting. Learning that Brown is now calling himself "Cluemaster" and abducting a Russian-born woman named Yelena Klimanov, Arthur's erstwhile opponent who beat him on this game show when both she and Arthur were children, Batman finds himself in a race against time to save his victims before Brown can execute all three of his victims as an act of revenge.
9	9	"The Big Dummy"	Ventriloquist, Scarface, Rhino and Mugsy	Sam Liu	Robert Goodman	November 27, 2004	257–429	N/A	N/A
Alfred attempts to coax Bruce into engaging in some online dating, hoping he may find solace with a loving companion, but the Batman is required to investigate a spate of robberies being conducted by Arnold Wesker, a ventriloquist with a spilt personality that leads the worst to come out through his ventriloquist dummy Scarface. While Bruce attempts to engage in Alfred's efforts, he is left to question if he can, especially when he learns Wesker's robberies are the basis for a much bigger heist.
10	10	"Topsy Turvy"	Joker	Seung Eun Kim	Adam Beechen	February 5, 2005	257–430	N/A	3.3/13
Bennett and Yin are shocked to find Joker has escaped Arkham Asylum and seeking to kidnap everyone who brought him down, intending each of his victims to be encased and paralyzed in large playing-card styled boxes. Batman investigates, but soon discovers Joker involved an accomplice to his schemes, prompting him to confront the real criminal. Joker soon proves to be far more devious, not only escaping for real, but leaving Batman in a race against time to save his intended victims from a tragic fate.
11	11	"Bird of Prey"	Penguin and Kabuki Twins	Brandon Vietti	Steven Melching	February 12, 2005	257–431	N/A	N/A
Bruce is reluctant to take part in a television documentary focused upon his lifestyle, owing to his work as Batman. The matter becomes complicated when Penguin breaks into the mansion, intending to steal everything. When he discovers what is going on, he soon takes everyone hostage and ensure the documentary is about himself. With a delicate situation on his hands, Bruce must not only stop Penguin, but must also ensure neither he nor the film crew learn his secret identity.
12	12	"The Rubber Face of Comedy"	Joker, Punch and Judy	Sam Liu	Greg Weisman	April 30, 2005	257–432	N/A	N/A
13	13	"The Clayface of Tragedy"	Clayface	Seung Eun Kim	Greg Weisman	May 7, 2005	257–433	N/A	N/A
Joker returns to Gotham with two new henchman, Punch and Judy, and a new chemical creation that can be sprayed onto anything, turning it into putty. At the same time, Bruce questions whether he should reveal his secret identity of Batman to Bennett, as his friend and Yin are tasked with stopping Joker and Batman under a new zero-tolerance policy of Chief Rojas. Bennett soon gets himself captured and subjected to psychological torture by Joker, prompting Batman to rescue him. While his efforts to rescue the detective lead Yin to question her orders, Bennett is suspended from duty for questioning, only to learn his troubles are set to worsen. Bennett is horrified when he begins to suddenly mutate into a putty-like monster in his own home, not only able to comprehend what is happening, but being perceived as a monster that the media dubs as "Clayface". As he tries to adapt to his situation, he slowly pushes away Bruce and Yin, who begin to get suspicious. When Bennett goes after Rojas, blaming him for his transformation, Batman deduces that he was exposed to Joker's chemical spray, which mutated his cells, and that his torture at their hands has badly damaged his sanity. As he works to prevent the situation worsening, Yin slowly begins to learn just how important he is to Gotham's protection.

=== Season 2 (2005) ===
No. overall	No. in season	Title	Villain(s)	Directed by	Written by	Original release date	Prod. code	K6–11 rating/share
14	1	"The Cat, the Bat, and the Very Ugly"	Penguin, Kabuki Twins, & Catwoman	Brandon Vietti	Thomas Pugsley & Greg Klein	May 14, 2005	257–434	N/A
Catwoman finds herself entering a partnership with Penguin, when both discover they are after the same thing - a pair of valuable Egyptian relics. When Batman attempts to stop their scheme, Penguin double-crosses Catwoman, and binds her to their common foe. Forced to work together, Batman and Catwoman discover the relics, when combined, can form a beam of light into a powerful weapon. Discovering Penguin intends to do just that with Gotham's abandoned lighthouse, the pair must stop him before he can hold the city for ransom with the weapon.
15	2	"Riddled"	Riddler & Riddlemen	Sam Liu	Christopher Yost & J.D. Murray	May 21, 2005	257–435	N/A
The GCPD find themselves dealing with a new threat in the form of Riddler, who has planted a bomb at Gotham's city hall. Yin secretly works with Batman to defuse the device, only for the pair to be forced to defuse other explosives around the city. But as they make progress, Batman begins to realize Riddler has a far greater scheme, leading him and Yin to retrace their steps when they discover that their foe intends to use Gotham's information network for his own purposes.
16	3	"Fire & Ice"	Mister Freeze & Firefly	Sam Liu	Joseph Kuhr	May 28, 2005	257–441	N/A
Batman finds himself investigating a series of thefts during a cold winter in Gotham, discovering that Firefly and Mr. Freeze are working together to steal components from various companies around the city. At the same time, Bruce must attend the GCPD's annual gala charity ball despite his investigations, but matters soon change when Firefly and Freeze use a cryogenic weapon to take control of Gotham's heating system, using it to freeze the gala while he is attending it. As the only one able to escape, Bruce is forced to assume his role as Batman to stop the pair, before the rest of the city is targeted.
17	4	"The Laughing Bat"	Joker & Penguin	Seung Eun Kim	Michael Jelenic	June 4, 2005	257–445	N/A
Gotham's citizens become nervous when Joker suddenly decides to become the "Batman", going after anyone for their crimes no matter how trivial it is, and charging the city for his services. Batman, seeking to stop this, finds himself attacked by Joker, who injects him with Joker venom. Bruce, who begins to transform into a new Joker, finds he must recover Joker's venom to create an antidote, though the matter becomes complicated when Penguin commits a bank heist that draws in Joker's attention, leading to a threeway bout between them and Batman.
18	5	"Swamped"	Killer Croc	Brandon Vietti	Thomas Pugsley & Greg Klein	June 11, 2005	257–437	N/A
A group of jewel thieves find themselves being made to work for a new criminal in Gotham called Killer Croc - a large, anthropomorphic crocodile-man, who has big plans for the city. Batman soon investigates when the group begin stealing several items for a large scheme, and soon discovers that they have taken control of the city's water pumps to flood the wealthy districts, force citizens and the police out to plunder them. To prevent further robberies, Batman find he must stop Croc, and prevent him flooding the city any further.
19	6	"Pets"	Penguin and Man-Bat	Sam Liu	J.D. Murray & Christopher Yost	June 18, 2005	257–438	N/A
Penguin takes interest in a new sonic device that can control birds hoping to use it on a large, rare condor to commit crimes. But Batman's interference causes his trained birds to lose the device and steal another that controls bats. Penguin is shocked when he uses the devices and attracts Man-Bat to his hideout, but swiftly sees an opportunity. Batman finds himself seeking to end the situation, but the matter is not made easy when a raccoon gets into the Bat-Cave and damages equipment, forcing Alfred to stop it to ensure his master can succeed.
20	7	"Meltdown"	Joker, Hugo Strange & Clayface	Seung Eun Kim	Greg Weisman	June 25, 2005	257–439	N/A
Bennett is captured by Batman when he attempts to get revenge on Joker, though his actions allow his target to escape from Arkham Asylum. At his trial, both Bruce and Yin testify on his behalf, alongside Arkham's new psychiatric expert Dr. Hugo Strange, allowing Bennett to be released on probation and receive a job at Wayne Industries. His efforts to lead a normal life are not made easy when Joker launches a crime spree and he attempts to stop it. Bruce soon worries for his friend, and his fear soon come true when Bennett's lack of control leads him on a path to crime.
21	8	"JTV"	Joker, Punch and Judy	Seung Eun Kim	Michael Jelenic	July 9, 2005	257–436	N/A
Joker sets up a pirate TV channel, dubbed "JTV", and announces his attentions over Gotham's airwaves to kidnap Mayor Grange. Batman soon pursues after him when he succeeds, concerned of what he is plotting after using Joker gas on him, while Yin struggles with her new overzealous partner Cash Tankinson, who attracts Joker's attention. When Cash is soon kidnapped and subjected to the same treatment, Batman attempts to rescue both victims after tracing Joker's broadcasts, but soon learns that the clown criminal is plotting something far worse for Gotham with his broadcasts.
22	9	"Ragdolls to Riches"	Catwoman and Rag Doll	Seung Eun Kim	Adam Beechen	July 16, 2005	257–442	N/A
Batman discovers that both he and Catwoman have a new problem in the form of Ragdoll, a triple-jointed contortionist who seeks to steal priceless artifacts. While not as their alter egos, Selina Kyle opts to befriend Bruce Wayne, though their evening together is short-lived when Ragdoll turns up again. Eager to beat him, Batman decides to lay a trap to lure both him and Catwoman, with the bait being some priceless gems a gangster hid in one of the Wayne family's properties - a clock tower.
23	10	"The Butler Did It"	Spellbinder	Brandon Vietti	Alexx Van Dyne	August 20, 2005	257–440	N/A
Alfred finds that a dream he had was all too real when he and Bruce discover that he stole a Ming vase from the mansion. Seeking to find out more, Bruce discovers that Alfred and the butlers of some billionaires he works with were hypnotized by Spellbinder, a three-eyed mystic with the ability not only to hypnotise but also induce visions. It becomes clear that Spellbinder has his eyes set on the valuable Eye of Sarkana, but Alfred quickly discovers that it will not be stolen by the butlers, but by their masters, which presents problems for Bruce's alter ego.
24	11	"Grundy's Night"	Solomon Grundy & Clayface	Sam Liu	Adam Beechen	August 27, 2005	257–444	N/A
It's Halloween night, yet there are real scares in store when Solomon Grundy, a zombie legend of Gotham, comes to life and begins going after the descendants of those who founded the city, robbing them and destroying everything they own. As Batman and Alfred try to stop him, it soon becomes clear that Grundy is not all that he appears to be.
25	12	"Strange Minds"	Joker & Hugo Strange	Brandon Vietti	Greg Weisman	September 3, 2005	257–443	N/A
Yin finds herself a hostage to Joker, who refuses to give up her location when captured, claiming she will go out with a big "pop" unless he is released. Seeking to find out where she is, Dr. Hugo Strange opts to use a device created by Wayne Enterprises to find the answers, but Batman believes he stands a better chance, and uses the prototype of the device to enter Joker's mind. But he soon finds it a dangerous place to be in, and that he could go mad if he is not careful.
26	13	"Night and the City"	Joker, Riddler, Penguin, Punch and Judy, Kabuki Twins	Brandon Vietti	Steven Melching	September 10, 2005	257–446	1.6
As a way to settle a dispute over who will claim Gotham, Joker, Penguin and Riddler have a contest to see who can capture Batman and discover his true identity. While Batman prepares to stop all three, his ally in the police force is compromised when Rojas discovers that Yin has been helping him. Soon she and Batman find themselves trying to stay ahead of the police while apprehending the three criminals, though help may be on hand in the form of Police Commissioner James Gordon, who believes that only Batman can stop Joker, Penguin and Riddler from bringing mayhem on Gotham's streets. As a result of their heroics, Yin is reinstated to the GCPD, and Batman's charges are dropped, as the police accept his work.

=== Season 3 (2005–06) ===
No. overall	No. in season	Title	Villain(s)	Directed by	Written by	Original release date	Prod. code	K6–11 rating/share
27	1	"Batgirl Begins"	Temblor and Poison Ivy	Brandon Vietti	Michael Jelenic	September 17, 2005	345–301	2.4
28	2	"Batgirl Begins"	Poison Ivy	Christopher Berkeley	Michael Jelenic and Adam Beechen	September 24, 2005	345–302	2.3
Barbara Gordon recounts the story of how she became Batgirl. In the first part, Barbara recalls how she and her friend, Pamela Isley, led protests against corporations for environmental damage they caused, much to her father's displeasure. Unbeknown to her or Batman, Pamela is the brains behind a string of attacks against these corporations with a powerful new super-villain named Temblor. She soon gets more than she bargains for when Temblor begins wondering why he has not been paid for his work as promised, placing her and Barbara in extreme danger. Continuing her story, Barbara recalls how Pamela's chemical accident during the fight between Temblor and Batman, caused her body to mutate and give her power over plants and spores that can mind-control men. Becoming Poison Ivy, she soon continues her attacks against waste-dumping corporations, but when she kidnaps Commissioner Gordon and places Batman under her control, Barbara, inspired by the caped crusader, becomes her own hero in the form of Batgirl, the only one capable of turning things around.
29	3	"A Dark Knight to Remember"	Penguin & Kabuki Twins	Brandon Vietti	Joseph Kuhr	October 1, 2005	345–304	2.3
Bruce Wayne suffers amnesia when fighting against Penguin, forgetting his role as Batman, and leaving him able to continue his crime spree. Barbara, who suspects he is Batman but later believes she is mistaken, tries to stop Penguin but is soon captured. With Batgirl in trouble, Alfred decides it's essential for Bruce to relearn his role as Batman if she is to stand any chance of rescue.
30	4	"A Fistful of Felt"	Ventriloquist, Scarface, Joker, Penguin, Hugo Strange, Rhino and Mugsy	Anthony Chun	Steven Melching	October 8, 2005	345–303	2.5
After he is captured once again, Arnold Wesker is released from Arkham when Dr. Hugo Strange "cures" him by removing Scarface from him, allowing the former criminal to use his ventriloquism to start a new career as a children's entertainer. Batman is initially suspicious of this, but gives Arnold the benefit of the doubt, unaware that Strange plans to reunite him with his former puppet, which soon brings trouble.
31	5	"RPM"	Gearhead	Christopher Berkeley	Christopher Yost	November 5, 2005	345–305	2.0
While partaking in a charity race, Bruce witnesses Gearhead, a villain who can take over anything mechanical and transform it with nanomachines into a powerfully fast vehicle, to steal the race's prize. Both Batman and Batgirl attempt to stop him, but when Gearhead destroys the Batmobile, Bruce decides to build a better one that can bring down the villain.
32	6	"Brawn"	Joker	Brandon Vietti	Alexx Van Dyne	November 12, 2005	345–307	2.4
Batman and Batgirl find themselves dealing with new trouble from Joker, when he manages to get a hold of Bane's Venom Infusion system to become a true comedy "powerhouse". With his new-found strength, Joker's latest crime spree seems unstoppable, especially when Batgirl accidentally causes Batman to be captured when she borrows his power suit. To rescue him, Batgirl discovers that she must overcome her own limitations to master control of the suit as well as stop Joker.
33	7	"The Laughing Cats"	Catwoman, Joker, Punch and Judy	Christopher Berkeley	Joseph Kuhr	November 19, 2005	345–308	N/A
Catwoman seems to be the suspect in the theft of a rare Black Siberian Leopard, but it soon turns out that Joker is behind the theft when Batman and Batgirl investigate and attempt to protect a second leopard of the same breed, unaware that Catwoman is interested in the matter. When all three discover that the cats were stolen for Killgore Steed, the owner of several dangerous creatures, no one anticipates Joker double-crossing him and using his personal maze and creatures to put an end to Batman, Batgirl and Catwoman.
34	8	"Fleurs du Mal"	Poison Ivy and Penguin	Anthony Chun	David Slack	November 26, 2005	345–309	1.5/9
When Gotham's police and government officials, including Mayor Grange and Commissioner Gordon, enact strange, new laws, Barbara discovers that the cause is a mysterious plant that they all received. Batman and Batgirl soon discover that Poison Ivy is responsible and that she has replaced the officials with plant-based copies, leading the pair to stop her and her clones, while finding where the real officials have been taken to.
35	9	"Cash for Toys"	Toymaker	Anthony Chun	Steven Melching	February 4, 2006	345–306	2.1/9
Cosmo Krank seemed to be an ingenious toymaker, but all of his creations were dangerous for kids to use, leading to Bruce and Wayne Industries shutting his company down. Bruce soon finds himself as the target of the toymaker, who seeks revenge by killing him with newer, diabolical versions of his toys. Knowing that Batman must bring him down, things are not so easy when Commissioner Gordon assigns Detective Cash to be Bruce's bodyguard until the demented villain is arrested, forcing Bruce to find a way to ditch Cash to become the Batman and stop Cosmo.
36	10	"The Apprentice"	Joker, Prank, Punch and Judy	Brandon Vietti	Steven Melching	February 11, 2006	345–310	2.1/8
Upset that Batman and his new sidekick, Batgirl, are ruining his plans, Joker decides that he needs a partner of his own. He soon finds the right person in Donnie, a misguided prankster who attends classes at the same high school as Barbara. When she realises that Donnie is Joker's new sidekick called Prank, she and Batman find themselves trying to convince him that Joker is not a good role model to have.
37	11	"Thunder"	Maxie Zeus	Christopher Berkeley	Paul Giacoppo	February 18, 2006	345–311	1.9/8
No one could have anticipated that Maximillian Zeus, a technology entrepreneur, billionaire, and Greek and Roman history fanatic, would seek to take control of Gotham, but it does when he looks set to lose to Mayor Grange during a mayoral election. Using a giant aircraft called New Olympus that is equipped with a powerful weapon and crewed by his personal security force of "Gladiators", he soon threatens the city leaving Batman to stop him. But he soon discovers that Batgirl is far more resourceful, as she finally proves that she deserves to be his sidekick.
38	12	"The Icy Depths"	Mister Freeze and Penguin	Anthony Chun	Steven Melching	May 6, 2006	345–312	1.6/7
Alfred is surprised when an old school friend of his turns up in Gotham and invites his friend on a treasure hunt. Although weary of his friend, Alfred agrees, unaware that the treasure being sought out for, is the target of both Penguin and Mr. Freeze. Batman is forced to join the hunt, and soon deduces that the treasure lies beneath Gotham Bay.
39	13	"Gotham's Ultimate Criminal Mastermind"	D.A.V.E. and Hugo Strange	Brandon Vietti	Alexx Van Dyne	May 13, 2006	345–313	1.8/8
A new villain emerges in the form of D.A.V.E. (Digitally Advanced Villain Emulator), an AI database created by Hugo Strange that is encoded with the minds of Gotham's greatest criminals and breaks free to commit crimes. Batman finds himself trying to stop D.A.V.E., when the AI proclaims itself as the ultimate criminal and plans to reveal to Gotham the true identity of Batman, unaware that things are not what they seem to be.

=== Season 4 (2006–07) ===
No. overall	No. in season	Title	Villain(s)	Directed by	Written by	Original release date	Prod. code	K6–11 rating/share
40	1	"A Matter of Family"	Tony Zucco	Brandon Vietti	Michael Jelenic	September 23, 2006	040	2.2/10
After a young circus performer named Richard Grayson loses his parents to a criminal named Tony Zucco, Bruce adopts the boy, since he knows what it feels like to lose his family. Batman then sets out to bring Mr. and Mrs. Grayson's killer to justice. Once Bruce's secret is revealed, Richard joins Batman as his new sidekick, Robin.
41	2	"Team Penguin"	Killer Moth,	Anthony Chun	Joseph Kuhr	September 30, 2006	041	1.8/9
After watching a film about criminal masterminds, Penguin forms Team Penguin along with Killer Croc, Ragdoll, Firefly and newcomer Killer Moth to finally take Batman down. Meanwhile, Batgirl and Robin must learn how to work together. Moth gets infected by a chemical which the team stole and mutates into a giant, monstrous moth.
42	3	"Clayfaces"	Joker, Clayface, Basil Karlo, Punch and Judy	Matt Youngberg	Steven Melching	October 7, 2006	042	1.9/8
After Ethan Bennett foils one of Joker's plans, he plans to prove himself to Batman by turning a new leaf. Meanwhile, has-been actor Basil Karlo steals the mutagen responsible for mutating Bennett and becomes the new Clayface. Batman is unsure if he can trust Ethan enough to let him help stop Karlo.
43	4	"The Everywhere Man"	Everywhere Man	Brandon Vietti	Greg Weisman	November 4, 2006	043	1.9/9
When evidence from a series of art thefts by the Everywhere Man, a new costumed villain with the power to replicate, implicates Bruce's close friend John Marlowe, Batman believes there must be another explanation. Now, Batman must unmask the identity of the "Everywhere Man" and prove his friend's innocence.
44	5	"The Breakout"	Black Mask and Number One	Matt Youngberg	Alexx Van Dyne	November 11, 2006	045	1.2/5
After Batman apprehends Black Mask, his henchmen plan to spring him from Gotham P.D. so that Black Mask can activate his doomsday device. When Batman is captured, Batgirl and Robin must stop the villain and save the city on their own.
45	6	"Strange New World"	Hugo Strange	Anthony Chun	Joseph Kuhr	November 18, 2006	044	1.8/8
Hugo Strange infects the population of Gotham with a virus that transforms them into zombies, and only Batman and Robin are left to find and distribute the antidote.
46	7	"Artifacts"	Mister Freeze	Brandon Vietti	Greg Weisman	February 3, 2007	046	N/A
A thousand years into the possible future, the citizens of new Gotham must uncover the history of Batman to stop a new-and-improved Mr. Freeze.
47	8	"Seconds"	Francis Grey	Matt Youngberg	Steven Melching	February 10, 2007	048	1.6/6
The Bat Team goes up against an unstoppable thief who knows their every move.
48	9	"Riddler's Revenge"	Riddler and Riddlemen	Brandon Vietti	Stan Berkowitz	February 17, 2007	049	1.8/7
Riddler and Batman are in a crate, dropped at the bottom of Gotham Harbor. Riddler reveals his origins.
49	10	"Two of a Kind"	Joker, Harley Quinn, Punch and Judy	Anthony Chun	Paul Dini	February 24, 2007	047	1.6/7
When pop psychology TV host Harleen Quinzel is canceled from her television program for ambushing Bruce Wayne and for her bad advice, Joker takes an interest and decides to turn her into his partner in crime, Harley Quinn.
50	11	"Rumors"	Rumor, Joker, Penguin, Bane, Catwoman, Killer Croc, Riddler, Man-Bat, Firefly, and many more.	Matt Youngberg	Joseph Kuhr	March 3, 2007	050	1.4/6
The villains of Gotham are disappearing, each one defeated and captured by an invisible vigilante named Rumor. Batman and Robin must defeat Rumor before he has a chance to execute all the villains.
51	12	"The Joining"	The Joining	Anthony Chun	Douglas Petrie and Jane Espenson	April 28, 2007	051	1.7/8
52	13	"The Joining"	The Joining, Joker (Cameo), Mr.Freeze (Cameo), Penguin (Cameo), Bane (Cameo)	Brandon Vietti & Vinton Heuck	Douglas Petrie and Jane Espenson	May 5, 2007	052	1.3/7
Bruce discovers that Wayne Industries is distributing alien technology across the world and gains the aid of a mysterious ally, who warns him of an alien race threatening to conquer Earth. Meanwhile, Batman begins to wonder whether he would be better off without Batgirl and Robin. The Joining has launched its attack on Earth and the key to defeating them is Wayne Industries' satellites. As Batman and Martian Manhunter attempt to penetrate Wayne Towers, Alfred encourages Batgirl and Robin to disobey Batman while the battle for Earth begins.

=== Season 5 (2007–08) ===
No. overall	No. in season	Title	Villain(s)	Directed by	Written by	Original release date	Prod. code	K6–11 rating/share
53	1	"The Batman / Superman Story"	Lex Luthor, Mercy Graves, Metallo, Clayface, Poison Ivy, Bane, Mr. Freeze, Black Mask & Number One	Vinton Heuck	Alan Burnett	September 22, 2007	501	1.5/8
54	2	"The Batman / Superman Story"	Lex Luthor, Mercy Graves, Poison Ivy & Clayface	Christopher Berkeley	Steve Cuden	September 29, 2007	502	1.3/7
Batman and Superman find themselves teamed up when Lex Luthor begins operations in Gotham to take down Superman, and employs a horde of Batman's villains to do so. Lex later on gets a hold of Poison Ivy's mind control gas, laces it with Kryptonite, and now becomes able to control Superman's mind. Batman and Robin must battle Superman, who is now under the mind control of Lex Luthor, as the villain plans to launch a wave of Lex Corps' robots and take over all of the world's armies.
55	3	"Vertigo"	Count Vertigo	John Fang	Stan Berkowitz	October 6, 2007	503	1.3/6
Batman welcomes another member of the Justice League to Gotham as he teams up with Green Arrow when Count Vertigo, a villain who can affect people's sense of balance, arrives in the city with a diabolical plan.
56	4	"White Heat"	Firefly / Phosphorus & Blaze	Vinton Heuck	Joseph Kuhr	October 13, 2007	504	1.8/8
Firefly tries to upgrade his powers with the aid of his new girlfriend Blaze, but is exposed to radioactive phosphorus and takes on a more dangerous identity as Phosphorus. The Bat Team must stop him from using a nuclear power plant to blow up Gotham.
57	5	"A Mirror Darkly"	Mirror Master & Smoke	Christopher Berkeley	Steven Melching	November 3, 2007	505	1.2/6
Batman and Robin team up with Flash to thwart Mirror Master's plans to trap everyone in their own mirror image.
58	6	"Joker Express"	Joker, Punch and Judy	John Fang	Brian Swenlin	November 10, 2007	506	0.7/3
Gotham citizens are bursting into hysterical laughter and dumping their stolen goods into the river, putting Batman, Robin and Batgirl onto the trail of The Joker, who is using a steam train to commit his new crime wave.
59	7	"Ring Toss"	Sinestro & Penguin	Christopher Berkeley	Len Uhley	December 8, 2007	507	1.2/5
Green Lantern seeks Batman's help in locating renegade Green Lantern Sinestro, but when the villain comes to Earth, Penguin ends up with the hero's power ring.
60	8	"The Metal Face of Comedy"	Joker, Joker 2.0, Harley Quinn, Marty, Punch and Judy	Vinton Heuck	Alexx Van Dyne	December 15, 2007	508	1.1/6
With the help of a hacker, Joker's mind is downloaded into a computer, enabling him to control the new WayneTech Nanobots. This creates a new and improved body who attempts to destroy Batman, Robin, and the original Joker.
61	9	"Attack of the Terrible Trio"	The Terrible Trio	John Fang	Stan Berkowitz	February 2, 2008	509	1.1/5
A trio of college misfits use stolen mutagens from Kirk Langstrom to mutate themselves into human-animal forms and get revenge on those who have scorned them.
62	10	"The End of the Batman"	Ventriloquist, Scarface, Joker, Harley Quinn, Penguin, Killer Croc, Wrath & Scorn	Vinton Heuck	Robert Goodman	February 9, 2008	510	N/A
Wrath and Scorn, the Dynamic Duo's evil counterparts, are helping Joker, Penguin, Killer Croc, and Ventriloquist and Scarface with a job and Batman and Robin must stop their evil counterparts.
63	11	"What Goes Up..."	Shadow Thief, Black Mask & Number One	Christopher Berkeley	Alexx Van Dyne	February 16, 2008	511	0.7/3
When Black Mask hires Hawkman's foe the Shadow Thief to break him out of Arkham and assist in the theft of a meteorite, Batman must team up with Hawkman to defeat the villains.
64	12	"Lost Heroes"	Toyman, Hugo Strange, Mirror Master & The Joining	John Fang & Vinton Heuck	Stan Berkowitz and Alexx Van Dyne	March 8, 2008	512	1.7/7
65	13	"Lost Heroes"	Hugo Strange & The Joining	John Fang & Vinton Heuck	Stan Berkowitz and Alexx Van Dyne	March 8, 2008	513	1.7/7
The super-powered members of the Justice League begin disappearing one by one. Only Batman, Robin, and Green Arrow are left to investigate and discover that their old enemies and The Joining are involved. The heroes fight their android counterparts to recover the Justice League's powers, while Hugo Strange prepares for The Joinings' final assault on Earth.

=== Film (2005) ===
The 2005 direct-to-video feature film The Batman vs. Dracula was released after four episodes of the third season had aired. An intended sequel based on Batman: Hush was in pre-production before the project was cancelled. The film was released to DVD on October 18, 2005, and made its television debut on Cartoon Network's Toonami block on October 22. It was released on DVD as a tie-in with the live-action Batman Begins.

Title	Villain(s)	Directed by	Written by	Original release date
The Batman vs. Dracula	Dracula, Penguin & Joker	Michael Goguen	Duane Capizzi	October 18, 2005
Gotham is terrorized not only by Joker and Penguin, but by the original creature of the night, Dracula. Batman must stop the ruthless vampire before he turns everyone in the city into his mindless minions.
