= List of Batman episodes =

List of Batman episodes may refer to:

- List of Batman (TV series) episodes
- List of Batman: The Animated Series episodes
- List of The Batman episodes
