= Batman Confidential =

US comic book series

- Cover to Batman Confidential #1, art by Whilce Portacio and Richard Friend.

Publication information
- Publisher: DC Comics
- Schedule: Monthly
- Format: Ongoing series
- Publication date: December 2006 - March 2011
- No. of issues: 54
- Main character: Batman

Creative team
- Written by: Andy Diggle
- Penciller(s): Whilce Portacio, Rags Morales, Kevin Maguire, José Luis García-López, Jerry Bingham
- Inker: Kevin Nowlan

Batman Confidential is an American monthly comic book series from DC Comics which debuted on December 6, 2006 and concluded on March 2, 2011.

Like a previous Batman series, Batman: Legends of the Dark Knight, Batman Confidential featured stories by rotating creative teams set in the early years of modern Batman's career, post-Batman: Year One, and illustrated formative moments in the character's past, such as first encounters with allies and foes.

== Story arcs ==
=== Rules of Engagement (#1-6) ===
The first story arc by Andy Diggle and Whilce Portacio features Batman, roughly a year after he started fighting crime, in his first encounter with Superman's nemesis Lex Luthor. A long-distance laser sniper rifle is used to kill a murderer Batman is questioning.

Batman begins investigating the type of weapon, and discovers the only thing that his company had created as far as energy weapons go could not be simply carried by one man. The next day, Bruce Wayne and Lex Luthor are competing for a military contract concerning a stealth interceptor robot and the O.G.R.E. disaster rescue robot. The robot tries to kill Lex Luthor, who successfully escapes into the sewers. The machine flies away.

At Wayne Enterprises Captain Jim Gordon investigates the O.G.R.E. pilot chamber and the pilot, who had died of a heart attack. Bruce Wayne is under suspicion. It is learned the pilot died before the Luthor attack. Batman devises a new way to bring down the robot; after figuring out the dead pilot's mind had been lost inside its machinery, Batman vows to restore the pilot back to life if possible.

=== Lovers and Madmen (#7-12) ===
Written by Michael Green with art by Denys Cowan.

One year after Batman began his war on the Gotham underworld, crime is down and people feel safe for the first time in years. Bruce Wayne enters into a relationship with Lorna Shore. Later, he investigates a triple murder and is frustrated to find no motive. Meanwhile, a man in a bar named Jack tells the waitress, Leeny, that he is so good at his job that it no longer excites him. She tells him that he owes it to himself to use his gifts to the fullest, inspiring him to try again. Days later, Jack – a career criminal – robs a bank, but once again finds himself bored. He triggers the security alarm to make the job more challenging. During a firefight with police, Batman arrives. Jack observes Batman's behavior and appearance, thinking "He looks ridiculous" and smiles.

Jack leaves a note thanking Batman for making his day. Over the next few weeks, Jack commits random crimes to draw out Batman, and observes from a distance Batman's frustration with being unable to capture him. Batman learns from Maletesta, a rising mob boss, that he is not the only person searching for Jack. As Bruce Wayne, he continues to develop a relationship with Lorna. He unhappily finds an excuse to skip a ball she is hosting at a museum to use his newly built computer to calculate Jack's next crime, only to find her ball will be the target.

When Batman arrives and interrupts the theft, Jack takes Lorna as a hostage. Jack draws a knife and slashes Lorna across her midsection before attempting to flee. In a fit of rage, Batman flings a batarang at Jack. It cuts him on both sides of his jaw, giving Jack a Glasgow smile. Batman takes Lorna to the hospital, where she is in critical condition.

Later, inspecting his facial wounds, Jack muses, "It's nice to feel something". Back at the Batcave, Bruce postulates that Jack will seek medical attention and begins to search for underground surgeons. He receives a call from the hospital, telling him Lorna will most likely not survive her wounds. Batman calls Maletesta, informing him of Jack's location and telling him to do as he wishes. Jack is taken to an abandoned chemical plant by Maletsta's men. They beat him, but he manages to escape and fight them before falling into an empty chemical vat. Batman realizes he has made a mistake, and he races to stop Jack's murder.

Jack is disappointed to still have survived his fall. A goon tries to shoot Jack, but the bullet hits a massive container of anti-psychotics above them, flooding the vat. Batman arrives, but believes Jack is dead. Believing he is about to die, Jack wishes he could see Batman one last time. He happens to see a drainpipe, leading him to a lake outside the factory. Jack emerges from the water with white skin, red lips and green hair and his brown suit dyed purple. He begins to laugh at the joke that the world is playing on him, and becomes hysterical as he notices a "bunny in the moon".

Batman learns Lorna is alive but still not responsive. Jack – now calling himself "the Joker" – begins terrorizing Gotham, but instead of stopping him, Batman chooses to stay by Lorna's side. Alfred convinces Bruce to confront the Joker, at which point the Joker tests Batman's commitment to saving people by leaping off a building. After a brief hesitation, Batman saves the Joker's life. Lorna recovers, but Bruce decides he cannot have a relationship with her. After ending the relationship, he makes a financial donation to help complete Arkham Asylum, where the Joker is imprisoned.

Important events: the origin of the Joker; the creation of the Batcomputer; the first meeting between the future Joker and the future Harley Quinn. This story however contradicts Batman: The Killing Joke and Batman: The Man Who Laughs, both of which are considered canon in the mainstream continuity.

=== Wrath Child (#13-16) ===
Written by Tony Bedard with art by Rags Morales.

Batman investigates a string of murders, where all the victims are policemen attending an annual law enforcement convention in Gotham. He suspects that the Wrath, who he thought was dead, has returned after five years, and that he is continuing his vendetta against law enforcement and Commissioner Gordon. Batman goes to the Wrath's lover, Grayle Hudson, in order to ask her about the villain's return. He and Nightwing later find out from her and from Gordon's secret police files that it was the Wrath's sidekick, Elliot Caldwell, who has donned his mentor's costume and is behind the killings.

Batman and Nightwing later rescue Hudson from Caldwell, and foil his assassination attempt on Gordon. The new Wrath is overwhelmed by the amount of teamwork and trust the heroes have, not having the same partnership with his cruel mentor, and is defeated and sent to Blackgate Penitentiary.

=== The Cat and the Bat (#17-21) ===
Written by Fabian Nicieza with art by Kevin Maguire.

The first encounter between Batgirl and Catwoman.

=== Do You Understand These Rights? (#22-25) ===
Written by Andrew Kreisberg with art by Scott McDaniel.

The first time Batman puts the Joker in jail, but that does not stop him from continuing his killing spree while in custody.

=== A New Dawn (#26-28) ===
Written by Nunzio DeFilippis and Christina Weir with art by José Luis García-López and Kevin Nowlan.

Batman investigates a string of murders involving museum executives. Since mysterious riddles are being left behind as clues, suspicion naturally falls upon the Riddler. However, the perpetrator this time is not the Riddler, but King Tut, a character created for the late 60s Batman TV series, making his first appearance in comic book continuity.

=== Bad Cop (#29-30) ===
Written by Andrew Kreisberg with art by Scott McDaniel.

A sequel to Do You Understand These Rights?. The police officer that the Joker had tortured goes insane and terrorizes Gotham City.

=== The Bat and the Beast (#31-35) ===
Written by Peter Milligan with art by Andy Clarke.

Batman travels to Russia to battle a mobster with sights on Gotham City. He runs afoul of the mobster's protector, the vicious, bear-like "Beast".

=== Blackhawk Down (#36-39) ===
Written by Royal McGraw with art by Marcos Marz.

Bruce Wayne is financing a Blackhawk flight technology when the prototype is attacked after a strange storm. He then discover that the culprit is Theodore Gainor, a rogue member of the Blackhawks who has somehow remained young through World War II and now is planning a full scale aerial assault on the United States. With the help of the original Lady Blackhawk, Batman tries to infiltrate Blackhawk Island. Batman calls upon Janos Prohaska, the leader of the Blackhawks, who had faked his death. The villain is defeated.

=== Ghosts (#40-43) ===
Written and drawn by Sam Kieth.

When a strangely supernatural creature begins to kill in Gotham, Batman tries to fight something that he even cannot touch, especially after the monster says he knows about his parents' deaths. It is revealed that the monster is somehow created by the sadness of people who have been killed by guns and is targeting people who have survived it. Batman realizes a link with a blind woman that lost her sight in a similar event but, even after defeating the creature, he is unable to save the woman's life.

=== Batman vs. the Undead (#44-48) ===
Written by Kevin Vanhook with art by Tom Mandrake.

A sequel to Superman and Batman vs. Vampires and Werewolves. Professor Herbert Combs is early released from Arkham Asylum, which prompts Batman to follow him into a museum. This leads the Caped Crusader again to cross paths with Marius Dimeter, as the duo fight an undead army summoned by Combs. It is revealed that the professor seeks the help of a voodoo witch in order to learn how to control death. With help from Superman and Doctor Fate, their plans are thwarted and Combs is again arrested.

=== Work That's Never Done (#49) ===
Written by James Patrick with art by Steve Scott.

=== Super Powers (#50-54) ===
Written by Marc Guggenheim with art by Jerry Bingham.

While chasing a mutant and supposedly alien villain, Batman infiltrates the Watchtower to get information. There, he meets the Justice League and he reminisces about the first meeting he had with a super-powered team before becoming a hero.

== Legacy ==
The deathcore band Lorna Shore was named after the character Lorna Shore.

== Collected editions ==
This series has been collected as follows:

Title	Material collected	ISBN
Batman: Rules of Engagement	Batman: Confidential #1-6	Hardcover: ISBN 978-1-4012-1481-4 Paperback: ISBN 978-1-4012-1706-8
Batman: Lovers and Madmen	Batman: Confidential #7-12	Hardcover: ISBN 978-1-4012-1683-2 Paperback: ISBN 978-1-4012-1742-6
Batman: The Wrath	Batman: Confidential #13-16; Batman Special #1 (1984)	Paperback: ISBN 978-1-4012-2514-8
Batman: The Cat and the Bat	Batman: Confidential #17-21	Paperback: ISBN 978-1-4012-2496-7
Batman: Dead to Rights	Batman: Confidential #22-25, 29-30 "Do You Understand These Rights?" and "Bad Cop"	Paperback: ISBN 978-1-4012-2925-2
Batman: King Tut's Tomb	Batman: Confidential #26-28, The Brave and the Bold #164 and 171 and Batman #353	Paperback: ISBN 978-1-4012-2577-3
Batman: The Bat and the Beast	Batman: Confidential #31-35	Paperback: ISBN 978-1-4012-2794-4
Batman: Ghosts	Batman: Confidential #40-43 and Batman/Lobo: Deadly Serious #1-2	Paperback: ISBN 978-1-4012-7863-2
Batman vs. the Undead	Batman: Confidential #44-48	Paperback: ISBN 978-1-4012-3035-7
Batman: Super Powers	Batman: Confidential #50-54	Paperback: ISBN 978-1-4012-7772-7

== See also ==
- List of Batman comics
- Superman Confidential
- More info
