= Flying Graysons =

Group of characters in DC Comics

- The Flying Graysons, as they appeared in Robin (vol. 2) Annual #4 (April 1995), art by Jason Armstrong.

Publication information
- Publisher: DC Comics
- First appearance: Detective Comics #38 (April 1940)
- Created by: Bill Finger; Bob Kane

In-story information
- Member(s): Dick Grayson; John Grayson; Mary Grayson

The Flying Graysons are fictional characters appearing in American comic books published by DC Comics. They are a family of trapeze artists, whose child Dick is adopted by Bruce Wayne (Batman) and becomes Robin after their deaths.

The Flying Graysons have been featured in several media adaptions outside of comics, commonly as part of Robin's origin story.

== Fictional team history ==
The Flying Graysons are a group of trapeze artists—father John, mother Mary, and son Dick Grayson—famed for performing without a safety net. They work at Haly's Circus, owned by Jack Haly. After Haly rebuffs crime boss Tony Zucco's attempt to exact protection money, Zucco sabotages John and Mary's trapeze. The two fall to their deaths in front of the audience, which includes Bruce Wayne.

Bruce adopts Dick, then reveals his identity as the superhero Batman. Dick becomes Batman's sidekick Robin. Batman and Robin avenge Dick's parents by bringing Zucco to justice.

During the Blackest Night storyline, John and Mary Grayson are resurrected as members of the Black Lantern Corps and attack Dick, Tim Drake, and Damian Wayne. In Nightwing (vol. 4), it was revealed that, before marrying Mary, John had a daughter named Melinda from a brief relationship with Zucco's wife Meili. Melinda later changes her surname from Zucco to Grayson-Lin to honor her father's memory.

== Other versions ==
- In Frank Miller's All Star Batman & Robin, the Boy Wonder on Earth-31, they appear in the first issue.
- An alternate timeline version of the Flying Graysons appears in Flashpoint.
- An Earth-37 Thrillkiller version of John, Mary and Dick Grayson are Johan Graustark, Petra Graustark and Rickart Graustark.
- The Flying Graysons appears in Lil Gotham.

== In other media ==
=== Television ===
- The Flying Graysons appear in the Batman: The Animated Series two-part episode "Robin's Reckoning", with John and Mary Grayson respectively voiced by Thomas F. Wilson and Diane Pershing.
- The Flying Graysons appear in a flashback in the Teen Titans episode "Haunted".
  - A poster of the Flying Graysons appears in Teen Titans Go! #47.
- The Flying Graysons appear in The Batman episode "A Matter of Family", with John and Mary Grayson respectively voiced by Kevin Conroy and Grey DeLisle.
- A poster of the Flying Graysons appears in the Young Justice episode "Performance".
  - The Flying Graysons appear in a flashback in issue #6 of the tie-in comic. This version of the group also consisted of Richard "Rick" Grayson (John's brother), Rick's wife Karla, and their son John II. While John, Mary, Karla, and John II were killed in the trapeze accident caused by Tony Zucco, Rick survived and was paralyzed from the fall.
- The Flying Graysons appear in the Gotham episode "The Blind Fortune Teller", with John and Mary Grayson respectively portrayed by Rob Gorrie and Abbi Snee.
- The Flying Graysons appear in the Teen Titans Go! episode "Rad Dudes with Bad Tudes", with John and Mary Grayson respectively voiced by Greg Cipes and Tara Strong.
- Ancestors of John Grayson appear in the Legends of Tomorrow episode "Freakshow" as members of P. T. Barnum's traveling circus.
- The Flying Graysons appear in flashbacks in Titans, with Mary portrayed by April Chodkowski and John by Randolf Hobbs.

=== Film ===
The Flying Graysons appear in Batman Forever, with John Grayson portrayed by Larry A. Lee and Mary Grayson by Glory Fioramonti. This version of the group also consisted of Dick's brother Mitch (portrayed by Mitch Gaylord), who was killed by Two-Face alongside his parents.

=== Video games ===
- Flying Graysons posters appear in the Batman: Arkham series.
- The Flying Graysons appear in Lego Batman: Legacy of the Dark Knight.
