= The Batman (TV series) =

American animated television series

- Genre: Action; Adventure; Superhero; Science fiction; Detective
- Based on: Batman by: Bob Kane; Bill Finger (uncredited)
- Developed by: Michael Goguen; Duane Capizzi
- Voices of: Rino Romano; Danielle Judovits; Eve Sabara (Note: Credited as Evan Sabara; Eve came out as a trans woman in 2020.); Alastair Duncan; Ming-Na Wen; Steve Harris; Mitch Pileggi; Kevin Michael Richardson; Tom Kenny; Clancy Brown; Gina Gershon; Piera Coppola; Adam West
- Theme music composer: The Edge (seasons 1–2); Andy Sturmer (seasons 3–5)
- Composer: Thomas Chase
- Country of origin: United States
- Original language: English
- No. of seasons: 5
- No. of episodes: 65 (list of episodes)

Production
- Executive producers: Sander Schwartz (seasons 1-4); Alan Burnett (seasons 1-4); Duane Capizzi (season 4-5)
- Producers: Linda M. Steiner; Jeff Matsuda (seasons 1–4); Glen Murakami (seasons 1–3)
- Editor: Margaret Hou
- Running time: 21–23 minutes
- Production companies: Warner Bros. Family Entertainment; DC Comics (seasons 3–5); Warner Bros. Animation

Original release
- Network: Kids' WB; Cartoon Network (2004–2006)
- Release: September 11, 2004 – March 8, 2008

Related
- Batman Beyond (1999–2001); Batman: The Brave and the Bold (2008–2011)

The Batman is an American animated television series based on the DC Comics superhero Batman. Developed by Michael Goguen and Duane Capizzi, and produced by Warner Bros. Animation and DC Comics for seasons 3–5, the series first aired on Kids' WB on September 11, 2004, then Cartoon Network on April 2, 2005. The show would become exclusive to the former network for its third to fifth seasons in early 2006. The Batman won six Daytime Emmy Awards over the course of its run. Many elements from previous Batman storylines were borrowed and adapted, such as those from the comic books, film series and the animated shows like Batman: The Animated Series from the DC Animated Universe, but it remained within its own continuity. Jackie Chan Adventures artist Jeff Matsuda served as art director and provided the character designs. The production team altered the appearances of many of the comic books' supervillains for the show, such as the Joker, the Penguin, Mr. Freeze, Bane, and the Riddler.

The entire series is available on DVD and Blu-ray. In 2005, a direct-to-DVD film titled The Batman vs. Dracula was released. The Batman also received a spin-off comic, The Batman Strikes!.

== Synopsis ==
Billionaire playboy Bruce Wayne (voiced by Rino Romano) is secretly The Batman, the costumed protector of Gotham City. The series focuses on Batman's earlier years of his crime-fighting career, as he began fighting crime three years prior to the start of the series, and the Gotham City police do not publicly acknowledge the vigilante's existence. Operating out of a secret lair underneath Bruce Wayne's mansion—known as the Batcave—Batman and his butler, Alfred Pennyworth (voiced by Alastair Duncan), stop crime with the assistance of high-tech gadgets and a supercomputer.

=== Season 1 ===
At the start of the first season, crime in Gotham is in decline, but Gotham Chief of Police Angel Rojas (voiced in the pilot by Edward James Olmos and later by Jesse Corti), orders his officers to hunt down Batman. This marks the first acknowledgement of Batman's existence in the series. Despite Rojas' orders, one of his detectives, Ethan Bennett (voiced by Steve Harris), believes the city needs Batman. At the start of the series, Bennett is assisted by a new partner from Metropolis, Ellen Yin (voiced by Ming-Na Wen), who becomes torn between her commitment to law and order and her feelings toward Batman.

Throughout season 1, both Bennett and Yin are tasked with capturing Batman. During this first season, Bruce Wayne finds himself torn between his responsibilities as Batman and his regular life, though the latter is supported by Gotham's mayor, Marion Grange (voiced by Adam West). By the end of the season, Bennett is exposed to the Joker's mutagenic Joker Putty and transformed into Clayface. As Clayface, he is forced into hiding, while his partner Yin finally realizes she was wrong about Batman and forms an alliance with him.

Among the villains introduced this season are the Joker (voiced by Kevin Michael Richardson), the Penguin (voiced by Tom Kenny), Catwoman (voiced by Gina Gershon), Mr. Freeze (voiced by Clancy Brown), Firefly (voiced by Jason Marsden), the Ventriloquist (voiced by Dan Castellaneta), Man-Bat (voiced by Peter MacNicol), Cluemaster (voiced by Glenn Shadix), and Bane (voiced by Joaquim de Almeida in his first appearance, Ron Perlman in his second, and Clancy Brown in his third).

=== Season 2 ===
Throughout the second season, Batman continues to act outside of the law even though he has Detective Yin as an ally. Batman begins making a name for himself as a force for good when he saves a group of policemen from certain doom. In this season, his heroic act prompts the officers to support him rather than pursue him as a criminal. In the season finale, Police Chief Rojas uncovers Yin's involvement with Batman, forcing her to go on the run. Around this time, James Gordon (voiced by Mitch Pileggi), becomes the police commissioner of Gotham. Unlike most of Gotham's police, Gordon is an ally of Batman.

This season introduces more villains, including Rag Doll (voiced by Jeff Bennett), the Riddler (voiced by Robert Englund), Killer Croc (voiced by Ron Perlman), Spellbinder (voiced by Michael Massee), and Solomon Grundy (voiced by Kevin Grevioux). Another new villain, Hugo Strange (initially voiced by Frank Gorshin, who is later replaced by Richard Green after Gorshin's death), is portrayed as a secondary character in the season. The characters Yin and Police Chief Rojas make their final appearances at the end of the season.

=== Season 3 ===
The third season introduces Barbara Gordon (voiced by Danielle Judovits), Jim Gordon's daughter, who later becomes Batgirl. The opening title sequence is altered and features a new theme performed by Andy Sturmer.

Batgirl appears before Dick Grayson, Batman's first sidekick in the comics, due to copyright issues regarding his simultaneous appearances in Teen Titans. This season also sees the destruction of Batman's original Batmobile, which is replaced by an updated version for the remainder of the series.

Several more new villains from the Batman mythos are introduced this season, including Poison Ivy (voiced by Piera Coppola), Gearhead (voiced by Will Friedle), Maxie Zeus (voiced by Phil LaMarr), the Toymaker (voiced by Patton Oswalt), Prank (voiced by Michael Reisz), Temblor (voiced by Jim Cummings), and D.A.V.E. (voiced Jeff Bennett). Hugo Strange becomes a villain this season, and is later imprisoned at Arkham Asylum.

=== Season 4 ===
The Bat-Family (Robin, Batman, and Batgirl) as they appeared in the season 4 and season 5 intro.

With the conclusion of Teen Titans in 2006, the fourth season introduces Dick Grayson (voiced by Eve Sabara (Note: Credited as Evan Sabara; Eve came out as a trans woman in 2020.)). The opening episode of the season focuses on Dick Grayson's origins as Robin, with Batman adopting him after his parents are murdered. The second episode in the season leads to Batgirl officially becoming part of the team, with each member revealing their secret identity to the others. In a potential future depicted in the episode "Artifacts", Dick and Barbara respectively become Nightwing (voiced by Jerry O'Connell) and Oracle (voiced by Kellie Martin).

More villains with new interpretations are once again introduced, including Tony Zucco (voiced by Mark Hamill), Killer Moth (voiced by Jeff Bennett), Black Mask (voiced by James Remar), Rumor (voiced by Ron Perlman), the Everywhere Man (voiced by Brandon Routh), Harley Quinn (voiced by Hynden Walch), and Francis Grey (voiced by Dave Foley). Additionally, Ethan Bennett is cured, with Basil Karlo (voiced by Wallace Langham in the first appearance, and Lex Lang in the second appearance) succeeding him as Clayface. This season also introduces the Justice League, though only Martian Manhunter (voiced by Dorian Harewood) has a speaking appearance.

This was the final season worked on by Jeff Matsuda and Michael Jelenic, with both leaving the show after the season finale.

=== Season 5 ===
The final season on The Batman, season 5, focused primarily on Batman and Robin, with the pair teaming up with some of the DC Universe's characters to battle different villains. The League consists of Martian Manhunter, Superman (voiced by George Newbern), Green Arrow (voiced by Chris Hardwick), the Flash (voiced by Charlie Schlatter), Green Lantern (voiced by Dermot Mulroney), and Hawkman (voiced by Robert Patrick). Producer Alan Burnett described the season as the show's "The Brave and the Bold season". Both Batgirl and Commissioner Gordon were relegated to either guest or cameo appearances during the season, with Barbara moving to attend college. The two-part series finale, "Lost Heroes", has Batman and the League battle a second invasion by the Joining.

Most of the villains featured in the season are enemies of other heroes. They include Lex Luthor (voiced by Clancy Brown), Mercy Graves (voiced by Gwendoline Yeo), Metallo (voiced by Lex Lang), Count Vertigo (voiced by Greg Ellis), Toyman (voiced by Richard Green), Shadow Thief (voiced by Diedrich Bader), Sinestro (voiced by Miguel Ferrer), and Mirror Master (voiced by John Larroquette). Only the Terrible Trio (voiced by David Faustino, Grey DeLisle, and Googy Gress), Wrath (voiced by Christopher Gorham), and Firefly's Phosphorus form are reinterpretations of Batman villains.

== Cast ==
=== Main ===
- Rino Romano as Bruce Wayne / Batman
- Alastair Duncan as Alfred Pennyworth
- Eve Sabara (Note: Credited as Evan Sabara; Eve came out as a trans woman in 2020.) as Dick Grayson / Robin
- Danielle Judovits as Barbara Gordon / Batgirl

== Episodes ==
Season	Episodes	Originally released		
Season	Episodes	First released	Last released	Network
1	13	September 11, 2004	May 7, 2005	Cartoon Network/Kids' WB
2	13	May 14, 2005	September 10, 2005	Cartoon Network/Kids' WB
Movie		October 18, 2005		Cartoon Network
3	13	September 17, 2005	May 13, 2006	Kids' WB
4	13	September 23, 2006	May 5, 2007	Kids' WB
5	13	September 22, 2007	March 8, 2008	Kids' WB

== Production ==
Jeff Matsuda acquired the Batman license while he was working on Jackie Chan Adventures, but after the first season concluded rumors of the show might not get picked up for another season and Matsuda immediately looked to work on another show.

Kevin Michael Richardson was initially upset when he got approached for the role of the Joker because he didn't want to see Mark Hamill to be recasted, However, his anger and frustration that he had in the audition led to him getting cast.

== Home media ==
All of the DVD releases of The Batman are released by Warner Home Video (via DC Entertainment and Warner Bros. Family Entertainment) and presented in its original broadcast version and in story continuity order. The DVD releases of The Batman are also presented in a 4:3 fullscreen aspect ratio, but the entire series is available in its original 16:9 widescreen aspect ratio on Amazon Video, Blu-ray, Google Play, Max, Netflix, Tubi and the Xbox Video Store. The first two seasons and The Batman vs. Dracula film are available on iTunes in 16:9. In March 2022, Warner Bros. Home Entertainment released the series on Blu-ray, with The Batman vs. Dracula film being left out, with no reason given for its exclusion.

- The Complete First Season DVD (2 discs, episodes 1–13) (release date: February 7, 2006)
- The Complete Second Season DVD (2 discs, episodes 14–26) (release date: September 12, 2006)
- The Complete Third Season DVD (2 discs, episodes 27–39) (release date: April 10, 2007)
- The Complete Fourth Season DVD (2 discs, episodes 40–52) (release date: November 20, 2007)
- The Complete Fifth Season DVD (2 discs, episodes 53–65) (release date: July 8, 2008)
- The Complete Series Blu-ray (6 discs, release date: March 1, 2022), Batman vs Dracula film is not included.
- The Batman vs. Dracula DVD (1 disc, feature-length animated film) (release date: October 18, 2005)

On March 1, 2026, The Batman is one of the 100 Warner Bros.-owned animated series that added to the Fox Corporation-owned FAST/AVOD streaming service Tubi.

== The Batman official games ==
=== The Batman Plug and Play TV video game ===
The Batman Plug and Play TV Video Game (a.k.a. Plug 'n Play) was released in 2004 by Jakks Pacific. It features The Batman tracking down notable villains from the show, including The Joker, Firefly, Mr. Freeze, Bane, and Penguin. The game comes with a custom controller which connects to a TV via RCA connectors.

=== The Batman: The CobbleBot Caper ===
The Batman: The CobbleBot Caper is a Macromedia Flash Toonami game released on the Cartoon Network website in 2005. It has similar gameplay to the Plug and Play game and features Penguin and the Kabuki Twins.

== The Batman Strikes! ==
The Batman Strikes! is a DC comic book series featuring Batman and is a spin-off comic book series of The Batman. Part of DC's line for young readers, the series lasted 50 issues in total, with the last issue shipping in October 2008.

=== Collected editions ===
Title	Material collected	ISBN
The Batman Strikes! Volume 1: Crime Time	#1–5	SC: 978-1-4012-0509-6
The Batman Strikes! Volume 2: In Darkest Night	#6–10	SC: 978-1-4012-0510-2
The Batman Strikes! Volume 3: Duty Calls	#11–14, 16–18	SC: 978-1-4012-1548-4

== Crew ==
- Michael Goguen – Supervising producer
- Duane Capizzi – Supervising producer (Seasons 1-3)
- Glen Murakami – Producer (seasons 1-3)
- Jeff Matsuda – Producer (seasons 1-4)
- Linda M. Steiner – Producer
- Sander Schwartz – Executive producer (seasons 1-4)
- Alan Burnett – Executive producer (seasons 1-4) and supervising producer (season 5)
- Duane Capizzi – Executive producer (Seasons 4-5)
- Kimberly A. Smith – Associate producer (seasons 1-3)
- Kimberly A. Smith – Line producer (seasons 4-5)
- Sam Liu – Director
- Brandon Vietti – Director
- Seung Eun Kim – Director
- Michael Hack – Casting director
- Ginny McSwain – Casting director
- Andrea Romano – Casting director (seasons 4–5)
- Ginny McSwain – Voice director (seasons 1–3)
- Andrea Romano – Voice director (seasons 4–5)
- The Edge – Theme music creator (seasons 1-2)
- Andy Sturmer – Theme music (seasons 3–5)

== Awards ==
The Batman received Annie Award nominations for Annie Award for Best Animated Television Production in 2005 and 2006, and for Best Music in a Television Production in 2006.

The Batman was nominated for 12 Daytime Emmy Awards during its five-year run, with a total of six wins.

In 2005, it was nominated for Outstanding Special Class Animated Program, Outstanding Performer in an Animated Program (Kevin Michael Richardson as the Joker), Outstanding Music Direction and Composition, and Outstanding Sound Editing – Live Action and Animation (for which it won).

In 2006, it was nominated and won Outstanding Special Class Animated Program and Outstanding Sound Editing – Live Action and Animation.

In 2007, it was nominated for Outstanding Special Class Animated Program and won Outstanding Sound Editing – Live Action and Animation.

In 2008, it was nominated for Outstanding Special Class Animated Program and Outstanding Performer in an Animated Program (Kevin Michael Richardson as the Joker), and won Outstanding Sound Editing – Live Action and Animation, and Outstanding Sound Mixing – Live Action and Animation.

The Batman was also nominated for Motion Picture Sound Editors "Golden Reel Awards" for Sound Effects Editing in 2005, 2008, and 2009, winning in 2008.

== Reception ==
IGN wrote that the series failed to win over diehard Batman fans the way Batman: The Animated Series did, but noted that it remained popular enough to last for five seasons.

Over time, the overall reception of the series has become more positive and it has developed a cult following.

== Unrealized Superman spin-off ==
In June 2006, during an interview about Superman: Brainiac Attacks, writer Duane Capizzi mentioned a Superman series set in the same universe of The Batman, a possibility supported by Superman's revealed existence during the show's fifth season. Despite this, the expansion was never realized, and Capizzi never again mentioned the spin-off.

== See also ==
- The Batman vs. Dracula
- Batman: The Animated Series
- The New Batman Adventures
- Batman Beyond
- Batman: The Brave and the Bold
- Beware the Batman
