= Rags Morales =

American comic artist

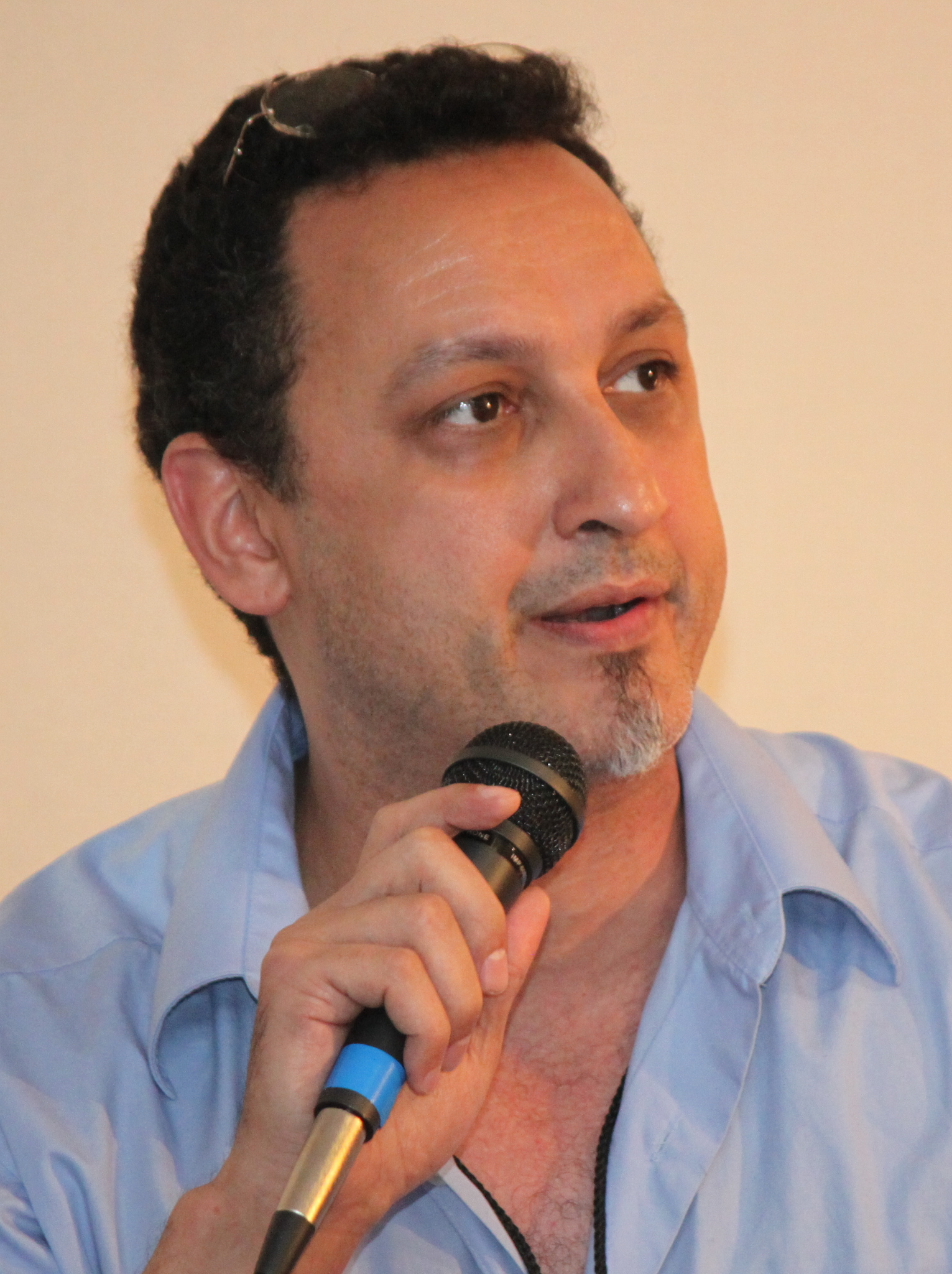
- Morales at the 2012 Florida Supercon
- Born: Ralph Morales
- Areas: Penciller, Inker
- Notable works: Identity Crisis; Countdown to Infinite Crisis; Action Comics

Ralph "Rags" Morales (/məˈræləs/) is an American comic book artist known for his work on various books for DC Comics, including Identity Crisis, Countdown to Infinite Crisis, Batman Confidential, and The New 52 reboot of then Superman-centric Action Comics.

Morales is the co-creator, along with Brian Augustyn, of the 1990s version of Black Condor.

== Early life ==
Rags Morales was born in New York. He is of Puerto Rican descent, and grew up in a predominantly white suburb of the city. Morales attended a number of vocational art classes, including The Kubert School in Dover, New Jersey.

== Career ==
Morales' first professional work was penciling 19 issues of Forgotten Realms with writer Jeff Grubb as part of the TSR line of books. Following Forgotten Realms, Morales co-created and pencilled Black Condor.

Morales left DC Comics to do work for Valiant Comics, including Turok, Archer & Armstrong and Geomancer. He also did some licensed work on a Sliders comic book, and work for Wizards of the Coast. After Valiant closed, Morales returned to his TSR roots, doing work for Dungeons & Dragons magazines and novella work for HarperCollins, such as Isaac Asimov's Robotics and pen and ink work for Margaret Weis' Testament of the Dragon. He also taught anatomical illustration at a vo-tech school.

In 1999, Morales was made the penciler on DC's on Hourman, penciling 20 of that series 25 issues before it was canceled in 2001. Over the course of the following year, he drew nine intermittent issues of JSA between issue #9 and issue #34, before moving onto Hawkman with writer Geoff Johns. It was also on Hawkman that he first worked with inker Michael Bair, with whom he has worked on most of his projects since. At the time Morales said "when I saw the magic that Michael Bair added to my work, I knew I had to stick with this dude".

After Hawkman, Morales illustrated Brad Meltzer's limited series Identity Crisis. Because of the importance of Identity Crisis to DC's ongoing company-wide storyline, and because of the number of characters in it, including minor ones that had barely been seen in years, Morales used copious amounts of reference materials for character studies, including the use of famous actors' faces to give the characters unique facial features, and sometimes updating their costumes in the process. The series was eventually selected by The Young Adult Library Services Association (YALSA)'s 2007 recommended list of Great Graphic Novels For Teens.

Morales and Bair worked on Nightwing during Peter Tomasi's run as writer on that title. He later worked on Superman/Batman #53 - 56, which were among the seven issues collected in to the Finest Worlds hardcover in 2009, and in trade paperback form in 2010.

In 2009 he contributed to the "Blackest Night" storyline with the three issues miniseries, Blackest Night: Tales of the Corps.

In June 2011, as part of DC Comics' massive relaunch of their entire superhero line, Morales was announced as the artist on the new Action Comics #1, teaming with writer Grant Morrison.

In September 2018, Morales was named Inkwell Awards Special Ambassador.

== Art style ==
Regarding his figure work, Morales finds stock, poster-like standing poses difficult, preferring the more communicative movement seen among characters in narrative sequences, a forte he feels helped him attain the Identity Crisis assignment.

== Bibliography ==
=== Valiant/Acclaim ===
- Archer & Armstrong #13 (1993)
- Bloodshot #9 (1998)
- Eternal Warriors: Mog #1 (1998)
- Geomancer #1-3, 5-6 (1994–95)
- Sliders Special #2 (along with Dean Zachary) (1997)
- Turok, Dinosaur Hunter #4-6, 10-13, 15-16, 24-27, 30, 34 37-38, 41-44, 47 (1993–96)

=== DC ===
- Action Comics, vol. 2, #1-18 (with Grant Morrison, 2011)
- Batman Confidential #13-16 (2008)
- Black Condor #1-6, 9-12 (1992–93)
- Blackest Night: Tales of the Corps, miniseries, #1 (with writer Geoff Johns, 2009)
- First Wave, miniseries, #1-6 (with writer Brian Azzarello, 2010)
- Forgotten Realms
- Hawkman, vol. 4, #1-12, 15-17, 20-25 (with writers Geoff Johns/James Robinson, 2003–04)
- Hourman #1-11, 14-16, 18-19, 21, 23-25 (1999–2001)
- Identity Crisis, miniseries, #1-7 (with writer Brad Meltzer, 2004–05)
- JSA, vol. 2, #26-27 (2001); #83-85 (along with Luke Ross, 2006)
- JSA: Classified #19-20 (with writer Scott Beatty, 2007)
- Nightwing #140-142, 145, 148 (with writer Peter Tomasi)
- Wonder Woman, vol. 2, #215-217, 219, 221, 223 (with writer Greg Rucka, 2005–06)

== See also ==
- List of Puerto Ricans
