= Wrath (comics) =

The Wrath
- Wrath as depicted in Batman Special #1 (June 1984). Art by Michael Golden.

Publication information
- Publisher: DC Comics
- First appearance: (First Wrath); Batman Special #1 (June 1984) (Caldwell); Batman Confidential #13 (March 2008)
- Created by: (First Wrath); Mike W. Barr (writer); Michael Golden (artist) (Caldwell); Tony Bedard (writer); Rags Morales (artist)

In-story information
- Alter ego: Unknown (first Wraith); Elliot Caldwell
- Species: Human

Wrath is the name of two supervillains appearing in American comic books published by DC Comics. The original Wrath debuted in Batman Special #1 (1984), and was created by Mike W. Barr and Michael Golden, who served as a criminal foil personality to the superhero Batman, after the creation of Killer Moth (in 1951) and prior to the creations of the villains Prometheus (in 1998) and Hush (in 2003), all serving the same purpose. The second Wrath debuted in Batman Confidential #13 (March 2008), and was created by Tony Bedard and Rags Morales.

== Publication history ==
Wrath's debut story was titled "The Player on the Other Side", published in Batman Special #1 (1984). The title was based on the essay "A Liberal Education and Where to Find It" by Thomas Henry Huxley (although mistakenly attributed to Aldous Huxley by Bruce Wayne). It is also a reference to the Ellery Queen novel of the same name, as the story's author, Mike W. Barr, is a renowned Queen enthusiast.

A Post-Infinite Crisis legacy version of Wrath debuted in the pages of Batman Confidential #13 in a story arc written by Tony Bedard, with Elliott Caldwell, the 'student' of the original Wrath, taking on his mentor's mantle.

== Fictional character biography ==
=== The original Wrath ===
The original Wrath as depicted in Batman Special #1 (June 1984). Art by Michael Golden.

The first Wrath is an enemy of Batman, described by him as his "opposite number". Wrath's appearance and motivation are reminiscent of Batman's, but with notable differences. Wrath (like Batman) is distinguished by perfectionism and obsession with what he does. His costume is also similar to Batman's, though colored in crimson and purple with a W-insignia on the chest and cowl.

Wrath's parents were burglars like Joe Chill, the man who shot and killed Batman's parents. They were killed in a shootout with a police officer the same day that Batman's parents were gunned down in Crime Alley. Due to this, Wrath dedicated his life to a campaign of revenge against law and law-enforcers. Independently of one another, Batman and Wrath adopt strikingly similar costumes and skill-sets, although they use them for opposite purposes.

When Wrath returns to Gotham City, he comes to kill the man who had shot his parents. Wrath's target turns out to be Commissioner Gordon of the Gotham City Police Department, which leads to Wrath coming into conflict with Batman. In the course of their impersonal battle of wits, Wrath learns Batman's secret identity as Bruce Wayne and proceeds to attack several of his friends; Alfred Pennyworth is hospitalized, and Leslie Thompkins is taken hostage by Wrath.

During his rooftop showdown with Batman, one of Wrath's explosive capsules detonates during the fight; Batman's attempt to throw Wrath off him leads to the villain accidentally landing in his fire and falling over the edge to his death.

In Batman Confidential, several details of Wrath's origin underwent a retcon, including the original story taking place shortly after Dick Grayson became Robin. Wrath's father was a corrupt cop who was killed by Jim Gordon in self-defense along with his wife. Additionally, Wrath is now depicted as having copied Batman, whereas in his original appearance, the two developed similar personas independently. While preparing to assassinate Gordon, Wrath studied Batman and initially planned to dress like him to needle Gordon. However, Wrath concluded that they were kindred spirits inspired by a similar disaster in their lives and duplicated Batman's costume and equipment as an homage - to the extent that he began training his own "Robin", who went on to become the second Wrath.

=== Elliot Caldwell ===
Elliot Caldwell / Wrath as depicted in Batman Confidential #15 (May 2008). Art by Rags Morales.

Sporting an all-purple costume, this Wrath, who Batman deduces is a copycat from his first appearance owing to the differences in age, physical build, and training, begins murdering police officers visiting Gotham for a convention and breaks into Gayle Hudson's apartment. After a fight with Batman - during which he confirms that he is not the original Wrath and is unaware of Batman's true identity - he tells the Dark Knight to investigate Commissioner Gordon's actions on June 26, 25 years ago, the same night that Bruce Wayne's parents died. Upon another meeting with Batman, Wrath tells a distorted version of the events that happened, saying Gordon killed Wrath's parents in cold blood, though Batman saw through this and realized that Gordon shot them in self-defense. His subsequent assessment of the original Wrath helps Batman determine the identity of the second one; as Wrath sought to duplicate all of Batman's methods, Batman concludes that the second Wrath must be the original's equivalent of Robin.

=== The New 52 ===
The New 52 continuity reboot introduces a new incarnation of Wrath who merges elements of the previous two versions of the character, having an origin similar to the first Wrath and the name Elliot Caldwell. This version is the CEO of Caldwell Tech and a sociopathic killer who is served by Scorn soldiers. Batman defeats Wrath and has him imprisoned in Blackgate Penitentiary, where he allies with Emperor Blackgate.

== In other media ==
- An original incarnation of Wrath named William Mallory appears in The Batman episode "The End of the Batman", voiced by Christopher Gorham. This version is the son of thieves whose imprisonment motivated him to help criminals under the belief that they have a right to make a living as much as innocents do. Additionally, he is assisted by his younger brother Andy Mallory / Scorn (voiced by Daryl Sabara).
- Wrath and Scorn appear as character summons in Scribblenauts Unmasked: A DC Comics Adventure.

== See also ==
- List of Batman family enemies
