= Robin's Reckoning =

- Batman: The Animated Series episodes
- The title card from "Robin's Reckoning" Part 1
- Episode nos.: Season 1 Episodes 51 and 52
- Directed by: Dick Sebast
- Written by: Randy Rogel
- Based on: Batman by Bob Kane (credited) and Bill Finger (uncredited)
- Original air dates: 7 February 1993; 14 February 1993; Thomas F. Wilson as Tony Zucco; Eugene Roche as Arnold Stromwell

Episode chronology
← Previous "The Cape and Cowl Conspiracy"	Next → "The Laughing Fish"

"Robin's Reckoning" is a two-part episode of Batman: The Animated Series. The episodes originally aired on February 7 and 14, 1993, and were written by Randy Rogel and directed by Dick Sebast. It earned the series a Primetime Emmy Award for Outstanding Animated Program (For Programming One Hour or Less) and is considered one of the best episodes of the series. The second part aired a week later.

The story is based on the origin of Robin (Dick Grayson) from Detective Comics #38 (April 1940), which it shows through flashbacks, intercutting an unfolding mystery in the present with the more significant moments of Robin's life. It touches on Robin uncovering who killed his family and how he first met and joined forces with Batman. Meanwhile, with Batman leaving Robin out of his investigation of Tony Zucco it also shows the beginning of how Batman and Robin are slowly growing apart as the latter gets older, which eventually culminates in a falling-out where Dick abandons his role as Robin as depicted in The New Batman Adventures episode "Old Wounds".

== Plot ==
=== Part 1 ===
During a stake-out at a construction site, Batman and Robin catch a gang of mobsters trying to sabotage it, as the wealthy architect refused to be extorted by them. While all but one of the mobsters escapes, Batman catches the straggler and demands the name of his boss. The criminal refuses to speak to him or the police, but when Batman shows he's not joking, the criminal blurts out the name "Billy Marin", a name that seems to disturb Batman. When they return home, Robin is left wondering who Marin really is, but Batman insists that Robin stay out of this one: he works alone for the time being. Following Batman's departure, Robin and Alfred Pennyworth use the Batcave's criminal database to determine the real identity of the crime boss. Robin discovers that Marin is really an alias for Tony Zucco, someone he crossed paths with nine years ago in an event which changed his life.

As a young child, Dick Grayson was in a popular circus acrobat trio with his parents, "The Flying Graysons". While performing at a Wayne charity convention in Gotham City, Dick overhears Zucco threaten the ringmaster, Mr. Haley, telling him that if he doesn't pay money for "protection", accidents will happen. Haley, who takes pride in running an honest business, violently refuses, and in response, Zucco partially saws through a trapeze rope to be used in the Graysons' act. Later, the rope snaps and the Graysons plummet to their deaths. Bruce Wayne, who is in the audience, takes pity on Dick and adopts him. As Batman, he becomes obsessed with finding Zucco, to the point that he is rarely home, leaving Dick mostly alone.

Batman tracks down Zucco at his uncle Arnold Stromwell's mansion, where he overhears Stromwell angrily disowning Zucco and kicked out of the family for bringing Batman down on their heads. Suddenly, Stromwell's guards are alerted to Batman on the property. After fleeing from Batman, Zucco slips out of Gotham, leaving Batman frustrated for not catching him. As Batman returns to the Batcave, Alfred reminds him that Dick is feeling unloved and scared, which prompts Bruce to realize he must spend more time with him. He tries to comfort the boy, but Dick breaks down in tears and says that he feels responsible for his parents' death. Bruce says that he felt the same way when his own parents were murdered, but assures Dick that the pain will ease in time, and hugs him for the first time.

After discovering the crook's identity and reliving the tragedy, Robin realizes that Batman left him out of this to keep him out of the way. Robin begs Batman to let him help, but Batman refuses. Vowing revenge, Robin deliberately disobeys Batman's orders and leaves on his motorbike to find Zucco.

=== Part 2 ===
Batman tracks Tony Zucco while, secretly, Robin seeks to find Zucco to avenge his parents' death. As the investigation narrows to an abandoned amusement park, a series of flashbacks finish Robin's origin story.

After Zucco's escape from Stromwell, Bruce and Dick grow closer, engaging in a playful fencing match. Alfred then tells Bruce that Jim Gordon is convinced that Zucco might soon try to flee from Gotham, prompting Dick to take matters into his own hands. After running away from Wayne Manor, he unsuccessfully tries to track Zucco. While searching a run-down section of Gotham and avoiding Batman, who, unbeknownst to Dick, is also searching for Zucco, Dick rescues a woman threatened by a large man, knocking him unconscious. The woman treats Dick to dinner in a local diner where a waitress identifies Zucco from a photo. She informs Dick that Zucco is squatting in the condemned building across the street. Dick and Batman find Zucco at roughly the same time, but Dick attacks Zucco, who throws him over a spillway. Batman rescues Dick before he can go over a waterfall, but Zucco uses the distraction to escape. Batman brings Dick back to the Batcave, revealing his secret identity. He then suggests that Dick's "temporary" stay become indefinite, which Dick accepts.

As the flashback ends, Robin continues his search on his motorcycle. He uses a phone tracer to obtain Zucco's address; in a fit of paranoia, Zucco fires a submachine gun repeatedly into the ceiling, worried about a noise. An injured Batman falls through the weakened ceiling. Using a smoke bomb as a diversion, he limps from the room. Hiding in the amusement park, he hardly has time to treat his wounds before being attacked by Zucco's henchmen. Though limping, he picks off the thugs one-by-one through stealth, fighting several on the carousel. After the brawl, however, Zucco has the advantage over Batman and prepares to shoot him. At the last moment, Robin crashes through the fence while riding his motorcycle, drives straight at Zucco and, grabbing him by the collar, drags him to the end of a pier. He holds Zucco over the edge, determined to kill him. Batman arrives and desperately implores Robin not to let his emotions control him, but Robin lashes out at his mentor, exclaiming that he cannot know how he feels. When Batman remains silent, Robin suddenly remembers that Batman is actually the one person he knows who would know. Abashed, Robin apologizes and relents, handing Zucco over to Commissioner Gordon and the GCPD.

As Zucco is hauled away, Robin tells Batman that Batman was right to leave him out of the investigation, as his emotions made him unstable. In a rare moment of vulnerability, Batman explains that he distanced Robin from the investigation because he feared his partner would be killed. The two crimefighters reconcile and leave the pier.

== Voice cast ==
- Kevin Conroy as Bruce Wayne / Batman
- Bob Hastings as Commissioner Gordon
- Efrem Zimbalist Jr. as Alfred Pennyworth
- Loren Lester as Dick Grayson / Robin
  - Joey Simmrin as young Dick
- Thomas F. Wilson as Tony Zucco
- Eugene Roche as Arnold Stromwell
- Paul Eiding as Ferris Dolan
- Ed Gilbert as Jack Haly
- Linda Gary as Berty
- Rebecca Gilchrist as Chi-Chi
- Charles Howerton as Lennie
- Lionel Mark Smith as Bus Driver

=== Additional voices ===
- Diane Pershing
- Brion James
- Roger Rose

== Reception ==
"Robin's Reckoning" has received a great deal of praise from both critics and fans of Batman: The Animated Series, often cited among the show's best episodes. The A.V. Club state that the episode's direction "handles energetic action sequences and heavy emotional moments with equal aplomb", and that the script has "philosophical and psychological depth". Batman On Film states that "there's little debate about 'Robin's Reckoning' being two of the best episodes in the entire run of [the series]", praising the emotional depth and power of the events depicted. IGN ranked it 3rd in their top 10 best episodes of B:TAS.
