= Piera Coppola =

American voice actress

- Born: April 22, 1968 (age 57)
- Occupation: Voice actress

Piera Coppola (born April 22, 1968) is an American voice actress.

== Voice over roles ==
=== Film ===
- Joseph: King of Dreams (2000) — Zuleika's servant, additional voices

=== Television ===
- The Batman (2005–2007) — Pamela Lilian Isley / Poison Ivy

=== Video games ===
- Warcraft III: Reign of Chaos (2002) — Sylvanas Windrunner
- Warcraft III: The Frozen Throne (2003) — Sylvanas Windrunner
- World of Warcraft (2004) — Sylvanas Windrunner
- Neopets: The Darkest Faerie (2005) — The Darkest Faerie (Created for Sony PlayStation 2 with Neopets)
- Rise of the Argonauts (2008) — Medea
- Warcraft III: Reforged (2020) — Sylvanas Windrunner
