= Gearhead (DC Comics) =

Gearhead is the name of two supervillains appearing in American comic books published by DC Comics.

== Publication history ==
The unidentified Gearhead first appeared in Steel (vol. 2) #14.

The Nathan Finch incarnation of Gearhead first appeared in Detective Comics #712 (August 1997), and was created by Chuck Dixon, Graham Nolan, and Bob McLeod.

== Fictional character biographies ==
=== Unrevealed ===
Gearhead

Publication information
- Publisher: DC Comics
- First appearance: Steel (vol. 2) #14 (April 1995)

In-story information
- Species: Human cyborg
- Place of origin: New Earth

The first Gearhead is a henchman of the supervillain White Rabbit.

=== Nathaniel Finch ===
Gearhead

Publication information
- Publisher: DC Comics
- First appearance: Detective Comics #712 (August 1997)
- Created by: Chuck Dixon (writer); Graham Nolan (artist); Bob McLeod (artist)

In-story information
- Alter ego: Nathaniel Finch
- Species: Human cyborg
- Place of origin: New Earth
- Team affiliations: Secret Society of Super Villains
- Notable aliases: Nathan Finch
- Abilities: Cybernetic engineering Mechanical body enhancements

The second Gearhead is Nathaniel Finch, a former engineer at General Robotics. After kidnapping his boss' daughter Gloria Osteen, Finch encounters Batman, falls into Gotham's waters, and is presumed dead. Finch's body is discovered by two down-and-out people, who take him to Dr. Bascomb. Bascomb is forced to remove Finch's limbs, which have been ravaged by frostbite, and replaces them with prosthetics. Following training with his cybernetic limbs, Finch becomes Gearhead and develops his own cybernetic arsenal of removable body parts as well as a goal to exterminate Batman, whom he refers to as "vermin".

Gearhead appears in the Batman: No Man's Land crossover event, in which he is one of numerous villains competing for control of Gotham City's sewers. Having lost the use of his cybernetic limbs, he is forced into partnership with the thuggish Tommy Mangles, who carries him around. Gearhead and Mangles become lost in the sewers and discover Mr. Freeze's hideout. Freeze captures Gearhead and Mangles, freezes them, and leaves for his storage room. After Robin defeats Freeze and Ratcatcher, the Gotham City Police Department finds the frozen bodies of Gearhead and Tommy Mangles and takes them into police custody.

Gearhead appears in the miniseries Rush City, where he is physically attached to his car. Gearhead pursues Rush and Black Canary, only for Rush to release an EMP that disables Gearhead. Gearhead recovers and brings out drills and saws from the engine of his car to attack. Rush and Black Canary work together to disable Gearhead.

In Infinite Crisis, Gearhead joins Alexander Luthor Jr.'s Secret Society of Super Villains.

== Powers and abilities ==
The Nathaniel Finch incarnation of Gearhead has genius-level intellect and wields cybernetic limbs and other devices.

== In other media ==
Gearhead as he appears in The Batman.

- The Nathaniel Finch incarnation of Gearhead appears in The Batman, voiced by Will Friedle. This version is a criminal racer who can remotely hack into and upgrade vehicles and possesses retractable claws.
- Two action figures of Gearhead, referred to as "Metal Head" for legal reasons, were produced as part of Mattel's The Batman toyline.
- The Batman incarnation of Nathan Finch / Gearhead appears in the tie-in comic The Batman Strikes!, which reveals that he was previously a celebrity racer before being injured in an accident that left him quadriplegic and receiving cybernetic enhancements from an unknown benefactor.

== See also ==
- List of Batman family enemies
