= Tony Zucco =

DC Comics Character

Publication information
- Publisher: DC Comics
- First appearance: Detective Comics #38 (April 1940)
- Created by: Bill Finger (writer); Bob Kane (artist); Jerry Robinson (Illustrator)

In-story information
- Alter ego: Boss Zucco
- Species: Human
- Team affiliations: Maroni family Black Lantern Corps

Anthony Zucco is a fictional character appearing in American comic books published by DC Comics. First appearing in Detective Comics #38 (April 1940), Zucco is a mobster responsible for murdering the parents of Dick Grayson, which leads to Grayson's adoption by Bruce Wayne a.k.a. Batman and becoming the latter's sidekick and original Robin and Nightwing.

The character has appeared in Batman: The Animated Series, voiced by Thomas F. Wilson, and The Batman, voiced by Mark Hamill. Richard Zeppieri portrayed him in the first season of the DC Universe series Titans.

== Publication history ==
Tony Zucco first appeared in Detective Comics #38 (April 1940) and was created by Bob Kane, Bill Finger, and Jerry Robinson.

== Fictional character history ==
=== Pre-Crisis ===
Antonio Zucco is a Mafia crime boss or thug in Gotham City who is responsible for the death of Dick Grayson's parents. Throughout the years, Zucco's role in Robin's origin remains largely the same.

Zucco tries to extort Haly's Circus, where the Flying Graysons are the main attraction. When ringmaster Jack Haly refuses to pay him protection money, Zucco has his henchman Blade sabotage the trapeze ropes, causing the Graysons to fall to their deaths. After overhearing Blade talking to Zucco about committing the sabotage, Dick Grayson is subsequently adopted by Batman and becomes his partner Robin, helping him to arrest Zucco.

Some years later, Tony Zucco had become senile. Robin is affected by the Stream of Ruthlessness and fights his way past Infinity, Inc. to get to Zucco's hospital room, only to discover that Zucco does not remember him.

=== Post-Crisis ===
==== Batman: Year Three ====
Zucco is an Italian immigrant who is orphaned at a young age when a gang of criminals murder his parents for refusing to pay protection money. Zucco is sent to an orphanage, where he is cared for by Sister Mary Elizabeth. She tries to counsel Zucco, but he is a lost cause; consumed by anger, he prays only for the deaths of the men who killed his parents. As a young man, he runs away from the orphanage and joins one of Gotham's major crime families.

After Batman apprehends him for murdering Dick Grayson's parents, Zucco is sentenced to two consecutive life sentences in Blackgate Penitentiary. After serving seven years of his sentence, he files for a parole hearing and testifies against other Gotham criminals. He professes remorse for his crimes, but hides an ulterior motive. Before he was sent to prison, Zucco previously hid a ledger containing incrimating evidence against the mafia in the orphanage where Dick briefly resided following his parents' deaths, and wants to retrieve it before the orphanage is demolished. Wanting to keep the truth from Dick, Alfred Pennyworth goes to the parole hearing and pleads for the judge to keep Zucco in prison, but Dick soon learns of his release. Despite Alfred's attempts to stop him, Dick races to Blackgate to confront his parents' killer. As he steps out of the prison, Zucco is killed by a helicopter sent by rival crime boss.

==== Batman: Dark Victory ====
In Batman: Dark Victory, Zucco is a low-level thug working for Sal Maroni and a member of Carmine Falcone's criminal empire. He and minor family head Edward Skeevers are put in charge of drug smuggling. Zucco attempts to take over Haly's Circus to use its trucks for his smuggling activities, kills Dick Grayson's parents as a demonstration of power, and disappears. He is later found by Batman and Dick Grayson and has a fatal heart attack, confessing to his crimes before dying.

In Blackest Night, Zucco is revived as a Black Lantern and attacks Robin and Red Robin until they force him to retreat.

==== The Black Mirror ====
In The Black Mirror, it is revealed that Zucco has a daughter named Sonia, who is the head of the GGM Bank under the alias of Sonia Branch. Dick Grayson, who has become Batman, hopes that Sonia is not as corrupt as her father. However, he is disappointed when he realizes that Sonia manipulated him into subduing rivals who wish to take over her bank. Due to a lack of evidence, Sonia remains beyond the reach of the law.

=== The New 52 ===
Tony Zucco in Nightwing (vol. 3) #18 (May 2013, DC Comics), art by Juan Jose Ryp.

In The New 52 (a reboot of DC Universe's continuity), Zucco disappears after being arrested and is presumed dead. However, his daughter Sonia informs Nightwing that he is still alive and working in Chicago under its mayor Wallace Cole, who has declared him legally dead. Zucco later helps Nightwing battle the Prankster, whose father he killed. Nightwing was able to defeat both villains and left them for the police. In jail, Zucco receives a visit from a man who suggests that his employers can help him beat the rap. Zucco insists that he wants to take responsibility to set a good example for his son. The man says there is no point in that, as Zucco's family has left him.

=== Infinite Frontier ===
In Infinite Frontier, Zucco appears to have another daughter named Melinda who is the mayor of Blüdhaven. Later issues reveal that John Grayson is Melinda's father, making her and Dick half-siblings. Melinda's mother Meili Lin was forced to marry Zucco and had a brief relationship with John while staying with Haly's Circus.

Zucco is eventually released from prison and returns to Blüdhaven to fill in the power vacuum of the criminal underworld after Blockbuster's death. Zucco is killed by Heartless to prevent Nightwing from bringing him to justice.

== Other versions ==
=== All Star Batman & Robin, the Boy Wonder ===
Jocko-boy Vanzetti, a character based on Tony Zucco, appears in All Star Batman & Robin, the Boy Wonder.

=== Earth-Three ===
An alternate universe version of Tony Zucco from Earth-Three appears in Forever Evil. This version is a clown who is killed by Jonathan Grayson.

== In other media ==
=== Television ===
- Tony Zucco appears in the Batman: The Animated Series episode "Robin's Reckoning", voiced by Thomas F. Wilson. This version is the nephew of crime boss Arnold Stromwell.
- Tony Zucco appears in The Batman episode "A Matter of Family", voiced by Mark Hamill. This version is a former circus performer who accidentally killed his father during a knife-throwing act.
- Tony Zucco appears in the Titans episode "Jason Todd", portrayed by Richard Zeppieri. Robin intercepts Zucco's prison transport with the intent to kill him, only for Zucco to be killed by operatives of the Maroni family.

=== Film ===
Elements of Tony Zucco are incorporated into Batman Forever's depiction of Two-Face (portrayed by Tommy Lee Jones).

=== Video games ===
Tony Zucco appears as a character summon in Scribblenauts Unmasked: A DC Comics Adventure.

=== Miscellaneous ===
Tony Zucco appears in Young Justice #6.

== See also ==
- List of Batman family enemies
