= Alternative versions of Batman =

Interpretations of the DC character

Alternate versions of Batman
- Publisher: DC Comics
- First appearance: Detective Comics #27 (March 1939)
- Created by: Bob Kane; Bill Finger

The character of Batman was created by Bob Kane and Bill Finger, and has been continually published in a variety of DC Comics book titles since its premiere in 1939. There have been several versions of Batman over the years, both as the main hero in the stories as well as several alternative versions.

== Smallville ==
Batman/Bruce Wayne is featured in the Smallville Season 11 digital comic based on the TV series. As a young boy, Bruce Wayne saw his parents gunned down by Joe Chill. This incident changed Bruce's life forever. In 2001, Bruce donned the persona of "Batman", to fight the criminals of Gotham City. Bruce fought criminals on his own for the better part of the next ten years. However, by 2011, Bruce had begun working with the young Barbara Gordon who became known as Nightwing. This same year, Bruce learned that Chill was in Metropolis and went to confront him. His quest for Chill briefly led to Bruce getting into conflict with Superman. However, the two soon joined forces. When they found Chill, Bruce came close to killing him, but Prankster and Mr. Freeze beat him to it, on behalf of Intergang. Prankster also gunned down Superman with kryptonite bullets. Bruce managed to save his life, after which they apprehended Prankster and Freeze.

Bruce was reluctant to join the Watchtower Network but kept finding himself working alongside its agents. Eventually, Bruce gave in and joined, to help them with the Crisis. After the battle against the Monitors, Bruce became a founding member of the Justice League. Furthermore, as Barbara was leaving Earth, Bruce got a new partner in Dick Grayson.

- An villainous version of Bruce appears in the form of Earth-13 Batman resembling the Joker with a patchwork costume.

== The Dark Knight Returns ==
The Batman from Frank Miller's Batman: The Dark Knight Returns and its spin-offs, Batman: The Dark Knight Strikes Again and All Star Batman and Robin the Boy Wonder are vigilantes in a more mature setting home to Miller's own new interpretations of various DC characters.

== Injustice: Gods Among Us ==
In Injustice: Gods Among Us, Batman was originally close friends with Superman (with Superman even asking him to be godfather to his child with Lois Lane) but when Superman was tricked by the Joker into killing Lois and destroying Metropolis, their relationship slowly went from estranged to antagonistic to enemies. Superman begins a new world order where he and the Justice League use brute force and fear to coerce people into following the law, but Batman sees the tyranny in this and opposes Superman's Regime with his Insurgency.

== Batman: White Knight ==
In the reality of Batman: White Knight, Bruce has grown up believing he is a descendant of Edmond Wayne, the founder of Gotham City and Wayne Enterprises. In reality, though, he is actually a descendant of Bakkar, a disgraced former member of the Order of St. Dumas, who murdered Edmond Wayne and assumed his identity. Jean-Paul Valley, a.k.a. Azrael, is actually the real Wayne descendant, which Bruce only learns from Jack Napier right before Jack forces Harley Quinn to kill him as the Joker will not let him kill himself. After helping save the city from the plotting of Neo-Joker to destroy Gotham, Batman hands over the keys to his various Batmobiles to the GCPD Gotham Terrorism Oppression unit and unmasks himself in front of Gordon to earn back his trust after the ordeal.

Batman later turns himself in after incapacitating Azrael in combat for his many unintentional crimes while Batman. During his trial, Bruce and Harleen Quinzel married on her suggestion to keep her from testifying against him, resulting in him becoming stepfather to hers and Jack's children. After 12 years in prison, Bruce helps stop a riot. Upon hearing that someone has stolen a prototype Batsuit and is going around as Batman, he escapes with Jason Todd's help and heads into the city, aided by a sentient AI program of Jack (from a chip placed in his head before). Aided by commissioner Barbara Gordon and Duke Thomas, Bruce encounters the new Batman and finds out more about the plans of Derek Powers who he reveals was responsible for building his Batman gear before taking over Wayne Enterprises. In the end, Bruce teams up with Terry, the GCPD, and the GTO unit led by Dick Grayson into attacking the company headquarters to stop Powers' plan to illegally sell Bat-mechas across the planet. After that succeeds, Bruce is approached by FBI agents Diana Prince and John Stewart, who offer to change his sentence to time served in exchange for his help in investigating reports of a flying teenager in Kansas.

== Batman and Dracula ==
In the three-part "Batman and Dracula" series, after investigating a series of homeless people in Gotham whose throats have been slit, Bruce concludes that the work is the work of a family of vampires led by Dracula himself, who apparently died centuries ago. He was, he is still healthy and fresh and he is back. Batman teams up with Tanya, a former member of Dracula's gang who has now rebelled against him, to find their location. This is where Bruce Wayne is attacked by a vampire and converted into one. In the second part of this comic, Batman finds himself unable to control his vampiric instincts. Having mobilized the rest of the vampires, the Joker takes control of most of the city. In the final battle, Batman cannot stop his thirst and drinks all the Joker's blood. Shocked by what he did, Batman plunges a sharp piece of wood into Joker's heart to secure it so that he does not return as a vampire, and then convinces Commissioner Gordon and Alfred Pennyworth to plunge a piece of wood into his heart as well. Alfred removes the stick from Batman's chest and revives him, but Batman brutally murders Killer Croc and Two-Face. Having rid Gotham City of both vampires and criminals, Batman kills himself by walking into the sunlight and disintegrates into dust.

== Citizen Wayne ==
In Batman: Citizen Wayne, the role of Batman is taken on by Harvey Dent after his whole face has been destroyed by an enemy. Bruce Wayne is a newspaper publisher who is highly critical of Batman and his brutal methods and goes after him when he actually kills the enemy in question, both men dying in the final battle.

== Dark Multiverse ==
In the 2017 "Dark Nights: Metal" event, it is revealed that a Dark Multiverse exists alongside the main DC Multiverse. Each reality in the Dark Multiverse is negative and transient reflection of its existing counterpart, which were intended to be acquired by World Forger who would feed these timelines to his "dragon" Barbatos. However, this balance came to an end when Barbatos escaped his bonds and allowed the rejected timelines to remain in some form of existence. Eventually, Barbatos is released onto the DC universe when Batman is treated with five unique metals, turning him into a portal to the Dark Multiverse, with this portal also allowing Barbatos to summon an army of evil alternate Batmen known as the Dark Knights, led by a God-like Batman, who describe themselves as having been created based on Batman's dark imaginations of what he could do if he possessed the powers of his colleagues.

During the "Dark Nights: Death Metal" storyline, more Dark Multiverse versions of Batman appear.

=== The Batman Who Laughs ===
The Batman Who Laughs is a version of Batman from Earth -22, a dark reflection of the Earth-22. In that reality, the Earth -22 Joker learned of Batman's identity as Bruce Wayne and killed most of Batman's other rogues along with Commissioner Gordon. He then subjected a sizeable population of Gotham's populace to the chemicals that transformed him, subsequently killing several parents in front of their children with the goal of turning them into essentially a combination of himself and Batman. When Batman grappled with the Joker, it resulted in the latter's death as Batman is exposed to a purified form of the chemicals that gradually turned him into a new Joker, the process proving irreversible by the time Batman discovered what was happening to him. The Batman who Laughs proceeded to take over Earth-22, killing off most of his allies and turning Damian into a mini-Joker. The Batman Who Laughs seems to be the de facto leader or second-in-command of Barbatos' Dark Knights and recruited the other members.

=== Red Death ===
The Red Death is a version of Batman from Earth-52, originally an aged man who broke after the deaths of Dick Grayson, Jason Todd, Tim Drake, and Damian Wayne. Believing he has a chance to prevent the loss of more loved ones, Bruce decides he needs the Flash's Speed Force to achieve this and equips himself with the Rogues' equipment to capture the Flash. He knocks Barry out and ties him to the Batmobile, which has a machine created from reverse-engineering the Cosmic Treadmill attached to it. Using this machine against Barry's wishes, Bruce drove straight into the Speed Force while absorbing Barry in the process. Scarred by the ordeal, he developed a split personality created from residual traces of Barry's mind. The newly born Red Death tests his new powers but realizes he cannot stop his Earth from its destruction until he is recruited by The Batman Who Laughs, who promises him a new Earth to live upon. After entering Prime-Earth, the Red Death arrives in Central City and is confronted by Iris West and Wally West, during which he uses his powers to slow Wally and age them both. The Flash confronts the Red Death, and Doctor Fate saves Barry before the latter can attack. The Red Death proclaims that he will save Central City and make it his new home. After Barry is transported to a cave beneath Central City, the Red Death arrives and reveals several Flashmobiles and chases after Barry.

In Dark Knights Rising: The Wild Hunt, the Red Death ceases to exist after being exposed by an energy wave from the release of a newly born universe. Barry Allen is separated from Bruce Wayne, but consumed by the energy shortly afterward.

During the Dark Nights: Death Metal storyline, the Batman Who Laughs resurrects the Red Death after becoming the Darkest Knight.

=== Murder Machine ===
The Murder Machine is a version of Batman from Earth -44, a dark reflection of the Earth-44. Distraught from having lost Alfred, Batman requested Cyborg to help him finish the Alfred Protocol, an A.I. version of Alfred. But the Alfred Protocol malfunctioned upon activation and began to multiply and kill all of Batman's enemies. Bruce pleaded with Cyborg to help find a way to fix it, but the latter refused. The Alfred Protocol fused with Bruce, becoming the Murder Machine, and killed Cyborg. After being recruited by the Batman Who Laughs, the Murder Machine arrives on Prime-Earth with the other Dark Knights. He proceeds to the Justice League Watchtower and confronts Cyborg. After Cyborg is incapacitated by the other Dark Knights, the Murder Machine infects and converts the Watchtower as the Dark Knights' new base of operations.

=== Dawnbreaker ===
The Dawnbreaker is a version of Batman from Earth -32, a dark reflection of the Earth-32 where Batman became a Green Lantern. When Earth -32 Bruce lost his parents to Joe Chill, he is chosen by a Green Lantern power ring to become a Green Lantern. Bruce's will overrides the ring's ban on lethal force and corrupts it, enabling him to use it to kill Chill and various criminals. After Bruce killed Gordon when eventually confronted, he wipes out the Green Lantern Corps and the Guardians of the Universe when they confront him. Bruce then entered his giant Green Lantern Power Battery and exits with a new outfit and moniker, the Dawnbreaker. However, he finds that his Earth has begun to collapse and he is met by the Batman Who Laughs who, after recruiting the Red Death and the Murder Machine, recruits Dawnbreaker, promising him a new world to shroud in darkness. After arriving on Earth-0, Dawnbreaker heads to Coast City where he is confronted by Hal Jordan. Dawnbreaker tries to consume Jordan in a 'blackout' but the latter is rescued by Doctor Fate. With Green Lantern gone, Dawnbreaker takes control of Coast City. Dawnbreaker confronts Jordan in a blacked out cave underneath Coast City, claiming that the Green Lantern oath is worthless in his cave.

=== Drowned ===
The Drowned is a version of Batman from Earth -11, a dark reflection of the reversed-gender Earth-11. Originally known as Batwoman, Bryce Wayne was in a relationship with Sylvester Kyle (Earth-11's male version of Selina Kyle) until he was killed by a metahuman. A revenge-driven Bryce spent 18 months hunting down every rogue metahuman before Aquawoman and the Atlanteans emerged from their self-imposed exile. While Aquawoman claimed her people came in peace, a skeptical Bryce declared war on Atlantis with the Atlanteans flooding Gotham in retaliation when their queen was killed. Bryce survived the disaster by surgically altering herself with the DNA of marine life, giving her the ability to breathe underwater, a healing factor, and water manipulation. She also created an army of sea monsters called Dead Waters to fight for her. Donning a new attire, Bryce called herself The Drowned and successfully conquered Atlantis at the cost of flooding every city. After seeing her signal being lit, the Drowned met the Batman Who Laughs, who recruits her as a Dark Knight.

=== Merciless ===
The Merciless is a version of Batman from Earth -12. Here Batman is in a relationship with Wonder Woman. Having killed Ares in a fit of rage when Ares presumably kills Wonder Woman, the Earth -12 Batman acquired Ares's helmet and assumed that he can channel its power to war with justice and mercy rather than ruthless brutality. But it corrupted him and the 'Merciless' Batman ended up killing Wonder Woman (who had actually just been knocked out) while eliminating all his enemies.

=== Devastator ===
The Devastator is a version of Batman from Earth -1, a dark reflection of Earth-1. When Superman turned evil and kills friend and foe alike along with Lois, the Earth-1 Batman injected himself with an engineered version of the Doomsday virus to stop Superman at the cost of his humanity as he transformed into a Doomsday-like monster. Despite his victory, the Devastator still feels remorse for not being able to protect Metropolis from Superman's wrath. The Batman Who Laughs offers The Devastator a second chance at saving those whom he feels are blindly inspired by Superman. Bruce infects the Earth-0 Lois Lane, Supergirl, and all of Metropolis with the Doomsday virus as he views it as the only way to protect them from Superman's strength and false prophecies.

=== Barbatos ===
Barbatos is a hooded, god-like being in the Dark Multiverse. Barbatos had previously visited Prime-Earth in the DC Multiverse and founded the Tribe of Judas, which would later become the Court of Owls. Sometime before returning (either willingly or not) to the Dark Multiverse, Barbatos encountered Hawkman and was hit by his mace. Barbatos tried to return to the multiverse but the events of Final Crisis prevented him from doing so. However, after witnessing Bruce Wayne/Batman being sent back in time by Darkseid's Omega Beams, Barbatos realised the similarities between his and Bruce's Bat emblems and believed he could use him as a doorway. Barbatos' followers manipulated events in order for Bruce to be injected with four out of the five metals needed to create the doorway, and after the fifth was injected in the present day, Barbatos was able to transport himself and the Dark Knights to Prime-Earth to conquer it.

=== Other versions from the Dark Multiverse ===
- Bathomet is a Cthulhu-like Batman from an unknown part of the Dark Multiverse.
- Batmage is an evil sorcerer version of Batman from an unknown part of the Dark Multiverse.
- Batmanosaurus Rex (also called B-Rex) is a version of Batman from an unknown part of the Dark Multiverse. It is the result of Batman uploading his mind into the robotic Tyrannosaurus that he has in the Batcave after the Batcave collapsed.
- Castle Bat is a version of Batman from an unknown part of the Dark Multiverse who sacrificed Damian Wayne as part of a ritual that would merge his soul with Gotham City enabling him to easily hunt down every villain. The Batman Who Laughs uses him as a headquarters for the Dark Knights.
- Darkfather is a Batman from an unknown part of the Dark Multiverse who defeated Darkseid and acquired his powers. After mastering the Anti-Life Equation, Darkfather turned the Parademons of Apokolips into his Pararobins.
- Dr. Arkham is a Batman from an unknown part of the Dark Multiverse who left the vigilante business and took part in performing experiments on humans.
- Batmanhattan is a Batman from an unknown part of the Dark Multiverse who harnessed the powers of Doctor Manhattan. The Batman Who Laughs would later lobotomize Batmanhattan and then transplant his brain into his body, becoming the Darkest Knight.
- Batom is a Batman from an unknown part of the Dark Multiverse who sports the same Bio-Belt as Atom.
- Batmobeast is a version of Batman from an unknown part of the Dark Multiverse whose consciousness was uploaded into a monster truck after every digital system was destroyed by the people of his Earth.
- Robin King is a child version of Bruce Wayne from an unknown part of the Dark Multiverse who developed mass-murdering tendencies.
- Baby Batman is a baby version of Batman from an unknown part of the Dark Multiverse who downloaded his mind into an infantile artificial body.
- Grim Knight is a Batman from an unknown part of the Dark Multiverse who wields firearms.

== DC Bombshells ==
In the opening of the DC Bombshells continuity set during World War II, Bruce's parents are saved from Joe Chill's attack thanks to the baseball superheroine known as Batwoman. While Batman does not exist in this continuity, Kate Kane does borrow a number of elements from the main version, such as inspiring younger heroines to follow in her steps as Batgirls and losing a child named Jason. In the book's conclusion that takes place 15 years into the future, a grown up Bruce Wayne becomes Batman (not out of tragedy but out of inspiration by the Bombshells) and is trained by the older Catwoman to herald in the new age of superheroes.

== Earth-Two ==
The original iteration of the superhero Batman in 1939, on a variant cover of Detective Comics #1000 (March 2019), based on the cover art of Detective Comics #27 (1939) by the character's co-creator Bob Kane. Art by Alex Ross.

The Batman of Earth-Two is an alternate version of the superhero Batman. The character was introduced after DC Comics created Earth-Two, a parallel world that was retroactively established as the home of characters whose adventures had been published in the Golden Age of Comic Books. This provided justification within the fictional world of Batman stories for DC Comics publishing Batman comic books that disregarded the character's Golden Age stories, as Batman had been presented as a single ongoing incarnation of the character since his earliest stories were published.

=== Origin ===
Batman's origin and history is similar to the Earth-One version of the character, but does not exist in a floating timeline. For example, the Batman makes his debut in 1939, meets Robin, Joker, Catwoman, and Clayface at various points in 1940, Penguin in 1941, Two-Face in 1942, etc. These dates reflect the publishing dates of the original stories, rather than taking the Earth-One and Modern Age approach of keeping the characters eternally youthful.

The abilities of the Earth-Two Batman are similar to his Earth-One counterpart. Like his Robin, Batman had his aging rate reduced after the JSA's fight with Ian Karkull. Unlike his Earth-One counterpart, the Earth-Two Batman used a gun during his early adventures.

At the dawn of the Silver Age of comics, DC Comics decided to reintroduce several of their Golden Age superheroes, all of whom had ceased publication several years earlier. Superman, Wonder Woman and Batman, having been continuously published since their Golden Age introductions, were not given any reimaginings (although much about the mythos of each had evolved slowly over the years). It was later revealed that the current heroes live on a parallel world to the Golden Age heroes: The newer Silver Age heroes are on Earth-One, while the Golden Age characters reside on Earth-Two.

The Earth-Two Wayne made several different character evolutions from the mainstream Batman, as the Earth-Two Bruce accepts his one-time adversary Catwoman as his true love and shares his secret identity with her after her memory is restored of her real life. The Earth-Two Wayne and Catwoman later marry, after she had voluntarily served prison time for her crimes. They have a daughter, Helena Wayne (also known as the Huntress), and the family resides at Wayne Manor where Bruce devotes himself and his fortune to philanthropy. By the early 1960s, Wayne has retired as Batman, with Robin taking over crimefighting in Gotham City. Bruce's years of civic volunteerism results in him being named to replace the retiring James Gordon as Police Commissioner.

Adventure Comics #462 (1979), featuring the death of Batman. Cover art by Jim Aparo.

Bruce is brought out of retirement for one last mission as Batman when a thief named Bill Jensen is magically empowered by a sorcerer named Frederick Vaux and attacks Gotham City. Already dying of cancer caused by years of smoking, Batman decides to fight to the death against Jensen, stopping his threat at the cost of his life. In the aftermath of the battle, the public learns that Wayne was Batman. However, Doctor Fate erases the public's memories to protect the secret identities of Robin and Huntress, making them believe that Bruce died of his cancer on the same day that Batman died.

== Just Imagine ==
Just Imagine... is a series of comics created by Stan Lee (the co-creator of several Marvel Comics characters), with reimaginings of various DC characters. In this continuity, Wayne Williams is framed for a crime he did not commit, works his way into getting out of prison, and becomes a mysterious wrestler known as Batman to fund a career as a vigilante using complex equipment to avenge himself against the criminals who originally framed him.

== Kingdom Come ==
The Kingdom Come limited series depicts a Batman who, ravaged by years of fighting crime, uses an exoskeleton to keep himself together and keeps the peace on the streets of Gotham using remote-controlled robots. He is late middle-aged and his secret identity has become public knowledge.

== Superman: American Alien ==
In Superman: American Alien, a 2016 comic that shows an alternate retelling of Superman's origin, Bruce Wayne is training under Ra's al Ghul when he is told about someone posing as him at a birthday party thrown for him, causing Bruce to become interested in this person. Years later, having been Batman for a while, he finds out that the same person, revealed to be Clark Kent, is a reporter who spoke to Bruce's new ward Dick Grayson. Donning his costume, Bruce confronts Clark but is quickly overpowered, and is shocked when none of his equipment harms Clark. Clark finds out Bruce's identity by taking his mask and cape, and Bruce escapes. He seemingly leaves behind Clark's recording of his conversation with Dick, and Clark does not reveal Bruce's double life to the public. Bruce's cape later becomes part of Clark's prototype costume as he first begins his crime fighting career.

== Superman: Red Son ==
In the comic Superman: Red Son, Batman was an anarchistic terrorist born under the cruel and repressive regime of Joseph Stalin, aiming to overthrow the Russian government and avenge the death of his parents. Although Batman conducted many secret attacks against the government, he accepted Luthor's offer and, as Luthor planned, decided to focus on destroying Superman, the leader of USSR. Knowing Kal-El's greatest weakness, he took his mistress, Wonder Woman, hostage, before using artificial solar radiation to weaken Superman during their confrontation. It works to some extent, but Wonder Woman escapes from the trap and saves Superman's life by changing the direction of the radiation emitters. Batman, knowing that he will be lobotomized into one of Superman’d cyborg foot soldiers, eventually activates the small bomb he hid in his belt and committed suicide. Despite his demise, he was further recognized as a martyr by more dissidents of Superman’s reign.

== DC X Sonic the Hedgehog ==
In the intercompany crossover DC X Sonic the Hedgehog, Batman is among the Justice League members who team up with Sonic and his friends to stop Darkseid and his forces from obtaining the Chaos Emeralds. He pairs up with Shadow, whom Batman sympathizes with over personal losses.

== Absolute Batman ==
Set on the alternate reality of Alpha World, DC's Absolute Universe imprint is a separate continuity where superheroes are perceived as underdogs by the general public. This is due to the world being influenced by Darkseid's energy. This portrayal of Batman has his most iconic elements removed: his wealth, his butler, and his Batcave, leaving him without his greatest advantages.

In this timeline, Bruce Wayne was raised on Crime Alley in Gotham City in relative poverty, whose father, Thomas Wayne, is murdered at a random shooting at a zoo. This version grows up to be a blue collar engineer, who is childhood friends with many of his enemies in the main universe, being Waylon Jones, Harvey Dent, Edward Nigma, Oswald Cobblepot, and his girlfriend Selina Kyle. As Batman, he trains himself and self-designs his equipment and armor, his most notable tool being his large Bat-symbol on his chest which doubles as the hilt of an axe. While still having a rule against killing, he is much more brutal in his war against corruption, even using a gun at one time, though he modified it to shoot tiny non-lethal Bat projectiles. Near the beginning of his crusade, he is confronted by MI6 agent, Alfred Pennyworth, who is initially ordered to take him down, but later becomes an ally. His foes in this reality are the ones with the money and resources, such as the Joker, a stoic and dangerous man who is one of the richest men in the world.

== Batman One Million ==
The Batman of the far future of the 853rd century in the DC One Million mini-series written by Grant Morrison. His name is unknown; having been born on Pluto, he was one of thousands of children forced to watch his parents murdered by the terrorist leader Xauron. As an adult, he became the latest of the Batman Legacy, turning Pluto into a prison world and acting as its warden, also becoming a member of Justice League Alpha. Over the course of the story, he works with the present day Batman in finding a way to stop Starman's genocidal plans.

== See also ==
- List of Batman comics
- List of Batman video games
- List of DC Multiverse worlds
- Batman (franchise)
- Publication history of DC Comics crossover events
- All-Star Squadron
- America vs. The Justice Society — A miniseries in which Batman (through his diary, discovered post-mortem) accuses the JSA of committing treason during World War II
- Batman
- Golden Age Robin
- Golden Age Catwoman
- Huntress (Helena Wayne)
- Multiverse (DC Comics)
- Superman of Earth-Two
- Wonder Woman of Earth-Two
