= The Batman vs. Dracula =

2005 animated superhero film

- Release poster after 2016
- Directed by: Michael Goguen
- Written by: Duane Capizzi
- Based on: Batman by: Bob Kane; Bill Finger Dracula by Bram Stoker
- Produced by: Jeff Matsuda; Linda M. Steiner
- Starring: Rino Romano; Peter Stormare; Tara Strong; Tom Kenny; Kevin Michael Richardson; Alastair Duncan
- Edited by: Margaret Hou
- Music by: Thomas Chase Jones
- Production companies: DC Comics; Warner Bros. Animation; Warner Bros. Family Entertainment
- Distributed by: Warner Home Video
- Release dates: October 18, 2005 (DVD); October 22, 2005 (TV)
- Running time: 84 minutes
- Country: United States
- Language: English

The Batman vs. Dracula is a 2005 American direct-to-video animated superhero-horror film based on The Batman television series. The film is a crossover inspired by the 1897 horror novel Dracula and loosely based on the Elseworlds story Batman & Dracula: Red Rain by DC comics. The film was released to DVD on October 18, 2005, and made its television debut on Cartoon Network's Toonami block on October 22. In the film, the Batman struggles to save Gotham City from his most challenging foe yet: the legendary vampire lord Count Dracula, who hatches a plot with his two new henchmen, Penguin and Joker, to enslave the city and create an army of vampires. It was released on DVD as a companion to the live action Batman Begins.

== Plot ==
The Joker and the Penguin break out of Arkham, racing to find money in a crypt at Gotham Cemetery. Joker is quickly intercepted by The Batman and is electrocuted by his super-charged joy buzzers and falls into a river, seemingly killing him. Penguin enters the cemetery, and the crypt he thinks where the treasure is hidden, and injures his hand, which drips blood onto a corpse, inadvertently bringing it to life; it is none other than the vampire king himself, Count Dracula, his body having been moved to Gotham City after his "death" in Transylvania. Penguin is spared from being bitten thanks to a watchman, whom Dracula bites instead; once the watchman revives as a vampire, Dracula hypnotizes Penguin into serving him as his daytime sentinel.

One night, Batman witnesses a vampire attack but decides to put the incident at the back of his mind and, as Bruce Wayne, proceeds to host a corporate party at his manor. Dracula arrives, disguised as cultural anthropologist Dr. Alucard, claiming to be visiting to study Batman, and takes an interest in Vicki Vale, a reporter who is interviewing and dating Bruce. After failing to bite Bruce to quench his thirst, Dracula bites a waiter instead; the new vampire scares Bruce's butler Alfred. Bruce immediately deduces "Alucard" is Dracula, and the disappearances of Gotham citizens, who have been dubbed "Lost Ones" by the media, are because they are being turned into vampires and spreading like a plague. The Batman is determined to battle Dracula without harming the Lost Ones, seeking ways to cure them. Due to eyewitness reports of a bat-like figure during the attacks, it is mistakenly reported that Batman is the culprit. When Batman goes to Gotham Cemetery to look for Dracula's nest, he is chased down by a SWAT unit, all of whose members are taken by Dracula as they chase him back into the city. During a fight with Batman, Dracula offers to let him join his conquest of Gotham; Batman refuses. Just as Dracula has Batman at his mercy, the sun rises, and Dracula is forced to retreat, vowing to kill Batman for rejecting his offer.

At the cemetery, Joker reappears, still alive, and confronts Penguin, believing he has found the treasure, and chases him into Dracula's tomb. Despite Penguin's warning not to open Dracula's coffin, Joker ends up as another one of Dracula's slaves, much to Penguin's horror. Joker attacks a blood bank for sustenance, leading to his capture by Batman. While Batman attempts to concoct an antidote from the Joker's infected cellular structure, Alfred discovers that Dracula once had a vampire bride, Carmilla Karnstein, who was killed by sunlight. During his research, Bruce misses a date with Vicki, who Dracula soon kidnaps. Finally, Batman cures the Joker of his vampirism and ascertains the location of Dracula's lair in Gotham Cemetery before returning him to Arkham. He then proceeds to mass-produce the vaccine.

Dracula attempts to sacrifice Vicki's soul to reanimate Carmilla. Upon learning Vicki has been kidnapped, Batman rushes to Dracula's lair with his anti-vampirism vaccine and arsenal of weapons, defeating and curing all the "Lost Ones" that attack him in the catacombs beneath Gotham Cemetery. Batman then frees Vicki, disrupting the reanimation ritual. Dracula sends the Penguin to recapture Vicki while he fights Batman, who lures Dracula into the Batcave, where Batman would have the advantage over the vampire. In an attempt to aid his master, Alfred injects Dracula with the vaccine, but it cannot cure a natural vampire. When Dracula resumes his pursuit, Batman incinerates him with his prototype solar-energy-storing machine, killing him and reducing him to a pile of ashes and bones, with his remains secured by Alfred. While chasing Vicki, Penguin is freed from Dracula's control and finally finds the hidden treasure that caused all the trouble in the first place; he is immediately arrested and blamed for Dracula's kidnappings, causing the media to think he was forcing people to find the treasure. Batman is cleared of all charges and resumes protecting Gotham.

== Voice cast ==
- Rino Romano as Bruce Wayne / The Batman
- Peter Stormare as Count Dracula
- Tara Strong as Vicki Vale
- Tom Kenny as Oswald Cobblepot / Penguin
- Kevin Michael Richardson as Joker
- Alastair Duncan as Alfred Pennyworth

Additional voices were provided by Jeff Bennett, Richard Green, Robin Atkin Downes, Neil Ross, and James Sie.

== Prior Batman/Dracula crossovers ==
- In the Elseworlds comic book Batman & Dracula: Red Rain by Doug Moench, Kelley Jones, and Malcolm Jones III, Batman encounters Dracula and becomes a vampire to defeat him.
- Batman fought Dracula in the films Batman Dracula and Batman Fights Dracula, but neither of these movies was authorized by DC Comics.

=== The Batman Strikes #15: "The Lost Ones" ===
This moody tale, which guest stars the Penguin, serves as a companion piece to The Batman vs. Dracula, and introduces Count Dracula into Gotham City.

Even though the Penguin is under Dracula's control, this does not keep him from tending to his own business. He exploits the missing Gothamites/the Lost Ones by kidnapping citizens and holding them for ransom. He is aided by the Kabuki Twins.

As the issue comes to a close, Batman is about to apprehend the Penguin when he is rescued by Dracula. Dracula does not appreciate the exploitation of his activity and makes sure to keep the Penguin on a tighter leash.

== Release ==
The film was released on DVD on October 18, 2005, and was broadcast on Cartoon Network four days later. The DVD included the featurette Science vs. Superstition, an interactive Gotham City map containing behind-the-scenes segments, and Voices in Close-Up, featuring footage from the voice-recording sessions.

== Reception ==
Retrospective reception has been mixed. Film critic Kim Newman praised the film's spooky action and Duane Capizzi's integration of Batman's villains into a Dracula story, as well as Peter Stormare's performance as Dracula, but criticised the character designs inherited from The Batman television series.

Casey Burchby of DVD Talk regarded the film as entertaining, although he considered its later pairing with The Batman Superman Movie an awkward double feature.

== Cancelled sequel ==
A sequel titled The Batman vs. Hush that featured Hush as the main villain along with the Joker, the Penguin, the Riddler, Catwoman, and Clayface was planned for a long time, but the film ended up being scrapped. Before its cancellation, producer Alan Burnett had hopes of making one or two more DTV movies based on The Batman.
