= Huntress (Helena Wayne) =

The Huntress
- Huntress (Helena Wayne). art by Joe Staton.

Publication information
- Publisher: DC Comics
- First appearance: DC Super Stars #17 (November/December 1977)
- Created by: Paul Levitz; Joe Staton; Joe Orlando; Bob Layton

In-story information
- Alter ego: Helena Wayne
- Species: Human
- Place of origin: Earth-Two
- Team affiliations: Batman Family; Infinity, Inc. Justice Society of America; Justice League
- Partnerships: Catwoman; Batman; Robin (Dick Grayson); Power Girl
- Notable aliases: Helena Kyle, Selina Wayne, Robin, Batwoman,Mara Chen
- Abilities: Highly skilled gymnast, martial artist, and markswoman; Skilled criminologist and thief; Advance knowledge of law

The Huntress, also known as Helena Wayne, is a superheroine appearing in American comic books published by DC Comics. The character is the daughter of the Batman and Catwoman (Selina Kyle) of an alternate universe established in the early 1960s and referred to as "Earth-Two", where the Golden Age stories took place. A modern-day predecessor (and retroactive namesake) of Helena Wayne as Huntress with no blood-relation to Batman or Catwoman, Helena Bertinelli, was additionally co-created by the character's co-creator Joe Staton in 1989, originally intended as a reinvention of the character following the events of Crisis on Infinite Earths, before being retconned as different characters.

Actress Ashley Scott portrayed Helena Kyle / The Huntress in the 2002 television series Birds of Prey and reprised her role in the Arrowverse crossover "Crisis on Infinite Earths".

== Publication history ==
Helena's debut on the cover of DC Super Stars #17. Art by Joe Staton.

The Huntress was created as a response to All Star Comics inker Bob Layton's suggestion that a revamped Earth-Two Batgirl be added to the lineup of the Justice Society of America. Penciller Joe Staton recounted how the character was designed:

After Paul [Levitz, All Star Comics writer] had described the origin to me, I worked up sketches combining elements of Catwoman and Batman, and went in see Joe [Orlando, editor]. The short version is that Joe and I had a fine meeting, featuring Vinnie Colletta in his role as art director snoring away at full volume on the couch in the back of the room. Joe touched up the bat-elements in my original sketch, particularly the cape, giving it the scallops, and he made the belt emblem a bit more bat-like. Joe opened up his sketchpad and used my sketch as the main element in the cover design for DC Super-Stars, and I went home to pencil the final cover.

Staton also admitted that the character's costume was heavily inspired by the Black Cat. The title Huntress was borrowed from "relatively obscure Golden Age villainess" Paula Brooks. Helena's first appearance was in DC Super Stars #17 (November/December 1977), which told her origin, and then All Star Comics #69 (December 1977), which came out the same day, and revealed her existence to the Justice Society of America. She appeared in Batman Family #17-20 when it expanded into the Dollar Comics format for its last few issues. The bulk of her solo stories appeared as backup features in issues of Wonder Woman beginning with issue #271 (September 1980). These stories, almost all of which were written by Levitz and pencilled by Staton, tended to a noir style, with the Huntress typically combating street-level crime rather than costumed supervillains.

Following the character's death and erasure from history in Crisis on Infinite Earths #12 (March 1986), DC created a new Huntress (Helena Bertinelli) to serve as her successor.

Following 52 (2007), DC Comics superheroes' fictional world was newly established as a collection of 52 parallel-world "universes". An alternate rebooted version of the Helena Wayne character now resides on post-Crisis Earth-2 and has appeared in Justice Society of America (vol. 3) in issues set on the parallel world of Earth-2.

A new Helena Wayne is reintroduced following DC's Flashpoint (2011) crossover in The New 52 reboot as part of a storyline where she and Power Girl are refugees from the world featured in the comic book Earth 2 (2012–2015), taking the name Helena Bertinelli as her alias on Earth 1. Together they headline the series Worlds' Finest. The character is later featured in the storyline of the multiverse crossover event Convergence and the Earth 2 follow-up series Earth 2: Society (2015–2017), in which she takes over her father's title as Batman. She isn't seen again following Doomsday Clock (2017–2019) which reversed some of the Flashpoint event's changes to the timeline.

Following the Dark Nights: Metal crossover, another incarnation of Helena Wayne is introduced by Geoff Johns as Batman and Catwoman's time travelling daughter from the future in the pages of The New Golden Age (2022–2024) and Justice Society of America (vol. 4) (2023–2024), in which she supports the JSA to defeat Per Degaton but becomes stranded in the past after her future timeline is erased. She supports the team by helping them recruit villains to their ranks who became heroes, hoping to accelerate their paths to reform. In the series' conclusion, she travels with the Legion of Super-Heroes to the 31st century, where she joins that era's incarnation of the Justice Society.

== Fictional character biography ==
Several iterations of the character exist throughout the DC Multiverse, typically in either the original Earth-Two reality or alternate versions of the reality.

=== Original Earth-Two ===
Helena was born in 1957 to Bruce Wayne and Selina Kyle Wayne, and grew up enjoying the benefits of being in a wealthy household. As a youth, she enjoyed a thorough education, as well as being trained by her parents, Batman and Catwoman, to become a super-athlete. As a young girl she was amazed to learn that her father was the Batman and embraced Dick Grayson as her older brother. She also looked up to Alfred Pennyworth as a second father. After Yale College and Yale Law School, she joined the law firm of Cranston and Grayson, one of whose partners was Dick Grayson, alias Robin. In 1976, criminal Silky Cernak blackmailed his old boss Selina Kyle into resuming action once again as Catwoman, an act which eventually led to her death. Helena, deciding to bring Cernak to justice, created a costume for herself, fashioned some weapons from her parents' equipment (including her eventual trademark weapon, a crossbow), and set out to bring him in. After accomplishing this, Helena decided to continue to fight crime, under the code name "the Huntress".

After her mother's death, Helena moved out of Wayne Manor and into a Gotham City apartment. She soon found herself involved with the Justice Society of America (her father's old team) and formally joined the group in All Star Comics #72. Helena was also briefly associated with the superhero group Infinity, Inc., a team made up of second-generation superheroes, mostly the children of JSA members.

Helena also struck up a friendship with fellow new superheroine Power Girl, who was also a part of both Infinity Inc. and the JSA. In addition to Power Girl, Helena frequently worked with Robin and with a new hero named Blackwing. Some of her foes were the Thinker, Joker, Lion-Mane (one of her mother's embittered former minions), Karnage, Boa, and the Earthworm. Her lover for a time was Gotham District Attorney Harry Sims. Despite the fact that she proposed a partnership ("I nail'em, you jail'em"), their relationship grew difficult in that he knew of her secret identity and was constantly worrying about her safety. She briefly flirted with Robin who, cited her father's choice in looking for a wife, told her that a normal man would not be able to satisfy her. She made several visits to Earth-One. Her first was in Batman Family #17, where she met the Earth-One Batman, Robin, Batgirl, and Batwoman, and fought the Earth-One Catwoman, Poison Ivy and Madame Zodiac. Seeing in him her father returned to her, she took to calling the Earth-One Batman her "Uncle Bruce", and built a familial relationship with him. As a member of the Justice Society, she participated in several of the annual JLA/JSA meetings, most of which took place on Earth-One. She also participated in the battle against the Adjudicator as part of the female force of multiple Earths led by the Earth-One Wonder Woman. Other heroines involved in this adventure included Zatanna, Supergirl, Phantom Lady, Madame Xanadu, Power Girl, Black Canary, Wonder Girl, Raven, and Starfire.

Despite the fact that she did love her mother and became the Huntress to avenge her death, she secretly feared that she might follow in her mother's footsteps. Either fighting a demonic version of her mother in a drug-induced haze or fighting her mother's Earth-One counterpart (who had never reformed), Helena had a difficult time coming to grips with her mother's criminal career, even going so far as to seek therapy. Looking at her mother's Earth-One counterpart, she secretly hoped that one day that the Earth-One Catwoman would reform.

==== Crisis on Infinite Earths and Infinite Crisis ====
In Crisis on Infinite Earths, Huntress participates in the battle to save all creation from the Anti-Monitor. The Anti-Monitor succeeds in destroying most of the multiverse, with the remaining universes being merged into a single universe. Huntress survives this process, but is traumatized to learn that Earth-Two was erased. Huntress and the Earth-Two Robin are killed while trying to save children from the Anti-Monitor's shadow demons.

Following the events of Infinite Crisis and 52, Earth-Two and Huntress are restored. In Justice Society of America (vol. 3) Annual #1, Power Girl is sent to Earth-2 by Gog. There, she is discovered by the Huntress who recognizes her as the Power Girl from their world who went missing after the first Crisis. In this new Earth-2, the citizens remember having been the only Earth in existence following the Crisis. The Huntress re-initiates Power Girl into Justice Society Infinity brings her up to speed on her life. Following the death of Alfred, Huntress has become more estranged from her friends; Robin serves in Batman's place as a global protector, while Huntress protects the streets of Gotham.

=== Earth-2 (New 52) ===
- First appearance: Huntress (2011) #1
- Created by: Paul Levitz; Marcus To; John Dell
- Teams: Wonders of the World; Batman Family; Furies of Apokolips
- Aliases: Robin; Huntress; Batman; Helena Bertinelli; Famine

A different version of the Helena Wayne incarnation of the Huntress returns in the wake of DC's The New 52 relaunch with a six-issue Huntress miniseries that was released in October 2011. Alongside Power Girl, she later starred in a revival of the Worlds' Finest series, written by Paul Levitz and drawn by George Pérez and Kevin Maguire.

This variant of Helena Wayne is the daughter of Batman and Catwoman of Earth 2, having once served under the moniker of Robin and was frequently partnered with Power Girl. When Apokoliptian forces attacked Earth 2, both of her parents were killed and circumstance forced herself and Power Girl to end up in Prime Earth (the main universe). The pair took new identities, Wayne having appropriated the "Helena Bertinelli" identity. Having teamed up with Prime Earth's version of Batman and Robin (Damian Wayne) various of times as well as battled DeSaad, Power Girl and Helena eventually discovered a way back to their reality and worked alongside a new version of Batman, revealed to be her paternal grandfather Thomas Wayne. Helena was captured by DeSaad and subsequently brained into Famine, a new addition to the Female Furies. Eventually, her friends and allies returned her to human form and left Earth-2 before it was destroyed with other survivors. After the creation of a new version of Earth, Helena would work alongside the third new Batman, the Earth-2 version of Dick Grayson. She helps him investigate the usage of a terraformer and helps him stop Doctor Impossible (Earth-2's version of Jimmy Olsen) from turning the newly created Earth into a Mother Box. Later, she also aids Batman in battle with Ultra-Humanite as he learns his son had survived. Crippled, Grayson instead adopts the codename "Oracle" while Helena succeeds him as the new Batman and John Grayson as her protege and Robin.

=== New Golden Age ===
- First appearance: Stargirl Spring Break Special #1 (July, 2021)
- Created by: Geoff Johns; Todd Nauck
- Teams: Justice Society of America; Justice Society (31st Century)
- Abilities: Similar abilities to her Earth-Two version.

A version of the character is reintroduced in the storyline The New Golden Age, which deals with never-before-seen characters being returned to history after having been removed from existence. In a future scene, a young Helena is being stalked by "The Stranger". Late one night, Helena spots Batman in her home and stabs him, only for him to reveal himself as her father Bruce. Her mother Selena is furious, knowing that this will start Helena down the tragic road taken by various Robins in the past. Because of this, Bruce retired from being Batman. Further in the future still when Bruce is murdered, an adult Helena swears vengeance, becoming Huntress.

Huntress is later transported to the present day, where she encounters Doctor Fate, Deadman, and Detective Chimp. After telling them about what happened in her future, Doctor Fate takes Huntress to the Justice Society of America while Detective Chimp and Deadman take the snow globe she had to Madame Xanadu to get answers. Xanadu explains that the snow globe is keeping Huntress alive and contains the Flashpoint universe within it. Once Per Degaton is defeated and imprisoned in the snow globe, the possible future that Huntress comes from disappears, though she remains alive. After Huntress and the JSA resolve a situation with the visiting Legion of Super-Heroes, Helena accepts the Legion's offer to relocate to their 31st century, where she becomes a member of that era's JSA.

== Skills and abilities ==
Trained to be at her mental and physical peak since a young age, Huntress possess a blend of skills derived from both Batman and Catwoman; an Olympic-level athlete, Huntress is a master of many forms of unarmed and armed combat disciplines, a capable criminologist, and has knowledge of techniques used by criminals such as lockpicking. She also advance knowledge of the law, particularly with public interest law. Among her arsenal of gadgetry includes a crossbow, daggers, and other items within her utility belt or bag similar to her father's own.

== Other versions ==
- Helena Kyle appears in the mainstream universe as the daughter of Selina Kyle, though her father is unknown. Selina ultimately puts Helena up for adoption under Batman's arrangement for fear she would be unable to protect her. A month after Helena is placed with a new family, Catwoman asks Zatanna to erase her memories of Helena and to make her stop thinking of herself as a heroine. Zatanna refuses, because such an act would be cruel to both mother and daughter and because Selina was already on the path to becoming a heroine on her own.
- In the 2016–2019 run of Batman penned by Tom King as part of the DC Rebirth era, Selina and Bruce reconnected and fell in love once more, with the two almost marrying. In the possible futures of the story called "Last Rites" (in Batman (vol. 3) Annual #2) and the series Batman/Catwoman, Selina falls pregnant with Bruce's child whom they name Helena. After Bruce's death in a flash-forward she helps her widowed mother come to terms with it and ends up becoming the new Batwoman. Helena mentioned to her mother that she is currently dating a female doctor.

== Collected editions ==
Title	Material collected	Publication date	ISBN
Huntress: Darknight Daughter	DC Super-Stars #17; Batman Family #18-20; the Huntress back-up stories from Wonder Woman #271-287, 289–290, 294–295	December 2006	1-4012-0913-0
The Huntress: Origins	DC Super-Stars #17; Batman Family #18-20; the Huntress back-up stories from Wonder Woman #271-287, 289–290, 294–295	January 2020	ISBN 978-1-77950072-4
Huntress: Crossbow at the Crossroads	Huntress (vol. 3) #1–6	October 2012	1-4012-3733-9

== In other media ==
=== Television ===
- Helena Wayne / Huntress appears in Legends of the Superheroes, portrayed by Barbara Joyce.
- Helena Wayne / Huntress was considered to appear in Batman Beyond as an alternative to having a "Batgirl Beyond".
- Helena Wayne / Huntress, renamed Helena Kyle, appears in Birds of Prey, portrayed by Ashley Scott. This version is based primarily on her Bronze Age comics counterpart and is the metahuman daughter of Batman and Catwoman, the latter of whom raised Helena without revealing who her father was until Catwoman was murdered by Clayface and Barbara Gordon took over raising her. Having inherited her mother's powers, such as enhanced agility, strength, healing, and a sixth sense for danger, Helena forms the titular Birds of Prey with Gordon and Dinah Redmond to fight crime in Batman's stead.
- Helena Kyle / Huntress makes a cameo appearance in "Crisis on Infinite Earths", portrayed again by Ashley Scott.

=== Film ===
Helena Wayne / Huntress appears in Justice League: Crisis on Infinite Earths, voiced by Erika Ishii.

== Analysis and reception ==
Editor Paul Levitz justified the creation of Helena Wayne by a wish to bring more diversity into the comic books, for the ALL-STAR JSA group, and to give Power Girl (the only female in the groups at the time) someone to contrast with and befriend.

Reviewers Michael Eury and Gina Misiroglu found the character of Helena Wayne "intriguingly distinguished by her parentage". This incarnation of the Huntress "so enthralled DC readers fascinated by the heroine's lineage and motivation" that she was spun out into her own successful series. When the character was eliminated by DC's Crisis on Infinite Earths series, it "was too popular to fully jettison from the DC universe", leading to the creation of Helena Bertinelli as the next Huntress.
