= Robin (Earth-Two) =

- Robin of Earth-Two as seen in the interior artwork from Who's Who: The Definitive Directory of the DC Universe #19 (September 1986). Art by Ken Steacy.

Publication information
- Publisher: DC Comics
- First appearance: Justice League of America #55 (August 1967); Detective Comics #38 (April 1940, retroactive)
- Created by: Gardner Fox and Mike Sekowsky based on the original Robin by Bob Kane and Bill Finger

In-story information
- Full name: Richard "Dick" Grayson
- Species: Human
- Team affiliations: Batman Family; Justice Society of America; All-Star Squadron
- Partnerships: Batman
- Notable aliases: Batman
- Abilities: Master detective, peak human physical condition, martial arts master, escapologist, expert ventriloquist, access to high tech equipment

Robin of Earth-Two is an alternate version of the superhero Robin, who appears in American comic books published by DC Comics. The character was introduced after DC Comics created Earth-Two, a parallel world that was retroactively established as the home of characters which had been published in the Golden Age of comic books. This allowed creators to publish comic books taking place in current continuity while being able to disregard Golden Age stories featuring Robin, solving an incongruity, as Robin had been published as a single ongoing incarnation since inception. Unlike his main counterpart, Robin is the only alter ego of Dick Grayson, who uses the title into adulthood, rather than taking on later codenames such as Nightwing or Batman. In addition, the name "Robin" is not taken on by later characters.

The character history of the Earth-Two Robin accordingly adopts all of the earliest stories featuring the character from the 1940s and 1950s, while the adventures of the mainstream Robin (who lived on "Earth-One") begin later in time and with certain elements of his origin retold. Both were depicted as separate, though parallel, individuals living in their respective universes, with the "older" Earth-Two character eventually reaching his retirement and death. After the events of DC's continuity-altering Flashpoint, Earth 2's Dick Grayson never adopted the role of Robin, which was instead originated by Helena Wayne, daughter of Earth-2's Batman and Catwoman, who later took the name Huntress. Dick instead married Barbara Gordon and lived an ordinary life until Darkseid's second invasion forced him to learn survival skills from Ted Grant.

== Publication history ==
At the dawn of the Silver Age of Comic Books, DC Comics decided to reimagine several of their greatest superheroes. The Flash and Green Lantern were reimagined as Barry Allen and Hal Jordan. Superman and Batman were different and remained untouched. In the story "Flash of Two Worlds", it was revealed that the Golden Age and Silver Age heroes originate from parallel universes.

== Fictional character biography ==
=== Childhood and early history ===
Robin's origin and history begins the same as the classic version except the timeframe occurs when Detective Comics #38 was originally printed in 1940. After his parents, the Flying Graysons, are murdered, Dick confides in Batman. The hero advises him not to go to the police concerning what he overheard Tony Zucco's men planning. Batman feels a kinship to the boy, a period of training ensues, and the young Dick Grayson becomes Robin. Robin participates in the war-time only All-Star Squadron.

=== Silver Age History ===
Eventually, Robin assumes Batman's position as Gotham City's premier crime fighter. Unlike his Earth-One counterpart, who distances himself from his mentor's shadow when he adopts his Nightwing persona, this version adopts a costume which mimics several elements of Batman's own uniform (including an insignia with an encircled "R" surrounded by two bat wings). While his younger doppelganger attends and then leaves college prematurely, Grayson pursues further education to attain his law degree. Eventually, he becomes a practicing attorney in the law firm that eventually becomes Cranston, Grayson and Wayne.

Robin was initiated into the Justice Society of America, assuming the membership vacated by Batman's retirement. During his tenure, he developed friendships with several members, most notably Johnny Thunder, while developing some animosity towards Hawkman who expressed reluctance towards his membership. Years later, Robin, along with his heroic colleagues, perished at the hands of the Justice League due to the involvement of Earth-Prime resident turned supervillain Cary Bates, however he was soon restored to life. After this experience he reverted to a variation of his traditional uniform's style and colors.

During his post-Gotham City career, Grayson left Gotham to become the United States Ambassador to South Africa during the mid-1970s while continuing his crime fighting career for a brief period in that country. His inclusion in the new Justice Society series, according to writer Gerry Conway, "was a nod to the present". After his involvement with the Justice Society of America when the villains Brainwave and Per Degaton attempt to destroy the world at several key points including China, South Africa and Seattle in the United States, he returns to Gotham City.

Robin assists the Justice Society and Bruce's daughter Huntress (Helena Wayne) in dealing with Bill Jensen, a white-collar criminal apprehended by Wayne having attained mystical abilities. Robin leaves Gotham after this incident, returning years later when the Joker attacks several prominent Gothamites. At this point, he developed unexpressed feelings towards the Huntress, but left Gotham once more before pursuing them further.

In the limited series Crisis on Infinite Earths, the multiverse is destroyed. Among the lost worlds is Earth-Two. Following this crisis Earth Two "never existed" and retroactively removed Earth-Two Robin from history, blending elements of his past with Earth-One, effectively creating a new modern continuity. Shortly afterward, Robin and Huntress are killed in battle with the Anti-Monitor's shadow demons.

=== 52 ===
In the final issue of 52, a version of Earth-Two appears among the alternate universes after the multiverse is restored. This universe is similar to, yet distinct from, the original Earth-Two. The series Justice Society (2008) confirms that the post-Crisis Earth-2 is completely separate from the pre-Crisis Earth-Two. In the new Earth-Two, Bruce Wayne was killed by the Joker and Dick Grayson and Helena Wayne had mutual feelings for each other.

== Other versions ==
A reimagined version of the Earth-Two Dick Grayson appears in the series Earth 2. This version never became Robin, with Helena Wayne being Batman's sidekick. Dick Grayson is married to Barbara Gordon, with whom he has a son named John. When Darkseid invades Earth, Dick and Barbara take shelter. After Barbara is killed, Dick hands his son over to Jonni Thunder for safekeeping as he goes to Chicago. After avenging his wife's murder, Dick is trained by Ted Grant in survival. Following the "Convergence" storyline, Dick assumes the mantle of Batman.

== Powers and abilities ==
Dick's abilities and equipment are the same as his Earth-One counterpart.

== In other media ==
The Earth-Two version of Dick Grayson / Robin appears in Justice League: Crisis on Infinite Earths, voiced by Zach Callison.

== See also ==
- Alternative versions of Robin
- All-Star Squadron
- Dick Grayson
- Huntress (Helena Wayne)
- Justice Society of America
- Multiverse (DC Comics)
- Superman (Kal-L)
