= Worlds' Finest =

Comic book series

- Cover for Worlds' Finest #1 (July 2012), art by George Pérez.

Publication information
- Publisher: DC Comics
- Schedule: Monthly
- Format: Ongoing series
- Genre: Superhero
- Publication date: July 2012 – May 2015
- No. of issues: 33 (#1–32 plus an issue numbered 0), a Worlds' Finest: Futures End one-shot, and 1 Annual
- Main character(s): Power Girl; Huntress

Creative team
- Written by: Paul Levitz
- Artist(s): List: Geraldo Borges, José Luis García-López, Tyler Kirkham, Barry Kitson, Kevin Maguire, Scott McDaniel, Jerry Ordway, George Pérez
- Inker(s): Scott Koblish
- Editor(s): List: Mike Cotton, Rachel Gluckstern, Wil Moss, Rickey Purdin

Worlds' Finest is a comic book published by DC Comics, a reimagining of the classic World's Finest Comics, with a similar name but a differently-placed apostrophe. It was launched in May 2012 with a July 2012 cover date. The series was part of a second wave of The New 52 reboot and was one of six titles replacing previously cancelled titles.

== Publication history ==
Written by Paul Levitz and drawn by George Pérez and Kevin Maguire, the series stars the Huntress and Power Girl. In the first issue, the two heroines are established as being from Earth 2, where they used the codenames Robin and Supergirl, respectively, and having accidentally been exiled to the main DC Universe.

The Huntress, the daughter of Earth 2's Batman, has maintained a heroic identity for some time. The first issue reveals that Helena Bertinelli has been dead for a long time and that Helena Wayne has been using her identity, as seen in the 2011–2012 Huntress miniseries. Power Girl, in contrast, has functioned solely in her civilian identity of Karen Starr, as a billionaire industrialist using her ownership of Starr Labs as a cover to try to discover a way for them to return home. After a Starr Labs subsidiary in Japan is destroyed, Karen adopts the superhero identity of Power Girl to fight alongside the Huntress.

The two eventually succeed in returning to Earth 2, and with issue #27 (Dec. 2014) the series began to feature the Superman and Batman of Earth 2 as the main characters. The series was cancelled as of issue #32 (May 2015) which went on sale in March.

== Collected editions ==
Title	Material collected	Date Published	ISBN
Worlds' Finest, Vol. 1: The Lost Daughters of Earth 2	Worlds' Finest #0–5	April 2013	978-1401238346
Worlds' Finest, Vol. 2: Hunt and Be Hunted	Worlds' Finest #6–12	November 2013	978-1401242763
Worlds' Finest, Vol. 3: Control Issues	Worlds' Finest #13–18 (Note: Issue #18 was reprinted in both Volumes 3 and 4 of the collected editions.)	June 2014	978-1401246167
Worlds' Finest, Vol. 4: First Contact	Worlds' Finest #18–21, Annual #1, Batman/Superman #8-9	December 2014	978-1401250980
Worlds' Finest, Vol. 5: Homeward Bound	Worlds' Finest #22–26, Worlds' Finest: Futures End #1	June 2015	978-1401254209
Worlds' Finest, Vol. 6: The Secret History of Superman and Batman	Worlds' Finest #27–32	December 2015	978-1401257767
