= Batman & Dracula trilogy =

1991 graphic novel by Doug Moench and Kelley Jones

- Cover of the hardcover edition of Batman & Dracula: Red Rain, art by Kelley Jones and Malcolm Jones III.

Publication information
- Publisher: DC Comics
- Publication date: 1991—1998
- Main characters: Batman; Count Dracula; Jim Gordon; Alfred Pennyworth; Joker; Catwoman; Two-Face; Killer Croc

Creative team
- Written by: Doug Moench
- Penciller: Kelley Jones
- Inker(s): Malcolm Jones III; John Beatty (Bloodstorm and Crimson Mist)
- Letterer: Todd Klein
- Colorist(s): Les Dorscheid, Gregory Wright (Crimson Mist)

Collected editions
- Red Rain: ISBN 1563890364
- Bloodstorm: ISBN 1563891859
- Crimson Mist: ISBN 1563894955

The Batman & Dracula trilogy consists of three American graphic novels—Batman & Dracula: Red Rain (1991), Batman: Bloodstorm (1994), and Batman: Crimson Mist (1998)—written by Doug Moench and penciled by Kelley Jones. The books were published by the comic book publishing company DC Comics as a part of its Elseworlds line of comics. Moench created the concept for the first installment and convinced Jones, of whom he was a fan, to join the project. Red Rain's eventual popularity resulted in DC commissioning sequels.

Set outside the DC Universe and Bram Stoker's literary canons, the trilogy begins with a parallel universe counterpart of Batman discovering Count Dracula and his minions feeding off the homeless of Gotham City. To save the city, this Batman becomes a vampire to gain the strength to defeat Dracula, which ultimately makes his bat-based persona more akin to the vampire king. Batman also meets Selina Kyle, commonly known as Catwoman, who in this universe is a werecat creature who transforms by night. The two soon team up after they realise that they are not enemies. Struggling to use his black powers for good, Batman finds himself increasingly driven insane by his bloodlust and eventually kills the Joker before forcing Alfred Pennyworth and Commissioner Gordon to stake him. The stake is later removed by Alfred during a crime wave, and Batman slaughters most of his old enemies and other criminals, after which survivors Two-Face and Killer Croc attempt to get rid of him once and for all.

The Batman & Dracula books were among the earliest and most popular titles of the Elseworlds line, with each listed on the Diamond Comic Distributors bestsellers list. Journalists have praised the books for their story and artwork. Since the trilogy's conclusion, several other DC print releases have featured stories set within Batman & Dracula's world, and the vampire Batman has appeared in some non-comic book media.

== Publication history ==
The Batman & Dracula trilogy was written by Doug Moench and penciled by Kelley Jones. Moench previously wrote Batman and Detective Comics from 1983 to 1986, while Jones was known for redesigning Deadman for the limited series Deadman: Love After Death (1989—1990) and illustrating seven issues of Neil Gaiman's The Sandman (1989—1996). The books were published by DC Comics under its Elseworlds imprint, which was designated for comics that took place outside the DC Universe canon. The initial installment, Batman & Dracula: Red Rain, was an early Elseworlds book; the first, Batman: Holy Terror, had only been released a few months earlier. The Batman & Dracula stories pay homage to the old Universal Pictures and Hammer Film Productions horror films.

According to Jones, Red Rain was produced after he finished Love After Death. Editor Archie Goodwin had been impressed by Jones' work on the series and wanted him to draw a Detective Comics cover to see his take on Batman. The image Jones produced—which depicted Batman diving down with a "weird cape" and surrounded by bats—impressed Goodwin and Dennis O'Neil, the editor of the Batman family of comics. O'Neil wanted to use Jones' art for a Batman book and had been talking to Moench, who was also a fan of Jones. Moench contacted Jones and told him about the concept he had made for an Elseworlds story in which Batman fights Count Dracula. Jones initially thought it was "the dumbest thing [he] ever heard", but changed his mind after Moench sent him the outline for it, which Jones called "out of the park wonderful". The original title was Glory in Scarlet before being changed to Red Rain. It took Moench and Jones five months to produce Red Rain. They used an approach somewhat similar to the Marvel method: Moench provided Jones with a plot description for each page, with a few lines of dialogue scattered throughout. Malcolm Jones III inked the art.

Red Rain was released in December 1991. It was first available as a 90-page hardcover graphic novel that retailed for US$4.95. Moench and Jones did not envision it as the beginning of a trilogy, instead as a one-shot similar to Batman/Judge Dredd: Judgment on Gotham and Arkham Asylum: A Serious House on Serious Earth, but after it sold well above expectations, DC commissioned the two to produce a sequel. Jones said that they were offered the sequel alongside another Elseworlds story, Batman/Dark Joker: The Wild. The sequel, Batman: Bloodstorm, was published in January 1994; Jones said the gap was caused by his responsibilities on Dark Joker. When he started illustrating, he was also hired as the cover artist for Batman and Detective Comics. John Beatty had to ink Bloodstorm because Malcolm Jones III was having personal issues.

Moench and Jones thought Bloodstorm would be the last Batman & Dracula story because both were now going to work on the monthly Batman titles, but it also sold above expectations. Les Dorscheid had colored Jones' art in the first two books, but he was replaced by Gregory Wright. Unlike Dorscheid, Wright colored the art digitally. Batman: Crimson Mist was released in December 1998. Moench knew that Crimson Mist was the conclusion, as he felt it was going to be the hardest and needed to end on an unsettling note. A collected edition comprising all three books, Tales of the Multiverse: Batman – Vampire, was released in December 2007. A second collection of the trilogy, Elseworlds: Batman Volume 2, was released on October 5, 2016.

== Titles ==
=== Batman & Dracula: Red Rain (1991) ===
- Writer: Doug Moench
- Penciler: Kelley Jones
- Inker: Malcolm Jones III

Batman investigates a series of murders of homeless people of Gotham City whose throats have been slashed. He discovers that a family of vampires led by Count Dracula are behind the murders. A rogue vampire, Tanya, chooses to help Batman, visiting him in his sleep and biting him to infuse him with vampiric strength, allowing him to stand up to Dracula's minions while retaining his humanity. Tanya informs Batman that vampires created by Dracula are powerless against his abilities.

Determined to destroy Dracula's minions, Batman lures them into the Batcave. Tanya and her followers distract them while Batman detonates multiple explosive charges, destroying Wayne Manor and killing the vampires. Batman then confronts Dracula in aerial combat and impales him on a wooden utility pole. This act costs Batman his humanity, as Dracula drains the last of his blood before his death. Batman tells Alfred Pennyworth that while Bruce Wayne is now physically dead, the Batman will go on forever now that he is a full vampire.

According to North American comic distributor Diamond Comic Distributors (DCD), Red Rain was the fourth most-ordered graphic novel of 1991 and the year's 17th bestselling graphic novel overall.

=== Batman: Bloodstorm (1994) ===
- Writer: Doug Moench
- Penciler: Kelley Jones
- Inker: John Beatty

The Joker tracks down and commandeers the remaining vampires of Dracula's horde. Although they manage to take control of most of Gotham's major crime families under the Joker's guidance, a team consisting of Batman, Catwoman (now a were-cat after a confrontation with a werewolf), Commissioner Gordon, Alfred, and their team of vampire hunters from the Gotham City Police Department eventually destroy the horde. Gordon, Alfred and their team stake the former crime lords during the day while Batman and Catwoman confront the last vampires in a warehouse.

Catwoman is killed by the Joker, taking a crossbow bolt for Batman, after defeating the werewolf who made her what she had become. Enraged at the loss of the only person who was able to help him control his bloodlust, Batman subsequently drains the Joker of his blood and thus succumbs to his murderous impulse. Horrified by what he has done, Batman stakes the Joker to ensure that he cannot return as a vampire. He then convinces Gordon and Alfred to stake him so that he cannot commit any further murders.

DCD estimated that Bloodstorm was the fourth most-ordered and fourth bestselling graphic novel of 1994. By May 1995, it was still among the top 15 most preordered graphic novels.

=== Batman: Crimson Mist (1998) ===
- Writer: Doug Moench
- Penciler: Kelley Jones
- Inker: John Beatty

With Gotham in the grip of a crime wave in Batman's absence, Commissioner Gordon asks Alfred to remove the stake in an attempt to bring back the city's hero. Driven mad by the decay of his body and his longing for blood, Batman begins draining and killing the city's vile criminals, especially his rogues gallery (Penguin, Riddler, Scarecrow, Poison Ivy and Black Mask, among others imprisoned at Arkham Asylum), creating chaos as the body count escalates. Two-Face and Killer Croc form an alliance with Gordon and Alfred to stop Batman's rampage, as both acknowledge that the man that Batman once was would not wish to go on killing his opponents in this manner. Having tracked Batman to his new lair in the old Batcave, Alfred lures him into the main part of the cavern. The group trigger explosives to expose Batman to the sun.

During the struggle, Two-Face and Killer Croc betray and attempt to kill Alfred and Gordon after Batman is nearly fatally injured. Alfred sacrifices his life, giving his blood to Batman and grant him the strength needed to save Gordon. Having killed Killer Croc and Two-Face by impaling Croc on a stalagmite and sticking arrows into both sides of Two-Face's head, respectively, Batman convinces Gordon to trigger the trap and the roof of the Batcave is destroyed. Gordon is crushed by falling rubble. Deeming that his mission is over after ridding Gotham of both vampires and criminals at the cost of his soul, Batman walks into the sunlight and disintegrates into dust, hoping in his last moments that he can destroy the monster within him and finally find peace.

According to DCD, Crimson Mist was the third most-ordered and third bestselling graphic novel of November 1998, with sales estimated at 7,694 copies. It also charted as the fifth most preordered graphic novel of September 2001, with estimated sales of 6,009.

== Reception ==
The Batman & Dracula books were among the most popular Elseworlds titles. Nerdist's Rosie Knight described the series as a cult classic. Eric Van Lustbader wrote that, while Red Rain featured an unusual version of Batman, it still managed to retain the feel of his world and somehow showed a more human side of Batman. Lustbader found the story engaging and innovative, and felt it set a new high for "cross-referencing characters from different milieus".

Reviewing Red Rain, IGN's Hilary Goldstein found that no other Elseworlds story featuring Batman was able to top it. He praised its unexpected plot twists and Jones' art style (which he said made the story feel like "a horrible living nightmare") and encouraged readers to buy it. Goldstein's only criticism was of the cover: he thought the illustration of Batman crawling from a grave was superb, but noted that it took up less than a fourth of the cover. He also wrote that Bloodstorm and Crimson Mist were inferior to Red Rain; he said that they were enjoyable but felt like they were "clogg[ed] up" with existing Batman enemies.

Goldstein and fellow IGN writer Joshua Yehl went on to rank Red Rain the sixth greatest Batman graphic novel, offering particular praise for Jones' powerful art. Similarly, Screen Rant's Danijel Striga called the trilogy the eighth best DC story set in an alternate reality. He found its concept of turning Batman into a vampire simple yet clever, and described it as "tak[ing] Batman's already dark world and mak[ing] it pitch black".

== Legacy ==
Since the trilogy's conclusion, the Batman & Dracula trilogy's world has been explored in other DC print releases. Jones illustrated a story by Peter Johnson set in the trilogy's universe in Infinite Halloween Special #1 (December 2007). Titled "Red Rain: Blood Lust", it tells the story of the vampiric Batman brutally murdering Dick Grayson's parents and is narrated by the Mad Hatter. In Countdown to Final Crisis (2007—2008), the series' events are described as taking place on the 43rd alternate version of Earth in the DC Comics Multiverse. For this series, Johnson and Jones produced another story that features a team of superheroes traveling to Earth-43 during a search for Ray Palmer. There, they encounter the trilogy's characters.

For Convergence (2015), Len Wein and Jones produced a storyline in which the Swamp Thing arrives in the world of the Batman & Dracula trilogy and meets the vampire Batman. The story explores the emotional cost being a vampire has on Batman, depicting him as horrified of what he has become. He and the Swamp Thing team up to fight destroy as many of the remaining vampires as possible and manage to kill the vampire queen; after the queen's destruction, every vampire becomes human again except Batman, who cannot revert since he was bitten by Dracula. Batman and the Swamp Thing watch the sunrise together and Batman expresses with awe how beautiful he thinks it is before disintegrating into dust.

== Collected editions ==
Title	Material collected	Published date	ISBN
Batman & Dracula: Red Rain	Original graphic novel	February 1992	978-1563890123
Batman: Bloodstorm	Original graphic novel	July 1995	978-1563891779
Batman: Crimson Mist	Original graphic novel	March 1999	978-1840230703
Elseworlds: Batman Vol. 2	Batman & Dracula: Red Rain, Batman: Bloodstorm, Batman: Crimson Mist	October 2016	978-1401269821

== Adaptations ==
- The 2005 animated film The Batman vs. Dracula draws inspiration from the Batman & Dracula trilogy, specifically the first two books Red Rain and Bloodstorm. Knight and ComicsAlliance's Elle Collins both thought adapting Batman & Dracula into a film was a good idea, with Collins listing actors she thought should play the roles of each character.
- Several elements of Red Rain are included in Batman: The Brave and the Bold. In the episode "Shadow of the Bat!" while Batman and Etrigan were hunting Dala Vadim, Batman was bitten by Dala, becoming a vampire. After he targets all the members of Justice League International, he is cured by Etrigan and Martian Manhunter. An alternate version of Vampire Batman, based on Red Rain, makes cameo appearances as part a group of Batman variants.
- The vampire Batman is playable in the 2013 video game Infinite Crisis.
- In 2013, Mattel released an action figure of the trilogy's version of Batman.
- In 2017 Mondo released a statue of a vampire Batman called "Batman Red Rain". The figure depicts Batman looming over a graveyard and has an interchangeable arm holding a stake. It is not directly modeled after Jones' artwork, but rather is based on a Mondo poster by Francesco Francavilla that was inspired by Red Rain.

== See also ==
- Batman Dracula, a 1964 film
- Batman Fights Dracula, a 1967 Filipino film
- The Batman vs. Dracula, a 2005 animated film
