= Dracula (comics) =

Index of articles associated with the same name

Dracula, in comics may refer to:

- Dracula (DC Comics), a DC Comics supervillain who has appeared in Superman and Batman comics, and is the first antagonist of Elseworlds' imprint Batman & Dracula trilogy and the main antagonist of the animated film The Batman vs. Dracula
- Dracula (Marvel Comics), a Marvel Comics supervillain
- Dracula (Dell Comics), a superhero published by Dell Comics
- Dracula (Buffy the Vampire Slayer), a character appearing in comic book adaptations of the TV series Buffy the Vampire Slayer
- Dracula, a character from the Boom! Studios series Dracula: The Company of Monsters
- Dracula, a villain in the Image Comics series Sword of Dracula
- Dracula, a character in Dynamite Entertainment's Ash vs. Dracula and The Magdalena vs. Dracula

== See also ==
- Dracula (disambiguation)
