= Gotham season 3 =

Season of television series

Gotham
- Season 3
- Home media cover art
- Starring: Ben McKenzie; David Mazouz; Donal Logue; Morena Baccarin; Sean Pertwee; Robin Lord Taylor; Erin Richards; Camren Bicondova; Cory Michael Smith; Jessica Lucas; Chris Chalk; Drew Powell; Maggie Geha; Benedict Samuel; Michael Chiklis
- No. of episodes: 22

Release
- Original network: Fox
- Original release: September 19, 2016 – June 5, 2017

Season chronology
- ← Previous; Season 2 Next → Season 4

The third season of the American television series Gotham, based on characters from DC Comics related to the Batman franchise, revolves around the characters of James "Jim" Gordon and Bruce Wayne. The season is produced by Primrose Hill Productions, DC Entertainment, and Warner Bros. Television, with Bruno Heller, Danny Cannon, John Stephens, and Ken Woodruff serving as executive producers. The season included inspirations from The Dark Knight Returns, Batman: The Killing Joke, and Batman: Death of the Family.

The season was ordered in March 2016 and every cast member from the last season returned with the exception of Zabryna Guevara as Sarah Essen; James Frain as Theo Galavan / Azrael; and Nicholas D'Agosto as Harvey Dent. New additions to the cast include Benedict Samuel as Jervis Tetch; and Maggie Geha as a grown Ivy Pepper, recasting the role portrayed by Clare Foley in previous seasons, who appears in a guest role. The season was broadcast over three consecutive runs: the first 11 episodes aired from September to November 2016; the next three aired in January 2017; and the other eight episodes aired from April to June 2017. Like the previous season, the season also holds two subtitles. The first 14 episodes are subtitled Mad City while the other eight episodes are subtitled Heroes Rise. The season premiered on September 19, 2016, and concluded on June 5, 2017, with a two-hour finale on Fox.

== Premise ==
With the Indian Hill fugitives on the loose, Jim Gordon takes matters into his own hands as a bounty hunter. But will he find demented mastermind Hugo Strange and his deranged subject, Fish Mooney? Bullock and Barnes attempt to hold the front line on crime against burgeoning Super-Villains Oswald Cobblepot / Penguin, Edward Nygma / Riddler, the future Poison Ivy and Jervis Tetch, aka Mad Hatter.

== Cast and characters ==
=== Main ===
- Ben McKenzie as James "Jim" Gordon
- Donal Logue as Harvey Bullock
- David Mazouz as Bruce Wayne / 514A
- Morena Baccarin as Leslie "Lee" Thompkins
- Sean Pertwee as Alfred Pennyworth
- Robin Lord Taylor as Oswald Cobblepot / Penguin
- Erin Richards as Barbara Kean
- Camren Bicondova as Selina Kyle
- Cory Michael Smith as Edward Nygma / The Riddler
- Jessica Lucas as Tabitha Galavan
- Chris Chalk as Lucius Fox
- Drew Powell as Butch Gilzean / Cyrus Gold
- Maggie Geha as Ivy Pepper
- Benedict Samuel as Jervis Tetch
- Michael Chiklis as Nathaniel Barnes / The Executioner

=== Recurring ===
- Leslie Hendrix as Kathryn Monroe
- James Carpinello as Dr. Mario Calvi
- Jamie Chung as Valerie Vale
- John Doman as Carmine Falcone
- Jada Pinkett Smith as Fish Mooney
- B. D. Wong as Hugo Strange
- Chelsea Spack as Isabella
- Raymond J. Barry as The Shaman
- Richard Kind as Mayor Aubrey James
- Naian Gonzalez Norvind as Alice Tetch
- Anthony Carrigan as Victor Zsasz
- Ivana Miličević as Maria Kyle
- Cameron Monaghan as Jerome Valeska
- James Remar as Frank Gordon
- Nathan Darrow as Victor Fries / Mr. Freeze
- Camila Perez as Bridgit Pike / Firefly
- J.W. Cortes as Detective Carlos Alvarez

=== Notable guests ===
- Tonya Pinkins as Ethel Peabody
- James Andrew O'Connor as Tommy Bones
- Paul Reubens as Elijah Van Dahl
- Brian McManamon as Basil
- Paul Pilcz as Sonny Gilzean
- Alexander Siddig as Ra's al Ghul

== Episodes ==
No. overall	No. in season	Title	Directed by	Written by	Original release date	Prod. code	US viewers (millions)
Mad City
45	1	"Better to Reign in Hell..."	Danny Cannon	John Stephens	September 19, 2016	T13.19901	3.90
Six months after Fish's disappearance, Lee has moved on with a new man in her life and Gordon has become a bounty hunter tracking down the Indian Hill escapees. Cobblepot puts a bounty on Fish and visits Nygma at Arkham, surmising that Fish has an ulterior motive; but Nygma advises him to just kill her. Bruce's doppelgänger lurks around Gotham and learns of Bruce's identity from Ivy, who mistakes him for Bruce. Aided by reporter Valerie Vale, Gordon tracks down Hugo Strange's assistant Ethel Peabody, who is later captured and killed by Fish, leading Barnes and Harvey Bullock to demand Gordon to stay away from GCPD. Her gang catches Ivy spying on them, but she runs and falls down a sewage pipe after being touched by a gang member who can accelerate a person's aging process. Bruce and Alfred call a meeting with the Wayne Enterprises Board of Directors, whom Bruce threatens with disseminating his alleged evidence pertaining to the cabal in charge behind the scenes, unless they contact him. The cabal sends an enforcer to kidnap Bruce. Meanwhile, Barbara and Tabitha refuse Cobblepot's protection. In an attempt to reconcile with Tabitha, Butch hires a mobster; but Cobblepot scolds him.
46	2	"Burn the Witch"	Danny Cannon	Ken Woodruff	September 26, 2016	T13.19902	3.54
Bruce is brought before Kathryn, a high-ranking member of the secret council. He recognizes her from various Wayne Enterprises events. Bruce agrees to cease all his investigations in exchange for the lives of those closest to him. Cobblepot rallies the public against the "monsters". Ivy washes ashore as a grown woman, attacking a man for mistreating plants. Fish captures Bullock and uses her powers to make him lead her to the secret facility holding Strange, the only person she believes can save her life. Gordon makes a deal with Fish to help her escape with Strange if she hands over Bullock, and informs Cobblepot of her escape route. Cobblepot prepares to kill her, but lets her go when she reveals that she spared him because the "Penguin" was her greatest creation. The public under his command breaks into the facility and kills some of Fish's minions. Valerie visits Gordon about his deal with Fish, and they share a kiss. Bruce's doppelgänger breaks into Wayne Manor and asks him for help. Lee returns to Gotham.
47	3	"Look into My Eyes"	Rob Bailey	Danny Cannon	October 3, 2016	T13.19903	3.19
Hypnotist Jervis Tetch hires Gordon to find his sister Alice, an Indian Hill escapee whose blood contains a virus. Barnes offers Lee her old job back at GCPD. Cobblepot challenges Aubrey's competence and decides to run for mayor, claiming to clean up Gotham's corrupt system; to aid with his campaign, he has Nygma declared legally sane and released from Arkham. Gordon gets into a brawl and is stitched up by Lee's new fiancé, Mario Calvi, at the ER. After Alice tells Gordon she wants nothing to do with Jervis, Gordon questions him, who hypnotizes him into nearly committing suicide. Alice saves Gordon, who brings her into GCPD. Lee and Mario have dinner with his father, revealed to be Falcone, who is worried about Gordon's possible jealousy. Bruce takes in his doppelgänger, Subject 514A a.k.a. "Five", who demonstrates impressive fighting skills and imperviousness to pain. Five later impersonates Bruce and takes an oblivious Selina out on the town.
48	4	"New Day Rising"	Eagle Egilsson	Robert Hull	October 10, 2016	T13.19904	3.42
Five assists Selina in robbing a bar and rescues her when she is captured, but she sees the scars on his body and identifies him as an imposter. Five admits he wanted to experience a normal life by socializing with someone, but she reassures him that he is more normal than he thinks, and he kisses her. Tetch hypnotizes the wrestling Tweedle Brothers to help him break into GCPD and kidnap Alice, but Gordon and Bullock track them down. Gordon finds himself still under the suicidal influence of Tetch's hypnosis; realizing his suicidal urges are connected to his issues with Lee, Gordon overcomes them and breaks the hypnosis. Alice falls and is impaled on a pipe, leaving a grief-stricken Tetch to escape. While investigating the crime scene, Barnes becomes infected by Alice's dripping blood. Cobblepot has Butch bribe campaign officials to buy the election, but Nygma takes the money back; Cobblepot wins anyway and realizes Nygma wanted to show him that the people genuinely want him as Mayor. Cobblepot appoints Nygma as his chief of staff, to Butch's displeasure. Gordon reconciles with Lee. Five bids farewell to Bruce and tries to leave Gotham but is kidnapped by Kathryn.
49	5	"Anything for You"	TJ Scott	Denise Thé	October 17, 2016	T13.19905	3.32
Cobblepot's term as mayor starts well, but a new Red Hood Gang appears and openly challenges his authority. Nygma discovers that Butch is behind the new gang as part of a scheme to make himself Cobblepot's right-hand man again. At a celebratory party in the mayor's honor, Nygma manipulates Butch into exposing himself as the mastermind behind the Red Hoods, thus reinforcing his position as Cobblepot's most trusted friend and ally. Barnes asks Lee about the tests on Alice's blood without revealing that he was exposed to it. He is later revealed to have gained superhuman strength. To please Selina, Bruce hires Gordon to find Ivy, who later confronts Selina without revealing her identity. At Gordon's suggestion, Bruce tells Selina how he feels about her, but she dismissively tells him that he only feels that way because he has never dated anyone. Bruce reasserts his feelings and Selina kisses him. Elsewhere, Jervis Tetch mourns Alice's death and plots revenge against Gordon, killing a girl resembling her.
50	6	"Follow the White Rabbit"	Nathan Hope	Steven Lilien & Bryan Wynbrandt	October 24, 2016	T13.19906	3.48
Tetch begins a killing spree, hypnotizing several civilians into life-threatening situations and forcing Gordon to choose whom to save, leading to the other persons' deaths. Eventually, Tetch demands Gordon kill one of the hostages himself. Gordon refuses, and Tetch kills both. He later kidnaps Valerie and Lee, demanding Gordon to go to Mario's alone. Gordon enlists Mario's help without involving the GCPD. While Mario recovers his gun from the basement, Gordon joins Tetch's "tea party", which Mario interrupts to rescue the women. However, Tetch is revealed to have unloaded the gun, having Mario locked. He then forces Gordon to choose the victim. He picks Lee, resulting in Tech shooting Valerie instead. She is rushed to the hospital. Meanwhile, Cobblepot realizes he is in love with Nygma and plans to confess his feelings for him. However, Nygma meets one Isabella, who resembles Kristen Kringle and is interested in riddles as well. Barnes is revealed to have anger restraint difficulty as a result of his exposure.
51	7	"Red Queen"	Scott White	Megan Mostyn-Brown	October 31, 2016	T13.19907	3.16
Valerie recovers, but ends her relationship with Gordon, knowing he manipulated Tetch into shooting her instead of Lee. Tetch breaks into the morgue and drains the blood from Alice's corpse. He also exposes Gordon to the powerful "Red Queen", causing intense hallucinations in which Barbara leads Gordon to a war-torn GCPD, then a life where he is married to Lee with two children, and to an encounter with his deceased father, who encourages him to be a better protector for Gotham. Mario brings Gordon back to consciousness. Cobblepot reveals Nygma's past to Isabella in an attempt to end their relationship, but to no avail. Barnes and Bullock learn Tetch is planning to spread the virus at the city founders' party, and arrest him in time; Tetch learns of Barnes' exposure, however. As Barnes composes his will, Gordon decides to honor his father by rejoining the GCPD. The secret council is revealed to have plans for Cobblepot, with one member wearing a ring similar to that of Gordon's father's. Bruce begins dating Selina.
52	8	"Blood Rush"	Rob Bailey	Tze Chun	November 7, 2016	T13.19908	3.52
After losing control and killing a criminal, Barnes visits Tetch at Arkham and demands to know if the virus can be cured, but Tetch refuses the possibility. Barnes begins hearing "voices" that urge him to kill more criminals. He finds the mastermind, plastic surgeon Maxwell Symon, who removes his victims' faces to insert on customers who intend to change their faces. Barnes arrests Symon after overcoming the voices. Lee and Mario throw an engagement party, where Barnes makes plans to turn himself into police custody. However, his psychosis overpowers him when he learns Symon has been released due to his powerful connections. Mario threatens Gordon to stay away from Lee. Losing faith in Gotham's justice system, Barnes throws Symon off a window and plans to murder criminals on a larger scale. Symon tells Gordon about Barnes. Meanwhile, Ed fears that Isabella might meet Kringle's fate and decides to end the relationship, encouraged by Oswald. However, Isabella learns of Oswald's feelings and seduces Ed again. Oswald has Gabe kill Isabella.
53	9	"The Executioner"	John Behring	Ken Woodruff	November 14, 2016	T13.19909	3.63
Barnes begins his killing spree. Knowing Gordon's awareness, Barnes attempts to frame him for murder but is unable to convince the GCPD after Bullock convinces Lee to confirm the accusation. Gordon overpowers Barnes in a duel. The latter is arrested and incarcerated in Arkham. After Isabella's death is announced an accident, Nygma begins investigating it personally and deduces it was murder, suspect Butch; Cobblepot promises to help bring retribution to Butch. Ivy reveals herself to Bruce and Selina, unintentionally causing friction in their relationship. She is revealed to be followed by crossbow-wielding mercenaries seeking to kill her for a necklace she stole. The trio escapes and later finds the necklace's original owner dead; the necklace is revealed to contain a key.
54	10	"Time Bomb"	Hanelle M. Culpepper	Robert Hull	November 21, 2016	T13.19910	3.44
Ivy uses her poison to control Alfred's mind and escape. Bruce learns about the "Whisper Gang" after the key is out to destroy the secret council, a.k.a. the Court of Owls and is therefore not his enemy. Soon after, the Court enforcer kills the Gang leader. When Mario is targeted by assassins, Falcone deduces that the Court is responsible and successfully blackmails them into ceasing their attack, not learning their motives, however. Nygma kidnaps and tortures Butch and Tabitha before discovering that they are not responsible for Isabella's death, but not before forcing Tabitha to choose between her right hand and Butch's life, choosing the latter. Nygma allows them to go to the hospital. After investigating the matter, Barbara realizes Cobblepot killed Isabella and plans to use the truth to stage a power grab. Gordon says a romantic goodbye to Lee before her upcoming wedding to Mario. When Mario sees her leaving Gordon's, he bursts into a fit of rage and exhibits symptoms of the Tetch virus.
55	11	"Beware the Green-Eyed Monster"	Danny Cannon	John Stephens	November 28, 2016	T13.19911	3.37
It is revealed that Tetch infected Mario, who vows to make Lee hate Gordon and orchestrates a series of events to make her believe Gordon is trying to sabotage their wedding merely out of jealousy. The plan works and, just before the wedding, she pushes Gordon away. Lucius proves Mario's infection to Bullock, but not before Mario and Lee disappear from the party. Gordon convinces Carmine to reveal the couple's location by promising not to kill Mario, who later attempts to kill an oblivious Lee, but Gordon arrives and guns him down, much to her shock. Barbara tells Nygma about Cobblepot, but Nygma does not believe it until luring Cobblepot into revealing his feelings. Barbara and Nygma plan to kill Cobblepot and usurp his power in the mob. Using information provided by the Whispers, Bruce's party uses the key to open the Court's vault and steal its contents – a crystalline owl statue – but are intercepted by Talon, the Court's enforcer; Selina's mother reveals herself and helps them kill Talon.
56	12	"Ghosts"	Eagle Egilsson	Danny Cannon	January 16, 2017	T13.19912	3.69
A vengeful Falcone sends Zsasz to kill Gordon, initially approved by Lee; however, after seeing what the virus has done to Barnes, she realizes Gordon may have been justified and persuades Falcone to call off the hit. Unhinged by ghostly sightings of his father, Cobblepot insults Gotham's citizens on live TV and murders his Deputy Chief of Staff, unaware that Nygma is orchestrating his downward spiral, with Basil having posed as Cobblepot's father. Bruce convinces Selina to accept her mother Maria back into her life but later learns Maria owes money to criminal Cole Clemons. Investigating the discovery of a briefly reanimated corpse, Gordon and Bullock pursue former Indian Hill employee Dwight Pollard, who secretly leads a party of Jerome Valeska's admirers. Pollard is revealed to be planning to reanimate Valeska.
57	13	"Smile Like You Mean It"	Olatunde Osunsanmi	Steven Lilien & Bryan Wynbrandt	January 23, 2017	T13.19913	3.60
When the reanimation seemingly fails, Dwight cuts off Jerome's face and wears it as a mask while he leads his "cult" to take over a news station. GCPD stops the cult, but Jerome awakens belatedly at GCPD and escapes. After the GCPD defeats the cult and secures the station, they learn of Jerome's revival, but not before he abducts Dwight. Nygma, Barbara, and Tabitha manipulate Cobblepot into believing the other crime bosses have turned against him. Bruce agrees to pay Maria's debt to Cole, but Selina becomes furious upon discovering the whole thing was a con Maria and Cole ran together, and that Bruce even suspected this but did not want Selina to learn the truth. After reattaching his face, Jerome encourages the cult to kill others and ignites explosives that kill Dwight and knock out Gotham's power, causing a citywide blackout.
58	14	"The Gentle Art of Making Enemies"	Louis Shaw Milito	Seth Boston	January 30, 2017	T13.19914	3.46
During the blackout, the GCPD struggles to contain the riots committed by both Jerome's followers and random citizens gone corrupt. Jerome kidnaps Bruce and drags him to a circus, planning a theatrical execution in front of his followers. Accompanied by Alfred, the GCPD attacks the circus. Bruce escapes and fights Jerome in a house of mirrors, but resists the urge to kill him; Jerome is then subdued and sent back to Arkham by Gordon, restoring order to the city. Having gained enough skills, Bruce decides to begin fighting crime, vowing never to kill. Cobblepot escapes a murder attempt by Nygma and is captured by Barbara, who threatens him into helping them find and kill Nygma; realizing he truly loves Nygma, Cobblepot refuses. Nygma then reveals that it was all a ruse to make him realize he is incapable of love. Despite Cobblepot having proven otherwise, Nygma shoots him and drops him into Gotham Harbor. Gordon is reunited with his uncle Frank, who is secretly a member of the Court, which continues brainwashing Five.
Heroes Rise
59	15	"How the Riddler Got His Name"	TJ Scott	Megan Mostyn-Brown	April 24, 2017	T13.19915	2.99
Bruce is summoned by Selina through a letter, but she denies sending the letter and demands him to stay away from her. Bruce later realizes the letter was sent by Five, who then drugs him and usurps his identity while the real Bruce is sent to a Court dungeon. Gordon reconnects with Frank, who states that he and Peter, Gordon's father, were members of the Court until they became disillusioned, leading to Peter's murder and making it look like an accident. Frank asks Gordon to join the Court and help him destroy it from the inside. Nygma attempts to build a name for himself by killing Gotham's elite, eventually picking Lucius as a potential arch-nemesis. After speaking to hallucinations of Cobblepot, Nygma decides to let him go and embraces his new persona as the Riddler. Meanwhile, Cobblepot wakes up in Ivy's apartment after surviving his gunshot wound.
60	16	"These Delicate and Dark Obsessions"	Ben McKenzie	Robert Hull	May 1, 2017	T13.19916	3.02
After fully recovering, Cobblepot attempts to build an army to take back power from Nygma and Barbara. He calls Gabe, who betrays him and attempts to auction him, but Ivy uses her "perfume" to rescue him. Cobblepot kills Gabe after the perfume makes the latter provoke the former by the truth. Ivy convinces Cobblepot to use the Indian Hill escapees for his army. At the dungeon, a Shaman gives Bruce hallucinogens that cause him to relive the night of his parents' murder, and soon after he begins training Bruce so that he can protect Gotham. After learning a weapon is being transported to Gotham to destroy and "cleanse" it, Gordon investigates the Court further and realizes his father's death was a hit organized by Frank, who is later ordered to kill Gordon, but he instead commits suicide. On Frank's final instructions, Gordon tells Kathryn that he killed Frank and intends to join the Court, welcomed by her.
61	17	"The Primal Riddle"	Maja Vrvilo	Steven Lilien & Bryan Wynbrandt	May 8, 2017	T13.19917	3.03
After being tipped off by Barbara about the Court, Nygma goes on a mission to solve the riddle of who controls Gotham. He takes Interim Mayor James hostage, televising a threat to end his life if he does not learn the identity of the Court. Gordon arranges a meeting with Nygma at the GCPD and convinces Nygma to be escorted to the Court; in doing this for Kathryn, Gordon takes Frank's place in the Court. Cobblepot and Ivy recruit Fries and Pike for the army that he plans to use against Nygma. Five struggles to gain Alfred's trust and later learns that he has a terminal illness. After failing to convince Selina to leave Gotham due to the Court's plans, she scolds him for his selfishness in comparison with Bruce's heroism. He pushes her out of a window. Her body is later surrounded by cats. Lee suspects Frank died under suspicious circumstances and vows to take down Gordon.
62	18	"Light the Wick"	Mark Tonderai	Tze Chun	May 15, 2017	T13.19918	2.98
Ivy visits Selina in the hospital and uses her plants to heal her injuries; upon waking, she decides to kill Five. Lee rules Frank's death a homicide and attempts to have Gordon questioned but, when she suspects Bullock and Lucius are helping Gordon evade justice, she resigns from the GCPD. The Court kidnaps Barnes and forces Strange, whom they abducted after he cured Fish, to harness the Tetch virus from Barnes' blood. With Strange's assistance, Gordon learns the Court intends to release the virus into Gotham and discreetly works with Cobblepot to prevent a group of socialites from being exposed. Bruce manages to overcome his rage during his training and the Shaman deems him ready to return to Gotham and embrace his power, but all is revealed to be the Court's scheme. Cobblepot is imprisoned in the Court's headquarters with Nygma. After deducing Gordon's betrayal, Kathryn orders Barnes to kill him.
63	19	"All Will Be Judged"	John Behring	Ken Woodruff	May 22, 2017	T13.19919	2.92
Selina attacks Five and exposes his identity to Alfred, but he subdues them and escapes. At a hideout near Gotham, the Shaman purges Bruce of the pain of his parents' deaths and places him under his control, telling him of his mission to destroy the Court and save Gotham. Cobblepot and Nygma reluctantly work together to escape the Court but resume their feud afterward. Learning about Bruce and Five, Gordon and Bullock discover that the Court's crystal owl statues contain maps of marked locations in Gotham. They interrogate Kathryn about Bruce's whereabouts, but Barnes attacks the GCPD and beheads her before she can reveal anything. Gordon shoots off Barnes' left hand; he is captured but escapes again. Using the reassembled owl that Bruce stole, the GCPD finds several locations where Bruce might be. After speaking with Jervis at Arkham and realizing that she is the one to blame for Mario's death, Lee steals a vial of the Tetch virus from the GCPD and injects herself with it.
64	20	"Pretty Hate Machine"	Danny Cannon	Steven Lilien & Bryan Wynbrandt	May 29, 2017	T13.19920	3.03
Lee buries Jim alive in a coffin with his only escape option being the virus. She goes to the GCPD to taunt them and ends up in custody. Jim eventually runs out of oxygen and decides to inject himself and attempt to save the city from the virus attack. The Shaman, who executes the remaining members of the Court for the Wayne murders, prepares Bruce to detonate the bomb from Wayne Enterprises. Alfred interrogates Strange and learns Bruce's location, telling Harvey. Alfred then arrives at Wayne Enterprises and kills the Shaman, who, in his last words, redirects Bruce to "the Demon's Head," while the bomb, which was triggered when the Shaman grabbed Bruce's hand, unleashes the virus across the city. Meanwhile, Cobblepot is deserted by Fries and Bridgit and later attacked by Nygma's party before the former is taken away by Fish.
65	21	"Destiny Calling"	Nathan Hope	Danny Cannon	June 5, 2017	T13.19921	3.17
As the citizens begin to exhibit psychopathic behaviors due to the infection, Fish kidnaps Strange and manages to find the antidote, but she is murdered by Gordon and the antidote is destroyed. A mourning Cobblepot is arrested by the GCPD after being attacked by the League of Shadows. Nygma and Barbara have Tetch, whose blood is needed to formulate an antidote, kidnapped during transfer. They contact city hall and demand a large ransom in exchange for Tetch. However, Gordon secretly contacts Nygma and arranges a deal to trade merely Cobblepot for Tetch. Bruce escapes from police custody when they are overwhelmed by the infected and seeks out the Demon's Head, a.k.a. Ra's Al Ghul, the leader of the League. Ra's has Bruce prove his worth by impaling Alfred with a sword.
66	22	"Heavydirtysoul"	Rob Bailey	Robert Hull	June 5, 2017	T13.19922	3.03
After killing Alfred, Bruce breaks free from his conditioning and turns on Ra's, who escapes after instructing him to revive Alfred with the waters of a mystical well. Barbara's party interrupts Nygma and Gordon's trade. Cobblepot captures Nygma and has him frozen and kept as a trophy. Bruce pushes away Selina when she tries to visit Alfred. Barbara shoots Butch in the head before being electrocuted by Tabitha. Using Tetch's blood, an antidote is synthesized, curing most of the citizens, including Gordon and Lee, who leaves the city and encourages Gordon to continue fighting crime. A comatose Butch is placed in the hospital, where his birth name is revealed as Cyrus Gold. Cobblepot also makes plans to open a new nightclub called the Iceberg Lounge. Tabitha becomes a mentor to Selina and begins teaching her how to use a whip. Bruce is encouraged to make his own decisions by Alfred and becomes a masked vigilante.

== Production ==
=== Development ===
The show was officially renewed by Fox for a 22-episode third season on March 16, 2016. David Madden, Fox's Entertainment President stated, "It takes a very special team to tell the tales of Gotham. For the past two seasons, Bruno, Danny and John have masterfully honored the mythology of Gotham and brought it to life with depth, emotion and memorable high drama."

At 2016 San Diego Comic-Con, executive producer John Stephens explained the structure for the season: "We're doing eleven [episodes] in the Fall, then there's three episodes in January, then the final run of seven or eight episodes in the Spring. [The three] is not a self-contained [series of] episodes, because it extends what we're doing in the Fall, but it is an ended story, so we'll arc it out." Just like the second season, the third season also carried a two subtitles for the season. The first 14 episodes of the season: Mad City; and the other 8 episodes: Heroes Rise. In June 2016, Drew Powell revealed on a tweet the first two episodes of the season.

=== Writing ===
According to Stephens, the structure for the season "We extend [the longer story arcs] in season three. We've made the story even more serialized in season three. Everybody goes through a major character metamorphosis throughout the course of the year."

The fourth episode introduced a political aspect for the show, with critics noting emphasis on Donald Trump's 2016 campaign. Actor Robin Lord Taylor talked about the approach, "I think the Gotham writers are writing our actual reality right now, and that's probably the scariest thing you could possibly imagine. He tries to present himself as he thinks a candidate should look. There is a certain homage to a certain candidate who is out there which is entirely intentional. Our show is like any comic book in that the stories are written to reflect the times in which we live. Comic books are written with that idea in mind, the social climate. So our show is reflecting that."

In August 2016, the producers talked about introducing Harley Quinn into the series despite the character's success in the film Suicide Squad. Executive producer John Stephens explained that they would rather see a "proto-version" of Harley Quinn possibly in the third or fourth season. He also added introducing "proto-versions" of Killer Croc and Solomon Grundy in the show. In January 2017, the producers began to hint about Quinn's appearance in the third-season finale with Stephens claiming that "we might see her in episode 22" and that the character would be the "launching point" for the central plot of season 4 and finally a few days before the episode, David Mazouz claimed the character would appear in the episode. However, Quinn did not appear in the finale; it was confirmed in a June 2017 TVLine article that there were no plans at that time to feature Quinn on the show.

=== Casting ===
On June 13, 2016, it was revealed that Ivy Pepper's character would be promoted to main cast member and the actress would be recast with an older actress. On June 22, 2016, Maggie Geha was cast in the new version, is "due to a brush with one of Hugo Strange's creatures, last seen escaping into the Gotham night at the end of Season 2." John Stephens spoke about this, "The mentality of the Ivy we have in our world is not the same as the Ivy who exists in the canon. She's a bit more of a loose cannon. And so she goes and creates a great deal of havoc in our world. And because she is still a 14-year-old, 15-year-old street teenager in the body of a 25-year-old woman, she doesn't know how to act in the world yet, and so she has to fumble her way about." Stephens also explained why they decided to recast her, "We made the change for two reasons: The character Ivy in the comics, one of her greatest powers is the power of seduction. Everyone was much more comfortable with that with an older actress as opposed to a teenager. We want to explore that classic, canonical power of Ivy. And we didn't just make her older with that attack. When she's changed and transformed, there's a real character change as well. She'll still have some of the same traits, but she'll be much darker, more manipulative than the Ivy we've seen so far. There's a more evil quality to her as well. It's more than just physical."

In June 2016, it was revealed that the Mad Hatter would be appearing in the third season. On July 18, The Walking Dead's vet Benedict Samuel was cast in the role, with the role described as "a talented hypnotist teetering on the edge of madness. He arrives in Gotham with an unwavering desire to find his sister, Alice, a young woman who went missing in the city years ago." On August 23, 2016, Naian Gonzalez Norvind was cast as his sister, Alice, with her role being described as "she has a powerful ability she was born with, that she thinks is a curse and Jervis Tetch aka Mad Hatter, thinks is a gift."

Other additions include Jamie Chung as Valerie Vale, with the role being described as "a crackerjack reporter dead set on uncovering the truth behind Indian Hill. Confident and dogged, she will do anything to get the scoop, and soon sets her sights on Gordon, who she believes is the key lead in her story." The note also revealed that the character is the aunt of fellow comic book character Vicki Vale. 3 days after the cast announcement, James Carpinello was cast as Mario Falcone, son of Carmine Falcone, whose role was described as "Mario has rejected his family's criminal ways and made a legitimate life for himself as a well-respected, Ivy League-educated ER doctor. He's kind, honest and trustworthy, making him the black sheep of the Falcone clan." In November 2016, James Remar was cast as Frank Gordon, Gordon's uncle, in a role that was described as "The elder Gordon left Gotham after Jim's father died, but 25 years later, he's back and looking to reconnect with his nephew. But Frank has a dark secret that will force Jim to choose between saving his family and saving Gotham." Remar is the second Dexter vet to join the show, the first being David Zayas. On January 10, 2017, Raymond J. Barry was announced to have a recurring role in the season as a man only known as the Shaman. His role was described as "a mysterious figure who enters Bruce's (Mazouz) life with the stated intention of unlocking the potential of his own mind." After much speculation, on March 2, 2017, Alexander Siddig was cast to portray Ra's al Ghul. He was described as being the leader behind the Court of Owls and also the leader of the League of Shadows.

=== Design ===
The season also introduces Nygma finally accepting himself as The Riddler and the use of his signature green suit. Series regular Cory Michael Smith had been commenting for over a year that while he hadn't figured out how the costume for the Riddler would be, he was confident it would "certainly be a green suit"; stating that the fittings for the costume were already underway by July 2016. He also added that the new Riddler won't be like the version of Jim Carrey in the film Batman Forever. He claimed, "I want him to be kind of showy. So what we have as the Riddler costume is really classy, and that's kind of what we wanted."

After the winter finale's airing, new images and promos surfaced showcasing Nygma's green suit, signaling his recognition as the imminent Riddler. Smith commented, "When I put it on, we used the same tailors that make all my suits. It was just beautiful, with the black velvet. We have these gorgeous black shoes with just a hint of a purple/maroon thing, just on the shoes. I got really excited, because it was shocking on the rack, but then it was on my body and I was like, 'This feels so right.'" While initially hesitant about by the "glittery green suit", he said it was a happy day when he put on the suit although he has been multiple times hoping for the Riddler's signature cane. He also said about Nygma, "It's his time to declare that he has accepted the role that fate has given him, and he's going to be a villain, wreak havoc and show people that everyone has underestimated him. He started to feel like the world was deciding for him that it wasn't what he deserved or what he's going to have. That potentially could be one of the scariest (aspects), to be very smooth and poised." Executive producer John Stephens said, "The affection he has for tricks and plans and puzzles, it's his way of applying order to what he sees as a disordered universe." Stephens claimed that he saw his progression as a hero's journey rather than a tragedy.

=== Filming ===
Filming for the season began on July 21, 2016, at Steiner Studios in Brooklyn, New York. Ben McKenzie, who portrays Gordon in the show, made his directional debut on the sixteenth episode, "Heroes Rise: These Delicate and Dark Obsessions". According to the releases, the episode was the first of the whole series to make an extensive use of wires during the action scenes. Previous scenes were done practically at the instance of McKenzie, who wanted the show to feel "grounded." McKenzie commented, "They wrote the episode so I was on location in 15, so we could shoot everything in one day. I only missed one day of prep to film as an actor in episode 15, and that allowed me to go through the full process, which, honestly, I've been through before because I've shadowed directors both on Southland and Gotham." He also added, "As a director, you're given a lot of people coming up to you constantly asking for your opinion on everything from which location you should shoot at, how that location should be dressed, props, casting, dialogue."

== Release ==
=== Broadcast ===
The season premiered on Fox on September 19, 2016, and concluded on June 5, 2017, with a two-hour season finale. The season had two breaks between episodes, with a continuous run between them. The first 11 episodes aired from September 19 to November 28, 2016; three episodes aired from January 16 to January 30, 2017; and the final 8 episodes aired from April 24 to June 5, 2017.

=== Marketing ===
In July 2016, the cast and crew attended San Diego Comic-Con to discuss and promote the season and showing the debut trailer for the season.

== Reception ==
On Rotten Tomatoes, the season has a score of 89% based on 158 reviews.

=== Ratings ===
Viewership and ratings per episode of Gotham season 3
No.	Title	Air date	Rating/share (18–49)	Viewers (millions)	DVR (18–49)	DVR viewers (millions)	Total (18–49)	Total viewers (millions)
1	"Better to Reign in Hell..."	September 19, 2016	1.3/4	3.90	0.9	2.24	2.2	6.14
2	"Burn the Witch"	September 26, 2016	1.2/4	3.54	1.0	2.39	2.2	5.93
3	"Look Into My Eyes"	October 3, 2016	1.0/3	3.19	0.8	2.05	1.8	5.24
4	"New Day Rising"	October 10, 2016	1.1/3	3.42	—N/a	1.82	—N/a	5.24
5	"Anything for You"	October 17, 2016	1.2/4	3.32	0.7	1.88	1.9	5.21
6	"Follow the White Rabbit"	October 24, 2016	1.1/4	3.48	0.7	—N/a	1.8	—N/a
7	"Red Queen"	October 31, 2016	1.0/3	3.16	0.8	2.06	1.8	5.22
8	"Blood Rush"	November 7, 2016	1.2/4	3.52	0.8	1.95	2.0	5.47
9	"The Executioner"	November 14, 2016	1.2/4	3.63	0.7	1.82	1.9	5.45
10	"Time Bomb"	November 21, 2016	1.1/4	3.44	0.9	2.06	2.0	5.50
11	"Beware the Green-Eyed Monster"	November 28, 2016	1.0/3	3.37	0.7	1.70	1.7	5.08
12	"Ghosts"	January 16, 2017	1.2/4	3.69	0.7	1.62	1.9	5.31
13	"Smile Like You Mean It"	January 23, 2017	1.2/4	3.60	0.6	—N/a	1.8	—N/a
14	"The Gentle Art of Making Enemies"	January 30, 2017	1.1/4	3.46	0.7	1.63	1.8	5.09
15	"How the Riddler Got His Name"	April 24, 2017	1.0/4	2.99	—N/a	—N/a	—N/a	—N/a
16	"These Delicate and Dark Obsessions"	May 1, 2017	1.0/4	3.02	0.6	—N/a	1.6	—N/a
17	"The Primal Riddle"	May 8, 2017	1.0/4	3.03	0.6	—N/a	1.6	—N/a
18	"Light the Wick"	May 15, 2017	0.9/3	2.98	0.7	1.59	1.6	4.57
19	"All Will Be Judged"	May 22, 2017	1.0/4	2.92	0.6	1.66	1.6	4.59
20	"Pretty Hate Machine"	May 29, 2017	1.0/4	3.03	0.7	1.72	1.7	4.75
21	"Destiny Calling"	June 5, 2017	1.0/4	3.17	0.7	1.67	1.7	4.84
22	"Heavydirtysoul"	June 5, 2017	0.9/4	3.03	0.8	1.75	1.7	4.78
