= Red Queen (Gotham) =

- Gotham episode
- Episode no.: Season 3 Episode 7
- Directed by: Scott White
- Written by: Megan Mostyn-Brown
- Cinematography by: Crescenzo Notarile
- Editing by: Leland Sexton
- Production code: T13.19907
- Original air date: October 31, 2016
- Running time: 41 minutes

Guest appearances
- James Carpinello as Mario Calvi; Leslie Hendrix as Kathryn; Chelsea Spack as Isabella; Happy Anderson as Deever Tweed; Naian Gonzalez Norvind as Alice Tetch; Michael Park as Peter Gordon; Jamie Chung as Valerie Vale

Episode chronology
← Previous "Follow the White Rabbit"	Next → "Blood Rush"
- Gotham season 3

"Red Queen" (also known as "Mad City: Red Queen") is the seventh episode of the third season, and 51st episode overall from the Fox series Gotham. The episode was written by Megan Mostyn-Brown and directed by Scott White. It was first broadcast on October 31, 2016. In the episode, Tetch manages to get an hallucinogen called "Red Queen" that causes damage on people. He pours the hallucinogen on Gordon, sending him on a hallucination trip with Barbara acting as his guide. Tetch is in fact retrieving Alice's blood to create a virus to give it to the founders in their dinner. Meanwhile, Cobblepot sets off to separate Isabella from Nygma, telling her his real nature.

The episode received generally positive reviews, with critics praising Benjamin McKenzie's performance but criticizing the pace and Tetch's plan. CinemaBlend named Gordon's hallucinations as one of the best TV superhero moments on 2016.

== Plot ==
Valerie (Jamie Chung) wakes up in the hospital, Gordon (Ben McKenzie) having been beside her all this time. Valerie deduces that Gordon told Tetch (Benedict Samuel) to kill Lee (Morena Baccarin) because he knew he would do the opposite. Gordon denies this but Valerie says that he loves Lee and as such, they break up. Gordon leaves, not sure if they left on good terms. Meanwhile, Tetch meets with a herbalist to find a potion and is given a potion named "Red Queen", a hallucinogen that caused many people to go into the "loony bin". After being given the Red Queen, Tetch pours the hallucinogen on the herbalist, causing him to experience hallucinations.

Nygma (Cory Michael Smith) and Isabella (Chelsea Spack) continue to bond, making plans to dine at the mayor's office. Nygma realizes that he missed Cobblepot's (Robin Lord Taylor) dinner and departs, after kissing Isabella. Cobblepot has begun to assume that Nygma was kidnapped but is relieved when Nygma arrives. However, Nygma tells him that he is now in love with someone, leaving him shocked and heartbroken. Tetch and the Tweeds arrive at the morgue and retrieve Alice's (Naian Gonzalez Norvind) corpse. Barnes (Michael Chiklis) and Bullock (Donal Logue) arrive at the scene and Gordon is also there to help but is told by Barnes to leave. Gordon then asks Bullock for help. They also find that as Tetch had been near Alice, he is carrying the virus.

Bruce (David Mazouz) prepares dinner for a date with Selina (Camren Bicondova). Cobblepot gets ready for a founders party but Nygma cannot go as he is having a date with Isabella. Barnes is told by Lucius (Chris Chalk) that the rats have been experiencing manic behavior and Tetch could contaminate everyone if he is not caught in time. Tetch has in fact been retrieving Alice's blood for a recipe. Mario (James Carpinello) is angry after having found out what happened in the dinner but Lee calms him down, although he wants Gordon out of their lives. Gordon talks with Lee, who is also deducing that he told to kill her as he knew he would do the opposite. Gordon continues to deny it, upsetting Lee. While visiting Valerie, Gordon spots Tetch and chases him. He finds him on the stairs but Tetch pours the Red Queen on him.

Cobblepot finds the library where Isabella works and purposefully tells her that Nygma was in Arkham Asylum for murder. During the founders' party, Cobblepot runs into Tetch. Gordon's hallucination begins with him in an elevator with Barbara (Erin Richards) acting as his guide, deducing that he could face his inner demons. His first stop is in the GCPD where Bruce tells him that he does not have much time before disappearing. The scene shifts to Gordon and Cobblepot in a battlefield in the precinct. He finds Bruce, who shows him the damage Gordon has done: the deaths of many officers and civilians. Bruce then shoots Gordon and retrieves Martha Wayne's necklace before he falls. Barnes and Bullock interrogate an employee of the lab and Barnes uses his strength to make him reveal that he noticed Tetch with a van. Discovering the date, Barnes and Bullock find that Tetch plans to kidnap the founders. Tetch has already hypnotized everyone to drink the recipe with the virus.

The next stop is on Gordon's dream life where he is married to Lee and they have two children, Frankie and Julie. When he begins to enjoy this dream, everyone disappears. In the founders' party, Cobblepot is talking with Kathryn (Leslie Hendrix), who threatens him and he demands to know who she is. The party is interrupted by Tetch, who forces the founders to drink from the potions. The GCPD arrives before they drink and Barnes brutally attacks Tetch, showing his symptoms and causing Tetch to have a breakdown as he has his sister's blood. Tetch and the Tweeds are arrested and sent to Arkham. In the hospital, nurses find Gordon's body and Mario rushes him to a room for help. Selina arrives late to the date but Bruce is still eager and they begin to dine a cake.

The final stop reunites Gordon with his father, Peter (Michael Park), and they go into a car trip. Peter makes Gordon seem that he is just lost and that needs to find the answer to stop acting like a lone wolf. The hallucinations end as Mario manages to wake him up. Mario leaves but Gordon notices a band-aid in his neck. Isabella goes to Dahl Manor and tells Nygma that she loves him, regardless of his nature and they kiss. Cobblepot runs into them and leaves, heartbroken. Gordon finds his father's ring in his apartment which reads "While we breathe, we shall defend" in Latin. Barnes is in the GCPD, having finished his will when he is visited by Gordon. Gordon asks to be reinstated as detective and Barnes agrees. The final scene shows Kathryn meeting with a man, with both claiming that Cobblepot is still regarded as a criminal. The man is also revealed to have the same ring that Gordon found.

== Production ==
=== Development ===
In October 2016, FOX announced that the seventh episode of the season will be titled "Red Queen" and was to be written by Megan Mostyn-Brown and directed by Scott White. The episode was promoted as the Halloween lineup of FOX, being with Lucifer the last shows to present the lineup.

=== Casting ===
Jessica Lucas, Drew Powell and Maggie Geha do not appear in the episode as their respective characters. In October 2016, it was announced that the guest cast for the episode would include Jamie Chung as Valerie Vale, Chelsea Spack as Isabella, James Carpinello as Mario Calvi, Leslie Hendrix as Kathryn, Naian Gonzalez Norvind as Alice Tetch and Michael Park as Peter Gordon.

== Reception ==
=== Viewers ===
The episode was watched by 3.16 million viewers with a 1.0/3 share among adults aged 18 to 49. This was a 10% decrease in viewership from the previous episode, which was watched by 3.48 million viewers with a 1.1/4 in the 18-49 demographics. With this rating, Gotham ranked second for FOX, behind Lucifer but beating Lucifer in 18-49 demographics, fourth on its timeslot and eight for the night behind Timeless, Scorpion, 2 Broke Girls, Man with a Plan, Kevin Can Wait, Dancing with the Stars, and The Voice.

The episode ranked as the 62nd most watched show on the week. With Live+7 DVR viewing factored in, the episode was watched by 5.21 million viewers and had an overall rating of 1.8 in the 18–49 demographic.

=== Critical reviews ===
Professional ratings
Review scores
Source	Rating
Rotten Tomatoes (Tomatometer)	78%
Rotten Tomatoes (Average Score)	6.8
IGN	7.0
TV Fanatic	4.0/5.0 stars
TV Overmind	4.0/5.0 stars

"Mad City: Red Queen" received generally positive reviews from critics. The episode received a rating of 78% with an average score of 6.8 out of 10 on the review aggregator Rotten Tomatoes.

Matt Fowler of IGN gave the episode a "good" 7.0 out of 10 and wrote in his verdict, "Gotham gave us a nice twist in the form of Gordon's dad possibly being an evil Owl boss, and figured out a way to get Gordon back on the job in an 'adequate' manner using hallucinations, but for the most part 'Red Queen' felt like middling nonsense designed to fill time bell-to-bell."

Nick Hogan of TV Overmind gave the series a star rating of 4 out of 5, writing "All in all, I'm still really enjoying this season of Gotham. While not without its problems, it embraces the wacky world it has created, and, though sometimes dark, is really gripping television."

Sage Young of EW gave the episode a "B" and stated: "It's the day after Jervis Tetch forced Jim Gordon to choose between the two women in his life, and both of them want to talk about what he said. The Mad Hatter's tea party game fulfilled its purpose: Gordon decided who would get the bullet, and Valerie and Lee got the same message. 'You love Lee,' Valerie says to him from her hospital bed. 'Which means we're done.' This very conversation is the reason why Tetch didn't shoot to kill."

Lisa Babick from TV Fanatic, gave a 4.0 star rating out of 5, stating: "Nygmobblepot is pretty much dead, at least it appears that way right now. I don't know why Gotham had to tease us with a possible romance between Nygma and Penguin only to pull it away so quickly. Were the writers just testing the waters to see what the reaction would be? I'm highly disappointed that Gotham decided not to go down that road." Vinnie Mancuso of New York Observer wrote, "I love that Gotham is setting up a love triangle that only one participant is aware of, because it highlights wonderfully the character this particular Penguin has become over three seasons."

MaryAnn Sleasman of TV.com wrote, "The not-so-good: everything else and do not get me started on Penguin's (Robin Lord Taylor) new role as the evil gay man creepily pining for his straight bestie while attempting to sabotage bestie's shiny new hetero hook-up."

Kayti Burt of Den of Geek gave a 3 star rating out of 5 and wrote, "Oh, Gotham. Did you really have to backtrack on so many of the bold choices you have made so far this season? There's still a lot to like about the super trippy 'Red Queen,' but it's tough to see the show bring Jim back to the G.C.P.D. after his time as a freelance bounty hunter has proved so lucrative, backtrack on its bold decision to have Jim choose Vale over Lee, and go all-in with its Vertigo-themed sidelining of the Ed/Oswald relationship."
