= Burn the Witch (Gotham) =

- Gotham episode
- Episode no.: Season 3 Episode 2
- Directed by: Danny Cannon
- Written by: Ken Woodruff
- Cinematography by: Crescenzo Notarile; Christopher Norr
- Production code: T13.19902
- Original air date: September 26, 2016
- Running time: 43 minutes

Guest appearances
- Jada Pinkett Smith as Fish Mooney; B. D. Wong as Dr. Hugo Strange; Leslie Hendrix as Kathryn; Nicholas Calhoun as Nick; Jamie Chung as Valerie Vale

Episode chronology
← Previous "Better to Reign in Hell..."	Next → "Look into My Eyes"
- Gotham season 3

"Burn the Witch" is the second episode of the third season, and 46th episode overall from the Fox series Gotham. The episode was written by executive producer Ken Woodruff and directed by Danny Cannon. It was broadcast on September 26, 2016. In the episode, Bruce comes face to face with the council that wanted him dead. Gordon teams up with Valerie Vale to find Fish Mooney, who is going on a rampage to find the place where Dr. Hugo Strange is held. Meanwhile, Ivy Pepper undergoes into a physical change after the contact with Indian Hills' monster. The episode marks the introduction of Maggie Geha to the series and is credited as a main cast member.

The episode received generally positive reviews from critics, who praised the character development but criticized the tone and the attack in the mansion.

== Plot ==
Bruce (David Mazouz) is brought by Talon to the council's room, meeting the White-Haired Woman (Leslie Hendrix), a woman named Kathryn. Bruce instantly recognizes her as he saw her on Wayne Enterprises events. Kathryn begins to state that their organization controls Wayne Enterprises but Bruce threatens to reveal to the government their involvement and their exposure to the world if he dies. Kathryn is not afraid of the comments and in order to live, she tells him that he needs to stop investigating the council and his parents' murders. He agrees and is then sedated by Talon.

Valerie (Jamie Chung) visits Gordon (Benjamin McKenzie), proposing that they cooperate to find Fish Mooney (Jada Pinkett Smith). Wanting to find Mooney's location, they go with Barbara (Erin Richards) to find her location but she wants Gordon to give her a kiss and leave. This causes Barbara to give the location and tells Gordon of a dream she had where he had an accident, losing his legs and pushing him around a giant babycarriage.

In a shore, Ivy is revealed to be alive and also discovers that her physical body has changed into an older version (Maggie Geha). She is found by a man named Nick (Nicholas Calhoun) and taken to his home for care. The GCPD arrives at a building where Mooney and her gang are squatting. The monsters manage to hold back the police and Mooney and her gang escape. Cobblepot (Robin Lord Taylor) holds a press conference where he criticizes the GCPD and their failure in catching the monsters, earning him popularity with the public. Talon brings Bruce back to Wayne Manor, where he tells Alfred (Sean Pertwee) that the council spared him as long as he stops the investigation.

Fox (Chris Chalk) shows Gordon the body of Peabody and they deduce that she was killed because she couldn't "fix" Mooney and the only other person who could do it is Hugo Strange (B. D. Wong). Bullock (Donal Logue) is abducted by Mooney, leaving his badge behind. She wants him to reveal Strange's location but he refuses, forcing her to seduce him with her powers and a kiss to reveal the location. Gordon and Fox inform Barnes (Michael Chiklis) about her next move and he reveals that Strange is being held in an abandoned mansion turned into a research facility out of Gotham City. Mooney, her gang and Bullock arrive at the facility, kill the officers and find Strange in a high-security glass cell.

While the GCPD surrounds the mansion, Cobblepot and Butch (Drew Powell) lead a horde of people to the mansion, planning on killing the monsters. Gordon sneaks inside and is caught by the monsters and brought to Mooney. He manages to make a deal and spares Bullock's life by helping her escape through the backside. Before the escape, Gordon calls Cobblepot, telling him about Mooney's location and that he needs to send the people through the entrance. Cobblepot agrees and sends the people to burst in the building, killing two of Mooney's gang while everyone escapes. Cobblepot corners Mooney and Strange in the woods, demanding to know why she spared his life. She explains that the best thing she has done was making him into the "Penguin" and she "couldn't destroy that". With this confession, he decides to let them go, before warning Mooney to never come back.

The mob takes out the corpses of the monsters and cheerfully burn them in a fire outside the mansion and hail Cobblepot for his successful effort in stopping them. Ivy knocks out Nick with a plant pot when he decides to throw it out, leaving in a green dress. In Wayne Manor, Bruce and Alfred hear a noise in the study and find Bruce's doppelganger sneaking in, to their shock. Valerie visits Gordon again and begins to deduce what happened in the woods, which culminates in a kiss. At the train station, Lee (Morena Baccarin) is revealed to have arrived at Gotham starting a new life.

== Production ==
=== Development ===
In June 2016, Drew Powell revealed on a tweet that the second episode of the season will be titled "Burn the Witch" and was to be directed by Danny Cannon and written by executive producer Ken Woodruff.

=== Casting ===
On June 13, 2016, it was revealed that Ivy Pepper's character would be promoted to main cast member and the actress would be recast with an older actress. On June 22, 2016, Maggie Geha was cast in the new version, is "due to a brush with one of Hugo Strange's creatures, last seen escaping into the Gotham night at the end of Season 2." John Stephens spoke about this, "The mentality of the Ivy we have in our world is not the same as the Ivy who exists in the canon. She's a bit more of a loose cannon. And so she goes and creates a great deal of havoc in our world. And because she is still a 14-year-old, 15-year-old street teenager in the body of a 25-year-old woman, she doesn't know how to act in the world yet, and so she has to fumble her way about." Camren Bicondova, Cory Michael Smith and Jessica Lucas don't appear in the episode as their respective characters. In September 2016, it was announced that the guest cast for the episode would include Jada Pinkett Smith as Fish Mooney, B. D. Wong as Hugo Strange, Jamie Chung as Valerie Vale, Nicholas Calhoun as Nick, and Leslie Hendrix as Kathryn.

== Reception ==
=== Viewers ===
The episode was watched by 3.54 million viewers with a 1.2/4 share among adults aged 18 to 49, a new series low. This was a 10% decrease in viewership from the previous episode, which was watched by 3.90 million viewers with a 1.3/4 in the 18-49 demographics. With this rating, Gotham ranked second for FOX, behind a presidential debate.

The episode ranked as the 54th most watched show on the week. With Live+7 DVR viewing factored in, the episode had an overall rating of 5.92 million viewers, and a 2.2 in the 18–49 demographic.

=== Critical reviews ===
Professional ratings
Review scores
Source	Rating
Rotten Tomatoes (Tomatometer)	73%
Rotten Tomatoes (Average Score)	6.7
IGN	7.0
TV Fanatic	4.0/5.0 stars
TV Overmind	4.5/5.0 stars

"Mad City: Burn the Witch" received generally positive reviews from critics. The episode received a rating of 73% with an average score of 6.7 out of 10 on the review aggregator Rotten Tomatoes with the consensus stating: "'Burn the Witch' functions as a transitional episode - introducing an iconic villain, tying up some loose threads from last season, and laying the groundwork for intriguing new plot and character arcs for season 3".

Matt Fowler of IGN gave the episode a "good" 7.0 out of 10 and wrote in his verdict, "When I talk about enjoying Gordon's time away from the GCPD, I'm half-joking. I'm just going with the flow here, and the flow is that Gordon is, at best, an irresponsible mess. In 'Burn the Witch,' he made one of the most boneheaded calls on the show so far when he triggered the angry mob so that he could save himself and Harvey. A good friend, sure, but Jim's not exactly the embodiment of justice we've come to expect from the character. At least it was good to see Strange return. And yes, I did kind of like seeing Penguin spare Fish's life. It at least showed us that he's more honorable than Jim (though we knew that)."

Erik Kain of Forbes wrote, "All told, another solid episode of Gotham. Still lots and lots of plot to juggle. Hopefully the writers and showrunners are up for the challenge and can skillfully weave it all together and resolve everything. We still don’t have an established Big Bad this season, which is odd. And like I said up above, there's little indication of where everything is headed exactly."

Nick Hogan of TV Overmind gave the series a star rating of 4.5 out of 5, writing "Overall, I'm extremely impressed with the direction of these first few episodes, and especially 'Burn the Witch'. It was a well executed, well acted episode and I thoroughly enjoyed it."

Sage Young of EW stated: "They don't call it the 'mad city' for nothing. Questions of sanity still abound in Gotham. Questions such as: Why did the Court of Owls chloroform Bruce and kidnap him to a meeting he himself requested? For the aesthetics of it all, probably."

Lisa Babick from TV Fanatic, gave a 4.0 star rating out of 5.0, stating: "Whatever is going on, I think Bruce's story going to be the most interesting of the season. And, it's about time." Vinnie Mancuso of The New York Observer wrote, "So I have a lot of questions about this particular episode of Gotham, most of which revolve around the show aging up Ivy Pepper via sewer magic, I assume because someone finally cracked open a comic book and said 'Wait THAT's Poison Ivy’s super power?? Oh, boy. Oh, no.' But since Ivy and her newfound rosebuds constituted roughly 10 percent of the whole hour, we'll save that conversation for later."

MaryAnn Sleasman of TV.com questioned the episode and Ivy's recast, stating "It's clear that Gotham ultimately determined it simply didn't know what to do with Ivy in the context that it created for her. We've seen her flunk out of the system with Selina, take on a stint growing magic mushrooms, and generally just hovering in the background with that frown on her face and not much else going for her. I just don't know if this recast was the answer."

Robert Yaniz, Jr. of ScreenRant wrote, "Even though Ivy is all evil and wearing a more pronounced shade of green than ever before (maybe she can give Nygma some fashion tips?), she doesn't appear to have developed her poisonous powers just yet. Sure, she's already fighting for the plant world, but we can only speculate how long Gotham will wait to unleash her own abilities. More importantly, now that Poison Ivy is finally starting to become a thing, the clock is ticking until Ivy's comic book love interest Harley Quinn makes her 'official' debut."

Kayti Burt of Den of Geek gave the episode a 2 star rating out of 5 and wrote, "Whatever the answers to these question, I have to admit that this doppelganger storyline is definitely not heading in the direction I thought it would. Not that it's heading in any direction at all, really, at this point. Hopefully, the Doppel-Bruce's collision with the Original-Bruce storyline will move things along. Your move, Master Bruce."
