= Look into My Eyes (Gotham) =

- Gotham episode
- Episode no.: Season 3 Episode 3
- Directed by: Rob Bailey
- Written by: Danny Cannon
- Cinematography by: Crescenzo Notarile
- Editing by: Sarah C. Reeves
- Production code: T13.19903
- Original air date: October 3, 2016
- Running time: 43 minutes

Guest appearances
- John Doman as Carmine Falcone; Richard Kind as Mayor Aubrey James; James Carpinello as Mario Falcone; Naian Gonzalez Norvind as Alice Tetch; Jamie Chung as Valerie Vale

Episode chronology
| ← Previous "Burn the Witch" | Next → "New Day Rising" |
- Gotham season 3

"Look into My Eyes" is the third episode of the third season, and 47th episode overall from the Fox series Gotham. The episode was written by executive producer Danny Cannon and directed by Rob Bailey. It was first broadcast on October 3, 2016. In the episode, hypnotist Jervis Tetch arrives at Gotham City to find his missing sister Alicia and hires Gordon for help. Meanwhile, Cobblepot decides to run for mayor after winning the public's trust. Bruce's doppelganger, "5" begins to imitate him to the point of personification. The episode marks the debut of Benedict Samuel to the show and is credited as a main cast member.

The episode received positive reviews, with critics highlighting Benedict Samuel's performance although Bruce's doppelganger's story received mixed reviews.

== Plot ==
At Sirens Nightclub, Jervis Tetch (Benedict Samuel) performs a hypnosis show to the audience, to Barbara's (Erin Richards) delight but Tabitha's (Jessica Lucas) concern. He selects a man of the audience to be his volunteer after seeing his wife's collar. After performing the hypnosis on the man, he whispers something to him before freeing him from the hypnosis. Barbara questions whether people can do anything he says to which Tetch explains, "only things they secretly wish to do".

At Wayne Manor, Bruce's (David Mazouz) doppelganger reveals to Bruce and Alfred (Sean Pertwee) that he's named "514A" but "5" to be short and that he awoke in Indian Hill over a year ago and they performed tests on him. Bruce decides to let him stay with them although Alfred is worried about him. Having slept with Valerie (Jamie Chung), Gordon (Benjamin McKenzie) goes to the GCPD to collect his bounty. He runs into Lee (Morena Baccarin), who was being offered her previous job back by Barnes (Michael Chiklis). She explains to Jim that she is moving permanently to Gotham with her fiancé, who is a doctor in head trauma in the Gotham General, and she is seeking to join the GCPD again.

That night, the man Tetch hypnotized is awoken by a phone call. The man in the other end is Tetch, who whispers the same words he used and uses it to open the door for him. The man kills his wife under the hypnosis and is then told by Tetch to kill himself while Tetch takes the house for himself as he plans on finding his missing sister, Alice. Alice (Naian Gonzalez Norvind) is revealed to be living with a gift; she has a virus in her blood that kills people. She accidentally kills her landlord when he tries to kiss her.

Mayor James (Richard Kind) announces to the press that he plans on continuing his position as mayor. However, Cobblepot (Robin Lord Taylor) and his mob interrupt the press to criticize the "corrupt" system and Mayor James and announces that he will run for mayor in the new elections. Bruce and Alfred notice scars on "5"'s body and are confused when he bests Alfred in boxing and takes a punch without feeling pain. Tetch visits Gordon, asking for help in finding Alice. He explains that after losing their parents, he took care of her when she began experiencing a rare condition, to which he sought help from Hugo Strange. It revealed a poison in her blood and he took her for "supervision" and never saw her again. After hearing of the Indian Hill breakout, he deduces that she escaped alongside the others. Gordon agrees to find her when he doubles the GCPD's offer.

Cobblepot begins working on his campaign, showing Butch (Drew Powell) that the headquarters are based on Dahl Manor, planning on leaving a legacy for his father. Selina (Camren Bicondova) approaches Bruce for help in locating Ivy but they end up having an argument and she calls Bruce selfish before leaving. "5" watches this and begins to imitate Bruce's voice. Gordon meets Selina to get a clue about Alice. Selina tells him that she saw Alice at Indian Hill and also asks him to find Ivy. He looks in a bar where Alice worked and finds it burned. The owner and some goons arrive and attack him but Gordon manages to beat them. However, he is injured in the head and goes to the hospital for stitches. The doctor stitching him is revealed to be Mario (James Carpinello), Lee's fiancé. He explains that he won't hurt her although Gordon "threatens" to kill him if he ever does so.

Cobblepot meets with James in a restaurant to discuss his campaign. Cobblepot states that James' position is endangering the city and upon threatening him, they are surrounded by both parties' guards. Cobblepot then gives him a patch for his campaign, while planning on having someone help him. Gordon locates Alice's room and finds the landlord in the closet, who attacks him until Alice arrives and kills him. She then burns the corpse as she claims it's infected and flees, claiming she wants nothing to do with Tetch. In Wayne Manor, "5" watches Bruce sleeping and then begins to cut his hair to make it look like Bruce. The next morning, Bruce and Alfred find that he left and took clothes and a car. Cobblepot arrives at Arkham Asylum and threatens the Warden in order to claim that Nygma (Cory Michael Smith) is sane and freed. Nygma is released and picked up by Cobblepot that night.

Tetch performs again in the Sirens, this time causing Barbara to kiss him, stunning Tabitha. Gordon confronts Tetch about Alice's claim so he takes him to the rooftop to talk but Tetch hypnotizes Gordon and sends him to climb on the ledge to fall to his death. Alice arrives and stops him. Tetch tries to talk her down but she shoots him in the shoulder, causing Gordon to awake from the hypnosis. Alice saves Gordon from falling from the roof, afterward, he handcuffs her. Mario and Lee meet to dine with Mario's father, Carmine Falcone (John Doman). "5" drives the car to Selina's location, offering to take her for food. Although noting he is a bit different, she agrees to go with him.

== Production ==
=== Development ===
In September 2016, it was announced that the third episode of the season will be titled "Look Into My Eyes" and was to be directed by Rob Bailey and written by executive producer Danny Cannon.

=== Writing ===
The episode is remarked as a point where the show gets political, with critics noting emphasis on Donald Trump's 2016 campaign. Actor Robin Lord Taylor talked about the approach, "I think the Gotham writers are writing our actual reality right now, and that's probably the scariest thing you could possibly imagine. He tries to present himself as he thinks a candidate should look. There is a certain homage to a certain candidate who is out there which is entirely intentional. Our show is like any comic book in that the stories are written to reflect the times in which we live. Comic books are written with that idea in mind, the social climate. So our show is reflecting that." The episode was originally titled "Misscarrige of Justice".

=== Casting ===
In June 2016, it was revealed that the Mad Hatter would be appearing in the third season. On July 18, The Walking Dead's vet Benedict Samuel was cast in the role, with the role described as "a talented hypnotist teetering on the edge of madness. He arrives in Gotham with an unwavering desire to find his sister, Alice, a young woman who went missing in the city years ago." On August 23, 2016, Naian Gonzalez Norvind was cast as his sister, Alice, with her role being described as "she has a powerful ability she was born with, that she thinks is a curse and Jervis Tetch aka Mad Hatter, thinks is a gift." Chris Chalk and Maggie Geha don't appear in the episode as their respective characters. In September 2016, it was announced that the guest cast for the episode would include Jamie Chung as Valerie Vale, Naian Gonzalez Norvind as Alice Tetch, Richard Kind as Aubrey James, James Carpinello as Mario Falcone, and John Doman as Carmine Falcone.

== Reception ==
=== Viewers ===
The episode was watched by 3.19 million viewers with a 1.0/3 share among adults aged 18 to 49, a series low. This was a 10% decrease in viewership from the previous episode, which was watched by 3.54 million viewers with a 1.2/4 in the 18-49 demographics. With this rating, Gotham ranked second for FOX, behind Lucifer, fourth on its timeslot and eight for the night behind Lucifer, Scorpion, Dancing with the Stars, Timeless, Kevin Can Wait, The Voice, and The Big Bang Theory.

The episode ranked as the 61st most watched show on the week. With Live+7 DVR viewing factored in, the episode had an overall rating of 5.23 million viewers, and a 1.8 in the 18–49 demographic.

=== Critical reviews ===
Professional ratings
Review scores
| Source | Rating |
|---|---|
| Rotten Tomatoes (Tomatometer) | 90% |
| Rotten Tomatoes (Average Score) | 7.5 |
| IGN | 7.6 |
| TV Fanatic | 4.0/5.0 stars |
| TV Overmind | 4.5/5.0 stars |

"Mad City: Look Into My Eyes" received positive reviews from critics. The episode received a rating of 90% with an average score of 7.5 out of 10 on the review aggregator Rotten Tomatoes. The website's critics consensus states, "'Look Into My Eyes' strategically primes viewers for future thrills with a creepy new villain and off-the-wall humor."

Matt Fowler of IGN gave the episode a "good" 7.6 out of 10 and wrote in his verdict, "'Look Into My Eyes' gave us a cool and creepy Mad Hatter, some nice Falcone family surprises, and a politically-minded Penguin. The clone arc is pretty dang dumb, but overall I'm still enjoying the show's use of Gordon. Particularly, here, how his role as a bounty hunter is being woven into the guest villain storyline."

Merrill Barr of Forbes wrote, "Gotham is a strange but tantalizing mess of a show right now. It’s hard to even tell what it’s trying to be anymore. When it began, it was being painted as a depiction of the city’s demise that would ultimately lead to there needing to be a Batman 15 years from now. However, in the pilot, the city was already in ruin and instead of spiraling further, it’s just gotten sillier and sillier."

Nick Hogan of TV Overmind gave the series a star rating of 4.5 out of 5, writing "Ultimately, I found this to be an enjoyable episode. Cobblepot was fantastic, Jim's story was an emotional roller coaster, Leslie & Falcone returned, Nygma was freed, and we met the Mad Hatter. It sounds jam packed, but each story was told with ease and little flash. Very well done."

Sage Young of EW stated: "Over on Fox this Monday night, a career politician who's made some mistakes went head-to-head with an eccentric opportunist who's exploiting the fear of the masses for a position of power. No, you didn't miss the last presidential debate: Oswald Cobblepot has thrown his hat into the ring of Gotham's mayoral race."

Lisa Babick from TV Fanatic, gave a 4.0 star rating out of 5.0, stating: "I'm not getting the Butch/Penguin dynamic at all this season so far. They seem separated, yet Butch is always right there. So how can he not know what's going on? It's just odd. Still, it's pretty exciting that Penguin threw his hat in the ring. In a crap town like Gotham, Penguin does seem like the best choice. He'd certainly add a lot of flavor to the office. But, even more exciting is that Penguin got Nygma out of Arkham. What is Jim going to think about that little tidbit when he finds out?" Drew Grant of New York Observer wrote, "Watching Jim Gordon slowly climb up the police chain with his loyalty and strong morals has been excruciating. All the good intentions in the world do not make you qualified to be a police officer anywhere in the world except Gotham. I'm so glad he's a bounty hunter now!"

MaryAnn Sleasman of TV.com questioned the episode, stating "I want Gotham to return to the crazy creativity that gave us the Maniax early last season, the tragic origins of so many future rogues gallery all-stars, and sure, even Galavan. That doesn't mean replaying the story with a different cast or keeping Fish Mooney (Jada Pinkett Smith) waiting in the wings like some kind of unspoken threat: 'Oh, you don't like Gotham City political drama? Careful, we can always bring this hot mess back.'"

Kayti Burt of Den of Geek gave the episode a 3.5 star rating out of 5 and wrote, "Gotham is at its best when it is doing these two characters well, and tonight's episode — 'Look Into My Eyes' — was the perfect example."
