= Blood Rush =

- Gotham episode
- Episode no.: Season 3 Episode 8
- Directed by: Rob Bailey
- Written by: Tze Chun
- Cinematography by: Christopher Norr
- Editing by: Barrie Wise
- Production code: T13.19908
- Original air date: November 7, 2016
- Running time: 41 minutes

Guest appearances
- John Doman as Carmine Falcone; James Carpinello as Mario Calvi; Chelsea Spack as Isabella/Kristen Kringle; William Abadie as Dr. Maxwell Symon

Episode chronology
← Previous "Red Queen"	Next → "The Executioner"
- Gotham season 3

"Blood Rush" (also known as "Mad City: Blood Rush") is the eighth episode of the third season, and 52nd episode overall from the Fox series Gotham. The episode was written by Tze Chun and directed by Rob Bailey. It was first broadcast on November 7, 2016. In the episode, Barnes (Michael Chiklis) loses control of the effects of Alice Tetch's blood and begins to use his powers to target a killer, no matter the cost of those who stand in his way. Gordon (Ben McKenzie) is reinstated as detective and investigates along with Bullock (Donal Logue) the killer, who uses plastic surgery to fake identities. Meanwhile, Cobblepot (Robin Lord Taylor) tries to stop Isabella from continuing to see Nygma (Cory Michael Smith).

The episode received mixed reviews; while critics praised Chiklis' performance, they criticized that Barnes acting out of character was not compelling, the subplots felt weak and that the overall episode was reminiscent of the first season.

== Plot ==
A man is hiding a corpse in his car near a store. Barnes (Michael Chiklis) passes by and notices blood on the man's face. Barnes follows him to an abandoned building where he sees him melt the corpse, stating he is just a cleaner and was just destroying the corpse for the real killer, someone known as "The Toad". Upon seeing the blood, Barnes begins losing control and, as he realizes that the man would just get a few years in prison, he kills him with his strength.

Before their engagement party, Lee (Morena Baccarin) informs Mario (James Carpinello) that Gordon (Ben McKenzie) is back in the GCPD, but that she is fine with it. Nygma (Cory Michael Smith) and Isabella (Chelsea Spack) are eating breakfast when she uses her glasses, reminding Nygma strongly of Kringle. He goes to the bathroom and sees Kringle in the mirror, teasing him that he is still a killer and it is just a matter of time before he kills Isabella as well. Gordon and Bullock (Donal Logue) are investigating the cleaner's scene, getting shocked after seeing his mutilated corpse.

Barnes visits Tetch (Benedict Samuel) in Arkham Asylum, demanding to know about the virus. Tetch wants to know "the darkness that Alice brought back to life" and he will tell him about the virus. Barnes explains that he expresses rage at the guilty criminals. Tetch instead teases him, stating that he could hear voices from within. Nygma talks with Cobblepot (Robin Lord Taylor) about Isabella, and after some "talk", he decides to break up with her but he asks Cobblepot to do it for him. Barnes tracks The Toad (Gerald Bunsen) to a bar and uses his strength to make him confess to having hired the cleaner but that he was contracted by a person named Dr. Symon, a plastic surgeon who gives new identities to the criminals. Barnes nearly kills him but he takes the Toad with him to find Symon.

Cobblepot arrives at Isabella's, telling her to never see Nygma again. Isabella deduces that he is in love with Nygma too but states that she will not let him go. Barnes arrives at Dr. Symon's (William Abadie) office just as he is beginning surgery on a woman. Symon surrenders but Barnes still attacks him just as voices inside him repeat "Guilty". He takes Symon to the precinct and then leaves his badge and gun on his desk. The engagement party begins, just as Mario says a few words with Falcone (John Doman). Barbara (Erin Richards) is revealed to have gotten inside the party and asks Lee how it feels to be with a man who is having a war with himself. While Fox (Chris Chalk) shows Gordon the toxicology reports on the case of the victim, Bullock informs them that the woman refused to press charges against Symon, seemingly being paid off, and a judge ordered his release.

Attending the party, Barnes talks with Falcone, seeing that even if he did good things, he still ruled the mob and he is not above the law. Symon shows up at the party and the GCPD has arrived to try to imprison him again. Mario talks with Gordon in private and he confronts him that he preferred to save Lee rather than Valerie in the tea party. Gordon calls him weak and Mario punches him in the face but Gordon decides to let it pass just for Lee. Barnes then sees Symon and the voices finally persuade him to say "Guilty". He corners Symon in the bathroom and brutally attacks him, declaring that the law could not let him do what was right, claiming he is the "judge, jury and executioner". He then slams Symon to the wall, causing him to fall off the building.

Nygma visits Isabella, discovering to his shock that she dressed like Kringle, trying to persuade him that he can live without fear of hurting her. She puts his hand on her throat to show him that he won't strangle her and they end up making out. Nygma tells Cobblepot about this and after leaving, Cobblepot has Gabriel cut the brakes of Isabella's car, causing her to crash just as a train is crossing. Gordon leaves the party after talking with Barnes and discovers Symon, who is nearing death. Gordon asks who threw him off, and Symon responds, "Barnes".

== Production ==
=== Development ===
In September 2016, it was announced that the eighth episode of the season will be titled "Blood Rush" and was to be written by Tze Chun and directed by Rob Bailey.

=== Casting ===
David Mazouz, Sean Pertwee, Camren Bicondova, Jessica Lucas, Drew Powell and Maggie Geha don't appear in the episode as their respective characters. In October 2016, it was announced that the guest cast for the episode would include James Carpinello as Mario Calvi, Chelsea Spack as Isabella, John Doman as Carmine Falcone, William Abadie as Dr. Maxwell Symon and Gerald Bunsen as The Toad.

== Reception ==
=== Viewers ===
The episode was watched by 3.52 million viewers with a 1.2/4 share among adults aged 18 to 49. This was an 11% increase in viewership from the previous episode, which was watched by 3.16 million viewers with a 1.0/3 in the 18-49 demographics. With this rating, Gotham ranked second for FOX, behind Lucifer but beating Lucifer in 18-49 demographics, fourth on its timeslot and seventh for the night behind 2 Broke Girls, Man with a Plan, Dancing with the Stars, Kevin Can Wait, the 2016 SNL Election Special, and The Voice.

The episode ranked as the 65th most watched show on the week. With Live+7 DVR viewing factored in, the episode was watched by 5.46 million viewers and had an overall rating of 2.0 in the 18–49 demographic.

=== Critical reviews ===
Professional ratings
Review scores
Source	Rating
Rotten Tomatoes (Tomatometer)	57%
Rotten Tomatoes (Average Score)	5.2
IGN	7.2
TV Fanatic	2.5/5.0 stars
TV Overmind	4.5/5.0 stars

"Mad City: Blood Rush" received mixed reviews from critics. The episode received a rating of 57% based on reviews from 12 critics, with an average score of 5.2 out of 10 on the review aggregator Rotten Tomatoes.

Matt Fowler of IGN gave the episode a "good" 7.2 out of 10 and wrote in his verdict, "'Blood Rush' shined a bright spotlight on Barnes for the first time since his introduction (and the insta-failure that was Strike Force). I like that he's been spun into the show's new villain, and how it also feels like a natural "Mad City" extension of the Hatter arc, though it's still hard to buy that a guy like Barnes would have let his condition get so out of control. Meanwhile, the Isabella storyline offered up nothing new this week other than Penguin's desire to get rid of her, no matter the method."

Nick Hogan of TV Overmind gave the series a star rating of 4.5 out of 5, writing "With the possibility that Nygma will be part of repetitive history taken into account, this was still an excellent episode. Embracing the insanity of Gotham and its occupants has been a real strong point for the show, and I'm excited to see it continue."

Sage Young of EW gave the episode a "B" and stated: "Thanks to his Red Queen trip, James Gordon has reconnected with his family's motto of service: 'While we breathe, we shall defend.' When he walks through the door of the precinct — hair slicked back and tie in place — Gordon is greeted with a familiar sight: the GCPD juggling a parade of lowlifes and career criminals. But his perspective on the job has changed. Instead of seeing himself as one man standing against a hurricane of death and crime, he sees himself as his dad: coming home from work every day satisfied that he's at least done his part as a good man in a troubled city. Jim Gordon is a cop again, and something tells me this time, it'll stick. (Canon. Canon tells me that.)"

Lisa Babick from TV Fanatic, gave a 2.5 star rating out of 5, stating: "Other than Barnes going dark, the rest of the hour made no sense. It's disappointing that once again. Gotham started the season out strong, but then took a nosedive not even half way through. Why can't we have any consistency on this show? Why couldn't we just have had an hour focused on Barnes and nothing else? It would have been much more entertaining." Vinnie Mancuso of The New York Observer wrote, "That's right, 'Blood Rush' centered around Gotham's resident Humpty Dumpty, Captain Nathaniel Barnes, who all the king's horses and all the king's men can't stop from becoming a veiny rage-monster because some girl's poison blood fell into his eyeball. Just like the nursery rhyme says. Look it up. I'm nailing this."

MaryAnn Sleasman of TV.com wrote, "Penguin and Nygma's complex and deliciously tragic relationship could have been a high point in a season that sorely needs one, but that would have required nuance and after three seasons, I can't make excuses anymore -- Gotham just can't do it."

Robert Yanis, Jr. of Screenrant wrote, "Gotham may have temporarily put a pin in its Mad Hatter storyline last week, but the 'Mad City' still has plenty of wild cards still in play."

Kayti Burt of Den of Geek gave a 2 star rating out of 5 and wrote, "On a show that once saw someone bazooka someone else, it's hard to sit through an entire episode semi-dedicated to an awkward engagement party."
