= Anything for You (Gotham) =

- Gotham episode
- Episode no.: Season 3 Episode 5
- Directed by: TJ Scott
- Written by: Denise Thé
- Cinematography by: Crescenzo Notarile
- Editing by: Barrie Wise
- Production code: T13.19905
- Original air date: October 17, 2016
- Running time: 43 minutes

Guest appearances
- James Andrew O'Connor as Tommy Bones; Michael Stoyanov as Red Hood Gang Leader; Jamie Chung as Valerie Vale; Anthony Carrigan as Victor Zsasz

Episode chronology
← Previous "New Day Rising"	Next → "Follow the White Rabbit"
- Gotham season 3

"Anything for You" is the fifth episode of the third season, and 49th episode overall from the Fox series Gotham. The episode was written by consulting producer Denise Thé and directed by TJ Scott. It was first broadcast on October 17, 2016. In the episode, Oswald Cobblepot's first days as mayor are threatened when the newly emerged Red Hood comes back to spread chaos and challenge his authority. Edward Nygma makes a new discovery while being reinstated at the GCPD as a liaison in the case while Bruce Wayne and Jim Gordon set off to find Ivy Pepper, still not aware that she has grown up physically.

The episode received acclaim from critics and fans, who praised the writing, themes and performances by Robin Lord Taylor, Cory Michael Smith and Drew Powell.

== Plot ==
Oswald Cobblepot (Robin Lord Taylor) begins his new mayor position with serving food to the homeless and opening a new school, helped by Edward Nygma (Cory Michael Smith) although Butch Gilzean (Drew Powell) is feeling overshadowed. He also shows to the public a statue of his late mother, feeling that she would be proud of him. However, the ceremony is interrupted by the Red Hood Gang, who shoot the statue and then dislodge the statue's head, threatening that Gotham is not safe of them and escape.

Captain Barnes (Michael Chiklis) is getting worried of reports about Alice Tetch's blood being contaminated and is told by Harvey Bullock (Donal Logue) about the Red Hood Gang, agreeing that they are copying the same style as the previous gang. The GCPD is surprised when Nygma appears, assuming the role of liaison on the Red Hoods and strong-arms Barnes with the threat of a new commissioner to replace him. However, when trying to reconnect with Lee Thompkins, she punches him in retaliation for murdering Kristen Kringle and uses her new connection to the Falcone syndicate to warn him against further intrusion. Cobblepot assembles the gangs, including Victor Zsasz (Anthony Carrigan) and Tommy Bones (James Andrew O'Connor) to find and kill the Red Hood gang while he celebrates his victory at the Sirens. The Red Hood Gang are playing in their hideout when they are approached by their boss, revealed to be Butch.

Bruce Wayne (David Mazouz) visits Jim Gordon (Benjamin McKenzie), asking for help in finding Ivy for Selina Kyle (Camren Bicondova). Gordon meets with Bullock in the GCPD and find that Ivy's sweater was found but everyone tells them that the woman was in her 20s, not knowing that she was affected. The Red Hood gang begin making chaos in Gotham and are given suits to go to the party at Sirens. However, Barbara Kean (Erin Richards) and Tabitha Galavan (Jessica Lucas) have found the location and ambush them.

Butch explains to Barbara and Tabitha that he used the Red Hood gang to cause chaos and that he would then kill the gang in the party so that he could be Cobblepot's right-hand man again. Barbara and Tabitha promise not to tell anyone but make him owe them. Butch decides to fire the Red Hood Gang in their factory but just then, Cobblepot and Nygma are arriving so he decides to kill the gang. Butch is then praised as a hero by Cobblepot and the media. The GCPD investigates the scene but decides to close the case. However, Nygma notes various inaccuracies in the scene. Barnes asks Lee about Alice's blood to know if it was infected. She explains that the blood was tested on 3 rats; two of them showed strength but the other one killed them, worrying him.

The party at the Sirens takes place with Bruce and Alfred Pennyworth (Sean Pertwee) visiting and congratulating him. Selina is also at the party, stealing wallets. She is caught by Ivy (Maggie Geha), although Selina does not recognize her. Nygma confronts Butch, stating that he discovered he was the leader of the Red Hood gang as he contacted the tailor who made the suits. Butch attacks, but Nygma proposes that both of them team up to kill Cobblepot (because as Nygma says, he was not freed "to be number two") and then share the city, and for this, Butch will don the Red Hood mask. Butch refuses, so Nygma has Zsasz hold Tabitha at gunpoint until Butch dons the mask. While Cobblepot gives a speech, Butch shoots, but the bullets are revealed to be blanks as Nygma was just using him to get him busted. Held at gunpoint and Oswald's outrage, Butch finally roars that Cobblepot's machinations ruined his life, even after he gave him his loyalty. When Tabitha bursts in with a stabbed henchmen, Butch breaks free and chokes Nygma, forcing Cobblepot to break a bottle on his head to save Nygma. Nygma was unconscious for a few minutes but woke up much to Penguin's relief.

Bruce takes Selina to the rooftop to say that he is investigating Ivy's disappearance and that he likes her, prompting her to kiss him. Valerie Vale (Jamie Chung) meets with a medical examiner who tested Alice's blood, but as he becomes flirty with her, Gordon arrives and kicks out the examiner as they both have a date. Cobblepot tends to Nygma, who explains that he did not tell him the plan as he needed him to be genuine so the people would believe it and they both embrace, acknowledging their friendship. Tabitha later hijacks the ambulance carrying Butch, to which Barnes reacts angrily but finds that he no longer has to walk with his crutch as his veins change again. Jervis Tetch (Benedict Samuel) is revealed to have kidnapped another woman, treating her like Alice and then killing her. He then writes a note with her blood that leaves in the table saying "James Gordon" while stating "Those who hurt you will feel my pain when my sweet and terrible vengeance upon them rains".

== Production ==
=== Development ===
In September 2016, it was announced that the fifth episode of the season will be titled "Anything for You" and was to be written by consulting producer and Person of Interest veteran Denise Thé and directed by TJ Scott.

=== Casting ===
All actors appear in the episode as their respective characters. In September 2016, it was announced that the guest cast for the episode would include Jamie Chung as Valerie Vale, Michael Stoyanov as the Red Hood leader and James Andrew O'Connor as Tommy Bones.

== Reception ==
=== Viewers ===
The episode was watched by 3.32 million viewers with a 1.2/4 share among adults aged 18 to 49. This was a 3% decrease in viewership from the previous episode, which was watched by 3.42 million viewers with a 1.1/3 in the 18-49 demographics. With this rating, Gotham ranked second for FOX, behind Lucifer but beating Lucifer in 18-49 demographics, fourth on its timeslot and eight for the night behind Scorpion, 2 Broke Girls, Timeless, Dancing with the Stars, Kevin Can Wait, The Voice, and The Big Bang Theory.

The episode ranked as the 60th most watched show on the week. With Live+7 DVR viewing factored in, the episode had an overall rating of 5.20 million viewers, and a 1.9 in the 18–49 demographic.

=== Critical reviews ===
Professional ratings
Review scores
Source	Rating
Rotten Tomatoes (Tomatometer)	100%
Rotten Tomatoes (Average Score)	9.0
IGN	7.8
TV Fanatic	5.0/5.0 stars
TV Overmind	4.0/5.0 stars

"Mad City: Anything for You" received mostly positive reviews from critics. The episode received a rating of 100% with an average score of 9.0 out of 10 on the review aggregator Rotten Tomatoes.

Matt Fowler of IGN gave the episode a "good" 7.8 out of 10 and wrote in his verdict, "Gotham calmed down a bit this week (by Gotham standards, anyhow) and gave us a decent episode involving characters in love, or on the cusp of love. Commitment and betrayal were prevalent themes here as Butch sought to get back in his boss's good graces, only to wind up being the reason Oswald and Ed grew closer together."

Eric Kain of Forbes wrote, "All told, another great episode. The season is really starting to take shape, with the Mad Hatter set up as the Big Bad, and the plottings of Ed Nygma both shaping up into great narratives."

Nick Hogan of TV Overmind gave the series a star rating of 4.0 out of 5, writing "I very much enjoyed this episode. It hasn't been as off-the-wall nuts as some of these others have been (in a good way, of course), but it was a strong, emotional episode."

Sage Young of EW gave the episode an "A−" and stated: "Heavy hangs the head that wears the crown, and all that. Oswald Cobblepot can't even enjoy his little victory party without being the target of several overlapping schemes. That said, it was awfully fun to get most of our cast in a room together, even if the floor of that room ended up showered in blood and broken glass. All's fair in love and politics, especially where Edward Nygma and the Penguin are concerned."

Lisa Babick from TV Fanatic, gave a perfect 5 star rating out of 5, stating: "Without a doubt Gotham Season 3 Episode 5 was the best hour of Gotham to date. Dare I say even better than the Jerome episodes? Yes. Yes, it was." Vinnie Mancuso of The New York Observer wrote, "Overall, really, 'Anything for You' was a surprisingly low-key episode of Gotham that was still filled with small, delightful moments. It featured one of the series' only face-to-face conversations between Alfred and Oswald, in which Sean Pertwee delivered an Emmy-worthy pronunciation of the word 'bazooka.' It featured Eddie making his return to the GCPD strictly to talk the troll-iest of shit to the entire police forces' faces, only to get molly-walloped in the chin by Leslie Thompkins. It featured Captain Barnes, fresh off an eye full of Alice blood, slowly morphing into Solomon Grundy (if the scripts I've been sending to Bruno Heller's home address unsolicited turn out to be true, that is)."

Megan Vick of TV.com wrote, "Penguin's (Robin Lord Taylor) and Nygma's (Cory Michael Smith) bromance on Gotham has reached epic heights, which is great for the fans that love them, but the worst possible news for Butch (Darren Powell)."

Kayti Burt of Den of Geek wrote, "'Anything For You' proved that Gotham doesn't have to give up its nihilistic undertones, mad-hat plot shenanigans, or comic villainy to give us characters who care about one another and who we, therefore, care about. It makes for a better, more complex show. Keep up the good work, Gotham."
