= New Day Rising (Gotham) =

- Gotham episode
- Episode no.: Season 3 Episode 4
- Directed by: Eagle Egilsson
- Written by: Robert Hull
- Cinematography by: Cristopher Norr
- Editing by: Leland Sexton
- Production code: T13.19904
- Original air date: October 10, 2016
- Running time: 43 minutes

Guest appearances
- Leslie Hendrix as Kathryn; Naian Gonzalez Norvind as Alice Tetch; Adam Petchel as Dumfree Tweed; Happy Anderson as Deever Tweed

Episode chronology
← Previous "Look into My Eyes"	Next → "Anything for You"
- Gotham season 3

"New Day Rising" is the fourth episode of the third season, and 48th episode overall from the Fox series Gotham. The episode was written by co-executive producer Robert Hull and directed by Eagle Egilsson. It was first broadcast on October 10, 2016. In the episode, Gordon is now looking for Jervis Tetch, planning on using his sister, Alice, to find him. Bruce and Alfred go after Five, who is now impersonating him and is with Selina. The mayoral race day arrives and Cobblepot is ready to win the public's vote but Nygma discovers how he got there.

The episode received positive reviews, with critics praising the political storyline and Samuel's performance.

== Plot ==
In the interrogation room, Alice (Naian Gonzalez Norvind) explains to Bullock (Donal Logue) that Tetch (Benedict Samuel) held her captive and after escaping, she fled to Gotham, where Hugo Strange locked her up. However, Bullock is adamant in believing her as she killed her landlord. Tetch is revealed to be operating on an abandoned amusement park, planning on using it to bring Alice and then kills the owner as it's a "private affair".

The election day arrives in Gotham and despite Cobblepot's (Robin Lord Taylor) delight, Butch (Drew Powell) and Nygma (Cory Michael Smith) conflict about their involvement. Barnes (Michael Chiklis) has Lee (Morena Baccarin) test Alice's blood to find out her condition. Alice explains to Lee that Tetch is an expert with the mind and those who get affected by him, will die. Gordon is walking on the street when suddenly, the sounds near him show the same rhythm of Tetch's hypnosis and steps on the street to be hit by a truck when he is saved at the last moment by a man.

Bruce (David Mazouz) and Alfred (Sean Pertwee) find that the car was towed in the Narrows, deducing that Five is with Selina (Camren Bicondova). Selina leaves Five for a moment to rob a bar but she is captured and nearly has a finger cut off when Five arrives and uses his strength to take them down. When seeing his scars, she discovers his identity. While stitching his wound, Five kisses her. During one of Cobblepot's press conferences, Nygma notices Butch giving an envelope with money to a campaign official. He checks the envelope and decides to let the man go but Butch tells his men to follow Nygma. Cobblepot knows this but does not want to risk his campaign. When Nygma tricks him with a little girl, Cobblepot tells him to stay out of his campaign.

Gordon goes with Barbara (Erin Richards) to find Tetch, discovering he took some wrestlers. Tetch finds the known wrestlers, "The Terrible Tweeds" and subjects them to his hypnosis. Gordon talks with Alice, who states that the resembling of the ticking will trigger him and that she has been under control of him for years where he put thoughts on her head. Tetch has the Tweed Brothers attack the GCPD, prompting Gordon to escape with Alice. However, Tetch uses his ticking in Gordon to catch Alice and escaping. He is saved of shooting himself by Barnes, who knocks him down. The Young Tweed Brother (Ari Barkan) is arrested and detained at the GCPD. Bruce and Alfred find Five but Five confronts Bruce about not knowing what to want and decides to leave them and Selina forever by jumping from the rooftop and running off in the streets.

Gordon wakes up handcuffed in the hospital room, where Lee is watching over him. Gordon confronts her about moving on but she justifies what she did, stating that Mario was always there for her when needed. With two of the brothers dead, the young Tweed brother is interrogated by Bullock who gets him to reveal where Tetch has taken Alice by threatening to destroy his fallen brothers' masks. Bullock frees Gordon and takes him to the amusement park, where Tetch has been injecting Alice to sustain her blood to infect a fountain to create more monsters. Gordon and Bullock arrive but Tetch again uses the ticking to control Gordon. Remembering Lee's words on moving on, Gordon frees himself from the hypnosis and shoots at the two Tweed brothers. Tetch tries to control Alice, but when she attempts to escape, she accidentally falls from the floor and is fatally impaled. Tetch escapes, heartbroken.

While waiting the election results, a furious Butch holds Nygma at gunpoint, discovering that he took away the officials' money and the campaign is now ended. Cobblepot decides to have him killed until he finds that he has won the elections and lets him live, seeing that the people really wanted him. He is sworn as mayor and names Nygma his chief of staff, to his surprise. Five is intercepted by Kathryn (Leslie Hendrix), who is now planning on using him as Bruce and has him sedated and captured. While inspecting the scene, Barnes is accidentally touched by Alice's blood, causing his eyes and veins to change.

== Production ==
=== Development ===
In September 2016, it was announced that the fourth episode of the season will be titled "New Day Rising" and was to be written by co-executive producer Robert Hull and directed by Eagle Egilsson.

=== Casting ===
Jessica Lucas, Chris Chalk, and Maggie Geha don't appear in the episode as their respective characters. In September 2016, it was announced that the guest cast for the episode would include Naian Gonzalez Norvind as Alice Tetch, and Leslie Hendrix as Kathryn.

== Reception ==
=== Viewers ===
The episode was watched by 3.42 million viewers with a 1.1/3 share among adults aged 18 to 49. This was a 7% increase in viewership from the previous episode, which was watched by 3.19 million viewers with a 1.0/3 in the 18–49 demographics. With this rating, Gotham ranked second for FOX, behind Lucifer but beating Lucifer in 18–49 demographics, fourth on its timeslot and eight for the night behind Scorpion, Timeless, Dancing with the Stars, 2 Broke Girls, Kevin Can Wait, The Voice, and The Big Bang Theory.

The episode ranked as the 68th most watched show on the week. With Live+7 DVR viewing factored in, the episode had an overall rating of 5.24 million viewers, and a 1.8 in the 18–49 demographic.

=== Critical reviews ===
Professional ratings
Review scores
Source	Rating
Rotten Tomatoes (Tomatometer)	100%
Rotten Tomatoes (Average Score)	8.5
IGN	7.3
TV Fanatic	5.0/5.0 stars
TV Overmind	4.0/5.0 stars

"Mad City: New Day Rising" received positive reviews from critics. The episode received a rating of 100% with an average score of 8.5 out of 10 on the review aggregator Rotten Tomatoes.

Matt Fowler of IGN gave the episode a "good" 7.3 out of 10 and wrote in his verdict, "Oswald got fast tracked into the Mayor's office while Bruce's cloneboy made a move on Selina - which then seemed to light a fire under Bruce regarding his feelings for her. It was all somewhat disposable save for the focus on Jim Gordon's underlying self-loathing and how it caused Hatter's suicide trigger to stick with him. That was a really cool way to draw Jim's brokenness out into the open for discussion - and maybe resolution."

Erik Kain of Forbes wrote, "Another good episode in a slow-burning season. I'm still not a huge fan of New Gordon (nobody seems to be in Gotham either) and I miss some of the Good Cop vs. Corrupt City tension from earlier seasons. In fact, I miss that a lot though I'm not sure how to get it back. I also miss the more buddy-cop focused episodes with Gordon and Harvey taking center stage together. Harvey (and by extension Donal Logue) feels a bit wasted lately."

Nick Hogan of TV Overmind gave the series a star rating of 4.0 out of 5, writing "That said, the rest of the episode was well-balanced and structured. Even though I was apprehensive about the Bruce Clone saga when it first began, I was satisfied with the way it turned out in the short term. Not to mention I saw it coming a mile away when the cronies behind Wayne Industries turned out to be behind clone Bruce. I always enjoy watching Bruce with Selina, too, if for no other reason than David Mazouz and Camren Bicondova are two of the best young actors on television today."

Sage Young of EW stated: "Everyone just wants to be wanted. Love is in the air on Gotham, in its best and worst forms. Jim and Lee are struggling to find what comes after it. Penguin seeks out the adoration of the masses. One lonely clone of Bruce Wayne comes to understand that he's missed out on the most bittersweet facet of the human experience. And if Jervis Tetch's love won't be returned willingly, he'll have to force it."

Lisa Babick from TV Fanatic, gave a perfect 5 star rating out of 5.0, stating: "Wow. Just wow. There was so much that happened on Gotham Season 3 Episode 4, I'm not even sure where to begin. It's going to be interesting to see how this story plays out. Bruce better hurry and grow up, because if the Court of Owls have their way, Bruce's days are numbered." Vinnie Mancuso of New York Observer wrote, "Listen, I'm not here to heavily analyze the fact Gotham – a Batman prequel that once devoted an entire episode to balloon-themed murder – is pulling off a surprisingly deep (and oddly tender) look at modern day America, and a person running for office not because he wants to serve but because he's an applause-fueled carnival barker that feels 'wanted' for the first time, but... well here we are. Sometimes you have to tip your hat, even when it's mad."

MaryAnn Sleasman of TV.com wrote, "'New Day Rising' also gave us a truce on the Jim/Lee/Mario love triangle front and a surprisingly sweet resolution to the Bruce/Fake Bruce/Selina drama. They are far from over, given that we've barely scratched the surface of Mario's (James Carpinello) mob connections and Fake Bruce was conveniently picked up by Bruce's nemesis on the board of directors/secret Court of Owls loony, to most likely be programmed in whatever crime against humanity popped up to replace Indian Hill."

Kayti Burt of Den of Geek gave the episode a 3 star rating out of 5 and wrote, "'New Day Rising' brought a tragic conclusion to the current Mad Hatter/Alice arc, let us get to know Doppel-Bruce just a little bit more, and elected a new mayor of Gotham. Here's everything that went down in tonight's Gotham..."
