= These Delicate and Dark Obsessions =

- Gotham episode
- Episode no.: Season 3 Episode 16
- Directed by: Ben McKenzie
- Written by: Robert Hull
- Cinematography by: Christopher Norr
- Editing by: Leland Sexton
- Production code: T13.19916
- Original air date: May 1, 2017
- Running time: 43 minutes

Guest appearances
- John Doman as Carmine Falcone; Leslie Hendrix as Kathryn; James Remar as Frank Gordon; Raymond J. Barry as The Shaman

Episode chronology
← Previous "How the Riddler Got His Name"	Next → "The Primal Riddle"
- Gotham season 3

"These Delicate and Dark Obsessions" is the sixteenth episode of the third season, and 60th episode overall from the Fox series Gotham. The show is itself based on the characters created by DC Comics set in the Batman mythology. The episode was written by co-executive producer Robert Hull and directed by main cast member Ben McKenzie, making his directorial debut. It was first broadcast on May 1, 2017. During the broadcast of the episode, a trailer for the film Wonder Woman was featured.

In the episode, the Court is now planning its next move with Gotham City, this time, they are bringing in a weapon in order to destroy the city, seeing it is beyond salvation. Seeing this, Frank meets with Gordon in order to avoid the weapon from getting to Gotham but Gordon then discovers more information regarding his father's murder and those involved with him. Meanwhile, Bruce is met by a Shaman in his cell, who brings him to a journey of spiritualism in the form of memories, this time with his parents' murder. Also, Cobblepot wakes up and he and Ivy face off against people who want him dead.

The episode received generally positive reviews, with critics praising McKenzie's directing and Cobblepot's and Ivy's chemistry although the rest of the subplots received more criticism.

== Plot ==
The Court gathers to discuss the recent events in Gotham, which led to them getting a weapon in order to destroy the city. This is then decided by a unanimous vote. Back in his cell, Bruce is awakened by an old Shaman (Raymond J. Barry), warning him that no one will notice his absence while he remains here. He asks for his help in something he has been working.

While Mayor James is reinstated, Gordon (Ben McKenzie) is investigating Michael Ness, the supposed drunk driver who killed his father. He finds that he had chronic persistent hepatitis and Bullock (Donal Logue) adds that if he had this disease, then he would not be able to drink. Gordon then meets with Frank (James Remar), who tells him about the weapon but admits that he does not know what it is. He is then noticed that Ness's lawyer was paid by Carmine Falcone (John Doman). Meanwhile, Cobblepot (Robin Lord Taylor) is attended by Ivy (Maggie Geha) and he asks her to gather Gabe and many of his men in order to take back his power.

Ivy distrusts Gabe but Cobblepot shrugs her off, calling her a freak, causing her to storm off. However, Gabe knocks out Cobblepot. Back on the mountains, Bruce's cell door opens and he tries to escape, only to discover he is in a maze. He is then summoned by the Shaman, who puts an acupuncture needle on his forehead to revive the moment his parents got killed. After the revival, he is told by the Shaman to rest as they will continue later. Gordon confronts Falcone at his house, demanding to know the name of the person who ordered the hit on his father and Falcone reveals that Frank is the one who did that.

Gordon then confronts Frank, who admits ordering the hit because Peter threatened to expose the Court. Gordon tries to arrest him but Frank resists, telling him the location where the weapon will be while he will try to buy some time. Seeing no option, Gordon asks Barbara (Erin Richards) to interrogate a worker at the docks. The worker reveals they retrieved an item the past week, this is an Indian Hill crate. A Talon arrives and kills their henchmen but Barbara and Tabitha (Jessica Lucas) escape. Talon then kills the worker. Frank meets with Kathryn (Leslie Hendrix) and the Court, revealing that Gordon knows about his involvement. He is then given the order to kill Gordon.

Ivy is also captured and tied next to Cobblepot. While Gabe and his men are distracted, Ivy seduces one of the men with her powers, compelling him to kill everyone but Gabe and free them. He then confronts Gabe with Ivy's powers, and he reveals that he never was loyal to him and he and his men only followed him out of fear and that everyone still sees him as the "umbrella boy". Angered, Cobblepot kills Gabe with a gardening tool. Cobblepot then asks for help in rebuilding his army and Ivy recalls that Selina told them about the monsters at Indian Hill and she proposes that he carries an "army of freaks". Gordon meets with Frank, who tells him that the Court no longer trusts him and he needs Gordon to join the Court to stop it and finish what his father started. To ensure his plan, Frank shoots himself in the head. Bruce is then sent into reviving his parents' murder and is told by the Shaman that the pain will block from what he needs to become: a protector. He needs to become a symbol against fear so "Gotham can be reborn". Gordon visits his father's grave and receives a call from Kathryn, where he takes the blame for killing Frank and asks to meet her. A limo is waiting for him in the street and he enters.

== Production ==
=== Development ===
In April 2017, it was announced that the sixteenth episode of the season will be titled "These Delicate and Dark Obsessions" and was to be written by co-executive producer Robert Hull and directed by main cast member Ben McKenzie.

According to the releases, the episode was the first of the entire series to make an extensive use of wires during the action scenes. Previous scenes were done practically at the insistence of McKenzie, who wanted the show to feel "grounded." McKenzie commented, "They wrote the episode so I was on location in 15, so we could shoot everything in one day. I only missed one day of prep to film as an actor in episode 15, and that allowed me to go through the full process, which, honestly, I've been through before because I've shadowed directors both on Southland and Gotham." He also added, "As a director, you're given a lot of people coming up to you constantly asking for your opinion on everything from which location you should shoot at, how that location should be dressed, props, casting, dialogue."

=== Casting ===
On January 10, 2017, Raymond J. Barry was announced to have a recurring role in the season as a man only known as the Shaman. His role was described as "a mysterious figure who enters Bruce's (Mazouz) life with the stated intention of unlocking the potential of his own mind." Sean Pertwee, Camren Bicondova, Cory Michael Smith, Chris Chalk, Drew Powell, Benedict Samuel, and Michael Chiklis don't appear in the episode as their respective characters. In April 2017, it was announced that the guest cast for the episode would include James Remar as Frank Gordon, John Doman as Carmine Falcone, Raymond J. Barry as the Shaman, and Leslie Hendrix as Kathryn.

== Reception ==
=== Viewers ===
The episode was watched by 3.02 million viewers with a 1.0/4 share among adults aged 18 to 49. This was a slight increase in viewership from the previous episode, which was watched by 2.99 million viewers with a 1.0/4 in the 18-49 demographics. With this rating, Gotham ranked second for FOX, behind Lucifer, fourth on its timeslot and seventh for the night behind a Superior Donuts, Lucifer, Scorpion, Kevin Can Wait, Dancing with the Stars, and The Voice.

The episode was the 64th most watched for the week in terms of viewership. With Live+7 DVR viewing factored in, the episode had a rating of 1.6 in the 18–49 demographic.

=== Critical reviews ===
Professional ratings
Review scores
Source	Rating
Rotten Tomatoes (Tomatometer)	100%
Rotten Tomatoes (Average Score)	7.0
IGN	7.0
TV Fanatic	4.5/5.0 stars
TV Overmind	4.0/5.0 stars

"Heroes Rise: These Delicate and Dark Obsessions" received generally positive reviews from critics. The episode received a rating of 100% with an average score of 7.0 out of 10 on the review aggregator Rotten Tomatoes.

Matt Fowler of IGN gave the episode a "good" 7.0 out of 10 and wrote in his verdict, "Penguin's silly sideshow with Ivy was the highlight here as Gotham gears up for Ra's al Ghul and the latest attempt to ruin and reset the city under the pretense that it will somehow ease, maybe erase, all the crime and corruption. Which it never does."

Nick Hogan of TV Overmind gave the episode a 4 star rating out of 5, writing "As we get to the end of the season, we have to wonder about whether there will be a 4th season of Gotham. I don’t think that their story is over, and it only gets better as it goes along. Wacky, insane Gotham is the best Gotham." Amanda Bell of EW gave the episode a "B" and wrote, "Last week, we were officially introduced to the Riddler, a.k.a. the new Ed Nygma, endless font of wacky wordplay. But this week, Gotham's newest supervillain is completely MIA while the rest of the puzzle pieces come into play."

Vinnie Mancuso of New York Observer wrote, "The lesson, in the end, which is important to keep in mind while Gotham keeps Bruce trapped in a faraway cell, is that the bats always came back, baby." Lisa Babick of TV Fanatic gave the series a 4.5 star rating out of 5, writing "Ben McKenzie made his directorial debut on Gotham Season 3 Episode 16 with a fun hour that featured a Penguin and Ivy alliance and on its flip side, a serious Bruce getting closer to his ultimate destiny. And the Court of Owls made an appearance too which doesn't bode well for the future of Gotham City." Robert Yanis, Jr. of Screenrant wrote, "While 'These Delicate and Dark Obsessions' very much feels like a transitional episode building into the tail end of the season, it does move some significant pieces into position for that final arc, leaving both Gordon (Ben McKenzie) and Bruce (David Mazouz) — the two characters whose parallel journeys the show has hinged on since day one — with some major decisions to make. The former even hops behind the camera for this round, as McKenzie makes his television directorial debut this week."

Kayti Burt of Den of Geek wrote, "The bright light in tonight's mediocre episode was the direction, undertaken by Gotham's very own Ben McKenzie. When actors step behind the camera, it's not always a great fit. McKenzie proved himself more than up for the challenge. In a show that is consistently beautiful and an episode that had some tough visual moments, McKenzie offered some standout visuals. He imbued the graveyard scenes with an ethereal beauty and made Bruce's frantic dashes through the labyrinth of the temple just as headspinning for the viewer. I'm not the biggest Jim Gordon fan, but that has never been Ben McKenzie's fault. And this episode proved that he is a man of many talents." MaryAnn Sleasman of TV Guide wrote, "Children -- and insecure man-child presidents -- get really bent about loyalty. Ivy's earnestness to prove her worth to Penguin and make him understand what real friends and allies look like is a very child-like approach to the usual Gotham City revenge plot and it kinda works. At the very least I don't hate it, and on Gotham, sometimes that's the best we can hope for."
