= Follow the White Rabbit =

- Gotham episode
- Episode no.: Season 3 Episode 6
- Directed by: Nathan Hope
- Written by: Steven Lilien; Bryan Wynbrandt
- Cinematography by: Christopher Norr
- Editing by: Sarah C. Reeves
- Production code: T13.19906
- Original air date: October 24, 2016
- Running time: 41 minutes

Guest appearances
- James Carpinello as Mario Calvi; Chelsea Spack as Isabella; Happy Anderson as Deever Tweed; Kieran Mulcare as White Rabbit; Jamie Chung as Valerie Vale

Episode chronology
← Previous "Anything for You"	Next → "Red Queen"
- Gotham season 3

"Follow the White Rabbit" (also known as "Mad City: Follow the White Rabbit") is the sixth episode of the third season, and 50th episode overall from the Fox series Gotham. The episode was written by co-executive producers Steven Lilien and Bryan Wynbrandt and directed by Nathan Hope. It was first broadcast on October 24, 2016. In the episode, Jervis Tetch begins to formulate a plan to lure out Gordon to him by the use of many people involved. Gordon is beginning to be aided by a white-suited man, the White Rabbit, in order to find Tetch, who's waiting for him to arrive and exact his revenge for Alice's death. Meanwhile, Cobblepot is ready to confess his love for Nygma, when Nygma finds someone close to him.

The episode received mostly positive reviews, with critics praising the episode for its writing and dark tone. Comic Book Resources named the episode as the 6th best episode in 2016 among comic book-related television series.

== Plot ==
In Gotham Cathedral, a couple gets married and leave on their limousine. The driver is revealed to be Tetch (Benedict Samuel), who states that he will not hurt them as that decision will be based on Gordon (Ben McKenzie) and it is also revealed that he has a child in the passenger seat.

In Dahl Manor, Cobblepot (Robin Lord Taylor) tells his servant (who does not speak English) that he plans on revealing his true feelings for Nygma (Cory Michael Smith). Gordon and Valerie (Jamie Chung) are having breakfast in a diner when Valerie tells him that she wants to talk to Lee (Morena Baccarin) about Alice Tetch's blood. Despite knowing that it would be uncomfortable, he agrees to help her. She leaves and then, a white-suited man (Kieran Mulcare) appears to Gordon, telling him a message from Tetch, "Follow my friend where to go, to learn the truth you've hidden below. Should you choose not to play, precious people will die today."

Gordon goes with the white-suited man to a street where a phone rings. Gordon answers it to find Tetch at the other end, taunting him over the phone, revealing that he has hypnotized the married couple and are going to fall to their deaths, in the overpass in front of Gordon. Tetch states that he can run upstairs to save the couple but below the bridge there is a child who is going to be hit by a hypnotized driver, wanting to reveal to Gordon that he cannot save both. After deciding, he chooses to save the boy and the couple fall from the bridge, killing themselves. Gordon then receives another call by Tetch, telling him to meet him in five minutes on a new address.

Lee's and Mario's (James Carpinello) engagement is announced to the press and Mario states that Falcone is planning on throwing an engagement party for them. The GCPD is investigating the couple's death and upon seeing that Gordon saved the boy, Barnes (Michael Chiklis) tells Bullock (Donal Logue) to put an all-points bulletin on Gordon. They find the white-suited man in the street and as he continues repeating the same words, they deduce that Tetch hypnotized him. Gordon arrives at the address and finds many photos and articles related to him and a telescope. A phone rings, revealing Tetch to be at the sight of the telescope. Gordon begins to taunt him by hanging up the phone many times, telling him that Alice is dead because of him and that he has to die to get revenge. After this, Tetch reveals that he has kidnapped Valerie.

Gordon confronts Barbara (Erin Richards) in the Sirens, as she was the only person who knew about him, revealing that Tetch came earlier and told him everything. Gordon receives another call from Tetch, who now has kidnapped Lee and tells him to go to a water plant. In the plant, Gordon finds two people, an anchorman and a pediatrician tied to chairs with helmets on their heads that will send an electric shock that one will die. The GCPD arrives to help but Tetch turns the helmets on, killing them both while telling Gordon that an old friend will tell him what to do next.

Valerie and Lee are chained in a bathroom and while speaking to each other, Valerie tries to get the information to the story but Lee is not interested. In the GCPD, Gordon notices the white-suited man arrested, realizing he is the "old friend" Tetch was referring to. The man writes, "The true test will be revealed. A final decision you must yield. Our tea party begins once more, when you walk through Lee Thompkins' door." Gordon is then confronted by Mario, who believes that he could know about her. Gordon enters Lee's apartment to find Lee and Valerie on chairs in the dining room, preparing for a tea party while Tetch and the Tweed Brothers hold them at gunpoint.

Tetch forces Gordon to sit for the "tea party", relating Alice's story to everyone in the table. He then takes out a gun and tells Gordon which one of them loves the most so he can kill her to get revenge for Alice's death. While this is happening, Mario enters the house by the basement and grabs a gun. Gordon begins to distract Tetch enough time for Mario to enter the room and hold Tetch at gunpoint; however, Tetch already found the gun and took out the bullets and has Mario chained in the bathroom while the tea party continues. Gordon begins to deviate his version of Alice's story as she states that she preferred to die rather than spending her life with him as she hated him. This causes Tetch's rage, to which he tells Gordon to tell him who to kill.

At the last moment, Gordon tells him to kill Lee but as Tetch believes Valerie is his love, he shoots her instead and leaves. Gordon and Lee rush Valerie to the hospital, with Mario doing the surgery. Cobblepot is preparing a dinner for Nygma, planning on finally confessing his love for him. Nygma is buying wine when he runs into a woman named Isabella (Chelsea Spack), who resembles Kristen Kringle, and they begin to bond with their fascination for riddles. In the hospital, Gordon wants to talk to Lee about what happened, but she tells him that it's not time.

== Production ==
=== Development ===
In July 2016, it was announced that the sixth episode of the season will be titled "Follow the White Rabbit" and was to be written by new co-executive producers and Alcatraz co-creators Steven Lilien & Bryan Wynbrandt and directed by Nathan Hope.

=== Writing ===
The episode receive attention upon the revelation that Oswald Cobblepot's character turned out to be gay. Actor Robin Lord Taylor talked about the move, "Part of it is just that residual fear of homophobia that I've experienced my entire life. And granted, I don't think Oswald is gay, per se. But the fact that he's having romantic feelings for another man, however anyone wants to label that, it still feels a little bit like coming out again. Only on a much, much, much bigger scale."

=== Casting ===
David Mazouz, Sean Pertwee, Camren Bicondova, Chris Chalk, Drew Powell and Maggie Geha don't appear in the episode as their respective characters. In October 2016, it was announced that the guest cast for the episode would include James Carpinello as Mario Calvi, Jamie Chung as Valerie Vale, Chelsea Spack as Isabella and Kieran Mulcare as White Rabbit. Set photos were revealed on August confirming Mulcare's involvement but his role on the series was not specified.

== Reception ==
=== Viewers ===
The episode was watched by 3.48 million viewers with a 1.1/4 share among adults aged 18 to 49. This was a 4% increase in viewership from the previous episode, which was watched by 3.32 million viewers with a 1.2/4 in the 18-49 demographics. With this rating, Gotham ranked second for FOX, behind Lucifer but beating Lucifer in 18-49 demographics, fourth on its timeslot and ninth for the night behind The Odd Couple, Scorpion, Timeless, 2 Broke Girls, Man with a Plan, Dancing with the Stars, Kevin Can Wait, and The Voice.

The episode ranked as the 67th most watched show on the week. With Live+7 DVR viewing factored in, the episode had an overall rating of 1.8 in the 18–49 demographic.

=== Critical reviews ===
Professional ratings
Review scores
Source	Rating
Rotten Tomatoes (Tomatometer)	100%
Rotten Tomatoes (Average Score)	8.2
IGN	7.9
TV Fanatic	4.5/5.0 stars
TV Overmind	5.0/5.0 stars

"Mad City: Follow the White Rabbit" received mostly positive reviews from critics. The episode received a rating of 100% with an average score of 8.2 out of 10 on the review aggregator Rotten Tomatoes.

Matt Fowler of IGN gave the episode a "good" 7.9 out of 10 and wrote in his verdict, "Gotham went dark this week by adding even more coal to Jim Gordon's already-formidable furnace of excruciating trauma. Mad Hatter sought to drive Jim mad and my *hat* goes off to the series for not rescuing Gordon at the last minute, forcing him to make that final choice between his two loves. And speaking of love, I also applaud the show for making the Penguin/Riddler relationship be much more than a tease. Even if it is just one-sided right now."

Nick Hogan of TV Overmind gave the series a perfect star rating of 5 out of 5, writing "The best part of this episode was the pulse-pounding nature of it. Every second was urgent. I loved that it wasn't wrapped up in a nice little bow. It was dark and gritty, and you could really tell that the Mad Hatter was working hard to devastate Jim, and that it was working. I hate when shows set up a scenario like this, only to weasel out of it somehow. But first he saved the kid and lost the married couple, and I knew from that moment on that this was going to be a dark one. Despite trying to get out unscathed with Mario's help, Valerie gets shot. Now, I'm pretty certain that Jim new what was going to happen, and he was taking his chances with Valerie receiving good care from the two doctors in the building. But it sets up a really poignant story going forward, as I doubt Valerie will see it that way."

Sage Young of EW gave the episode a "B−" and stated: "Last week, Benedict Samuel's deranged Mad Hatter only showed up in one bloody tableau. In 'Follow the White Rabbit,' every other story save one takes the episode off so that Jervis Tetch can get his revenge on James Gordon. Shocker: Playing dress-up with a doomed young women hasn't turned out to be the healthiest method of grieving his sister. Plan B involves constructing an elaborate scavenger hunt for his nemesis so that Gordon will feel the same pain that Jervis does. It gets him out of the house, I suppose."

Lisa Babick from TV Fanatic, gave a 4.5 star rating out of 5, stating: "Maybe Jim is going to be the one to push Barnes towards his true destiny. All I know is I can't wait for Barnes to cross over to the dark side. That burly bastard needs something else to do than push around Gotham's finest. So, hurry up with it already, Gotham. Please." Vinnie Mancuso of New York Observer wrote, "Elsewhere, Gotham's moving parts didn't do much to warrant more than a passing mention, as entertaining as they all are. I mean, it's huge for both character and canon that Oswald Cobblepot articulated, out loud, the words 'I love you,' but it will have more weight when the chair across from him isn't empty. Meanwhile, Erin Richards has been pulling off the Herculean feat of stealing every scene she's in as bananas-as-hell Barbara Kean, while at the same time being given so little of substance to do by Gotham‘s writers. I'm not entirely convinced Richards isn't just showing up to set with a bottle of wine and commenting on the scenes happening around her without a script."

Megan Vick of TV.com wrote, "Gotham's Jim Gordon hasn't been given that stripped-down treatment until now and if Tetch's antics are just the beginning of a season-long focus on the minutiae of Gordon, then I am so excited for the rest of this season."

Kayti Burt of Den of Geek gave a perfect 5 star rating out of 5 and wrote, "To be fair, so far, Barnes' angry outbursts don't actually seem that out of character. He's always been kind of a yell-y guy. But that doesn't mean he won't soon go into a rage-spiral and take a bite out of someone, a la the rats Lee and co. have been testing Alice's blood on. Barnes' descent into madness might not be the most interesting thing that's going on on Gotham right now, but the show's slow, steady unfurling of this plotline is indicative of a larger patience Gotham is demonstrating with its plots this season. Could season three actually be the season Gotham finally gets it right? Call me a TV optimist, but I'm willing to risk hoping."
