= Anything for You =

Anything for You may refer to:

- "Anything for You" (Gotham), a television episode
- "Anything for You" (Bonnie Pink song), 2007
- "Anything for You" (Gloria Estefan and Miami Sound Machine song), 1988
  - a reissue of the same name of the band's album Let It Loose released in Europe, Australasia and South Africa
- "Anything for You" (Snow song), 1995
- "(I Would Do) Anything for You", a jazz standard written by Alex Hill, Claude Hopkins, and Bob Williams, 1932
- "Anything for You", a song written by George and Ira Gershwin for the stage musical A Dangerous Maid, 1921
- "Anything for You", a song by Jake Owen from Easy Does It, 2009
- "Anything for You", a song by Lee Harding from What's Wrong with This Picture?, 2006
- "Anything for You", a song by Mr. Big from Mr. Big, 1989
