= Teacher's Pet (2025 film) =

- Release poster
- Directed by: Noam Kroll
- Written by: Noam Kroll
- Produced by: Sheldon Brigman; Richard Handley; Noam Kroll
- Starring: Luke Barnett; Michelle Torian; Barbara Crampton; Sara Tomko; Drew Powell
- Cinematography: Noam Kroll
- Edited by: Noam Kroll
- Music by: Craig Saltz
- Production company: Launch Releasing
- Distributed by: Launch Releasing; AMP International; Quiver Distribution
- Release dates: June 21, 2025 (Dances with Films); February 6, 2026 (VOD)
- Running time: 90 minutes
- Country: United States
- Language: English

Teacher's Pet is a 2025 American thriller film written and directed by Noam Kroll. The film stars Luke Barnett and Michelle Torian. It is produced, financed and distributed by Launch Releasing.

The film follows a malevolent new high school teacher with a hidden past who becomes disturbingly fixated on a gifted female student. As his behavior escalates and his sociopathic nature emerges, the student is forced into a dangerous psychological battle to survive.

== Plot ==
Clara Simmons, an intelligent high school senior who lives in a foster home with her mother, another girl and an abusive foster father, is offered a conditional scholarship to Yale and has been receiving assistance from her English teacher to prepare for university.

As she starts her school day, the class is informed that their teacher has unexpectedly died by suicide. The replacement teacher, Mr. Heller, starts the same day: charismatic, well-spoken, and appears genuinely interested in helping students. He notices Clara's intelligence and offers to assist her in continuing to prepare for her Yale scholarship, to which she accepts.

Initially, Heller seems like the ideal mentor. He encourages Clara's writing, gives her extra attention, and treats her as someone intellectually equal to himself. However, his behavior gradually becomes unsettling. His interest in Clara becomes increasingly personal rather than academic, and he begins subtly manipulating her, isolating her from other students and adults, and driving her hard on her writing assignments.

Clara and her only friend, Zach, walk through parkland and discover the dead body of a girl, reporting it to the police.

After class the next day, Heller forces Clara to stay overnight at school to rewrite her assignment a number of times after not meeting his extreme expectations, including detailing her friendship with Zach, and the school counsellor finds her walking home before school starts, finding out about Heller’s treatment of her, ordering her to go home and rest and saying she will report him.

Later that day, Heller comes to her house under the pretence of concern over her wellbeing and threatens her when her mother goes to make him a drink. He leaves soon after.

We see Heller at home speaking with his mother on the phone where he talks about his wife being unavailable and that his kids are making her a birthday card, but we see him drawing it.

Clara grows suspicious as strange events begin occurring around the school and in her personal life. Her foster father comes home with injuries after bruising on her body is noticed by Heller and the school counsellor disappears under mysterious circumstances.

Clara goes to a house party with her friend Zach where she uses recreational drugs with another girl from her class named Maddy.

Clara starts investigating Heller’s background and finds that he has worked at several schools over the years, and a disturbing pattern follows him. At each previous school, gifted female students disappeared or died under suspicious circumstances. Heller has repeatedly reinvented himself by moving from school to school, selecting brilliant young women, gaining their trust through mentorship, and murdering anyone who threatens to expose him.

Clara’s abusive foster father tears up her writing work over an argument that she won’t sign a welfare declaration to lie for him to continue receiving welfare payments and she comes home to find him having seemingly killed himself.

Once Heller realizes Clara is investigating him, the relationship changes completely. Heller rejects Clara and has offered his support to classmate Maddy, who becomes his new star student.

As Clara threatens to expose him, he shows her secret video footage of her using drugs with Zach and Maddy at the party. They trick Maddy into meeting them so they can confront her about the video and she reveals that Heller made her secretly record them at the party.

As Clara and Zach break into Heller’s home, they discover evidence tying him to the murder of the girl they found in the parkland as well as other events. Heller comes home with an unconscious Maddy and discovers Clara and Zach in his house. He catches them, ties them up and they awaken to find him killing Maddy in front of them.

Heller then kills Zach and is about to kill Clara when she promises she will write something for him that shows she truly understands who he is and why he does what he does. He thinks it over and allows her to do so and Clara writes for him. When she finishes, he reads it and is brought to tears. He allows her to go, but she suddenly returns with a baseball bat and kills him after repeated strikes.

The police clear her of her actions of self-defence and she is free to return to school. When class starts, a new male teacher introduces himself and Clara has flashbacks of what happened with Heller, seeing his face for a moment in place of the new teacher.

== Cast ==
- Luke Barnett as Mr. Heller
- Michelle Torian as Clara
- Clayton Royal Johnson as Zach
- Kevin Makely as Jack
- Sara Tomko as Mrs Estrada
- Drew Powell as Detective Sommers
- Alexe-Anne Godin as Maddy
- Richard Handley as Principal Edwards
- Alexis DawTyne as Evie
- Barbara Crampton as Sylvia

== Production ==
In February 2023, Teacher's Pet was announced as part of Launch Releasing's development slate. At the time of the announcement, the film was attached to writer-director Noam Kroll.

In November 2023, it was announced that Luke Barnett would star in Teacher's Pet, marking his first collaboration with Kroll. Launch Releasing confirmed that the film would be financed, produced, and distributed by the company, with production scheduled to begin in Los Angeles in early 2024. It was developed and produced under a SAG-AFTRA interim agreement, which was secured shortly before the conclusion of the 2023 Hollywood actors' strike.

In February 2024, actress Barbara Crampton was announced as joining the cast. Additional casting announcements confirmed roles for Michelle Torian, Sara Tomko, Drew Powell, Kevin Makely, Clayton Royal Johnson, Alexe-Anne Godin, and Alexis DawTyne.

The film was produced by Launch Releasing's CEO Sheldon Brigman, Richard Handley and Kroll. Other producers included Kayli Fortun and Brian Hanson. Executive producers included Barnett, Brigman, Kelby Thwaits, Charles Bunce and Russ DeWolf.

== Release ==
Teacher's Pet screened at the Dances With Films Festival, where it had its world premiere on June 21, 2025.

In November 2025, Teacher's Pet was announced as being available for sale at the American Film Market. Quiver Distribution acquired North American distribution rights, while AMP International launched international sales for the film.

In January, 2026, Teacher's Pet was released on digital and video-on-demand platforms on February 6, 2026.
