= Scott White (director) =

American television director and producer

- Occupation(s): Television director and producer
- Years active: 1967–present

Scott White is an American television director and producer. He is perhaps best known for his work on the series Without a Trace, working under different capacities as a director, producer and unit production manager throughout the show's run (2002–2009).

His other directing credits include Dream On, CSI: NY and Ringer.

His producing television credits include Freddy's Nightmares, Fudge (also director), Burn Notice, as well producing a number of television films.

White has also had experience working as an assistant director and unit production manager on many feature films, television films and television series. As well as having bit acting roles sporadically from 1967 to 2002.
