= Maggie Geha =

American actress and model

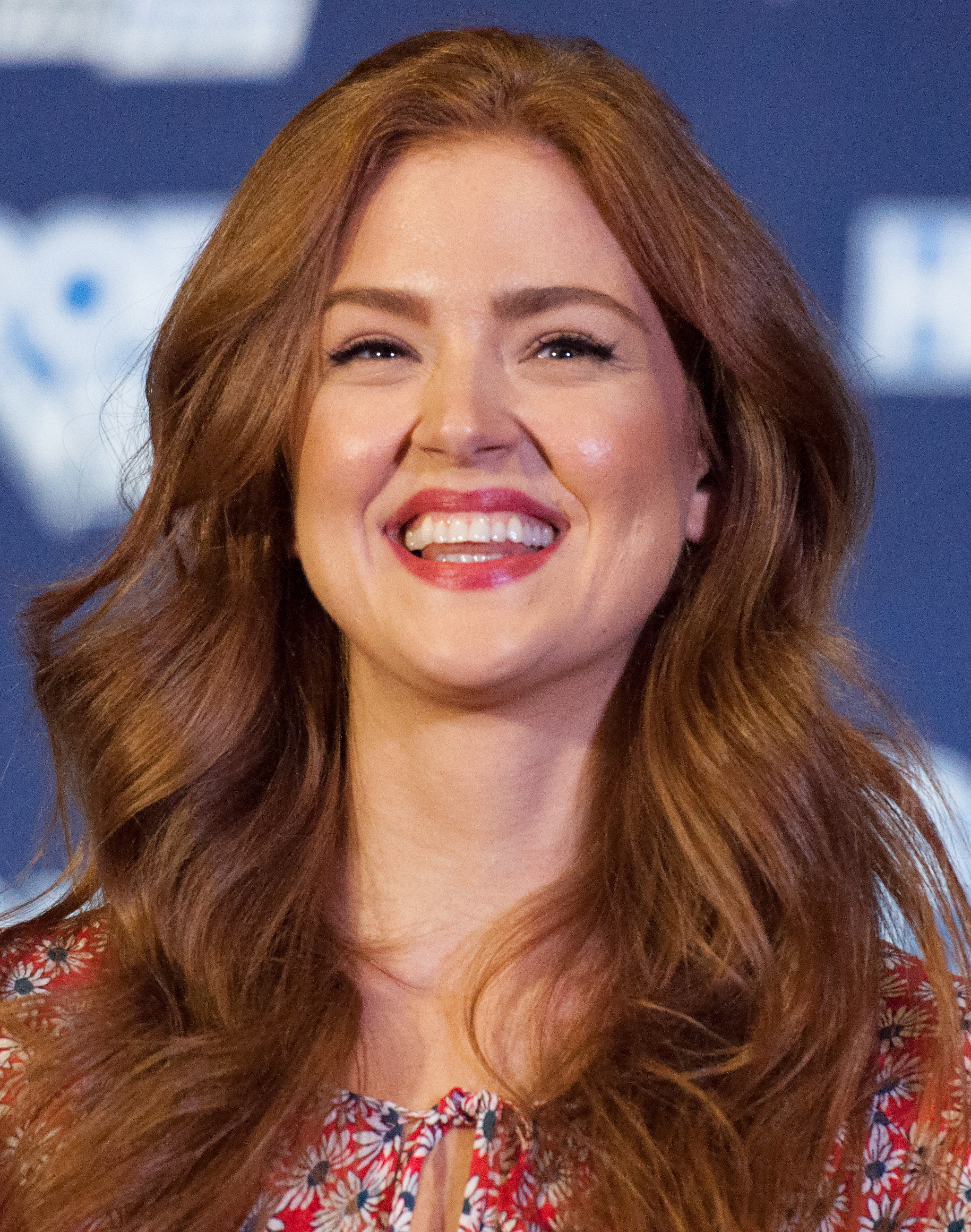
- Geha in 2017
- Born: April 4, 1988 (age 38); Boston, Massachusetts, U.S.
- Education: Marymount Manhattan College
- Occupations: Actress; model
- Years active: 2007–present

Maggie Geha (born April 4, 1988) is an American actress and model. She is known for playing the adult Ivy "Pamela" Pepper in 23 episodes of the Fox TV series Gotham and as Susan in six episodes of All My Children.

== Life and career ==
Maggie Geha was born and raised in Boston, Massachusetts, in 1988. She attended high school in Vermont and then college in Newport, Rhode Island. Geha has lived in New York City and has studied theater with a focus on performance at Marymount Manhattan College. In June 2016, it was announced that she would assume the role of the adult Poison Ivy in the U.S. television series Gotham. After just one year, she left the series and was replaced by Peyton List. Beside her work as an actress, she is working as a model and was Miss Vermont Teen USA in 2004. She is also known for her roles in Ted 2 and Winter's Tale. In August 2018, it was announced that Geha would have the regular role of Abigail "Abby" Spencer on the Netflix situation comedy series Mr. Iglesias.

== Filmography ==
Film performances
Year	Title	Role	Notes
2014	Winter's Tale	Girl in Bed	
2014	The Rewrite	Flo Bai	
2015	Ted 2	Female Nurse	
2015	In Stereo	Paula	
2016	The Harrow	Gale	
2023	Shoulder Dance	Lilly	
2024	Sheepdog	Crystal Sparks	

Television performances
Year	Title	Role	Notes
2012	Gossip Girl	Hot Girl in Bar	Episode: "Dirty Rotten Scandals"
2013	30 Rock	Inga	Episode: "Hogcock!/Last Lunch"
2013	All My Children	Susan	6 episodes
2015	Happyish	Receptionist	Unaired pilot
2016–2017	Gotham	Ivy "Pamela" Pepper	Main role (season 3); guest role (season 4)
2019–2020	Mr. Iglesias	Abby Spencer	Main role
