= Benedict Samuel =

Actor, writer, and director

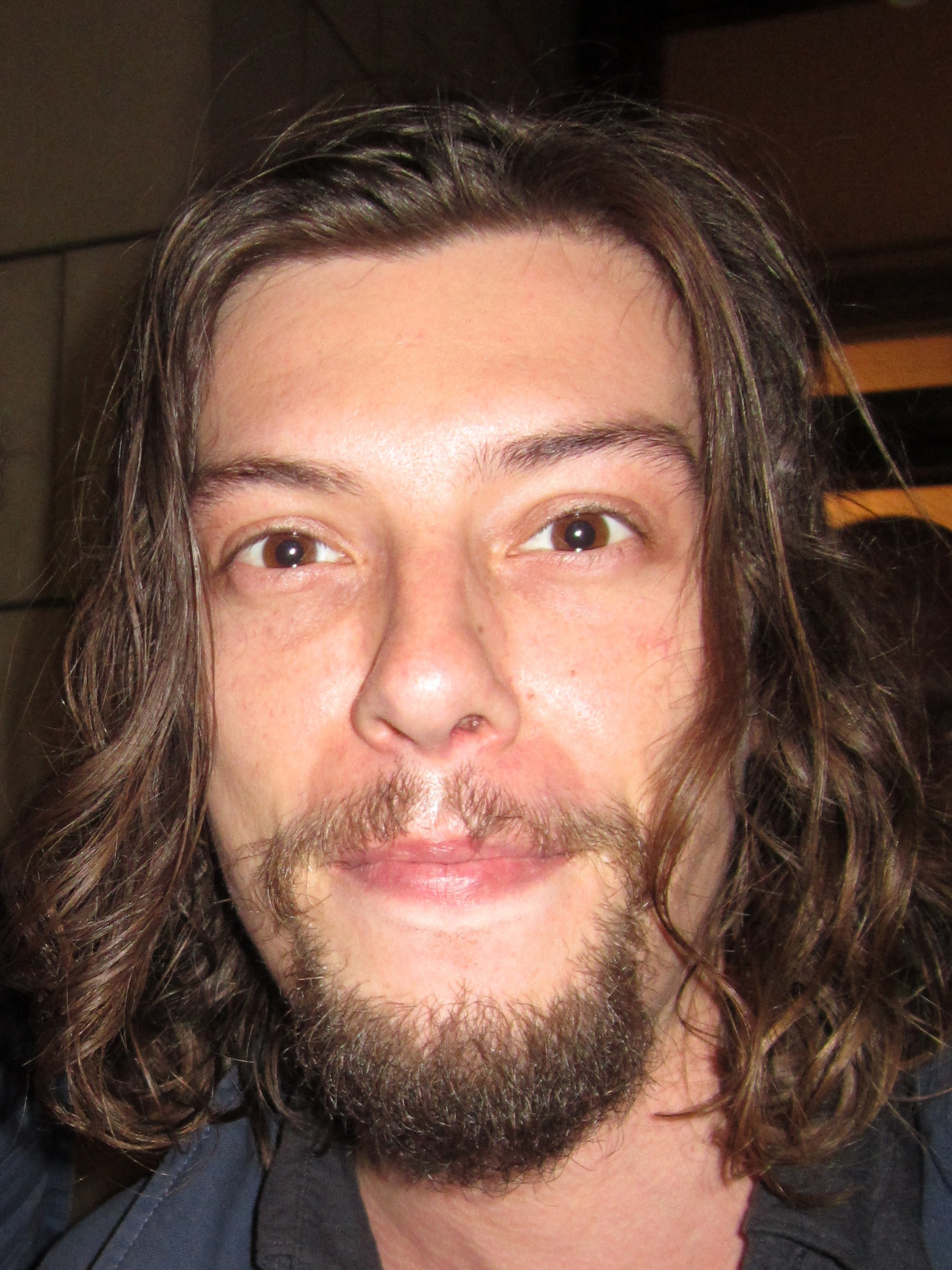
- Samuel in 2016
- Born: 15 April 1988 (age 38); Adelaide, Australia
- Occupations: Actor, writer, director
- Years active: 2011–present
- Relatives: Xavier Samuel (brother)

Benedict Victor Samuel (born 15 April 1988) is an Australian actor, writer, and director best known for playing Jervis Tetch / Mad Hatter in the Fox crime series Gotham and Owen in The Walking Dead.

== Early life and education ==
Benedict Samuel was born in Adelaide, South Australia. The youngest of three siblings, his brother is actor Xavier Samuel and his sister is a stage manager. He planned to be an actor from an early age and was inspired by his brother's high school theatre performances.

Benedict attended Christian Brothers College in Adelaide, and is a graduate of The National Institute of Dramatic Art (NIDA).

== Career ==
In theatre, Samuel performed in Sex Wars during his time at NIDA. He also played a part in 'Tis Pity She's a Whore at the Malthouse Theatre in Melbourne.

In 2011, Benedict appeared on several Australian television series, including the mini-series Paper Giants: The Birth of Cleo and the children's series My Place. He is known for playing the role of Harman "Hammer" Pirovic on Seven Network soap opera Home and Away, for which he appeared for several episodes until his character was killed off.

Samuel made his directorial debut with the short film Sanctuary in 2012.

In 2014, Samuel was cast in Asthma, the directorial debut from Jake Hoffman, alongside Iggy Pop, Rene Ricard, and Krysten Ritter.

In 2015, Samuel played Skeet du Pont in the acclaimed ABC series The Beautiful Lie, and Jacob Harding in the thriller film The Stanford Prison Experiment.

In his most recognisable performances, Samuel appeared as Owen, the leader of the Wolves gang, in the American post-apocalyptic zombie series The Walking Dead.

In 2016, Samuel was cast as famous Batman villain The Mad Hatter, the main antagonist of the third season of Gotham. He continued to play the character in a recurring capacity during the fourth season, beginning to appear again with the episode "Ace Chemicals" of Season 5.

Secret City is an Australian political thriller television series based on the best-selling novels The Marmalade Files, The Mandarin Code, and The Shadow Game by Chris Uhlmann and Steve Lewis. The show filmed in 2016 and Samuel plays Felix .

In 2018, Samuel played Lewis, the main villain in the Australian movie Pimped.

== Filmography ==
=== Film ===
Year	Title	Role	Notes
2012	Underground: The Julian Assange Story	Jonah	
2014	Asthma	Gus	
2015	The Stanford Prison Experiment	Jacob Harding	
2015	The Walk	David	
2016	The Duel	Brit	
2017	Ellipsis	Jasper	
2018	Pimped	Lewis Henry Robinson	
2019	Sweetheart	Brad	
2021	Warning	Vincent	
2022	Leave Not One Alive	Ronin	
2022	North of Normal	Karl	
TBA	Lovers †	Paris	Post-production

=== Short film ===
Year	Title	Role	Notes
2011	Kiss	Sean	
2012	The Shed	Creature	
2012	The Alien Boy	Rioter	
2012	Sanctuary	None	Director and writer
2014	The Little House	Zach	
2015	Oscar Wilde's the Nightingale and the Rose	Student (voice)	
2022	Dark Blue	Man in Trunk	

=== Television ===
Year	Title	Role	Notes
2011	Paper Giants: The Birth of Cleo	Michael	Miniseries (1 episode)
2011	Home and Away	Harman "Hammer" Pirovic	Season 24 (recurring, 8 episodes)
2015	The Beautiful Lie	Skeet Du Pont	Season 1 (main role, 6 episodes)
2015	Childhood's End	Fence	Miniseries (1 episode)
2015–2016	The Walking Dead	Owen	Seasons 5–6 (recurring, 5 episodes)
2016	Secret City	Felix Crawford	Season 1 (main role, 6 episodes)
2016–2019	Gotham	Jervis Tetch / Mad Hatter	Season 3 (main role, 10 episodes)
2016–2019	Gotham	Jervis Tetch / Mad Hatter	Seasons 4–5 (recurring, 4 episodes)
2019	Chicago PD	Matthew Garrett / Outrage	Season 6 (guest, 1 episode)
2020	Into The Dark	Royal Briggins	Season 2 (guest, 1 episode)
2022	FBI: Most Wanted	Teddy	Season 4 (guest, 1 episode)
2025	Black Snow	Sean	Season 2
