= Drew Powell (actor) =

American actor (born 1976)

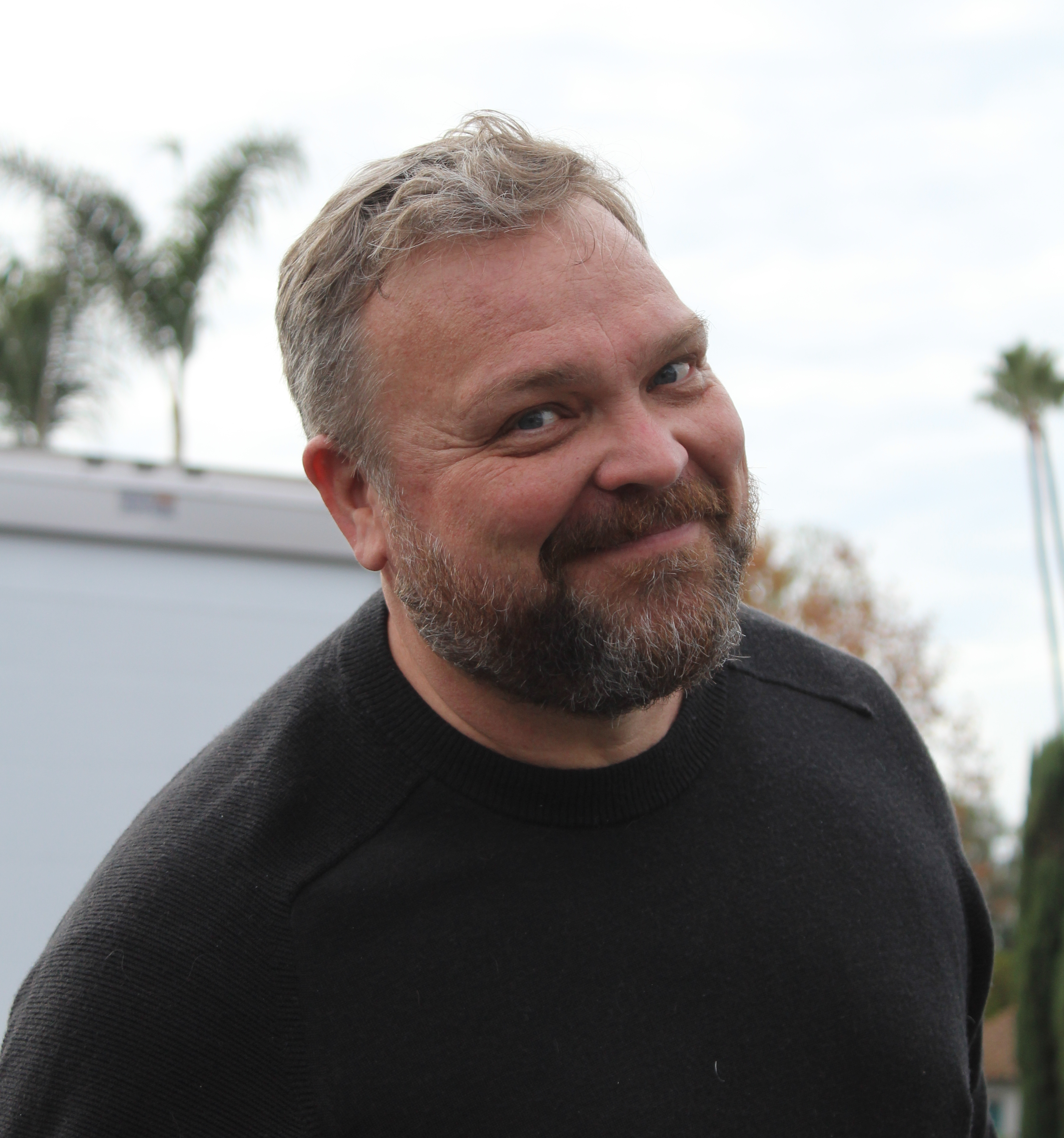
- Powell in 2024
- Born: January 19, 1976 (age 50); Noblesville, Indiana
- Occupation: Actor
- Years active: 2000–present
- Spouse: Veronica Powell
- Children: 1

Andrew "Drew" Powell (born January 19, 1976) is an American actor. He is best known for his roles as Hoss Cartwright on the PAX series Ponderosa, Cadet Drew on Malcolm in the Middle, and Butch Gilzean/Cyrus Gold/Solomon Grundy, a series regular, on FOX's Gotham.

== Early life and education ==
Powell was born in Noblesville, Indiana and grew up in Lebanon, Indiana, graduating from Lebanon Senior High School. He graduated from DePauw University in 1998 and moved to Los Angeles where he soon began auditioning for acting roles.

== Career ==
His first television role was as a cadet on Fox's Malcolm in the Middle. He appeared in thirteen episodes. Soon after, he portrayed Hoss Cartwright on the series Ponderosa, a prequel to Bonanza which premiered in 2001 on PAX. Powell has had guest appearances on many television shows including Psych, House, Leverage, ER, Cold Case, and Without a Trace. On Fox's Gotham he plays the recurring role of Butch Gilzean, chief enforcer for Fish Mooney (Jada Pinkett Smith).

He portrayed Bic in the 2011 film Straw Dogs, a remake of the 1971 film of the same name. The remake was directed by Rod Lurie and starred James Marsden, Kate Bosworth, and Alexander Skarsgård. It was released September 16, 2011.

== Personal life ==
While shooting The Ponderosa in Australia, Powell met his wife, Veronica, who was a make-up artist on the show. They have one son, born in 2011. They live in Los Angeles.

== Filmography ==
=== Film ===
| Year | Title | Role | Notes |
|---|---|---|---|
| 2004 | Starship Troopers 2: Hero of the Federation | Pvt. Kipper Tor | Video |
| 2006 | The Window | Detective | Short |
| 2006 | The Marine | Joe | |
| 2007 | Mexican Sunrise | Tindol | |
| 2007 | 1408 | Assistant Hotel Manager | |
| 2009 | The System | Jimmy | Short |
| 2009 | The Five Stages of Grief of a TV Guest Star | Himself | Short |
| 2010 | Camp Hell | Bob | |
| 2011 | Straw Dogs | Bic | |
| 2011 | Touchback | Dwight Pearson | |
| 2012 | Guitar Face | Paul Werner | Short |
| 2012 | Safe Room | Leo | Short |
| 2012 | Impulsive | Joey | Short |
| 2013 | Ivanov Red, White, and Blue | Agent X | Short |
| 2015 | Reparation | CMS Fishman | |
| 2015 | Sex, Death and Bowling | Tim Hollister | |
| 2015 | Skeletons | Eric Hess | Short |
| 2016 | Parachute Girls | Ash | Short |
| 2016 | Message from the King | Merrick | |
| 2017 | Inheritance | Del Morse | |
| 2017 | Geostorm | Chris Campbell | |
| 2017 | Hutterite | Minister | Short |
| 2018 | Wanderland | Donny Softlicker | |
| 2021 | Far More | Tim Hollister | |
| 2021 | Ted K | Tom | |
| 2021 | Champ | Danny | Short |
| 2022 | Six | John | Short |
| 2022 | A Christmas Mystery | George Bottoms | |
| 2023 | Soda | Totally Manly Man | Short |
| 2024 | Ordinary Angels | Pastor Dave | |
| 2024 | Space Cadet | Lucas | |
| 2025 | Teacher's Pet | Detective Sommers | |
| 2025 | The Unbreakable Boy | Joe | |
| 2026 | Crime 101 | Detective Townsend | |

=== Television ===
| Year | Title | Role | Notes |
|---|---|---|---|
| 2000–01 | Malcolm in the Middle | Cadet Drew | Recurring cast (season 1–2) |
| 2001 | Popular | Bouncer | Episode: "It's Greek To Me" |
| 2001 | V.I.P. | Jock | Episode: "21 Val Street" |
| 2001–02 | Ponderosa | Eric "Hoss" Cartwright | Main cast |
| 2004 | CSI: Crime Scene Investigation | Holding Cell Cop | Episode: "Bloodlines" |
| 2005 | Over There | Marine Recruiter | Episode: "Situation Normal" |
| 2006 | Monk | Eddie Murdoch | Episode: "Mr. Monk Can't See a Thing" |
| 2007 | Cold Case | Casey Evans | Episode: "Stand Up and Holler" |
| 2007 | The Office | The Bartender | Episode: "Local Ad" |
| 2007 | Without a Trace | Security Guard | Episode: "Run" |
| 2008 | ER | Dennis Voltaire | Episode: "Truth Will Out" |
| 2008 | House | Anthony | Episode: "Adverse Events" |
| 2009 | Psych | Football Player | Episode: "Any Given Friday Night at 10PM, 9PM Central" |
| 2009 | In Plain Sight | Sandor Kane/Sandy | Episode: "A Stand-Up Triple" |
| 2009–11 | Leverage | Jack Hurley | Guest cast (season 1 & 4) |
| 2011 | Memphis Beat | Clay Williams | Episode: "At the River" |
| 2011 | Ringer | Detective Singer | Episode: "It's Gonna Kill Me, But I'll Do It" |
| 2011 | American Horror Story | Detective Collier | Episode: "Home Invasion" |
| 2011 | Grey's Anatomy | Carl Shatler | Episode: "Put Me In, Coach" |
| 2011 | Unforgettable | Kevin McMillan | Episode: "Lost Things" |
| 2011 | The Pee-wee Herman Show | Bear/Mr. Window (voice) | TV movie |
| 2012 | Southland | Officer Merkel | Recurring cast (season 4) |
| 2012 | Raising Hope | Warden | Recurring cast (season 2) |
| 2012 | Awake | George O'Dell | Episode: "Game Day" |
| 2012 | Necessary Roughness | Ryan 'Rhino' Norton | Episode: "What's Eating You?" |
| 2012 | True Blood | Ryder | Episode: "Somebody That I Used To Know" |
| 2012 | Bones | Paulo Romano | Episode: "The Partners In The Divorce" |
| 2012 | NCIS | Fred Hadly | Episode: "Gone" |
| 2012 | Modern Family | Terry | Episode: "When a Tree Falls" |
| 2012–13 | The Mentalist | Reede Smith | Recurring cast (season 5–6) |
| 2013 | Hawaii Five-0 | Coach Eric Blair/Larry Banks | Episode: "Na Ki'i (Dolls)" |
| 2013 | Major Crimes | Ron Browning | Episode: "Rules of Engagement" |
| 2013 | Twisted | Coach Harry Chandler | Recurring cast |
| 2013–20 | Ray Donovan | Gary O'Malley | Guest cast (season 1 & 7) |
| 2014 | Castle | Sam Carson | Episode: "Room 147" |
| 2014–18 | Gotham | Cyrus "Butch Gilzean" Gold | Recurring cast (season 1), main cast (season 2–4) |
| 2015 | Man Jam | Bud | Main cast |
| 2015 | Aquarius | Tolson | Episode: "A Change Is Gonna Come" |
| 2015 | The Exes | Jim | Episode: "Finding Mr. Wrong" |
| 2015 | The Librarians | Ray | Episode: "And the Hollow Men" |
| 2018 | Terror in the Woods | Nathan | TV movie |
| 2019 | 9-1-1 | David Cohen | Episode: "Broken" |
| 2019 | Chicago P.D. | Chris Boyd | Episode: "Reckoning" |
| 2019 | Looking for Alaska | Frank Young | Episode: "Now Comes the Mystery" |
| 2020 | AJ and the Queen | Carl | Episode: "Little Rock" |
| 2020 | Hightown | Anthony Delviccario | Recurring cast (season 1) |
| 2020 | Station 19 | Fowler | Episode: "Nothing Seems the Same" |
| 2021 | Coyote | Joe Don Walker | Recurring cast |
| 2021 | Lucifer | Coach Dale McVey | Episode: "Bloody Celestial Karaoke Jam" |
| 2021–25 | Leverage: Redemption | Jack Hurley | 2 episodes |
| 2022 | Young Sheldon | Roy | Recurring cast (season 5) |
| 2023 | The Rookie | Eric 'Knuckles' Mills | Episode: "Daddy Cop" |
| 2023 | Cooper's Bar | Griff | Recurring cast (season 2) |
| 2023 | You're Not Supposed to Be Here | Jim | TV movie |
| 2024 | Chicago Med | Harris Shorr | Episode: "Row Row Row Your Boat on a Rocky Sea" |
| 2024 | Curb Your Enthusiasm | Cyrus York | Recurring cast (season 12) |
| 2024 | Monsters: The Lyle and Erik Menendez Story | Det. Tom Linehan | 2 episodes |
| 2025 | The Pitt | Doug Driscoll | Recurring cast (season 1) |
| 2025 | Tracker | Joe Marsh | Episode: "Echo Ridge" |
| 2026 | Malcolm in the Middle: Life's Still Unfair | Drew | 1 episode |

=== Video games ===
| Year | Title | Role |
|---|---|---|
| 2012 | Hitman: Absolution | Wade Goon, Dexter Industries Guards, Hope Cops, Blackwater Penthouse Guards |
| 2013 | Grand Theft Auto V | Various |
| 2022 | Horizon Forbidden West | Izvad, Jomar, Additional Voices |
