= All Will Be Judged =

- Gotham episode
- Episode no.: Season 3 Episode 19
- Directed by: John Behring
- Written by: Ken Woodruff
- Cinematography by: Crescenzo Notarile
- Editing by: Leland Sexton
- Production code: T13.19918
- Original air date: May 22, 2017
- Running time: 43 minutes

Guest appearances
- Leslie Hendrix as Kathryn Monroe; James Carpinello as Mario Calvi; Raymond J. Barry as the Shaman

Episode chronology
← Previous "Light the Wick"	Next → "Pretty Hate Machine"
- Gotham season 3

"All Will Be Judged" is the nineteenth episode of the third season, and 63rd episode overall from the Fox series Gotham. The show is itself based on the characters created by DC Comics set in the Batman mythology. The episode was written by executive producer Ken Woodruff and directed by John Behring. It was first broadcast on May 22, 2017.

In the episode, Lee begins to have an identity crisis after finding more evidence about Mario's death and her possible role in everything that's been happening to her with a visit to Tetch in Arkham. Gordon and Bullock find the new clues that lead to the Court's bomb, using a map hidden within the crystal owls. However, their search is interrupted by Captain Barnes, who wants to kill Gordon for his previous actions. Bullock saves him and finds new evidence that will manage to arrest Kathryn for interrogation but Barnes is hell bent on meting out his perverted sense of justice. Meanwhile, Cobblepot and Nygma face each other in their cells while Bruce continues his training with the Shaman.

The episode received positive reviews although the slow progression received some criticism.

== Plot ==
Cobblepot (Robin Lord Taylor) and Nygma (Cory Michael Smith) confront each other in their cells, with Nygma believing Cobblepot to be just a ghost or a hallucination. Meanwhile, Selina (Camren Bicondova) attacks Five (David Mazouz) on Wayne Manor until Alfred (Sean Pertwee) separates them. After the revelation Five is not the real Bruce, Five knocks Alfred and Selina unconscious. The Shaman (Raymond J. Barry) and Bruce arrive at Gotham.

Lee (Morena Baccarin) has a dream where Mario (James Carpinello) puts his contaminated blood on her glass. In the GCPD, Gordon (Ben McKenzie) and Bullock (Donal Logue) find new evidence that Kathryn (Leslie Hendrix) possesses multiple properties around Gotham and the duo set off to find one of the properties to find the bomb. On the property, they find a crystal owl and using their lights, they discover a map of Gotham City. A grenade is thrown and Barnes (Michael Chiklis) arrives in a suit, taking Gordon with him. Alfred decides to go look for Bruce but as Selina refuses, he tells her to leave and never come back, comparing her to her mother.

The Shaman takes Bruce to another trip in which he tells him to lock away his mother's jewels in order to take away the pain. The Shaman then shows Bruce one of his memories where the Shaman discovered the Waynes' murderer and killed the person who ordered the hit. Gordon is taken to a property where he is confronted by Kathryn and then left with Barnes, who is treating Gordon on a trial acting as his "judge, jury and executioner". Just before his attempted killing by Barnes, he is rescued by the GCPD while Barnes escapes. Lee visits Tetch (Benedict Samuel) in Arkham and finds that he gave the virus to Mario so she could hate Gordon in order to destroy him and replies that the person to blame is Lee herself.

Cobblepot and Nygma put their differences aside in order to escape from their cells. They manage to escape and give each other an advantage of six hours before killing each other. Bullock has Kathryn arrested and taken to the GCPD. When Alfred discovers this, he enters the interrogation room and stabs Kathryn to force her into revealing Bruce's location. Barnes arrives, knocking everyone in the building out with a grenade. Kathryn tries to reason with Barnes, who responds by killing her. Gordon manages to get a shotgun and shoots at Barnes' axe-tipped glove, cutting his hand and then knocking him down. Bruce completes the transition, feeling nothing about his parents' death, and now under the Shaman's mental control. Bullock has the owl statue fixed and displays the map but is notified that Barnes has escaped on its transference. They also find that the vial of blood with the virus has been taken. Gordon finally discovers who took it. The episode ends as Lee injects herself with the virus, showing her eyes and face getting infected.

== Production ==
=== Development ===
In May 2017, it was announced that the nineteenth episode of the season will be titled "All Will Be Judged" and was to be written by Ken Woodruff and directed by John Behring.

=== Casting ===
Erin Richards, Jessica Lucas, Chris Chalk, Drew Powell, and Maggie Geha don't appear in the episode as their respective characters. In May 2017, it was announced that the guest cast for the episode would include James Carpinello as Mario Calvi, Leslie Hendrix as Kathryn, and Raymond J. Barry as the Shaman.

== Reception ==
=== Viewers ===
The episode was watched by 2.92 million viewers with a 1.0/4 share among adults aged 18 to 49, a new series low. This was a slight decrease in viewership from the previous episode, which was watched by 2.98 million viewers with a 0.9/3 in the 18-49 demographics. With this rating, Gotham ranked second for FOX, behind Lucifer but beating Lucifer in the 18-49 demographics, third on its timeslot and fourth for the night behind The Bachelorette, Dancing with the Stars, and The Voice.

With Live+7 DVR viewing factored in, the episode had an overall viewership of 4.58 million viewers and a rating of 1.6 in the 18–49 demographic.

=== Critical reviews ===
Professional ratings
Review scores
Source	Rating
Rotten Tomatoes (Tomatometer)	100%
Rotten Tomatoes (Average Score)	6.87
IGN	6.6
TV Fanatic	5.0/5.0 stars
TV Overmind	4.5/5.0 stars

"Heroes Rise: All Will Be Judged" received positive reviews from critics. The episode received a rating of 100% with an average score of 6.87 out of 10 on the review aggregator Rotten Tomatoes.

Matt Fowler of IGN gave the episode an "okay" 6.8 out of 10 and wrote in his verdict, "Despite a few moments of gory shock and awe, and a fun Riddler/Penguin truce, Gotham's just gotten in the habit of repeating itself - be it abductions, crazy villains out to kill Jim, assaults on the precinct, or plots to level the city."

Nick Hogan of TV Overmind gave the episode a 4.5 star rating out of 5, writing "All in all, I very much enjoyed this episode and I'm more excited than ever for the last few episodes. They're not pulling any punches and I can't wait to see where it leads."

Amanda Bell of EW gave the episode a "B+" and wrote, "There's a lot to unpack on this week's episode of Gotham. From launching grand vengeance schemes to casting aside old rivalries and pain, each of our heroes and villains is making moves that will definitely have an impact on the city's history."

Vinnie Mancuso of The New York Observer wrote, "I will never, ever get sick of watching villains break into the Gotham City Police Department, a place that, after three seasons of Gotham, I have to assume is staffed primarily by a gang of toddlers who found a bag of police costumes one summer and ran with it. Jim Gordon and Harvey Bullock are the only adults that work there but are so bad at detective work they still haven’t noticed." Lisa Babick of TV Fanatic gave the series a perfect 5 star rating out of 5, writing "What a jam-packed, crazy hour! On Gotham Season 3 Episode 19, Jim almost died (again), Penguin and The Riddler set aside their differences (for a little while anyway), Bruce became a puppet of The (no surprise) Court and Lee infected herself with the virus (big surprise!). That's a lot of action to dissect." Robert Yanis, Jr. of Screenrant wrote, "Gotham season 3 is racing for the finish line, with the show's long-running Court of Owls arc finally reaching some semblance of a conclusion. Of course, as with everything else in the eponymous city, even that storyline is far more complicated than it seems. The court's diabolical plans for Gotham collided last week with the Tetch virus that encompassed much of the season's first half, and now fans may already be getting their first glimpses of what's to come in the recently announced season 4."

Kayti Burt of Den of Geek wrote, "What, exactly, does this accomplish? It probably makes Lee hurt less, but I've never considered her to be a coward or someone that would put her own feelings above the safety of others. (After all, she did date Jim Gordon.) This felt like a contrived move for a character Gotham wasn't quite sure what to do with. That being said, as a character that Gotham wasn't quite sure what to do with, I'm pretty darn eager to see what Lee does next." MaryAnn Sleasman of TV Guide wrote, "It's just kind of a lot, all at once, with varying degrees of success in the realm of grabbing our interest. This is the part of the season where the wheels come precariously close to falling off, and I need Gotham to keep it together for just a few more episodes. We're so close to the end of what has generally been a strong season."
