= Light the Wick =

- Gotham episode
- Episode no.: Season 3 Episode 18
- Directed by: Mark Tonderai
- Written by: Tze Chun
- Cinematography by: Christopher Norr
- Editing by: Sarah C. Reeves
- Production code: T13.19918
- Original air date: May 15, 2017
- Running time: 43 minutes

Guest appearances
- B. D. Wong as Hugo Strange; Leslie Hendrix as Kathryn Monroe; Camila Perez as Bridgit Pike/Firefly; Raymond J. Barry as the Shaman

Episode chronology
← Previous "The Primal Riddle"	Next → "All Will Be Judged"
- Gotham season 3

"Light the Wick" is the eighteenth episode of the third season, and 62nd episode overall from the Fox series Gotham. The show is itself based on the characters created by DC Comics set in the Batman mythology. The episode was written by Tze Chun and directed by Mark Tonderai. It was first broadcast on May 15, 2017.

In the episode, Gordon discovers more about the impending judgment planned for Gotham City by the Court of Owls. He learns they possess the Tetch virus and plan on unleashing a weaponized version of it over Gotham. Meanwhile, Lee finds evidence that Frank Gordon's death could be a staged suicide rather than a homicide, and thinks Gordon is involved. Elsewhere, Cobblepot begins planning to finding Nygma and seeks Gordon's help with this, while Bruce continues his training with the Shaman.

The episode received generally positive reviews, with critics praising Gordon's storyline although Bruce's storyline and the slow progression received criticism.

== Plot ==
In Arkham Asylum, Barnes (Michael Chiklis) is escorted by orderlies outside the prison for transference. He uses his strength to break free. However, he is confronted by Talon, who sedates him, although with some difficulty. All these events are watched by Tetch (Benedict Samuel) from his cell. Barnes is brought to the Court where Kathryn (Leslie Hendrix) has Professor Strange (B. D. Wong) draw some of Barnes' blood.

Lee (Morena Baccarin) shows evidence to Bullock (Donal Logue), regarding Gordon's (Ben McKenzie) involvement in Frank's death, implying he may be involved in it. Ivy (Maggie Geha) visits Tabitha (Jessica Lucas) to ask for Selina (Camren Bicondova), discovering she is in hospital. She arrives at the hospital and is told by a doctor that Selina's injuries are so severe that she will probably die. Back in the Court, Strange is revealed to have weaponized the Tetch virus so that it can spread throughout the air. Meanwhile, Gordon takes samples from Kathryn's mask, sending these to Bullock.

Having received information on Kathryn's identity from Bullock, Gordon sets off to her residence to hopefully learn more about the weapon/threat, but almost immediately is met by Cobblepot (Robin Lord Taylor) and Bridgit (Camila Perez) who demand information regarding Nygma's (Cory Michael Smith) location, although Gordon negates his knowledge. Cobblepot gives him a phone in order to call him later. Gordon infiltrates Kathryn's house and finds a Wayne Enterprises key-card hidden in a drawer. Discovered by Kathryn, Gordon bluffs his presence and informs Kathryn about Cobblepot's suspicions. Kathryn speaks of the weapon, and Gordon deduces from her comments that the weapon is the Tetch virus

Elsewhere Bruce (David Mazouz) continues his training with the Shaman (Raymond J. Barry), who sends him into his parents' wake. He makes Bruce see the fact that he is still angry at his parents' death, and in order to move on, he needs to let it go. Arriving at the Wayne Enterprises lab the key-card accesses, Gordon and Bullock are attacked by a man infected with the virus. The man is stopped by Strange. Deducing they cannot arrest Strange without the Court bringing forward the release of the virus they opt to let him go, and in return, Strange gives them notes and a vial of the virus compound. Kathryn then calls Gordon.

Gordon meets with Kathryn at a reunion of socialites where the plan is to place a dispersal bomb loaded with the virus. After Kathryn leaves, Gordon gives a discreet call to Cobblepot to inform him of the bomb. Gordon is guarded by Talon to ensure his loyalty. With the time running out, Gordon attacks Talon and during the fight, Bridgit arrives and kills Talon with a flamethrower, causing everyone in the building to flee. Ivy uses medicinal plants in order to cure Selina's illness, who is hell bent on killing Five. Gordon finds Lee leaving the GCPD and after a final confrontation regarding Mario's death, she leaves. Cobblepot is kidnapped and jailed in a cell by the Court, reuniting with a shocked Nygma. Kathryn meets with Barnes, telling him that Gordon is a threat for them and tells him to kill him, deeming him a traitor. Barnes replies he's guilty and he'll be his "executioner".

== Production ==
=== Development ===
In April 2017, it was announced that the eighteenth episode of the season will be titled "Light the Wick" and was to be written by Tze Chun and directed by Mark Tonderai.

=== Casting ===
Sean Pertwee, Erin Richards, and Drew Powell do not appear in the episode as their respective characters. In April 2017, it was announced that the guest cast for the episode would include Leslie Hendrix as Kathryn, Camila Perez as Bridgit Pike/Firefly, Raymond J. Barry as the Shaman, and B. D. Wong as Hugo Strange.

== Reception ==
=== Viewers ===
The episode was watched by 2.98 million viewers with a 0.9/3 share among adults aged 18 to 49, a new series low. This was a slight decrease in viewership from the previous episode, which was watched by 3.03 million viewers with a 1.0/4 in the 18-49 demographics. With this rating, Gotham ranked second for FOX, behind Lucifer but beating Lucifer in the 18-49 demographics, fourth on its timeslot and ninth for the night behind a rerun of Kevin Can Wait, The Wall, two reruns of The Big Bang Theory, Man with a Plan, Scorpion, Dancing with the Stars, and The Voice.

The episode was the 58th most watched for the week in terms of viewership.

=== Critical reviews ===
Professional ratings
Review scores
Source	Rating
Rotten Tomatoes (Tomatometer)	100%
Rotten Tomatoes (Average Score)	6.87
IGN	6.6
TV Overmind	4.5/5.0 stars

"Heroes Rise: Light the Wick" received generally positive reviews from critics. The episode received a rating of 100% with an average score of 6.87 out of 10 on the review aggregator Rotten Tomatoes.

Matt Fowler of IGN gave the episode an "okay" 6.6 out of 10 and wrote in his verdict, "The return of Barnes and Hugo Strange provided some highlights in a rather harried chapter that rushed us through Jim's time as a man trying to thwart the Court from within."

Nick Hogan of TV Overmind gave the episode a 4.5 star rating out of 5, writing "Overall, this was a fantastic and exciting episode. Though I had some issues with the way it was executed, I’m still as excited as ever for what’s to come." Amanda Bell of EW gave the episode a "B" and wrote, "Two pieces of the puzzle are quickly coming together for the Court of Owls' plan to devastate Gotham, but there's one wild card they seemingly were not expecting: the return of Oswald Cobblepot from his watery grave."

Vinnie Mancuso of New York Observer wrote, "Until Steve Harvey becomes the Pope, there is not an actor-to-role combination better than Wong and Strange, except for maybe Wong and the transgender cyber-terrorist he plays on Mr. Robot." Robert Yanis Jr. of Screenrant wrote, "Gotham wisely delegates much of the focus on the aforementioned Court of Owls, which actually gets more screen time here than perhaps it ever has in a single episode."

Kayti Burt of Den of Geek gave the show a 3.5 star rating out of 5 and wrote, "Bringing in the Court of Owls has been a strike of genius for Gotham this season. By giving both our favorite heroes and our favorite villains a common antagonist in Kathryn and her Court, they are allowed to work together and interact in a way we have never quite seen from this show. Surely, it cannot last, but, for now, the boundaries between the protagonists and antagonists of Gotham have never felt more permeable and I love it." Megan Vick of TV Guide wrote, "After many tense episodes of separation, Gotham put Penguin and Nygma back together again -- at least physically."
