= Pretty Hate Machine (Gotham) =

- Gotham episode
- Episode no.: Season 3 Episode 20
- Directed by: Danny Cannon
- Written by: Steven Lilien & Bryan Wynbrandt
- Cinematography by: Christopher Norr
- Editing by: Barrie Wise
- Production code: T13.19920
- Original air date: May 29, 2017
- Running time: 43 minutes

Guest appearances
- Jada Pinkett Smith as Fish Mooney; B. D. Wong as Hugo Strange; Raymond J. Barry as the Shaman

Episode chronology
← Previous "All Will Be Judged"	Next → "Destiny Calling"
- Gotham season 3

"Pretty Hate Machine" is the twentieth episode of the third season, and 64th episode overall from the Fox series Gotham. The show is itself based on the characters created by DC Comics set in the Batman mythology. The episode was written by co-executive producers Steven Lilien and Bryan Wynbrandt and directed by Danny Cannon. It was first broadcast on May 29, 2017. The episode is named after the 1989 studio album by American industrial rock band Nine Inch Nails of the same name.

In the episode, Lee, influenced by the virus, decides to seduce Gordon into joining her in the chaos in order to acknowledge his darkness. Her plan involves kidnapping him and then burying him alive in order for him to inject himself with the virus as his only escape. Meanwhile, Bruce and the Shaman continue with their plan to take out the Court and set off the bomb with their intention to bring "the dark hero rise" while Alfred tries to find Bruce before time runs out. Cobblepot and Ivy are also being chased by Nygma and Barbara, who want Cobblepot dead.

The episode received positive reviews with critics praising the character development for characters but criticizing the rest of the subplots.

== Plot ==
The Shaman (Raymond J. Barry) and Bruce (David Mazouz) meet with the members of the Court to discuss the Waynes' murders. The Shaman then has the Talons to kill the Court members. The GCPD arrives later and finds one of the members barely alive who manages to say Bruce and Shaman's role in their deaths before dying of his wounds.

Nygma (Cory Michael Smith) informs Barbara (Erin Richards), Butch (Drew Powell), and Tabitha (Jessica Lucas) about Cobblepot's (Robin Lord Taylor) return and that he will go after them as they are all involved in his supposed death and sets to find him. Gordon arrives at Lee's (Morena Baccarin) house and finds her infected with the virus. She tries to seduce him, claiming he's infected with the darkness inside him and then knocks him out.

Cobblepot meets with Ivy (Maggie Geha) and Selina (Camren Bicondova) in their hideout when they are attacked by Nygma and Butch, with Selina escaping. This is part of Cobblepot's plan and he locks down Butch and Nygma in the hideout while he and Ivy escape but Selina is caught. Meanwhile, Bruce and the Shaman meet with Strange (B. D. Wong), who reveals the bomb that contains the virus. The Shaman states that they need to spread the virus in the city so that a "dark hero rises". Bruce, the Shaman and some Talons leave with the bomb when the place is raided by Bullock (Donal Logue) and Alfred (Sean Pertwee), who arrest Strange. Alfred tries to reach out to Bruce but he decides to leave with the Shaman.

In the GCPD, Strange is put in a cell when Lee arrives. Gordon wakes up and finds himself on a buried coffin with a little of time before oxygen runs out and a CB radio along with a syringe containing the virus. She explains they will need to find him quickly or he will need to inject himself in order to get out. They have her arrested and while Bullock and many officers go to search for Gordon, Alfred interrogates Strange for Bruce's location, revealing he's on Wayne Enterprises and that the bomb is set to detonate on a train station in just a few minutes. Seeing they won't find him, Gordon injects himself with the virus and uses his strength to get out of the coffin while Bullock sends a unit to the station for evacuation.

Cobblepot and Ivy set on her home but find that Selina gave the address to Nygma, Barbara, Tabitha and Butch, who arrive to take Cobblepot. Just then, Fish Mooney (Jada Pinkett Smith) arrives with her henchmen and takes Cobblepot with her. While the station is evacuated, Gordon arrives, planning to stop the bomb. However, he is stopped by Lee, who escaped her cell. Just as Bruce is about to trigger a detonator, Alfred arrives and tries to talk him out. The Shaman makes Bruce detonate the bomb and is shot by Alfred. Before dying, the Shaman tells Bruce that he needs to find the Yuyan Building and find "the Demon's Head" to fulfill his destiny. As an enraged Bruce attacks Alfred, he is arrested by the police. The bomb finally goes off and explodes in the station, spreading the virus while a cloud begins to spread it throughout the city.

== Production ==
=== Development ===
In May 2017, it was announced that the twentieth episode of the season will be titled "Pretty Hate Machine" and was to be written by Steven Lilien & Bryan Wynbrandt and directed by Danny Cannon. The episode is named after an album by Nine Inch Nails.

=== Casting ===
Chris Chalk, Benedict Samuel, and Michael Chiklis don't appear in the episode as their respective characters. In May 2017, it was announced that the guest cast for the episode would include Jada Pinkett Smith as Fish Mooney, Raymond J. Barry as Temple Shaman, and B. D. Wong as Hugo Strange.

== Reception ==
=== Viewers ===
The episode was watched by 3.03 million viewers with a 1.0/4 share among adults aged 18 to 49. This was a 3% increase in viewership from the previous episode, which was watched by 2.92 million viewers with a 1.0/4 in the 18-49 demographics. With this rating, Gotham ranked second for FOX, behind Lucifer but beating Lucifer in the 18-49 demographics, third on its timeslot and third for the night behind The Bachelorette, and an NHL game.

=== Critical reviews ===
Professional ratings
Review scores
Source	Rating
Rotten Tomatoes (Tomatometer)	100%
Rotten Tomatoes (Average Score)	6.87
IGN	6.6
TV Fanatic	5.0/5.0 stars
TV Overmind	4.5/5.0 stars

"Heroes Rise: Pretty Hate Machine" received positive reviews from critics. The episode received a rating of 100% with an average score of 6.87 out of 10 on the review aggregator Rotten Tomatoes.

Matt Fowler of IGN gave the episode a "good" 7.2 out of 10 and wrote in his verdict, "Gotham crammed a lot into its quasi-penultimate Season 3 chapter as the show's sloppiness collided with its elevated endgame stakes. Jim and Lee went full Tetch virus, Bruce went full League, and the gas bomb went off in the middle of town. Honestly, there are no rules at this point (Alfred's allowed to just point guns at people and/or dangle them from rooftops) so I'm curious to see how next week's two-parter will try and convince us that there's an actual police force in the city."

Nick Hogan of TV Overmind gave the episode a 4.5 star rating out of 5, writing "More than anything, this show got me excited for what's to come in next week's two part finale. They’ve built the excitement high, so hopefully it explodes properly instead of slowly fizzling out." Amanda Bell of EW gave the episode a "B" and wrote, "It might be a touch too obvious to call this week's episode of Gotham explosive, but that's exactly what it is. So many elements of evil are at work right now, and it looks like the city is about to go to war, with many unexpected factions suiting up for the end game."

Lisa Babick of TV Fanatic gave the series a perfect 5 star rating out of 5, writing "Okay. That was a lot of show to digest, but Gotham Season 3 Episode 20 was one hell of a penultimate episode! Gotham jumped off the deep end this hour, and I absolutely love them for it." Robert Yanis, Jr. of Screenrant wrote, "The days are numbered for Gotham season 3, and after this week, it appears that viewers may have seen the last of the Court of Owls, at least for now. With that storyline deftly coming to a close, the show is poised to break into an even bigger can of worms when it returns for season 4. But before that happens, there is the little matter of the season-long arc involving the Alice Tetch virus as well as the promised showdown between two of the series' best villains; namely, Penguin (Robin Lord Taylor) and Riddler (Cory Michael Smith). After last week's epic cliffhanger ending, it appears that Lee (Morena Baccarin) is taking a surprising turn in these last few episodes."

Kayti Burt of Den of Geek wrote, "'Pretty Hate Machine' was a non-stop hour of action, comic villainy, and absurd fun. This show is ridiculous, but it is having a lot of fun in its third season. Heading into its two-hour season finale, there is a lot to like about Gotham." MaryAnn Sleasman of TV Guide wrote, "This sort of prefabricated destiny, however, is why I've been having some trouble getting psyched for this particular part of the Court of Owls saga on Gotham. It's not that I don't like and appreciate Ra's al Ghul and the epic scale of the stories that tend to involve him, but... wasn't this essentially the plot of the Nolan-verse Batman films? I'm sure it's come up in the comics at least twice."
