= The Primal Riddle =

- Gotham episode
- Episode no.: Season 3 Episode 17
- Directed by: Maja Vrvilo
- Written by: Steven Lilien & Bryan Wynbrandt
- Cinematography by: Crescenzo Notarile
- Editing by: Barrie Wise
- Production code: T13.19917
- Original air date: May 8, 2017
- Running time: 43 minutes

Guest appearances
- Richard Kind as Aubrey James; Leslie Hendrix as Kathryn; Nathan Darrow as Victor Fries/Mr. Freeze; Camila Perez as Bridgit Pike/Firefly

Episode chronology
← Previous "These Delicate and Dark Obsessions"	Next → "Light the Wick"
- Gotham season 3

"The Primal Riddle" is the seventeenth episode of the third season, and 61st episode overall from the Fox series Gotham. The show is itself based on the characters created by DC Comics set in the Batman mythology. The episode was written by co-executive producers Steven Lilien and Bryan Wynbrandt and directed by Maja Vrvilo. It was first broadcast on May 8, 2017.

Nygma is told by Barbara about an organization that controls Gotham (the Court of Owls) and he sets out to discover it. In order to achieve this he kidnaps and interrogates newly-reinstated Mayor Aubrey James, additionally broadcasting a live TV message to lure out the Court and expose it to the public. Seeing the menace and fearing it could lead to exposure, Gordon is ordered to bring them Nygma as part of an initiation and prove his loyalty to them. Meanwhile, Cobblepot and Ivy begin uniting a group of villains in order to fight against Nygma and whoever else can oppose him. Five discovers that he is bleeding again, but this time receives shocking news.

The episode received positive reviews, with critics praising Nygma's character development and Cobblepot's subplot.

== Plot ==
Cobblepot (Robin Lord Taylor) and Ivy (Maggie Geha) travel to the Arctic and arrive at a lone structure. In it they meet Victor Fries (Nathan Darrow) who is angry at Cobblepot for causing him and all other freaks to flee Gotham during his mayor campaign. Cobblepot convinces Fries to join him and in exchange he will give Fries everything he needs to reverse his condition. They then present him his suit so he can go back to Gotham without the risk of exposure to warm temperatures.

Gordon (Ben McKenzie) meets with Kathryn (Leslie Hendrix) in the Court. She wants him to prove his loyalty to the Court. They manipulate Frank's body scene, a fact Gordon "discovers" at the GCPD, but Lee (Morena Baccarin) sees through this and suspects he is hiding something. Gordon and Bullock (Donal Logue) become aware that Nygma (Cory Michael Smith), now being called "The Riddler" by the press, has struck again. Nygma is visited by Barbara (Erin Richards), who wants to know more about the organization that controls Gotham. Nygma remembers Strange worked for an organization in Indian Hill and seeks to find out more. Later, and as part of his plan to learn about the Court, Nygma kills actors during a play in front of Gotham's elite.

In Wayne Manor, Five (David Mazouz) continues posing as Bruce, but also discovers that he is bleeding again. He meets with Kathryn, who tells him that he has limited time before he dies. Gordon and Bullock investigate Nygma's theater crime and find a box that contains a riddle signaling a "two-faced politician". Determining this is Mayor James, Gordon and Bullock arrive at his office where they find him eating Danishes made by a "citizen". When he tries to take a pill for his (presumed) indigestion, he discovers question marks in the pills. James' is taken to hospital but Nygma had caused an explosion at a biker gang's, so the bikers fill and riot in the hospital's A&E. During the commotion Nygma takes James. With Fries on side, Cobblepot and Ivy then visit Bridgit (Camila Perez), who is now working in a steelworks. They convince her to join them, and while leaving she kills her boss.

Nygma and Barbara interrogate James, who tells about an organization that controls Gotham - "The Court". Nygma then broadcasts on TV a hostage situation, planning on killing James if the Court is not exposed. Gordon is tasked to bring Nygma to the Court in order to prove his loyalty. He is reluctant, but agrees. Gordon then calls Nygma and promises to tell him everything about the Court if he comes to the GCPD. Nygma agrees but tells him to empty the department. Nygma takes James with a bomb around his neck. However, Gordon with the help of Tabitha (Jessica Lucas) neutralize the device, freeing James. Gordon then leaves with Nygma.

Five visits Selina (Camren Bicondova), revealing his true identity and telling her to leave Gotham. Selina refuses, telling him he is not like Bruce and the she plans to tell Alfred (Sean Pertwee) who he is, but Five pushes her out of her apartment window to the sidewalk, seemingly killing her. Then, a group of cats begin to swarm around her. Gordon takes Nygma to a location where they meet with Kathryn, who tells Nygma to get in her car so he can find all the answers he needs. Barbara confronts Tabitha and Butch (Drew Powell) for neutralizing the device and storms off when she proves that she wants full control. Cobblepot, Ivy, Fries and Bridgit arrive in Dahl Manor while discovering about Nygma's activities. The episode ends as Kathryn introduces the Court to Gordon, officially becoming a member and donning a mask.

== Production ==
=== Development ===
In April 2017, it was announced that the seventeenth episode of the season will be titled "The Primal Riddle" and was to be written by co-executive producers Steven Lilien & Bryan Wynbrandt and directed by Maja Vrvilo.

=== Casting ===
Chris Chalk, Benedict Samuel, and Michael Chiklis do not appear in the episode as their respective characters. In April 2017, it was announced that the guest cast for the episode would include Richard Kind as Aubrey James, Leslie Hendrix as Kathryn, Camila Perez as Bridgit Pike/Firefly, and Nathan Darrow as Victor Fries/Mr. Freeze.

== Reception ==
=== Viewers ===
The episode was watched by 3.03 million viewers with a 1.0/4 share among adults aged 18 to 49. This was a slight increase in viewership from the previous episode, which was watched by 3.02 million viewers with a 1.0/4 in the 18-49 demographics. With this rating, Gotham ranked first for FOX, behind Lucifer but beating Lucifer in the 18-49 demographics, fourth in its timeslot and seventh for the night behind Man with a Plan, The Wall, Scorpion, Kevin Can Wait, Dancing with the Stars, and The Voice.

With Live+7 DVR viewing factored in, the episode had a rating of 1.6 in the 18–49 demographic. With Live+7 DVR viewing factored in, the episode had an overall viewership of 4.56 million viewers and a rating of 1.6 in the 18–49 demographic.

=== Critical reviews ===
Professional ratings
Review scores
Source	Rating
Rotten Tomatoes (Tomatometer)	100%
Rotten Tomatoes (Average Score)	7.12
IGN	7.5
TV Fanatic	4.0/5.0 stars
TV Overmind	4.0/5.0 stars

"Heroes Rise: The Primal Riddle" received positive reviews from critics. The episode received a rating of 100% with an average score of 7.12 out of 10 on the review aggregator Rotten Tomatoes.

Matt Fowler of IGN gave the episode a "good" 7.5 out of 10 and wrote in his verdict, "This week's Gotham stuck by Riddler's side as he launched an official 'investigation' into the Court of Owls, showing that his only goal is to be the top intellectual mind in the city, regardless of who he's pitted against. This character, like Jerome/Joker, is working out really well, and he's still fun to watch outside of the context of Batman. The rest of the show, though, feels like it's rushing its teenage characters into places they shouldn't get to for another decade."

Nick Hogan of TV Overmind gave the episode a 4 star rating out of 5, writing "Overall, this was a good episode. I'm more excited, however, on where it leads next. Several dangling plot threads should come to a head over the next few weeks, which has the potential to be exciting as the show has ever been." Amanda Bell of EW gave the episode a "B−" and wrote, "This week, some of Gotham's strongest alliances are literally tossed out the window while others are being formed. Ed Nygma is back to do his worst as the Riddler — albeit with less vexing wordplay this time — while the Court of Owls is ready to take Jim under its proverbial wing. Meanwhile, Bruce's doppelganger's endgame is coming into view, and Penguin and Ivy are recruiting their 'Army of Freaks' just in time for a busy day."

Vinnie Mancuso of New York Observer wrote, "If it's one thing Gotham has consistently been for three seasons it's an upward trajectory into Batshit Crazyville, always escalating its characters into weirder, more intense places." Lisa Babick of TV Fanatic gave the series a 4 star rating out of 5, writing "I love the Penguin and Ivy relationship. They make a great team. It's going to be interesting to see what they're going to do and how they plan to take back control of Gotham." Robert Yanis, Jr. of Screenrant wrote, "After building up its roster of iconic Batman villains over the past season and a half, Gotham is poised for all-out war to break out among the rogues gallery by the time season 3 comes to a close. Last week's episode saw Penguin and Ivy launch a mission to assemble an “army of freaks” to take on Riddler, Barbara and the rest of the reigning criminal underworld. Now, 'The Primal Riddle' sees both Penguin and Riddler ready themselves for the battle ahead, as the latter closes in on the Court of Owls. It seems he may be ready to solve the greatest riddle of all, but how will the court's planned 'cleansing' of Gotham affect the supervillains' agendas?"

Kayti Burt of Den of Geek wrote, "Selina better not be dead. I mean... I don't think Gotham would do that (and characters here have survived much worse than a two-storey fall), but I'm just putting that out there. Selina is one of the best parts of this show and, if she goes, Gotham will be the poorer for it." Kaitlin Thomas of TV Guide wrote, "It can be done and Gotham seems to specialize in the crazy and the extreme, especially when finale time rolls around. You can't blame a girl for being nervous though. Gotham also specializes in chronic uneven storytelling and repeated identity crises. This could really go either way -- so let's just sit back and enjoy the freak show."
