= Destiny Calling (Gotham) =

- Gotham episode
- Episode no.: Season 3 Episode 21
- Directed by: Nathan Hope
- Written by: Danny Cannon
- Cinematography by: Crescenzo Notarile
- Editing by: Sarah C. Reeves
- Production code: T13.19921
- Original air date: June 5, 2017
- Running time: 43 minutes

Guest appearances
- Jada Pinkett Smith as Fish Mooney; B. D. Wong as Hugo Strange; Nathan Darrow as Victor Fries/Mr. Freeze; Camila Perez as Bridgit Pike/Firefly; Alexander Siddig as Ra's al Ghul

Episode chronology
← Previous "Pretty Hate Machine"	Next → "Heavydirtysoul"
- Gotham season 3

"Destiny Calling" is the twenty-first episode of the third season, the first part of the two-part season finale, and 65th episode overall from the Fox series Gotham. The show is based on the characters created by DC Comics set in the Batman mythology. The episode was written by executive producer Danny Cannon and directed by Nathan Hope. It was first broadcast on June 5, 2017.

In the episode, Gotham is currently in chaos with most of the citizens infected with the Tetch virus. While Gordon struggles to contain the virus inside him, he and Bullock continue looking for an antidote. They plan to have Hugo Strange develop the antidote, but they find that he has been taken by Fish Mooney, Penguin, and their gang for their own purposes. However, Nygma and Barbara also want the antidote to control the city, but Butch and Tabitha are planning to betray them. Meanwhile, Bruce finally comes face to face with the man he was looking for: Ra's al Ghul.

== Plot ==
Gotham City is in chaos with nearly all citizens infected with the Tetch virus. In the GCPD, Gordon (Ben McKenzie), Bullock (Donal Logue) and Alfred (Sean Pertwee) begin interrogating Bruce (David Mazouz) in an attempt to destroy the Shaman's brainwash.

Fox (Chris Chalk) tells them about an antidote that has been designed by Hugo Strange (B. D. Wong). Gordon and Bullock arrive at the train station in order to stop Strange from leaving Gotham, but Strange is taken by Fish Mooney (Jada Pinkett Smith). Gordon and Bullock confront Fish and try to get back Strange, but Victor Fries (Nathan Darrow) arrives and creates an ice barrier that enables them to escape. Meanwhile, Nygma (Cory Michael Smith) and Barbara (Erin Richards) set out to find and kill Cobblepot (Robin Lord Taylor). Alfred tries to save Bruce from the brainwashing but it fails, and Bruce even comments that the Court is just paving the way for "the one to come".

In the GCPD, Alvarez, infected by the virus, attacks the other officers, killing and wounding many until Alfred jumps him and Felix knocks Alvarez out. During this, Bruce escapes his cell and sets out to find the building the Shaman instructed him to go. Meanwhile, Butch (Drew Powell) and Tabitha (Jessica Lucas) considered working with Fish in order to kill Nygma. Strange is brought to Dahl Manor where Cobblepot puts the same device that Strange used on him in Arkham Asylum in order to develop find and control the antidote. Cobblepot and Strange accompany Fish, Fries, and Bridgit (Camila Perez) to a slaughterhouse in order to get the antidote. Suddenly, members of the League of Shadows arrive and demand the antidote. Fries and Bridgit fend off the assassins and then Gordon and Bullock arrive; they kill the assassins but then, Gordon accidentally stabs Fish, causing her to drop the antidotes, which shatter on the floor. She dies in Cobblepot's arms. Seeing no choice, Strange then suggests using Tetch's (Benedict Samuel) blood as a way to make a new antidote. However, Barbara, Tabitha and Butch intercept his transfer van and take Tetch.

Bruce finds the building and enters a secret passage leading to a hallway filled with assassins from the League. They guide him to a room that contains a glowing pool and a man (Alexander Siddig). The man tells Bruce that the Shaman fulfilled his job and introduces himself as the "Demon's Head": Ra's al Ghul. Ra's explains that he's been alive for a very long time and that he is looking for a new heir: Bruce. To test Bruce, he brings Alfred into the room and orders Bruce to prove his worth by killing Alfred, giving him a sword to do this with. Despite Alfred's pleas, Bruce impales the sword through his chest.

== Production ==
=== Development ===
In May 2017, it was announced that the twenty-first episode of the season will be titled "Destiny Calling" and was to be written by Danny Cannon and directed by Nathan Hope.

=== Casting ===
Camren Bicondova, Maggie Geha, and Michael Chiklis don't appear in the episode as their respective characters. In May 2017, it was announced that the guest cast for the episode would include Jada Pinkett Smith as Fish Mooney, Alexander Siddig as Ra's al Ghul, Camila Perez as Bridgit Pike/Firefly, Nathan Darrow as Victor Fries/Mr. Freeze, and B. D. Wong as Hugo Strange.

== Reception ==
=== Viewers ===
Airing back to back with the next episode, the episode was watched by 3.17 million viewers with a 1.0/4 share among adults aged 18 to 49. This was a 4% increase in viewership from the previous episode, which was watched by 3.03 million viewers with a 1.0/4 in the 18-49 demographics. With this rating, Gotham ranked third on its timeslot and third for the night behind The Bachelorette, and an NHL game.
