= The Coverup =

2008 film by Brian Jun

- Directed by: Brian Jun
- Written by: Roberts Dean Klein; Stuart M. Pepper; Michael Sausville
- Produced by: Lorena David; Mark A. Roberts
- Starring: Eliza Dushku; Brian Krause; John Savage; Gabriel Mann; Michelle Horn; Michael Welch; Lee Garlington; Brandon DeShazer
- Cinematography: Ryan Samul
- Release date: October 18, 2008 (Austin Film Festival)
- Country: United States
- Language: English

The Coverup, previously known as The Thacker Case, is a 2008 crime-thriller film directed by Brian Jun and starring Gabriel Mann and Eliza Dushku. The film is based on a true story.

== Plot ==
In 1984, Kevin Thacker of Iowa is a repeat drunk driving offender, and when he is taken into the Marshalltown, Iowa, police station and questioned for his latest DUI, he attempts to escape. When he is found deceased in an alley behind the station, the town police report he attempted to jump from the roof of the station to a nearby building, a gap too far for him to clear. He fell, and was killed on impact.

However, the parents of Kevin Thacker disagree with this story. They suspect that he was murdered by Kendall Eldred, the police officer who questioned him. They seek the help of a personal injury attorney, Stuart M. Pepper, who works to find the evidence to prove that this was not an accidental death, but a deliberate murder and case of police brutality.

Attorney Pepper takes Eldred to court and uses evidence of Thacker's injuries, the crime scene itself, and time constraints around the time of death to disprove the possibility of Kevin Thacker falling from the rooftop. Pepper's arguments prove successful, and the court eventually finds Kendall Eldred guilty of the murder. It was all a massive cover-up made by the Marshalltown police department to hide the guilt of an officer. The truth came to light, and it was discovered that an unarmed, defenseless Kevin Thacker was killed in cold blood due to a blow from Officer Eldred.

== Cast ==
- Gabriel Mann as Stu Pepper
- Eliza Dushku as Monica Wright
- John Savage as Thomas Thacker
- Michael Welch as Kevin Thacker
- Alison Brie as Grace

== Release ==
The film wrapped production the middle of 2008 and made it around in the festival circuit having screenings in the Austin Film Festival, the Hollywood Film Festival, the St. Louis International Film Festival, and the Cedar Rapids Film Festival.
