= St. Louis International Film Festival =

Annual film festival

- Official logo
- Location: St. Louis, Missouri, U.S.
- Established: 1992
- Language: English
- Website: cinemastlouis.org

The St. Louis International Film Festival (also known as SLIFF or Cinema St. Louis) is an annual Oscar-qualifying film festival in St. Louis, Missouri, which has been running since 1992. The coordinating organization changed its name to "Cinema St. Louis" in 2003. The festival screens approximately 300 films over a period of 10 days during November.

== History ==
SLIFF was established in 1992 for the purpose of producing, promoting, and presenting annual film events to advance film as an art form. In its first year, 25 films were shown during the last week of April, to an overall audience of 4,500.

In 1993, the festival incorporated as a Missouri not-for-profit organization, and screened 33 films, with an increase of attendance by 20%. In 1994, the festival lasted 10 days, with films showing in three theaters, and 11 film directors attended their St. Louis premieres. 1994 also saw the founding of Cinema St. Louis, now known as Friends of the St. Louis International Film Festival, the membership society of the festival, which contributes financially and provides volunteer support.

In 1995, the festival moved from April to November and grew to include the St. Louis premieres of more than 50 films. Two annual awards were initiated: the juried Fox Theatre First Feature Award and the Audience Choice Award. The fourth year also saw the debut of the Spring Sampler, an April event that included 10 screenings and several visiting filmmakers.

A New Filmmakers Forum was introduced in 1996. By 1997, attendance at the festival had grown to over 10,000. Twenty-eight guest filmmakers attended, and a special feature included an opening weekend Star Tribute to screen legend Tony Curtis at the Fox Theatre, where a Hollywood Film Artist Award was presented.

In 1998, Delcia Corlew was named the festival's managing director, and the offices moved to its current headquarters in St. Louis’ Central West End. The Seventh Annual Festival in 1998 included a sidebar titled "A Separate Cinema", which featured films dating from 1915-1965 featuring all-black casts for African-American audiences.

In 1999 and 2000, the festival continued to expand the range of its offerings, especially in the areas of documentary and short films. The number of awards the festival presents also grew; in 2000, they included the Emerson Electric Audience Choice Award, the Leon Award for Best Documentary, the Interfaith Award, the Fox Theatre Emerging Filmmaker Award, the Best of Fest Short Film Award and the Emerging Actor Award.

Cliff Froehlich was named executive director in 2001 and remained in that position until his departure in April 2003. That year the festival officially changed its name to Cinema St. Louis. Froehlich returned as executive director in 2006. Eventually, Froehlich retired, and Bree Maniscalco took over the role in July of 2022 coming from her role as development director for Cinema St. Louis.

As of 2008, the festival's artistic director is Chris Clark, and operations supervisor is Brian Spath.

The 2009 fest included a gala event for the movie Up in the Air, which was largely filmed in St. Louis, featuring a Q&A session with director Jason Reitman.

SLIFF has commissioned two new film scores composed and premiered at the festival by The Rats & People Motion Picture Orchestra: Benjamin Christensen's Häxan for the 2010 festival and Ernst Lubitsch's Die Bergkatze for the 2011 festival.

== Selected highlights ==
=== Featured films ===
- Chungking Express, 1995, Dir. Wong Kar-wai
- Happiness, 1998, Dir. Todd Solondz
- All About My Mother, 1999, Dir. Pedro Almodóvar
- Kinsey, 2004, Dir. Bill Condon
- Up in the Air, 2009, Dir. Jason Reitman

=== Awards ===
- Emerson Audience Award 1999, Boys Don't Cry, Dir. Kimberly Peirce
- SAG Emerging Actors Award 2000, Peter Sarsgaard
- New Filmmakers Forum Emerging Director 2000, Steel City, Dir. Brian Jun
- Lifetime Achievement Award 2002, Kevin Kline
- Cinema St. Louis Award 2005, Cedric the Entertainer
- Short Short Award 2010, 1925 aka Hell, Dir. Max Hattler
