= The Resurrection of Ra's al Ghul =

Comic book series

- Dust jacket of the hardcover of "The Resurrection of Ra's al Ghul", art by Andy Kubert.
- Publisher: DC Comics
- Publication date: October 2007 – March 2008
- Genre: Superhero; Crossover
Title(s)
Batman Annual #26
Robin Annual (Volume 4) #7
Batman #670
Robin (Volume 4) #168
Nightwing (Volume 2) #138
Detective Comics #838
Batman #671
Robin (Volume 4) #169
Nightwing (Volume 2) #139
Detective Comics #839
Detective Comics #840
- Main character(s): Batman; Robin; Nightwing; Ra's al Ghul; Talia al Ghul; Damian Wayne; Sensei; I Ching

Creative team
- Writer(s): Grant Morrison; Peter Milligan; Fabian Nicieza; Paul Dini
- Artist(s): Tony Daniel; Freddie E. Williams II; Don Kramer; Ryan Benjamin
- Batman: The Resurrection of Ra's Al Ghul: ISBN 1-4012-1785-0

"The Resurrection of Ra's al Ghul" is an eight issue comic book crossover story arc published by the comic book publishing company DC Comics in 2007 and 2008. It involves the return of notable Batman villain Ra's al Ghul, and is his first appearance since his apparent death in Batman: Death and the Maidens in 2003. It also connects back to the "Batman and Son" storyline, which introduced Damian as the son of Batman and Talia al Ghul.

== Plot ==
Talia al Ghul and her son Damian Wayne discover that Ra's al Ghul has returned from the dead and is searching for Damian. Ra's hopes to use Damian's life force to keep himself stable. Damian runs to the Batcave to seek help from the Bat family as the League of Assassins closes in on his whereabouts. Batman, who has been in Asia, returns home to help. Despite their best efforts, the Bat family cannot stop the League's ninjas from kidnapping both Robin and Damian and taking them to Ra's in Tibet.

Damian leaves Robin alone with Ra's Al Ghul, who offers him a chance to bring his parents back to life. Meanwhile, outside Lhasa, Batman and Talia are getting closer to Ra's only to run into more of his henchmen. Batman, Talia, and I-Ching find a secret entrance to Ra's's headquarters. On meeting, Ra's and Batman begin to fight, but since Ra's body is already dead, nothing hurts him. He then brings out Robin and Damian, offering Batman a choice on which one's body he should take. Batman offers his own body, but Ra's refuses, craving a younger one.

Batman takes Ra's to Nanda Parbat wherein lies the Fountain of Essence. The temple of the Fountain is under attack by the Sensei, who is revealed as Ra's al Ghul's father, and more fighting ensues. Batman knocks Sensei into the Fountain of Essence, which kills him for not being a pure soul. The monks of Nanda Parbat check Ra's Al Ghul's body, but the spirit of Ra's possesses one monk's body and walks away.

Robin, still haunted by Ra's offer to restore his loved ones to life, seeks out The White Ghost, who tells Robin that he can restore them, but only if Tim swears his undying loyalty to Ra's Al Ghul and forsakes Batman. Robin agrees, and is sent to a chamber with a Lazarus Pit to be "reborn". There he is confronted by Nightwing, who swears to stop him. Between attacks, Robin debates with his adopted brother. I-Ching mediates to stop the fight.

The three find Talia and fly to Nanda Parbat, where Ra's is about to claim Damian's body as his vessel at last. Batman intervenes to defend his son and the two begin to defend themselves when their reinforcements arrive. Damian chooses to assist Batman over escaping with Talia. The monks seal themselves off totally from outsiders. Ra's life is finally preserved by White Ghost, actually his disowned son Dusan. Aboard the jet with Dick, Tim and Alfred, Bruce ruminates on the value of family.

In an epilogue, Ra's moves his base of operations to Gotham City. Batman infiltrates Ra's' new headquarters and easily defeats his horde of ninjas and Ra's himself. Batman takes an unconscious Ra's directly to Arkham.

== Publication history ==
The story was featured in publication across the four main Batman-related titles, and ran through December 19, 2007. The creative teams for the four books and their corresponding parts in the story are:

- Batman #670-671 - Prelude and Part 4 by Grant Morrison and Tony Daniel
- Robin #168-169 - Parts 1 and 5 by Peter Milligan and Freddie E. Williams II
- Nightwing #138-139 - Parts 2 and 6 by Fabian Nicieza and Don Kramer
- Detective Comics #838-840 - Parts 3, 7 and Epilogue by Paul Dini and Ryan Benjamin / Dustin Nguyen

All parts except the epilogue were collected into one volume: Batman: The Resurrection of Ra's al Ghul (256 pages, May 7, 2008, ISBN 1-4012-1785-0). Detective Comics #840 can be found in Batman: Private Casebook (160 pages, December 23, 2008, ISBN 1-4012-2009-6).
