= Nanda Parbat =

Fictional city in the DC Comics universe

- First appearance: Strange Adventures #216 (February 1969)
- Created by: Neal Adams

In-universe information
- Type: Hidden city
- Locations: Hindu Kush, Pakistan
- Publisher: DC Comics

Nanda Parbat is a fictional city in the DC Comics universe. It first appeared in Strange Adventures #216 (February 1969), created by Neal Adams. It is named after the Himalayan peak Nanga Parbat of Pakistan.

== History ==
Nanda Parbat is a hidden city nestled high in the mountains of the Hindu Kush. It is a place of healing and enlightenment watched over by the goddess Rama Kushna and her monks. Time moves slower in Nanda Parbat than the outside world.

Rama Kushna is known as the entity responsible for turning aerialist Boston Brand into the ghostly Deadman. As her spiritual agent, Brand wanders the Earth possessing the bodies of the living and doing good works, in the hopes of finding eventual access to paradise. Deadman has returned to Nanda Parbat on occasion to defend it against attackers such as the Sensei of the League of Assassins, an aged warrior at one time possessed by Jonah, another of Rama Kushna's former agents.

=== Invisible map ===
A map had been used to reach Nanda Parbat in the story arc The Resurrection of Ra's al Ghul written by Grant Morrison and Paul Dini. The map is supposedly composed of seven pieces, including a tattoo, a scrap of parchment, a poem, and a birthmark.

=== Notable appearances ===
Rama Kushna and Nanda Parbat have also played a role in the lives of other DC Comics characters:

- Judomaster lived in Nanda Parbat before joining L.A.W. It is responsible for his slowed aging.
- The Crimson Avenger spent time in Nanda Parbat, seeking meaning in the senseless violence he witnessed in World War I. During his convalescence, he received a vision of the future and witnessed the death of Superman.
- In 52, the Question (Victor Sage) takes Renee Montoya to Nanda Parbat to be trained by martial arts master Richard Dragon. It is just outside Nanda Parbat that the Question dies from lung cancer.
- In Batman #663, Batman enters the state of Nirvikalpa Samadhi using a technique he learned in Nanda Parbat to find a pattern to the Joker's recent murders.
- In Reign in Hell, Deadman, Zachary Zatara, Jason Blood, Kid Devil, and Blood's friend Randu Singh travel to Nanda Parbat to help Rama Kushna balance the forces of good and evil.
- In Blackest Night, Deadman tries to recover his own body in Nanda Parbat but is rejected several times, so he uses other Black Lanterns' bodies trying to discover how to use his own body and how to destroy the Black Lanterns. Phantom Stranger helps him and they enter Nanda Parbat.
- In Brightest Day, Saint Walker and Renee Montoya hold Victor Sage's funeral in Nanda Parbat.
- In Detective Comics Annual #12, Renee Montoya goes to Nanda Parbat trying to get rid of the Mark of Cain, while Richard Dragon let her go to Penemue who tried to get the mark for himself.
- In Justice League Dark #13, the Books of Magic are hidden in Nanda Parbat, which Felix Faust and Doctor Mist acknowledge as a place of great power.

== In other media ==
=== Television ===
- Nanda Parbat appears in the Justice League Unlimited episode "Dead Reckoning".
- Nanda Parbat appears in the Arrowverse series Arrow and Legends of Tomorrow.
- Nanda Parbat appears in Gotham. Ra's al Ghul is the city's Minister of Antiquities, a status he exploits to invoke diplomatic immunity after being arrested.

=== Film ===
- Nanda Parbat appears in Batman Begins.
- Nanda Parbat appears in Batman: Soul of the Dragon.

=== Video games ===
- Nanda Parbat appears in DC Universe Online.
- Nanda Parbat appears in Lego DC Super-Villains.
