= Brian Jun =

American film director, writer and editor

- Born: Brian Joseph Jun; October 21, 1979 (age 45); Alton, Illinois, United States

Brian Jun (born October 21, 1979) is an American film director, screenwriter, film editor and producer. Jun's feature film debut was the working-class drama, Steel City, which garnered a nomination for the Grand Jury Prize Award at the Sundance Film Festival in 2006.

== Early career ==
Since he was a child, Jun always had an interest in film and literature; inspired by the work of Sam Shepard, Neil Simon and Samuel Beckett. This manifested an interest in becoming an actor or playwright, but he ultimately began to write screenplays.

Jun attended Webster University in St. Louis, where he learned the basics of filmmaking. Jun's first work was the short film For Jimmy Brown, a hospital drama dealing with racial issues. The film was based around conversations between two characters, played by Dennis Lebby and Jun himself. A screening of the film at the Los Angeles Shorts Film Festival led to the opportunity to make another short for Fox Searchlab; a program run by Fox Searchlight Pictures with the aim of nurturing up-and-coming talent. The result of this was Researching Raymond Burke, a short featuring John Heard. Jun's original plan was for this to be a teaser for a feature film entitled In the World of Raymond Burke, but he did not manage to acquire the capital to produce the film and the project was abandoned.

== Steel City ==
The collapse of this project inspired Jun to make his next film on a much lower budget. The product of this was the film Steel City. John Heard had remained interested in working with Jun and his involvement with the new film led to interest from Your Half Pictures. This marked the end of two years of searching for a production company as the Los Angeles firm agreed to produce the film. The idea of family breakdown interested Jun and a mix of this idea with midwestern economic downturn formed the basis for Steel City. In addition to Heard, the film starred America Ferrera and Raymond J. Barry, who later received a nomination for best supporting actor from the Spirit Awards for his role in the film.

The film received a nomination for the grand prize jury award following its screening at the Sundance Film Festival in 2006. The film was generally received well by critics: reviews from both The New York Times and Entertainment Weekly praised the strength in depth of the supporting characters. However both also acknowledged the debut film's flaws. The New York Times notes flaws in the script: "Heard has to utter the wince-inducing line "I wanted to be a better dad," but mostly Mr. Jun's script is sharp". Entertainment Weekly summarised that "Steel City could have used more rhythmic drive, but if Jun keeps weaving together characters this compelling, he could be a major film artist in the making". Time Out also pointed out that the film had the teething problems of a first effort but otherwise praised the script and the casts performance.

== Later work ==
Jun wrote and directed his second feature film The Coverup, a drama featuring Eliza Dushku, which was released in 2008. His third, Joint Body, was released in 2011.

In 2007 Jun was hired to write and direct a biopic of musician Jeff Buckley, but the project was abandoned.

Jun served as a "screen writer in residence" at Interlochen Arts Academy High School in 2011-2012.

Jun has taught film and video courses at both Webster University and Lindenwood University in St. Louis.

== Filmography (as Writer / Director) ==
Year	Film
2001	For Jimmy Brown
2002	Researching Raymond Burke
2006	Steel City
2008	The Coverup (formerly The Thacker Case)
2011	The Bandit (aka Joint Body)
2012	She Loves Me Not
2014	Sleep With Me
2018	Ray (documentary short)
