= Joint Body =

- Directed by: Brian Jun
- Screenplay by: Brian Jun
- Produced by: James Choi; Brian Jun; Max Velez
- Starring: Mark Pellegrino; Alicia Witt
- Cinematography: Ryan Samul
- Edited by: Brian Jun
- Music by: Alec Puro
- Production company: 40/West
- Distributed by: Level 33 Entertainment
- Release date: April 29, 2011 (USA)
- Running time: 86 minutes
- Country: United States
- Language: English

Joint Body is a 2011 American crime thriller film written and directed by Brian Jun and starring Mark Pellegrino and Alicia Witt. The film is about a convict who is abandoned by his ex-wife and prevented from seeing his young daughter. As a parolee he develops a relationship with a lonely and troubled woman, whom he saves from a violent attack, killing the assailant in the process. Once more on the run, he is forced to re-evaluate his freedom as he evades the law and faces demons from his past. The film was shot on location in various small towns in southern Illinois: Alton, Wood River, East Alton, and Jerseyville. Produced by James Choi, Brian Jun, and Max Velez for 40/West, the film premiered on April 29, 2011 at the Newport Beach Film Festival.

== Plot ==
While doing time in prison for a violent offense, Nick Burke is visited by his wife who informs him that after waiting for seven years, she is divorcing him and has taken out a restraining order against him to prevent him from seeing their daughter. Sometime later, after accepting the parole board's condition that he relinquish all custodial rights of his daughter, he is given his freedom. Now in his mid-forties and determined to start a new life, Nick tries to find his way back into society and move beyond his violent criminal past. He meets with his parole officer, finds a small motel room, and attends an AA meeting.

Nick's younger brother Dean visits him at the motel and describes his life as a newlywed and police officer, having just graduated from the police academy. Although their relationship seems strained, Nick still looks to connect with his brother, even though he never visited him in prison. Before leaving, Dean gives his older brother a gun for protection. Nick soon finds work at a manufacturing plant.

At the motel, Nick meets a lonely and troubled stripper named Michelle Page, whose isolated life is interrupted by the deaths of her elderly neighbors. Nick asks his attractive neighbor out for coffee, and the two begin to share their stories with each other.

One morning, Michelle's former acquaintance Danny Wilson, whom she hasn't seen in three years, shows up after his three-year tour of duty in Afghanistan, expecting to rekindle their relationship. Michelle hardly knows this man who has developed an obsession over her. When Michelle rejects his advances and his demands for a personal reward for his service to his country, he sticks a gun in her face and brutally rapes her in her room. Hearing the commotion, Nick runs to her room with his brother's gun in hand. In the confrontation, both men are shot — Danny is mortally wounded.

In the coming days, Michelle visits Nick in the hospital as he recovers from his gunshot wound to the stomach. When he learns that Danny died from his wounds, and knowing that he violated his parole and would be sent back to prison—no matter how good his intentions in stopping the attack, Nick leaves the hospital with Michelle's help, and the two drive to the home of Nick's brother Dean and his pregnant wife. There they get a glimpse of a domestic life they have never known. The relationship between the two brothers remains strained, yet Nick reaches out to make some familial connection with Dean, whose only advice is to "disappear".

The next morning, Nick and Michelle leave in Nick's old truck, knowing they have become outlaws on the run. They find solace in each other's arms that night in a motel. Soon after, police detectives arrive at Dean's house with the gun he gave his brother. Convinced that Michelle gave the gun to police, when Nick calls, Dean tells him that she betrayed him. Later, Nick confronts Michelle about the gun, and she swears she did not give it to the police — that they must have discovered where she had hidden the weapon. That night they have sex.

In the morning, Michelle discovers that Nick has abandoned her, perhaps for her own protection. Later, back at her motel, Michelle is arrested by the police and she is taken to jail. Meanwhile, Nick drives to his daughter's school and meets one of her teachers, who tells him she is doing fine. After school, he observes his daughter leaving with her friends, but he does not approach her. Sometime later, on a quiet deserted lake, Nick floats across the water in his old boat.

== Cast ==
- Mark Pellegrino as Nick Burke
- Alicia Witt as Michelle Page
- Bellamy Young as Jane Chapman
- Tom Guiry as Danny Wilson
- Ryan O'Nan as Dean Burke
- Carlos Michael Hagene as Club Patron
- Robert Nolan Clark as Shop Foreman
- Vis Brown as Commissioner Ryan
- Matthew Linhardt as Todd
- Emma Ve as Lawyer
- Daesha Lynn as Caroline 'Chaz' Burke
- Matthew Terry as Ex-convict
- James Anthony as Cappy Knight
- Bradley Blackorby as Unnamed Cop
- Paul Strathman as Lawyer at Hearing
- Michael W. McClure as Doctor
- Scott Woelfel as Cop #1

== Production ==
=== Filming ===
Joint Body was filmed on location in various small towns in southern Illinois, USA.

=== Soundtrack ===
The soundtrack included the song "About Me", written and performed by Alicia Witt.

== Critical reception ==
In his review in Cranes Are Flying, Robert Kennedy wrote that Pellegrino and Witt are "both excellent", but that the film suffered from the director's script, which was "abysmally weak". Kennedy went on to write:

The narrative couldn't be more hackneyed and stereotypical, where there's no investment whatsoever in a unique idea or vision, where the audience is rather appalled at the choices the characters make, as they appear to be smarter than that. It's a waste of good performances.

== Releases ==
Joint Body was released on DVD on July 24, 2012.
