= Steel City (film) =

- Directed by: Brian Jun
- Written by: Brian Jun
- Produced by: Rusty Gray; Ryan Harper; Brian Jun
- Starring: John Heard; Tom Guiry; America Ferrera
- Cinematography: Ryan Samul
- Edited by: Brian Jun
- Music by: Mark Geary
- Release date: January 2006 (Sundance)
- Running time: 95 minutes
- Country: United States
- Language: English

Steel City is a 2006 American drama film written and directed by Brian Jun and starring John Heard, Tom Guiry and America Ferrera.

== Cast ==
- John Heard as Carl Lee
- Tom Guiry as P.J. Lee
- America Ferrera as Amy Barnes
- Clayne Crawford as Ben Lee
- Laurie Metcalf as Marianne Karn
- Raymond J. Barry as Vic Lee

== Reception ==
The film has an 83% rating on Rotten Tomatoes. Time Out gave it four stars out of five. Owen Gleiberman of Entertainment Weekly graded the film a B+.
