= Vis Brown =

American television and film actor

- Born: Pervis Damone Brown; November 2, 1975 (age 50); St. Louis, Missouri, U.S.
- Occupations: Actor, Producer
- Years active: 2003–present
- Spouse: Jenna Y. Rice (m. 2012) Christal M. Vivian (2007–2010)
- Children: 1 child
- Website: http://www.visbrown.com/

Vis Brown (born November 2, 1975) is an American television and film actor.

== Early life and education ==
Brown was born in St. Louis, the son of Pervis Brown, a business owner and Thelma Brown, a teacher. The youngest of three, Brown attended and graduated from Ladue Horton Watkins High School in Ladue, Missouri in 1994. In the fall, he attended Xavier University of Louisiana, where he earned a bachelor's degree in English. Afterwards, he enrolled at St. Ambrose University in Davenport, IA, where he earned a master's degree in Business Administration (MBA). While working in Baltimore, Maryland, Brown discovered a love for the theater and stage performing. His performing interests had been brewing since he was a child. He quickly secured a talent manager and began working on small productions.

== Career ==
In 2002, Brown decided to move to Los Angeles to pursue his passion for performing. In order to hone his skills, he enrolled and began training at the Ruskin School of Acting in Santa Monica, CA, studying the Meisner technique. After securing a talent manager and agent, Brown quickly earned his SAG card and started booking roles in theater, independent film and television.

Vis made his film debut in the DVD comedy, Malibu Spring Break, starring Playboy Playmate Pilar Lastra and directed by Kevin Lewis (The Third Nail). Vis earned a co-starring role on NBC's Crossing Jordan, starring Jill Hennessy in 2006. In 2007, Vis booked his first major feature film, The Lucky Ones (film), starring Rachel McAdams, Tim Robbins & Michael Pena. The Lucky Ones, a Lionsgate Films release is directed by Neil Burger, director of The Illusionist (2006 film) .

== Filmography ==
=== Film ===
- Malibu Spring Break (2003)
- Bashing (2004)
- Sex, Shoes & Unicorns (2005)
- The Lucky Ones (2008)
- Ben & Alex (2010)
- Joint Body (2011)
- Fatal Call (2012)
- The Box (2015)

=== Television ===
- Crossing Jordan (2006)
