= About a Teacher =

- Directed by: Hanan Harchol
- Written by: Hanan Harchol
- Produced by: Hanan Harchol
- Starring: Dov Tiefenbach; Tibor Feldman; Kate Eastman; Aurora Leonard; Leslie Hendrix
- Cinematography: Kai Dekassian
- Release date: April 7, 2020
- Running time: 112 minutes
- Country: United States
- Language: English

About a Teacher is a 2020 American drama film written and directed by Hanan Harchol and starring Dov Tiefenbach, Tibor Feldman, Kate Eastman, Aurora Leonard and Leslie Hendrix.

== Cast ==
- Dov Tiefenbach as Mr. Harchol
- Leslie Hendrix as Ms. Murry
- Aurora Leonard as Ana Martinez
- Tibor Feldman as Daddy
- Tyler Hollinger as Mr. McKenna
- Joseph Diaz as Mateo
- Cedric Preval as Lamar
- Kate Eastman as Rachel

== Release ==
The film was released on April 7, 2020.

== Reception ==
The film has a 100% rating on Rotten Tomatoes based on seven reviews. Andrew Stover of Film Threat scored the film an 8 out of 10.

Frank Scheck of The Hollywood Reporter gave the film a positive review and wrote as the bottom line: “A compelling drama about education, minus the Hollywood hokum.”
