= Ra's al Ghul =

DC Comics supervillain

- Interior artwork of Ra's al Ghul in Batman: One Bad Day: Ra's a Ghul #1.

Publication information
- Publisher: DC Comics
- First appearance: Batman #232 (June 1971)
- Created by: Dennis O'Neil (writer); Neal Adams (artist); Julius Schwartz (concept/name)

In-story information
- Team affiliations: League of Assassins; Secret Society of Super Villains; Council of Immortals; Legion of Doom; The Demon
- Partnerships: Ubu; Talia al Ghul
- Notable aliases: The Demon's Head; The Demon "Terry Gene Kase"
- Abilities: Genius-level intellect; Criminal mastermind; Master strategist and tactician; Master martial artist, hand-to-hand combatant, and swordsman; Enhanced longevity, healing, and resurrection via Lazarus Pits

Ra's al Ghul (Arabic: رأس الغول) (Note: commonly pronounced as Re'sh, hence /ˈreɪʃ ˌæl ˈɡuːl/ RAYSH al GOOL or /ˈrɑːz ˌæl ˈɡuːl/ RAHZ al GOOL; "the Head of the Ghoul" or, in a rougher translation, "the Chief Demon".) is a supervillain appearing in American comic books published by DC Comics, commonly as an adversary of the superhero Batman. Created by editor Julius Schwartz, writer Dennis O'Neil, and artist Neal Adams, the character first appeared in Batman #232's "Daughter of the Demon" (June 1971).

Most notably the immortal founder and leader of the League of Assassins and its sects, his name in Arabic means "Head of the Ghoul" and it was inspired by the Arabic name of the star Algol, the Demon Star (Schwartz said that it was inspired by reading it in an astronomy book). Having been born several hundred centuries before the 20th century, the character has prolonged his life through the Lazarus Pits, a supernatural pool of water with restorative properties that allows him to extend his lifespan. With his extended lifespan and his wide breadth of knowledge afforded by his immortality, he seeks to use his organizations' resources to aid his eco-terrorist agenda to cleanse the Earth of corruption and restoring the environment. His extreme methods has pitted him against Batman, being formidable enough to be an adversary rivaling him in combat. The character has fathered various children, including Talia al Ghul and Nysaa Raatko, the former a love interest of Batman and the mother of his grandson, Damian Wayne. Having a chauvinistic streak, the character has sought male successors to his organizations (which has included Batman and Damian) but has also rescinded the inclination, having been succeeded by both of his daughters at various intervals. Given his high status as a supervillain, he has also come into conflict with Superman and other heroes in the DC Universe.

Ra's al Ghul has been featured in various media adaptations. The character was portrayed by David Warner in the DC Animated Universe, Liam Neeson in the Dark Knight trilogy, Jason Isaacs in Batman: Under the Red Hood, Dee Bradley Baker in the Batman: Arkham video game series, Matt Nable in the Arrowverse television series, and Alexander Siddig in Gotham.

IGN's list of the Top 100 Comic Book Villains of All Time List ranked Ra's as number seven.

== Publication history ==
Created by editor Julius Schwartz, writer Dennis O'Neil, and artist Neal Adams, he was introduced in Batman #232's "Daughter of the Demon" (June 1971). Adams discussed how he designed the character in a 2007 Wizard interview: "First of all, Denny O'Neil started as a journalist, and so his experience with costume characters was always a forced experience. When the idea came to Julie Schwartz that "we're kind of reviving old characters. What do we want to do for a new character?" Denny's tendency - and I understood it totally - was not to go to a costumed character with superpowers, but to go to a Moriarty type. When Denny presented it, here I was as a comic-book artist who was used to doing fairly realistic stuff having to deal with, "Hey, no costume." How do I make him unique? Because after all, we are pandering to our audience a little bit. How does he become unique? So, I sort of went down the list of things that I could do that didn't offend my sensibilities as an artist and as a person that lived in the world. How do you make a person unique? And then I realized there are people that look unique, that present their personality with their physiognomy - like Jack Palance, for example. Jack Palance is incredible to look at."

== Character overview ==
Raʼs al Ghul is an international criminal mastermind whose ultimate goal is a world in perfect environmental balance. He believes that the best way to achieve this balance is to eliminate most of humanity. Ra's usually tries to assault the world's human populace with a biological weapon, such as a genetically engineered virus. He is aided in this quest by the Lazarus Pits, reservoirs of rejuvenating chemicals that restore the dead and dying to life, a reference to the biblical story of Lazarus, who was resurrected by Jesus; these pits have granted him a lifespan of several centuries. He regards Batman as his worthiest opponent, addressing him as "Detective" out of respect for his intellectual brilliance, and has frequently sought to make the Dark Knight his successor. He is one of the few criminals in Batman's rogues' gallery to have deduced his secret identity as Bruce Wayne, but keeps silent on the matter due to the same sense of respect for Batman. For his own part, Batman's opposition to Raʼs is complicated by both his own respect for al Ghul's genius (if not his goals and methods) and his attraction to his daughter, Talia, which she reciprocates.

== Fictional character biography ==
=== Origin ===
Ra's al Ghul's real name, early life, and exact age have been described differently by various writers. His post Crisis origin story is told in the graphic novel Batman: Birth of the Demon (1992) by Dennis O'Neil and Norm Breyfogle. This origin story is later revisited and amended in Batman Annual #26 (2007) by Peter Milligan and David López as part of the Batman: The Resurrection of Ra's al Ghul story arc. The most recent retelling of the origin story, Batman and Robin (vol. 2) #23.3 (2013) by James Tynion IV and Jeremy Haun, references these prior iterations of al Ghul's origin, while keeping common details that lead towards Ra's' adoption of the moniker (e.g. Ra's' occupation as a physician, his wife's death, and the annihilation of the Sultan's city).

As told in Birth of the Demon, Ra's al Ghul (known only as the Physician prior to adopting the moniker) was born over 600 years before his first appearance in Batman comics, to a desert tribe in eastern North Africa, near a wealthy city governed by a sultan. Developing an interest in the sciences at an early age, Ra's abandoned his tribe to live in the city, where he focused himself on learning and experimentation. He subsequently trained as a physician and married a woman named Sora.

Upon discovering the healing properties of the Lazarus Pit, Ra's managed to save the Sultan's dying son by lowering him into it. He is unaware, though, that use of the Lazarus Pit can induce insanity, and the prince (who is already sadistic and cruel), emerges as a mentally unstable sociopath. He proceeds to fatally strangle Sora, on whom he has already had his eye for some time. The sultan, unwilling to admit to himself his son's culpability, accuses Ra's of poisoning his son's mind and sentences him to a slow, tortured death in a cage with Sora's corpse.

Ra's is set free by the son of a dying elderly woman, who Ra's had earlier treated. The son feels that he owes Ra's a debt for easing his mother's suffering during her last few hours. Ra's and the son head into the desert to seek the tribe of Ra's' birth. Ra's convinces the head of his tribe, his uncle, to follow Ra's in his quest for revenge by promising the downfall of the oppressive sultan. By understanding the germ theory of disease hundreds of years before anyone else, Ra's is able to infect the prince with a deadly virus by sending him contaminated fabrics. He then ambushes the sultan when he leads soldiers to the tribe, murders his son and him, and proceeds to massacre the inhabitants of the city before razing it to the ground. Subsequently, Ra's declares himself "Ra's al Ghul", the "Demon's Head".

Batman: Birth of the Demon provides a rough figure of 500 years for Ra's al Ghul's age. Due to living so long and being so old, he is assumed to have lost track of how old he is. Azrael #6 (July 1995; written by Dennis O'Neil) places Ra's age closer to 450 years. As he tells Jean-Paul Valley, "I appear to be a vigorous 50. I am actually a very vigorous 448...or is it 453? I lost count during the Black Plague. No matter". In Batman Annual #25 (published in 2006), Ra's al Ghul is described as a "700-Year Old International Terrorist". The 700-year-plus mark is used again in Batman and Robin (vol. 2) #23.3 (2013), followed by Issue #30 of the same series where over a 1000-year time span is also described in Ra's' pursuit of Themyscira.

Using the Lazarus Pits to extend his life, Ra's spends the next several centuries journeying the world. He fights in the French Revolution and the Napoleonic Wars and becomes a formidable warrior. As the world entered the modern age and industrialization began to cover much of the Earth, Ra's grew to despise the humans, whom he believed were destroying the world's natural beauty, thus setting him on a path of ecoterrorism. Also during this time, Ra's, his uncle, and Huwe, the son who freed Ra's from the sultan's initial execution, are all using the Lazarus Pits to prolong their lives until an incident in London. Ra's catches Huwe writing his own memoirs in their original Chinese language, despite Ra's having forbidden him to reveal the secret of their immortality. During a battle, Ra's kills Huwe and flees to a Lazarus Pit, which he uses. When he returns to their home in London, his uncle has vanished with the remnants of their historical records.

Over time, he becomes a master of many forms of combat, notably fencing. He also builds up vast wealth and creates the Demon, a huge international organization. According to Justice League of America (1st series) #94:

It has been whispered in the darkest places for 500 years that a cartel of criminals has slowly sucked its way into the rich veins of the Earth. Many are its names spit from the mouths of men, but most often it is cursed only as. The Demon. It has a leader. A Head.

The League of Assassins, one of the many smaller organizations making up The Demon, is thus sometimes called "The Demon's Fang" or "Demonfang".

In his earlier appearances, Ra's al Ghul's ethnic origins were subject to change depending on the depiction and writer. He is said to have partial East Asian ancestry in accordance to Birth of the Demon. Talia Al Ghul addresses Ra's Al Ghul as having a "Byzantine life" suggesting Byzantine ancestry as well. The significance of al Ghul's Eurasian profile is attributed to his known paternal heritage whilst his ambitions for world conquest is often compared and traced to the likes of Alexander the Great; an influence too shared by other family members such as Sensei (Batman #671 (2007) by Grant Morrison and Tony S. Daniel), Talia al Ghul, and Damian Wayne (Batman and Robin (vol. 2) #0 (2012) by Peter J. Tomasi and Patrick Gleason) (the name "Damian" being derivative of "damianos", Greek for "to tame"). Most commonly depicted in source material with a dominant phenotype of fair complexion, Ra's has also been able to opportunistically be involved in Western world global exploits such as the Age of Exploration (Year One: Batman/Ra's al Ghul #2 (2005) by Devin K. Grayson and Paul Gulacy) and the Third Reich (Batman: Death and the Maidens #5 (2004) by Greg Rucka and Klaus Janson). Ra's al Ghul's adoptive use of Arabic monikers and the language itself is a result of al Ghul's settlement and cultured history both in erudition and regional pursuit of Lazarus Pit/longevity sources most commonly unearthed throughout the Greater Middle East (e.g. The Well of Sins in the Arabian Peninsula, Red Hood and the Outlaws #22 (2013) by James Tynion IV and Julius Gopez) to East Asia (Peaches of Immortality, Year One: Batman/Ra's al Ghul #1). The use of Arabic monikers in particular (in regards to demons) is used as a scare tactic in Ra's' history promoting both his influence, and reign of terror throughout the Greater Middle East—his first eradication of a sultanate as described in Birth of the Demon, the same actions insinuated to have been repeated in Batman and Robin (vol. 2) #23.3, and direct depiction in Death and the Maidens #4.

Aligning with Ra's al Ghul's character overview as an international environmental terrorist, in conjunction with the character's background being subject to different renditions from multiple writers; co-creator of the character, Neal Adams, has stated that the character has no specific regional/ethnic representation of any kind, necessarily.

"...we created an equal to Batman, and that's what Ra's al Ghul is all about. He's not necessarily Arabic. He's not necessarily Eastern. He's not necessarily Western. He's not necessarily anything! He's just a villain and he's equal to Batman." - Neal Adams, via SYFY WIRE Batman at 80: How To Craft The Perfect Batman Villain

In the 21st century, Ra's has explicitly been established as being of Chinese (though this may no longer be canon) and Arab ancestry. In the 2007-2008 story The Resurrection of Ra's al Ghul, his father was revealed to be the DC Comics character the Sensei, a warrior and combat instructor who is a member of the League of Assassins. The Sensei is a Chinese man originally from the Hong Kong region. However, Ra's' relation to the Sensei may no longer be canon due to the reveal of his father being a part of the Pre-Flashpoint/Post-Crisis DC continuity that ended in 2011. In 2021, DC introduced Ra's' mother Rúh al Ghul, an Arab woman. Ra's and the rest of the al Ghul's Arabic heritage and connection to Arabic culture has been given greater emphasis since the late 2010s.

=== Contagion and Legacy ===
Ra's returns to prominence and comes dangerously close to realizing his dream of worldwide genocide in the "Contagion" story arc of the Batman titles. His organization unleashes a deadly virus known as Ebola Gulf A (a.k.a. "The Clench") in Gotham City, putting Batman in conflict with a force he seemingly cannot defeat. A cure is eventually located by Batman and his allies, though the mastermind behind the outbreak is not discovered until the follow-up story "Legacy".

Learning that the Demon's Head still lives, Batman and his team circle the globe, preventing further outbreaks of the virus. Ra's allies himself with Bane, the man who once crippled and nearly killed Batman. Ra's considers Bane a potential heir to his empire, despite his daughter Talia's distaste for the criminal mastermind. Eventually, Batman deduces a way to eliminate the Clench virus from an ancient "Wheel of Plagues" artifact whose knowledge has aided Ra's in the creation of the disease. The long-lived madman eludes justice again.

=== JLA: Tower of Babel ===
In the "Tower of Babel" storyline, in JLA #43–46, Ra's discovers Batman's contingency plans for stopping the other members of the Justice League of America, should they turn or be turned evil, and uses them to try to destroy the group. Meanwhile, Ra's steals the bodies of Batman's parents. This theft prevents Batman from realizing Ra's is using his traps until it is too late, as he is distracted by the search for the corpses of his parents.

Though defeated, Ra's does cause the temporary exit of Batman from the JLA, who now distrust the Caped Crusader. However, though some of the League resent Batman's plans, they eventually accept that the plans were created for the right reasons once Batman confirms that he trusts them by revealing his secret identity to the rest of the team.

Talia, disillusioned with her father, leaves the League to run LexCorp for former U.S. President Lex Luthor, before selling the company to Bruce Wayne for his Wayne Foundation to aid Batman and Superman's victory over Luthor. Ra's blames Batman for his failed relationship with Talia, and stages a plot where he tries to separate Batman from his heir, Dick Grayson, shortly before Wayne officially adopts his former ward as his son. The plan fails, and Wayne and Grayson proceed with the adoption.

Ra's is also featured in Birds of Prey #31–35, where he has a romantic fling with the Black Canary. The superheroine is injured and healed in the Lazarus Pit, which also restores the Canary Cry she lost years earlier.

=== Death and the Maidens ===
In Death and the Maidens (2004), Ra's' other daughter, Nyssa Raatko, furious at her father for abandoning her in a Nazi concentration camp during World War II, begins plotting to destroy him, prompting Ra's to contact Batman to make a deal for access to a Lazarus Pit to give him the strength for a final confrontation with Nyssa; in exchange for the location of a Pit, Ra's provides Batman with a serum that will allow him to walk in the spirit world and speak with his parents. While Batman experiences his "vision", Nyssa befriends Talia and then kidnaps and brainwashes her. Nyssa plots to destroy all hope and optimism in the world by assassinating Superman with Kryptonite bullets she steals from the Batcave. While Batman stops Nyssa from killing Superman, he is unable to stop her from mortally injuring her father. A dying Ra's reveals that this is all part of his greater plan to ensure that his daughters will realize that he is correct in his perceptions about the world and what needs to be done to it, and that they would come to accept their destinies as his heirs. Ra's' plan works: both Nyssa and Talia become the heads of The Demon and the League of Assassins. Talia disavows her love for Bruce Wayne, and both sisters declare Batman their enemy. It is too late for Ra's, as Nyssa stabs her father through the heart, seemingly killing him for good. To ensure Ra's will not return, Batman oversees his nemesis' cremation.

=== The Resurrection of Ra's al Ghul ===
Ra's al Ghul returns from the dead. Art by Tony Daniel.

Ra's al Ghul returns in the form of his own son Dusan al Ghul, Arabic: دوسان الغول, "The White Ghost". Art by Ryan Benjamin.

In Batman Annual #26, Talia is prompted to read the history of Ra's al Ghul to her son Damian by a mysterious figure from Ra's' past: the White Ghost. Unbeknownst to her, the White Ghost plans to use Damian as a vessel for Ra's' return. However, mother and son escape before the plan is completed. After the escape, Batman confronts the White Ghost; he fights Batman, but accidentally falls into a Lazarus Pit.

As of Batman #670, Ra's al Ghul has returned, having evaded death by transferring his consciousness into the body of another. Because his host body is decaying from radiation poisoning, he needs to transfer his mind into another host body. His first choice is that of his grandson Damian Wayne, but Damian escapes to alert his father.

Upon taking Ra's to a "Fountain of Essence", which contains the qualities of a Lazarus Pit, Batman is confronted with the sight of the Sensei, who is revealed to be Ra's' father. After defeating Ra's, Sensei fights and impales Batman with a cane. Determined to win, Batman drags the Sensei into the Fountain, where he is killed for not being a pure soul. Ra's, meanwhile, has taken over the body of a Nanda Parbat monk and departs. Healed by the Fountain, Batman emerges and yells for Ra's.

Ra's attempts to make amends with Batman after his resurrection, but Batman responds by crushing his decaying fingers. Ra's accepts this latest rebuke and, with the help of his men, overpowers Batman and captures Damian, who has arrived to try to help his father. Ra's attempts to take over Damian, but Batman breaks free just as Robin, Talia, Alfred Pennyworth, and Nightwing arrive to save him. While the battle ensues at Nanda Parbat, the White Ghost takes Ra's to a secluded place, where he appears to accept the fact that his death is inevitable. The White Ghost is revealed as Ra's' estranged albino son Dusan, and offers up his own body instead. Ra's performs the transfer of souls, but the White Ghost apparently dies soon afterward. Ra's resumes the battle and attempts to kill Batman, but the monks at Nanda Parbat stop him and banish him from the temple.

Following his resurrection, Ra's al Ghul, in his new body, moves his base of operations to Gotham City where it is revealed that a remnant of his son Dusan's consciousness still remains within him. Since the White Ghost was his son, Ra's was able to use the resemblance between them to modify his new body's appearance to be more like his own, though he remains an albino. This arrogance contributes to the brazen move to Gotham and a subsequent ninja attack on Batman, which indirectly leads to the discovery of a map of all the known Lazarus Pit locations across the globe. Batman then infiltrates Ra's al Ghul's new Gotham penthouse headquarters and easily defeats his horde of ninjas and Ra's himself. To ensure Ra's is not a constant threat within Gotham City, Batman comes up with the false identity of "Terry Gene Kase", and plants it along with credible photos, medical records, and police records for both Blackgate Penitentiary and Arkham Asylum. Batman takes an unconscious Ra's directly to Arkham where it is believed he really is the prisoner "Terry Gene Kase", a criminal with multiple personality disorder who has just been transferred to Arkham to finish out multiple life sentences. Along with attaching false information and a false identity to Ra's al Ghul's file, Batman attaches a false prescription of potent medication that ensures slurred speech and next to zero mobility.

Despite these precautions, Ra's eventually escapes when the orderlies miss his dosage once, which allows him to become conscious enough to escape from Arkham.

=== The Return of Bruce Wayne ===
Ra's realizes that Batman has apparently died after Darkseid's invasion during Final Crisis. After confronting Nightwing with his knowledge, he and the hero eventually duel with swords. Nightwing defeats Ra's and earns the immortal's respect, signified by leaving his sword in the Batcave as a gift after their fight. Ra's refuses to believe his enemy's death despite the evidence, leading him to be involved in Red Robin's (Tim Drake) quest concerning the fate of the original Dark Knight. After Tim finds proof that Wayne is still alive but lost in time after his battle with Darkseid, Tim cripples Ra's' organization, the League of Assassins, from within. In response, Ra's returns to Gotham to begin his attack to destroy every legacy of the Wayne Family. While his men target everyone close to the Waynes, Ra's makes a pact with Hush as part of his plans. Unknown to both men, Lucius Fox has already given Tim power of attorney leaving him in control of the Wayne family's resources.

Enraged, Ra's then engages Tim Drake in combat, which ends with Tim mocking Ra's by saying that there's nothing he can do to harm the Bat Family anymore; in response, Ra's smiles and says "Well done. Detective" (a name he has only ever reserved for Batman, Nightwing and Red Hood once before). He then proceeds to kick him out of a skyscraper window and retreats from the battle. Later, in seclusion, Ra's reveals everything which happened was a test for Tim, from the league, the council, the Men of Death, and the plot against Bruce Wayne.

Learning of Bruce Wayne's return, Ra's muses that his next confrontation with the detective will be particularly interesting as he believes that Batman has at last had a taste of the immortality that Ra's himself enjoys.

He goes after Vicki Vale and almost kills her. He spares her life only after she refuses to publish the identity of Batman and gets rid of all of the evidence she has to that effect. He also realizes that Vale may be a descendant of a French opponent, Marcel du Valliere, from centuries before; therefore, his business with her may not be finished.

=== The New 52 ===
In The New 52 (a 2011 reboot of the DC Comics universe), Ra's al Ghul appears in a hooded robe at the League of Assassins' city of 'Eth Alth'eban. He enters the Well of Sins after an encounter with Jason Todd. When he emerges, Ra's is consumed by the evil that corrupted the Untitled centuries before, and he feels compelled to rid himself of the machinations of his daughter and Ducra by killing Jason. At Ra's' command, the prisoners are brought to him, and he promises to use his newfound power to destroy them. Red Hood engages Ra's, as Essence joins the battle. She insists that he will allow Jason and his friends to leave his realm, or he will be forced to die a mortal death just as he always feared he would. Despite having destroyed the All-Caste, Ra's al Ghul's actions have led to their eventual rebirth. Defeated, he swears that he will visit great agony upon Red Hood if he ever sees him again.

Batman and Aquaman head to an island, where the League of Assassins are located, after Ra's has the bodies of Damian Wayne and Talia exhumed. Ra's had ordered the hunt of whales, creating genetically altered super-humans in the wombs of sperm whales, part of a plan to rebuild the League of Assassins. Inside the compound, they find that Ra's is wiping the hard drives clean, preventing data recovery. As his parting gift, he has left Batman the Heretics to keep him entertained. Batman fights his way to Ra's escape aircraft. He sees Talia and Damian's bodies stored within it, and clings to the fuselage from outside as the plane takes off. Though Ra's plans to go to Paradise Island, he is nearly surprised to see Batman pounding on the cockpit's windshield. From outside, Batman screams for Ra's to give back his son, but Ra's responds that he is blood of Damian's blood and the boy is in good hands. He orders the plane to tilt its angle, causing the wind shear to rip Batman from his purchase and drop down into the sea, where he is caught by Aquaman.

Batman and Ra's then encounter Glorious Godfrey. Glorious Godfrey's reason to come to Earth is to retrieve the Chaos Shard, a powerful crystal once belonged to Darkseid which Ra's al Ghul revealed was hidden inside the sarcophagus he crafted for Damian.

During Batman Eternal, Bruce briefly speculates that Ra's is the mastermind behind most of the attacks against him that have left Wayne Enterprises bankrupt and Batman pushed to the limit. However, when he confronts Ra's, his foe reveals that, while he was invited to participate in the attack by the true mastermind, he rejected the offer as Ra's would prefer to destroy Batman when the Dark Knight believes that his legacy will be as eternal as Ra's, rather than tear him down in such a manner.

=== DC Rebirth ===
During DC Rebirth, Ra's al Ghul is featured in Detective Comics issues #953-956 as part of the "League of Shadows" story arc, which runs from issue #951-956 (April–July 2017).

Ra's al Ghul appears in Dark Nights: Metal issue #2 as a member of the Immortals, a group formed by the oldest beings in the multiverse. He participates in a discussion on how they will fight the Dark Multiverse invasion.

== Powers and abilities ==
Due to repeated exposure to the Lazarus Pits, which can heal any injury and restore him to life, he has both an extended lifespan and sometimes has heightened endurance, strength, and healing. Some stories have also granted him limited powers in magic, having some skill in necromancy and siphoning life force to sustain his own or logomancy capable of erasing the memories of others. He has also demonstrated the power to transfer his souls into others to continue his existence if he is not able to resurrected by the Lazarus Pit. Ra's once temporarily gains vast magical powers after bathing in the Well of Sins, the first Lazarus Pit.

Due to his expanded life span, Ra's has accumulated knowledge and abilities. These include detective skills, chemistry, physics, military tactics, economics, and martial arts, fully using his photographic memory to master all such skills. He has also gained many international contacts and an immense fortune over the course of centuries. When in combat, he favors more ancient weaponry —these weapons include scimitars, katanas, spears, staffs, bolas, shurikens, smoke pellets and miniaturized explosives.

== Family ==
The following are members of Ra's al Ghul's family:

=== Sensei ===
Created by Neal Adams in 1968, the Sensei was originally introduced as a high-ranking member of the League of Assassins. He was portrayed as an aged but highly skilled martial artist. During The Resurrection of Ra's al Ghul, he is revealed to be Ra's al Ghul's centuries-old father and subsequently killed.

=== Mother Soul ===
Created by Joshua Williamson and Gleb Melnikov in 2021, Mother Soul is the mysterious head of the "League of Lazarus". In Robin (vol. 3) #7, she is revealed to be Ruh al Ghul (Soul of the Demon), Ra's al Ghul's mother.

=== Nyssa Raatko ===
Created by Greg Rucka and Klaus Janson in 2003, Nyssa Raatko (Arabic: نيسا رعتكو) is Ra's al Ghul's oldest known daughter. She was born the only child to Ra's al Ghul's mistress Amina Raatko, also known as Lourdes in 18th century Russia. She would later become a Holocaust survivor. She is murdered by Cassandra Cain during the One Year Later storyline.

=== Dusan al Ghul ===
Created by Peter Milligan and David Lopez in 2007, Dusan al Ghul (Arabic: دوسان الغول) was Ra's' only known son. He was also referred to as Ash'Shabah Al-Abyad (Arabic: الشبح الأبيض), meaning "the White Ghost". Though little is known about his past, it is stated that he was born out of a union meant to strengthen his father's hold over "some long-extinct people", suggesting that he was older than Ra's' other children. As an albino, he was never considered a potential heir to his father's empire. He ultimately sacrificed himself to ensure his father's survival during the Resurrection of Ra's al Ghul storyline.

=== Talia al Ghul ===
Created by Dennis O'Neil and Bob Brown in 1971, Talia al Ghul (Arabic: تاليه الغول) is Ra's al Ghul's daughter. Like Ra's, Talia's mother was a woman of mixed Chinese and Arab ancestry named Melisande, who met Ra's at the Woodstock festival.

=== Damian Wayne ===
Originally appearing as an unnamed infant in the 1987 graphic novel Batman: Son of the Demon, the character was introduced as Damian Wayne or Damian al Ghul (Arabic: دميان الغول) by Grant Morrison and Andy Kubert in 2006. Damian is the son of Bruce Wayne and Talia al Ghul, making him the grandson of Ra's al Ghul. He is an Heir to the Demon Head and expected to one day lead the League. Ra's raised him to be the new Alexander the Great. He is bred from birth to take and rule the world by his mother Talia al Ghul. He was very aggressive until he met his father, Batman. Batman taught him how to calm himself and trained him to be the new Robin. His genetic perfection marks him as the ideal host for his grandfather, who wants to take over his body.

=== Mara al Ghul ===
Created by Benjamin Percy and Jonboy Meyers, the character debuted in Teen Titans (vol. 6) in December 2016. Mara al Ghul is a granddaughter of Ra's al Ghul, daughter to the late Dusan al Ghul and a cousin to Damian Wayne. Introduced as an enemy to Damian, she was also raised by the League of Assassins. She and Damian were both members of the Demon's Fist, an elite group within the League. Damian was supposed to lead the Demon's Fist, but Mara now leads the group instead since Damian chose to side with his father over the League. Mara hates Damian after he left her with a scar across her right eye during a training session when they were younger. Mara has not inherited her father's albinism; she has black hair with red bangs. Like the rest of her family she is a skilled fighter, and is also noted to be a talented artist.

=== Athanasia al Ghul ===
Athanasia al Ghul is a character featured in the Injustice 2 prequel comic, who does not exist in the Prime Earth continuity. She is the daughter of Bruce Wayne and Talia al Ghul, sister of Damian Wayne, and granddaughter of Ra's al Ghul. Athanasia is the secret daughter of Talia and Bruce and raised by Talia without Bruce's or even Damian's knowledge. While Talia allowed Damian to become a hero and work with his father for a time, she kept Athanasia a secret from her father and raised her as a member of the League of Assassins.

=== Others ===
Although he fathered children with several women, Ra's al Ghul has only two confirmed marriages. The first was to Sora, whose death set Ra's on the path to becoming the "Demon's Head". The second was to Melisande, Talia's mother.

Ra's also appears to have an unnamed sister or half-sister, a female assassin belonging to a group called the "Daughters of Acheron", whose members share the same father. Another member is a woman using the alias "Promise". It is unclear if their common father, "Acheron", is in fact the Sensei (making them all Ra's' half-sisters) or if Ra's only has one half-sister on his mother's side.

In Batman and Robin #12, it is revealed that Talia has cloned her son, Damian who's known as "The Heretic" The clone is, therefore, a grandson of sorts of Ra's al Ghul. Additionally, Nyssa once stated that she has given birth twelve times (only two of her children, Daniel and Hannah, are named), opening the possibility of Ra's having many other descendants, although most of Nyssa's family are murdered by the Nazis and Nyssa believes that her great-grandson Vasily (a Russian soldier who is reported to have been killed in the Middle East) was the last of her line.

The Birth of the Demon features Ra's' uncle, who helps him avenge his wife and found the League of Assassins before they go their separate ways.

== Involvement with Batman ==
After Talia encounters and falls in love with Batman in Detective Comics #411 (May 1971), Ra's begins to consider Batman a possible heir. Ra's first deduces Batman's secret identity when he reasons the Dark Knight has to be rich, and learns only Bruce Wayne has bought the equipment a crime fighter would have; he is then ready to put Batman to a final test.

Ra's surprises Batman in the Batcave, seemingly to enlist Batman's aid in rescuing both Talia and Dick Grayson, the first Robin, both of whom have apparently been kidnapped. Batman soon discovers the whole affair is a charade orchestrated by Ra's to test Batman, which he passes. Ra's asks Batman to become his heir, which Batman refuses, appalled by his genocidal plan to "cleanse" the world. This story was later adapted into a two-part story in Batman: The Animated Series during its first season under the title "The Demon's Quest".

Despite being mortal enemies, Ra's al Ghul and Batman maintain some level of respect towards one another. Similar to The Riddler, Ra's admires Batman's intellectual prowess first and foremost, regularly referring to Batman as "Detective" or "The Detective" when speaking to or about him. Despite being aware of Batman's true identity as Bruce Wayne since their first meeting, Ra's has never exposed that information to the public or Batman's other foes; Batman once attributed this to Ra's' personal code of honor, though Ra's has repeatedly used that knowledge to his own advantage when fomenting plans and contingencies against Batman.

In the story "Resurrection Night" in Batman #400, Ra's helps all of Batman's foes to escape from Arkham Asylum and the Gotham State Penitentiary, setting them on a plan to abduct certain individuals across Gotham City who are linked in one form or another to Batman. Ra's' true intent is to show Batman the folly of his efforts to protect a corrupt society which, to his mind, allows criminals to exist and flourish. Ra's eventually uses the Pit while still healthy, both increasing his strength and putting his life at risk, in an attempt to outmatch the Dark Knight. The plan backfires, as Ra's is left writhing in the pit, seemingly destroyed.

In Chip Zdarsky's 2022 limited series Batman: The Knight set in the DC Prime Earth (the mainline DC continuity post-Flashpoint) continuity, Ra's, as well as Talia, are rewritten to have first met Bruce prior to him becoming Batman, with Ra's being Bruce's final mentor in his journey to become Batman. Ra's meets Bruce and his companion Minhkhoa Khan, the future vigilante Ghost-Maker, on their travels and tells him that he is trying to save the world like they are, although Bruce quickly turns distrustful of Ra's as he soon finds that Ra's trains assassins. Like his original origin, Ra's christens Bruce as his right hand man, though this time he does so after Bruce defeats Minhkhoa in combat. Ra's later reveals to Bruce his true intentions to use missiles to bomb numerous cities around the world, but Bruce reveals to Ra's that Minhkhoa had already discovered them and told Bruce about them during their fight, which allowed Bruce to destroy the League's arsenal before Ra's could use them to harm innocents. Bruce fights Ra's and defeats him, but Talia intervenes, stabbing Bruce and escaping with her father. Minhkhoa rescues Bruce and leaves him in the desert, after which Bruce travels by plane back to Gotham City, where he eventually becomes Batman.

== Other versions ==
- An alternate universe version of Ra's al Ghul appears in Son of the Demon.
- An alternate universe version of Ra's al Ghul appears in Superman & Batman: Generations. This version forced Batman to aid him in an experiment that would allow a person to gain seemingly permanent immortality from a Lazarus Pit when two souls enter the same Pit, where one perishes while the other becomes immortal at random. After Batman agrees, he and Ra's undergo the process, leading to Ra's dying and Bruce taking over the League of Assassins.
- Ra's Al-Apocalypse, a fusion of Ra's al Ghul and Marvel Comics character Apocalypse, appears in the Amalgam Comics universe.
- Rash Al Paca, a funny animal version of Ra's al Ghul, appears in Captain Carrot and the Final Ark.
- An alternate universe version of Ra's al Ghul appears in Kingdom Come. This version was killed under unspecified circumstances, leading his grandson Ibn al Xu'ffasch to revive him so he can help fight Gog. He later attempts to betray Ibn, who kills Ra's again.
- An alternate universe version of Ra's al Ghul appears in Batman: The Doom That Came to Gotham. This version is a member of a cult that worships the demon Iog-Sotha.
- An alternate universe version of Ra's al Ghul appears in Flashpoint. This version is a child and member of H.I.V.E.
- Ra's al Ghul appears in Batman/Teenage Mutant Ninja Turtles.
- Quietus, a fusion of Ra's al Ghul, Batman, and Signal from the Dark Multiverse, appears in the Dark Nights: Death Metal tie-in Robin King.
- An alternate universe version of Ra's al Ghul appears in series set in the Absolute Universe. Primarily appearing in Absolute Superman, this version is the director of the Lazarus Corporation, a destructive megacorporation that exploits workers in third-world countries, who works with Brainiac to receive extra-terrestrial technology and weapons. Additionally, in the one-shot Absolute Evil, he joins the Justice League. Desiring a son to become his heir, he attempts to force Superman to become his son and join him. However, Superman eventually defeats him and brings him to Pakistan to face justice. After being reformed through Superman's efforts, his daughter Talia tries to restore him through the Lazarus Pit, but he refuses. Ra's is then killed by the reawakened King Shazam.

== In other media ==
=== Television ===
==== Animation ====
- Ra's al Ghul appears in media set in the DC Animated Universe (DCAU), voiced by David Warner.
  - Ra's al Ghul first appears in Batman: The Animated Series. This version has a son named Arcady Duvall (voiced by Malcolm McDowell), who met and battled Jonah Hex in 1883.
  - Ra's al Ghul appears in the Superman: The Animated Series episode "The Demon Reborn". As the Lazarus Pits have begun to lose their effect on him, he plots to siphon Superman's energy with a Native American artifact to rejuvenate himself. He ultimately fails and dies, though his daughter Talia al Ghul revives him and the two escape.
  - Ra's al Ghul appears in the Batman Beyond episode "Out of the Past". Sometime prior to the series, he participated in the Near-Apocalypse of 2009 before he was defeated by Batman and Talia and suffered irreparable injuries, leading him to transfer his mind into Talia's body. In 2039, he manipulates Bruce Wayne into using a Lazarus Pit to restore his own youth before attempting to take over his body and control of Wayne Enterprises. However, he is thwarted by Batman II and killed when the Lazarus Pit explodes.
- Ra's al Ghul appears in Batman: The Brave and the Bold, voiced by Peter Woodward.
- Ra's al Ghul appears in Young Justice, voiced by Oded Fehr. This version is a high-ranking member of the Light before being replaced by Deathstroke.
- Ra's al Ghul appears in Robot Chicken DC Comics Special III: Magical Friendship, voiced by Dee Bradley Baker.
- Ra's al Ghul appears in Beware the Batman, voiced by Lance Reddick.
- Ra's al Ghul appears in the DC Super Hero Girls episode "#LeagueOfShadows", voiced by Sendhil Ramamurthy while Jason C. Miller provides his singing voice. This version is a rock musician who wants to eliminate all evil in the world, starting with bad music.
- Ra's al Ghul appears in Bat-Fam, voiced by Michael Benyaer. This version was turned into a ghost due to magic and now haunts Wayne Manor.

==== Live-action ====
Matt Nable as Ra's al Ghul in Arrow.

- Multiple incarnations of Ra's al Ghul appears in TV series set in the Arrowverse. This version is a lineage of "horsemen" selected to become "Ra's al Ghul", a title passed between the League of Assassins' leaders.
  - The first incarnation of Ra's al Ghul appears in the third season of Arrow, portrayed by Matt Nable. Additionally, a younger version appears in the Legends of Tomorrow episode "Left Behind".
  - The second incarnation of Ra's al Ghul is Malcolm Merlyn, portrayed by John Barrowman. A former horseman of the previous Ra's al Ghul, Malcolm seizes control of the League from the end of the third season until the fourth season of Arrow.
  - Nyssa Raatko briefly assumes the position in the fourth season after Oliver Queen helps her defeat Malcolm until she chooses to disband the League.
- Ra's al Ghul appears in Gotham, portrayed by Alexander Siddig. This version is an ally of the Court of Owls and Jeremiah Valeska and a former lover of and mentor to Barbara Kean.

=== Film ===
Liam Neeson as Ra's al Ghul / Henri Ducard in Batman Begins (2005)

- Ra's al Ghul appears in the Dark Knight trilogy, portrayed by Liam Neeson.
  - First appearing in Batman Begins, this version is based in the Himalayas near Bhutan, employs a decoy (portrayed by Ken Watanabe), goes by the alias "Henri Ducard", and serves as one of Bruce Wayne's mentors.
  - Ra's al Ghul appears in The Dark Knight Rises, with Josh Pence additionally portraying him as a young adult. In flashbacks, he operated as a mercenary for a warlord before falling in love with and secretly marrying the latter's daughter, with whom he has his own daughter, Talia.
- Ra's al Ghul appears in Batman: Under the Red Hood, voiced by Jason Isaacs.
- Ra's al Ghul appears in Son of Batman, voiced by Giancarlo Esposito.
- A demon impersonating Ra's al Ghul appears in Justice League vs. Teen Titans, voiced by Terrence C. Carson.
- Ra's al Ghul appears in Batman vs. Teenage Mutant Ninja Turtles, voiced by Cas Anvar.
- Ra's al Ghul appears in Injustice, voiced by Faran Tahir.
- The Doom That Came to Gotham incarnation of Ra's al Ghul appears in the film adaptation, voiced by Navid Negahban.
- Ra's al Ghul appears in Batman Ninja vs. Yakuza League, voiced by Kazuhiro Yamaji in Japanese and John Swasey in English.

=== Video games ===
- Ra's al Ghul appears in Batman: Dark Tomorrow, voiced by Don Leslie.
- Ra's al Ghul appears in Batman Begins, voiced by Liam Neeson while his decoy is voiced by Fred Tatasciore.
- Ra's al Ghul appears in DC Universe Online.
- Ra's al Ghul appears as a support card in the mobile version of Injustice: Gods Among Us.
- Ra's al Ghul makes a non-speaking cameo appearance in Injustice 2 via Black Adam's ending.
- Ra's al Ghul appears in Gotham Knights, voiced again by Navid Negahban. This version succeeded in mortally wounding Batman during their final fight, but was killed himself when Batman activated the Batcave's self-destruct protocol. Talia al Ghul subsequently takes over the League of Assassins and incinerates her father's body to prevent him from being resurrected.

==== Lego series ====
- Ra's al Ghul appears as an unlockable playable character in Lego Batman: The Video Game.
- Ra's al Ghul appears as a boss and unlockable playable character in Lego Batman 2: DC Super Heroes, voiced by Steve Blum.
- The Batman Begins incarnation of Ra's al Ghul / "Henri Ducard" appears as a playable character in Lego Batman 3: Beyond Gotham via downloadable content.
- Ra's al Ghul appears as a playable character in Lego DC Super-Villains, voiced by JB Blanc.
- Ra's al Ghul appears in Lego Batman: Legacy of the Dark Knight, voiced by Scott Joseph.

==== Batman: Arkham ====
Ra's al Ghul appears in the Batman: Arkham franchise, voiced by Dee Bradley Baker. After being alluded to in Batman: Arkham Asylum, he appears as a boss in Batman: Arkham City and returns in Batman: Arkham Knight via the "Season of Infamy" DLC. Like most incarnations, this version of Ra's is the ancient leader of the League of Assassins who seeks to purge Gotham City of crime. To this end, he manipulates Hugo Strange into establishing the Arkham City super-prison, but after their plan to purge its criminal population is foiled by Batman, Ra's kills Strange and commits suicide. He is later partially revived via a Lazarus Pit as a civil war erupts between the League members loyal to Ra's, and a rebel faction led by his daughter Nyssa; depending on the player's choices, Ra's either regains his strength and kills Nyssa, or is left to die as Nyssa assumes control of the League.

=== Miscellaneous ===
- Ra's al Ghul appears in The Batman Adventures.
- Ra's al Ghul appears in the Young Justice tie-in comic.
- The Arrowverse incarnation of Ra's al Ghul appears in Arrow: Season 2.5.
- Ra's al Ghul appears in Batman '66 Meets Wonder Woman '77.
- Ra's al Ghul appears in the Injustice 2 prequel comic as the leader of the Suicide Squad.

== Collected editions ==
His stories have been collected into a number of volumes:

- Batman: Tales of the Demon (1991), collecting the original 1970s Ra's al Ghul stories by Dennis O'Neil and Neal Adams (Detective Comics #411, #485, #489-490; Batman #232, #235, #240, #242-244; DC Special Series #15)
- Batman: The Demon Trilogy (2020), collecting three original graphic novels:
  - Batman: Son of the Demon (1987), by Mike W. Barr and Jerry Bingham
  - Batman: Bride of the Demon (1990), by Mike W. Barr and Tom Grindberg
  - Batman: Birth of the Demon (1993), by Dennis O'Neil and Norm Breyfogle
- JLA Vol. 7: Tower of Babel (2001), by Mark Waid, Howard Porter, and Steve Scott, in which Ra's goes up against the Justice League of America (JLA #42-46; material from JLA Secret Files #3 & JLA 80-PAGE GIANT #1; ISBN 1-56389-727-X)
- Batman: Death and the Maidens (2004), a 9-issue miniseries by Greg Rucka and Klaus Janson, giving the ultimate death of Ra's al Ghul (ISBN 1-4012-0234-9)
- Year One: Batman – Ra's al Ghul (2005), a 2-issue miniseries by Devin K. Grayson and Paul Gulacy, which takes place a year after Ra's' death in Death And The Maidens
- Batman: The Resurrection of Ra's Al Ghul (2008) by Grant Morrison, Peter Milligan, Fabian Nicieza, and Paul Dini, chronicles Ra's al Ghul's resurrection (Batman #670-671; Detective Comics #838-839; Nightwing #138-139; Robin #168-169; Batman Annual #26; Robin Annual #7).
- Batman Arkham: Ra's al Ghul (2019) by various, an anthology of stories featuring Ra's al Ghul from throughout the DC Universe (Batman #232, #243-244; DC Special Series #15; The Brave and the Bold #159; Detective Comics #750; Batman Annual #26; Nightwing #152; Batman and Robin #23.3).

== See also ==
- List of Batman family enemies
- Algol – The name Algol derives from the Arabic رأس الغول ra's al-ghūl. The English name "Demon's Head" is a direct translation of this, as Ra's is head, Ghoul is Demon.
- Eurasian nomads
- Alexander the Great
- Fu Manchu
- Secret society
- Terrorism
- Eternal youth
- Mandarin
