= Leslie Hendrix =

American actress (born 1959/1960)

- Born: 1959/1960 (age 66–67)
- Occupation: Actress
- Years active: 1992–present

Leslie Hendrix (born 1959/1960) is an American actress. She is best known for playing the role of medical examiner Elizabeth Rodgers on four Law & Order series (Law & Order, Law & Order: Special Victims Unit, Law & Order: Criminal Intent and Law & Order: Trial by Jury). She also played Judge Hannah Lampert on the soap opera All My Children. In the third season of Gotham she plays Kathryn Monroe, the mysterious leader of the Court of Owls.

== Stage ==
In 1992, the same year Hendrix started her screen career with her first of 264 appearances in the Law & Order franchise, she also made her Broadway debut, in A Streetcar Named Desire. She was the understudy for the Blanche DuBois role when star Jessica Lange became sick after the first act of a performance. Hendrix had 11 minutes to have makeup applied and don the costume and wig. Her other Broadway credits include Indiscretions (1995), The Music Man (2000), Hollywood Arms (2002), and Airline Highway (2015).

== Filmography ==
=== Film ===
Year	Title	Role	Notes
1998	Went to Coney Island on a Mission from God... Be Back by Five	The Bearded Lady	
2002	Sweet Home Alabama	Reporter	
2009	Made for Each Other	Mrs. Jacobs	
2010	Not Interested	Ms. Samuels	Video short
2011	Arthur	Alice Johnson	
2013	Stain Removal	Constance	Short film
2014	Lyra	Lyra's Mom	Short film
2018	Carnivore	Christine	Short film
2019	Benim	Mother	Short film
2019	About a Teacher	Ms. Murry	

=== Television ===
Year	Title	Role	Notes
1992–2010	Law & Order	Dr. Elizabeth Rodgers	Recurring role (seasons 2–20)
1998	Exiled: A Law & Order Movie	Dr. Elizabeth Rodgers	TV film
1999–2000	Law & Order: Special Victims Unit	Dr. Elizabeth Rodgers	Recurring role (season 1)
2001–2011	Law & Order: Criminal Intent	Dr. Elizabeth Rodgers	Recurring role (seasons 1–10)
2002	Third Watch	Anne McCambly	Episode: "Thicker Than Water"
2004	All My Children	Judge Hannah Lampert	Recurring role
2005	Law & Order: Trial by Jury	Dr. Elizabeth Rodgers	Episode: "Baby Boom"
2009, 2010	The Good Wife	Virginia Sun	2 episodes
2011	Onion News Network	Grace North	Episode: "Fifth Anniversary"
2012	Community	Dr. Elizabeth Rodgers	Episode: "Basic Lupine Urology"
2014	Blue Bloods	Mrs. Judith Wilson	Episode: "Loose Lips"
2014	Elementary	Cynthia Kerr	Episode: "Rip Off"
2014	The Mysteries of Laura	Trish	Episode: "The Mystery of the Fertility Fatality"
2015	Madam Secretary	Atty. Gen. Louise Cronenberg	Episode: "The Show Must Go On"
2016	Divorce	Carolyn	Episode: "Christmas"
2016	The Blacklist	Shirley Lehman	Episode: "Mr. Solomon (No. 32)"
2016–2017	Gotham	Kathryn Monroe	Recurring role (season 3)
2018	Instinct	Maggie Stock	Episode: "Go Figure"
2019	Living with Yourself	Doctor	Episode: "Va Bene"
2020	Power Book II: Ghost	Caroline Cooper Saxe	Episode: "The Stranger"
