= Sensei (DC Comics) =

Fictional super-villain and martial arts master

The Sensei
- The Sensei, as he appeared in Justice League of America #94 (November 1971). Art by Neal Adams.

Publication information
- Publisher: DC Comics
- First appearance: Strange Adventures #215 (December 1968)
- Created by: Neal Adams

In-story information
- Alter ego: Unknown
- Species: Human
- Team affiliations: League of Assassins
- Abilities: Master martial artist

The Sensei (Japanese: 先生) is a supervillain appearing in American comic books published by DC Comics. The Sensei was created by writer-artist Neal Adams and first appeared in Strange Adventures #215 (December 1968). The character is a martial arts sensei and adversary of the superhero Batman, along with Deadman and several other heroes.

In one continuity, Sensei is the father of Ra's al Ghul, paternal grandfather of Talia al Ghul, and maternal great-grandfather of Damian Wayne.

The character appeared on the third season of Gotham, played by Raymond J. Barry.

== Fictional biography ==
The Sensei is a Chinese martial arts master who first appeared as the leader of the Society of Assassins, before the introduction of Ra's al Ghul.

Ra's later appointed Ebenezer Darrk as president of the assassins (renamed the League of Assassins) with the Sensei as his lieutenant. After Darrk's death in a conflict against Batman, the Sensei rebelled against Ra's for the leadership. For a time, the Sensei was possessed by the spirit called Jonah, who in Sensei's body was responsible for the murder of Boston Brand, who became Deadman after his death. After a struggle with Deadman and Rama Kushna, Jonah was destroyed and Sensei regained control of his body.

By this stage, the Sensei was clearly insane (if he had not been before) with no goals other than to raise assassination to an art form. Among other crimes he used Bronze Tiger, the brainwashed partner of Richard Dragon, to carry out a number of assassinations. Most notably he used the Bronze Tiger to occupy Batman in battle, while other assassins killed Batman's friend Kathy Kane.

The Sensei. Art by Tony Daniel.

He next attempted to kill a number of dignitaries by having the League plant explosives along a fault line, stating that using a force of nature to carry out an assassination would be his greatest work of art. Although Batman arrived in time to rescue the delegates, he was unable to stop the earthquake. With no time to pursue Sensei, Batman was forced to allow Ra's al Ghul to go after the assassin. Sensei then engaged himself in a fight to the death with Ra's, during which both of them were swallowed by the earthquake. Ra's survived thanks to his rejuvenating Lazarus Pit.

The Sensei also somehow survived, to reappear in The Resurrection of Ra's al Ghul storyline, wherein he is revealed to be Ra's al Ghul's father. When Ra's and Batman seek the Fountain of Youth in Nanda Parbat, Sensei confronts them both, stabbing Ra's' decaying body and then attacking Batman, arrogantly informing the Dark Knight that, while he can only maintain the necessary physical strength to vanquish Batman for two minutes at his age, he only needs one minute to break him. However, Batman is able to take him by surprise, hurling both of them into the Fountain. It destroys Sensei due to his impure spirit, but Batman is not only healed, but apparently slightly rejuvenated by his dip in the waters.

== Powers and abilities ==
The Sensei is an expert martial artist. His longevity allowed him to learn dozens of martial arts over the centuries, able to beat Batman within minutes, although his age meant that he was unable to physically confront the Dark Knight for long enough to do so.

== Other versions ==
The Sensei appears in Batman: Odyssey. This version is Ra's al Ghul's son.

== In other media ==
=== Television ===
- The Sensei appears in Young Justice, voiced by Keone Young. This version is an ally of the Light who is unrelated to Ra's al Ghul. Later in the series, he leaves the League alongside Ra's and Talia.
- The Sensei appears in Gotham, portrayed by Raymond J. Barry. This version, also known as the Temple Shaman, works for Ra's al Ghul to oversee the Court of Owls' activities and train the young Bruce Wayne. He is eventually killed by Alfred Pennyworth while attempting to make Bruce detonate a virus bomb.

=== Video games ===
- The Sensei appears in DC Universe Online, voiced by Robert Dieke.
- The Sensei appears as a character summon in Scribblenauts Unmasked: A DC Comics Adventure.

=== Miscellaneous ===
The Sensei as depicted in Batman: Gotham Adventures #9 (February 1999). Art by Rick Burchett.

- The Sensei appears in Batman: Gotham Adventures.
- The Sensei appears in the Young Justice tie-in comic.
