= Raymond J. Barry =

American film, television and stage actor (born 1939)

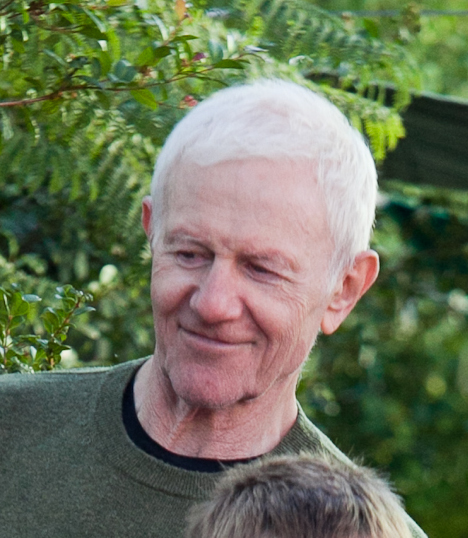
- Raymond J. Barry in 2011
- Born: Raymond John Barry; March 14, 1939 (age 87); Hempstead, New York, U.S.
- Education: Brown University (BA); Yale University (MFA)
- Occupation: Actor
- Years active: 1970–present
- Spouse: Robyn Mundell
- Children: 4
- Website: raymondjbarry.org

Raymond John Barry (born March 14, 1939) is an American film, television, and stage actor. He was nominated for the Independent Spirit Award for Best Supporting Male for his performance in the film Steel City.

== Personal life ==
Raymond John Barry was born in Hempstead, New York. He is married to writer Robyn Mundell. Together they have four children, Oona, Raymond, Liam and Manon.

His father, Raymond Barry, worked in sales. His mother, Barbara Constance Barry (née Duffy), was also an actor, known professionally as B. Constance Barry (April 29, 1913 – October 22, 2006). Her final role in 2001, was in the film L.I.E. Barry's mother was of Canadian, Irish, and Swedish descent, and Barry's paternal grandparents were from Ireland.

A three-letter athlete at Lynbrook High School in Lynbrook, New York, Barry graduated from Brown University in 1962. While there, he earned his degree in Philosophy. Afterwards, he completed the Yale Drama School.

== Career ==
Before appearing in films he appeared in more than 75 plays. Barry is known for his roles in the film Interview with the Assassin, portraying Walter Ohlinger, a man who claimed to be the second shooter on the Grassy Knoll in the assassination of John F. Kennedy, and as Ron Kovic's father in the Academy Award-winning film Born on the Fourth of July. Barry also played Pa Cox, known for his character's continuous quote, "The wrong kid died!" in Walk Hard: The Dewey Cox Story.

Other films in which he appeared include: Dead Man Walking, Cool Runnings, K2, The Tulse Luper Suitcases, Falling Down, and Training Day.

On television, he has appeared as Jack Shephard's grandfather in Lost, as Fox Mulder's congressional patron, Senator Richard Matheson, in The X-Files, and as Lilly Rush's father in CBS series Cold Case. He had a recurring role on Justified as Arlo Givens, the father of main character Raylan Givens.

Barry appeared in two films focusing on the death penalty, Dead Man Walking and The Chamber, both with actor Robert Prosky.

== Films ==
Year	Title	Role	Notes
1977	Sur Faces		
1977	Between the Lines	Herbert Fisk	
1977	The Goodbye Girl	Richard III Cast	
1978	An Unmarried Woman	Edward Thoreaux	
1980	Christmas Evil	Detective Gleason	
1985	Insignificance	Ballplayer's Father	
1985	Year of the Dragon	Louis Bukowski	
1986	Slow Burn	Gerald McMurty	
1986	Out of Bounds	Hurley	
1986	Playing for Keeps	Mr. Hatcher, Chloe's Father	
1987	Three for the Road	Senator Kitteredge	
1988	Cop	Captain Fred Gaffney	
1988	Daddy's Boys	Daddy	
1989	Born on the Fourth of July	Mr. Kovic	
1991	December Bride	Petey	
1991	Nothing but Trouble	Mark	
1991	K2	Phillip Claiborne	
1992	The Turning	Mark Harnish	
1992	Rapid Fire	FBI Agent Frank Stewart	
1993	Falling Down	Captain Bill Yardley	
1993	Cool Runnings	Kurt Hemphill	
1994	The Ref	Lieutenant Huff	
1995	Sudden Death	US Vice President Daniel Binder	
1995	Dead Man Walking	Earl Delacroix	
1995	Headless Body in Topless Bar	The Man	
1996	The Chamber	Rollie Wedge / Donnie Cayhall	
1997	Best Men	Agent Hoover	
1997	Mad City	FBI Special Agent Dobbins	
1997	Flubber	Chester Hoenicker	
1998	Return to Paradise	Sheriff's Father	uncredited
2001	Recoil		uncredited
2001	The Deep End	Carlie Nagel	
2001	Training Day	Captain Lou Jacobs	
2001	New Port South	Edwards	
2002	Interview with the Assassin	Walter Ohlinger	
2003	Just Married	Mr. Leezak	
2003	The Tulse Luper Suitcases, Part 1: The Moab Story	Stephen Figura	
2003	The Tulse Luper Suitcases: Antwerp	Stephen Figura	
2004	The Tulse Luper Suitcases, Part 2: Vaux to the Sea	Stephen Figura	
2006	Steel City	Vic Lee	
2006	Slumberland	Harry	
2006	Little Children	Bob "Bullhorn Bob"	
2007	Flight of the Living Dead: Outbreak on a Plane	Captain Banyon	
2007	The Death and Life of Bobby Z	Stanley	
2007	Walk Hard: The Dewey Cox Story	Pa Cox	
2008	Seducing Spirits	Dr. Joel Sheinbaum	
2008	The Dot Man	General Boyt	
2008	American Crude	Mr. Grand	
2008	Hotel California	Dmitri Debartolla	
2009	Set Apart	Will Lantis	
2012	Charlie Valentine	Charlie Valentine	
2012	The Order		uncredited
2012	The Shortcut	Ivor Hartley	
2012	The Yellow Wallpaper	Dr. Jack Everland	
2014	3 Days to Kill	CIA Director	
2016	The Purge: Election Year	Caleb Warrens	
2016	Brave New Jersey	Captain Ambrose P. Collins	
2018	Desolation	Father Bill	
2024	Filthy Animals	Lester	

== Television ==
Year	Title	Role	Episode	Notes
1974	Upstairs, Downstairs	Mr. Lyon's Friend	"The Sudden Storm"	
1978	Daddy, I Don't Like It Like This	Tony		TV movie
1983	The Face of Rage			TV movie
1985	Scarecrow and Mrs. King	Captain Ted Ronson	"J. Edgar's Ghost"	
1987	It's a Living	Gangster	"Ginger's Baby"	
1987–1988	The Oldest Rookie	Lieutenant Marco Zaga	Main cast	
1990	Drug Wars: The Camarena Story	Jack Lawn	Main cast	Miniseries
1992	Tales from the Crypt	Joe Garrett	"King of the Road"	
1992	L.A. Law		"Love on the Rox"	
1992	Two-Fisted Tales	Garrett	Segment: "King of the Road"	TV Movie
1993	Between Love and Hate	Charles Templeton		TV movie
1993	Fugitive Nights: Danger in the Desert	Jack Graves		TV movie
1994	Frasier		"You Can't Tell a Crook by His Cover"	
1994	Melrose Place	Vince Connors	"No Strings Attached"	
1994	Hyperion Bay	Frank Sweeney	"The Rope"	
1994–1999	The X-Files	Senator Richard Matheson	3 episodes	
1998	Four Corners	Sam Haskell		
1999	Wasteland		2 episodes	
2002	UC: Undercover	Nathan Dubinsky	"Teddy C"	
2002	CSI: Crime Scene Investigation	Dr. Phillip Gerard	"The Accused is Entitled"	
2002	Push, Nevada	D'Wight Sloman / Dwight Sloman	"The Letter of the Law"	
2003	Dragnet	Sergeant Gil Thorn	"The Little Guy"	
2004	Alias	Senator George Reed	2 episodes	
2005	Crossing Jordan	Mr. Nicholas	"Luck Be a Lady"	
2005	Law & Order	Robert Dolan	"Ghosts"	
2006	Mystery Woman: Redemption	Reverend Tucker		TV movie
2008	Welcome to The Captain	The General	2 episodes	
2008–2009	Cold Case	Paul Cooper	6 episodes	
2008–2009	The Cleaner	Bill Banks	2 episodes	
2009	Lost	Ray Shephard	"316"	
2010	Law & Order: Special Victims Unit	Travis Hankett	"Wannabe"	
2010	NCIS: Los Angeles	Branston Cole / Bernstrom Kohl	2 episodes	
2010	The Will: Family Secrets Revealed	Joey Bishop	"The Estate of Joey Bishop"	
2010–2015	Justified	Arlo Givens	Recurring role (seasons 1–4, 6)	
2011	Law & Order: Criminal Intent	Johnny Eames	"The Last Street in Manhattan"	
2011	CSI: Crime Scene Investigation	Arvin Thorpe	3 episodes	
2012	New Girl	Older Nick	"Katie"	
2013	Axe Cop	Bad Santa	"Birthday Month"	
2013	Grey's Anatomy	Gene Steers	"Puttin' on the Ritz"	
2014–2015	The 100	Dante Wallace	Recurring role (season 2)	
2016	Ray Donovan	Dmitri Sokolov	2 episodes	
2017	Feud: Bette and Joan	Hal LeSueur	"Hagsploitation"	
2017	Gotham	The Shaman / Sensei	Recurring role (season 3)	
2017	Training Day	Captain Lou Jacobs	"Elegy"	reprised his role from the 2001 film
2017	You're the Worst	Burt	"It's Been: Part 1"	
2017	The Gifted	Otto Strucker	"threat of eXtinction"	
2018	Shooter	August Russo	3 episodes	
2019	13 Reasons Why	Harrison Chatham	Recurring role (season 3)	
2022	Snowfall	Old Man James	2 episodes	

== Theatre ==
Off Broadway

Year	Title	Role	Theatre
1970	Terminal	The Open Theater Ensemble	Washington Square Methodist Church
1970	The Serpent: A Ceremony	The Open Theater Ensemble	Washington Square Methodist Church
1974	The Last Days of British Honduras	The Amerind	Joseph Papp Public Theater
1975	Fishing	Rory	Joseph Papp Public Theater
1976	Woyzeck	Drum Major / Grandmother / Cop	Joseph Papp Public Theater
1977	Happy End	Baby Face	Theatre Four
1977	Landscape of the Body	Masked Man / Dope King / Bank Teller	Joseph Papp Public Theater
1978	Curse of the Starving Class	Slater	Joseph Papp Public Theater
1981	Penguin Touquet	Dangerous Man	Joseph Papp Public Theater
1981	Hunting Scenes from Bavaria	Volker	Stage 73
1983	Egyptology: My Head was a Sledgehammer		Joseph Papp Public Theater

Broadway

Year	Title	Role	Theatre
1975	The Leaf People	Gitaucho (Meesho)	Booth Theatre
1977	Happy End	Volker	Martin Beck Theatre
1979	Zoot Suit	Sergeant Smith / Bailiff / Sailor	Winter Garden Theatre
