= Smile Like You Mean It (Gotham) =

- Gotham episode
- Episode no.: Season 3 Episode 13
- Directed by: Olatunde Osunsanmi
- Written by: Steven Lilien & Bryan Wynbrandt
- Cinematography by: Crescenzo Notarile
- Editing by: Leland Sexton
- Production code: T13.19913
- Original air date: January 23, 2017
- Running time: 42 minutes

Guest appearances
- Cameron Monaghan as Jerome Valeska; Ivana Miličević as Maria Kyle; David Dastmalchian as Dwight Pollard; PJ Marshall as Cole Clemons; James Andrew O'Connor as Tommy Bones; James Mount as Andrew Dove

Episode chronology
← Previous "Ghosts"	Next → "The Gentle Art of Making Enemies"
- Gotham season 3

"Smile Like You Mean It" (also known as "Mad City: Smile Like You Mean It") is the thirteenth episode of the third season, and 57th episode overall from the Fox series Gotham. The episode was written by Steven Lilien & Bryan Wynbrandt and directed by Olatunde Osunsanmi. It was first broadcast on January 23, 2017. In the episode, Dwight Pollard makes one last attempt to resurrect Jerome Valeska and decides to just cut off his face and act as his incarnation while the real Jerome is revealed to be resurrected and bent on revenge. Gordon and Harvey Bullock attempt to stop the cult from broadcasting a message of anarchy across the city while Oswald Cobblepot discovers that everyone is turning against him after the interview. Meanwhile, Bruce Wayne and Selina Kyle discover the real reason Maria came back to her.

The episode received critical acclaim, with significant praise towards the return of Jerome, Cameron Monaghan's performance and the final scene, citing it as one of the best episodes of the series.

== Plot ==
Dwight (David Dastmalchian) and members of the cult enter a warehouse with the help of a co-worker and retrieve Jerome's (Cameron Monaghan) corpse. The GCPD investigates the break-in and Gordon (Ben McKenzie) and Bullock (Donal Logue) find that the warehouse belongs to Wayne Enterprises, which retrieved the corpses from Indian Hill and deduce that the woman in the morgue was a resurrection test. They then find an injured cult member in the warehouse and arrest him.

Cole (PJ Marshall) arrives at Wayne Manor and tells Bruce (David Mazouz) that the payment for Maria's (Ivana Miličević) debt is $200,000 and if he does not pay it, he will make sure she goes to jail. Despite Selina's (Camren Bicondova) insistence not to give the money, Bruce gives the money to Maria. In the GCPD, Gordon interrogates the cultist and finds that Jerome's cryrogenic pod was stolen and discovers that they're planning to resurrect him. Meanwhile, Dwight and another cultist begin a process to bring Jerome's corpse back to life.

After Cobblepot's (Robin Lord Taylor) disastrous interview along with the missing whereabouts of his staff, the people question his authority and demand his resignation. Barbara (Erin Richards) also informs him that Tommy Bones (James Andrew O'Connor) is questioning his leadership and turned against him and tells him to prepare for a meeting she'll arrange with the heads of the mob. Fox (Chris Chalk) tells Gordon and Bullock that because of the energy used to revive the girl in the morgue, that would cause a power surge in the electric grid and suspect a power plant to be the center of the resurrections. They decide to go raid the place but one of the cultists is revealed to be working in the GCPD and informs Dwight of the raid. Dwight fails to revive Jerome and upon being reminded by his assistant that the cultists were promised by Dwight that they'd see Jerome's smiling face again, Dwight kills the assistant in frustration, cuts off Jerome's face from the corpse and flees before the police arrive, leaving the corpse behind.

Dwight appears at the cult's meeting, wearing Jerome's face and convinces the others that they are "all Jerome". At the Sirens, Cobblepot confronts Barbara, suspecting her of conspiring against him when he is called by Tommy Bones (James Andrew O'Connor), who claims that they will end their partnership and says he has Nygma (Cory Michael Smith) captive. After Cobblepot leaves to gather his henchmen, Tommy is revealed to be threatened by Tabitha (Jessica Lucas), who then kills him. Gordon and Bullock interrogate the mole but fail to convince him until Lee (Morena Baccarin) doses him with a truth serum and Dove reveals that Dwight and the cultists are planning on broadcasting a message at a TV station. Lee returns to her office where Jerome is revealed to be resurrected and takes her prisoner.

Maria and Cole are revealed to be working together in a scam to get Bruce's money when they're discovered by Selina, who leaves, angry that Maria used her. Selina then confronts Bruce about it, who reveals that he suspected it to be a scam all along, but decided to pay anyway, hoping it might lead to a reconciliation between Selina and Maria. Selina is mad that Maria never made an effort to reconnect until Bruce came into her life, and tries to take it out on him, but Bruce's training is starting to bear fruit, and he prevents her from doing any damage. Dwight and the cultists invade the station and take over the news broadcast with Dwight acting as Jerome while Gordon and the police enter through the ventilation system to save a hostage. Jerome sees the broadcast and leaves the precinct in uniform, leaving Lee bound and gagged. Gordon, Bullock and the GCPD invade the station just as Dwight broadcasts the message, killing many cultists and arresting Dwight. Meanwhile, Cobblepot receives a call from Nygma, who says that he is held captive at Kane Chemicals.

Jerome steals a station van and kidnaps Dwight. Jerome takes him to a power plant, where he stapled his face back on and has Dwight strapped with explosives. He then broadcasts a live message, telling the people that "in the darkness, there are no rules" and encourages everyone to kill anyone and do whatever they want, as in the morning, they will be "reborn". He then ignites the explosives and leaves Dwight behind with the explosives to die. Gordon demands a chopper to make it in time for the plant but as he goes outside, he sees the power plant explode and the city suffers a wide power outage, leaving it in darkness.

== Production ==
=== Development ===
In January 2017, it was announced that the thirteenth episode of the season will be titled "Smile Like You Mean It" and was to be written by Steven Lilien & Bryan Wynbrandt and directed by Olatunde Osunsanmi.

=== Writing ===
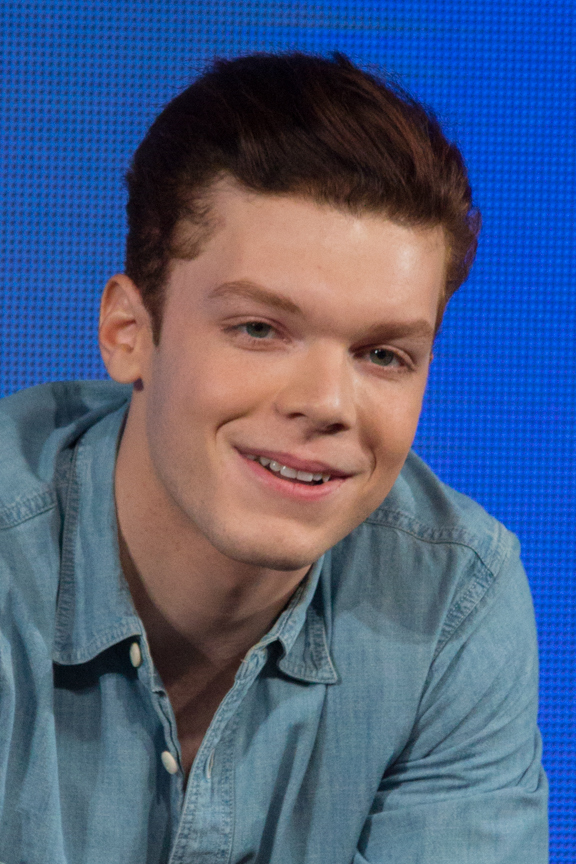
The episode marks Cameron Monaghan's return to the series.

The early talks to bring Jerome back to the show resurfaced when the show killed the character in The Last Laugh. According to executive producer John Stephens, he explained: "If you watch the episodes closely, as they go forward this year you'll start seeing the seeds of the way that story will continue to develop. And we probably have not seen the last of that fellow." Throughout the second and third season, Cameron Monaghan teased the return of the character and finally in August 2016, Stephens confirmed the character's return, citing that it was their intention to bring him back and "You'll have these underground movements that have started to talk about Jerome and what he represented and how he's going to come back like in the days of John the Baptist" and "he plays into the idea of transformation. When he comes back, you want to see that new version. That next step forward." Monaghan also explained that after the death of Jerome in the second season, the producers were liking the idea and planned on bringing him back in the third season but the original idea included Hugo Strange or the Dollmaker involved in his resurrection.

=== Makeup ===
Mike Maddi, the make-up special effects designer, worked on the design for Jerome's face. The face made a resemblance to the famous Joker's story arc, Death of the Family. Monaghan explained that the process of Jerome's new face was "gruesome." The producers made four prosthetic pieces with each of them taking over three hours to apply and another hour to take it off. Monaghan called the process "exhausted" but he also noted that "adds a level of disconnect from the self, from my own image and body, that I thought was really freeing and exciting."

=== Casting ===
Maggie Geha, Benedict Samuel, Drew Powell and Michael Chiklis don't appear in the episode as their respective characters while Cory Michael Smith only appears through voice recording. In January 2017, it was announced that the guest cast for the episode would include Ivana Milicevic as Maria Kyle, Cameron Monaghan as Jerome Valeska, David Dastmalchian as Dwight Pollard, PJ Marshall as Cole Clemons, James Andrew O'Connor as Tommy Bones, and James Mount as Officer Andrew Dove.

== Reception ==
=== Viewers ===
The episode was watched by 3.60 million viewers with a 1.2/4 share among adults aged 18 to 49. This was a 3% decrease in viewership from the previous episode, which was watched by 3.69 million viewers with a 1.2/4 in the 18-49 demographics. With this rating, Gotham ranked second for FOX, behind Lucifer, third on its timeslot and eight for the night behind Lucifer, Scorpion, a rerun of The Big Bang Theory, Man with a Plan, 2 Broke Girls, Kevin Can Wait, and The Bachelor.

The episode ranked as the 58th most watched show of the week and the 25th most watched show of the week in the 18-49 demographics. With Live+7 DVR viewing factored in, the episode had an overall rating of 1.8 in the 18–49 demographic.

=== Critical reviews ===
Professional ratings
Review scores
Source	Rating
Rotten Tomatoes (Tomatometer)	100%
Rotten Tomatoes (Average Score)	9.5
IGN	8.0
TV Fanatic	5.0/5.0 stars
TV Overmind	4.0/5.0 stars

"Mad City: Smile Like You Mean It" received enormous praise from critics. The episode received a rating of 100% with an average score of 9.5 out of 10 on the review aggregator Rotten Tomatoes.

Matt Fowler of IGN gave the episode a "great" 8.0 out of 10 and wrote in his verdict, "'Smile Like You Mean It' brought Jerome back in a fun (and fairly icky) way. He could have woken right up and led his crazy cult into the city for a carnival of violence, but instead he had his face stolen! And before he could do anything (like kill Bruce Wayne), he had to go get his freakin' face! That felt pretty inspired, actually. Not only did his sewn-back-on face give him traces of the movie Jokers, but the entire thing bumped shoulders with the New 52 rebirth of Joker."

Nick Hogan of TV Overmind gave the series a 4 star rating out of 5, writing "Overall, I really enjoyed the episode and the crazy, psychological turn that Gotham has taken. 2017 in Gotham City is shaping up to be absolutely bonkers, and I love it!" Sage Young of EW gave the episode an "A−" and wrote, "The night of 'the awakening' is messier than second-rate anarchist Dwight Pollard hoped, but the deed is still done. After months of anticipation on the part of fans and teasing on the part of Fox, Jerome Valeska is breathing again. And if he's breathing, you better believe he's causing trouble."

Lisa Babick from TV Fanatic, gave a perfect 5 star rating out of 5, stating: "Gotham strung us along for a while before we got to see what we've been so patiently waiting for, but it was well worth the wait." Vinnie Mancuso of New York Observer wrote, "'Smile Like You Mean It' in honor of the recent Presidential Inauguration, was completely stolen by David Mazouz, Camren Bicondova and returning guest star Cameron Monaghan."

Karmen Fox of The Baltimore Sun wrote, "'Mad City: Smile Like You Mean It' was one of the best Gotham episodes aired recently. Sure, the bringing back villains from the dead trope has been played out more than Jerome's laugh track, but this is a bad guy Gotham — the city and the show — has eagerly waiting for." Sydney Bucksbaum of Nerdist wrote, "If his psychopathic attitude and general insanity didn't scare you before, now his outsides match his insides, making Jerome 2.0 a true force to be reckoned with. This is the moment we've all been waiting for, y'all!"

Robert Yanis, Jr. of Screenrant wrote, "It was a payoff that Gotham had long been hinting at... Now, after delving so heavily into reanimation last season, the show is ready to bring back arguably one of its best villains in the flesh." Kayti Burt of Den of Geek gave the episode a perfect 5 star rating out of 5 and wrote, "Tonight's episode of Gotham reminded me how enjoyable this show can be when its respective storylines stick to what they're good at. 'Smile Like You Mean It' saw a disturbingly stellar return of Jerome, while also effectively balancing some smaller, plot-progressing "B" stories. It did this by letting each story line do what it was best at and ending with one hell of a cliffhanger. All in all, 'Smile Like You Mean It' was one of the best episodes we've had in a while. As always, the presence of Cameron Monaghan as Jerome/the Joker automatically ups the episode of roughly 75%. Monaghan brings a frightening, vulnerable unpredictability to the character, while also delivering some lines that made me laugh out loud. On Gotham, Monaghan manages to make a mark in the long, rich legacy of this iconic character, and that's endlessly impressive to watch."
