= Batman: Death of the Family =

DC Comics story arc (2012–2013)

- Promotional image for "Death of the Family"
- Publisher: DC Comics
- Publication date: October 2012 – February 2013
- Genre: Superhero
Title(s)
Batman (vol. 2) #13-17
Batgirl #13-16
Batman and Robin #15-16
Catwoman #13-14
Detective Comics (vol. 2) #15-16
Nightwing #15-16
Red Hood and the Outlaws #15-17
Suicide Squad #14-15
Teen Titans #15-16
- Main character(s): Batman, Nightwing, Batgirl, Robin, Red Robin, Red Hood, Catwoman, Alfred Pennyworth, James Gordon, Joker

Creative team
- Writer(s): Scott Snyder, Adam Glass, Kyle Higgins, John Layman, Scott Lobdell, Ann Nocenti, Gail Simone, Peter Tomasi, James Tynion IV
- Artist(s): Greg Capullo, Eddy Barrows, Ed Benes, Brett Booth, Fernando Dagnino, Jason Fabok, Patrick Gleason, Jock, Timothy Green, Rafa Sandoval

"Batman: Death of the Family" is a 23-issue comic book story arc first published by the comic book publishing company DC Comics in 2012 featuring the fictional superhero Batman and his family of supporting characters. The eponymous, central story arc within the Batman title, was written by Scott Snyder with art by Greg Capullo. The arc also spans several tie-in issues within titles featuring characters of the Batman family including: Batman, Batgirl, Batman and Robin, Catwoman, Detective Comics, Nightwing, Red Hood and the Outlaws, Suicide Squad, and Teen Titans. The story involves the return of Batman's archenemy, the Joker, and his plan to destroy all of the people Batman has come to rely on over the years: the multiple Robins, Batgirl, Catwoman, Alfred Pennyworth, and Commissioner James Gordon. The title is a reference to the classic Batman story arc "A Death in the Family" (1988), in which the Joker murders Jason Todd.

== Synopsis ==
=== Lead-up ===
Following DC Comics' 2011 relaunch of several of its comic series for The New 52, Detective Comics #1 (November 2011) sees the Joker captured by Batman and sent to Arkham Asylum; unbeknownst to Batman, this is part of the Joker's plan to meet with the villain Dollmaker, who surgically removes Joker's face at his request and then pins it to Joker's cell wall as a sign of his rebirth. Joker then escapes and remains unseen in DC Comics for approximately one year, making a shrouded appearance in Detective Comics #12 (October 2012), overlooking the Gotham City Police Department (GCPD) building. The story also references events depicted in several Joker-related stories including Batman: The Killing Joke, Batman: The Man Who Laughs and Batman: A Death in the Family.

=== Main plot ===
Batman

Joker marks his return to Gotham City by attacking the GCPD and recovering his preserved face, killing 19 police officers in the process. He later televises a warning, via the son of his first recorded victim, that Mayor Hady will die that night, referencing another of his earliest crimes. However, the police assigned to protect Hady are killed by a combination of chemicals while Hady survives. Batman analyzes the chemical compound and finds three inert ingredients whose initials spell A.C.E., leading him to the ACE Chemical plant where Joker was originally disfigured. He encounters a person dressed as the Red Hood, one of Joker's aliases, and is struck by an oversized mallet that pushes him into an empty chemical vat; the Hood, revealed to be Harley Quinn, warns Batman that Joker is not the same. Batman manages to escape the vat before it can fill with chemicals. Elsewhere, the Joker attacks Alfred Pennyworth. Each issue of Batman also contained a short backup story; in Batman #13, this story sees Joker preparing Harley to meet Batman in the chemical plant.

After Batman returns home and learns of Alfred's kidnapping, a clue leads him to believe Commissioner James Gordon is Joker's next target. Batman saves Gordon after Joker poisons him with a powerful blood thinner. He then goes to the Gotham Reservoir, the first place he faced off against the Joker. The villain reveals that he has already reenacted his earlier crime, killing several people and blowing up the reservoir, injuring Nightwing. Joker immobilizes Batman, and states his plan to kill each of Batman's allies, believing they have made Batman weak; Joker claims to know their true identities. In the backup story, Joker invites Penguin to an event he has orchestrated at Arkham Asylum.

Batman frees himself and attacks Joker, but is paralyzed by Joker venom, allowing Joker to escape. Batman is recovered by the Bat-Family and taken to the Batcave, where he confesses that after an early battle with Joker, he discovered a joker playing card in the Batcave; he dismisses the idea that Joker has found the cave, but the family fears that Joker knows their identities and blame Batman for concealing such a possibility. Later, Batman interrogates an Arkham guard, who admits that Joker is waiting for him at the asylum. As he ventures into the asylum, his internal dialogue reveals that the movements he had previously seen in Joker's eyes when they met indicated love. In the backup story, Joker is shown to have taken over the asylum and meeting with the institutionalized Riddler.

In Batman #16, Batman encounters Mr. Freeze, Scarecrow and Clayface. Batman finds Joker with Two-Face, Riddler and Penguin, but before he can stop them, Joker shows him video of Nightwing, Robin, Red Hood, Batgirl, and Red Robin. Joker orders Batman to take his place on his "throne" – an electric chair – to spare their lives. Batman does so, receiving an electric shock. In the backup story, Two-Face demands to be included in Batman's death, but Joker traps him behind bars alongside Penguin and Riddler.

In Batman #17, Joker hosts a mock dinner in the caves leading to the Batcave. Batman and his allies have been bound and doused in gasoline, with Joker warning against escaping at the risk of agitating the flint in the cave; everyone in the Bat-Family save for Batman have also been bandaged. A brainwashed Alfred serves them with a cloche seemingly containing their own severed faces. When Joker threatens to ignite the gasoline, Batman escapes and triggers a blaze, but uses an explosive and his knowledge of the cave system to blow its roof open, allowing water to rush in from above and douse the flames. When he frees the others and they take their bandages off, it is revealed that they still have their faces.

Batman pursues Joker to the edge of a large drop. Batman claims that he knows Joker's true identity. As Batman threatens to whisper it in his ear, Joker jumps over the edge and falls out of sight, his face separated from him. Batman finds a notebook which Joker claimed held the secret identities of the Bat-Family, but discovers it is blank. Meanwhile, the Bat-Family are gassed into attacking each other, but manage to fight off the gas' influence. Later, in Wayne Manor, Batman tells a recovering Alfred that after finding the joker playing card in the cave, he confronted Joker about it in Arkham Asylum as Bruce Wayne. Joker failed to acknowledge him and Batman realized that he did not care who Batman was under his mask. The members of the Bat-Family decline to meet with Batman. Later, Batman studies the chemical makeup of the gas Joker used on the Bat-Family, and finds an inert isotope; the chemical compound "Ha".

=== Tie-in plots ===
Batgirl

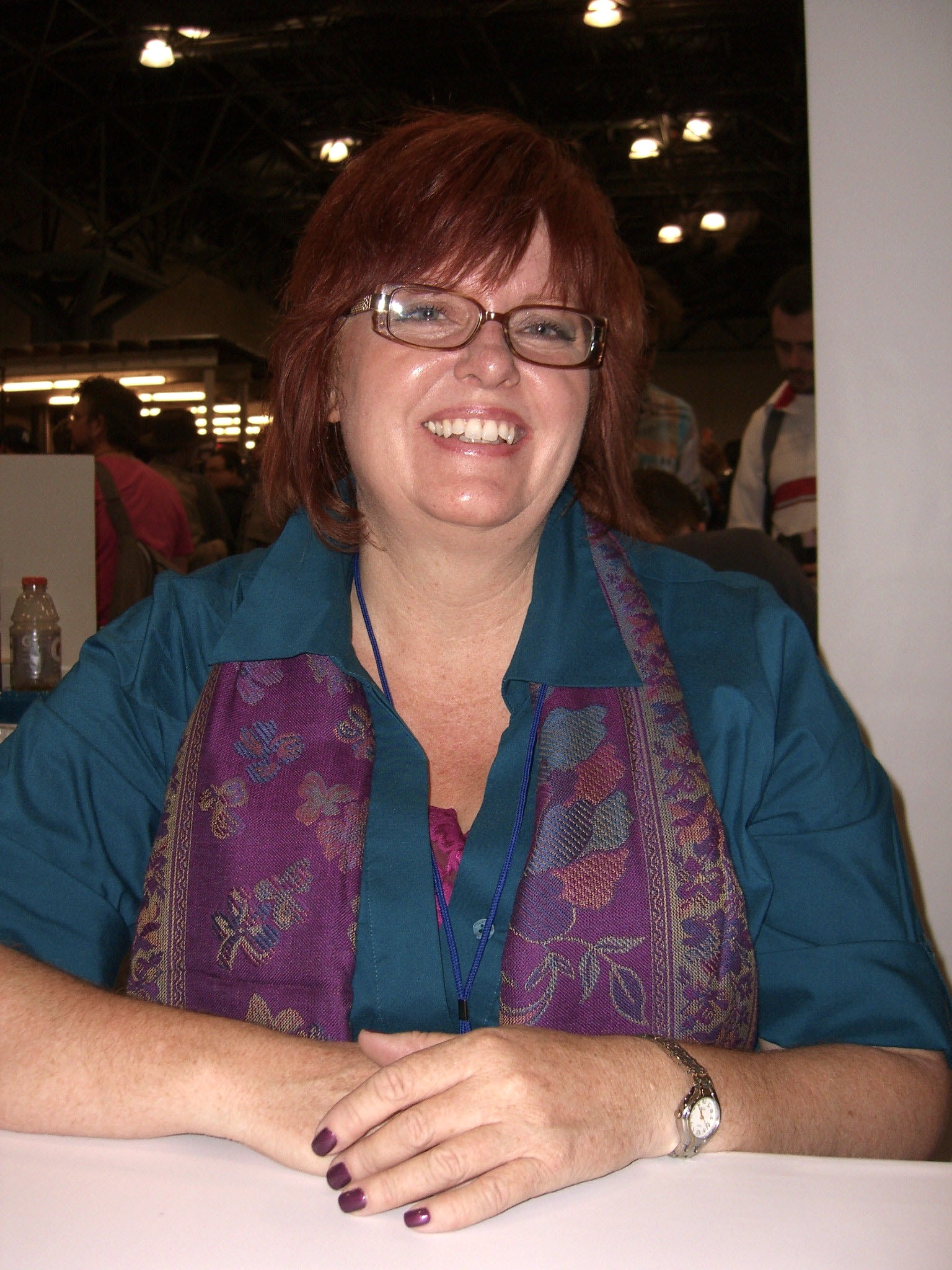
Writer Gail Simone in 2011. Simone wrote Batgirl's first confrontation with the Joker, following her paralysis at his hands in 1988's Batman: The Killing Joke.

In Batgirl #13, Barbara Gordon's mother is attacked in her home by three men in clown masks and Hawaiian shirts, referencing the Joker paralyzing Barbara in Batman: The Killing Joke. In Batgirl #14, Barbara receives a call from someone she believes to be Joker, warning her that men are also coming for her; three men wearing clown masks break in, but Barbara defeats them. The caller reveals that they know Barbara is Batgirl. As Batgirl, she finds the Joker holding her mother in a skating rink where he has killed all the patrons. After confronting the Joker, she learns that the caller is her psychopathic brother James and he led her to Joker to save their mother. Joker then presents Batgirl with her mother's severed finger bearing her wedding ring, and asks Batgirl to marry him. In Batgirl #15, Batgirl determines that she is going to break Batman's rule and finally kill Joker. Batgirl meets Joker at a church, accompanied by his goons and a priest. James calls and tells Joker to leave Batgirl and their mother alone, but Joker refuses, prompting James to travel to the church. After the wedding, Joker attempts to cut off Batgirl's limbs, intending to store her in his basement to keep her from cheating on him. James arrives and claims he has freed his mother, allowing Batgirl to fight Joker's henchmen. James betrays Batgirl, rendering her unconscious and trading her to Joker in exchange for his mother's life. When Batgirl awakens, the Joker prepares to show her an unseen item on a cloche; the story is concluded in Batman #17.

Batman and Robin

In Batman and Robin #15, Batman's son Damian defies his father's orders to remain in the Batcave and investigates Alfred's kidnapping. The investigation leads to Gotham Zoo where Damian is captured by Joker. Joker accuses Damian and the other members of Batman's family of being a burden that prevents Batman from being the best foe for Joker. Joker tells Damian that his and Batman's greatest fear is being responsible for the other's death. Joker then presents Damian with Batman in Joker makeup, and states that Damian must kill Batman before Batman kills him. Unwilling to kill his father, Damian chooses death, but the Joker kills Batman before he can deal a fatal blow. Damian passes out from Joker venom and Batman is revealed to be a fake; as Damian recovers from the toxin, the Joker presents him with a cloche (concluded in Batman #17).

Catwoman

Catwoman is hired to steal a large chess piece from a citywide game of chess. After stealing the piece it is revealed to contain a living person, before it explodes. Catwoman saves a young orphan trapped in a pawn chess piece, and is then confronted by Joker, who is revealed as the person who hired her. Joker convinces her to allow herself to be captured to spare the orphan's life. Joker repeatedly attacks Catwoman, accusing her of needing Batman to save her and trying to convince her to break Batman's heart and turn him into a more focused hero. Catwoman denies loving Batman and accuses Joker of in fact being in love with him. Joker admits that he is, before they part ways.

Detective Comics

In Detective Comics #15, while distracted by his search for the Joker, Batman is forced to confront Clayface, who has been chemically possessed by Poison Ivy into believing they are married, turning him into a fierce bodyguard. Batman uses a modified herbicide to kill Ivy's plants embedded in Clayface, freeing his mind before he then escapes into the sewers. Meanwhile, the Joker forcibly recruits the Penguin to aid in his plan. Penguin leaves his henchman Ignatius Ogilvy in charge, who usurps Penguin's criminal empire, allies himself with Ivy, and dubs himself Emperor Penguin. Ivy later finds Clayface, unaware he is no longer under her control, and Clayface attacks her. In Detective Comics #16, multiple gangs rise up in Gotham, emboldened by the Joker's return; one gang, the "League of Smiles", takes hostages in a youth center until one of their own decides to let the hostages go. Batman arrives later and finds the defector has cut the flesh from his mouth so that he cannot be like Joker. The remaining members of the League return to their leader, the Merrymaker, who states that their mission is just starting. Meanwhile, Emperor Penguin seizes control of Gotham's underworld, killing his opponents and framing the Joker for their deaths.

Nightwing

In Nightwing #15, the Joker kills Jimmy, the star clown of Haly's Circus. He also breaks Dick Grayson's former lover Raya out of Blackgate Prison. After testing the Joker venom used on Jimmy, Dick discovers an intentional anomaly that leads him to an abandoned aerospace facility. There, Dick is confronted by Raya, her face resembling the Joker's, and dressed in a makeshift Nightwing uniform. She attacks Dick while Joker flees, until her body rejects the Joker's toxin and she dies. Dick finds a message carved into her body, announcing the Joker's party at Haly's Circus. In the circus, Nightwing is confronted by the exhumed corpses of the circus members who have died. Nightwing tackles Joker, but is then shown the living members of the circus, all transformed like Raya, who attack Nightwing and knock him unconscious. When he awakens, Joker prepares to show him an unseen item on a cloche (concluded in Batman #17).

Red Hood and the Outlaws

Joker drugs Jason Todd's lover and calls the police to his apartment, Todd escapes and goes to warn Batman, but the Joker predicts his actions and gasses Todd unconscious. When he wakes, Joker provides artifacts of Todd's youth including a bullet that shot his father, and a recreation of how he found his dead mother, intimating he knows Todd's real identity. As Todd works his way towards Joker, he falls through a trap door, landing in a pit next to an unconscious Red Robin (Todd's story concludes in Teen Titans #16). Starfire and Arsenal's story ties in with, and concludes, that of the Teen Titans in Teen Titans #15. Starfire and Harper travel to Gotham to help Todd, and encounter the Teen Titans. Together, the group recover Joker's pre-prepared antidote syringes and inject Joker-venom afflicted citizens, returning them to normal. Elsewhere, Joker paints Todd's Red Hood mask and says he is in for a surprise.

Suicide Squad

During Deadshot's funeral, Joker kidnaps Harley from the Suicide Squad. He has her meet with Batman (as seen in Batman #14), and then attempts to dump her in a chemical bath. Harley manages to escape but the Joker attacks her with rabid hyenas and then incapacitates her, before chaining her up in a room filled with skeletons, some dressed similarly to Harley; Joker states that she is not the first Harley or the last. Harley bites open her own wrists and uses the blood as lubricant to remove her chains and escape back to the Suicide Squad. When Joker learns of her escape, he states that she might yet become his Harley.

Teen Titans

The Teen Titans travel to Gotham City to help Red Robin, who has been captured by Joker. With Batgirl's advice, they explore Joker's earlier crime scenes, during which Kid Flash's super speed search of a run down apartment block activates Joker's trap by agitating a chemical compound; the chemical becomes airborne and transforms the nearby citizens appearance to resemble the Joker, before they begin mindlessly attacking the Titans. Arsenal and Starfire arrive to help; this team up is concluded in Red Hood and the Outlaws #16. Continuing from Red Hood and the Outlaws #15, Red Hood and Red Robin work together to escape Joker's captivity after he seemingly presents their fathers as hostages. Todd shoots the Joker, who is revealed to be a body double; the shots trigger a gas release, knocking Todd and Red Robin out. When they awake, Joker presents them each with a cloche (concluded in Batman #17).

== Titles involved ==
Title	Issue(s)	Writer(s)	Artist(s)	Notes
Preludes
Batgirl	#13	Gail Simone	Ed Benes	"Knightfall" conclusion
Catwoman	#13	Ann Nocenti	Rafa Sandoval	
Main Storyline
Batman	#13-17	Scott Snyder, James Tynion IV	Greg Capullo, Jock	
Tie-ins
Batgirl	#14-16	Gail Simone	Ed Benes, Daniel Sampere	"Collision" storyline
Catwoman	#14	Ann Nocenti	Rafa Sandoval	
Suicide Squad	#14-15	Adam Glass	Fernando Dagnino	"Running with the Devil" storyline
Batman and Robin	#15-16	Peter J. Tomasi	Patrick Gleason	
Detective Comics	#15-16	John Layman	Jason Fabok	
Nightwing	#15-16	Kyle Higgins	Eddy Barrows	
Red Hood and the Outlaws	#15-16	Scott Lobdell	Timothy Green II	
Teen Titans	#15-16	Scott Lobdell, Fabian Nicieza	Brett Booth	

== Publication history ==
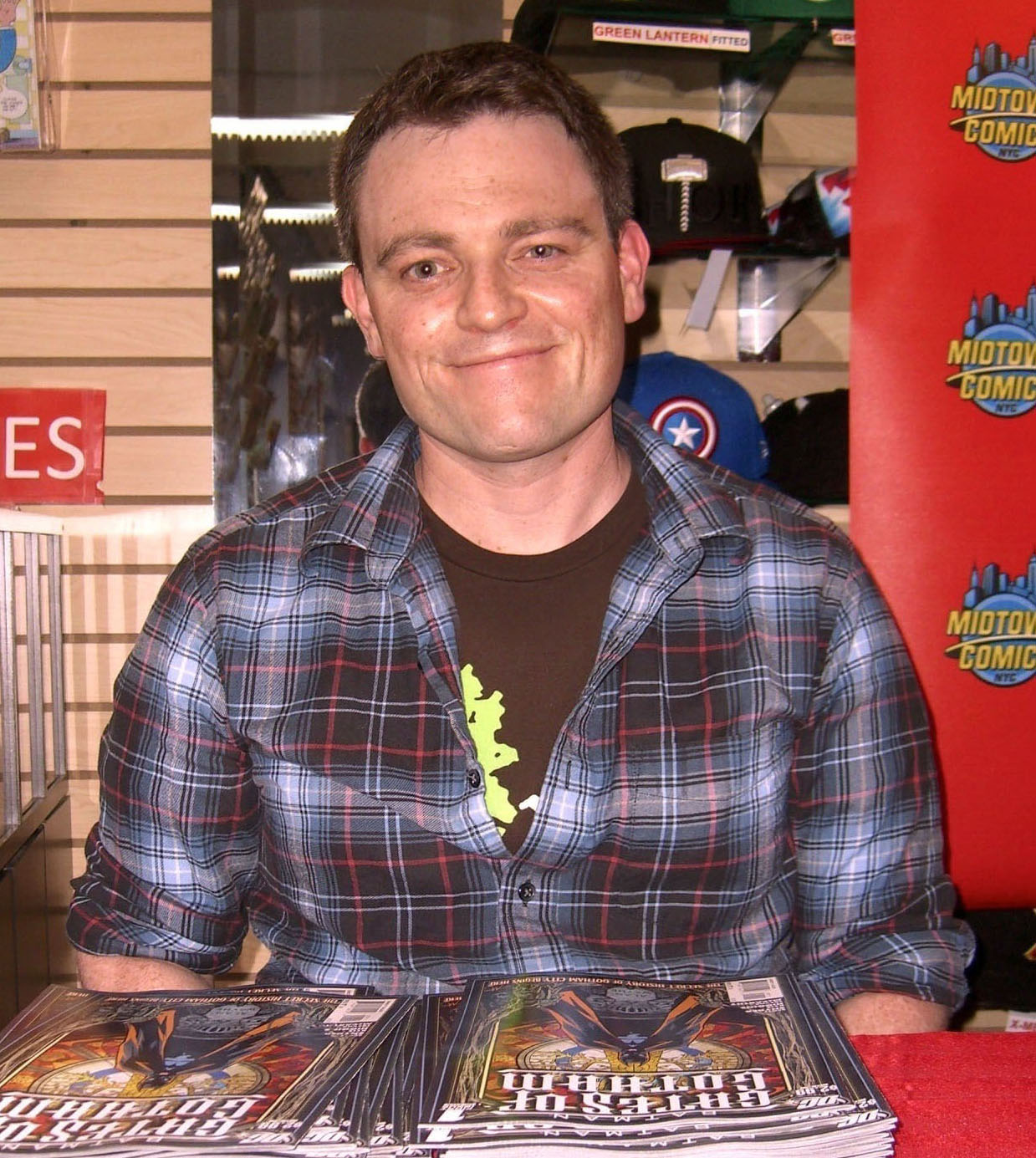
Scott Snyder in 2011. Snyder wrote the main Batman series and oversaw the tie-ins for "Death of the Family".

The return of the Joker since his initial New 52 appearance in Detective Comics #1 was teased in early July 2012. "Death of the Family" was first printed between October 2012 and February 2013, and spanned 23 individual issues across nine separate series, each focusing on individual members of Batman's extended supporting cast: Batman (#13-17), which served as the main plot between Batman and the Joker; Batgirl (#13-16); Batman and Robin (#15-16) which focused on Batman's son Damian Wayne, the current Robin; Catwoman (#13-14); Detective Comics (#15-16) which focused on Batman; Nightwing (#15-16); and Suicide Squad (#14-15), which focused on Joker's sometimes girlfriend Harley Quinn. The arc also included a crossover story in Red Hood and the Outlaws (#15-16) and Teen Titans (#15-16), which focused on both the former Robin, Jason Todd, and Red Robin, starting story threads in one series that were then concluded in the other. The story began with issues #13 of Batman, Batgirl, and Catwoman, the latter two serving as a prelude to the story. The series were published monthly and all concluded in January 2013, except for Batman, which published its seventeenth issue in February, the final chapter of the story. At the 2014 Chicago Comic & Entertainment Expo, Scott Snyder revealed the story was always intended as "a two-part story", and his idea for the second story would be about how much the Joker hates Batman.

"Death of the Family" was followed in 2014 by "Endgame", in which the Joker returns to wreak vengeance on Batman for rejecting their relationship. Snyder described it as the concluding chapter of his Joker story.

== Reception ==
Batman

Batman
	CBR	IGN	Newsarama
Issue	Rating		
13	5/5 stars	9.7	10/10
14	5/5 stars	9.3	9/10
15	4/5 stars	9.4	7/10
16	4.5/5 stars	9.6	10/10
17	5/5 stars	10	8/10

Batman #13 was generally well received for its plot which was considered to be fittingly horrifying and filled with tension representative of the Joker's return. Snyder's incarnation of the Joker was praised for incorporating historical elements of the character and his dialogue, while providing a new perspective on the character. IGN's Benjamin Bailey said that the story would be part of a classic Batman story, and Comic Book Resources' Ryan Lindsay said the issue is the type of introduction every story deserves. Batman #14 was also well received. Comic Book Resources' Greg McElhatton enjoyed the sense of isolation that emphasized the effect on Batman of not having his supporting cast, Batman's narration and the dialogue between Batman and Joker. IGN's Joey Esposito said that the writing created a realistic threat of danger to the established characters, and appreciated the further increase in tension. Esposito also praised the Joker's final monologue. In contrast, Newsarama considered the issue could be too verbose, but said that the story had great pacing. Batman #15 received positive reviews, but is the lowest graded issue in the Batman tie-ins. Reviewers noted that the story continued to be strong, but was marred by confusing elements created by dialogue structure, unexplained actions such as Batman's glove being removed off panel during a confrontation with Joker, and small artistic inconsistencies. Newsarama's David Pepose praised the opening narration, but was critical of the lack of involvement of the Batman family considering their central purpose in Joker's plan, and Esposito said that the story was masterfully told, highlighting the Batman/Joker dynamic.

Esposito praised Snyder's writing in Batman #16 for its exploration of Batman relationship with his rogues, especially Joker, but criticized the seemingly sudden peril in which Batman's allies are placed as the Batman issues offer no information on the events in their respective tie-in issues, undermining Batman's primary motivation to protect them. Newsarama's Lan Pitts said that Snyder had created a great, unforgettable and suspenseful Batman story, with a Joker that potentially bested all previous incarnations of the character. Comic Book Resources' Kelly Thompson said that the creative team had taken a character of which she was tired (Joker) and reinvented him while creating a pivotal story. Esposito gave the story-arc's finale in Batman #17 a score of 10 out of 10, and said it contained possibly the greatest dialogue exchange between Joker and Batman since the end of The Killing Joke. Esposito also said that the story had "managed to redefine one of the most iconic villains in history - not just in comics, but in literature as a whole - while being able to elevate Batman and his allies to a whole new level". Comic Book Resources' Doug Zawisa said that the issue succeeded as a grand and satisfying conclusion to the series-spanning story arc, but Pepose noted story elements that became fake-outs, and an inconclusive ending as negatives. The Guardian's Stuart Kelly said the overall story arc was a classic in waiting, and said it was both cerebrally satisfying and genuinely spine-tingling.

Greg Capullo's pencil work received consistent praise throughout the series. Esposito said he is possibly the best Batman artist, providing energetic images, while Newsarama described his work as visceral and greatly detailed, but sometimes cluttered. Other reviewers noted the detail in his work and described his contributions as astounding. Jonathan Glapion and FCO Plascencia also generally received praise for, respectively, their inks and colors.

Batgirl

Batgirl was considered one of the strongest tie-ins, owing to the pre-existing relationship between Batgirl and the man who disabled her, Joker, highlighting the emotional trauma and desire for revenge that is understandable in Batgirl's character which allowed the story to serve as natural progression for Batgirl instead of a tie-in to the greater Batman story. The art by Ed Benes and Daniel Sampere received a mixed response from reviewers who described it as fair and serviceable, but also noted garish colors and inconsistent quality. Newsarama's Aaron Duran complimented Sampere for emphasizing the personal nature of the characters, bringing the reader "uncomfortably" close, but said that the effect gradually becomes desensitizing.

Batman and Robin

Batman and Robin #15 was well received for its story, the characterization of Damian Wayne and the Joker, and the Joker's dialogue which was described as "wordplay formed into incisive barbs", and more menacing that Snyder's incarnation; a Joker that revels in filth. Patrick Gleason's art was praised for creating terrifying and disturbing images that add texture to the pages. Batman and Robin #16's narrative was considered lesser than the previous issue's, with Newsarama describing it as both "killer and filler" designed to keep Damian occupied while the main story proceeded, but appreciating the fight between Damian and what he believes to be his father. Esposito said that Damian's characterization sees him display resolve "unimaginable for a 10-year old", making the case for Damian being the best Robin. Newsarama again praised Gleason's horror-toned imagery, expressing a desire that he replace Capullo on the Batman installments.

Catwoman

Catwoman #13 received criticism for featuring a central story that was largely unrelated to the "Death of the Family" arc despite its branding as a tie-in. The tie-in segment was described as uninspired, and weak with absurd execution, while Schedeen noted that the sporadic appearances of the Joker interrupted the flow of the larger unrelated plot, diminishing the attempt to convey drama in the issue's final scene. Catwoman #14 received similar criticism; Thompson said the Joker/Catwoman concept fell flat and offered no insight about either character, and regressed Catwoman's relationship with Batman, presenting her inner thoughts as shallow. Pepose scored the issue 3 out of 10, saying the issue was all spectacle without substance. Pepose said "when the big insight is that the Joker 'just wants to be Batman's be-yotch', you know things have taken a wrong turn somewhere". Pepose noted that Joker having the upper hand in dialogue with Catwoman, made the character appear like a rube in her own book.

Nightwing

IGN's Jesse Schedeen scored Nightwing #15 6.1 out of ten, and #16 7.4 out of 10. For Issue #15, Schedeen was critical of the event interrupting the book's ongoing story development and considered that there were storytelling missteps that undermined the emotional impact of the book's events. Comic Book Resources's Greg McElhatton however said the issue worked well as both a tie-in and an individual Nightwing tale that progressed the character's personal, professional and superhero relationships. For Issue #16, Schedeen felt that the overarching story in the Death of the Family books required an increasing amount of suspension of disbelief in how Joker simultaneously assaulted each member of the Batman family and his failure to actually eliminate those members after capturing them. Schedeen said that the issue was emotionally brutal, and frustrating because Nightwing is easily rendered helpless by the Joker's machinations. Eddy Barrows artwork was generally praised for its somber, shadowy tone in both books, but Schedeen criticized inconsistent character appearances.

Suicide Squad

IGN's Jesse Schedeen labeled Suicide Squad #14 as a superfluous tie-in that added nothing meaningful to the "Death of the Family" story arc or the relationship between Harley Quinn and Joker, but described Fernando Dagnino's art as solid, with moody and shadowy tones that fit the somber tone of the series' own on-going story. Comic Book Resources' Greg McElhatton said the issue was saved by the parts of the story unrelated to "Death of the Family", and the tie-in plot slightly diminished the momentum of the series. McElhatton called Dagnino's art uneven, citing the Joker's appearance as the most problematic visual that "never quite looks right". Schedeen said that issue #15 improved by focusing on the Joker/Quinn plot, but criticized the Joker's characterization for lacking the same creepiness and inhumanity displayed in other "Death of the Family" books, and found the plot point of Joker being legitimately in love with Quinn out of place for the character and the arc's central plot of Joker shedding his humanity entirely.

=== Sales ===
"Death of the Family" was a sales success, with issues regularly appearing in the top monthly sales during its release. Batman was consistently the highest selling series in the story, outselling the next best selling series, Detective Comics by approximately 45,000 units. Batman #14 was the highest selling issue, selling an estimated 159,744 units in November 2012, and appearing at number 2 in the sales charts, behind the first issue of All New X-Men (181,710 units).

Series	Issue	Published	Estimated no. of units sold	Sales chart position	Ref.
Batgirl	#13	October 2012	50,070	36	
Batgirl	#14	November 2012	77,475	17	
Batgirl	#15	December 2012	75,337	13	
Batgirl	#16	January 2013	72,461	17	
Batman	#13	October 2012	148,293	3	
Batman	#14	November 2012	159,744	2	
Batman	#15	December 2012	151,561	3	
Batman	#16	January 2013	145,904	2	
Batman	#17	February 2013	150,684	3	
Batman and Robin	#15	December 2012	89,874	8	
Batman and Robin	#16	January 2013	81,483	12	
Catwoman	#13	October 2012	40,144	52	
Catwoman	#14	November 2012	63,659	27	
Detective Comics	#15	December 2012	106,390	5	
Detective Comics	#16	January 2013	92,288	8	
Nightwing	#15	December 2012	74,404	15	
Nightwing	#16	January 2013	69,634	20	
Red Hood and the Outlaws	#15	December 2012	64,100	21	
Red Hood and the Outlaws	#16	January 2013	59,613	24	
Suicide Squad	#14	November 2012	63,697	26	
Suicide Squad	#15	December 2012	57,129	30	
Teen Titans	#15	December 2012	68,704	17	
Teen Titans	#16	January 2013	63,718	21	

== Collected editions ==
Title	Material collected	Published date	ISBN
Batman Vol 3: Death of the Family	Batman #13-17	May 2014	978-1401246020
Batgirl Vol. 3: Death of the Family	Batgirl #14-19, Batman #17, and material from Young Romance #1	June 2014	978-1401246280
Batman and Robin Vol. 3: Death of the Family	Batman and Robin #15-17, Batman and Robin Annual #1, Batman #17.	December 2013	978-1401242688
Catwoman Vol. 3: Death of the Family	Catwoman #0, 13-18, and material from Young Romance #1	October 2013	978-1401242725
Nightwing Vol. 3: Death of the Family	Nightwing #13-18, Batman #17	December 2013	978-1401244132
Red Hood and the Outlaws Vol. 3: Death of the Family	Red Hood and the Outlaws #0, 14-17, Teen Titans #15-16	December 2013	978-1401244125
Teen Titans Vol. 3: Death of the Family	Teen Titans #14-20	December 2013	978-1401243210
Joker: Death of the Family	Batman #13, 14, 17, Catwoman #13-14, Batgirl #13-16, Suicide Squad #14-15, Batman and Robin #15-16, Nightwing #15-16, Detective Comics #15-16, Red Hood and the Outlaws #15-16, Teen Titans #15-16	October 2013	978-1401242350

== In other media ==
=== Television ===
- The third season of Gotham adapted some plot elements from the Death of the Family storyline. In the episodes "Smile Like You Mean It" and "The Gentle Art of Making Enemies", the show's Proto-Joker, Jerome Valeska (played by Cameron Monaghan) gets his face removed, but eventually gets it back from the GCPD and staples it back on.

=== Video games ===
- The Joker's dinner scene in Batman: The Enemy Within is somewhat similar to the one in Death of the Family.
