= Beware the Green-Eyed Monster =

- Gotham episode
- Episode no.: Season 3 Episode 11
- Directed by: Danny Cannon
- Written by: John Stephens
- Cinematography by: Crescenzo Notarile
- Editing by: Barrie Wise
- Production code: T13.19911
- Original air date: November 28, 2016
- Running time: 43 minutes

Guest appearances
- John Doman as Carmine Falcone; James Carpinello as Mario Calvi; Ivana Milicevic as Maria Kyle; Anthony Carrigan as Victor Zsasz

Episode chronology
| ← Previous "Time Bomb" | Next → "Ghosts" |
- Gotham season 3

"Beware the Green-Eyed Monster" (also known as "Mad City: Beware the Green-Eyed Monster") is the eleventh episode and mid-season finale of the third season, and 55th episode overall from the Fox series Gotham. The episode was written by co-executive producer John Stephens and directed by Danny Cannon. It was first broadcast on November 28, 2016. In the episode, Gordon discovers that Mario is infected and needs to stop him before he marries Lee, but Mario is one step ahead of him and plans on making it look like he is jealous. Meanwhile, Nygma receives information about Isabella's death and despite shrugging it off, he is certain it could be true. Bruce, Selina and Alfred plan on infiltrating a Court's building, receiving a surprising help.

The episode received positive reviews, with critics praising Cory Michael Smith's performance in the episode.

== Plot ==
In Gotham Bio-Lab, a hematologist is working on finding a cure on Alice Tetch's blood. He goes to a bar, where Mario (James Carpinello) meets him. He is fearing that Gordon (Ben McKenzie) will continue waiting for Lee (Morena Baccarin) and asks the hematologist about the test on the virus. He refuses and Mario kills him in an alley, crushing his skull.

Bruce (David Mazouz) and Alfred (Sean Pertwee) are told by Jacob (Julien Seredowych) that Volk and his enforcer are dead. Certain that the Court has eventually discovered that they broke the deal, they decide to team up with Jacob. The GCPD is investigating the hematologist's murder, a man named Ryan Pfeffer and because of the smashed skull, Gordon suspects that Barnes may be responsible as the wallet reveals his position in the bio-lab. Barbara (Erin Richards) shows up at Dahl Manor and tells Nygma (Cory Michael Smith) that Cobblepot (Robin Lord Taylor) is responsible for Isabella's death because he is in love with him but Nygma shrugs it off.

Jacob takes Bruce, Alfred and Selina (Camren Bicondova) to a building that the Court possesses. The building is guarded with two alarms in the roof and the basement. Bruce tells Selina that they will break in that day. At Gotham Bio-Lab, Gordon visits the facility in case someone uses Pfeffer's card but the guard tells him that the card was just used a few minutes ago. Gordon rushes to the lab and finds a doctor dead. Mario appears, attacks him and leaves him unconscious, but decides not to kill him. While Bullock (Donal Logue) tends him, they are told by Fox (Chris Chalk) that the files were missing and Gordon's hand has "Arkham" written on it. He visits Arkham to question Tetch (Benedict Samuel), deducing that he infected people before he was incarcerated and needs a name. Tetch refuses but accidentally reveals that the one he loves will die by hate and that he went from "healer to killer". Gordon instantly deduces that the killer is Mario.

Gordon has Mario tested but Fox states he's cleared of the virus. Gordon arrives at Lee's address and finds Mario and he deduces that Tetch injected him while he was experiencing the drug effects. Mario has Zsasz (Anthony Carrigan) watch for Gordon in the apartment but after a time, Zsasz lets him go. Nygma announces to Cobblepot that he plans on resigning and that they could continue working as partners but Cobblepot reveals his romantic feelings, giving Nygma the realization that Cobblepot indeed killed Isabella. He even contemplates killing him on a public awarding but can't make himself do it. Cobblepot wants things to go the way they were and Nygma seemingly agrees.

Gordon arrives at the wedding ceremony and finds Lee, in her dress, and tries to dissuade her from marrying. He subsequently realizes that Mario beat the virus through a cure in the files, had himself tested and told Zsasz to free him so he could arrive at the wedding and look like a jealous ex. Lee suggests that he gets help, causing Gordon to confess that he still loves her and that he did find her after his release, but backed off when he saw Lee happy with Mario. This causes Lee to cry and slap Gordon in the face and has Falcone (John Doman) take him out of the church. Gordon fails to beat them and Lee and Mario marry.

Lucius and Bullock discover that Mario's test came back off the charts and set out to find him. With Jacob and the gang dead, Bruce, Alfred and Selina enter the building to find the device. Selina is forced to walk on a wire to avoid alarms and opens the vault to find an owl sculpture. Talon arrives and attacks them, brutally wounding Alfred. A mysterious woman who has been following them arrives and distracts Talon and Alfred stabs a dagger in his neck, killing him. The woman reveals herself to be Maria (Ivana Milicevic), Selina's mom and they flee.

Nygma arrives at Sirens and decides to team up with Barbara, Tabitha (Jessica Lucas) and Butch (Drew Powell) to destroy Cobblepot and everything he loves. Lee and Mario arrive at a refuge in the woods before they leave Gotham. Gordon arrives with Falcone, demanding to know where he is. Falcone reveals that he knew something was wrong with Mario but that he didn't know about the virus. He eventually gives Gordon the location but makes him swear that he will bring him alive. Mario, now fully infected by the virus and certain that Lee still loves Gordon, is about to stab her when Gordon arrives and fatally guns down Mario, causing the knife to fall in the river. Lee looks at Gordon with shock and horror.

== Production ==
=== Development ===
In November 2016, it was announced that the eleventh episode of the season will be titled "Beware the Green-Eyed Monster" and was to be written by John Stephens and directed by Danny Cannon.

=== Casting ===
On October 31, 2016, Ivana Milicevic was cast as Selina's mom, Maria Kyle, with the role being described as "a tough-as-nails operator with an arsenal of street smarts, world-class drifter who's able to hide her true self behind a variety of personas. A 'criminal through and through,' she is willing to use anything and anyone to get what she wants. Her one weakness, however, is the daughter she abandoned — and the only person in the world she truly loves." Camren Bicondova stated that "It doesn't really go the way Selina expected it to... It doesn't take a good turn!" Maggie Geha and Michael Chiklis don't appear in the episode as their respective characters. Despite its announcement in November 2016, the reports didn't specify any guest stars.

== Reception ==
=== Viewers ===
The episode was watched by 3.37 million viewers with a 1.0/3 share among adults aged 18 to 49. This was a 3% decrease in viewership from the previous episode, which was watched by 3.44 million viewers with a 1.1/4 in the 18-49 demographics. With this rating, Gotham ranked second for FOX, behind Lucifer, fifth (and last) on its timeslot and seventh for the night behind CMA Country Christmas, Lucifer, Timeless, a rerun of Kevin Can Wait, a rerun of The Big Bang Theory, and The Voice.

With Live+7 DVR viewing factored in, the episode was watched by 5.07 million viewers and had an overall rating of 1.7 in the 18–49 demographic.

=== Critical reviews ===
Professional ratings
Review scores
| Source | Rating |
|---|---|
| Rotten Tomatoes (Tomatometer) | 71% |
| Rotten Tomatoes (Average Score) | 7.0 |
| IGN | 7.6 |
| TV Fanatic | 5.0/5.0 stars |
| TV Overmind | 5.0/5.0 stars |

"Mad City: Beware the Green-Eyed Monster" received generally positive reviews from critics. The episode received a rating of 71% with an average score of 7.0 out of 10 on the review aggregator Rotten Tomatoes.

Matt Fowler of IGN gave the episode a "good" 7.6 out of 10 and wrote in his verdict, "'Beware the Green-Eyed Monster' was a decent fall send-off for Gotham, focusing heavily on Jim and Lee's tortured love story. Last week, it seemed like Mario's blood rage might be the thing to bring these two back together. Instead, it split them further apart with a grimness reminiscent of Gordon's spiral from last season. Too bad the very final moments of this one felt like a tacked-on attempt to force a cliffhanger."

Nick Hogan of TV Overmind gave the series a perfect 5-star rating out of 5, writing "Gotham did it's [sic] job to get me primed for the back half of the season with one of its best episodes of the season so far. Beware the Green-Eyed Monster does a masterful job of not only portraying the different sides of jealousy and envy, but does so in a way that fits perfectly with the story."

Sage Young of EW gave the episode a "B" and stated: "Here's a wedding tip for you: When you're still in love with the bride, it doesn't matter how many innocents the groom has killed. If you don't forever hold your peace anyway, you'll come off looking like the jerk. Jim Gordon learned this lesson when he discovered the frightening truth about Lee's fiancé, Mario — to her, the seemingly noble doctor who turned away from his family's criminal lifestyle and chose a career of service instead."

Lisa Babick from TV Fanatic, gave a perfect 5-star rating out of 5, stating: "We always knew Gotham needed a woman's touch, and if Barbara has her way, she's about to become Gotham's new underworld Queen. Oh, and lots of other crazy stuff took place on Gotham Season 3 Episode 11. It was enough to make your head crack open with awe, bewilderment, or a combination of both." Vinnie Mancuso of The New York Observer wrote, "Soooo yeah, here we are, another Gotham Fall Finale come and gone, and we're left with everyone in a significantly worse place than where they started. Let's start with Jim, who over the course of this episode manages to womp-womp so hard and so often that the combined trombone noise of his actions ripped a whole into another dimension where everyone communicates solely through dark, sullen glances and gritted jawlines (it's called The Affair, Sundays at 10 on Showtime)."

MaryAnn Sleasman of TV.com wrote, "I've been hard on Gotham this season because it's hard to watch a series featuring a franchise that I care about, and actors that I genuinely like, and a concept that I should be in love with, continue to fumble through violent cycles of good and unwatchable. I know Gotham can do better. It has done better. Perhaps by finally getting all of the Tetch blood nonsense out of its system, fridging Mario and gearing up for a mob war between Penguin and his former friends, and officially taking on the Court of Owls, that Gotham is trying to rebuild on the strongest of its roots." Sydney Bucksbaum of Nerdist wrote, "Leave it to a fall finale to really blow things up on Gotham!... Yeah, it's safe to say that nothing will be the same when Gotham returns from its mini winter hiatus."

Robert Yanis, Jr. of Screenrant wrote, "With one of the show's central relationships now in serious jeopardy, the rest of season 3 will certainly bring intriguing changes to the criminal underworld." Kayti Burt of Den of Geek gave a 2-star rating out of 5 and wrote, "There were things to like about the fall finale, but they were overshadowed by the return of a hero protagonist it's really hard to get behind. (Guys, Jim Gordon shoots a lot of people.)"
