= The Gentle Art of Making Enemies (Gotham) =

- Gotham episode
- Episode no.: Season 3 Episode 14
- Directed by: Louis Shaw Milito
- Written by: Seth Boston
- Cinematography by: Christopher Norr
- Editing by: Barrie Wise
- Production code: T13.19914
- Original air date: January 30, 2017
- Running time: 43 minutes

Guest appearances
- Cameron Monaghan as Jerome Valeska; Leslie Hendrix as Kathryn; James Remar as Frank Gordon

Episode chronology
← Previous "Smile Like You Mean It"	Next → "How the Riddler Got His Name"
- Gotham season 3

"The Gentle Art of Making Enemies" is the fourteenth episode and winter finale of the third season, and 58th episode overall from the Fox series Gotham. It is also the last episode to have the subtitle "Mad City". The episode was written by Seth Boston and directed by Louis Shaw Milito. It was first broadcast on January 30, 2017.

In the episode, with Gotham now falling into darkness, Jerome and his followers begin to wreak havoc across the city while Jerome kidnaps Bruce to finish what he started on the night he died. His plan includes taking him to a carnival where citizens are used as the attractions for his amusement while Gordon, Alfred and Bullock rush to stop him. Meanwhile, Cobblepot sets off to find Nygma but soon discovers in which side Nygma is on. The episode is heavily based on the popular graphic novels The Dark Knight Returns, Batman: The Killing Joke, and Batman: Death of the Family, on which certain events are applied to the series.

The episode received enormous praise from critics, with significant praise towards the nods to the comics, Mazouz's and Monaghan's performance and the ending.

== Plot ==
Following the power outage, the GCPD is filled with criminals while the police officers attempt to arrest the criminals. Meanwhile, Cobblepot (Robin Lord Taylor) and his henchmen arrive at a warehouse and find Nygma (Cory Michael Smith) waiting there. He kills the henchmen and shows Cobblepot Isabella's wreaked car to reveal that he knows his involvement in her death.

Kathryn (Leslie Hendrix) and a Court member (James Remar) discuss the events that are happening on Gotham with the member telling her to give the GCPD a chance although she is doubtful of his faith on "him". With the lights not coming back until the next day, Gordon (Ben McKenzie) and Bullock (Donal Logue) discuss Jerome's (Cameron Monaghan) next move and remember that he talked with Lee (Morena Baccarin) and discover that he is planning to kill Bruce (David Mazouz). Nygma ties Cobblepot to Isabella's car, prompting Cobblepot to confess that he killed Isabella and did for his love for him. Nygma also puts a cauldron of corrosive acid tied to a chained big piece of ice so when the ice melts, the acid will kill Cobblepot.

Bruce and Alfred (Sean Pertwee) are attacked at Wayne Manor by Jerome and his followers, who destroys the owl statue. Jerome takes Bruce and orders the followers to kill Alfred. Gordon arrives just in time to kill the followers and save Alfred. Jerome takes Bruce to a boardwalk circus where the citizens are used as game attractions for the followers' amusement. Jerome kills one of his followers and uses his blood to draw a face on Bruce's mouth. Meanwhile, Cobblepot manages to break free when a police officer helps him. He returns to Dahl Manor and is taken by Butch (Drew Powell) and Tabitha (Jessica Lucas).

Jerome has Bruce tied to a post in order to close the event with a "boom" and has a cannon filled with a cannonball and knives in order to kill him. Gordon, Alfred and Bullock arrive and fight the followers while Jerome ignites the cannon. In the last second, Bruce frees himself and flees while Jerome follows him. Barbara (Erin Richards) tells Cobblepot that if he wants to live, he needs to call Nygma in order to kill him. However, Cobblepot realizes that love involves the sacrifice and discovers that he ruined Nygma's happiness for his and decides to die instead of calling. Nygma appears, revealing that he wanted him to die so he can see that he can't truly love anyone but is clearly moved by Cobblepot's statement that he can.

Bruce escapes into a house of mirrors while Jerome follows him there. They fight in one of the rooms when Bruce gets the upper hand and brutally beats Jerome, disfiguring him. At Jerome's goading, Bruce takes a shard of glass to kill him but at the last moment, decides not to kill him. He leaves and reunites with Alfred. Jerome gets up and tries to attack Bruce, but is subdued by Gordon, who knocks off his face. Jerome is then arrested and taken to Arkham Asylum with his face being placed back. In Wayne Manor, Bruce tells Alfred about what happened and how he felt that what he did was justice. Alfred states the rules he cannot break and Bruce vows to never kill. Meanwhile, Kathryn talks with a now-brainwashed Five for their new purposes. When Five gets concerned, the Court member replies that he will go with someone to join them as "no one refuses the Court". He visits Gordon, revealing himself to be his uncle Frank Gordon, the man who wore the ring. Nygma takes Cobblepot to the harbor docks in order to kill him. Cobblepot continues pleading that he created him and that he still loves him but Nygma shoots him instead in the stomach and throws his body into the harbor.

== Production ==
=== Development ===
In November 2016, Drew Powell tweeted that the fourteenth episode of the season will be titled "The Gentle Art of Making Enemies" and was to be written by Seth Boston and directed by Louis Shaw Milito.

=== Casting ===
In November 2016, James Remar was cast as Frank Gordon, Gordon's uncle, in a role that was described as "The elder Gordon left Gotham after Jim's father died, but 25 years later, he's back and looking to reconnect with his nephew. But Frank has a dark secret that will force Jim to choose between saving his family and saving Gotham." Remar is the second Dexter vet to join the show, the first being David Zayas. Camren Bicondova, Chris Chalk, Maggie Geha, Benedict Samuel, and Michael Chiklis don't appear in the episode as their respective characters. Despite the announcement in January 2017, no guests stars were announced with the episode's title.

== Reception ==
=== Viewers ===
The episode was watched by 3.46 million viewers with a 1.1/4 share among adults aged 18 to 49. This was a 4% decrease in viewership from the previous episode, which was watched by 3.60 million viewers with a 1.2/4 in the 18-49 demographics. With this rating, Gotham ranked second for FOX, behind Lucifer, third on its timeslot and sixth for the night behind The Odd Couple, Lucifer, a rerun of Kevin Can Wait, a rerun of The Big Bang Theory, and The Bachelor.

The episode ranked as the 56th most watched show of the week and the 24th most watched show of the week in the 18-49 demographics. With Live+7 DVR viewing factored in, the episode had an overall viewership of 5.09 million viewers and a rating of 1.8 in the 18–49 demographic.

=== Critical response ===
Professional ratings
Review scores
Source	Rating
Rotten Tomatoes (Tomatometer)	92%
Rotten Tomatoes (Average Score)	9.53
IGN	8.1
TV Fanatic	5.0/5.0 stars
TV Overmind	5.0/5.0 stars

"Mad City: The Gentle Art of Making Enemies" received enormous praise from critics. The episode received a rating of 92% with an average score of 9.53 out of 10 on the review aggregator Rotten Tomatoes.

Matt Fowler of IGN gave the episode a "great" 8.1 out of 10 and wrote in his verdict, "The Bruce/Jerome stuff was great here in the goofily malicious 'The Gentle Art of Making Enemies,' giving us this show's version of Batman vs. Joker. Elsewhere, with Riddler and Penguin, things didn't go so well as Ed's tired and convoluted revenge plot (thankfully) gasped its last breath."

Nick Hogan of TV Overmind gave the series a perfect 5 star rating out of 5, writing "If we had to go into hiatus (do we HAVE to? *sad face*) this was the way to go. Gotham has proved time and time again that it knows how to excite an audience, this episode was no exception." Sage Young of EW gave the episode a "A" and wrote, "Gotham is a different show now than it was at the end of season 2, and the transition has been smooth. The violence and gore have been amped up to resemble the Gotham City we know from the movies. And these machinations of the town's underworld players are putting them on the brink of a war. While Oswald and Ed played out their Greek tragedy, Tabitha and Barbara were quietly killing all those 'old dudes' who used to call the shots. The crown is up for grabs. Justice is malleable. And Bruce Wayne is ready to get off the sidelines."

Karmen Fox of The Baltimore Sun wrote, "As much as I appreciate innovation, having a winter fragment of episodes was a terrible idea. Yes, it was explosive, and yes, it got viewers excited to see Jerome rejoin Gotham's rogue gallery, but ending it after three episodes is a surefire way to lose momentum." Sydney Bucksbaum of Nerdist wrote, "The Joker came, he saw, and he very nearly almost conquered on Gotham. But thanks to the combined efforts of Jim Gordon and a young Bruce Wayne, he was stopped before he could do any permanent damage to the city."

Robert Yanis, Jr. of Screen Rant wrote, "Moreover, Ed and Penguin's friendship — which was so key to the first half of the season — now looks poised to develop into something far complicated, especially with the bloody way in which this week's episode wraps things up. While Penguin’s perpetual rise and fall has long been a narrative trend for Gotham virtually every season, Ed's story feels like it's just beginning, with the character's true destiny now seemingly right around the corner. But we're getting ahead of ourselves. Let's look at 'The Gentle Art of Making Enemies' a bit closer before getting into any more specifics." Kayti Burt of Den of Geek gave the episode a perfect 5 star rating out of 5 and wrote, "This show will always have its issues, but if it keeps delivering installments like this one, bolstered by the strong talent of its cast, production team, and directors, it makes a good argument for its continued existence in this era of Peak TV. If nothing else, it remains committed to its comic book tone and really is like nothing else on TV."

=== Accolades ===
TVLine named Monaghan the "Performer of the Week" for the week of February 4, 2017, for his performance in this episode. The site wrote, "Monaghan is so good at being colorfully bad, it almost makes us angry every time one of his arcs as that joker, Jerome Valeska, comes to an end."
