= The Executioner (Gotham) =

- Gotham episode
- Episode no.: Season 3 Episode 9
- Directed by: John Behring
- Written by: Ken Woodruff
- Cinematography by: Crescenzo Notarile
- Editing by: Sarah C. Reeves
- Production code: T13.19909
- Original air date: November 14, 2016
- Running time: 43 minutes

Guest appearances
- Chelsea Spack as Isabella; Costa Ronin as Luka Volk; Jeremy Crutchley as Anton

Episode chronology
← Previous "Blood Rush"	Next → "Time Bomb"
- Gotham season 3

"The Executioner" (also known as "Mad City: The Executioner") is the ninth episode of the third season, and 53rd episode overall from the Fox series Gotham. The episode was written by executive producer Ken Woodruff and directed by John Behring. It was first broadcast on November 14, 2016. In the episode, Barnes has been acting as an executioner, killing the criminals that get on his path, and upon seeing that Gordon may implicate him and stop his plans, he will kill him for good. Meanwhile, Ivy finally reveals her true self to Bruce and Selina after a problem while also making a discovery about the last man Ivy robbed. Finally, Nygma is notified of Isabella's death and despite evidence suggesting an accident, he suspects that it was organized.

The episode received positive reviews, with critics praising Chiklis' performance and storyline but the rest of the subplots were criticized.

== Plot ==
Gordon (Ben McKenzie), who is looking for Barnes (Michael Chiklis), prefers not to tell any details to anyone in the force about him, just getting helped by Bullock (Donal Logue), who wants to prove his innocence. Meanwhile, Barnes has been in his hideout where he is going to hang up three bound and gagged criminals who have escaped the police system. After delivering a speech and claiming himself to be the law, he hangs up the criminals.

Ivy (Maggie Geha) has gone with an antiquities dealer to his house. Using a potion, she obliges him to open a vault and then knocks him unconscious. After stealing, the man attacks her but she manages to escape. Meanwhile, Nygma (Cory Michael Smith) has become worried about Isabella and then receives a phone call from the GCPD. He finds about Isabella's death, with the GCPD describing it as an accident and he cries on Cobblepot's shoulder, devastated. Gordon checks on Barnes' office when he returns, suspicious as he was the last person with Symon before dying but Gordon says he didn't see anything. Barnes tells him to accompany him with an enforcer named Sugar who may be connected to the crime scene. Gordon confides to Bullock the address before leaving.

Ivy then visits Selina (Camren Bicondova), showing her that she is really Ivy, shocking her and prompting her to call Bruce (David Mazouz). Suddenly, assassins arrive and raid the squat, forcing them to escape. Selina and Bruce deduce that they work for the man whom Ivy robbed and she needs to return the necklace. Ivy refuses until Bruce offers money to buy it so they can return it. Nygma begins suffering extreme depression for Isabella's death. Cobblepot tells him that it's time to move on and so, Nygma decides to say goodbye to her by going to her crash site.

Barnes stops the car in a different address and he and Gordon find Sugar inside. Despite Sugar claiming that he did not commit the crime, Barnes kills him with his gun and then proposes to Gordon that they work together to clean Gotham from the criminals. Gordon refuses and escapes when Barnes gets distracted while being shot in the distance. The GCPD receive the notification that Gordon killed Sugar and are prepared to catch him but Bullock receives a call from Gordon, who is being chased by Barnes. He decides to seek help from Lee (Morena Baccarin). Meanwhile, Nygma visits the crash site and upon being told by a homeless man, he realizes that the crash was not an accident. He checks Isabella's car and discovers that the brakes were cut off and only someone could have ordered it. Barnes finally corners Gordon on a warehouse when the GCPD arrives, who is now certain that Barnes killed Symon and the other criminals. Gordon and Barnes fight until Gordon shoots Barnes, who is arrested.

Ivy, Selina and Bruce go to return the necklace when they find the man dead with an arrow to the eye. Selina throws the necklace, breaking it and revealing a key. They return to Wayne Manor while the assassins continue raiding Selina's squat, finding evidence of Bruce's involvement. Nygma angrily tells Cobblepot about what he found and that he suspects that the person responsible is Butch, after getting exposed in the gala. They set to get revenge at him, especially Cobblepot. Meanwhile, at Arkham Asylum, Barnes, wearing a straitjacket, keeps screaming "Guilty!".

== Production ==
=== Development ===
In October 2016, it was announced that the ninth episode of the season will be titled "The Executioner" and was to be written by Ken Woodruff and directed by John Behring.

=== Casting ===
Sean Pertwee, Erin Richards, Jessica Lucas, Chris Chalk, Drew Powell and Benedict Samuel don't appear in the episode as their respective characters. In October 2016, it was announced that the guest cast for the episode would include James Carpinello as Mario Calvi, Chelsea Spack as Isabella, Jeremy Crutchley as Anton, and Costa Ronin as Luka Volk. Despite being named, Carpinello didn't appear in the episode.

== Reception ==
=== Viewers ===
The episode was watched by 3.63 million viewers with a 1.2/4 share among adults aged 18 to 49. This was a 3% increase in viewership from the previous episode, which was watched by 3.52 million viewers with a 1.2/4 in the 18-49 demographics. With this rating, Gotham ranked second for FOX, behind Lucifer but beating Lucifer in 18-49 demographics, fourth on its timeslot and ninth for the night behind Timeless, Scorpion, 2 Broke Girls, Man with a Plan, Kevin Can Wait, Dancing with the Stars, and The Voice.

The episode ranked as the 64th most watched show on the week. With Live+7 DVR viewing factored in, the episode was watched by 5.44 million viewers and had an overall rating of 1.9 in the 18–49 demographic.

=== Critical reviews ===
Professional ratings
Review scores
Source	Rating
Rotten Tomatoes (Tomatometer)	100%
Rotten Tomatoes (Average Score)	7.8
IGN	7.3
TV Fanatic	5.0/5.0 stars
TV Overmind	3.5/5.0 stars

"Mad City: The Executioner" received positive reviews from critics. The episode received a rating of 100% with an average score of 7.8 out of 10 on the review aggregator Rotten Tomatoes.

Matt Fowler of IGN gave the episode a "good" 7.3 out of 10 and wrote in his verdict, "Gordon having to face off against psycho vigilante Barnes was a fun, satisfying way to invoking Jim's own past as a someone who's murdered in the name of 'justice.' It also helped solidify that not only was Gordon back on the force, but he was back to do the job the right way. The rest of 'The Executioner' was fairly sub-par though. It's all setting up Ed vs. Oswald, and something with the Court, but the story feels strained right now."

Nick Hogan of TV Overmind gave the series a star rating of 3.5 out of 5, writing "Overall, I found this episode enjoyable, but it emphasized a few of the plots that don't quite make sense to me. Hopefully they will clear up in the next few weeks before hiatus."

Sage Young of EW gave the episode a "B+" and stated: "In theory, justice is about absolutes. But rarely in reality is it uncomplicated. The good of Gotham City have killed and done other unsavory things, yet they’re still holding it down for Team Righteous. And in the best cases, our villains are three dimensional enough to inspire a great deal of empathy. Alice Tetch's blood virus has turned Chief Barnes into a soul that can't stomach the shades of gray that color the city and so refuses to acknowledge that they exist."

Lisa Babick from TV Fanatic, gave a perfect 5 star rating out of 5, stating: "Well, that was one crazy hour. While I loved every minute of it, I was also a bit disappointed – mostly in the Barnes story. Did we really have to lose Big Bad Barnes so soon?" Vinnie Mancuso of New York Observer wrote, "Sure, Gotham introduced the idea that Ivy is simultaneously experimenting with mind-controlling plants, but it also introduced this exchange into my brain forever and ever and ever."

MaryAnn Sleasman of TV.com wrote, "'Mad City: The Executioner' felt like the sort of episode a series like Gotham in the place where it is right now, needs in order to reroute and regroup. Jervis Tetch (Benedict Samuel) is off the board (for now) and with the exception of murdering his bestie/crush's ladyfriend, Penguin (Robin Lord Taylor) has been a good boy. This lull in the usual apocalyptic mayhem of a Monday in Gotham is the sort of shift in focus that enables Gotham to take a breather, a step back, and dedicate some quality screen time to the more character-driven aspects of the series." Robert Yanis, Jr. of Screenrant wrote, "While there's no telling where Barnes will go from here, the show has certainly transformed him into a far more interesting character with its most recent string of episodes."

Kayti Burt of Den of Geek gave a 3 star rating out of 5 and wrote, "That being said, it is still infinitely enjoyable to watch Robin Lord Taylor and Cory Michael Smith play these beats. Oswald is trying so hard to be a good friend to Ed, despite having murdered his girlfriend and there's something tragic about that character tension — at least when the ever-watchable Taylor takes it on. So pour yourself a cup of tea and settle in for the long run with these two. This is probably going to get worse before it gets... yeah, it's just going to get worse. #Nymobblepot"
