= How the Riddler Got His Name =

- Gotham episode
- Episode no.: Season 3 Episode 15
- Directed by: TJ Scott
- Written by: Megan Mostyn-Brown
- Cinematography by: Crescenzo Notarile
- Editing by: Sarah C. Reeves
- Production code: T13.19915
- Original air date: April 24, 2017
- Running time: 43 minutes

Guest appearances
- Leslie Hendrix as Kathryn; Paul Pilcz as Sonny Gilzean; H. Foley as Winston Peters; James Remar as Frank Gordon

Episode chronology
← Previous "The Gentle Art of Making Enemies"	Next → "These Delicate and Dark Obsessions"
- Gotham season 3

"How the Riddler Got His Name" is the fifteenth episode and spring premiere of the third season, and 59th episode overall from the Fox series Gotham. The show is itself based on the characters created by DC Comics set in the Batman mythology. It's also the first episode with the subtitle "Heroes Rise". The episode was written by Megan Mostyn-Brown and directed by TJ Scott. It was first broadcast on April 24, 2017.

In the episode, following shooting Cobblepot and dropping his body in the Gotham Harbor, Nygma begins to question what path he will take next, having remembered his words that without Cobblepot, he won't be anything else. Nygma decides that he will need something or someone to acknowledge who he really is and begins committing crimes that are related to his riddle games in order to find his true purpose: a real enemy. Meanwhile, Bruce continues his training while Gordon talks with his Uncle Frank for information regarding his father's death and his role in the Court of Owls.

The episode received mostly positive reviews, with critics praising the character development and Smith's performance.

== Plot ==
On a building, Nygma (Cory Michael Smith) catches a professor in a lab and holds him at gunpoint. He then makes him questions about riddles but the professor fails at every question he makes. Nygma then ties him and reveals he has killed people before and that while he knows who he is, he does not know how to be himself. When the professor fails again at the riddles, Nygma ignites the lab with gas tanks and leaves, killing the professor.

In the Court, Kathryn (Leslie Hendrix) ends Five's (David Mazouz) brainwashing practice, and calls Frank (James Remar) to ensure Gordon's (Ben McKenzie) cooperation with the Court. In Dahl Manor, Nygma has begun taking pills, which causes him to have hallucinations of Cobblepot (Robin Lord Taylor), who torments him for his behavior. When confronted about the recent killings he committed, Nygma reveals he just needs a person who knows his riddles so he can help him. He then concludes that he just needs an enemy and he has just found it: Jim Gordon.

Bullock (Donal Logue) is informed by Fox (Chris Chalk) about the recent killings, finding they all belonged to Gotham's intellectual and artistic elite but he is rejected as they have to focus on more important issues surrounding the city. A man in a fruit suit arrives at the GCPD and gives Bullock and Fox a card with a clue for the next target. The card contains a pattern that signals to the Knight's Tour, a chess exhibit. Nygma is already waiting for Gordon but finds that the person who solved the clue is no one but Fox. He then turns on a device that electrocutes the participants. Fox then solves a clue in the chess parts to find a phone number, calling Nygma. Fox tries to solve it but Nygma refuses, giving him the message, "Tomorrow, when the pawn's on queen, you'll find my next target in the belly of the beast." Bullock and Fox then interrogate Winston Peters (H. Foley), a man who works in a pawn shop in Queens Avenue. Peters admits he was covering for an employee named Teddy Thirio. Fox finds that Thirio is Greek for "Beast."

Bruce and Alfred (Sean Pertwee) continue their training when Bruce receives a note from Selina (Camren Bicondova) for a meeting. Bruce initially refuses but when Alfred recalls when a previous relationship ended badly, Bruce decides to meet her. Bruce then runs into Sonny Gilzean (Paul Pilcz) and his men until Selina arrives. She claims she didn't send him the note and leaves. Sonny and his men start beating him but Bruce finally regains strength and beats them. Before returning to Wayne Manor, he is found by Five, who drugs him and claims that he is made to be him. Five then arrives at Wayne Manor and begins posing as Bruce.

Bullock leaves to attend a police academy graduation. Nygma is again confronted by Cobblepot, who just wants him to admit he's lost without him. Nygma refuses and then, in an hallucination, Cobblepot (using the iconic suit and top hat) begins to sing "Wake Up Alone". This causes Nygma to reveal that killing him killed a part of him but he will find a new road to leave him behind. Fox has Lee (Morena Baccarin) check Thirio's dead body and finds Bullock's badge inside his belly. Nygma arrives at the graduation ceremony, drugs Bullock to take his place as the announcer and throws a gas in the ceremony to knock the cadets. Fox is then told by Nygma that he will need to come with him to solve riddles to get an antidote for the cadets. Fox goes upstairs to find Bullock tied to a chair on the edge of the stairs with three ropes hanging him. Nygma then plays riddles with him for Bullock's life. Fox fails the first two riddles but guesses the last one, but Bullock's rope gets cut and he is nearly thrown to his death, only to be saved by Fox.

Meanwhile, Gordon and Frank go to a cabin in the woods to fully talk. Frank explains that he came back to Gotham in order to solve the problems between him and Gordon. He then explains about the Court of Owls, a secret society that controlled Gotham for centuries which wanted balance to the city. However, time passed and it became corrupt. He says that he and Gordon's father, Peter, were both members of the Court and they want Gordon to join them. He also explains that Peter discovered what the Court planned and as such, the Court had him killed in a car accident and the Court sent him to another place during these years to prove his loyalty and he returned to ask Gordon to join him in taking down the Court. Frank leaves later, reporting to Kathryn about their progress.

After finding Nygma gone, Fox leaves until he is confronted by Nygma on his car. Fox has already discovered that the attacks were just a charade. When Fox asks him for the other murders, Nygma replies there was someone inside him, someone that would cause people to fear him and Fox is now as an enemy to him. Now with Cobblepot gone, Nygma says he finally knows who is he, calling himself "The Riddler". The next day, he has a last conversation with Cobblepot in the harbor before dropping his pills, finally accepting his role as the Riddler. Meanwhile, Ivy is seen caring for a person: a very much alive Cobblepot, whom Ivy saved from the river a few weeks ago. Cobblepot then says he needs to kill someone. Bruce wakes up in a cell and discovers through a window that he is on a snowy mountain.

== Production ==
=== Development ===
In December 2016, it was announced that the fifteenth episode of the season will be titled "How the Riddler Got His Name" and was to be written by Megan Mostyn-Brown and directed by TJ Scott. It was also announced that the subtitle for the new episodes for the rest of the season would be subtitled "Heroes Rise".

=== Writing ===
Series regular Cory Michael Smith has been commenting for over a year that while he hasn't figured out how the costume for the Riddler would be, he was confident it will "certainly be a green suit"; stating that the fittings for the costume were already underway by July 2016. He also added that the new Riddler won't be like the version of Jim Carrey in the film Batman Forever. He claimed, "I want him to be kind of showy. So what we have as the Riddler costume is really classy, and that's kind of what we wanted."

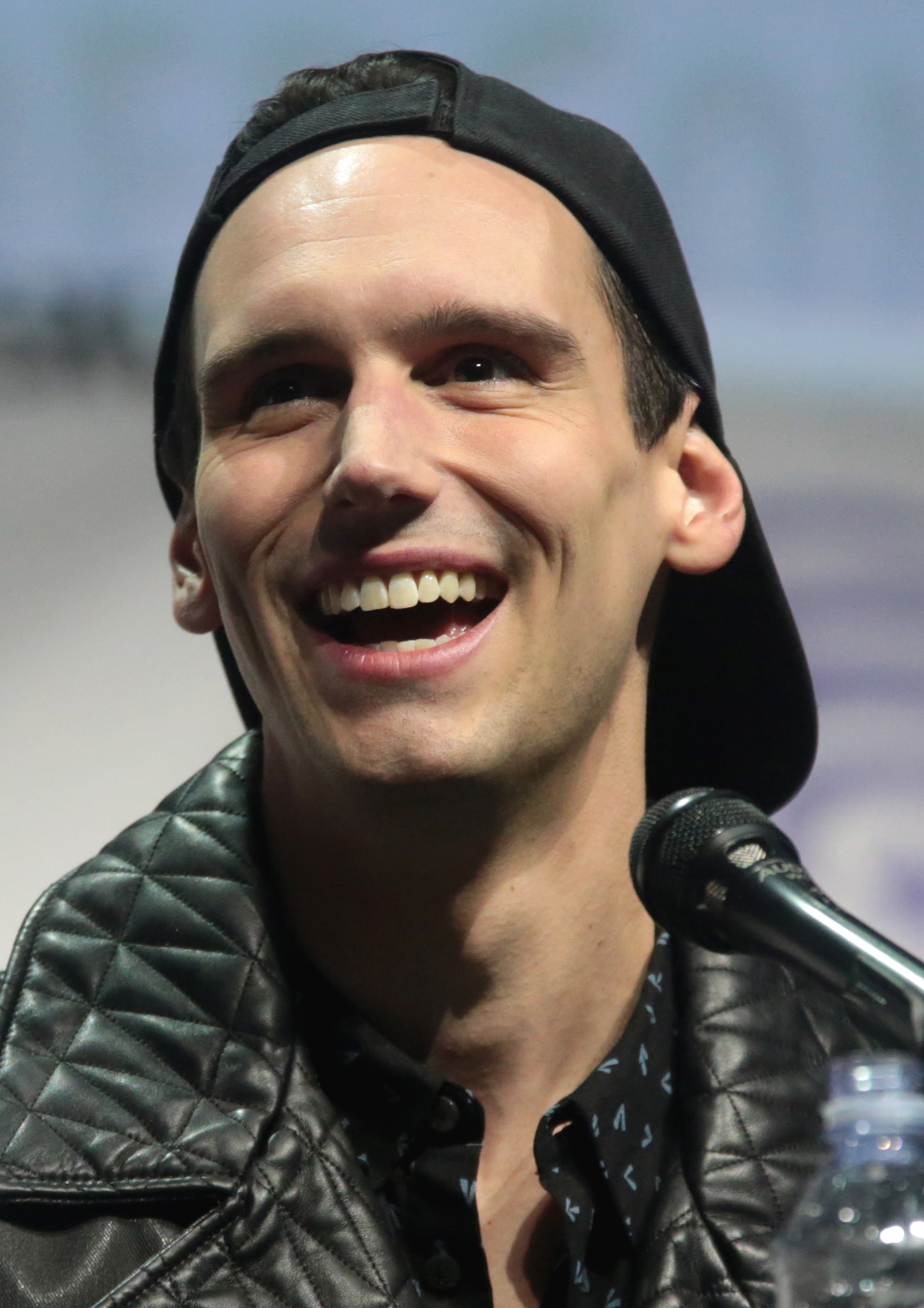
Cory Michael Smith stated that putting on the costume "feels so right"

After the winter finale's airing, new images and promos surfaced showcasing Nygma's green suit, signaling his recognition as the imminent Riddler. Smith commented, "When I put it on, we used the same tailors that make all my suits. It was just beautiful, with the black velvet. We have these gorgeous black shoes with just a hint of a purple/maroon thing, just on the shoes. I got really excited, because it was shocking on the rack, but then it was on my body and I was like, 'This feels so right.'" While initially hesitant about by the "glittery green suit", he said it was a happy day when he put on the suit although he has been multiple times hoping for the Riddler's signature cane. He also said about Nygma, "It's his time to declare that he has accepted the role that fate has given him, and he's going to be a villain, wreak havoc and show people that everyone has underestimated him. He started to feel like the world was deciding for him that it wasn't what he deserved or what he's going to have. That potentially could be one of the scariest (aspects), to be very smooth and poised." while executive producer John Stephens said, "The affection he has for tricks and plans and puzzles, it's his way of applying order to what he sees as a disordered universe." Stephens claimed that he saw his progression as a hero's journey rather than a tragedy.

The episode also features a musical moment performed by Robin Lord Taylor in a fantasy in Nygma's head. Taylor performs a cover of the song, "Wake Up Alone" by Amy Winehouse. While singing, he is also donning the classic Penguin suit including the top hat. He commented on the moment, "If you notice in the scene, it's the first time we introduce the top hat. I'm wearing the traditional Penguin outfit, and so there's this beautiful — in a way, I keep coming to, before I was shot, I keep coming to Riddler and telling him, 'I defined you,' and in this episode, too, 'I made you who you are.' And then weirdly in his fantasy he made the Penguin who he is." He also added, "Even though he's a non-emotional person in this episode and while it may not be romantic, there was friendship and affection there which really came through and was really great to see."

=== Casting ===
Erin Richards, Jessica Lucas, Drew Powell, Benedict Samuel, and Michael Chiklis don't appear in the episode as their respective characters. In April 2017, it was announced that the guest cast for the episode would include James Remar as Frank Gordon, and H. Foley as Winston Peters.

== Reception ==
=== Viewers ===
The episode was watched by 2.99 million viewers with a 1.0/4 share among adults aged 18 to 49, which is a new series low. This was a 14% decrease in viewership from the previous episode, which was watched by 3.46 million viewers with a 1.1/4 in the 18-49 demographics. With this rating, Gotham ranked first for FOX, beating APB, fourth on its timeslot and fourth for the night behind a rerun of The Big Bang Theory, Dancing with the Stars, and The Voice.

The episode was the 59th most watched for the week in terms of viewership.

=== Critical response ===
Professional ratings
Review scores
Source	Rating
Rotten Tomatoes (Tomatometer)	100%
Rotten Tomatoes (Average Score)	9.0
IGN	8.0
TV Fanatic	5.0/5.0 stars
TV Overmind	4.0/5.0 stars

"Heroes Rise: How the Riddler Got His Name" received mostly positive reviews from critics. The episode received a rating of 88% with an average score of 8.67 out of 10 on the review aggregator Rotten Tomatoes.

Matt Fowler of IGN gave the episode a "great" 8.0 out of 10 and wrote in his verdict, "Gotham took a break after its Jerome arc and returned with a fun installment focusing on the official birth of Edward Nygma's Riddler persona - a tale that smartly used the underutilized Lucius as Edward's foil."

Nick Hogan of TV Overmind gave the episode a 4 star rating out of 5, writing "Overall, this premiere episode was tight, focused, and immediately addressed some of the cliff-hangers from the 'winter finale' in January. More than anything, it has sparked my curiosity about what's to come, but all told it was wonderful having Gotham back on my screen." Amanda Bell of EW gave the episode a "B+" and wrote, "The content of Nygma's riddles was paralleled not just by his own experience coming into his big badness, but also in the episode's other two story lines. 514A is, obviously, a literal reflection of Bruce Wayne, and the loneliness referred to in the first riddle applies to both Nygma and Gordon. Gordon's quest for truth and family, compounded by his current isolation, makes him vulnerable to Frank’s ploy right now — if that's what it actually is. For a segment devoted to such a cunning wordsmith, this episode quite nicely sticks to its metaphors throughout. Well played."

Vinnie Mancuso of New York Observer wrote, "Straight up, this episode as a whole is terribly paced ... But underneath the mess episode writer Megan Mostyn-Brown has a ton of genuinely clever fun with Eddie and Oswald's relationship." Lisa Babick of TV Fanatic gave the series a perfect 5 star rating out of 5, writing "Gotham hit it out of the park this hour not only by giving us The Riddler but also by setting up other exciting storylines to take us through the rest of the season." Robert Yanis, Jr. of Screenrant wrote, "Now that Ed has finally claimed his villainous identity, let's retire 'Ed' from now on. Smith is now essentially playing 'Riddler' going forward. Let’s just hope Riddler is ready for Penguin's revenge, as improbable as his survival is anyway."

Kayti Burt of Den of Geek wrote, "Gotham is back! The midseason premiere is a strong start for the second half of season three, showing the further evolution of Ed into the Riddler. In terms of plot, it was less successful than some of the other Riddler-centric episodes we've gotten in the past, but nothing matched its insight into Ed's motivations as we saw him struggle to come to terms with his identity after killing — or, as we now know, attempting to kill — Oswald." MaryAnn Sleasman of TV Guide wrote, "'How the Riddler Got His Name' was an occasionally zany, occasionally touching, and completely satisfying baptism of crazy that saw the final transition from tortured killer-nerd Ed Nygma (Cory Michael Smith) to The Riddler"
