= Ghosts (Gotham) =

- Gotham episode
- Episode no.: Season 3 Episode 12
- Directed by: Eagle Egilsson
- Written by: Danny Cannon
- Cinematography by: Christopher Norr
- Editing by: Sarah C. Reeves
- Production code: T13.19912
- Original air date: January 16, 2017
- Running time: 42 minutes

Guest appearances
- Cameron Monaghan as Jerome Valeska; John Doman as Carmine Falcone; Paul Reubens as Elijah Van Dahl; Ivana Miličević as Maria Kyle; David Dastmalchian as Dwight Pollard; Jan Maxwell as Margaret Hearst; PJ Marshall as Cole Clemons; Dave Quay as Tarquin Stemmel; Brian McManamon as Basil Karlo; Anthony Carrigan as Victor Zsasz

Episode chronology
← Previous "Beware the Green-Eyed Monster"	Next → "Smile Like You Mean It"
- Gotham season 3

"Ghosts" (also known as "Mad City: Ghosts") is the twelfth episode and mid-season premiere of the third season, and 56th episode overall from the Fox series Gotham. The episode was written by executive producer Danny Cannon and directed by Eagle Egilsson. It was first broadcast on January 16, 2017.

In the episode, after Mario's funeral, Falcone places a hit on Gordon for his murder while also complicating Gordon's relationship with Lee, who continues seeing him as a murderer. Meanwhile, a morgue employee is revealed to be conspiring to bring Jerome Valeska back to life as part of his cult. Also, the arrival of Selina's mother could shake things up between Bruce and Selina while Cobblepot begins to have strange events occurring to him while on his way to the most important interview he may have.

The episode received generally positive reviews, with critics praising the tone and set-up for the next episodes.

== Plot ==
While Falcone (John Doman) and Lee (Morena Baccarin) attend Mario's funeral, Gordon (Ben McKenzie) tries to enter but is stopped by Bullock (Donal Logue), who states that Falcone may want him dead if he ever sees him. While they leave, Falcone watches Gordon from a distance. Meanwhile, Cobblepot (Robin Lord Taylor) attends a press conference programmed by his deputy chief of staff, Tarquin. After the press leaves, Tarquin Stemmel (Dave Quay) informs Cobblepot that he arranged an interview with Margaret Hearst (Jan Maxwell), an interviewer who can take "his legacy on a national scale". After Hearst leaves, Cobblepot sees his father Elijah Van Dahl (Paul Reubens) in the hallway.

Returning to his apartment, Gordon finds Zsasz (Anthony Carrigan) waiting for him as a "messenger". He states that Gordon messed it up, and it's only a matter of time before Falcone dispatches him to kill Gordon. At Selina's (Camren Bicondova) place, Selina confronts Maria (Ivana Miličević) for abandoning her. Maria tries to explain her reason but Selina refuses to acknowledge it and makes her leave. At the GCPD, Fox (Chris Chalk) shows Gordon and Bullock the corpse of a girl who was found undressed on the train tracks and died on her way to the hospital. Fox states that before she appeared, the marks signal an electrical current on her but the weird part is that three days ago, she was stabbed and taken to the morgue and yet she appeared the night before. Lee confronts Gordon in the GCPD after unsuccessfully demanding his arrest and claims that he's the "real virus" for entering into people's lives and destroying them.

In Dahl Manor, Cobblepot wakes up in the night to encounter Dahl's spirit, who wants to help him. Cobblepot is then informed by the police that someone dug up Dahl's corpse. Gordon and Bullock go to the morgue to ask the night manager, Dwight Pollard (David Dastmalchian) about the revived corpse. Dwight claims that nothing weird has happened on the morgue and is shocked to discover the corpse gone but Gordon notices a bloody smiley on his clothes. They decide to follow Dwight after discovering that he worked at Indian Hill. Maria arrives at Wayne Manor where she brings a box that intended to give to Selina, but Bruce (David Mazouz) decides to bring it to her. Selina opens the box to find all her belongings when she was young and she forgives Maria. Falcone meets with Lee, who claims that Gordon is the only one responsible and Falcone is the only one to ever kill him. Falcone decides to have him killed but makes Lee know that this will affect her too.

Gordon and Bullock follow Dwight to an abandoned theater where a crowd of acolytes had gathered. He makes a speech where he criticize the systems that have spread around the city and that Jerome Valeska (Cameron Monaghan) is the only person who stood up against it and presents footage of the massacre at the GCPD. Gordon and Bullock interrupt the presentation but the cult fends them off so Dwight can escape. While leaving, Gordon is attacked by Zsasz and his henchwomen. He flees to a restaurant kitchen where he kills the henchwomen and knocks Zsasz out. Back in Dahl Manor, Cobblepot is again visited by Dahl, who states that he cannot rest until he lies underground again and that Isabella is on the other side with him and trusts him not to trust "the birthday boy".

Lee visits Barnes (Michael Chiklis) in Arkham Asylum to discuss the virus. Barnes claims that he felt "clearer, stronger and focused" and also claims that the virus is not a disease but an antidote. His behavior prompts Lee to believe that Mario may have not lived healthy with it. The next day, Cobblepot finds Tarquin getting welcomed with a birthday party, finally seeing him as the "birthday boy". He breaks into his office and discovers Dahl's corpse. Tarquin enters and Cobblepot kills him just when he is called for the interview. During the interview, Cobblepot is again confronted by Dahl and leaves the interview, insulting the people of Gotham in the process. He returns to Tarquin's office to find his body and Dahl's corpse gone. Gordon and Bullock are again attacked in his apartment by Zsasz until Falcone arrives and calls off the hit as Lee convinced him to drop it. However, he is still angry at Gordon for murdering Mario.

Nygma (Cory Michael Smith) is revealed to be behind Cobblepot's conspiracy, using Basil Karlo (Brian McManamon) as Dahl and then make him lose control. They meet with Barbara (Erin Richards) and Tabitha (Jessica Lucas) where Nygma claims that he wants a "slow painful death. One of a thousand deep cuts" for Cobblepot so they can take his empire. Alfred (Sean Pertwee) takes Maria to a hotel, where she kisses him in gratitude. Maria finds a man, Cole Clemons (PJ Marshall) in the room, who demands the money she owed. Selina enters and accidentally says Bruce's name, which makes Cole decide to pay him a visit later. Meanwhile, Dwight reunites with a doctor, claiming that they need to move forward to bring Jerome back. The final scene shows corpses in cryogenic pods stored in a warehouse and Jerome's body is shown, still smiling and with his death mark.

== Production ==
=== Development ===
In December 2016, it was announced that the twelfth episode of the season will be titled "Ghosts" and was to be written by Danny Cannon and directed by Eagle Egilsson.

=== Casting ===
Drew Powell, Maggie Geha and Benedict Samuel don't appear in the episode as their respective characters. In December 2016, it was announced that the guest cast for the episode would include Ivana Milicevic as Maria Kyle, Paul Reubens as Elijah Van Dahl, Cameron Monaghan as Jerome Valeska, John Doman as Carmine Falcone, David Dastmalchian as Dwight Pollard, PJ Marshall as Cole Clemons, Jan Maxwell as Margaret Hearst, and Dave Quay as Tarquin. Dastmalchian's casting caused curiosity on the media as he previously portrayed Thomas Schiff on The Dark Knight in a role that was nearly the same as his role in the series.

== Reception ==
=== Viewers ===
The episode was watched by 3.69 million viewers with a 1.2/4 share among adults aged 18 to 49. This was a 9% increase in viewership from the previous episode, which was watched by 3.37 million viewers with a 1.0/3 in the 18-49 demographics. With this rating, Gotham ranked second for FOX, behind Lucifer but beating Lucifer in the 18-49 demographics, fourth on its timeslot and seventh for the night behind The New Celebrity Apprentice, Scorpion, 2 Broke Girls, Man with a Plan, Kevin Can Wait, and The Bachelor.

The episode ranked as the 56th most watched show on the week. With Live+7 DVR viewing factored in, the episode was watched by 5.31 million viewers and had an overall rating of 1.9 in the 18–49 demographic.

=== Critical reviews ===
Professional ratings
Review scores
Source	Rating
Rotten Tomatoes (Tomatometer)	75%
Rotten Tomatoes (Average Score)	7.3
IGN	6.4
TV Fanatic	3.5/5.0 stars
TV Overmind	4.5/5.0 stars

"Mad City: Ghosts" received generally positive reviews from critics. The episode received a rating of 71% with an average score of 7.3 out of 10 on the review aggregator Rotten Tomatoes.

Matt Fowler of IGN gave the episode an "okay" 6.4 out of 10 and wrote in his verdict, "'Ghosts' was a sort of a bust save for the rising threat of Jerome's return. Lee, even with all she'd recently been through, behaved in an extremely uncharacteristic manner throughout the bulk of this one, almost flipping switches as fast as Barbara did back in the second half of Season 1."

Nick Hogan of TV Overmind gave the series a 4.5 star rating out of 5, writing "Even the parts that didn't really work cooked and sizzled for Gotham this week, and everyone was at the top of their game. Harvey was classic Harvey, Lee was emotional but thoughtful, and every fight scene left me wanting more. Most of these stories have plenty of great material that should keep this season fresh and thrilling." Sage Young of EW stated: "A lot of problems could be avoided if Bruce ever remembered he has a fortress under his house."

Lisa Babick from TV Fanatic, gave a 3.5 star rating out of 5, stating: "I wasn't a fan of Penguin's complacency, but for him to overreact the way he did was just a little overboard. He didn't even listen to the guy, AND he had that big interview. Being mayor was very important to him, so it's hard to believe he'd throw it away so easily. As far as Selina's story, I am not invested one bit in her mother's return. I can only imagine that she is somehow involved with the Court. If not, who really cares then? What is interesting, though, is what's in the middle of the owl to cause it to glow the way it did." Vinnie Mancuso of New York Observer wrote, "Oh, we also get a development on The Court of Owls; the statue Bruce Wayne stole in 'Beware the Green-Eyed Monster,' when exposed to light, projects a map onto the wall. Hopefully, for the sake of Sean Pertwee, David Mazouz and Cameron Bicondova, the X at the center marks a more interesting storyline than Catwoman's drifter mom owing some sweaty guy money."

Karmen Fox of The Baltimore Sun wrote, "Minor plot holes and repetitive themes aside, 'Mad City: Ghosts' was an entertaining start to the second half of Gotham Season 3. Jim Gordon is still the reason everyone's lives are ruined, another villain is brought back from the dead, and Penguin is a volatile, deranged murder. Business as usual." Sydney Bucksbaum of Nerdist wrote, "It's commonplace for an episode of any hourlong TV drama to engage in multiple storylines at the same time. But Gotham did what few shows have accomplished and juggled five–read it: five-different storylines in its winter premiere. 'Mad City: Ghosts' picked up where the fall finale left off, but instead of delaying certain storylines for later episodes, Gotham went balls to the wall and just included all of them."

Robert Yanis Jr. of Screenrant wrote, "For its first episode of the 2017, Gotham certainly didn't disappoint. This week's spring premiere — titled 'Ghosts' (more on the significance of that later) — holds tightly to the narrative development promised by the show's previous episode." Kayti Burt of Den of Geek wrote, "Gotham is back and it continues to stumble through the middle of its season. There were a few things to like here — Ghosts saw the return of some popular faces in Paul Reubens (Penguin's dad) and Cameron Monaghan (Jerome) — but, for the most part, the midseason premiere was a predictable slog through plot mechanics we've seen on this show."
