= Time Bomb (Gotham) =

- Gotham episode
- Episode no.: Season 3 Episode 10
- Directed by: Hanelle M. Culpepper
- Written by: Robert Hull
- Cinematography by: Christopher Norr
- Editing by: Leland Sexton
- Production code: T13.19910
- Original air date: November 21, 2016
- Running time: 43 minutes

Guest appearances
- John Doman as Carmine Falcone; James Carpinello as Mario Calvi; Leslie Hendrix as Kathryn; Costa Ronin as Luka Volk

Episode chronology
← Previous "The Executioner"	Next → "Beware the Green-Eyed Monster"
- Gotham season 3

"Time Bomb" (also known as "Mad City: Time Bomb") is the tenth episode of the third season, and 54th episode overall from the Fox series Gotham. The episode was written by co-executive producer Robert Hull and directed by Hanelle M. Culpepper. It was first broadcast on November 21, 2016. In the episode, a car explodes during Mario's and Lee's rehearsal dinner and this causes Falcone to go with Gordon to find out the culprit, discovering it's someone he has previously dealt with. Meanwhile, Nygma captures Butch and Tabitha, planning on torturing them as he believes that Butch killed Isabella while Barbara hurries to find them. Bruce, Selina, Alfred and Ivy are pursued by the known assassins but discover something else about the Court.

The episode received positive reviews, with critics praising the dark tone and the build-up to the midseason finale.

== Plot ==
Ivy uses her poison to control Alfred's mind and escape. Bruce learns about the "Whisper Gang" after the key is out to destroy the secret council, a.k.a. the Court of Owls and is therefore not his enemy. Soon after, the Court enforcer kills the Gang leader. When Mario is targeted by assassins, Falcone deduces that the Court is responsible and successfully blackmails them into ceasing their attack, not learning their motives, however. Nygma kidnaps and tortures Butch and Tabitha before discovering that they are not responsible for Isabella's death, but not before forcing Tabitha to choose between her right hand and Butch's life, choosing the latter. Nygma allows them to go to the hospital. After investigating the matter, Barbara realizes Cobblepot killed Isabella and plans to use the truth to stage a power grab. Gordon says a romantic goodbye to Lee before her upcoming wedding to Mario. When Mario sees her leaving Gordon's, he bursts into a fit of rage and exhibits symptoms of the Tetch virus.

== Production ==
=== Development ===
In November 2016, it was announced that the tenth episode of the season will be titled "Time Bomb" and was to be written by Robert Hull and directed by Hanelle M. Culpepper.

=== Casting ===
Benedict Samuel and Michael Chiklis don't appear in the episode as their respective characters. In November 2016, it was announced that the guest cast for the episode would include James Carpinello as Mario Calvi, Leslie Hendrix as Kathryn, John Doman as Carmine Falcone, and Costa Ronin as Luka Volk.

== Reception ==
=== Viewers ===
The episode was watched by 3.44 million viewers with a 1.1/4 share among adults aged 18 to 49. This was a 6% decrease in viewership from the previous episode, which was watched by 3.63 million viewers with a 1.2/4 in the 18-49 demographics. With this rating, Gotham ranked second for FOX, behind Lucifer but beating Lucifer in 18-49 demographics, fourth on its timeslot and eighth for the night behind Timeless, Scorpion, Man with a Plan, 2 Broke Girls, Kevin Can Wait, Dancing with the Stars, and The Voice.

With Live+7 DVR viewing factored in, the episode was watched by 5.50 million viewers and had an overall rating of 2.0 in the 18–49 demographic.

=== Critical reception ===
Professional ratings
Review scores
Source	Rating
Rotten Tomatoes (Tomatometer)	100%
Rotten Tomatoes (Average Score)	8.3
IGN	7.2
TV Fanatic	4.5/5.0 stars
TV Overmind	4.0/5.0 stars

"Mad City: Time Bomb" received positive reviews from critics. The episode received a rating of 100% with an average score of 8.3 out of 10 on the review aggregator Rotten Tomatoes.

Matt Fowler of IGN gave the episode a "good" 7.2 out of 10 and wrote in his verdict, "'Time Bomb' wasn't a great episode, but it did use just about every Gotham performer in a meaningful way. This was a set-up chapter, leading us up to the oncoming midseason finale. Jim will battle an infected Mario for Lee while the Court rises up and dominates multiple storylines. Nygma, hopefully, will stop being so un-Riddler like and figure out just who the real betrayer is. Though if that does happen, Barbara will lose her leverage over Penguin. Still, if pressed, it'd probably be better to have Ed get his groove back."

Nick Hogan of TV Overmind gave the series a star rating of 4 out of 5, writing "This was an enjoyable episode, and it set the stage nicely for what should be an even better fall finale episode. With all of this meat in the story, surely Gotham will still be a 'Mad City' in 2017."

Sage Young of EW gave the episode a "B+" and stated: "While the cat's away, the mice will play. And while Gotham City's stringent police chief is locked up raving in Arkham, an opportunity presents itself. Word of Chief Barnes' condition spreads quickly through the city, and plans that were perhaps on hold are set in motion. Penguin hosts a meeting of the five families at the mansion and proposes a steep increase in protection fees. The decrease in law and order makes half of Gotham vulnerable and the other half more than happy to take quick and lucrative advantage of that vulnerability."

Lisa Babick from TV Fanatic, gave a 4.5 star rating out of 5, stating: "I can't imagine what could possibly be in the safe that could destroy the Court of Owls. You'd think that as powerful as they are that they would have gotten rid of whatever it is by now. How convenient for the future Batman to have this piece of information and the key to unlock it all. Will he destroy them this season or will it wait until he dons his cape and cowl?" Vinnie Mancuso of New York Observer wrote, "Well, surprise surprise, it turns out you can't even get engaged to the son of a notorious crime boss in Gotham City anymore without having to worry about him getting infected with magical carnie blood and turning into a hulking rage-monster. Gentrification is a bitch, man. Or should I say Tetch-rification?"

Robert Yanis, Jr. of Screenrant wrote, "Bruce and Selina's discovery regarding the Court of Owls has re-energized what many assumed would be the major thrust of the season but which has taken a backseat ever since Bruce made a truce with the secret organization earlier this season." Kayti Burt of Den of Geek gave a 4 star rating out of 5 and wrote, "'Time Bomb' was a particularly bloody episode of Gotham, but it balanced the gore by tying together multiple plotlines in satisfying ways. Though, in many ways, 'Time Bomb' felt like a transitionary ep — Mario and Lee race closer to the altar, Bruce and Selina discuss their relationship, the noose tightens on Oswald's secret — it was elegantly told. Something Gotham can't often boast."
