= Domińczyk =

Domińczyk/ Dominczyk/ Dominchyk/ Dominchuk is a Polish surname. Notable people with the name include:

- Dagmara Domińczyk (born 1976), Polish-born American actress
- John Dominczyk, character from 2014 crime drama film A Most Violent Year
- Marika Domińczyk (born 1980), Polish-born American actress
- Mirosław Domińczyk (1953–2023), Polish Solidarity activist
- Veronika Domińczyk (born 1986), Polish-American actress and sister of Dagmara Domińczyk
