= Patrick Wilson =

American actor (born 1973)

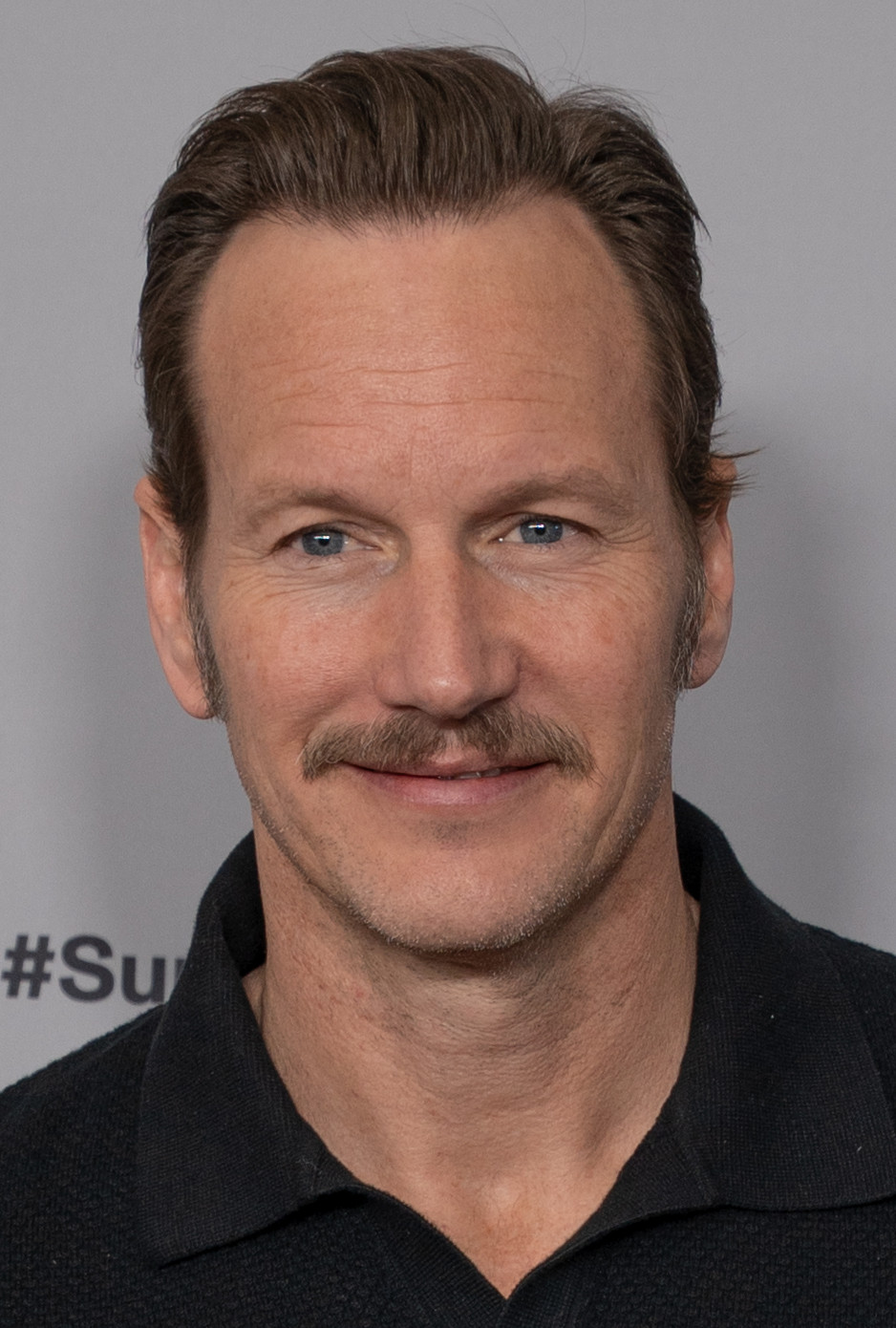
- Wilson in 2026
- Born: Patrick Joseph Wilson; July 3, 1973 (age 53); Norfolk, Virginia, U.S.
- Education: Carnegie Mellon University (BFA)
- Occupations: Actor; director; producer
- Years active: 1995–present
- Spouse: Dagmara Domińczyk (m. 2005)
- Children: 2
- Relatives: Marika Domińczyk (sister-in-law); Scott Foley (brother-in-law)

Patrick Joseph Wilson (born July 3, 1973) is an American actor. He began his career in 1995, starring in Broadway musicals. He received nominations for three Tony Awards, two for his roles in The Full Monty (2000–2001) and Oklahoma! (2002) and the third one as a producer of the musical The Lost Boys (2026). He co-starred in the HBO miniseries Angels in America (2003), for which he was nominated for a Golden Globe Award and a Primetime Emmy Award.

Wilson appeared in films such as The Alamo (2004), The Phantom of the Opera (2004), Hard Candy (2005), Little Children (2006), Watchmen (2009), and The A-Team (2010). He gained wider recognition for his starring role in the Insidious film series (2010–2023) and as Ed Warren in The Conjuring universe (2013–present), earning him a Scream king title. He made his directorial debut with the sequel Insidious: The Red Door (2023).

On television, Wilson starred in the CBS drama series A Gifted Man (2011–2012) and as Lou Solverson in the second season of FX's anthology series Fargo (2015), for which he received critical acclaim and a second Golden Globe nomination. In the DC Extended Universe, he played Ocean Master in Aquaman (2018) and Aquaman and the Lost Kingdom (2023).

== Early life ==
Patrick Joseph Wilson was born the youngest of three boys in Norfolk, Virginia, on July 3, 1973, the son of voice teacher and singer Mary Kathryn Wilson and WTVT news anchor John Franklin Wilson. He has two older brothers: Paul, an advertising executive, and Mark, who succeeded their father as a WTVT news anchor. Wilson grew up in St. Petersburg, Florida, where he attended Shorecrest Preparatory School. In 1995, he graduated with a BFA in Drama from Carnegie Mellon University.

== Career ==
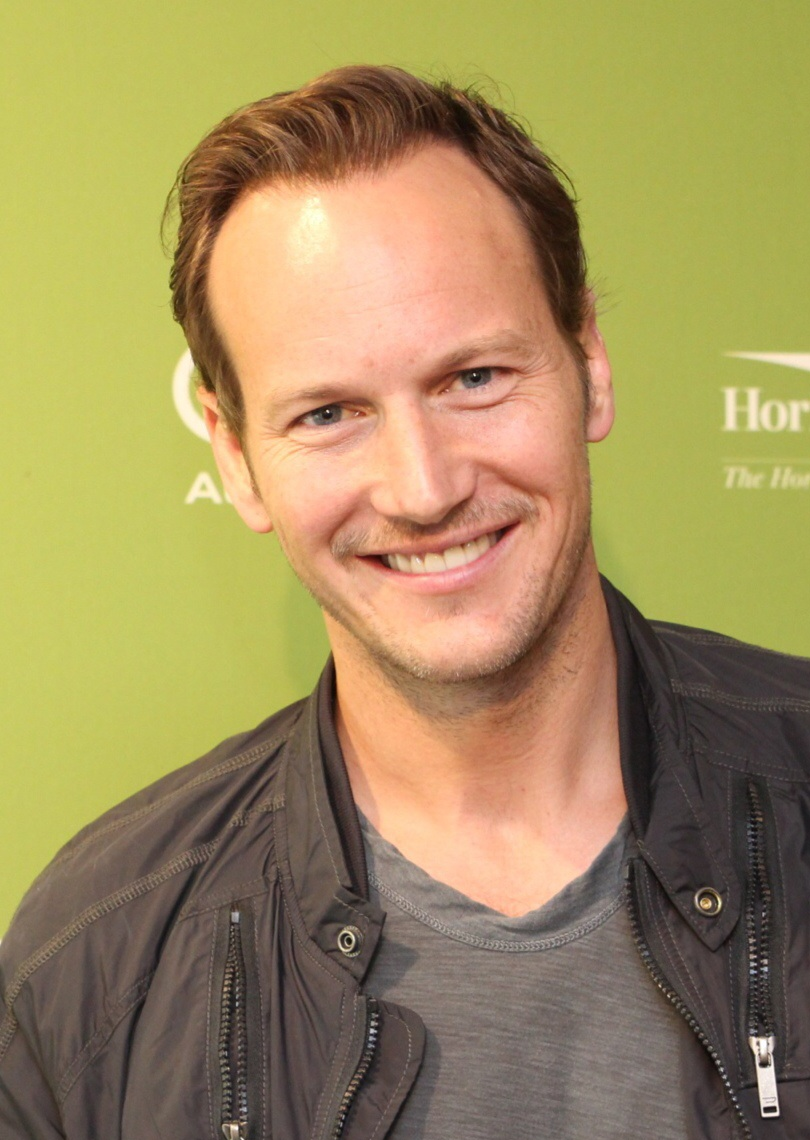
Wilson at the Montclair Film Festival in May 2014

=== Early stage and TV work ===
In 1995, Wilson made his acting debut as an understudy in the role of Chris Scott in the national touring production of Miss Saigon. The following year, he portrayed Billy Bigelow in the national tour of Carousel. In 1999, he starred as Jamie Conway in the off-Broadway production of Bright Lights, Big City, and Wilson later made his Broadway theatre debut in The Full Monty (2000), portraying Jerry Lukowski. For his performance in the role, he was nominated for the Tony Award for Best Actor in a Musical and the Drama Desk Award for Outstanding Actor in a Musical.

Circa 2000, Wilson completed work on the film My Sister's Wedding, which has never been released. He sang "On the Street Where You Live" from My Fair Lady for Julie Andrews' awards ceremony when she received the Kennedy Center Honors in 2001. In 2002, his performance as Curly McLain in the Broadway production of Oklahoma! received critical acclaim, with Wilson being nominated for the Tony Award for Best Actor in a Musical and the Drama Desk Award for Outstanding Actor in a Musical for the second time each. He won critical acclaim for his performance as the closeted Mormon Republican Joe Pitt in Mike Nichols' 2003 HBO drama miniseries Angels in America, receiving nominations for both the Golden Globe Award for Best Supporting Actor – Series, Miniseries or Television Film and the Primetime Emmy Award for Outstanding Supporting Actor in a Miniseries or a Movie.

=== Early film work ===
In 2004, Wilson made his first film appearance in The Alamo, playing William B. Travis. That same year, he co-starred in the musical film The Phantom of the Opera as Viscount Raoul de Chagny. The following year, he starred alongside Elliot Page in the psychological thriller film Hard Candy, portraying a pedophile named Jeff Kohlver.

In 2006, Wilson starred as Brad Adamson in Todd Field's Little Children. Also in 2006, he appeared in the Golden Globe Award-nominated Running with Scissors as Michael Shephard, which was directed by Ryan Murphy and produced by Brad Pitt. In 2007, he starred as Brian Callahan in the independent film Purple Violets, which was written and directed by Edward Burns. In 2008, he starred in Neil LaBute's Lakeview Terrace.

Wilson played Dan Dreiberg / Nite Owl II in Zack Snyder's 2009 film adaptation of the graphic novel Watchmen, gaining 25 pounds for the role after filming flashback scenes as the slimmer Nite Owl II. This film reunited Wilson with his Little Children co-star, Jackie Earle Haley. On October 19, 2010, in Yankee Stadium, he sang "God Bless America" during the seventh-inning stretch of Game 4 of the American League Championship Series between the Texas Rangers and the New York Yankees. On November 20, 2010, in Yankee Stadium, he sang the United States National Anthem before the first football game in the new stadium, played between Army and Notre Dame.

=== International breakthrough ===
Wilson played the primary antagonist Lynch in 2010's The A-Team, and co-starred with Rose Byrne in James Wan's horror film Insidious. He returned for the latter film's sequel, Insidious: Chapter 2, which was released in 2013. In 2013, Wilson portrayed the paranormal investigator Ed Warren, alongside Vera Farmiga starring as his wife Lorraine, in the horror film The Conjuring. The film was critically acclaimed, becoming one of the highest grossing horror films of all time. Wilson reprised the role in the film's sequel, The Conjuring 2, released on June 10, 2016.

In January 2014, Wilson was announced to portray the lead role, Lou Solverson, in the second season of FX's anthology series Fargo. He was nominated for the 2015 Golden Globe Award for Best Actor – Miniseries or Television Film for his performance. In March 2014, Wilson was cast in an unspecified role in the Marvel Cinematic Universe film Ant-Man, but later left the film due to scheduling conflicts brought upon by multiple delays with the film's production. That same year, he was cast as Arthur O'Dwyer in the Western film Bone Tomahawk, opposite Kurt Russell and Matthew Fox.

=== Ongoing success and directorial debut ===
In 2016, he co-starred in John Lee Hancock's biopic The Founder, as Rollie Smith, based on the life of McDonald's fast food restaurants' founder Ray Kroc. In August 2016, Barbra Streisand released the album Encore: Movie Partners Sing Broadway, on which she and Wilson duet the song "Loving You" from the Stephen Sondheim musical Passion.

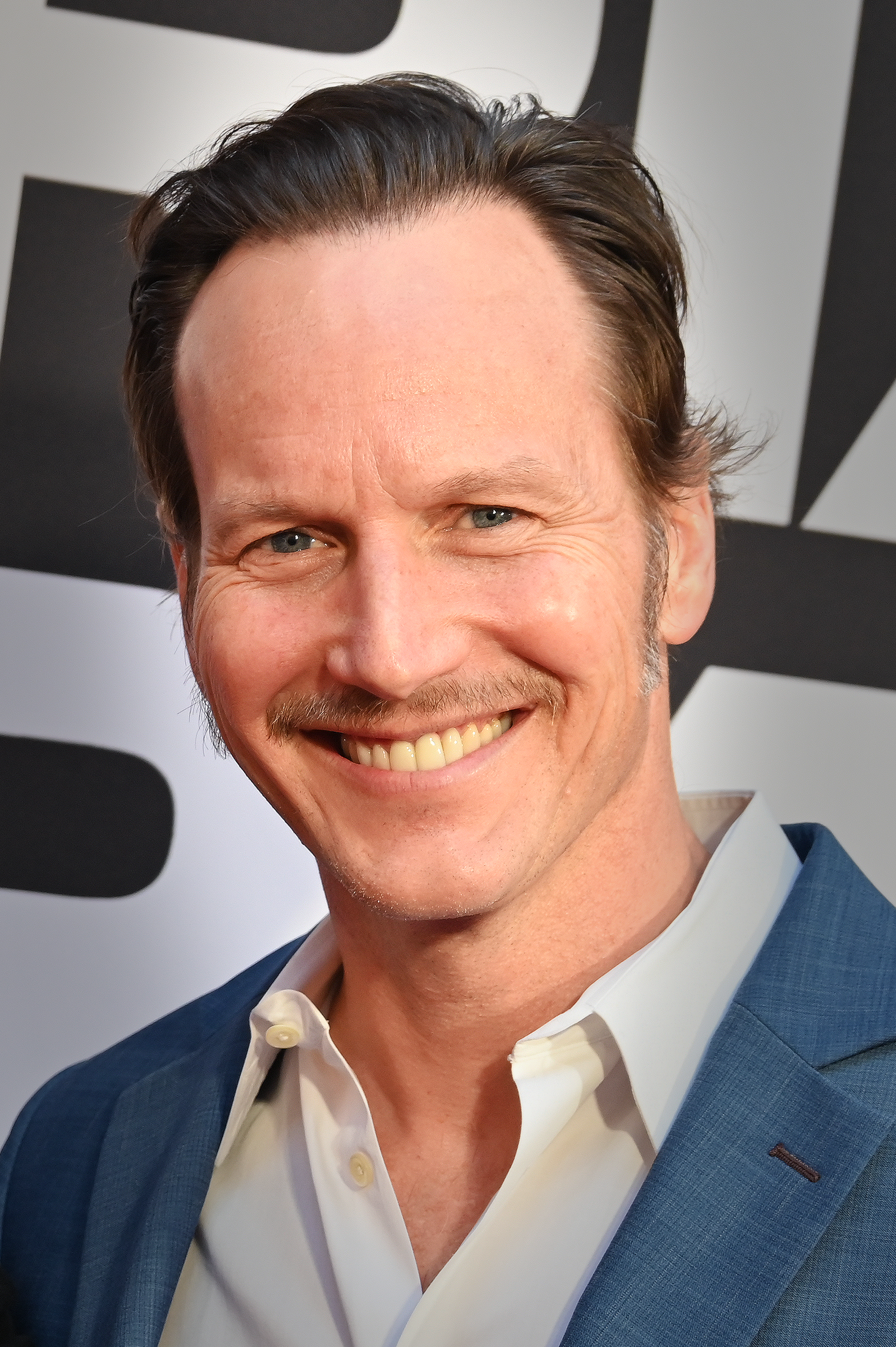
Wilson in 2025

In 2018, Wilson co-starred in Jaume Collet-Serra's action thriller The Commuter, reuniting with The Conjuring co-star Farmiga, and portraying a trusted friend of Liam Neeson's character. Also that year, he portrayed Orm Marius / Ocean Master in the DC Extended Universe film Aquaman, directed by long-time collaborator James Wan. Wilson reprised his role in the 2023 sequel film Aquaman and the Lost Kingdom.

On November 8, 2019, Roland Emmerich's World War II film Midway, was released, starring Wilson along with Ed Skrein, Mandy Moore, Luke Evans, Aaron Eckhart, Nick Jonas, Dennis Quaid and Woody Harrelson. In June 2020, Wilson signed on to Emmerich's Moonfall, which was released in 2022.

Announced in October 2020, Wilson made his directorial debut with Insidious: The Red Door, released July 7, 2023, in the US, serving as a direct sequel to Insidious: Chapter 2 with both Wilson and Ty Simpkins reprising their roles. Scott Teems wrote the script based on a story by Leigh Whannell. Whannell, James Wan, Jason Blum, and Oren Peli will produce the film. He also contributed vocals to the end credits song "Stay" on the film's soundtrack, collaborating with Swedish metal band Ghost, who he is a fan of.

In March 2026, Wilson was cast as Jerry, the father of Abby, in the third season of the HBO series The Last of Us.

== Charity work ==
In May 2012, the band VanWilson (consisting of Wilson on vocals and drums and his brothers on guitar and vocals) performed a benefit concert for Southeastern Guide Dogs' Paws For Patriots program in St. Petersburg, Florida. They raised $30,000 for the program and were honored by the organization by having puppies named after them. The brothers have also performed benefit concerts for All Children's Hospital and the St. Petersburg Free Clinic.

== Personal life ==
Wilson married Polish-American actress and fellow Carnegie Mellon alumna Dagmara Domińczyk in 2005. They have two sons, born in 2006 and 2009, and reside in Montclair, New Jersey. Patrick's younger son Kassian has appeared in a few films, including Prodigal Son as Young Malcolm, and a cameo in Insidious: The Red Door. His sister-in-law is actress Marika Domińczyk, who is married to actor and director Scott Foley.

In April 2012, Wilson gave the keynote address for his alma mater, Carnegie Mellon University, in which he spoke of his memories from childhood and through his career.

== Filmography ==
=== Film ===
List of films and roles
Year	Title	Role	Notes
2001	My Sister's Wedding	Quinn	Unreleased film
2004	The Alamo	William B. Travis	
2004	The Phantom of the Opera	Viscount Raoul de Chagny	Nominated—Satellite Award for Best Supporting Actor in a Motion Picture – Musical or Comedy
2005	Hard Candy	Jeff Kohlver	Nominated—Fangoria Chainsaw Award for Relationship from Hell (shared with Elliot Page)
2006	Tampa Bay: Living Legacy	Narrator (Voice)	Documentary film
2006	Little Children	Brad Adamson	Young Hollywood Award for Breakthrough Performance – Male; Nominated—Awards Circuit Community Award for Best Cast Ensemble; Nominated—Satellite Award for Best Actor in a Motion Picture – Drama
2006	Running with Scissors	Michael Shephard	
2007	Purple Violets	Brian Callahan	
2007	Evening	Harris Arden	
2007	Brothers Three: An American Gothic	Peter	
2008	Life in Flight	Will Sargent	
2008	Lakeview Terrace	Chris Mattson	
2008	Passengers	Eric Clark	
2009	Watchmen	Dan Dreiberg / Nite Owl II	
2010	Barry Munday	Barry Munday	
2010	The A-Team	Agent Lynch / Agent Vance Burress	
2010	The Switch	Roland Nilson	
2010	Insidious	Josh Lambert	Nominated—Scream Award for Best Horror Actor
2010	Morning Glory	Adam Bennett	
2011	The Ledge	Joe Harris	
2011	Young Adult	Buddy Slade	
2012	Prometheus	Mr. Shaw	
2013	The Conjuring	Ed Warren	Nominated—Fright Meter Award for Best Actor
2013	Insidious: Chapter 2	Josh Lambert	Nominated—Fangoria Chainsaw Award for Best Actor; Nominated—Fright Meter Award for Best Actor
2014	Jack Strong	David Forden	
2014	Space Station 76	Captain Glenn Terry	
2014	Stretch	Kevin "Stretch" Brzyzowski	
2014	Big Stone Gap	Jack MacChesney	
2014	Let's Kill Ward's Wife	David	Also producer
2015	Zipper	Sam Ellis	
2015	Home Sweet Hell	Don Champagne	
2015	Bone Tomahawk	Arthur O'Dwyer	
2016	Batman v Superman: Dawn of Justice	President of the United States (voice)	Cameo
2016	A Kind of Murder	Walter Stackhouse	
2016	The Hollow Point	Sheriff Wallace Skolkin	
2016	The Conjuring 2	Ed Warren	
2016	The Founder	Rollie Smith	
2018	The Commuter	Alex Murphy	
2018	Nightmare Cinema	Eric Sr.	
2018	The Nun	Ed Warren	Cameo
2018	Aquaman	Orm Marius / Ocean Master	Nominated—Teen Choice Award for Choice Movie Villain
2019	Annabelle Comes Home	Ed Warren	
2019	The Assistant	Famous actor	Uncredited cameo
2019	In the Tall Grass	Ross Humboldt	
2019	Midway	Edwin T. Layton	
2021	The Conjuring: The Devil Made Me Do It	Ed Warren	
2022	Moonfall	Brian Harper	
2023	Insidious: The Red Door	Josh Lambert	Also director
2023	The Nun II	Ed Warren	Cameo
2023	Aquaman and the Lost Kingdom	Orm Marius / Ocean Master	
2024	Millers in Marriage	Scott	
2025	The Conjuring: Last Rites	Ed Warren	
2025	Jay Kelly	Ben Alcock	
2026	Run Amok	Mr. Shelby	Completed

Key
†	Denotes films that have not yet been released

=== Television ===
Year	Title	Role	Notes
2003	Angels in America	Joe Pitt	6 episodes, Online Film & Television Association Award for Best Supporting Actor in a Motion Picture or Miniseries; Nominated—Golden Globe Award for Best Supporting Actor – Series, Miniseries or Television Film; Nominated—Primetime Emmy Award for Outstanding Supporting Actor in a Limited Series or Movie; Nominated—Satellite Award for Best Supporting Actor – Series, Miniseries or Television Film
2009	American Dad!	Jim (voice)	Episode: "Wife Insurance"
2011–2012	A Gifted Man	Dr. Michael Holt	16 episodes
2012, 2017	Girls	Joshua	2 episodes, Nominated—Critics' Choice Television Award for Best Guest Performer in a Comedy Series; Nominated—Gold Derby Award for Best Guest Actor in a Comedy Series
2015	Fargo	Lou Solverson	10 episodes, Nominated—Critics' Choice Television Award for Best Actor in a Movie/Miniseries; Nominated—Gold Derby Award for Best Actor in a Television Movie/Miniseries; Nominated—Golden Globe Award for Best Actor – Miniseries or Television Film; Nominated—IGN Summer Movie Award for Best Television Actor; Nominated—Saturn Award for Best Supporting Actor on Television
2019	The Other Two	Himself	Episode: "Chase Shoots a Music Video"
2022	Teen Titans Go!	Himself (voice)	Episode: "365!"
2022	Little Demon	Everette (voice)	Episode: "Everybody's Dying for the Weekend"
2026	Cape Fear	Tom Bowden	Miniseries
2027	The Last of Us †	Jerry	Recurring role (season 3)

=== Video games ===
List of video game voice roles
Year	Title	Role	Notes
2009	Watchmen: The End Is Nigh	Nite Owl II (voice)	

=== Stage ===
List of stage performances and roles
Year	Title	Role	Category	Notes
1995	The Secret Garden	Lieutenant Shaw	Regional	Pittsburgh Civic Light Opera
1995	The Most Happy Fella	Clem	Regional	Pittsburgh Civic Light Opera
1995	Cabaret	Singing Waiter	Regional	Pittsburgh Civic Light Opera
1995	Miss Saigon	Marine / Slater u/s Chris Scott	U.S. national tour	
1996	Carousel	Billy Bigelow	U.S. national tour	
1997	Lucky in the Rain	Henderson Booth	Regional	Goodspeed Musicals
1997	Harmony	Erwin "Chopin" Bootz	Regional	
1999	Bright Lights, Big City	Jamie Conway	Off-Broadway	Nominated—Drama Desk Award for Outstanding Actor in a Musical
1999	Romeo and Juliet: The Musical	Romeo	Regional	Ordway Music Theater
1999	Sweet Bird of Youth	Chance Wayne	Regional	La Jolla Playhouse
2000	Tenderloin	Tommy Howatt	Off-Broadway	Encores!
2000–2001	The Full Monty	Jerry Lukowski	Broadway	Nominated—Drama Desk Award for Outstanding Actor in a Musical; Nominated—Tony Award for Best Actor in a Musical
2002	Oklahoma!	Curly McLain	Broadway	Nominated—Drama Desk Award for Outstanding Actor in a Musical; Nominated—Tony Award for Best Actor in a Musical
2006	Barefoot in the Park	Paul Bratter	Broadway	
2008–2009	All My Sons	Chris Keller	Broadway	
2014	Guys and Dolls	Sky Masterson	Concert	Carnegie Hall
2016	White Rabbit Red Rabbit	performer	Off-Broadway	Westside Theatre
2017	Brigadoon	Tommy Albright	Off-Broadway	Special Event
2023	Gutenberg! The Musical!	Producer	Broadway	One night only
2025	Big Fish	Edward Bloom	Workshop	
2026	The Lost Boys	—N/a	Broadway	Producer; Nominated—Tony Award for Best Musical

== Audio work ==
=== Cast recordings ===
- Terrence Mann's Romeo & Juliet: The Musical from William Shakespeare (1999)
- Lucky in the Rain (2000, studio cast recording)
- Tenderloin (2000, Encores! concert cast recording)
- Dreamgirls in Concert (as film executive, 2001 concert cast recording)
- The Full Monty (2001, original Broadway cast recording)
- Bright Lights, Big City (2005, studio cast recording)
- Allegro (2009, studio cast recording)
- Brigadoon (2017, New York City Center cast recording)

=== Soundtracks ===
- The Phantom of the Opera (2004)
- Insidious: The Red Door (2023)

=== Audiobooks ===
- The Garden of Eden by Ernest Hemingway (2006) (Simon & Schuster)
- The Ruins by Scott Smith (2006) (Simon & Schuster)

=== Miscellaneous ===
- Broadway Cares: Home for the Holidays (2001 CD)
- The Dreams in You (2001 CD)
- Lucky (2004 CD) by Gary Kline
- Every Day Is a Holiday (2009 Christmas album) by Mary McBride
- Encore: Movie Partners Sing Broadway (2016 CD) by Barbra Streisand
- Stay - Ghost (2023 CD)
