= Anthony J. Carpinello =

Former justice of New York state supreme court

Anthony J. Carpinello is a former justice of the New York State Supreme Court and of the Appellate Division, Third Department.

Carpinello received a bachelor's degree from Union University in 1970 and a Juris Doctor from Albany Law School in 1973. He practiced law from 1974 to 1994 with the law firm of Muffson, Hessberg & Blumberg, later known as Hiscock & Barclay. During this period, he also served in various public service capacities, including Councilman for the Town of East Greenbush from 1975 to 1981, as a Rensselaer County legislator from 1982 to 1989, and as East Greenbush Town Justice from 1993 to 1994.

In November 1994, Carpinello was elected as a Republican to a 14-year term as a justice of the Supreme Court, Third Judicial District. He served as a trial judge in until 1996, when Governor George Pataki promoted him to the Appellate Division, Third Department, which hears appeals from all trial-level courts in 28 counties of Upstate New York. In November 2008, Carpinello was defeated in his race for reelection.

Carpinello serves as a mediator with JAMS. Since 2006, he has also served as Chair of the New York State Continuing Legal Education Board.

Carpinello is married to Sharon E. Kelly, a mental health official. They have a daughter Amy and son actor James Carpinello.
