= The Count of Monte Cristo (2002 film) =

2002 film

- Theatrical release poster
- Directed by: Kevin Reynolds
- Screenplay by: Jay Wolpert
- Based on: The Count of Monte Cristo by Alexandre Dumas
- Produced by: Gary Barber; Roger Birnbaum; Jonathan Glickman
- Starring: Jim Caviezel; Guy Pearce; Richard Harris; James Frain; Dagmara Dominczyk; Luis Guzmán
- Cinematography: Andrew Dunn
- Edited by: Stephen Semel; Christopher Womack
- Music by: Edward Shearmur
- Production companies: Touchstone Pictures; Spyglass Entertainment; Barber/Birnbaum Productions
- Distributed by: Buena Vista Pictures Distribution
- Release date: January 25, 2002 (United States)
- Running time: 131 minutes
- Countries: Ireland; United Kingdom; United States
- Language: English
- Budget: $35 million
- Box office: $75.4 million

The Count of Monte Cristo is a 2002 historical adventure film, which is an adaptation of the 1844 novel of the same name by Alexandre Dumas, produced by Roger Birnbaum, Gary Barber, and Jonathan Glickman, and directed by Kevin Reynolds. The film stars Jim Caviezel, Guy Pearce, Richard Harris, James Frain, Dagmara Dominczyk, Luis Guzmán and Henry Cavill in one of his earliest roles. It follows the general plot of the novel, with the main storyline of imprisonment and revenge preserved, but many elements, including the relationships between major characters and the ending were modified.

The Count of Monte Cristo was released in North America by Buena Vista Pictures Distribution on January 25, 2002, to generally positive reviews from critics. It was commercially successful, grossing $75 million.

== Plot ==
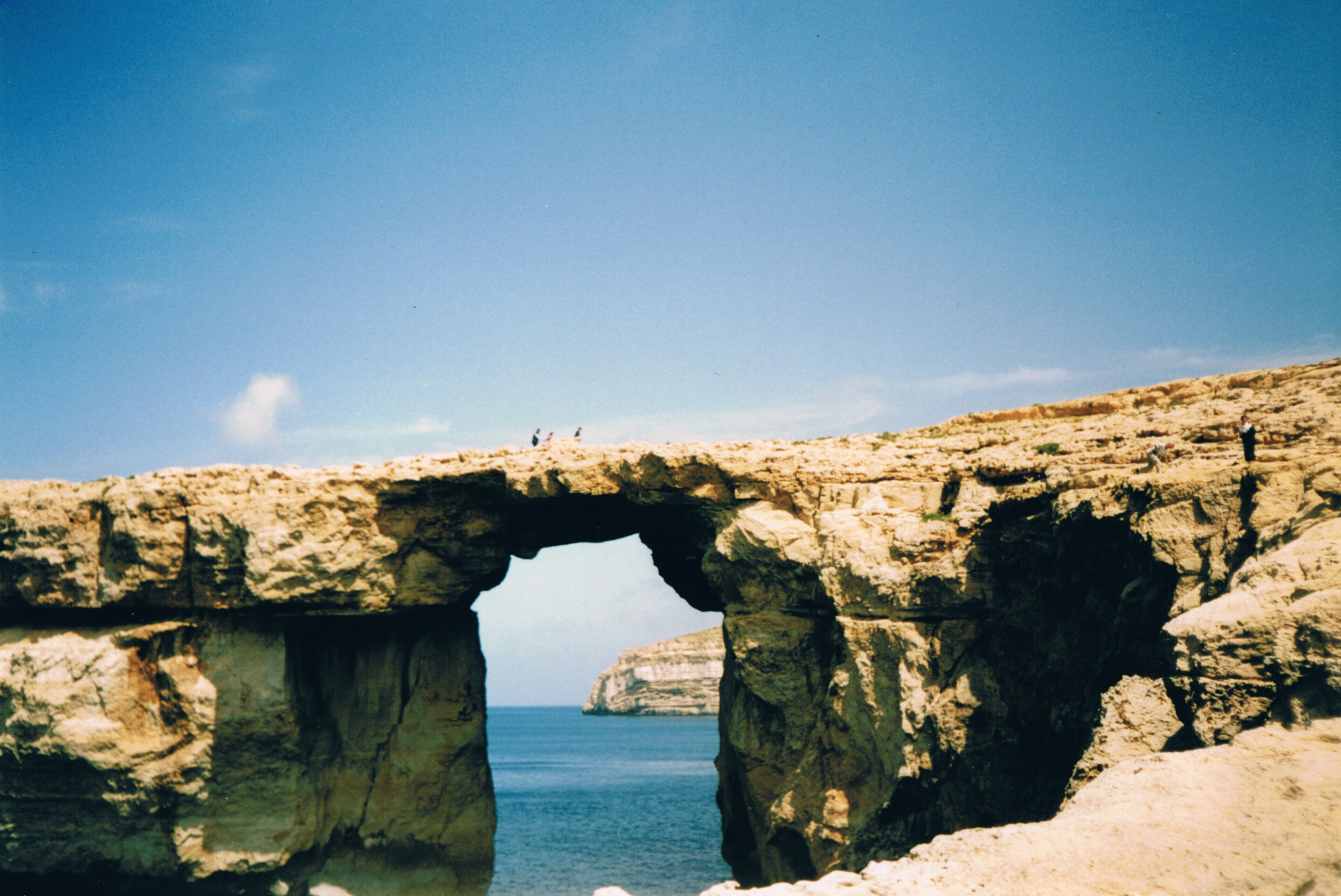
The Azure Window of Gozo appears in the background of some scenes (picture from 2003).

In 1815, Edmond Dantès, second mate of a French merchant vessel, and his friend Fernand Mondego, a representative of the shipping company, seek medical help on Elba for their ailing captain. Napoleon Bonaparte is in exile on the island. Having kept his guardians from killing the pair, Bonaparte privately requests that Edmond deliver a letter to the mainland in exchange for his physician's services. Edmond is sworn to secrecy, but Fernand witnesses the exchange. The captain dies. In Marseille, the company owner, Morrell, commends Edmond for his bravery, promoting him to captain over first mate Danglars, who had given Edmond explicit orders not to land at Elba.

Fernand lusts after Edmond's lover Mercédès and decides with Danglars to inform on Edmond regarding the letter, which reveals information that could be used to aid Bonaparte's escape from Elba. Villefort, the city's chief magistrate, has Edmond arrested. Villefort then learns that the letter is addressed to his own father Clarion, a Bonapartist. He burns the letter and orders Edmond imprisoned in the Château d'If, an island prison. Before being taken to the island, Edmond escapes and flees to Fernand, who reveals that he and Danglars were complicit in his betrayal, but is apprehended again. In exchange for persuading Mercédès that Edmond has been executed for treason and that she should take comfort in Fernand, Villefort has Fernand assassinate Clarion.

Six years later, an eruption in the ground of Edmond's cell reveals another prisoner, Abbé Faria, who has been imprisoned for eleven years after refusing to tell Bonaparte the whereabouts of the Spada family's treasure. Faria has been digging an escape tunnel, but he dug in the wrong direction and ended up in Edmond's cell. In exchange for Edmond's help digging a new tunnel, Faria educates him in several academic and martial disciplines. Faria is fatally injured in a tunnel cave-in. Before dying, he gives Edmond a map to the treasure and implores him to use it only for good. Edmond escapes the prison by taking Faria's place in the disposal of his corpse and is thrown into the sea, pulling warden Armand Dorleac along with him and drowning him.

Wading ashore, Edmond encounters a band of pirates preparing to execute one of their own, Jacopo. Their leader, Luigi Vampa, decides justice and entertainment would be better served by pitting Edmond against Jacopo in a knife fight. Edmond wins but spares Jacopo, who swears himself to Edmond for life. They both work with the pirates until they arrive in Marseille. Edmond learns from Morrell, who does not recognize him, that his father committed suicide out of grief, and that Fernand and Mercédès have wed. With Faria's map, he and Jacopo locate the treasure on the island of Montecristo. With his newfound wealth and comprehensive education, Edmond establishes himself in Parisian society as "The Count of Monte Cristo" with Jacopo as his manservant and swears vengeance on those who conspired against him.

Edmond ingratiates himself to the Mondegos by staging the kidnap and rescue of their son, Albert. He lures Fernand, Villefort, and Danglars into a trap by letting slip the notion that he has located the Spada family's lost treasure and is shipping it through Marseille. His plans result in Danglars being caught red-handed in the act of theft and Villefort being tricked into revealing his role in Clarion's death; both are arrested. Fernand is brought to financial ruin as Edmond has his gambling debts called in. Even though his appearance has changed dramatically, Edmond is recognized by Mercédès. Eventually, she softens him, and they rekindle their relationship. As Fernand prepares to flee the country, Mercédès reveals that the only reason she married him was that she was already pregnant with Albert, who is actually Edmond's son.

Edmond ambushes Fernand in the ruins of his family's country estate, having led him to believe that the treasure would be waiting for him. Albert intervenes when Edmond attempts to kill Fernand, but Mercédès tells him of his true parentage. Fernand attempts to flee but changes his mind upon realizing that he has nowhere to go and challenges Edmond to a fight to the death; Edmond prevails. Edmond purchases Château d'If, intending to raze it, but instead leaves it standing as he swears to Faria to use his fortune for good and departs with his new family.

== Cast ==
- Jim Caviezel as Edmond Dantès
- Guy Pearce as Fernand Mondego
- Richard Harris as Abbé Faria
- James Frain as J. F. Villefort
- Dagmara Domińczyk as Mercédès
- Luis Guzmán as Jacopo
- Michael Wincott as Armand Dorléac
- Henry Cavill as Albert Mondego
- Albie Woodington as Philippe Danglars
- JB Blanc as Luigi Vampa
- Alex Norton as Napoleon Bonaparte
- Patrick Godfrey as Morrell
- Freddie Jones as Clarion
- Helen McCrory as Valentina Villefort
- Christopher Adamson as Maurice

== Production ==
Most of filming took place on the island of Malta, where the capital, Valletta, stood in for Marseilles. The fortified city of Vittoriosa, part of the Grand Harbour of Valletta, was chosen for its strong resemblance to early 19th century Port of Marseilles. The waterfront stretch of Vittoriosa known as Xatt Ir-Risq and Fort St Elmo featured specifically in the Marseilles scenes. The Grand Harbour had the added advantage of being one of a very few ports deep enough to allow the huge period sailing ships brought from the UK to dock. Saint Mary's Tower on the island of Comino was used for the exteriors of the Château d'If; the Azure Window of Gozo also makes an appearance in the scenes set on the island of Montecristo.

In Ireland locations included Powerscourt Estate, which stood in for the estate that Dantès buys and where he hosts his grand introduction to Paris society, and Kilruddery House appears as Mondego's home early in the film. The climactic fight scene between Dantès and Mondego was filmed near Slane, in County Meath.

== Release ==
=== Home media ===
The Count of Monte Cristo was released on VHS and DVD on September 10, 2002. The latter release of the film is THX certified, featuring behind-the-scenes footage, audio commentary, deleted scenes and other bonus materials.

== Reception ==
On Rotten Tomatoes the film holds an approval rating of 74% based on 142 reviews, with an average rating of 6.7/10. The website's critics consensus reads: "Though it may not reach for any new artistic heights, The Count of Monte Cristo is an old-fashioned yet enjoyable swashbuckler." At Metacritic, the film has a weighted average score of 61 out of 100, based on 33 critics, indicating "generally favourable reviews". Audiences polled by CinemaScore gave the film an average grade of "A" on an A+ to F scale.

Roger Ebert gave the film 3 stars out of 4, writing: "The Count of Monte Cristo is a movie that incorporates piracy, Napoleon in exile, betrayal, solitary confinement, secret messages, escape tunnels, swashbuckling, comic relief, a treasure map, Parisian high society and sweet revenge, and brings it in at under two hours, with performances by good actors who are clearly having fun. This is the kind of adventure picture the studios churned out in the Golden Age—so traditional it almost feels new." Marc Salov of The Austin Chronicle said, "More fun than Peter Hyams' The Musketeer, and somewhat less so than The Man in the Iron Mask, this is middling Dumas all the way."

== Soundtrack ==
The Count of Monte Cristo OST

Soundtrack album by Edward Shearmur
- Released: January 25, 2002
- Recorded: 2001
- Genre: Soundtrack
- Length: 53:03
- Label: RCA

The official soundtrack for the film was composed and conducted by Edward Shearmur and performed by the London Metropolitan Orchestra.

Professional ratings
Review scores
Source	Rating
SoundtrackNet	link
