= Broadway Cares: Home for the Holidays =

Compilation album by various artists
- Released: December 4, 2001
- Genre: Christmas
- Length: 59:16
- Label: Centaur Records
- Producers: Marc Shaiman; Nick De Baise; Tony Moran; Warren Rigg

Professional ratings
Review scores
Source	Rating
AllMusic	3/5 stars

Broadway Cares: Home for the Holidays is a compilation holiday album by various artists, released on December 4, 2001 via Centaur Entertainment, Inc.

== Track listing ==
No.	Title	Writer(s)	Producer(s)	Length
1.	"Baby, It's Cold Outside" (performed by Liza Minnelli and Alan Cumming)	Frank Loesser	Tony Moran; Nick De Baise	3:54
2.	"Have Yourself a Merry Little Christmas" (performed by Christine Ebersole)	Hugh Martin; Ralph Blane	Tony Moran; Nick De Baise	3:35
3.	"Santa Baby" (performed by Jane Krakowski)	Joan Javits; Philip Springer; Tony Springer	Marc Shaiman	3:43
4.	"Merry Christmas Darling" (performed by Sam Harris)	Richard Carpenter; Frank Pooler	Tony Moran; Nick De Baise	4:51
5.	"O Holy Night" (performed by Liz Callaway and Ann Hampton Callaway)	Adolphe Adam; John Sullivan Dwight	Tony Moran; Nick De Baise	3:17
6.	"Peace on Earth/Little Drummer Boy" (performed by Anthony Rapp and Everett Bradley)	Ian Fraser; Larry Grossman; Alan W. Kohan; Katherine Kennicott Davis; Harry Simeone; Henry Onorati	Tony Moran; Nick De Baise	3:30
7.	"Silent Night" (performed by Lillias White)	Franz Xaver Gruber; Joseph Mohr	Tony Moran	4:27
8.	"New York State of Mind" (performed by Adam Pascal)	Billy Joel	Tony Moran; Nick De Baise	5:06
9.	"Feliz Navidad" (performed by Daphne Rubin-Vega)	José Feliciano	Tony Moran; Warren Rigg	4:34
10.	"Christmas Time Is Here" (performed by Billy Porter)	Vince Guaraldi; Lee Mendelson	Marc Shaiman; Billy Porter	4:33
11.	"Sleigh Ride" (performed by Lea DeLaria)	Leroy Anderson; Mitchell Parish	Nick De Baise	1:54
12.	"We Need a Little Christmas" (performed by Patrick Wilson)	Jerry Herman	Tony Moran; Nick De Baise	1:22
13.	"Chestnuts Roasting on an Open Fire" (performed by Davis Gaines)	Mel Tormé; Robert Wells	Nick De Baise	2:38
14.	"Silver Bells" (performed by Gary Beach and Roger Bart)	Jay Livingston; Ray Evans	Tony Moran; Nick De Baise	3:16
15.	"I'll Be Home for Christmas" (performed by Victor Garber)	Walter Kent; Kim Gannon; Buck Ram	Marc Shaiman	4:07
16.	"White Christmas" (performed by Audra McDonald)	Irving Berlin	Tony Moran; Nick De Baise	4:29
Total length:				59:16
