= Scott Foley =

American actor (born 1972)

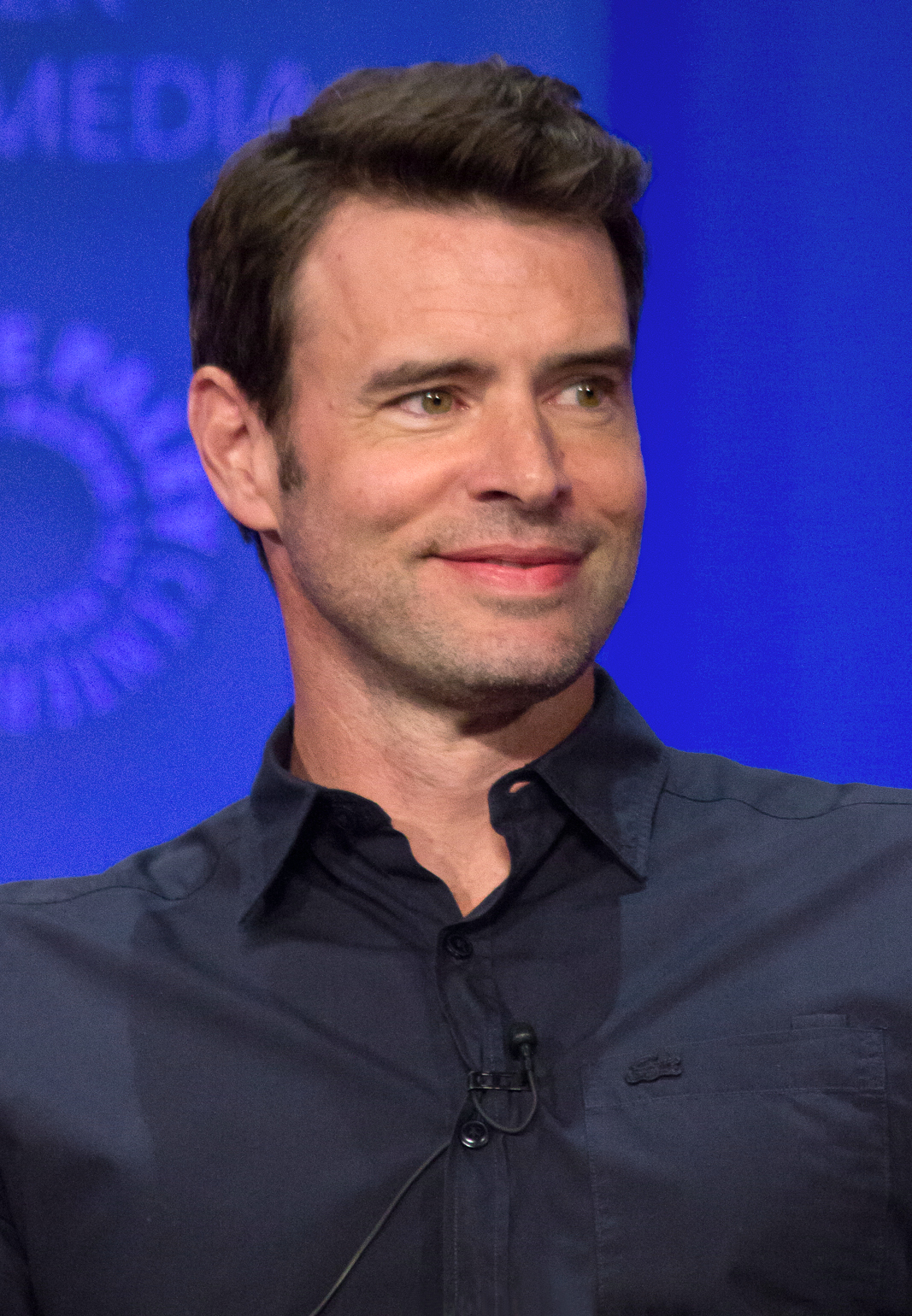
- Foley in 2015
- Born: Scott Kellerman Foley; July 15, 1972 (age 54); Kansas City, Kansas, U.S.
- Occupations: Actor; director; producer
- Years active: 1995–present
- Spouses: Jennifer Garner (m. 2000; div. 2004); Marika Domińczyk (m. 2007)
- Children: 3

Scott Kellerman Foley (born July 15, 1972) is an American actor, director and producer, who is known for roles on shows such as The Unit, Scrubs, Felicity, and Scandal. In film, he's most commonly known as Roman Bridger in the Scream franchise. He has also guest starred on Grey's Anatomy, Dawson's Creek, and House.

== Early life ==
Foley was born on July 15, 1972, in Kansas City, Kansas, the first of three boys for Constance and Hugh Foley. His father was an international banker, and the family lived in Japan and Australia during Foley's childhood. The family settled in St. Louis, Missouri, when Scott was 15 years old. That same year, his mother died from ovarian cancer. Foley attended Ladue High School, before graduating from Clayton High School. His ancestry is Northern European: English, German, Irish and Scottish.

== Career ==
Foley's breakthrough role was playing Noel Crane on Felicity. He had recurring guest appearances on Scrubs as Elliot Reid's boyfriend, Sean Kelly, and on Dawson's Creek as Cliff.

In 2000, Foley appeared as Roman Bridger in Scream 3 (2000), a role that saw him nominated for a Teen Choice Award. Following appearances via archive footage and photographs, Foley returned to the role officially in Scream 7.

Aside from acting, Foley directed one episode of Felicity (called "The Graduate") and three episodes of Scandal. In addition, he had a starring role as Sergeant First Class Bob Brown in the CBS military drama The Unit, during its four-season run, and directed one episode. He guest-starred as a drug-addicted baseball pitcher on House. He also produced the sitcom A.U.S.A., on which he appeared.

Foley appeared in three episodes of ABC's comedy Cougar Town. He signed on to play a businessman being shown houses by the show's resident real estate agent, Jules, played by Courteney Cox, reuniting with her nine years after Scream 3. Foley and Cox's characters began dating, but it ended quickly.

After appearing on Grey's Anatomy, Foley appeared as a guest star on the second season of the hit show Scandal as Captain Jake Ballard. Later that year he was added as a regular to the cast.

Foley portrayed the lead character in ABC's drama Whiskey Cavalier, which ran for one season starting on February 27, 2019, and guest starred in the ABC police drama The Rookie in 2020.

=== Directing ===
Foley made his feature film writing and directing debut in 2013 with Let's Kill Ward's Wife. Foley's wife, Marika Domińczyk, his sister-in-law Dagmara Domińczyk, and brother-in-law Patrick Wilson star in the film, along with Donald Faison, Amy Acker and Nicollette Sheridan.

== Personal life ==
On October 19, 2000, Foley married actress Jennifer Garner, who he met when she guest-starred on Felicity. Foley and Garner separated in March 2003 and Garner filed for divorce in May 2003.

Foley became engaged to Polish-born actress Marika Dominczyk in 2006, and in June 2007, the two wed in a private ceremony in Hawaii. They have three children. Foley's sister-in-law is actress Dagmara Domińczyk, who is married to the actor Patrick Wilson.

In the seventh season's second episode of the genealogy reality program Who Do You Think You Are?, it was revealed that Foley had an ancestor, Samuel Wardwell, who was a defendant in the Salem witch trials. Another ancestor, Simon Wardwell, was a member of then General George Washington's "Life Guard" during the Revolutionary War.

== Filmography ==
Key
†	Denotes films that have not yet been released

=== Film ===
Year	Title	Role	Notes
2000	Scream 3	Roman Bridger	
2001	Stealing Time	Casey Shepard	
2002	Below	Steven Coors	
2011	Still Screaming: The Ultimate Scary Movie Retrospective	Himself	Documentary film
2014	Let's Kill Ward's Wife	Tom Bradford	Also writer, director, and producer
2017	Naked	Cody Favors	
2022	The Storied Life of A.J. Fikry	Daniel Parish	
2025	La Dolce Villa	Eric Field	
2026	Scream 7	Roman Bridger	Cameo
TBA	Slay †	—N/a	Producer only

=== Television ===
Year	Title	Role	Notes
1995	Sweet Valley High	Zack	Episode: "Blunder Alley"
1997	Crowned and Dangerous	Matt	TV film
1997	Step by Step	Jeremy Beck	Episode: "A Star Is Born"
1998	Dawson's Creek	Cliff Elliot	Recurring role (season 1)
1998	Someone to Love Me	Ian Hall	TV film
1998	Forever Love	David	TV film
1998–2002	Felicity	Noel Crane	Main role
1999	Zoe, Duncan, Jack and Jane	Montana Kennedy	2 episodes
2002	Girls Club	Wayne Henry	Episode: "Pilot"
2002–2009; 2026	Scrubs	Sean Kelly	Recurring role (season 3); guest role (seasons 1, 8 and 11)
2003	A.U.S.A.	Adam Sullivan	Main role; 8 episodes
2004	Jack & Bobby	Lars Christopher	Episode: "Election Night"
2005	House	Hank Wiggen	Episode: "Sports Medicine"
2006	Firestorm: Last Stand at Yellowstone	Clay Harding	TV film
2006–2009	The Unit	Bob Brown	Main role
2009	The Last Templar	Sean Daley	Miniseries
2009	Law & Order: Special Victims Unit	Dalton Rindell	Episode: "Hammered"
2009–2010	Cougar Town	Jeff	4 episodes
2010	True Blue	Peter Callahan	TV film
2010	Open Books	Dylan	TV film
2010–2012	Grey's Anatomy	Henry Burton	Recurring role (seasons 7 & 8)
2011	The Doctor	David	TV film
2011–2012	True Blood	Patrick Devins	Main role (season 5); special guest (season 4)
2013	The Goodwin Games	Henry Goodwin	Main role
2013–2018	Scandal	Jake Ballard	Main role
2015–2016	Undateable	Himself	4 episodes
2016	Goldie & Bear	Prince Charming	2 episodes
2017	Insecure	Master Turnfellow	2 episodes
2017	Final Vision	Jeffrey MacDonald	TV film
2019	Whiskey Cavalier	Will Chase	Main role
2021	Ellen's Next Great Designer	Himself	Co-host and judge
2021	The Big Leap	Nick Blackburn	Main role
2024	The Girls on the Bus	Hayden Wells Garrett	Recurring role
2025–2026	Will Trent	Seth McDale	Recurring role (seasons 3 & 4)
2026	It's Not Like That	Malcolm Jeffries	Main role

=== Music videos ===
Year	Title	Artist	Role	Ref.
2014	"Imagine" (UNICEF: World version)	Various	Himself	

== Stage ==
Year	Title	Role	Location
2003	The Violet Hour	Denis McCleary	Biltmore Theatre, Broadway
2005	The Cherry Orchard	Peter Trofimov	Atlantic Theater Company, off-Broadway
2014	The Country House	Michael Astor	Geffen Playhouse, Westwood
2023	The Thanksgiving Play	Jaxton	Hayes Theater, Broadway
