= James Carpinello =

American actor

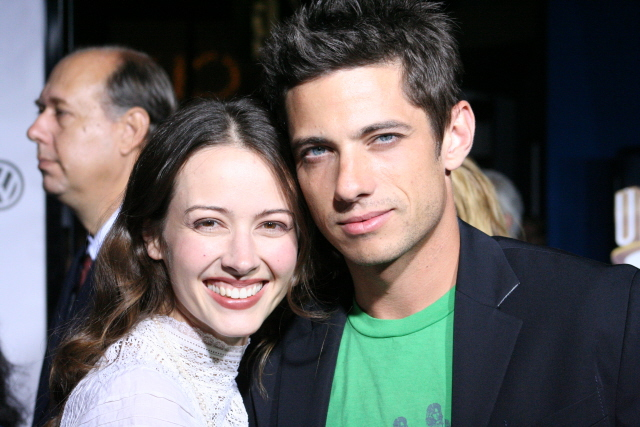
- Carpinello with his wife, Amy Acker, at the premiere of Serenity in 2005
- Born: James Anthony Carpinello; Albany, New York, U.S.
- Years active: 1998–present
- Spouse: Amy Acker (m. 2003)
- Children: 2

James Anthony Carpinello is an American actor. He portrayed Stacee Jaxx in the Broadway production of the musical Rock of Ages.

== Career ==
=== Theater ===
Carpinello first appeared on Broadway in the 1999 musical Saturday Night Fever as Tony Manero.

He was cast as Link Larkin in the Broadway musical version of Hairspray, but left the show for a film role and was replaced by Matthew Morrison.

Carpinello was cast in the leading male role of Sonny in the Broadway musical Xanadu. When Carpinello broke his leg in three places while roller skating during a rehearsal on June 12, 2007, he was forced to leave the production just two weeks before its scheduled June 26, 2007 opening at the Helen Hayes Theatre. Cheyenne Jackson assumed the role of Sonny as of June 22, 2007.

In 2009, Carpinello starred as rocker Stacee Jaxx in the Broadway musical Rock of Ages at the Brooks Atkinson Theatre.

In 2024, Carpinello played Orin Scrivello D.D.S. and other roles in an Off-Broadway production of Little Shop of Horrors.

Carpinello is co-producer of a Broadway musical adaptation of the 1987 vampire film The Lost Boys. The musical is scheduled to open in the spring of 2026 at the Palace Theatre.

=== Film ===
Carpinello has acted in films such as The Punisher (2004), The Great Raid (2005), Let's Kill Ward's Wife (2014), and Midway (2019 film) (2019).

During the COVID-19 pandemic, Carpinello and his wife, Amy Acker, created, filmed, produced, and starred in a 14-minute-long short film entitled Outside (2020). A thriller, Outside was filmed using Carpinello's son's iPhone.

=== Television ===
Carpinello has appeared on episodes of the CBS series The Good Wife as Detective Anthony Burton. He guest starred on the season 4 premiere of the USA Network series In Plain Sight. He played former soldier Joey in "Mission Creep", the third episode of CBS crime drama series Person of Interest, and reprised that role as the series neared the end of its run in June 2016. He was a regular on the short-lived Fox medical/crime drama The Mob Doctor.

Carpinello has played recurring roles in The Blacklist and Gotham.

== Personal life ==
He is the son of Anthony J. Carpinello, a former Justice of the New York Supreme Court, Appellate Division, and Sharon E. Kelly, a mental health official. On April 25, 2003, Carpinello married actress Amy Acker. The couple had a son in 2005 and a daughter in 2006.

== Credits ==
=== Stage ===
Year	Title	Role	Notes
1998	Stupid Kids	Jim Stark	
1999–2000	Saturday Night Fever	Tony Manero	
2007	Xanadu	Sonny	
2009	Rock of Ages	Stacee Jaxx	
2024–2025	Little Shop of Horrors	Orin Scrivello	

=== Film ===
Year	Title	Role	Notes
2004	The Punisher	Bobby Saint and John Saint	
2005	The Great Raid	Cpl. Aliteri	
2012	Christmas Is Ruined	Agent Spaulding	Short film
2013	Gangster Squad	Johnny Stompanato	
2014	Let's Kill Ward's Wife	Ronnie	
2017	The Dunning Man	Connor Ryan	
2019	Midway	Captain William H. Brockman Jr.	
2023	Fear the Night	Bart	

=== Television ===
Year	Title	Role	Notes
2000	Felicity	Randy	3 episodes
2006	So Notorious	Pete	9 episodes
2006	The Closer	Larry Cole	2 episodes
2010	The Good Wife	Detective Anthony Burton	5 episodes
2010	CSI: Miami	Dominic Giordano	Episode: "See No Evil"
2011	Law & Order: Special Victims Unit	Joe Gilbert	Episode: "Pop"
2011	NCIS	Smitty Brown	Episode: "False Witness"
2011	In Plain Sight	Riley	Episode: "The Art of the Steal"
2011, 2016	Person of Interest	Joey Durban	2 episodes
2012	Body of Proof	Sal Rubenstone	Episode: "Occupational Hazards"
2012–2013	The Mob Doctor	Franco Leoni	12 episodes
2013	Castle	Frank Henson	Episode: "Like Father, Like Daughter"
2014	Blue Bloods	Russell Price	Episode: "Loose Lips"
2016–2017	Gotham	Mario Falcone	8 episodes
2017–2018	The Blacklist	Henry Prescott	4 episodes
2019	The Gifted	Max	3 episodes
2019	The Enemy Within	Anthony Cabrera	6 episodes
2019	What Just Happened??! with Fred Savage	Glenn	Episode: "Elevator"
2022	Law & Order: Special Victims Unit	Paul Greco	Episode: "Breakwater"
