= National Lampoon's Bag Boy =

Bag Boy
- DVD Cover
- Directed by: Mort Nathan
- Screenplay by: Hans Rodionoff; Mort Nathan
- Story by: Hans Rodionoff
- Starring: Dennis Farina; Paul Campbell; Marika Dominczyk; Larry Miller; Robert Hoffman
- Cinematography: Hubert Taczanowski
- Music by: Andrew Gross
- Distributed by: Virgil Films
- Release date: September 14, 2007 (USA)
- Running time: 94 min.
- Country: United States
- Language: English

National Lampoon's Bag Boy is a 2007 American comedy film directed by Mort Nathan, starring Dennis Farina, Paul Campbell and Marika Dominczyk.

Produced by National Lampoon, Inc., it was the company's "first in-house production since 1989's National Lampoon's Christmas Vacation".

== Plot ==
A teenager enters the world of competitive grocery store bagging.

== Cast ==
- Dennis Farina as Marty Engstrom
- Paul Campbell as Phil Piedmonstein
- Marika Domińczyk as Bambi Strasinsky
- Josh Dean as Freddy
- Robert Hoffman as Clyde 'Windmill' Wynorski
- Nick Lashaway as Ace
- Wesley Jonathan as Alonzo Ford
- Bruce Altman as Norman
- Lisa Darr as Laurie
- Larry Miller as Pike
- Richard Kind as Dave Weiner
- Rob Moran as Ralph Riley
- Jeanette Puhich as Beehive Hair Woman
- Erin Hiatt as Scantily Clad Girl
- Carlos Lacamara as Julio
- Carly Craig as The girl in the museum
- Michael O'Connell as Cart Wrangler
- Brooke Shields as Mrs. Hart
