= Let's Kill Ward's Wife =

- Theatrical release poster
- Directed by: Scott Foley
- Written by: Scott Foley
- Produced by: James Carpinello; Scott Foley; Joe Hardesty; Patrick Wilson
- Starring: Patrick Wilson; Scott Foley; Donald Faison; James Carpinello; Amy Acker; Dagmara Domińczyk; Marika Domińczyk; Greg Grunberg; Nicollette Sheridan
- Cinematography: Eduardo Barraza
- Edited by: Rebecca Weigold Stocker
- Music by: John Spiker
- Production companies: Lost Rhino Films; The Magone Productions
- Distributed by: Tribeca Film; Well Go USA Entertainment
- Release date: December 23, 2014 (United States)
- Running time: 81 minutes
- Country: United States
- Language: English
- Budget: $5 million

Let's Kill Ward's Wife is a 2014 American black comedy film written and directed by Scott Foley in his directorial debut. The film stars Patrick Wilson, Foley, Donald Faison, and James Carpinello, and features Amy Acker, Dagmara Domińczyk, Marika Domińczyk, Greg Grunberg, and Nicollette Sheridan in supporting roles. Foley, Wilson, and Carpinello produced the film, along with Joe Hardesty. The film follows three friends (Wilson, Foley, and Carpinello) who plan to kill their friend Ward's (Faison) abusive wife, Stacy (Dagmara Domińczyk).

The cast consists almost entirely of actors who are related to one another, with many being siblings or spouses. For example, Wilson is married to Dagmara Domińczyk, who portrays the wife of Faison's character, and Carpinello is married to Acker, who portrays the wife of Foley's character.

The film was released on video on demand on December 23, 2014, prior to its limited release on January 9, 2015. It received generally negative reviews from critics, with criticism aimed at its humor and slow pace.

== Plot ==
Ward's wife Stacy is very domineering towards him, much to the chagrin of his friends David and his ex-wife Amanda, Tom and his wife Gina, and their single friend Ronnie.

One day at a birthday party, Stacy suggests that she and Tom have an affair with one another. Tom gets irritated and shoves Stacy's face into the cake and as she protests she slips on icing and falls, knocking herself out. When he sees her starting to come to, Tom panics and strangles her to death.

The friends and their wives work on bleeding out and dismembering Stacy and burying her body parts in different places while avoiding their nosy neighbor.

After Ward reports his wife missing, all of the friends move on with their lives without Stacy's presence.

== Cast ==
- Patrick Wilson as David, an actor going through a divorce. He has a young child.
- Scott Foley as Tom Bradford, a married man who works with Ward as a reporter. He also has an infant child.
- Donald Faison as Ward
- James Carpinello as Ronnie, an unmarried womanizer
- Amy Acker as Gina Bradford, Tom's wife
- Dagmara Domińczyk as Stacy, Ward's abusive wife
- Marika Domińczyk as Amanda, David's ex-wife
- Greg Grunberg as Bruce, a police officer
- Nicollette Sheridan as Robin Peters

== Production ==
I found the older I get—and it may be this way for women as well, but it's true for men especially—it's hard to make new friends when you get to a certain age, you know? You have responsibilities between work and family, and you want to dedicate the time you do have to your kids. So losing friends at any age is very difficult but losing friends when you're not making any new ones is even more difficult, and I wanted to look at that as well.

— Writer and director Scott Foley on the inspiration of the film

Originally titled Ward's Wife, Let's Kill Ward's Wife was the first film directed by actor Scott Foley, though he had previously directed episodes of television series. Foley wrote the script in the early 2010s after having his first child. Realizing he was not keeping in close contact with some of his long-time friends, Foley concluded that spouses were the primary reason for friends growing apart in adulthood. He originally planned for the script to be "very heartwarming", but later conceived the idea to have several friends plan to kill one of their wives.

After finishing the script, Foley sent it to James Carpinello and Patrick Wilson, his brother-in-law. Both agreed to appear in the film. Foley, who portrays Tom, had not originally intended to star in the film. However, the crew was unable to find someone they believed fit the part better than Foley, and he decided to play the part. The film's cast features a variety of Foley's close friends and family. His wife, Marika Domińczyk, plays Amanda, the wife of Wilson's character, while Wilson's wife Dagmara Domińczyk portrays Stacy, the wife of Donald Faison's character Ward. Additionally, Amy Acker, Carpinello's wife, played Geena, the wife of Foley's character. Foley and Acker's characters have a sex scene in the film, and Carpinello helped to direct those scenes.

Principal photography took place over 12 days. Due to the film's small budget, the crew was limited to "a camera and a tripod", with no access to camera dollies or cranes. As a result, the camera remains static throughout the film, causing Foley and cinematographer Eduardo Barraza to include enough movement in the shots to keep viewers from "getting bored". In order to keep the budget down, the actors were paid the Screen Actors Guild minimum of $100 a day, although several cast members invested their pay back into the film.

== Release ==
In September 2014, Tribeca Film and Well Go USA Entertainment acquired the rights to distribute the film in North American theaters. The film was released to video on demand platforms and iTunes on December 23, 2014, and in a limited release on January 9, 2015. The film was released on Blu-ray Disc and DVD on March 3, 2015. As of February 19, 2016, it has earned $31,371 in home media sales.

=== Critical response ===
Let's Kill Ward's Wife received generally negative reviews. Review aggregator website Rotten Tomatoes reported a 17% approval rating, with an average score of 3.5/10 based on six reviews. On Metacritic, which assigns a normalized rating out of 100 based on reviews from four critics, the film has a score of 21/100, which is considered to be "generally unfavorable" reviews.

Justin Chang of Variety gave the film a negative review, opining that it is "torturously unfunny" and criticized Foley's writing and direction, stating that "Foley hasn't a clue how to make these bougie ciphers interesting, much less how to extract anything funny, tense, shocking, relatable or observant from his banal scenario." Chris Packham of The Village Voice agreed, criticizing the film for being "as vacuous and undeserving of regard as any of its characters". Chuck Bowen of Slant Magazine praised Foley's direction, but stated that "[a]ny pretense of satire collapses by the film's midpoint, however, leaving only the contempt". He further criticized the film's female characters. In a more positive review, Gary Goldstein of the Los Angeles Times praised Wilson's performance, as well as the film's "casual charms and deft timing of its appealing cast". However, he similarly criticized the film's second half, stating that "the film's pacing and narrative structure take a hit — and never quite recover".
