= The Violet Hour =

Play written by Richard Greenberg

The Violet Hour is a play by Richard Greenberg which premiered at the South Coast Repertory in 2002 and ran on Broadway in 2003.

== Synopsis ==
The play takes place in New York in 1919. A young publisher named John Pace Seavering has enough money to publish one book. He is torn between two options - publishing the gargantuan novel of his former college roommate, Denis McCleary, who hopes that he and his fiancée, Rosamund Plinth, can win the blessing of her wealthy father - or publishing the memoirs of his lover Jessie Brewster, a famous singer. Then, a mysterious machine appears in the office, spewing paper. John and his assistant Gidger discover that the papers are from books published far in the future, chronicling the history of the publishing house after it achieves success and prestige. Gidger, John's assistant, learns that he is forgotten by time (while even his dog merits a mention). John learns that while he becomes a well-to-do publisher, the success has disastrous results for both Denis and Jessie. He tries to avert these fates by refusing to publish either manuscript, but realizes that their paths are unavoidable. Finally, he agrees to publish both, knowing that what happens afterwards is out of his hands.

=== Cast of characters ===
- John Pace Seavering - publisher
- Jessie Brewster - John's lover
- Denis McCleary - college roommate, friend and author
- Rosamund Plinth - Denis' new girlfriend
- Gidger - John's assistant

== Production history ==
The Violet Hour was commissioned by and originally produced by South Coast Repertory, in Costa Mesa, California, and premiered there from November 5 through 24, 2002. Directed by Evan Yionoulis, the cast featured Hamish Linklater as Seavering, Mario Cantone as Gidger, Michelle Hurd as Jessie, Kate Arrington as Rosamund, and Curtis Mark Williams as Denis.

The play debuted on Broadway on November 6, 2003. This was the first play produced by the Manhattan Theatre Club (MTC) in the renovated Biltmore Theatre. MTC's production cast featured Robert Sean Leonard as Seavering, Scott Foley as Denis, Robin Miles as Jessie, Dagmara Dominczyk as Rosamund, and Cantone reprising his role as Gidger, and ran for 54 performances, the planned length of its subscription run. Evan Yionoulis again directed. The production was nominated for the 2004 Drama Desk Award, Outstanding Lighting Design (Donald Holder) but experienced trouble during production: Laura Benanti withdrew during rehearsals, and Jasmine Guy left after the first week of previews.

=== Regional productions ===
- ReAct Theatre (Seattle) - July 14 through August 7, 2005, following an August 2004 reading, with three of the same actors.
- Theater Tribe (Los Angeles) - March 23 through April 19, 2008
- Seattle Public Theater (Seattle) - January 29 through February 21, 2010
- University Theatre (University of Chicago) - Opening: December, 2011 (1 preview, 3 performances)
- Coca Black Box Theater (St. Louis) - Opening: August 23, 2012 (10 performances)

=== Musical theatre adaptation ===
A Studio Cast recording of a musical adaptation of the play was released by Will Reynolds (composer) and Eric Price (lyricist/bookwriter) on November 4, 2022. The recording stars are Santino Fontana (John), Erika Henningsen (Rosamund), Jeremy Jordan (Denis), Solea Pfeiffer (Jessie), and Brandon Uranowitz (Gidger). The recording was named the Best Cast Recording of the Year by the Broadway Radio Show and material from the show has won the authors the Fred Ebb Award for Musical Theatre Writing and the Kleban Prize for Lyrics. Orchestrations are by Charlie Rosen and musical supervision is by Andy Einhorn. Richard Greenberg wrote the Introduction to the recording's digital booklet. The world premiere production of the musical is in development.
