= Marika Domińczyk =

Polish actress (born 1980)

- Born: 7 July 1980 (age 46)
- Occupation: Actress
- Years active: 2000–present
- Spouse: Scott Foley (m. 2007)
- Children: 3
- Relatives: Dagmara Domińczyk (sister); Patrick Wilson (brother-in-law)

Marika Domińczyk (/doʊˈmiːntʃɪk/ doh-MEEN-chick; born 7 July 1980) is a Polish actress who is best known for her role as Dr. Eliza Minnick on Grey's Anatomy, season 13.

== Personal life ==
Marika Domińczyk is one of three daughters born to Aleksandra and Mirosław Domińczyk. She immigrated to the United States as a child. Her father was one of the leaders in the Polish Solidarity movement. She is the younger sister of actress Dagmara Dominczyk.

Domińczyk became engaged to actor Scott Foley in 2006. In June 2007, the two wed in a private ceremony in Hawaii. They have three children: daughter Malina (b. October 2009) and sons Keller (b. April 2012) and Konrad (b. November 13, 2014).

== Career ==
In 2004, Domińczyk appeared in the short-lived television series The Help. The following year, she appeared as Bernadette in the 2005 film The 40-Year-Old Virgin. From 2006–2007, she guest-starred on the ABC's Brothers & Sisters as Tyler Altamirano. She reprised her role in the last two episodes of the show's fifth season. Despite her being of Polish extraction, her looks have often led to her being cast in Hispanic roles, such as Anna in The Help and, most recently, as South American agent Isabella in Get Smart's Bruce and Lloyd: Out of Control. She appeared in Who Do You Love?, the Las Vegas episode "3 Babes, 100 Guns, and a Fat Chick" (2008) as a bounty hunter, and Danny's Marine Sergeant in Iraq, and as a Russian informant to Cool Breeze, played by her husband Scott Foley, in The Unit. She also starred in National Lampoon's Bag Boy.

Domińczyk played the role of Lara in the film I Hope They Serve Beer in Hell. She was signed for the recurring role, in ABC's drama series Grey's Anatomy of Dr. Eliza Minnick, an orthopedic surgeon and residency-instruction consultant who became a love interest for Jessica Capshaw's character of Dr. Arizona Robbins, which role she originated as the program's thirteenth season began. Ultimately, Dr. Minnick's approach to surgical-residency programs led to her being fired from the hospital, and Domińczyk was, herself, released from the cast. In 2019, Domińczyk recurred as Tina Marek on ABC's Whiskey Cavalier, which starred her real-life husband Scott Foley.

== Filmography ==
=== Film ===
| Year | Title | Role | Notes |
|---|---|---|---|
| 2001 | 3 A.M. | Cathy | |
| 2004 | Invitation to a Suicide | Manhattan Woman | |
| 2005 | The 40-Year-Old Virgin | Bernadette | |
| 2007 | National Lampoon's Bag Boy | Bambi Strasinsky | Direct to video |
| 2008 | Get Smart's Bruce and Lloyd: Out of Control | Isabella | Direct to video |
| 2008 | Who Do You Love | Revetta Chess | |
| 2009 | I Hope They Serve Beer in Hell | Lara | |
| 2014 | Let's Kill Ward's Wife | Amanda | |
| 2026 | Not My Dog | Mrs. Athelia | |

=== Television ===
| Year | Title | Role | Notes |
|---|---|---|---|
| 2000 | The Street | Hostess | Episode: "Closet Cases" |
| 2001 | Law & Order: Special Victims Unit | Tess Michner | Episode: "Consent" |
| 2002 | Witchblade | Christina | 2 episodes |
| 2002 | Porn n Chicken | Tatiana | Television film |
| 2004 | The Help | Anna, the Nanny | 7 episodes |
| 2004 | North Shore | Erika | 6 episodes |
| 2005 | Confessions of a Dog | Brunette | Television film |
| 2005 | Halley's Comet | Mattea | Television film |
| 2006 | Bones | Leslie Snow | Episode: "The Woman at the Airport" |
| 2006 | Heist | Lola | 6 episodes |
| 2006–11 | Brothers & Sisters | Tyler Altamirano | 10 episodes |
| 2008 | Las Vegas | Marisa Rodriguez | Episode: "3 Babes, 100 Guns and a Fat Chick" |
| 2008 | House | Heather | Episode: "Adverse Events" |
| 2009 | The Unit | Anya | Episode: "Endgame" |
| 2011 | Rizzoli & Isles | Theresa | Episode: "Bloodlines" |
| 2013 | Vegas | Nadia Lattimer | Episode: "Two of a Kind" |
| 2013 | Criminal Minds | Lida Taffert | Episode: "The Caller" |
| 2016–17 | Grey's Anatomy | Dr. Eliza Minnick | season 13, 11 episodes |
| 2019 | Whiskey Cavalier | Martyna ‘Tina’ Marek | Recurring, 6 episodes |
| 2020 | Hawaii Five-0 | Lorena Massey | Episode: "Man Is a Slave of Love" |
| 2022 | Inventing Anna | Talia Mallay | Miniseries |
| 2022 | Barry | Ana | 2 episodes |
