= Dagmara Domińczyk =

Polish actress (born 1976)

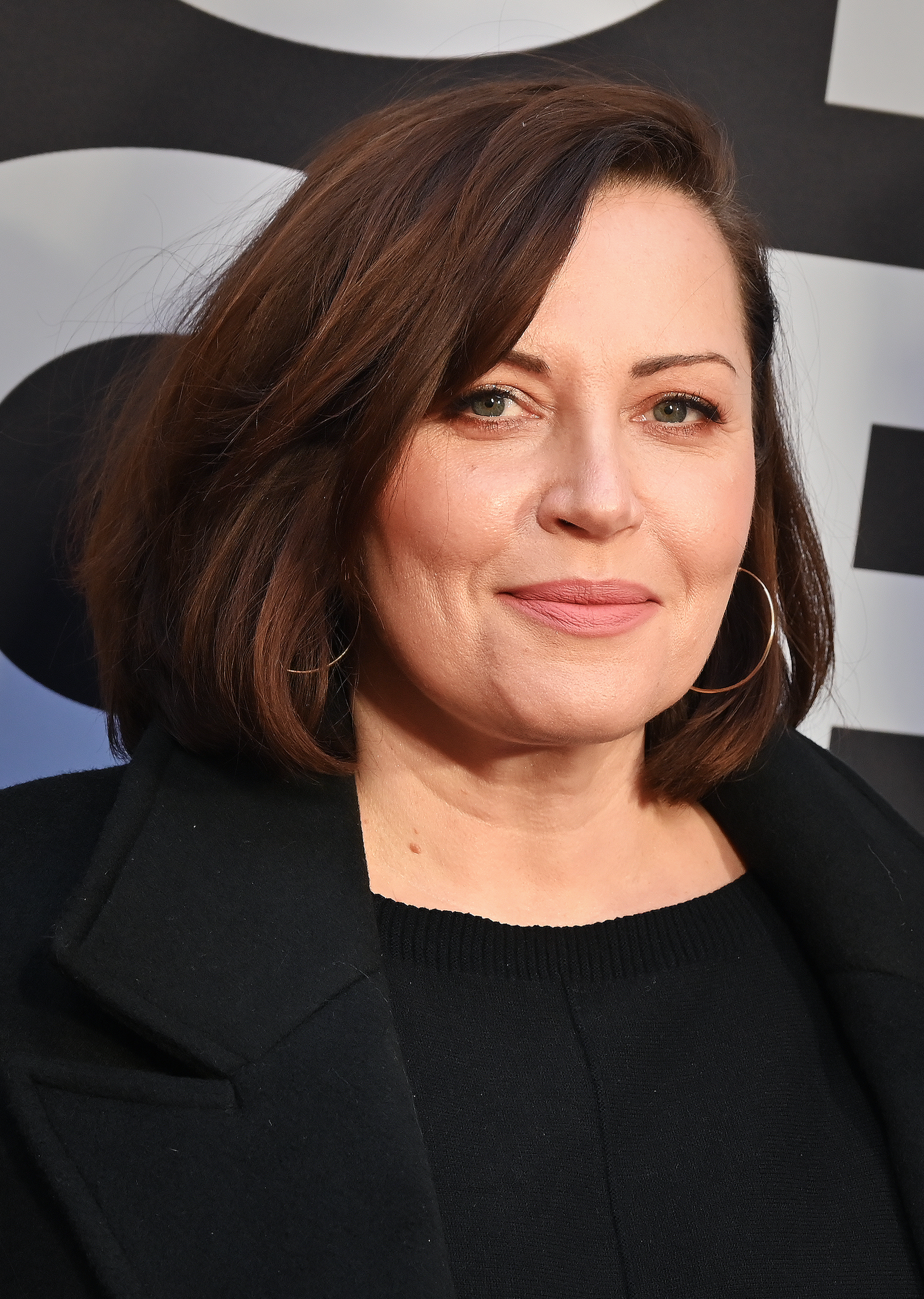
- Domińczyk in 2025
- Born: 17 July 1976 (age 50); Kielce, Poland
- Education: Carnegie Mellon University (BFA)
- Occupations: Actress; author
- Years active: 1999–present
- Spouse: Patrick Wilson (m. 2005)
- Children: 2
- Relatives: Marika Domińczyk (sister)

Dagmara Domińczyk (/doʊˈmiːntʃɪk/ doh-MEEN-chick, Polish: [daɡˈmara dɔˈmij̃t͡ʂɨk]; born 17 July 1976) is a Polish actress. She has appeared in the films Rock Star (2001), The Count of Monte Cristo (2002), Kinsey (2004), Trust the Man (2005), Lonely Hearts (2006), Running with Scissors (2006), Higher Ground (2011), The Letter (2012), The Immigrant (2013), Big Stone Gap (2014), A Woman, a Part (2016), The Assistant (2019), The Lost Daughter (2021), Bottoms (2023), and Priscilla (2023). Domińczyk also had a main role in the HBO comedy-drama television series Succession (2018–2023).

In 2013, she released her novel The Lullaby of Polish Girls.

== Early life and education ==
Domińczyk was born in Kielce, to Aleksandra and Mirosław Domińczyk, a member of the Polish Solidarity movement. She moved with her family to New York City in 1983 as asylum seekers due to her parents' political associations (her father's involvement with Amnesty International and the Solidarity movement). She is the older sister of actresses Marika Domińczyk and Veronika Domińczyk.

Domińczyk was educated at Fiorello H. LaGuardia High School in Manhattan. She went on to study at Carnegie Mellon University's School of Drama in Pittsburgh, from which she graduated in 1998.

== Career ==
In 1999, Domińczyk made her acting debut on Broadway as Anna Friel's understudy in Patrick Marber's production of Closer. The following year, she made her feature film debut as Claire in the Stuart Blumberg-penned romantic comedy Keeping the Faith. In 2001, she played Tania Asher in Rock Star, and in 2002, portrayed Edmond Dantès' fiancée, Mercédès Mondego (née Herrera), in the screen adaptation of The Count of Monte Cristo.

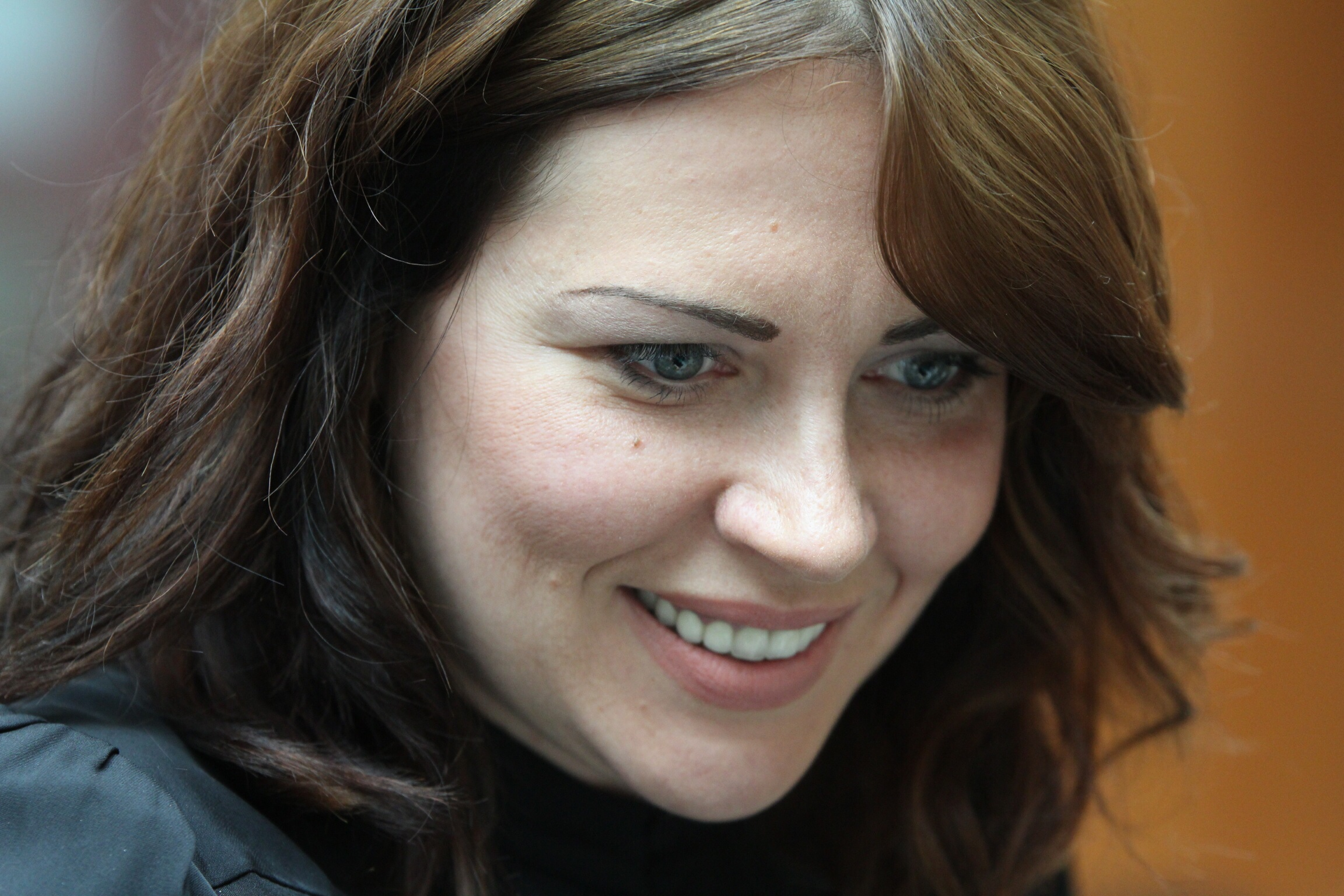
Domińczyk at the Montclair Film Festival in May 2014

In 2003, she returned to Broadway playing Caroline Bramble in a production of Enchanted April. Domińczyk had guest starring roles in television series such as Kinsey (2004), 24 (2005), The Bedford Diaries (2006), The Good Wife (2011), Suits (2011), Person of Interest (2012), and Boardwalk Empire (2014). In 2006, she appeared in the Todd Robinson–directed Lonely Hearts and the black comedy film Running with Scissors.

In 2011, Domińczyk co-starred in Vera Farmiga's directorial debut drama film Higher Ground as a religious group member who develops a brain tumor. The following year, she appeared in the psychological thriller film The Letter. She next appeared in James Gray's drama film The Immigrant (2013).

In 2013, she published her first novel, The Lullaby of Polish Girls, which was loosely based on her youth in her native Poland.

In 2014, Domińczyk starred in the Polish political thriller film Jack Strong, directed by Władysław Pasikowski, and the black comedy film Let's Kill Ward's Wife, directed by her brother-in-law Scott Foley.

Between 2018–2023, she played Karolina Novotney in HBO's popular comedy-drama television series Succession.

In 2021, she starred in Maggie Gyllenhaal's psychological drama The Lost Daughter with Olivia Colman and Dakota Johnson.

In 2023, Domińczyk was cast as Ann Beaulieu, Priscilla Presley's mother, in Sofia Coppola's biographical drama film Priscilla. In the same year, she also appeared in the satirical teen comedy film Bottoms directed by Emma Seligman.

== Personal life ==
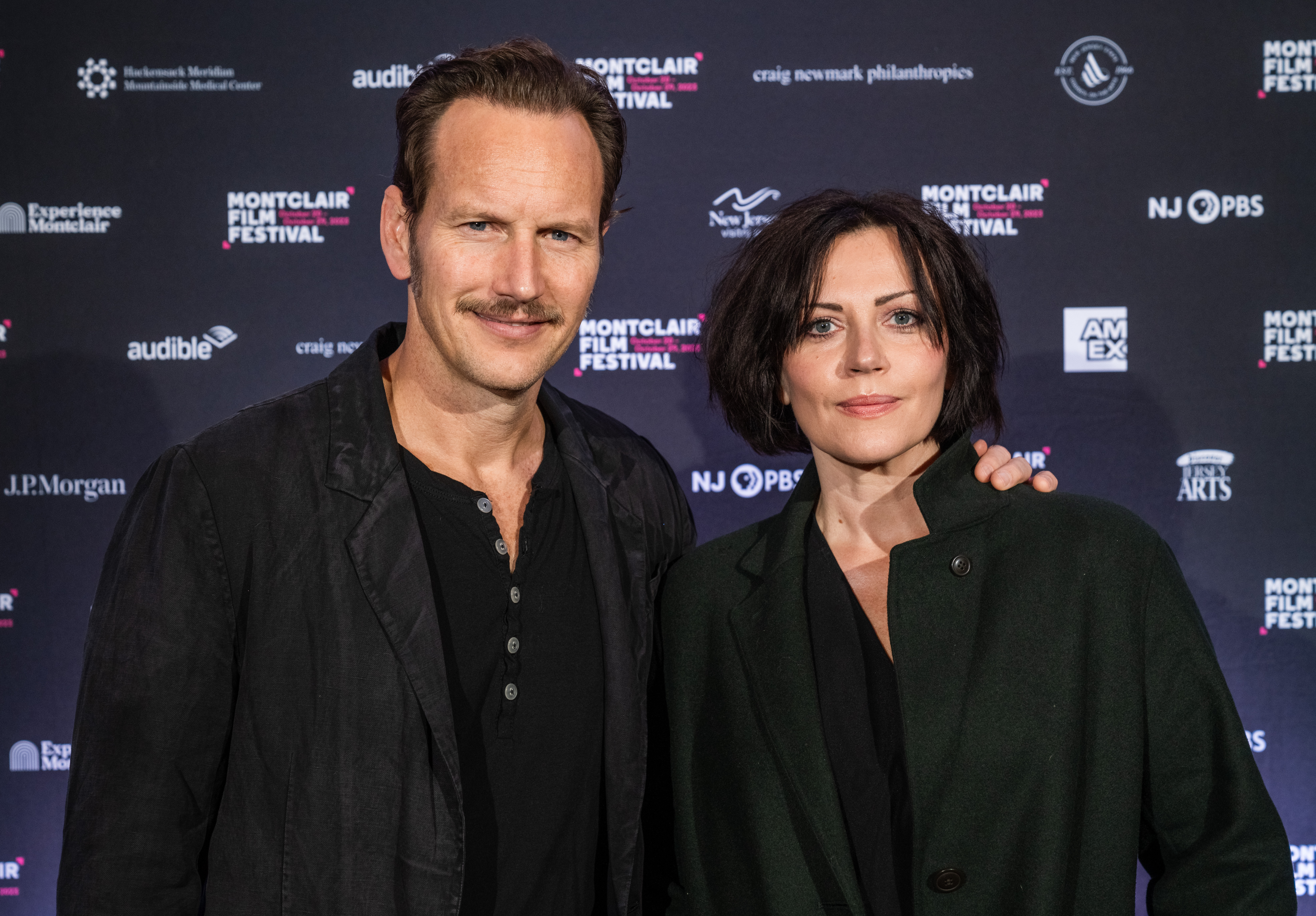
Domińczyk with her husband Patrick Wilson (2023)

In June 2005, Domińczyk married actor and fellow Carnegie Mellon alumnus Patrick Wilson. They have appeared together in the films Running with Scissors (2006), Jack Strong (2014), Big Stone Gap (2014), and Let's Kill Ward's Wife (2014). On 23 June 2006, she gave birth to their first son. Domińczyk gave birth to their second son on 9 August 2009. The family resides in Montclair, New Jersey. She is a sister-in-law of actor Scott Foley, who is married to her sister Marika.

== Filmography ==
=== Film ===
Year	Title	Role	Notes
2000	Keeping the Faith	Claire	
2001	Rock Star	Tania Asher	
2002	The Count of Monte Cristo	Mercedès Herrera	
2002	They	Terry Alba	
2003	Tough Luck	Divana / Melissa	
2004	Kinsey	Agnes Gebhard	
2005	Trust the Man	Pamela	
2006	Mentor	Julia Wilder	
2006	Lonely Hearts	Delphine Downing	
2006	Running with Scissors	Suzanne	
2007	Prisoner	Olivia	
2010	Helena from the Wedding	Eve	
2011	Higher Ground	Annika	
2011	Felix the Painter	Brigitte	Short film
2012	The Letter	Elizabeth McIntyre	
2013	Phantom	Sophi Zubov	
2013	The Immigrant	Belva	
2014	Jack Strong	Sue	
2014	Big Stone Gap	Elizabeth Taylor	
2014	Let's Kill Ward's Wife	Stacy	
2016	A Woman, a Part	Nadia Jones	
2020	Abe	Rebecca	
2020	The Assistant	Ellen	
2021	The Lost Daughter	Callie	
2022	My Love Affair with Marriage	Zelma (voice)	
2023	Bottoms	Mrs. Callahan	
2023	Priscilla	Ann Beaulieu	
2024	Miller's Girl	Beatrice	
2024	Travel Essentials	Ada Rosińska	
2026	Tony	Gladys Sacksman Bourdain	
TBA	Tonight at Noon	Sally	Post-production

=== Television ===
Year	Title	Role	Notes
2001	Third Watch	Jeneca Farabee	2 episodes
2003	Law & Order: Special Victims Unit	Kate Logan	Episode: "Pandora"
2004	Bad Apple	Gina Defresco	Television film
2004	The Five People You Meet in Heaven	Marguerite	Television film
2005	24	Nicole	2 episodes
2006	The Bedford Diaries	Katrina Macklin	4 episodes
2011	The Good Wife	Isabel Sharp	Episode: "Foreign Affairs"
2011	Suits	Nancy	Episode: "Pilots"
2012	Person of Interest	Sarah Jennings	Episode: "Many Happy Returns"
2014	Boardwalk Empire	Dinah Linehan	Episode: "Devil You Know"
2018–2023	Succession	Karolina Novotney	Recurring season 1, main seasons 2-4
2018	The Deuce	Genevieve Furie	Episode: "There's an Art to This"
2020	Prodigal Son	The Nightingale	Episode: "The Professionals"
2022	We Own This City	Erika Jensen	6 episodes
2023	Hello Tomorrow!	Elle	Recurring role
2024	American Horror Stories	Anka Kieslowski	Episode: "Clone"
2025	Black Rabbit	Val	6 episodes
2026	The Savant	Danielle Horowitz	3 episodes

=== Voiceovers and audio narration ===
- Someone to Love by Jude Devereaux
- Day After Night by Anita Diamant
- Every Note Played by Lisa Genova
- The Other Queen by Phillipa Gregory
- The Boleyn Inheritance by Phillipa Gregory
- Show No Fear by Perri O'Shaughnessy
- In Secret Service by Mitch Silver

== Stage ==
Year	Title	Role	Location	Notes
1999	Closer	Alice Ayres	Music Box Theatre, Broadway	Understudy
2003	Enchanted April	Caroline Bramble	Belasco Theatre, Broadway	
2003	The Violet Hour	Rosamund Plinth	Biltmore Theatre, Broadway	
2012–2013	Golden Boy	Anna Bonaparte	Belasco Theatre, Broadway	

== Awards and nominations ==
Year	Association	Category	Project	Result	Ref.
2022	Screen Actors Guild Awards	Outstanding Performance by an Ensemble in a Drama Series	Succession	Won	
2024	Screen Actors Guild Awards	Outstanding Performance by an Ensemble in a Drama Series	Succession	Won	
